= Gjennestad =

Village in Arendal Municipality, Norway

Gjennestad Ginnestad
- Village
- Interactive map of Gjennestad
- Coordinates: 58.4246°N 08.6628°E
- Country: Norway
- Region: Southern Norway
- County: Agder
- District: Østre Agder
- Municipality: Arendal Municipality
- Elevation: 56 m (184 ft)
- Time zone: UTC+01:00 (CET)
  - Summer (DST): UTC+02:00 (CEST)
- Post Code: 4821 Rykene

Gjennestad is a village in Arendal Municipality in Agder county, Norway. The village is located a short distance north of the river Nidelva, just off Norwegian County Road 407. The village of Rykene sits about 3 kilometres (1.9 mi) to the southwest of Gjennestad.
