= Norwegian County Road 407 =

Road in Agder county, Norway

Coordinates: 58.4381°N 08.7132°E

County Road 407
- Bokmål: Fylkesvei 407; Nynorsk: Fylkesveg 407

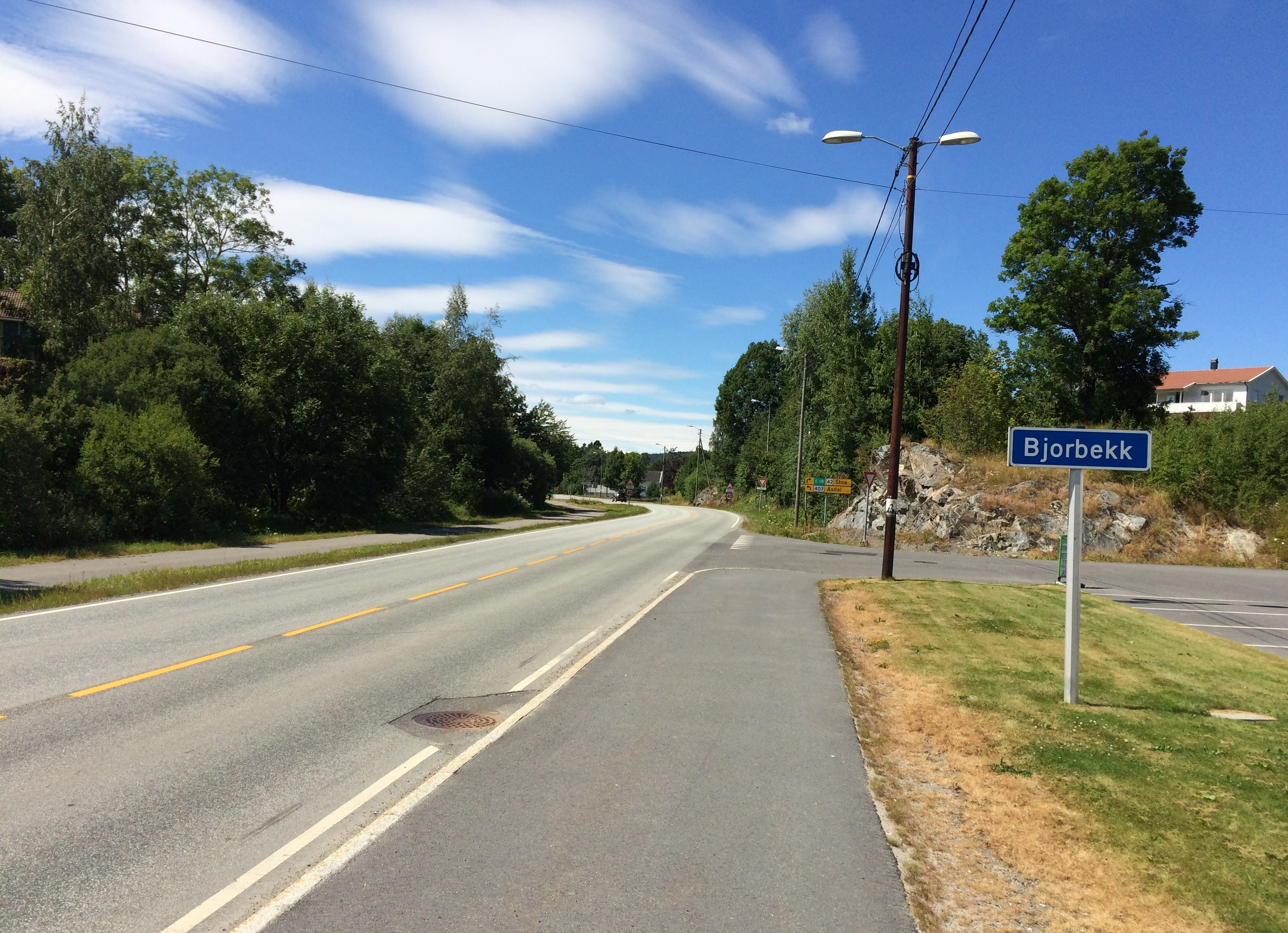
- View of the road at Bjorbekk in Arendal

Route information
- Maintained by Norwegian Public Roads Administration
- Length: 13.9 km (8.6 mi)

Major junctions
- North end: Sponvika, Arendal Municipality
- South end: Vik, Grimstad Municipality

Location
- Country: Norway

Highway system
- Roads in Norway; National Roads; County Roads
← Fv406	→ Fv408

Norwegian county road 407 (Fylkesvei 407) is a Norwegian county road in Agder county, Norway. The 13.9-kilometre (8.6 mi) highway runs between the village of Vik in Grimstad Municipality and Sponvika on the south side of the city of Arendal in Arendal Municipality. Prior to the transportation reforms of 2010, this road was a Norwegian national road, but since then it was taken over by the county.

== Description ==
=== Grimstad Municipality ===
Southern terminus at Fv420 at Vik
E18 at Bringsværmoen
Fv53 from Temse to Lunde
Fv52 to Fv53 Lia and Steinsmoen
Fv53 at Lunde
Fv34 from Lunde to Fv420 at Bie
Strubru bridge over the river Nidelva

=== Arendal Municipality ===
Rykeneveien

Fv408 Jernbaneveien from Rykene to Fv42 at Blakstad in Froland Municipality
Fv173 Presteveien at Øyestad Church to Fv172 at Løddesøl
Fv182 Gjennestadveien from Helle to Klidningsklev
E18 to Rannekleiv or Sandstø
Fv178 from Asdal to Fv420 at Natvig
Fv171 Sørsvennveien from Bjorbekk to Fv42 at Stoa
Fv183 from Sponvika to Vestre Strømsbu
Northern terminus at Fv420 Vesterveien
