= Rise, Agder =

Village in Arendal Municipality, Norway

Rise
- Village
- Interactive map of Rise
- Coordinates: 58.46667°N 8.63333°E
- Country: Norway
- Region: Southern Norway
- County: Agder
- District: Østre Agder
- Municipality: Arendal Municipality
- Elevation: 58 m (190 ft)
- Time zone: UTC+01:00 (CET)
  - Summer (DST): UTC+02:00 (CEST)
- Post Code: 4821 Rykene

Rise is a village in Arendal Municipality in Agder county, Norway. The village is located on the eastern short of the river Nidelva, along the Arendalsbanen railway line. The Norwegian County Road 408 runs through the village. The village of Libru lies about 3 kilometres (1.9 mi) to the northeast and the village of Løddesøl lies about 2.5 kilometres (1.6 mi) to the south.
