= Løddesøl =

Village in Arendal Municipality, Norway

- Village
- Interactive map of Løddesøl
- Coordinates: 58.4421°N 08.6233°E
- Country: Norway
- Region: Southern Norway
- County: Agder
- District: Østre Agder
- Municipality: Arendal Municipality
- Elevation: 65 m (213 ft)
- Time zone: UTC+01:00 (CET)
  - Summer (DST): UTC+02:00 (CEST)
- Post Code: 4821 Rykene

Løddesøl is a village in Arendal Municipality in Agder county, Norway. The village is located along the Norwegian County Road 408 on the eastern shore of the river Nidelva. The village lies about 2.5 kilometres (1.6 mi) south of the village of Rise, about 3 kilometres (1.9 mi) east of the village of Nævesdal, about 3 kilometres (1.9 mi) north of the village of Lindtveit, and about 7 kilometres (4.3 mi) west of the town of Arendal. The village has an elementary school and preschool as well as a sawmill and some small stores.
