= Nævisdal =

Village in Arendal Municipality, Norway

- Village
- Interactive map of Nævisdal
- Coordinates: 58.4428°N 08.5759°E
- Country: Norway
- Region: Southern Norway
- County: Agder
- District: Østre Agder
- Municipality: Arendal Municipality
- Elevation: 59 m (194 ft)
- Time zone: UTC+01:00 (CET)
  - Summer (DST): UTC+02:00 (CEST)
- Post Code: 4821 Rykene

Nævisdal is a village in Arendal Municipality in Agder county, Norway. The village is located just west of the river Nidelva, about 3 kilometres (1.9 mi) west of the village of Løddesøl.
