= Rykene =

Village in Arendal Municipality, Norway

Rykene Rygene
- Village
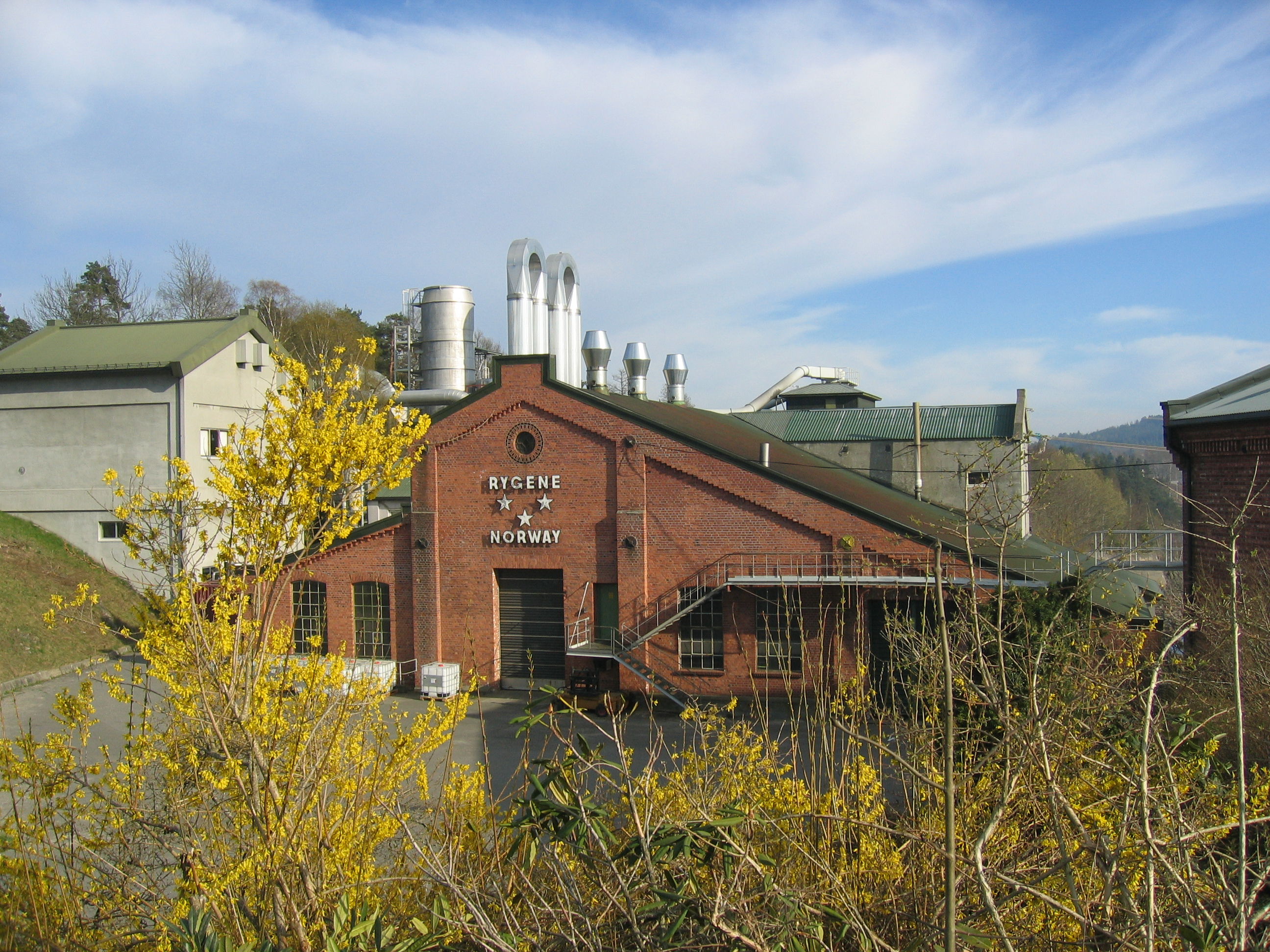
- View of a factory in Rykene
- Interactive map of Rykene
- Coordinates: 58.40974°N 8.63844°E
- Country: Norway
- Region: Southern Norway
- County: Agder
- District: Østre Agder
- Municipality: Arendal Municipality

Area
  - Total: 0.8 km^{2} (0.31 sq mi)
- Elevation: 36 m (118 ft)

Population (2025)
  - Total: 782
  - Density: 978/km^{2} (2,530/sq mi)
- Time zone: UTC+01:00 (CET)
  - Summer (DST): UTC+02:00 (CEST)
- Post Code: 4821 Rykene

Rykene is a village located along the river Nidelva in Agder county, Norway. The village is primarily located in Arendal Municipality, but a small portion of the village lies across the river in the neighboring Grimstad Municipality. Rykene is located about 10 kilometres (6.2 mi) north of the town of Grimstad and about the same distance south of the city of Arendal. Historically, the village grew up due to its close proximity to forests as the timber was floated down river to the sawmills in Rykene. The village of Lindtveit lies about 2 kilometres (1.2 mi) to the northwest, the village of Løddesøl lies about 4 kilometres (2.5 mi) to the north, the village of Gjennestad lies about 3 kilometres (1.9 mi) to the northeast. The village sits at the junction of Norwegian County Road 407 and Norwegian County Road 408.

The 0.8-square-kilometre (200-acre) village has a population (2025) of 782 which gives the village a population density of 978 inhabitants per square kilometre (2,530/sq mi). A small 0.05-square-kilometre (12-acre) of the village (population: 25) lies in Grimstad Municipality on the south side of the river while the rest of the village lies in Arendal Municipality on the north side of the river.

The village sits along the river Nidelva, at a waterfall called Rygene. The village used to have the same name as the waterfall, but the spelling of the village was later changed to Rykene. The name comes from the Old Norse name: rjúkandi which means "smoking", possibly referring to the mist at the base of the waterfall. The name has the same etymology as the town of Rjukan. The waterfall has since been dammed and now is the site of the Rykene Power Station which has a maximum output of 55 megawatts (74,000 hp) and a mean annual output of 316 gigawatt-hours (1,140 TJ).

The local sports team is Rygene IL. The historic Øyestad Church is located just outside of the village.

== Media gallery ==
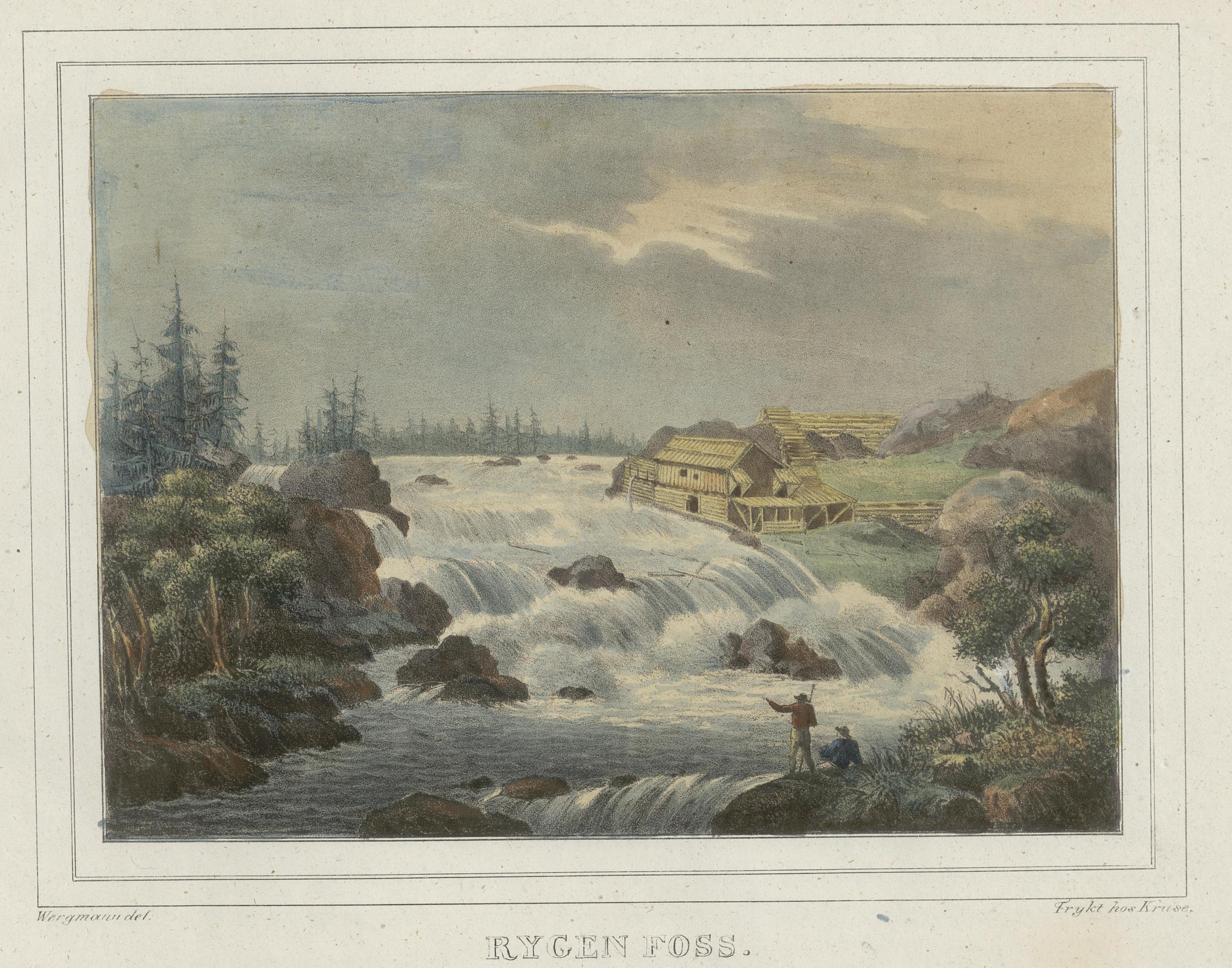
View of the waterfall

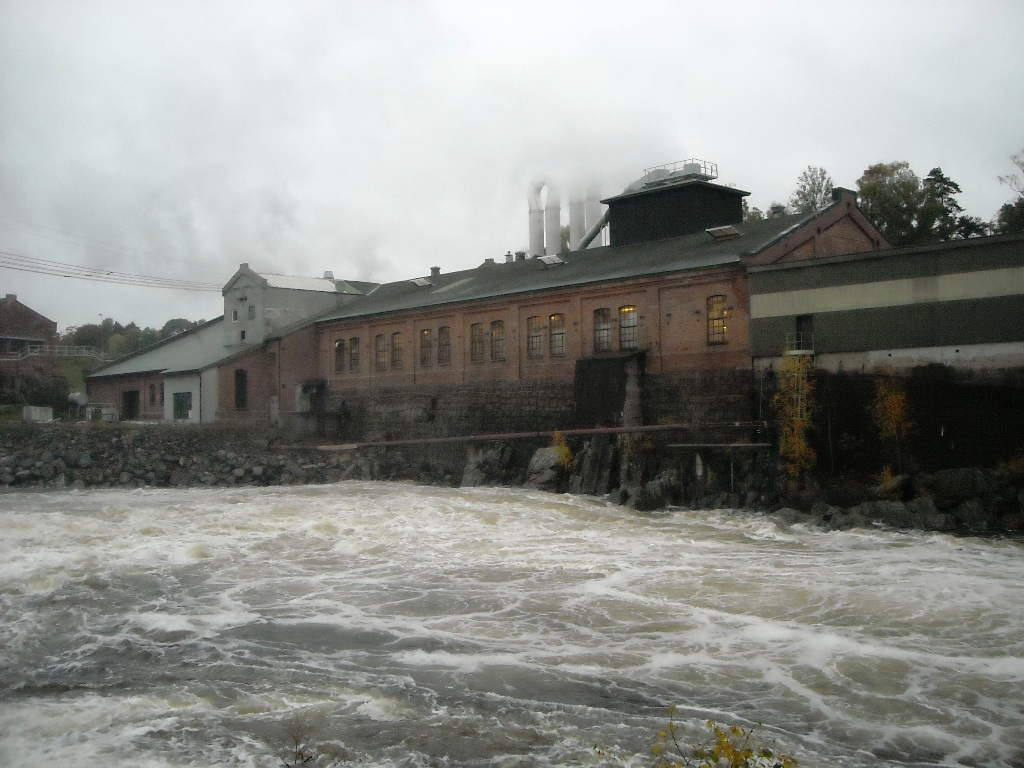
Factory along the river

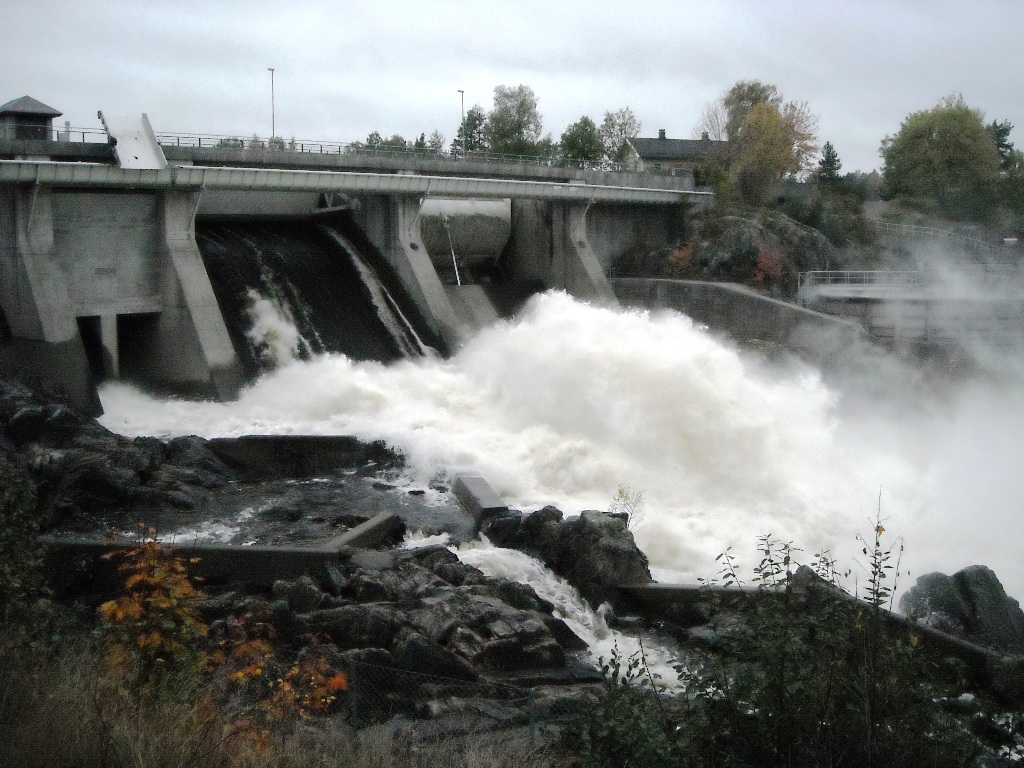
Dam on the waterfall
