= Lindtveit =

Village in Arendal Municipality, Norway

- Village
- Interactive map of Lindtveit
- Coordinates: 58.4193°N 08.6136°E
- Country: Norway
- Region: Southern Norway
- County: Agder
- District: Østre Agder
- Municipality: Arendal Municipality
- Elevation: 51 m (167 ft)
- Time zone: UTC+01:00 (CET)
  - Summer (DST): UTC+02:00 (CEST)
- Post Code: 4821 Rykene

Lindtveit is a village in Arendal Municipality in Agder county, Norway. The village is located just east of the river Nidelva along the Norwegian County Road 408. The village of Rykene is located about 1.5 kilometres (0.93 mi) to the southeast of Lindtveit.
