= Kløcker's House - Arendal Museum =

Museum in Arendal, Norway

Coordinates: 58°27′32″N 8°46′03″E

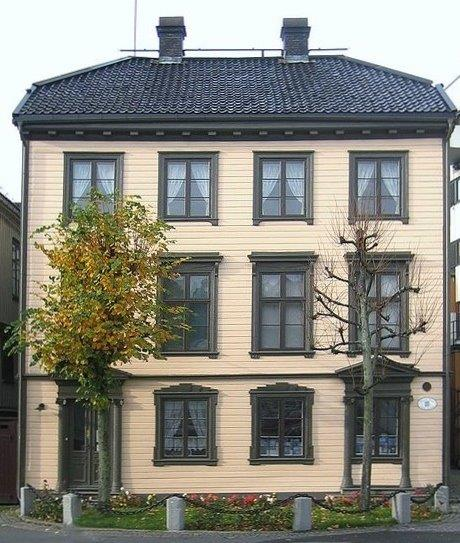
Kløckers Hus, Arendal bymuseum

Kløcker's House - Arendal Museum (Kløckers Hus, Arendal bymuseum) is a museum located centrally in the town of Arendal in Arendal Municipality in Agder county, Norway. It is dedicated to the culture and history of Arendal with a special focus on the Kløcker family.

== History ==
Johannes Nicolai von Kløcker (1788-1862) bought the property and began building the empire-style house in 1824 after he was appointed to the position of Royal Customs Inspector in Arendal. Older buildings were already standing on the property, some of which were spared and incorporated into the new building. The result was a house built in three different centuries. The newest part is a three-story building in typical Empire style, with a large attic, facing the canal (which has since been filled in to make a street) and alley. The back of the house is hidden from view and was built in the 18th century, and a single room in the center of the house has survived from the 17th century. The house was owned and lived in by the Kløcker family for four generations until it was sold to the foundation; Stiftelsen Kløckers Hus - Arendal Bymuseum in 1982.
