= Norwegian County Road 408 =

Road in Agder, Norway

County Road 408
- Bokmål: Fylkesvei 408; Nynorsk: Fylkesveg 408

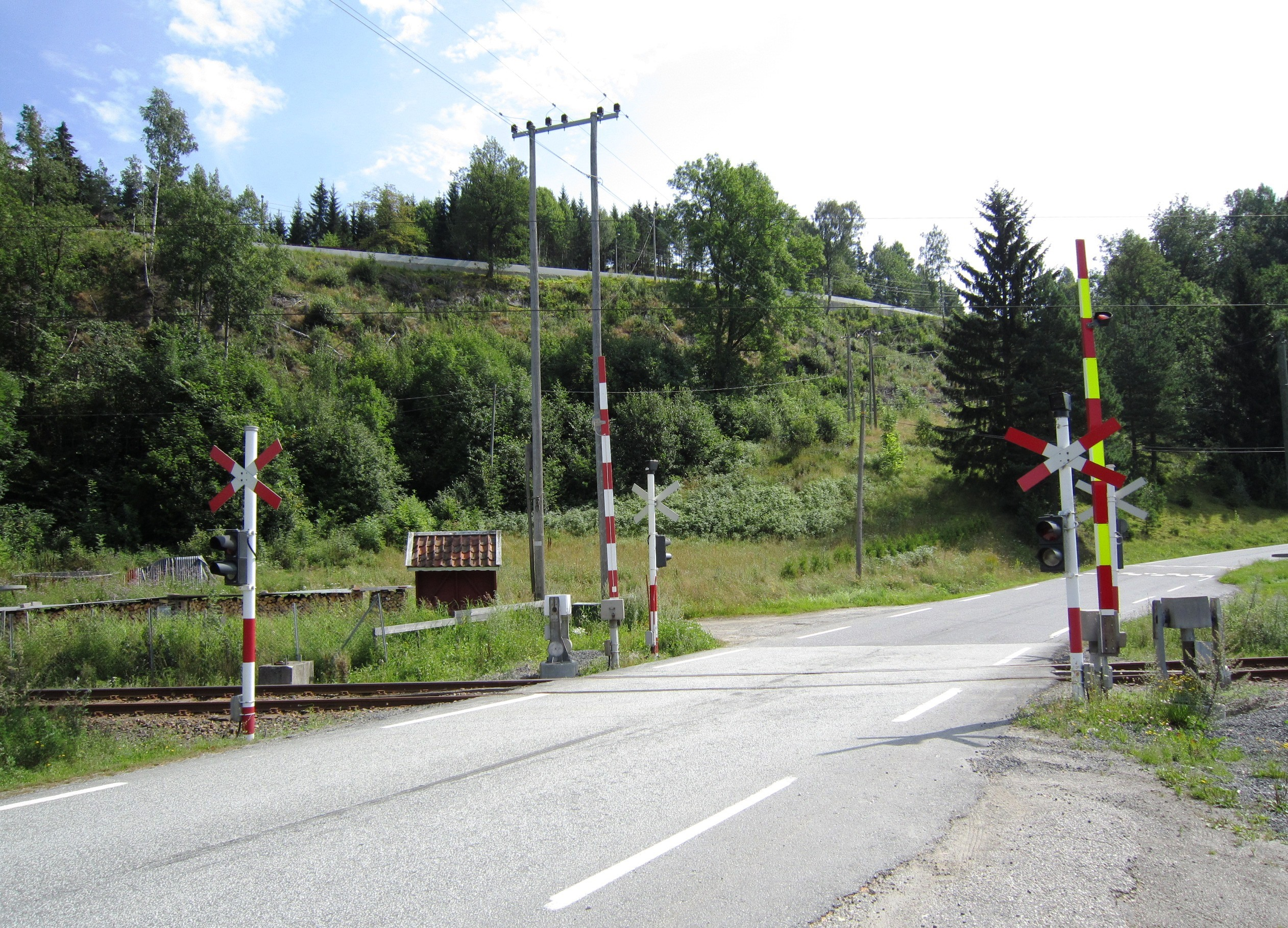
- Fv408 crossing the Arendal railway line at Blakstad

Route information
- Maintained by Norwegian Public Roads Administration
- Length: 12.2 km (7.6 mi)

Major junctions
- North end: Fv42 at Blakstad
- South end: Fv407 at Rykene

Location
- Country: Norway

Highway system
- Roads in Norway; National Roads; County Roads
← Fv407	→ Fv409

Norwegian county road 408 (Fylkesvei 408 or Fv408) is a 12.2-kilometre (7.6 mi) long Norwegian county road which runs between the villages of Blakstad in Froland Municipality and Rykene in Arendal Municipality. The road roughly follows the river Nidelva the whole way. Prior to 2010, this was a Norwegian national road, but in the transportation reforms that year, the road was transferred to county control.

The road begins in the village of Blakstad in Froland Municipality. In Froland, the road is called Messelveien. The road begins at a junction with Norwegian County Road 42 and it runs south along the Arendalsbanen railway line. After about 4 kilometres (2.5 mi), the road enters Arendal Municipality where it is also known as the Jernbaneveien (lit. 'the railroad road'). The road passes through the villages of Rise and Løddesøl, Lindtveit, and finally Rykene where it ends at the junction with Norwegian County Road 407.
