= Magnhild Lien =

Norwegian mathematician

Magnhild Lien is a Norwegian mathematician specializing in knot theory. She is a professor emeritus of mathematics at California State University, Northridge, and the former executive director of the Association for Women in Mathematics.

== Education and career ==
Lien was born on the southern Norwegian island of Tromøya, now located in Arendal Municipality, where she grew up as the youngest of six children and the only girl in her family. She earned a bachelor's degree from McGill University in 1979, and completed her Ph.D. in 1984 from the University of Iowa. Her dissertation, Construction of High Dimensional Knot Groups from Classical Knot Groups, was supervised by Jonathan Kalman Simon.

She joined the faculty at California State University, Northridge in 1987, and served as department chair of mathematics there from 1998 to 2006. She was executive director of the Association for Women in Mathematics from 2012 to 2018.

== Contributions ==
As well as publishing her own mathematical research on knot theory, Lien has written about women in mathematics in collaboration with her husband, sociologist Harvey Rich.

== Recognition ==
Lien was included in the 2019 class of fellows of the Association for Women in Mathematics "for extraordinary leadership and service devoted to advancing and supporting women in the mathematical sciences, as AWM executive director and, for a quarter century, as initiator, director, and fundraiser of programs for women".
