= Norwegian County Road 178 =

Road in Ullensaker, Norway

Coordinates: 60°07′59″N 11°05′31″E

County Road 178
- Bokmål: Fylkesvei 178; Nynorsk: Fylkesveg 178

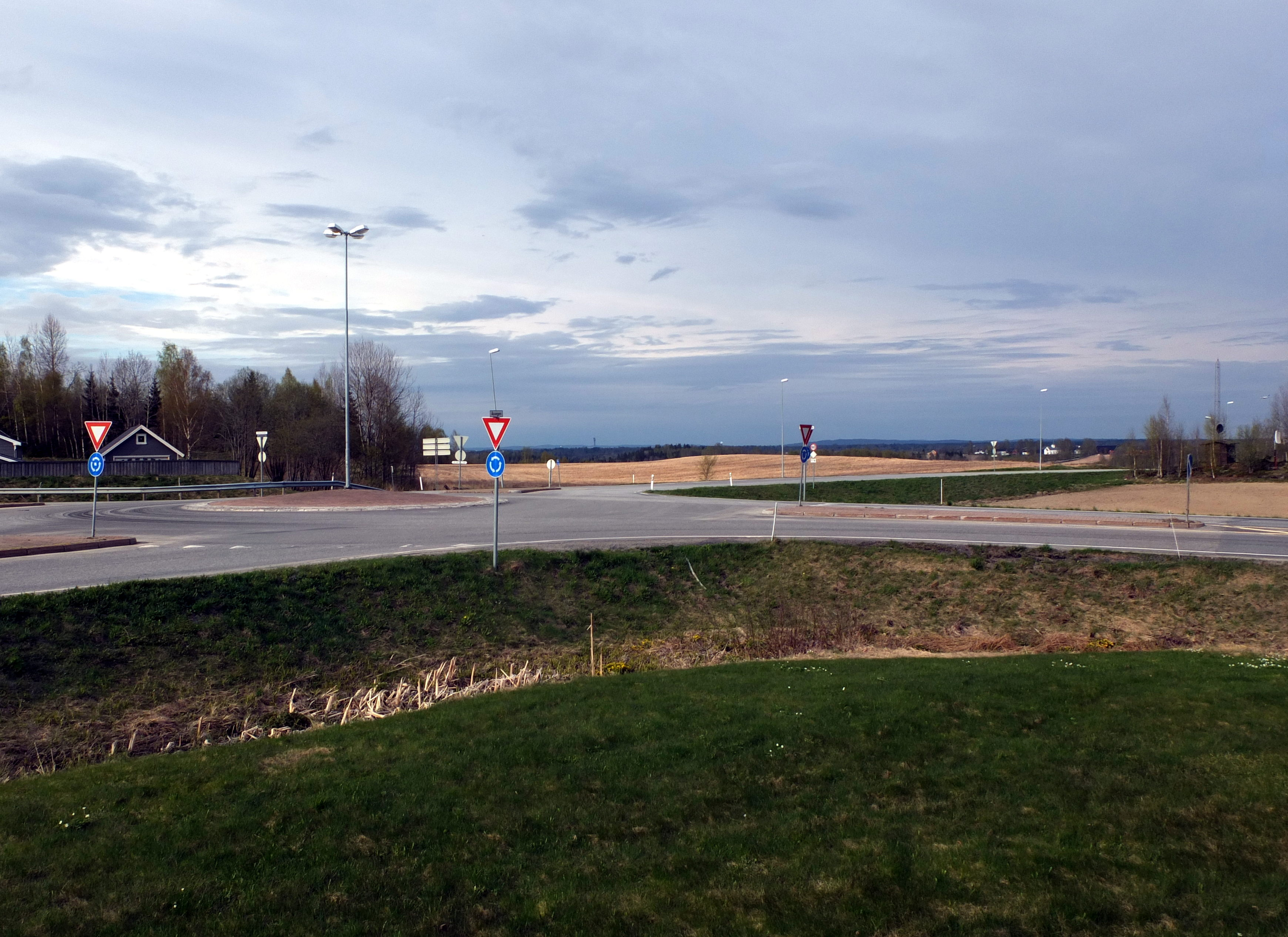

Route information
- Length: 11.1 km (6.9 mi)

Location
- Country: Norway

Highway system
- Roads in Norway; National Roads; County Roads

County Road 178 (Norwegian: Fylkesvei 178 or Fv178) runs between Eltonåsen in Nannestad and Jessheim in Ullensaker, Norway. The road is 11.1 kilometers (6.9 mi) long. Prior to 1 January 2010, the road was a national road, but after reclassification, it became a county road.
