= Axel Nicolai Herlofson =

Norwegian fraudster

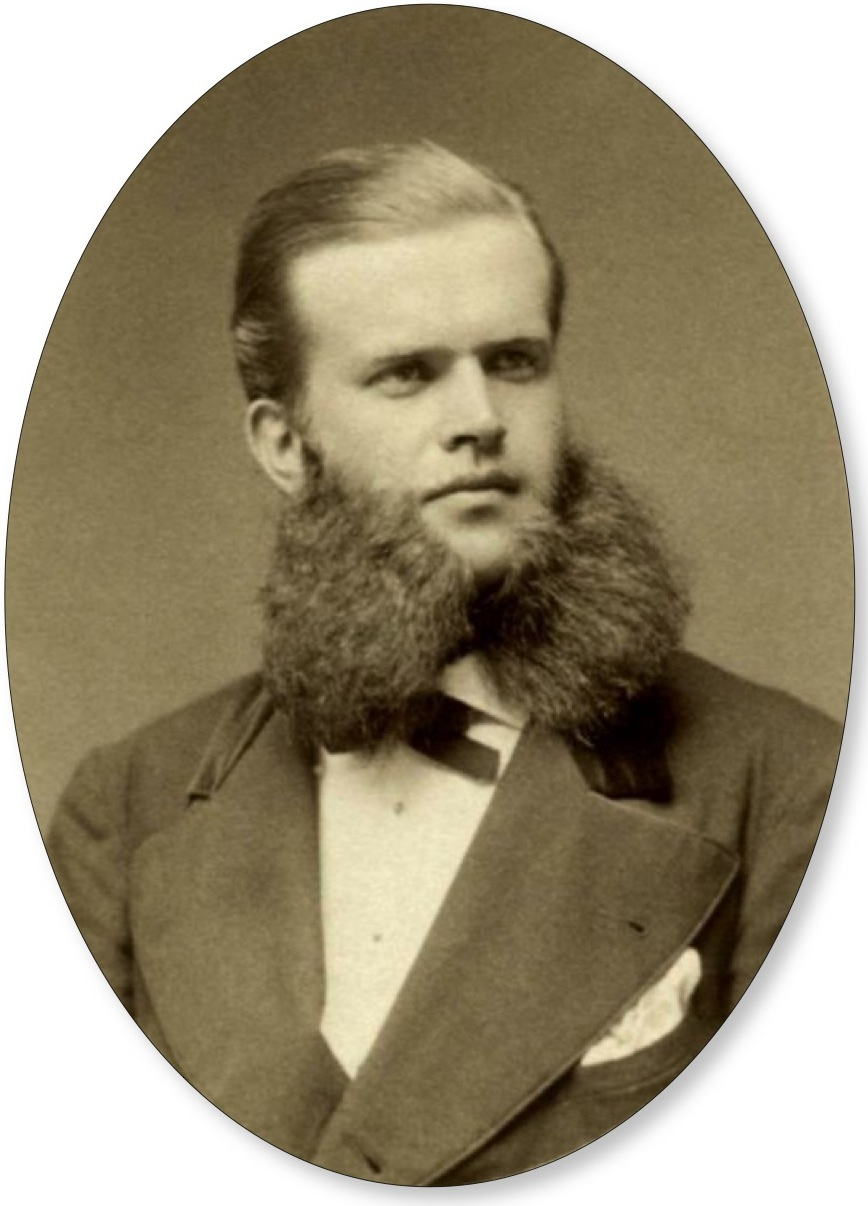
Axel Nicolai Herlofson

Axel Nicolai Herlofson (29 August 1845 in Østre Moland – 1910 in Christiania) was a Norwegian fraudster who is known for causing the Arendal crash, after defrauding customers and co-owners of Arendals Privatbank which he had co-founded in 1874. His scheme had some similarities to a Ponzi scheme, and he had systemically falsified the bank's accounts for several years to cover up being insolvent. In 1886 the bank went bankrupt, and an investigation of Herlofson was initiated. He attempted to flee the country, but was arrested in the last minute and sentenced to six years imprisonment with hard labour, which he served in Norway's strictest prison at Akershus Fortress. He died in Christiania.

He was the son of businessman Nicolai Benjamin Aall Herlofson (1807-1884) and Elisabeth Catharine Cappelen (1809-1880). His mother was a daughter of the politician Diderik von Cappelen.
