= Arendal crash =

Economic crisis in Norway

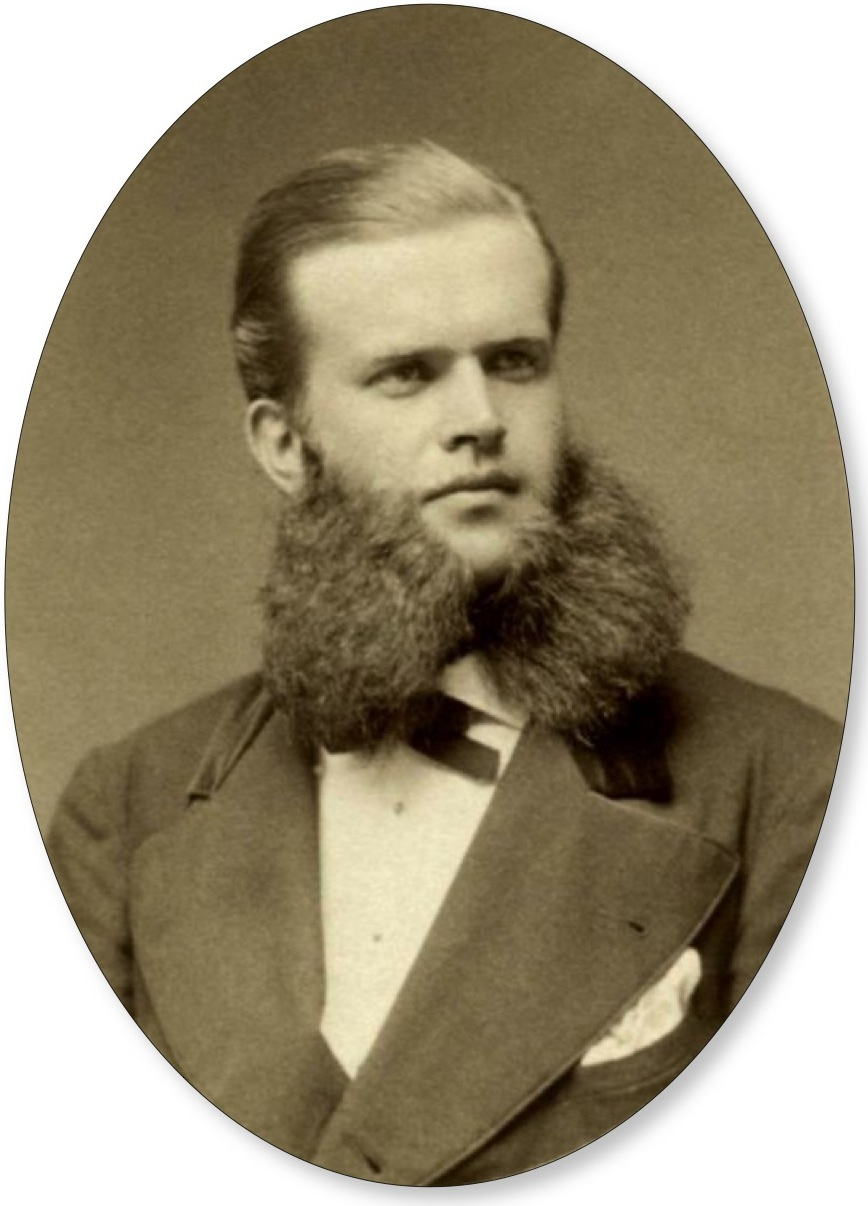
Axel Nicolai Herlofson, who defrauded customers of Arendals Privatbank and thereby caused the Arendal crash

The Arendal crash (Arendalskrakket) was an economic crisis in Arendal, Norway, that occurred when the bank Arendals Privatbank went bankrupt in 1886 and the bank's co-owner Axel Nicolai Herlofson was revealed to have defrauded customers and co-owners systemically. The crash led to several other bankruptcies and unemployment in Southern Norway, and marked the end of Arendal as an important shipping town. It took over 80 years to overcome the effects of the crash. Herlofson was sentenced to six years penal labour. Only two years after its start in 1874, the bank was in reality bankrupt, but the bank was continued for nine years due to corruption and poor routines or a lack of routines. The debt to Herlofson, his brother Oskar and Strømsbu sag was finally NOK 12 million, corresponding to the entire wealth of Kristiansand's population, or six billion 2012 kroner.

== Literature ==
- Johannes G. Torstveit: Storsvindel bankkrakk og nytt politisk parti 1886-88, Arendal 1886-1888, Arendals Tidende, 2012
- Axel Christian Rosenkrantz Smith: Av en ældre Arendalsmands erindringer fra de sidste 50 aar (1870–1920). I Arendal fra fortid til nutid. Utgitt ved byens 200-års jubileum som kjøpestad 7. mai 1923
