= Norwegian County Road 171 =

County road in Norway

Coordinates: 60°01′35″N 11°10′37″E

County Road 171

Route information
- Length: 30.4 km (18.9 mi)

Location
- Country: Norway

Highway system
- Roads in Norway; National Roads; County Roads

County Road 171 (Norwegian: Riksvei 171) is a 30.4 kilometres (18.9 mi) county road that runs between Gran in Sørum and Finstadbråten, Aursmoen in Aurskog-Høland, Norway.
