= Halvor Løvold =

Norwegian naval officer and politician

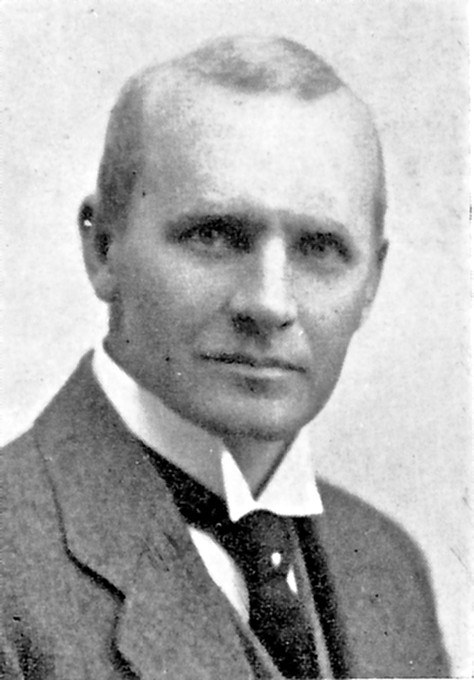
- Born: 14 May 1875; Øyestad Municipality, Norway
- Died: October 20, 1950 (aged 75)
- Occupations: Naval officer Politician

Halvor Løvold (14 May 1875–20 Oct 1950) was a Norwegian naval officer and politician.

He was born in Øyestad Municipality to merchant Thomas Løvold and Birgithe Jensen. From 1907 to 1945 he was appointed managing director in Arendals Dampskibsselskab. He was elected representative to the Storting for the periods 1916–1918 and 1931–1933, for the Conservative Party. He was decorated Knight, First Class of the Order of St. Olav in 1932.
