= Arendal Municipality =

Municipality in Agder, Norway

Arendal Municipality Arendal kommune
- Municipality
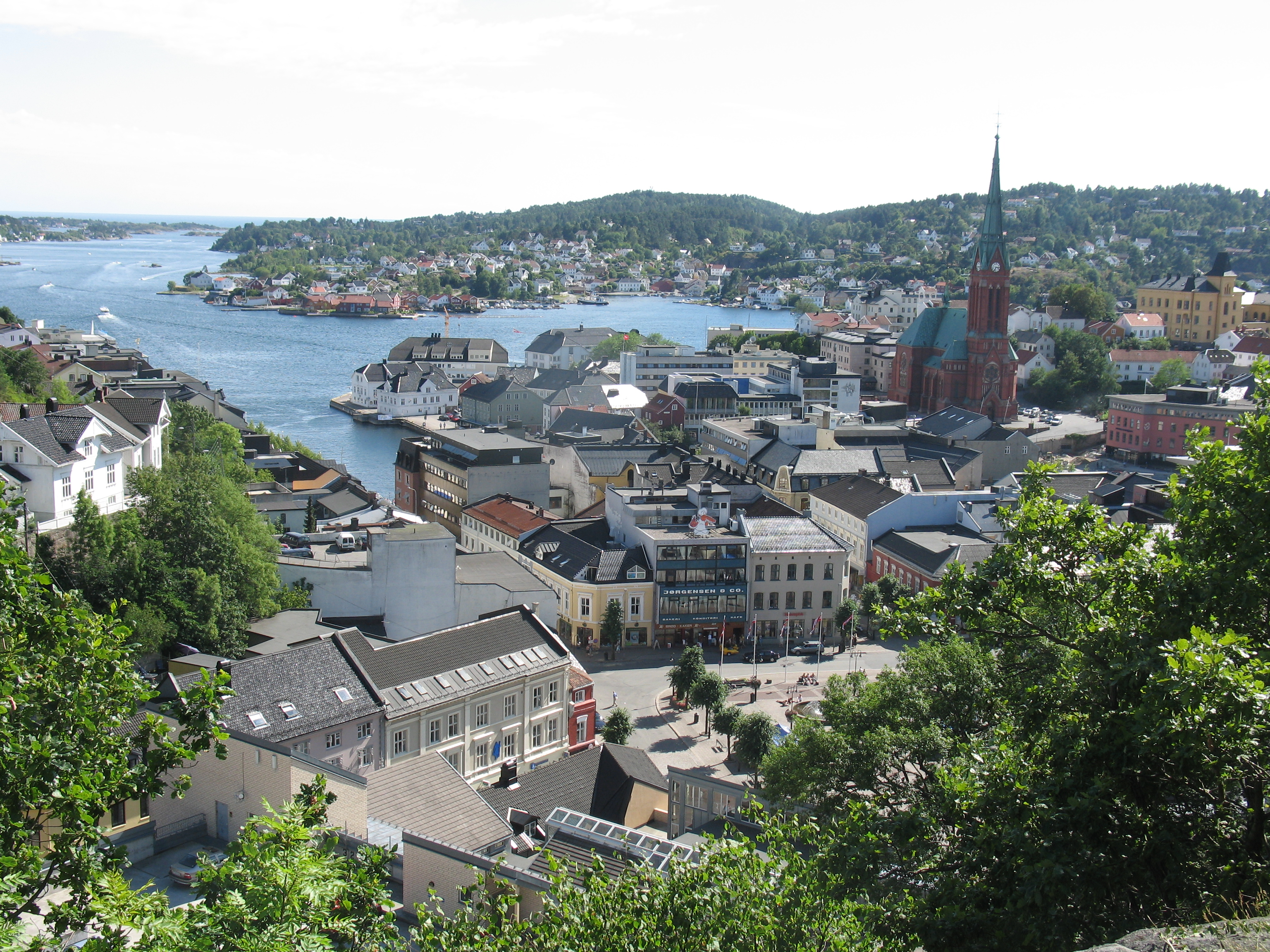
- View of Arendal's city centre in August 2006

- Flag Coat of arms

- Agder within Norway

- Arendal within Agder
- Coordinates: 58°27′39″N 08°45′59″E
- Country: Norway
- County: Agder
- District: Sørlandet
- Established: 1 Jan 1838
  - Created as: Formannskapsdistrikt
- Administrative centre: Arendal

Government
  - Mayor (2015): Robert Cornels Nordli (Ap)

Area
  - Total: 270.2 km^{2} (104.3 sq mi)
  - Land: 255.14 km^{2} (98.51 sq mi)
  - Water: 15.06 km^{2} (5.81 sq mi) 5.6%
  - Rank: #273 in Norway
- Highest elevation: 268.61 m (881.3 ft)

Population (2026)
  - Total: 46,603
  - Rank: #24 in Norway
  - Density: 182.7/km^{2} (473/sq mi)
  - Change (10 years): ▲ +5.2%
- Demonym: Arendalitt

Official language
  - Norwegian form: Bokmål
- Time zone: UTC+01:00 (CET)
  - Summer (DST): UTC+02:00 (CEST)
- ISO 3166 code: NO-4203
- Website: Official website

Arendal (Urban East Norwegian pronunciation: [ˈɑ̂ːɳɖɑːɫ]) is a municipality in Agder county in southeastern Norway. Arendal Municipality belongs to the region of Sørlandet. The administrative centre of the municipality is the city of Arendal (which is also the seat of Agder county). Some of the notable villages in the municipality include Rykene, Eydehavn, Færvik, Brekka i Moland, Brekka i Tromøya, Flosta, Strengereid, Kongshavn, Kilsund, Brattekleiv, Torsbudalen, Longum, Saltrød, Staubø, Vrengen, and Kolbjørnsvik. The offices of UNEP/GRID-Arendal are also located in the city of Arendal.

The 270.2-square-kilometre (104.3 sq mi) municipality is the 273rd largest by area out of the 357 municipalities in Norway. Arendal Municipality is the 24th most populous municipality in Norway with a population of 46,603. The municipality's population density is 182.7 inhabitants per square kilometre (473/sq mi) and its population has increased by 5.2% over the previous 10-year period.

== General information ==
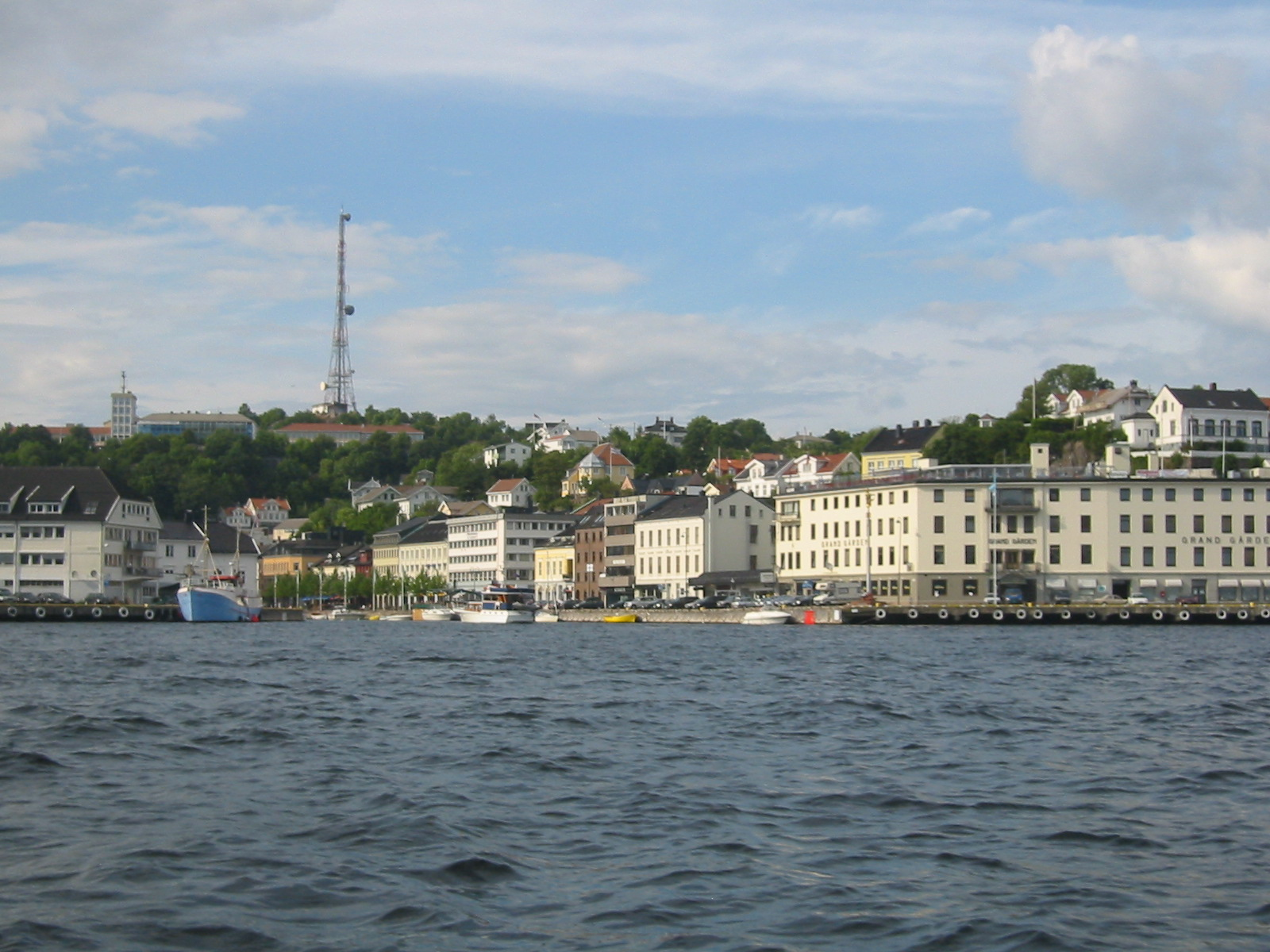
Arendal viewed from the harbour

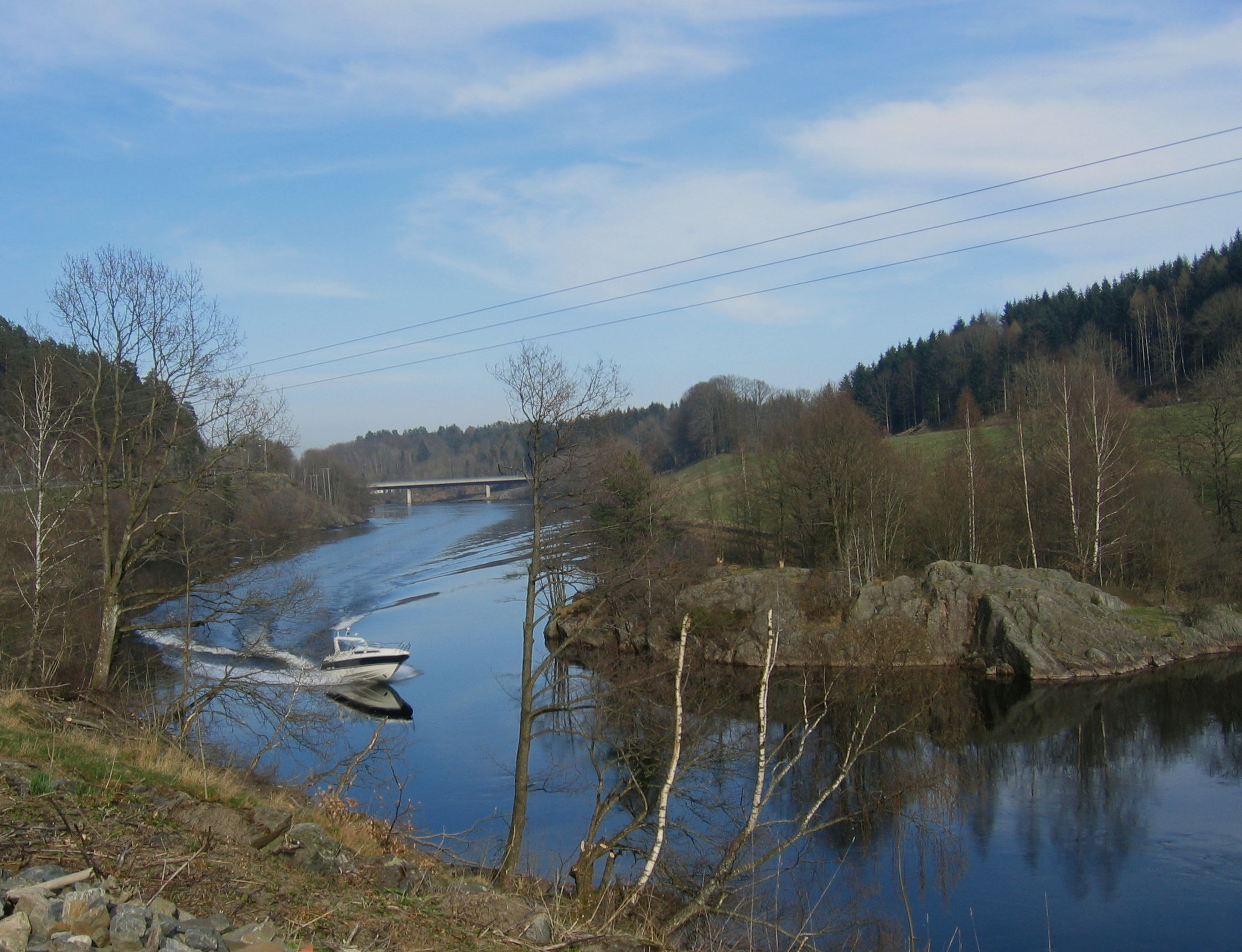
River Nidelva in Arendal

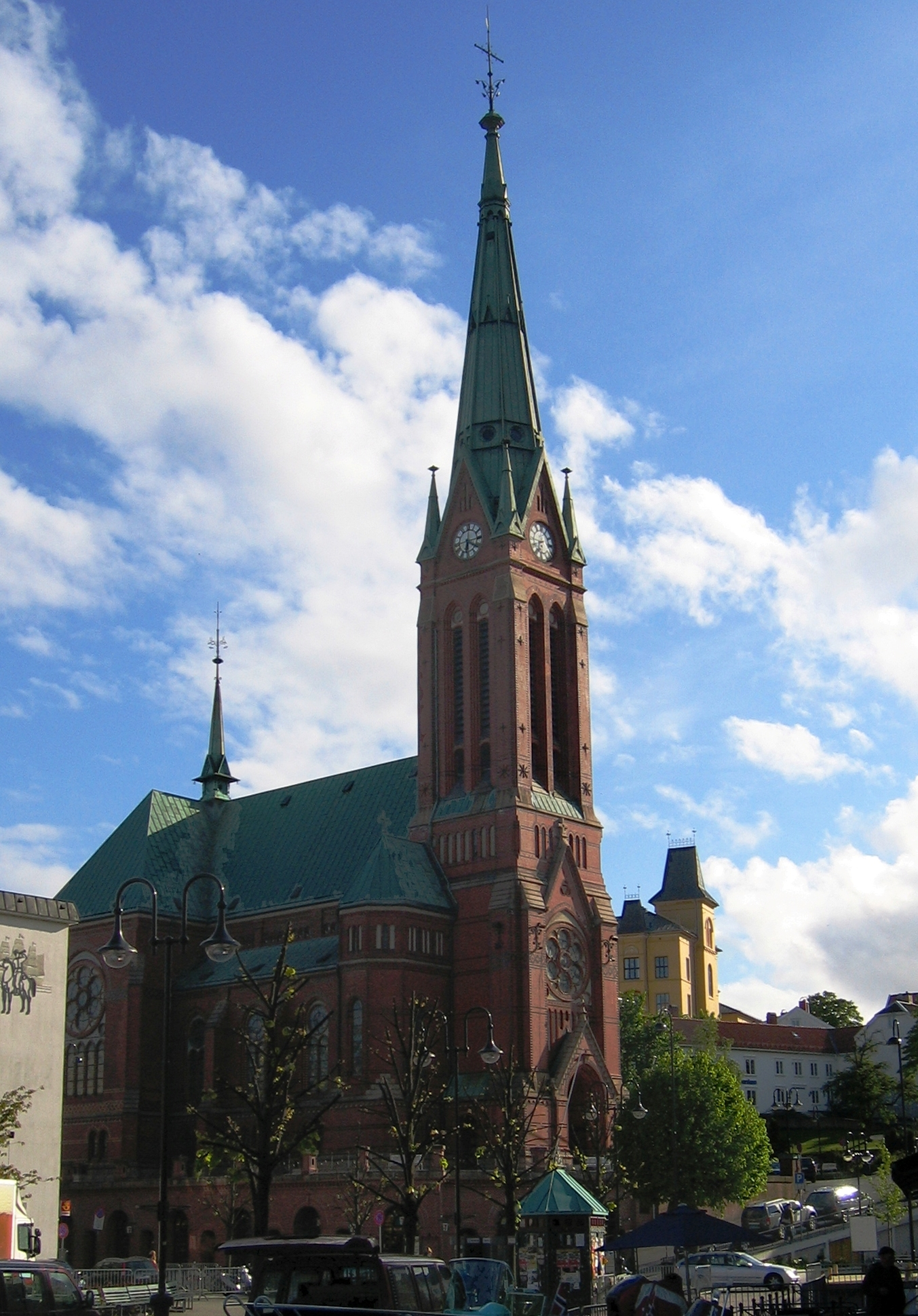
Trinity Church (Arendal)

=== Administrative history ===
The town of Arendal was established as a municipality on 1 January 1838 (see formannskapsdistrikt law). On 1 January 1875, a rural area in the western part of Arendal Municipality was removed from the town and moved to neighboring municipalities. The westernmost part (population: 52) became part of Øiestad Municipality and the rest (population: 22) became part of Østre Moland Municipality.

On 1 January 1902, Barbu Municipality (population: 6,787) was dissolved and it was merged into Arendal Municipality, greatly increasing the size of Arendal. In 1944, a small area of Austre Moland Municipality (population: 21) was transferred into Arendal Municipality as well.

On 1 January 1992, a major municipal merger vastly expanded Arendal Municipality when the following areas were merged:

- all of Arendal Municipality (population: 12,478)
- all of Hisøy Municipality (population: 4,026)
- all of Moland Municipality (population: 8,148)
- all of Tromøy Municipality (population: 4,711)
- all of Øyestad Municipality (population: 8,679)

In 2020, there were many municipal and county mergers across Norway due to the work of the Solberg cabinet. Historically, this municipality was part of the old Aust-Agder county. On 1 January 2020, the municipality became a part of the newly-formed Agder county (after Aust-Agder and Vest-Agder counties were merged).

=== Name ===
The Old Norse form of the name was probably Arnardalr. The first element is the genitive case of ǫrn which means "eagle". The last element is dalr which means "valley" or "dale", thus meaning the "valley of the eagle".

A link for the name also has been theorized to the Vasconic substrate hypothesis, for similarity to placenames like Val d'Aran and Arundel.

=== Coat of arms ===
The coat of arms was granted on 7 November 1924 (based upon an older seal). The blazon is "Per fess, Azure with a three-masted ship argent over barry wavy of seven argent and azure". This means the arms have a blue field (background) and the charge is an 18th-century, three-masted sailing ship above seven, thin, wavy stripes. The charge has a tincture of argent which means it is commonly colored white, but if it is made out of metal, then silver is used. The arms usually have a gold mural crown above the shield. The design was chosen as a symbol for the importance of fisheries and sailing to the local economy. A ship appeared on the oldest known seal of the town, dating back to the 17th century. In the late 19th and early 20th century the arms showed the ship in the upper part and a landscape with the coat of arms of Norway in the base of the shield. The arms were designed by Miss C. Aubert who based it off a draft by Fred Barth. The municipal flag has the same design as the coat of arms.

=== Churches ===
The Church of Norway has six parishes (sokn) within Arendal Municipality. It is part of the Arendal prosti (deanery) in the Diocese of Agder og Telemark.

Churches in Arendal Municipality
Parish (sokn)	Church name	Location of the church	Year built
Barbu	Barbu Church	Barbu	1880
Hisøy	Hisøy Church	His	1849
Moland	Austre Moland Church	Brekka	1673
Moland	Flosta Church	Flosta	1632
Moland	Stokken Church	Saltrød	1878
Trefoldighet	Trinity Church	Arendal	1888
Tromøy	Færvik Church	Færvik	1884
Tromøy	Tromøy Church	Brekka	c. 1150
Øyestad	Bjorbekk Church	Bjorbekk	1884
Øyestad	Engene Church	Nedenes	1849
Øyestad	Øyestad Church	Rykene	c. 1200

== History ==
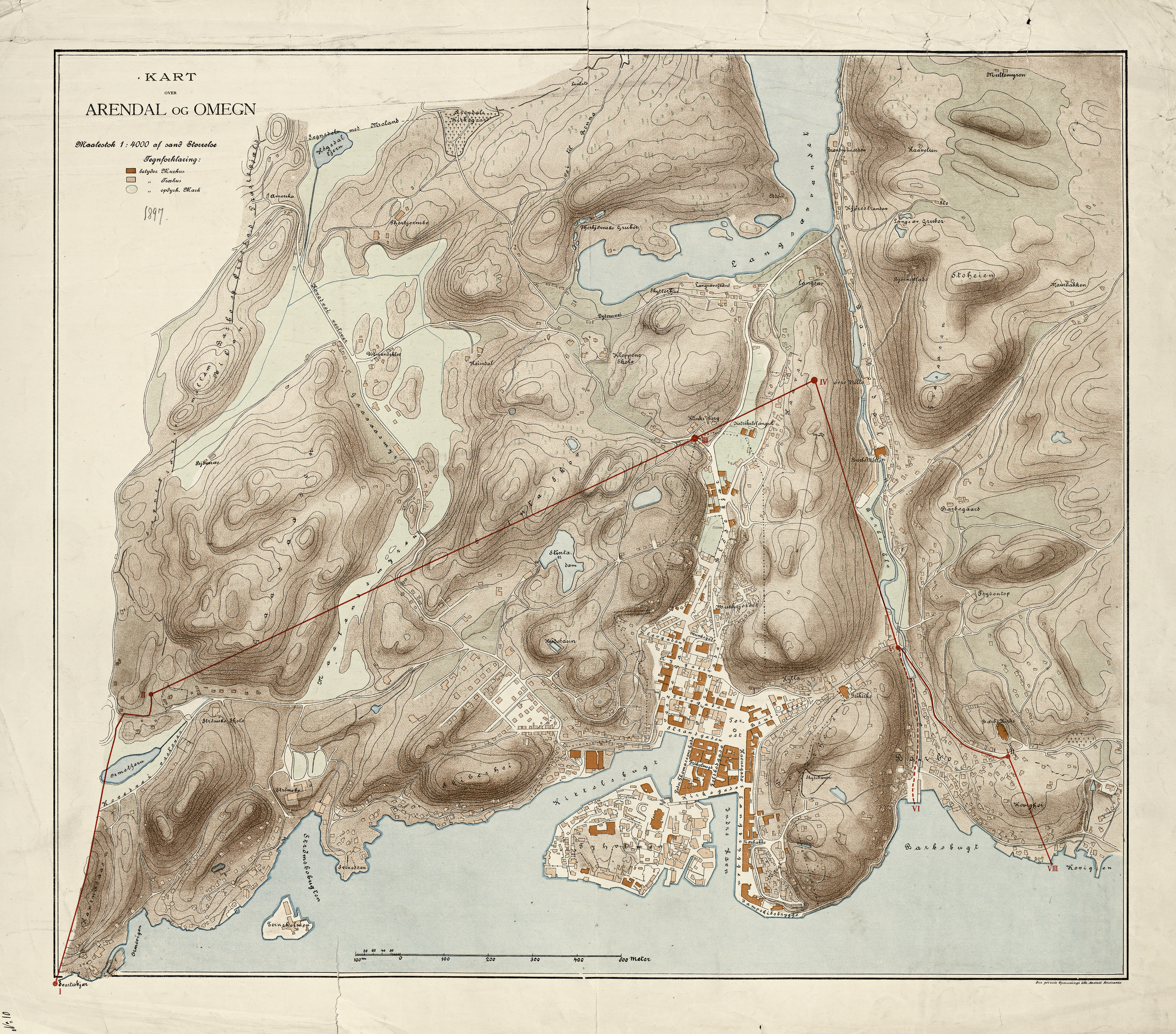
Map of Arendal from 1897

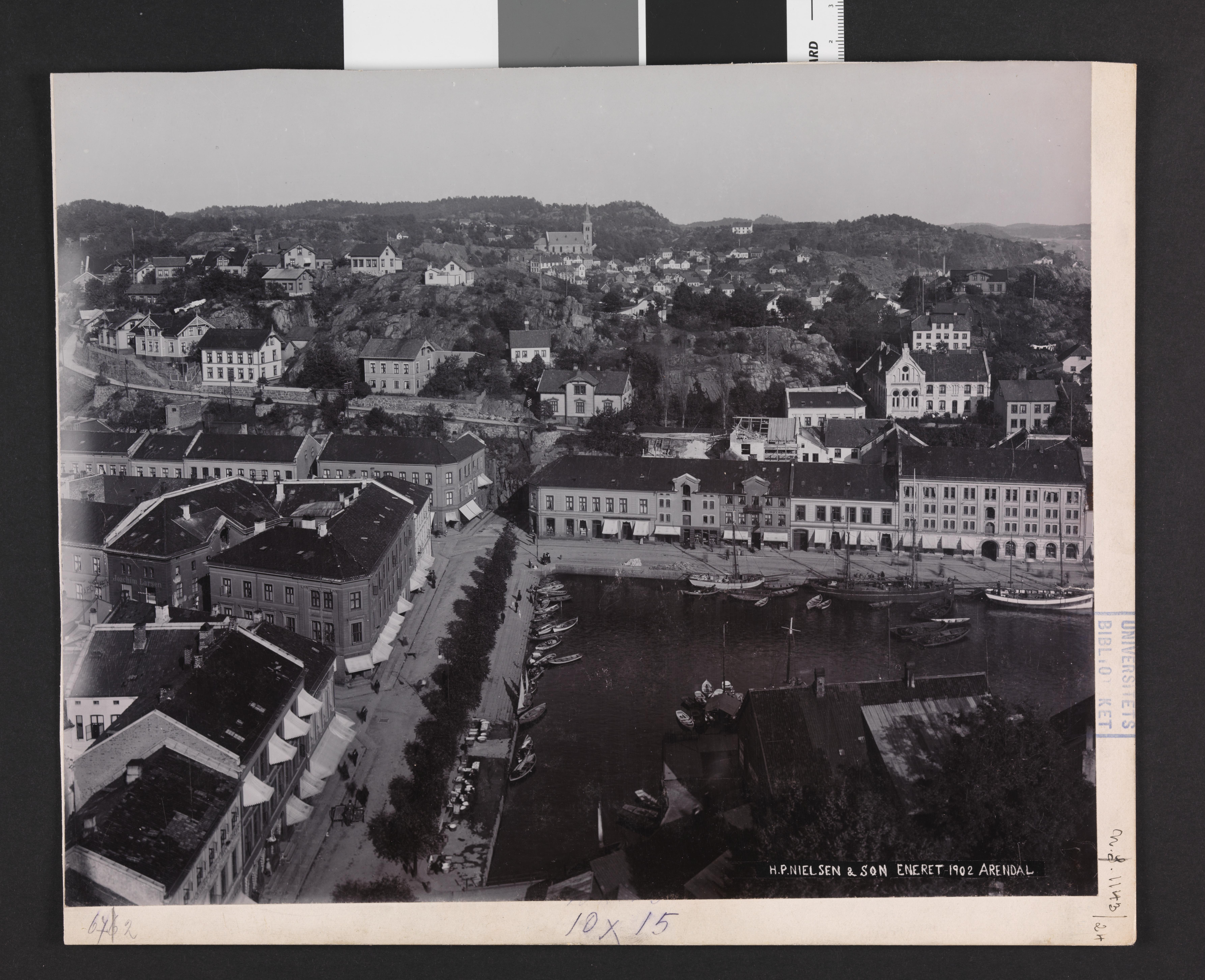
View of Arendal in 1902

The village of Arendal was established in the middle of the 16th century, and was then called Arendall. Initially, it had no formal town status.

When the town of Christianssand was founded by King Christian IV in 1641, he granted the citizens a monopoly on all trade in Nedenæs and Lister og Mandal counties (including the area of Arendal). This grant (ladested rights), intended to subsidize Christianssand and its fortifications, placed existing towns in a difficult position. Both towns and the peasants in the rural countryside protested the hardships this caused. As a result, Arendal received royal permission in 1622 to continue as a loading-place for timber until a means could be found to transfer its trade to Christianssand.

The town of Arendal was given market city (kjøpstad) privileges in 1723. However the peasants in the surrounding district, who by law were to sell their goods only at Arendal, were smuggling their goods out on cutters and selling them in Denmark, in the Baltic, and in Great Britain.

This continued until 1735, when Arendal was granted a full town charter. This charter, combined with Danish imposition of a monopoly on grain imports, caused great poverty and starvation among the peasants in the surrounding districts, leading to several famous rebellions.

As a result of the rebellions, the age of privileges for towns like Christianssand and Arendal came to an apparent end in 1768 by royal proclamation. But the problems did not end then; a farmer, Christian Jensen Lofthuus, in nearby Vestre Moland led a rebellion in 1786 which resulted in the government actually remedying some of the most repressive trade policies, but Lofthus died in prison. The charges against Lofthus were that he dealt in grain and other commodities to the detriment to Arendal's privileges.

Shipping, shipbuilding, and timber trade as well as mining and ironworks were important branches of industry in Nedenæs county for many centuries, especially in the Arendal region. Frequent contacts with the world abroad put their mark on the local culture and traditions. In 1880, it was the country's biggest port in terms of tonnage handled. At the end of the 19th century, Arendal was recognized as a major shipping centre with many wealthy shipowners. However, this came to an end following the 1886 Arendal crash, in which Axel Nicolai Herlofson had defrauded many bank customers in the city, leading to bankruptcies and extreme unemployment. At one point in the middle of the 18th century, Arendal was one of Norway's biggest mining towns. The main production consisted of iron ore and magnetite.

Around the turn of the twentieth century, when thousands of Norwegians sought to take advantage of the more stable economic climate of the United States by emigrating, many of those from Arendal took their economic traditions with them. In New York City and the surrounding areas, a great deal of Americans who claim Norwegian ancestry can trace their roots to Arendal, as a great deal of Norwegian sailors, trimmers, shipbuilders, and carpenters from Arendal settled in areas of New York such as Brooklyn, Port Richmond (Staten Island), and several industrial centers in northern New Jersey such as Jersey City, Bayonne, Perth Amboy, and Elizabeth. In 1939, Arendal had the 4th largest Norwegian tanker fleet; only Oslo, Bergen, and Stavanger were larger.

During the German invasion of Norway on 9 April 1940, Arendal was captured by the German torpedo boat Greif.

Today, the town has small boat manufacturing, mechanical industry, electronics industry, as well as one of the world's largest silicon carbide refining plants.

The municipality had a prison (Arendal Prison), however Agder Prison opened in 2020; Arendal Prison was sold the next year.

== Government ==
Arendal Municipality is responsible for primary education (through 10th grade), outpatient health services, senior citizen services, welfare and other social services, zoning, economic development, and municipal roads and utilities. The municipality is governed by a municipal council of directly elected representatives. The mayor is indirectly elected by a vote of the municipal council. The municipality is under the jurisdiction of the Agder District Court and the Agder Court of Appeal.

=== Municipal council ===
The municipal council (Kommunestyre) of Arendal Municipality is made up of 39 representatives that are elected to four year terms. The tables below show the current and historical composition of the council by political party.

Arendal kommunestyre 2023–2027
Party name (in Norwegian)	Number of representatives
Labour Party (Arbeiderpartiet)	13
Progress Party (Fremskrittspartiet)	7
Conservative Party (Høyre)	7
Christian Democratic Party (Kristelig Folkeparti)	2
Pensioners' Party (Pensjonistpartiet)	1
Red Party (Rødt)	1
Centre Party (Senterpartiet)	1
Socialist Left Party (Sosialistisk Venstreparti)	5
Liberal Party (Venstre)	1
Healthcare Party (Helsepartiet)	1
Total number of members:	39

Arendal kommunestyre 2019–2023
Party name (in Norwegian)	Number of representatives
Labour Party (Arbeiderpartiet)	11
Progress Party (Fremskrittspartiet)	5
Green Party (Miljøpartiet De Grønne)	1
Conservative Party (Høyre)	8
Christian Democratic Party (Kristelig Folkeparti)	2
Pensioners' Party (Pensjonistpartiet)	1
Red Party (Rødt)	1
Centre Party (Senterpartiet)	3
Socialist Left Party (Sosialistisk Venstreparti)	3
Liberal Party (Venstre)	1
Healthcare Party (Helsepartiet)	1
Hove List (Hovelista)	2
Total number of members:	39

Arendal kommunestyre 2015–2019
Party name (in Norwegian)	Number of representatives
Labour Party (Arbeiderpartiet)	15
Progress Party (Fremskrittspartiet)	6
Green Party (Miljøpartiet De Grønne)	1
Conservative Party (Høyre)	8
Christian Democratic Party (Kristelig Folkeparti)	3
Pensioners' Party (Pensjonistpartiet)	1
Centre Party (Senterpartiet)	1
Socialist Left Party (Sosialistisk Venstreparti)	2
Liberal Party (Venstre)	2
Total number of members:	39

Arendal kommunestyre 2011–2015
Party name (in Norwegian)	Number of representatives
Labour Party (Arbeiderpartiet)	9
Progress Party (Fremskrittspartiet)	6
Conservative Party (Høyre)	12
Christian Democratic Party (Kristelig Folkeparti)	3
Pensioners' Party (Pensjonistpartiet)	2
Centre Party (Senterpartiet)	1
Socialist Left Party (Sosialistisk Venstreparti)	3
Liberal Party (Venstre)	3
Total number of members:	39

Arendal kommunestyre 2007–2011
Party name (in Norwegian)	Number of representatives
Labour Party (Arbeiderpartiet)	12
Progress Party (Fremskrittspartiet)	8
Conservative Party (Høyre)	6
Christian Democratic Party (Kristelig Folkeparti)	4
Pensioners' Party (Pensjonistpartiet)	2
Centre Party (Senterpartiet)	2
Socialist Left Party (Sosialistisk Venstreparti)	3
Liberal Party (Venstre)	2
Total number of members:	39

Arendal kommunestyre 2003–2007
Party name (in Norwegian)	Number of representatives
Labour Party (Arbeiderpartiet)	9
Progress Party (Fremskrittspartiet)	9
Conservative Party (Høyre)	7
Christian Democratic Party (Kristelig Folkeparti)	4
Pensioners' Party (Pensjonistpartiet)	2
Centre Party (Senterpartiet)	1
Socialist Left Party (Sosialistisk Venstreparti)	6
Liberal Party (Venstre)	1
Total number of members:	39

Arendal kommunestyre 1999–2003
Party name (in Norwegian)	Number of representatives
Labour Party (Arbeiderpartiet)	12
Progress Party (Fremskrittspartiet)	7
Conservative Party (Høyre)	7
Christian Democratic Party (Kristelig Folkeparti)	6
Centre Party (Senterpartiet)	1
Socialist Left Party (Sosialistisk Venstreparti)	3
Liberal Party (Venstre)	1
Cross-party list (Tverrpolitisk liste)	2
Total number of members:	39

Arendal kommunestyre 1995–1999
Party name (in Norwegian)	Number of representatives
Labour Party (Arbeiderpartiet)	16
Progress Party (Fremskrittspartiet)	6
Conservative Party (Høyre)	10
Christian Democratic Party (Kristelig Folkeparti)	6
Pensioners' Party (Pensjonistpartiet)	5
Centre Party (Senterpartiet)	4
Socialist Left Party (Sosialistisk Venstreparti)	3
Liberal Party (Venstre)	3
Total number of members:	53

Arendal kommunestyre 1991–1995
Party name (in Norwegian)	Number of representatives
Labour Party (Arbeiderpartiet)	13
Progress Party (Fremskrittspartiet)	3
Conservative Party (Høyre)	10
Christian Democratic Party (Kristelig Folkeparti)	4
Pensioners' Party (Pensjonistpartiet)	9
Centre Party (Senterpartiet)	7
Socialist Left Party (Sosialistisk Venstreparti)	4
Liberal Party (Venstre)	3
Total number of members:	53

Arendal kommunestyre 1987–1991
Party name (in Norwegian)	Number of representatives
Labour Party (Arbeiderpartiet)	19
Progress Party (Fremskrittspartiet)	5
Conservative Party (Høyre)	15
Christian Democratic Party (Kristelig Folkeparti)	6
Socialist Left Party (Sosialistisk Venstreparti)	2
Liberal Party (Venstre)	6
Total number of members:	53

Arendal kommunestyre 1983–1987
Party name (in Norwegian)	Number of representatives
Labour Party (Arbeiderpartiet)	19
Progress Party (Fremskrittspartiet)	2
Conservative Party (Høyre)	18
Christian Democratic Party (Kristelig Folkeparti)	7
Centre Party (Senterpartiet)	1
Socialist Left Party (Sosialistisk Venstreparti)	2
Liberal Party (Venstre)	4
Total number of members:	53

Arendal kommunestyre 1979–1983
Party name (in Norwegian)	Number of representatives
Labour Party (Arbeiderpartiet)	18
Progress Party (Fremskrittspartiet)	1
Conservative Party (Høyre)	19
Christian Democratic Party (Kristelig Folkeparti)	8
Socialist Left Party (Sosialistisk Venstreparti)	1
Liberal Party (Venstre)	4
Joint list of the New People's Party (Nye Folkepartiet) and Centre Party (Senterpartiet)	2
Total number of members:	53

Arendal kommunestyre 1975–1979
Party name (in Norwegian)	Number of representatives
Labour Party (Arbeiderpartiet)	18
Conservative Party (Høyre)	16
Christian Democratic Party (Kristelig Folkeparti)	10
Socialist Left Party (Sosialistisk Venstreparti)	1
Liberal Party (Venstre)	2
Joint list of the New People's Party (Nye Folkepartiet) and Centre Party (Senterpartiet)	6
Total number of members:	53

Arendal kommunestyre 1971–1975
Party name (in Norwegian)	Number of representatives
Labour Party (Arbeiderpartiet)	23
Conservative Party (Høyre)	14
Christian Democratic Party (Kristelig Folkeparti)	7
Centre Party (Senterpartiet)	1
Liberal Party (Venstre)	7
Socialist common list (Venstresosialistiske felleslister)	1
Total number of members:	53

Arendal kommunestyre 1967–1971
Party name (in Norwegian)	Number of representatives
Labour Party (Arbeiderpartiet)	23
Conservative Party (Høyre)	14
Christian Democratic Party (Kristelig Folkeparti)	6
Socialist People's Party (Sosialistisk Folkeparti)	1
Liberal Party (Venstre)	9
Total number of members:	53

Arendal kommunestyre 1963–1967
Party name (in Norwegian)	Number of representatives
Labour Party (Arbeiderpartiet)	25
Conservative Party (Høyre)	15
Christian Democratic Party (Kristelig Folkeparti)	6
Liberal Party (Venstre)	7
Total number of members:	53

Arendal bystyre 1959–1963
Party name (in Norwegian)	Number of representatives
Labour Party (Arbeiderpartiet)	23
Conservative Party (Høyre)	16
Christian Democratic Party (Kristelig Folkeparti)	7
Liberal Party (Venstre)	7
Total number of members:	53

Arendal bystyre 1955–1959
Party name (in Norwegian)	Number of representatives
Labour Party (Arbeiderpartiet)	24
Conservative Party (Høyre)	15
Communist Party (Kommunistiske Parti)	1
Christian Democratic Party (Kristelig Folkeparti)	7
Liberal Party (Venstre)	6
Total number of members:	53

Arendal bystyre 1951–1955
Party name (in Norwegian)	Number of representatives
Labour Party (Arbeiderpartiet)	22
Conservative Party (Høyre)	14
Communist Party (Kommunistiske Parti)	1
Christian Democratic Party (Kristelig Folkeparti)	7
Liberal Party (Venstre)	8
Total number of members:	52

Arendal bystyre 1947–1951
Party name (in Norwegian)	Number of representatives
Labour Party (Arbeiderpartiet)	19
Conservative Party (Høyre)	16
Communist Party (Kommunistiske Parti)	3
Christian Democratic Party (Kristelig Folkeparti)	6
Liberal Party (Venstre)	8
Total number of members:	52

Arendal bystyre 1945–1947
Party name (in Norwegian)	Number of representatives
Labour Party (Arbeiderpartiet)	24
Conservative Party (Høyre)	12
Communist Party (Kommunistiske Parti)	3
Christian Democratic Party (Kristelig Folkeparti)	8
Joint list of the Liberal Party (Venstre) and the Radical People's Party (Radikale Folkepartiet)	5
Total number of members:	52

Arendal bystyre 1937–1941*
Party name (in Norwegian)	Number of representatives
Labour Party (Arbeiderpartiet)	19
Temperance Party (Avholdspartiet)	8
Conservative Party (Høyre)	19
Liberal Party (Venstre)	6
Total number of members:	52
Note: Due to the German occupation of Norway during World War II, no elections were held for new municipal councils until after the war ended in 1945.

Arendal bystyre 1934–1937
Party name (in Norwegian)	Number of representatives
Labour Party (Arbeiderpartiet)	18
Temperance Party (Avholdspartiet)	6
Conservative Party (Høyre)	19
Nasjonal Samling Party (Nasjonal Samling)	3
Liberal Party (Venstre)	6
Total number of members:	52

Arendal bystyre 1931–1934
Party name (in Norwegian)	Number of representatives
Labour Party (Arbeiderpartiet)	14
Temperance Party (Avholdspartiet)	7
Conservative Party (Høyre)	24
Communist Party (Kommunistiske Parti)	1
Liberal Party (Venstre)	6
Total number of members:	52

Arendal bystyre 1928–1931
Party name (in Norwegian)	Number of representatives
Labour Party (Arbeiderpartiet)	15
Temperance Party (Avholdspartiet)	11
Joint List(s) of Non-Socialist Parties (Borgerlige Felleslister)	26
Total number of members:	52

Arendal bystyre 1925–1928
Party name (in Norwegian)	Number of representatives
Labour Party (Arbeiderpartiet)	11
Temperance Party (Avholdspartiet)	12
Social Democratic Labour Party (Socialdemokratiske Arbeiderparti)	3
Joint list of the Conservative Party (Høyre) and the Free-minded Liberal Party (Frisinnede Venstre)	19
Local List(s) (Lokale lister)	7
Total number of members:	52

Arendal bystyre 1922–1925
Party name (in Norwegian)	Number of representatives
Labour Party (Arbeiderpartiet)	10
Temperance Party (Avholdspartiet)	13
Social Democratic Labour Party (Socialdemokratiske Arbeiderparti)	3
Joint list of the Conservative Party (Høyre) and the Free-minded Liberal Party (Frisinnede Venstre)	17
Joint List(s) of Non-Socialist Parties (Borgerlige Felleslister)	3
Local List(s) (Lokale lister)	6
Total number of members:	52

Arendal bystyre 1919–1922
Party name (in Norwegian)	Number of representatives
Labour Party (Arbeiderpartiet)	10
Temperance Party (Avholdspartiet)	18
Joint list of the Conservative Party (Høyre) and the Free-minded Liberal Party (Frisinnede Venstre)	16
Local List(s) (Lokale lister)	8
Total number of members:	52

=== Mayors ===
The mayor (Norwegian: ordfører) of Arendal Municipality is the political leader of the municipality and the chairperson of the municipal council. The following people have held this position:

- 1838–1861: Morten Smith Dedekam
- 1861–1861: Wilhelm Foss
- 1862–1862: Johannes Westergaard
- 1863–1870: Tollef Omholt
- 1871–1871: Anders D. Geelmuyden
- 1872–1878: Ole Schrøder (H)
- 1879–1879: Peter L. Lund
- 1880–1884: Ole Schrøder (H)
- 1885–1886: Ove S. Andersen
- 1887–1895: Thorvald Christian Christensen (H)
- 1896–1898: Claus Bomhoff Evensen
- 1899–1901: Johan Henrik Kintzell Frøstrup (H)
- 1902–1907: Axel Smith (H)
- 1908–1913: Hans Schrøder
- 1914–1916: Michael Blom Bakke
- 1917–1919: Josef Hammer
- 1920–1924: Ove Andersen (H)
- 1925–1925: Halvor Løvold (H)
- 1926–1931: Oscar Lundegaard
- 1932–1934: Nicolai B. Herlofson
- 1935–1940: Niels Sødring Barth
- 1941–1941: Konrad M. Havig
- 1941–1942: Sigurd Saxlund (NS)
- 1943–1944: Eystein Knutzon (NS)
- 1945–1945: Carl Hansen (NS)
- 1945–1945: Niels Sødring Barth
- 1946–1947: Ola Solberg (Ap)
- 1948–1967: Jens T. Thommesen (H)
- 1968–1971: Stian W. Erichsen (V)
- 1972–1987: Ørnulf G. Christensen (H)
- 1988–1991: Ivar Bollmann Pedersen (Ap)
- 1992–1995: Einar Livolden (Sp)
- 1996–1999: Sigurd Ledaal (H)
- 2000–2003: Alf Eivind Ljøstad (KrF)
- 2003–2011: Torill Rolstad Larsen (Ap)
- 2011–2015: Einar Halvorsen (H)
- 2015–present: Robert Cornels Nordli (Ap)

== Geography ==
The municipality is bordered to the southwest by Grimstad Municipality, to the northwest by Froland Municipality, to the northeast by Tvedestrand Municipality, and to the southeast by the Skaggerak. The lake Rore is located on the border with Grimstad Municipality along with the river Nidelva. The highest point in the municipality is the 268.61-metre (881.3 ft) tall mountain Høgsteinsheia, located on the border with Froland Municipality (and near the border with Grimstad Municipality).

Arendal is the geologic type locality of the mineral Babingtonite, which was first described from specimens discovered here in 1824.

The coastal municipality includes several populated islands such as Hisøy, Tromøya, Merdø, Flosterøya, and Tverrdalsøya as well as many unpopulated or sparsely populated islands such as Ærøya. The island of Merdø was a major export port in the 17th and 18th centuries and now has a museum, a kiosk, and several beaches. There is regular boat service from Arendal to the island every day during the summer season.

=== Climate ===
The municipality of Arendal is split into two climate zones: a temperate oceanic climate (Köppen: Cfb) along the coast and a humid continental climate (Köppen: Dfb) inland. Precipitation is abundant and spread out year-round, but peaks during autumn. While easterlies occasionally bring heavy, disruptive snowfall during winter, temperatures fluctuating around 0°C means that the snow is susceptible to melting. Summers are generally sunny and mild, with daytime temperatures between 19°C and 24°C.

Torungen Lighthouse is a maritime weather station located 3 kilometres (1.9 mi) into the open sea, and about 7 kilometres (4.3 mi) from the city of Arendal. Because of its maritime location, winters tend to be milder and summers cooler than on the mainland. The all-time low is from January 1942, and the all-time high is from June 1995.

Climate data for Torungen Lighthouse 1991-2020 (12 m, extremes 1877-2020)
Month	Jan	Feb	Mar	Apr	May	Jun	Jul	Aug	Sep	Oct	Nov	Dec	Year
Record high °C (°F)	12.2 (54.0)	15.8 (60.4)	20.5 (68.9)	20.9 (69.6)	24.6 (76.3)	29.2 (84.6)	28.7 (83.7)	29 (84)	26.4 (79.5)	20.3 (68.5)	16.3 (61.3)	13.4 (56.1)	29.2 (84.6)
Mean daily maximum °C (°F)	3.7 (38.7)	3.3 (37.9)	5.2 (41.4)	8.4 (47.1)	13.1 (55.6)	17 (63)	19.3 (66.7)	19.2 (66.6)	15.9 (60.6)	11.3 (52.3)	7.4 (45.3)	4.7 (40.5)	10.7 (51.3)
Daily mean °C (°F)	1.6 (34.9)	1.1 (34.0)	2.6 (36.7)	5.8 (42.4)	10.4 (50.7)	14.2 (57.6)	16.6 (61.9)	16.6 (61.9)	13.5 (56.3)	9.2 (48.6)	5.4 (41.7)	2.6 (36.7)	8.3 (47.0)
Mean daily minimum °C (°F)	−0.3 (31.5)	−0.8 (30.6)	0.6 (33.1)	3.7 (38.7)	8 (46)	11.9 (53.4)	14.2 (57.6)	14.2 (57.6)	11.4 (52.5)	7.2 (45.0)	3.6 (38.5)	0.7 (33.3)	6.2 (43.2)
Record low °C (°F)	−21.6 (−6.9)	−20.9 (−5.6)	−18.1 (−0.6)	−10.2 (13.6)	−2.3 (27.9)	2.6 (36.7)	7.5 (45.5)	6.1 (43.0)	1.9 (35.4)	−6.8 (19.8)	−12 (10)	−17.4 (0.7)	−21.6 (−6.9)
Average precipitation mm (inches)	86.5 (3.41)	60.6 (2.39)	56.5 (2.22)	48.1 (1.89)	59.5 (2.34)	68.2 (2.69)	61 (2.4)	87.9 (3.46)	88.2 (3.47)	116.9 (4.60)	113.1 (4.45)	93.2 (3.67)	939.7 (36.99)
Average precipitation days (≥ 1.0 mm)	13	9	8	8	8	9	9	11	11	13	13	13	125
Source 1: Norwegian Meteorological Institute (extremes)
Source 2: NOAA

Climate data for Arendal 1961-1990
Month	Jan	Feb	Mar	Apr	May	Jun	Jul	Aug	Sep	Oct	Nov	Dec	Year
Mean daily maximum °C (°F)	1.8 (35.2)	1.4 (34.5)	3.4 (38.1)	7.7 (45.9)	13.0 (55.4)	16.8 (62.2)	19.2 (66.6)	19.0 (66.2)	15.3 (59.5)	11.0 (51.8)	6.7 (44.1)	3.8 (38.8)	9.9 (49.8)
Daily mean °C (°F)	−0.4 (31.3)	−1.0 (30.2)	0.9 (33.6)	4.7 (40.5)	9.6 (49.3)	13.3 (55.9)	15.9 (60.6)	15.8 (60.4)	12.5 (54.5)	8.7 (47.7)	4.5 (40.1)	1.7 (35.1)	7.2 (45.0)
Mean daily minimum °C (°F)	−2.5 (27.5)	−3.4 (25.9)	−1.6 (29.1)	1.7 (35.1)	6.3 (43.3)	9.9 (49.8)	12.6 (54.7)	12.6 (54.7)	9.8 (49.6)	6.4 (43.5)	2.3 (36.1)	−0.3 (31.5)	4.5 (40.1)
Average precipitation mm (inches)	85 (3.3)	60 (2.4)	67 (2.6)	49 (1.9)	61 (2.4)	64 (2.5)	78 (3.1)	105 (4.1)	107 (4.2)	122 (4.8)	120 (4.7)	92 (3.6)	1,010 (39.6)
Source: Climate-Data.org

== Economy ==
In 2018 the service sector had 82% of the jobs in the municipality.

A battery factory (for car batteries and ship batteries), has been owned by Morrow (company); the company went bankrupt in Q2 2026;the factory operated for one-and-a-half year (as of Q1 2026)..

== Attractions ==
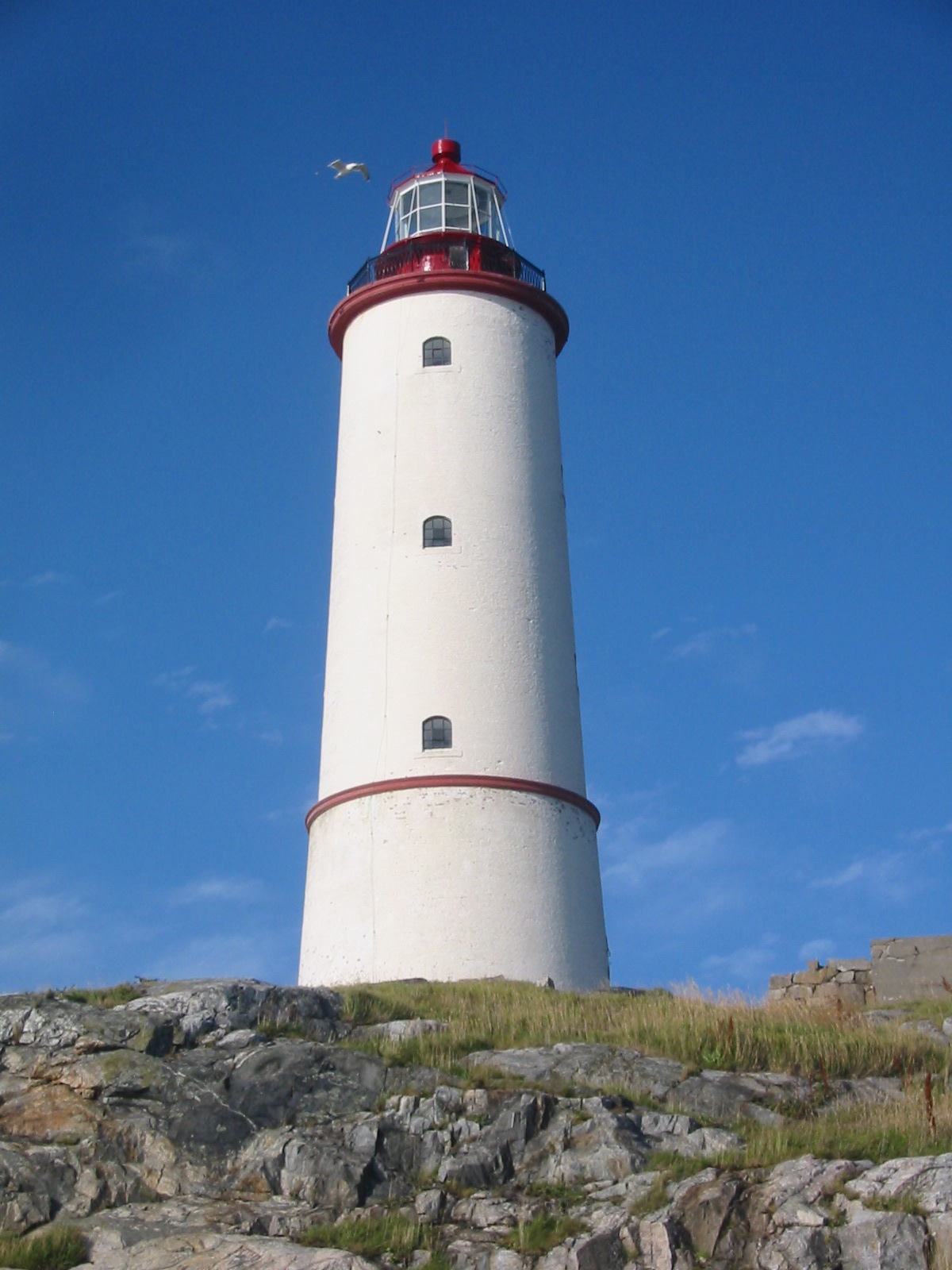
Lille Torungen Lighthouse

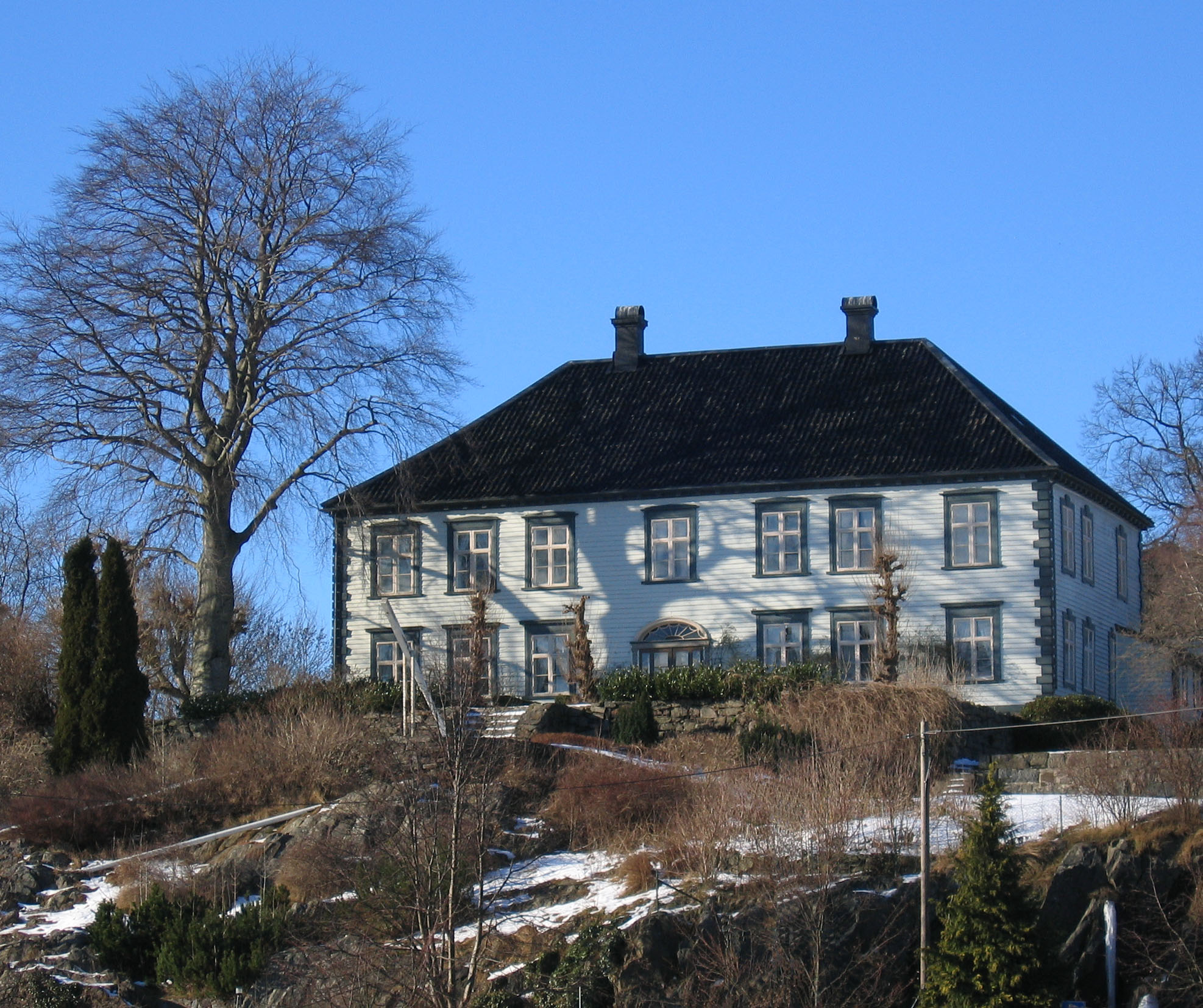
Strømsbo gård

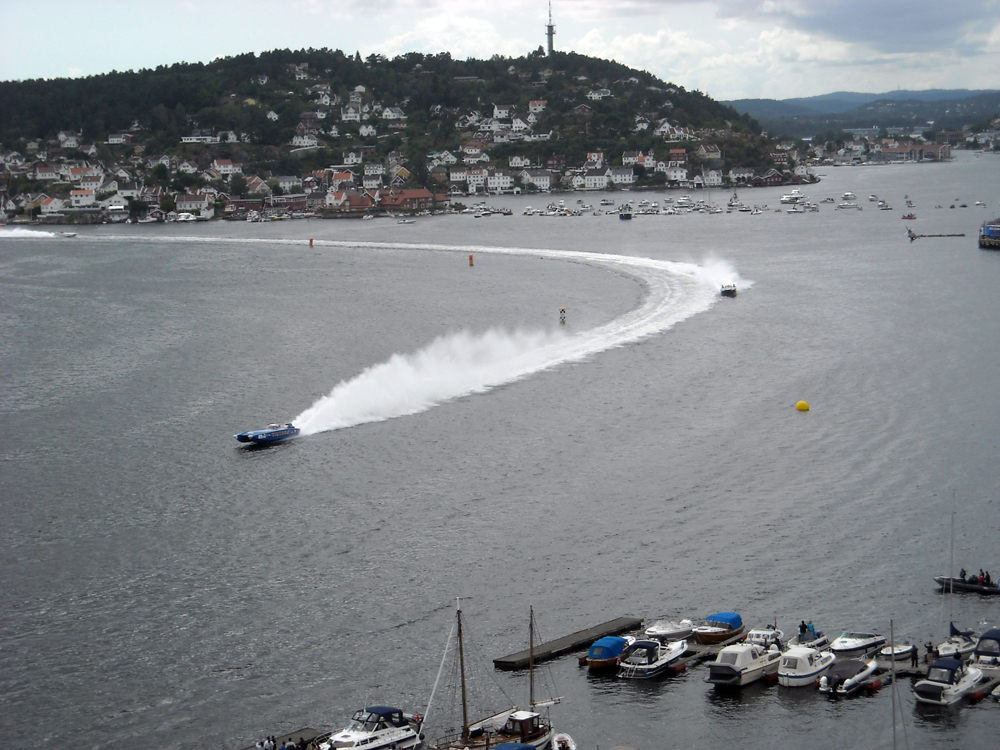
The annual Norwegian Grand Prix for F1 Powerboat Racing is held at Arendal

=== Townscape ===
In the middle of the town centre of Arendal is an area with wooden houses dating back to the 17th century. This area is called Tyholmen, and is what is left of buildings from before the 19th century. The inner harbour of Arendal is called "Pollen", where the fish market, pubs, and restaurants are located. Trinity Church dominates the skyline of this area.

Arendal has grown from a traditional sleepy summer-town (with culture activities just in the summer) to a more "all year" city. The building of the new library and the combined city hall/concert house has greatly improved culture life.

=== Lighthouses ===
The Store Torungen Lighthouse is located on the island of Store Torungen outside Arendal. It was constructed in 1844 and electrified in 1914. It is 34.3 metres (113 ft) high and contains a 2nd order lens. It is reachable by a 55-minute boat trip from the town centre. The lighthouse is still in use.

The Lille Torungen Lighthouse is situated on the small island of Lille Torungen outside Arendal. The lighthouse is 28.9 metres (95 ft) high. Lille Torungen and Store Torungen were constructed as twin lighthouses, and both are located in the Arendal shipping lane.

The Sandvigodden Lighthouse is also located in Arendal.

=== Strømsbo gård ===
Strømsbo gård is a manor house on a historic farm located west of the center of Arendal. The manor dates from the 1760s. From 1804 the manor and farm were owned by members of the Herlofson family. Peter Herlofson took over the farm and gave the building its present form. In 1883, Axel Herlofsen (1845–1910) built the Strømsbo steam sawmill at the head of Strømsbubukt. Nicolai Benjamin Herlofson (1876–1945), former mayor of Arendal, was born and raised at Strømsbo.

=== Music festivals ===
- Canal Street is Arendals yearly jazz and blues festival during the summer. It has been arranged since 1996, at that time by the name of Arendal Jazz and Blues Festival. The popularity of the arrangement has been steadily increasing.
- From 2007 until 2014, the Hove Festival was located on the island of Tromøy just outside Arendal town. It was the largest festival scene in Norway the debut year, and it has an audience capacity of up to 25,000.

== Transport ==
The European route E18 highway is a major transportation route through Arendal heading to Oslo in the northeast and Kristiansand to the southwest. Other main roads in Arendal include the Norwegian County Road 407, Norwegian County Road 408, and Norwegian County Road 410. The local railway line Arendalsbanen runs to Nelaug where it connects with the main Sørlandsbanen railway line, which runs between the cities of Oslo and Stavanger.

The Setesdal Bilruter (on behalf of public transit authority AKT) provides bus connections throughout the Arendal area, the Setesdal region including Froland, as well as to the neighboring towns of Grimstad, Lillesand and Kristiansand, and a handful of their suburbs and outlying villages. A few more destinations can be reached with other bus operators (namely Agder Buss, Nettbuss, Konkurrenten.no, and Lavprisekspressen), including places such as Risør, Tvedestrand, Oslo, and Stavanger. There is also a bus connection to Kristiansand Airport operated by Agder Flyekspress and Nettbuss express (the latter on behalf of Flybussen.no). Ferries run between the city center and the islands of Hisøy and Tromøya. Arendal does also have an airport, Arendal Airport, Gullknapp, although it does not have any commercial airlines regularly stopping here.

== Healthcare ==
The municipality organises general practitioner services, such as the primary doctor scheme, accident and emergency departments, physiotherapy, public health centers and school medical services, home nursing care, midwifery services and nursing homes or living arrangements for around-the-clock nursing and care. Sørlandet Hospital has a visiting location in Arendal and offers specialist health services in somatics, psychiatry and addiction treatment.

== Twin towns – sister cities ==
Arendal has sister city agreements with the following places:

City	Region	Country
Árborg	(Iceland) Southern Region	Iceland
Kalmar	Kalmar County	Sweden
Mwanza	(Tanzania) Mwanza Region	Tanzania
Portland	Maine	United States
Rēzekne	Latgalia	Latvia
Savonlinna	South Savo	Finland
Silkeborg	Central Denmark Region	Denmark

== In fiction ==
The area around Arendal was the location for the 1997 Lille Lørdag series "Min drømmeserie" starring Harald Eia and Bård Tufte Johansen. The 2013 Disney film Frozen is set in a fictional kingdom named Arendelle, which is derived from and loosely based on the city of Arendal.

== Notable people ==
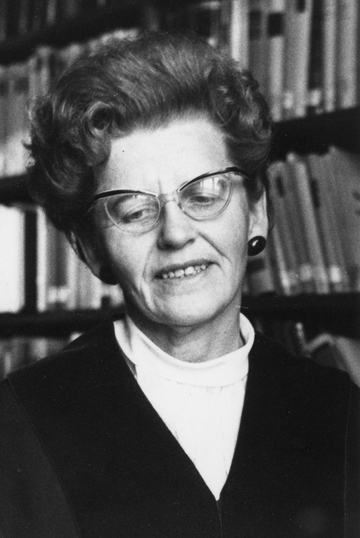
Lilly Bølviken, 1971

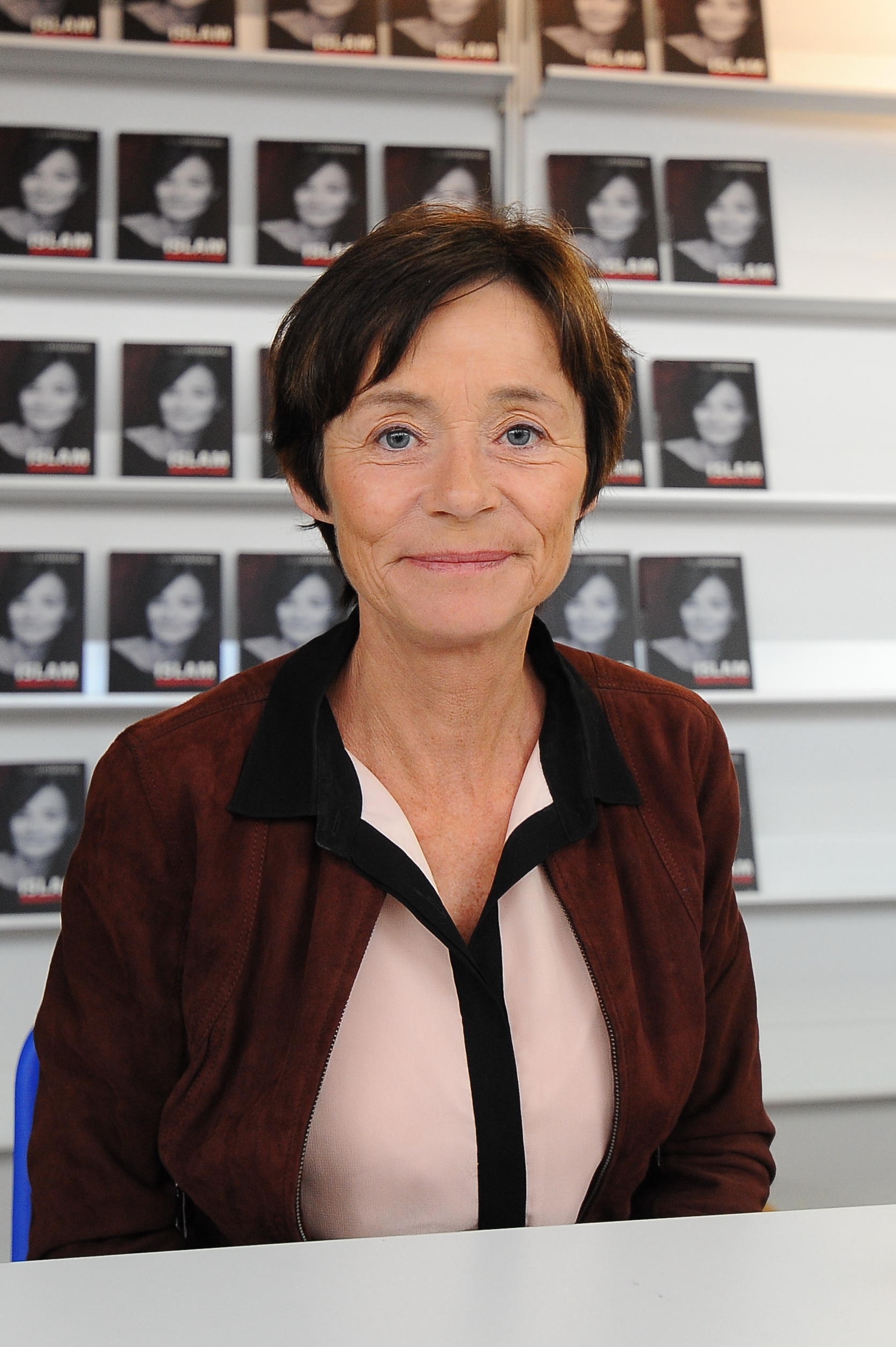
Hege Storhaug, 2017

=== Public service and public thinking ===
- Jens Munk (1579–1628), a Dano-Norwegian navigator and explorer who searched for the Northwest Passage to India
- Andreas Frederik Krieger (1817–1893), a politician, government minister, and supreme court judge
- Anton Christian Houen (1823–1894), a teacher, philanthropist, and businessman
- Yngvar Nielsen (1843–1916), a historian, politician, and geographer
- Sam Eyde (1866–1940), an engineer and industrialist who founded Norsk Hydro
- Magnus Olsen (1878–1963), a philologist who specialized in Old Norse studies
- Lucy Pedersen, a climate change activist
- Alf Dannevig (1886–1960), a marine biologist and mayor of Hisøy from 1948 to 1960
- Sigrid Stray (1893–1978), a barrister and proponent of women's rights
- Sigurd Anderson (1904–1990), the 19th Governor of South Dakota (1951 to 1955)
- Ebba Lodden (1913–1997), a civil servant and politician who was the first female county governor in Norway
- Lilly Bølviken (1914–2011), a judge, women's rights advocate, and first woman Norwegian Supreme Court Justice from 1968 to 1984
- Aksel Lydersen (1919–1995), an engineer and professor of chemical engineering
- Svenn Stray (1922–2012), a politician who served twice as Foreign Minister of Norway
- Magnhild Lien (born ca.1955), a mathematician specializing in knot theory
- Grete Faremo (born 1955), a politician, lawyer, and business leader
- Hege Storhaug (born 1962), a political and human rights activist, journalist, and author

=== Arts ===
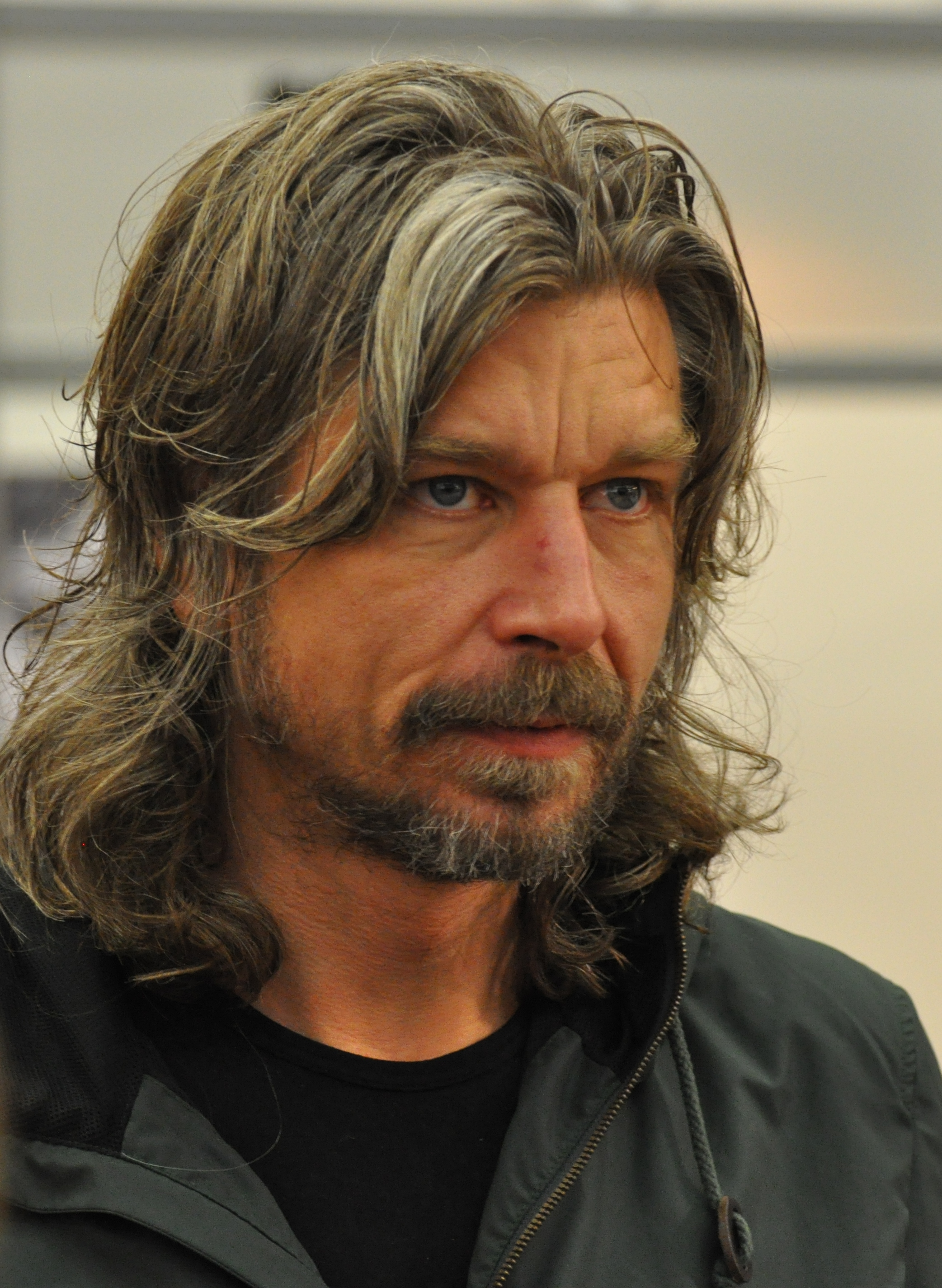
Karl Ove Knausgård, 2011

- Ole Nilsen Weierholt (1718–1792), a wood carver and pattern maker for ironworks
- Sophie Dedekam (1820–1894), a composer and diarist
- Louis Moe (1857–1945), a painter, illustrator, and writer
- Tillie Baldwin (1888–1958), an American rodeo contestant and performer in Wild West shows
- Trygve Thorsen (1892–1965), a sculptor of busts and reliefs
- Bård Torstensen (born 1961), a guitarist for rap metal band Clawfinger
- Karl Ove Knausgård (born 1968), a writer who was raised on Tromøya in Arendal
- Finn Iunker (born 1969), a playwright
- Kristin Danielsen (born 1972), a dancer, choreographer, and cultural administrator
- Øyvind Sauvik (born 1976), a hip hop musician

=== Sport ===
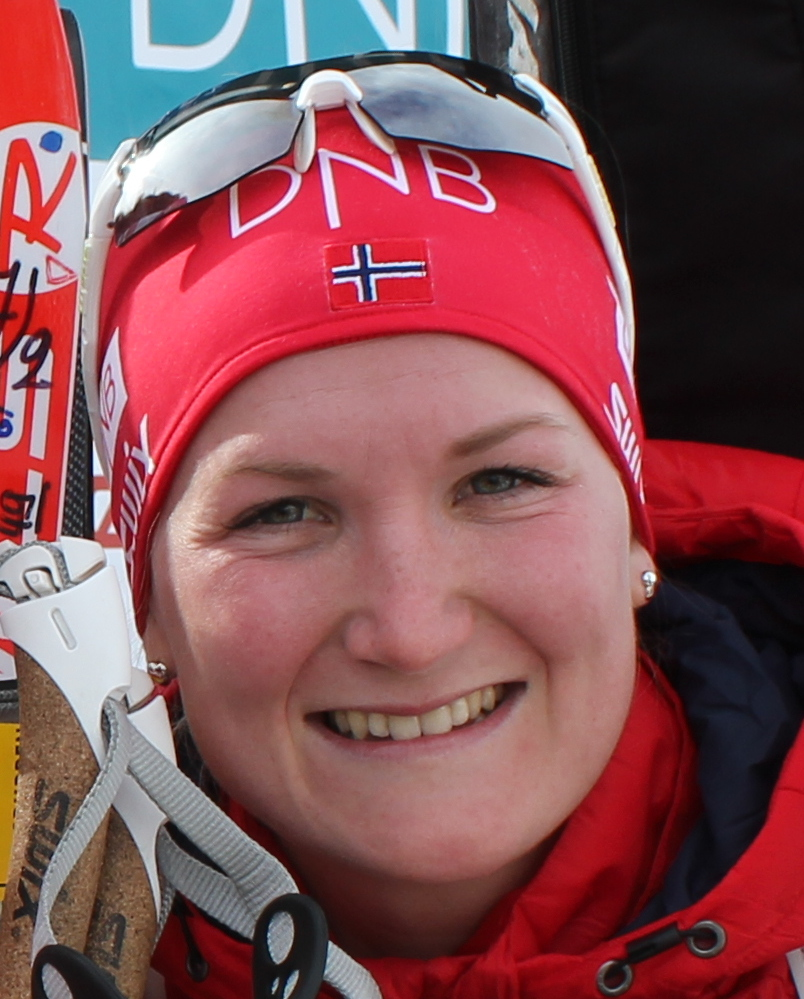
Marte Olsbu, 2016

- Dan Evensen (born 1974), a mixed martial arts fighter
- Monica Knudsen (born 1975), a former footballer with 87 caps with Norway women and team gold medallist at the 2000 Summer Olympics
- Øystein Grødum (born 1977), a speedskater who competed in the 2006 Winter Olympics
- Sisters Annette Bjelkevik (born 1978) and Hedvig Bjelkevik (born 1981), speed skaters who competed at the 2006 Winter Olympics
- Twins Roger Risholt and Kai Risholt (born 1979), retired footballers
- Marit Fiane Christensen (born 1980), a footballer with 86 caps with the Norwegian women's national football team
- Glenn Andersen (born 1980), a retired footballer with 437 club caps
- Jan Gunnar Solli (born 1981), a footballer with 350 club caps and 40 for the Norwegian men's national football team
- Håvard Vad Petersson (born 1984), a curler who was a team silver medallist at the 2010 Winter Olympics
- Marte Olsbu Røiseland (born 1990), a biathlete and silver medallist at the 2018 Winter Olympics
