= Nidelva (Agder) =

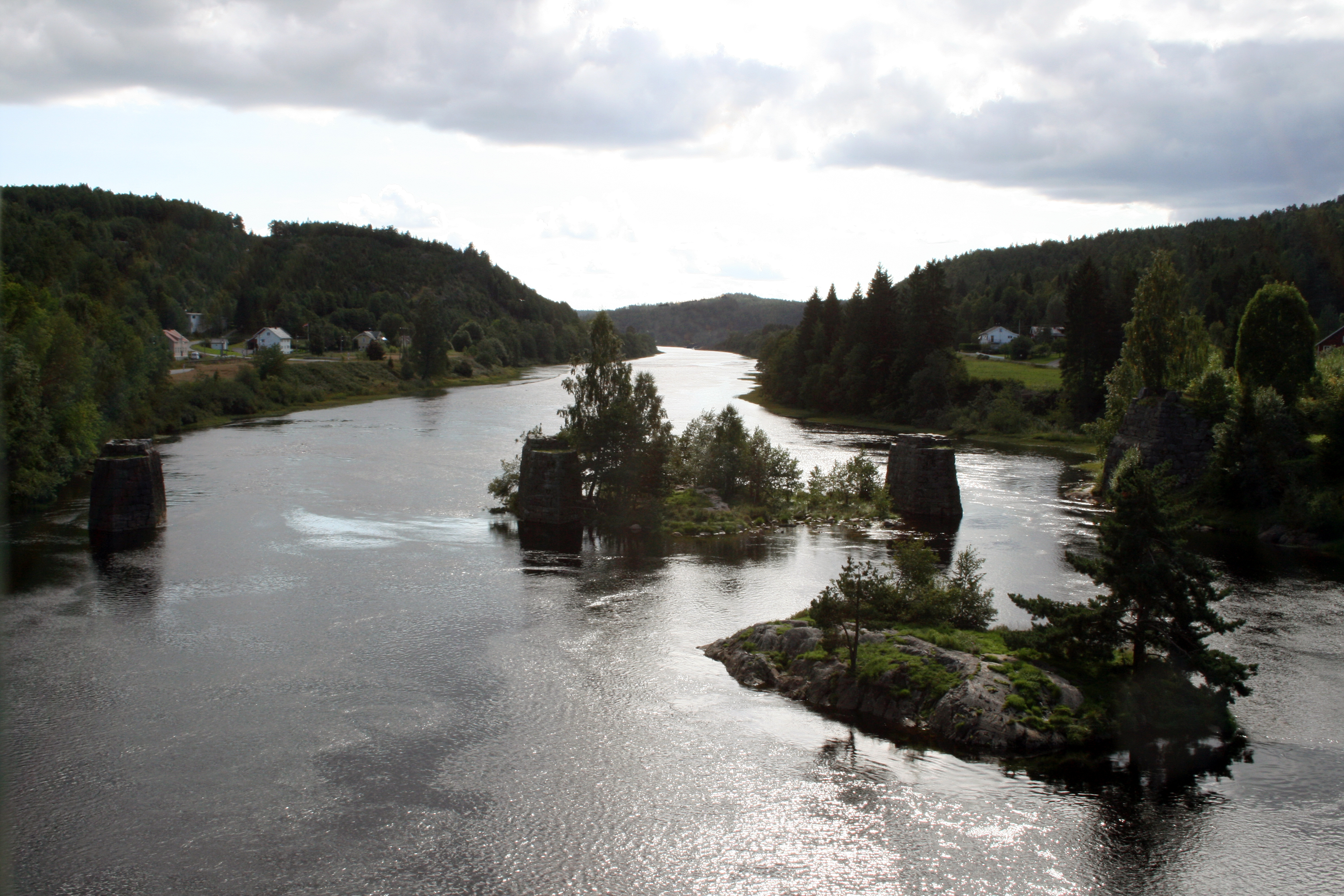
- Nidelva near Blakstad in Froland Municipality

Location
- Country: Norway
- Counties: Agder, Telemark
- Municipalities: Grimstad Municipality; Arendal Municipality; Froland Municipality; Åmli Municipality; Nissedal Municipality

Physical characteristics
- Source: Confluence of Nisserelva and Fyresdalsåna rivers
  - location: Haugsjåsund, Nissedal, Telemark
  - coordinates: 58.9406°N 08.5011°E
  - elevation: 160 metres (520 ft)
- Mouth: Skaggerak
  - location: Arendal, Agder
  - coordinates: 58.4349°N 08.7137°E
  - elevation: 0 metres (0 ft)
- Length: 221.7 km (137.8 mi)
- Basin size: 4,011 km^{2} (1,549 sq mi)
- Discharge
  - location: Rykene, Arendal Municipality
  - average: 114.4 m^{3}/s (4,040 cu ft/s)

Basin features
- River system: Arendalvassdraget
- Tributaries
  - left: Karlsåna, Katteråsåna
  - right: Blekevja, Gjøv, Sigridneskilen, Songeelva, Trevann, Rore
- Waterbodies: Nelaug
- Waterfalls: Kastefossen

Nidelva is the main river in the Arendal drainage basin in Agder county, Norway. The 221.7-kilometre (137.8 mi) long river begins at the confluence of two rivers: Nisserelva and Fyreselv. The confluence is located by the village of Haugsjåsund in Nissedal Municipality in southern Telemark county. The river flows south into the Skagerrak at the city of Arendal in Agder county. The watershed covers 4,011 square kilometres (1,549 sq mi) and has an average waterflow of 114.4 cubic metres per second (4,040 cu ft/s) at Rykene near the mouth. The highest waterflow ever recorded on the river was 1,200 cubic metres per second (42,000 cu ft/s) in the autumn of 1987.

== Watercourse ==
The river flows through Nissedal Municipality in Telemark county briefly before entering Agder county. It then flows through Åmli Municipality where the river Gjøv joins the Nidelva. The large lake Nelaug is a man-made lake along the river that is used for power generation. It continues through Froland Municipality and then Arendal Municipality. For a while, the river forms the border between Grimstad Municipality and Arendal Municipality. The river empties into the Skaggerak just northeast of Rykene in the town of Arendal between the mainland and the island of Hisøya.

There are sixteen hydro-electric power stations are built along the river, making this one of Norway's most controlled drainage systems. The largest on the river are at Rygene in Grimstad Municipality, Evenstad in Froland Municipality, and Jørundland in Åmli Municipality. Salmon can be found from the mouth to as far as 22 kilometres (14 mi) up the river, where the Evenstad power station is located, effectively blocking their path further upstream.

== Name ==
The name of the river possibly comes from the Old Norse word niðr which means "murmuring" or "humming". It may also come from the Latin word nitere. The name of the river also may lend itself to several other local names along the river such as Nisser, Nedenes, and Nelaug.

== Media gallery ==
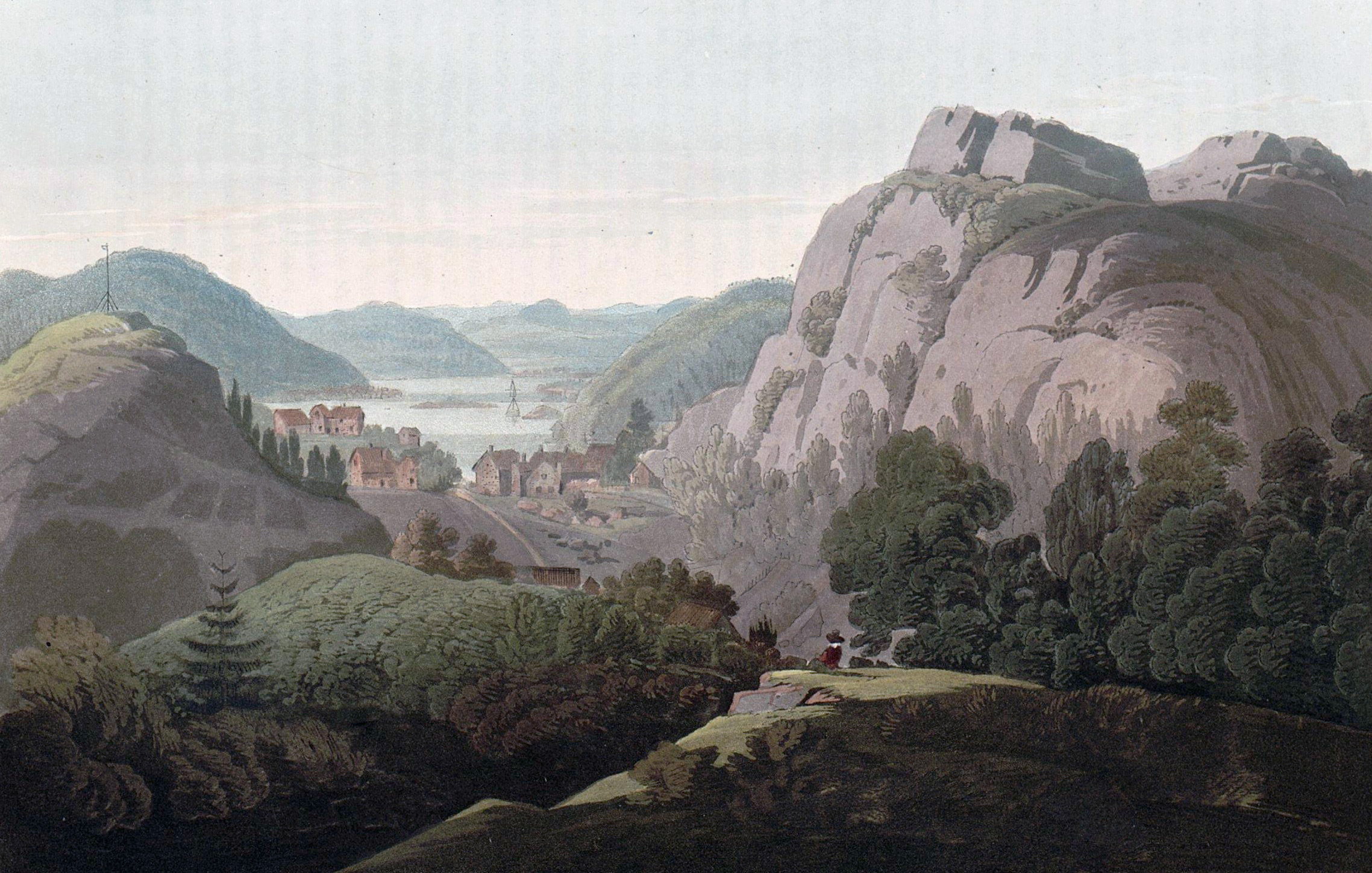
View of the River Nid
Credit: John William Edy

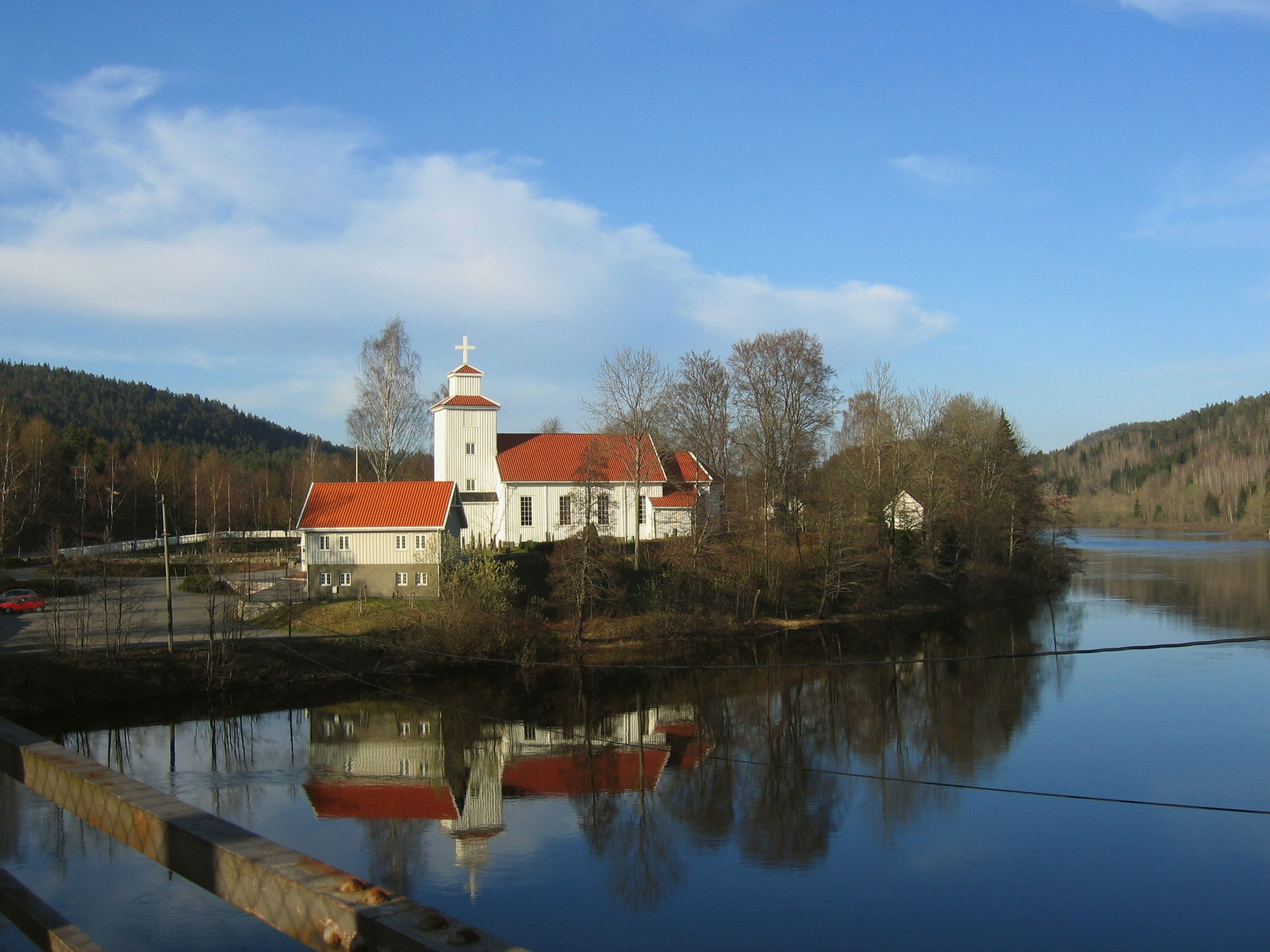
Froland Church located along the river Nidelva

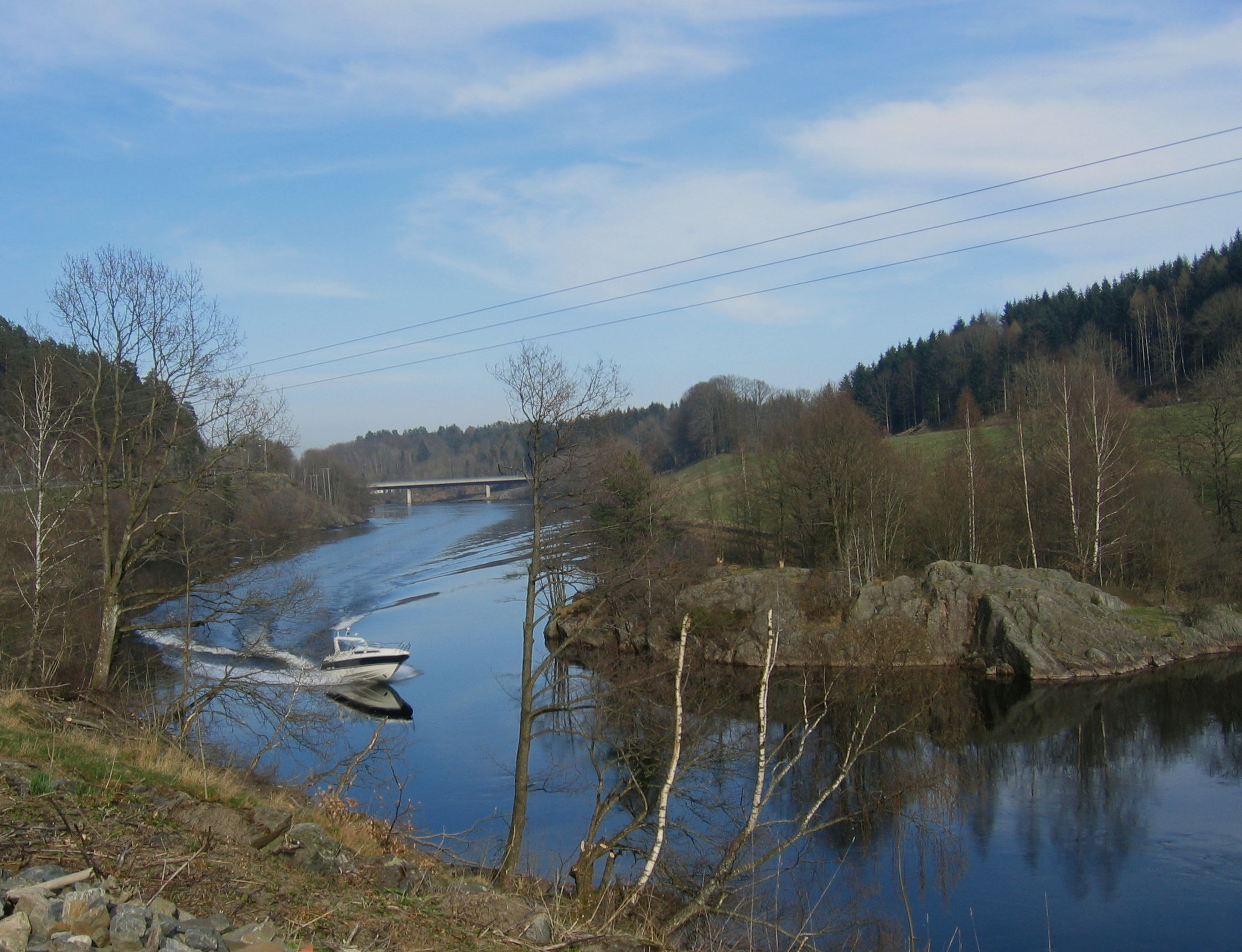
View of the river in Arendal

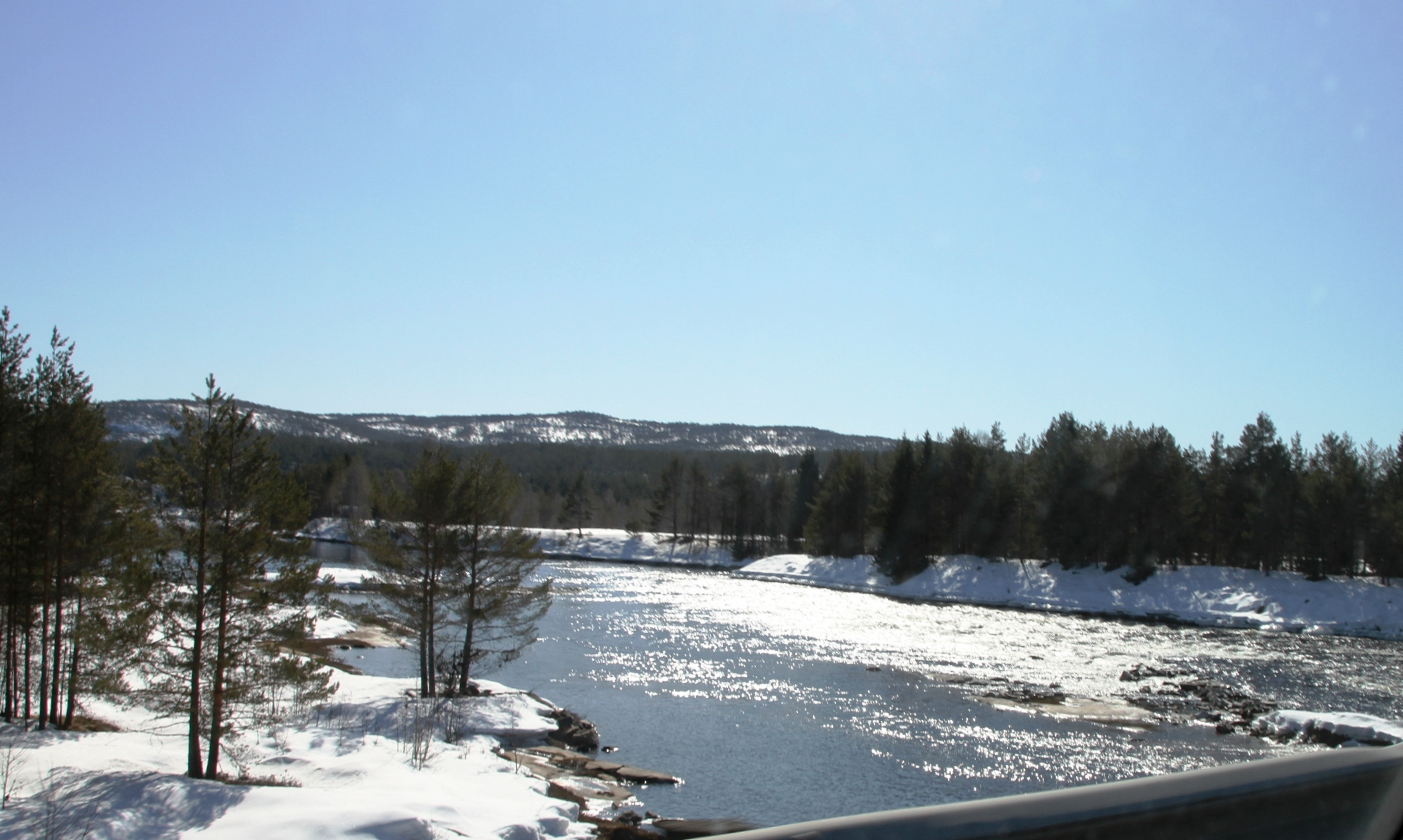
View of the river near Gjermundsnes in Åmli

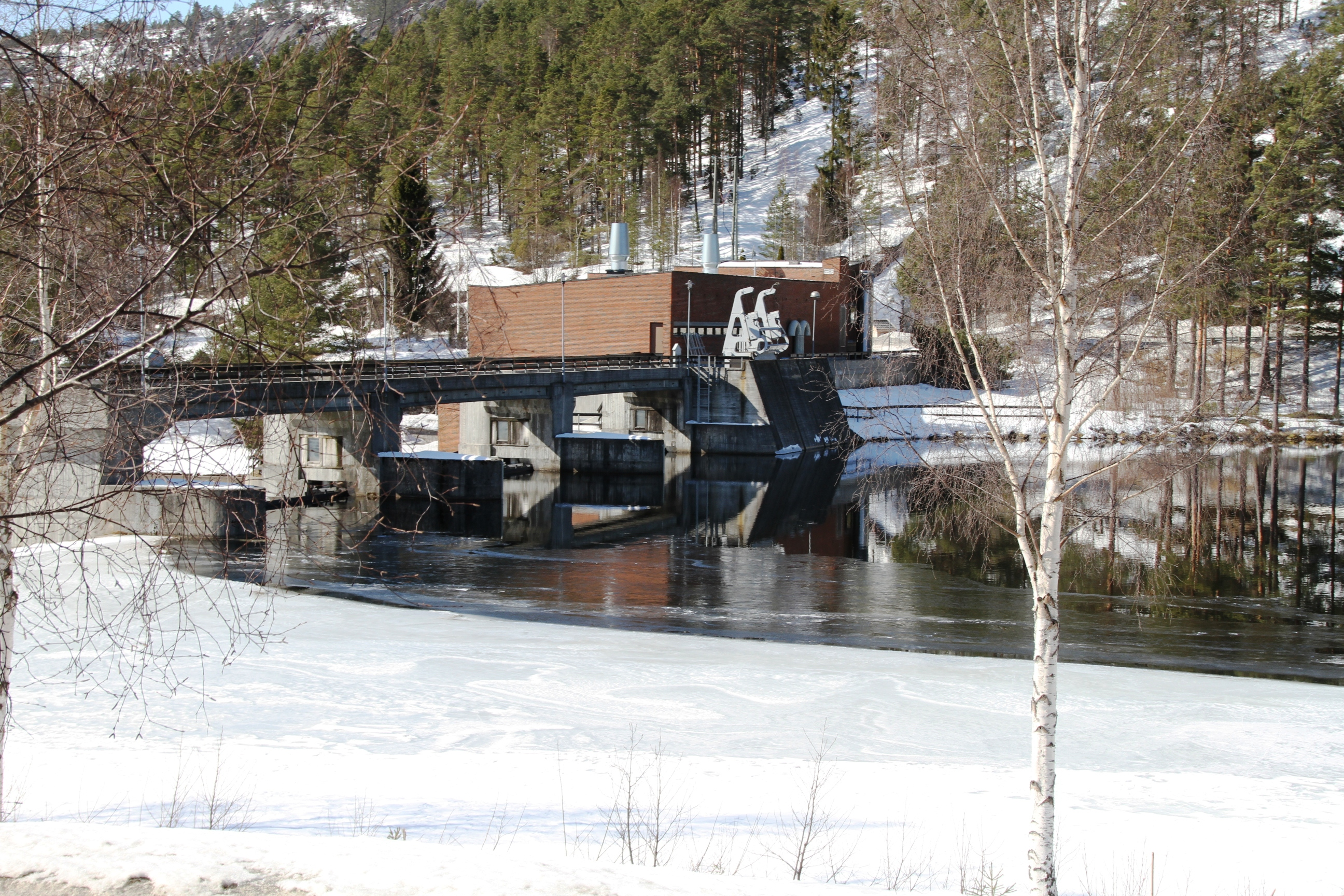
Åmfossen power station along the river in Åmli

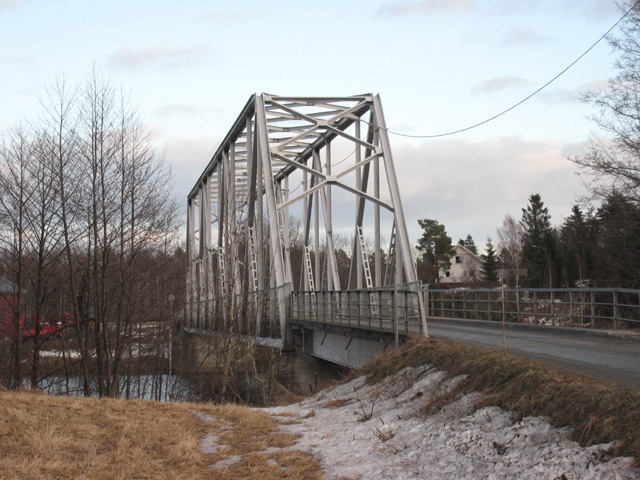
Furre bridge over the river in Froland

== See also ==
- List of rivers in Norway
