= Kolbjørn =

Kolbjørn is a given name. Notable people with the given name include:

- Kolbjørn Almlid (born 1945), Norwegian businessman and politician
- Kolbjørn Buøen (1895–1975), Norwegian actor
- Kolbjørn Fjeld (1901–1978), Norwegian librarian and publisher
- Kolbjørn Hauge (1926–2007), Norwegian schoolteacher and non-fiction writer
- Kolbjørn Kvam (1865–1933), Norwegian sports shooter
- Kolbjørn Lyslo (born 1975), Norwegian musician
- Kolbjørn Skaare (1931–2017), Norwegian numismatist
- Kolbjørn Stordrange (1924–2004), Norwegian politician
- Kolbjørn Varmann (1904–1980), Norwegian priest and politician

== Ferries ==
- Kolbjørn (company), a shipping company from Arendal, Norway.
- SF Kolbjørn (1893–1940)
- MF Kolbjørn II (1915–1980)
- MF Kolbjørn III (1980–)

== See also ==
- Kolbjørnsen
