= Kolbjørn (company) =

Norwegian shipping company

Actieselskabet Kolbjørn
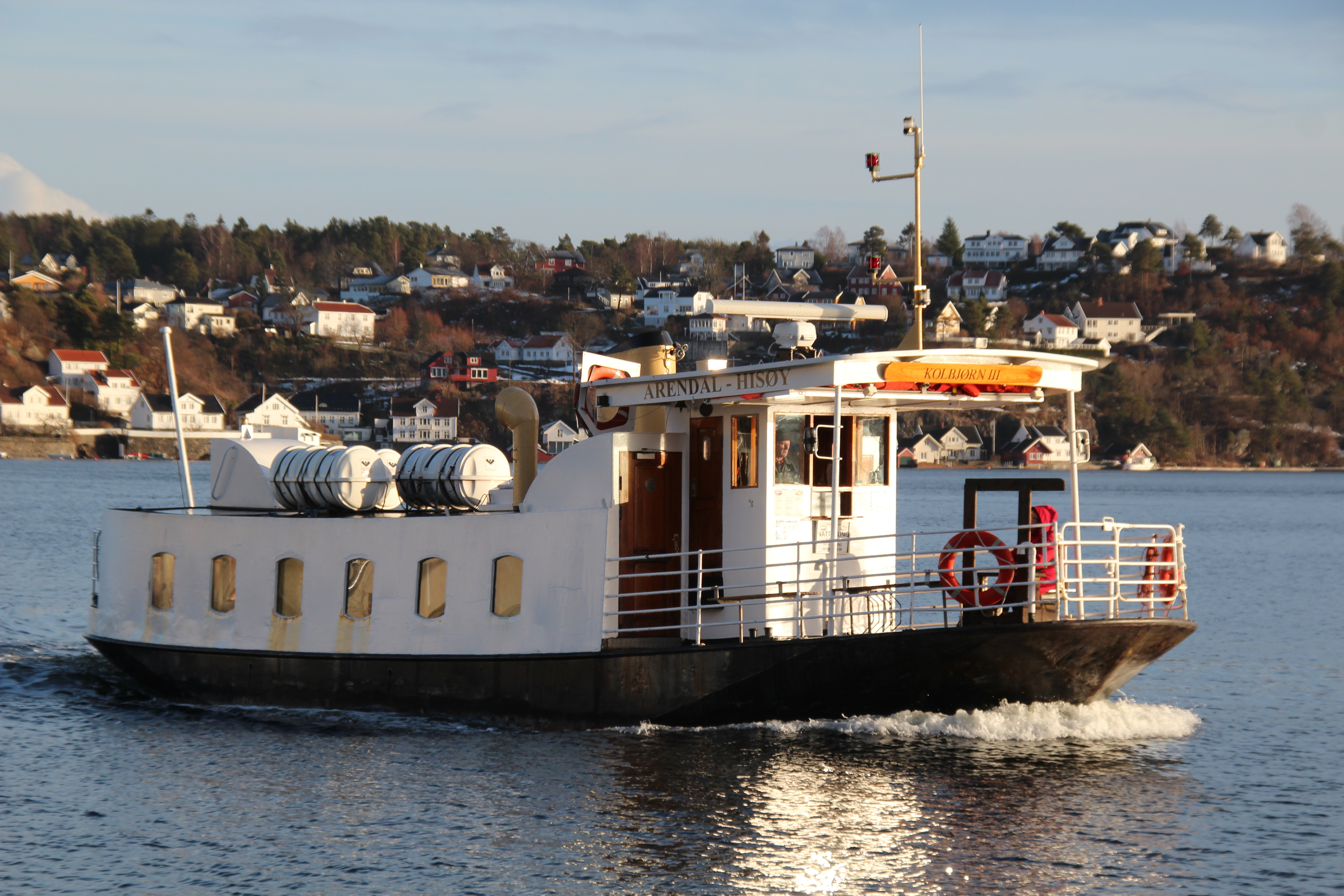
- MF Kolbjørn III
- Type: Private
- Industry: Ferry
- Founded: 2 February 1893; 133 years ago
- Headquarters: Arendal, Norway
- Website: mfkolbjoern.no

Actieselskabet Kolbjørn is a shipping company based in Arendal Municipality in Agder county, Norway. It operates MF Kolbjørn III between Kolbjørnsvik on the island of Hisøy and Tyholmen in downtown Arendal, with some services also stopping at Svinodden, Gulsmedengen and Norodden.

The company was founded on 2 February 1893, and by the end of the year had taken delivery of SF Colbjørn. It operated on the route until 1915, when it was replaced by SF (later MF) Kobjørn II. The third and final ship, Kolbjørn III, was delivered in 1980 as a near replica of Kolbjørn II.

== Service ==
Kolbjørn operates a ferry service across the harbor basin in Arendal. It runs from Tyholmen on the Arendal side, via Norodden and then to Kolbjørnsvik. From there is returns to Tyholmen. During rush hours, it extens the service to Svinodden, to serve the head office of Assuranceforeningen Gard, and to Guldsmedengen to serve APL. The ferry operates every 20 minutes.

== History ==
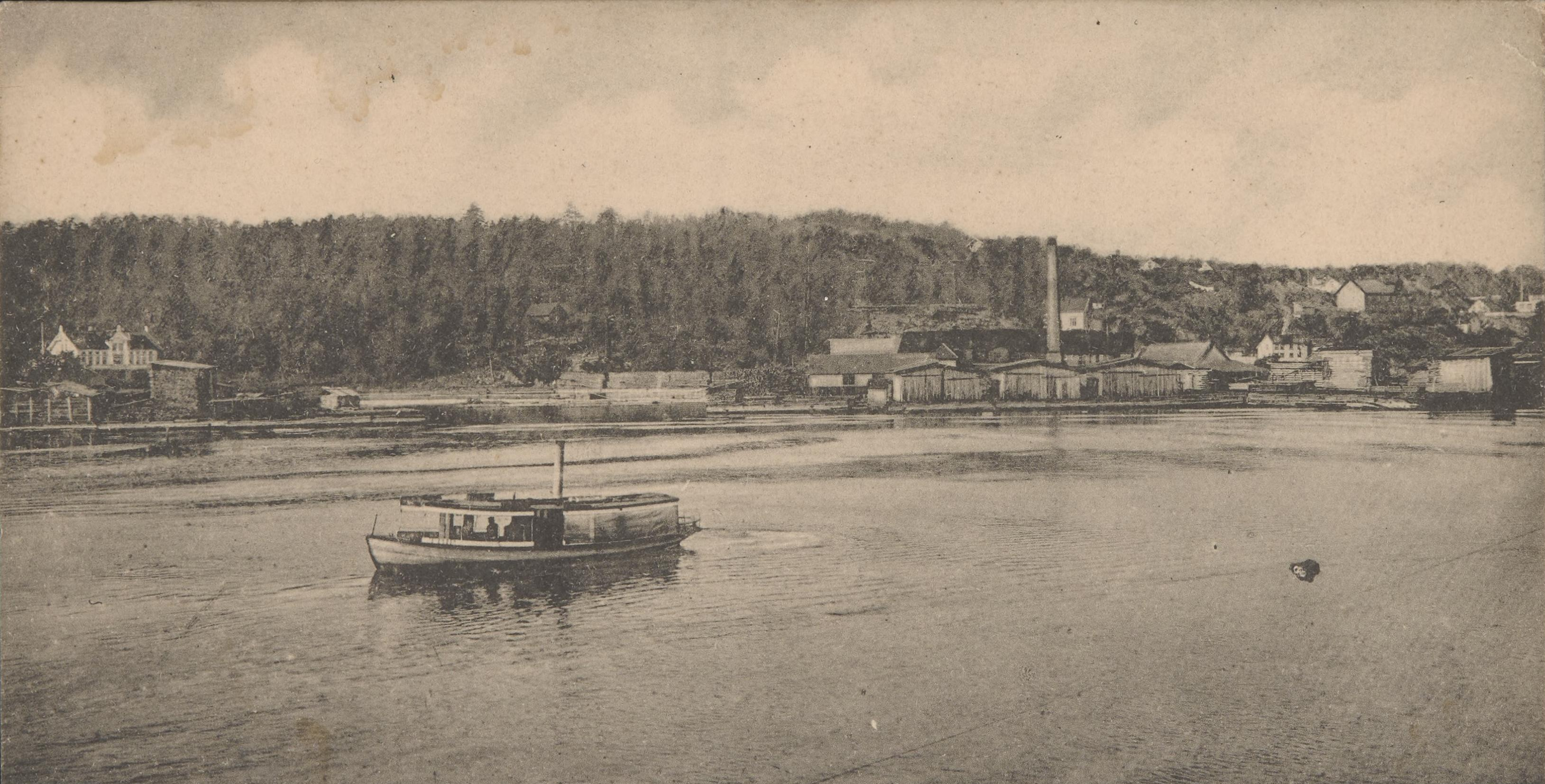
SF Colbjørn

Traditionally, crossing of the harbor basin in Arendal was carried out on a more or less ad-hoc basis by private people offering rides in their rowboats. Kolbjørn was founded on 2 February 1893 at Nøkternhdskaféen, a coffee house in Arendal. Its goal was to establish a scheduled ferry service across the harbor basin, between the island of Hisøy and the mainland. Alfrede Henrik Møller was elected as the company's first chairman, a position he would hold until being replaced by Christian Chistensen Flageborg around 1900.

A new ferry, SS Colbjørn, was ordered from Arendal Mekaniske Verksted on 22 February 1893. The Colbjørn had a capacity for 51 passengers, in addition to a skipper and machinist. She was delivered in the fall, costing eight thousand kroner. She initially operated with a 15-minute headway, but this quickly proved to be too ambitious. Tickets were based on tokes, which could be bought in a general store, and also offered discounts for regular customers.

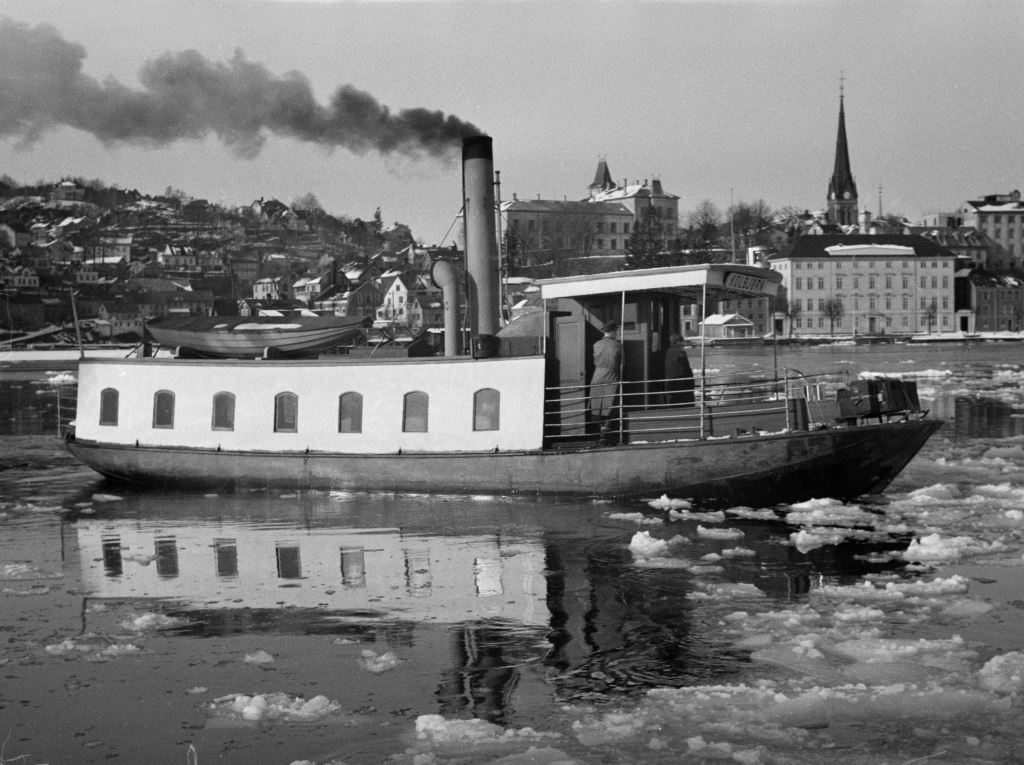
SF Kolbjørn II in 1947

In a large town meeting in 1915, there was large number of complaints from the traveling public. People were discontent with irregularities in service, safety, comfort and ticket prices. The discontent, and the realization that SS Kolbjørn could not meet contemporary standards, resulted in the ordering of a new ferry, SS Kolbjørn II, from Pusnes Mekansiske Verksted. Costing 18 thousand kroner, she was delivered in 1915, and the first ship ended up on the lake of Snåsavatnet.

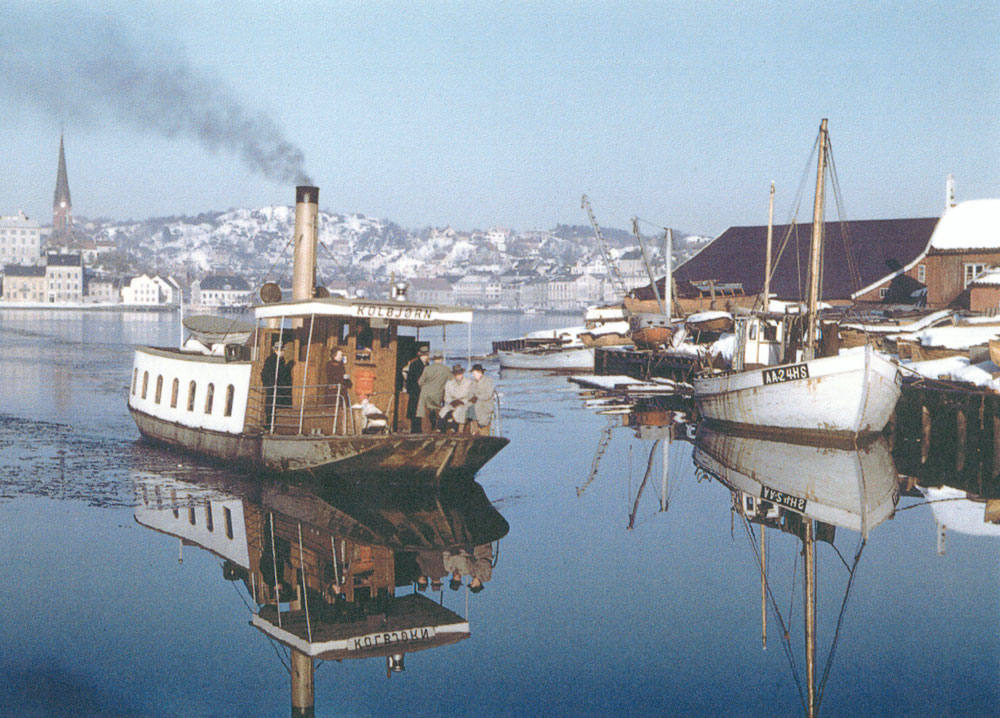
SF Kolbjørn II approaching Kolbjørnsvik in 1949

Electric lights were installed on the ship in 1928. During early 1940s, lack of coal meant that the ship operated with wood instead, and the service was cut to two round trips per hour. In 1954, the ship's steam engine was replaced with a combustion engine. This allowed the ship to be crewed with only a skipper, eliminating the need for a machinist. This engine was replaced twice, in 1963 and 1974.

The maritime authorities removed Kolbjørn II's passenger certificate in 1979. Their main concern was the structural ingegrity of the hull, and particularly that the welding seams could break during icy conditions. As a stop-gap measure, MF Tromøy II was put into the Hisøy route, in addition to its regular services to Tromøya.

An extraordinary annual meeting on 13 December 1979 decided to order a new ship, MF Kolbjørn III, from Lindstøls Skips- og Båtbyggeri in Risør. The new ship was to be built so close a replica of the old one as possible. Kolbjørn II was therefore sailed up to Risør. Construction started in January 1980 and was concluded in May. No drafts were made. Instead, each component was copied onto a template and then a new component based on it. The motor was transferred, as was the passenger bench.

The company was unable to finance the new ferry. New shares for 67 thousand kroner were issued, but most of the funding of 850 thousand kroner was paid for by Hisøy Municipality and Den norske Creditbank. However, after only five years the motor was replaced, giving a fuel saving of thirty percent.

A cooperation with Tromøy Båtruter, which runs operates MF Tromøy II, was started in 1982. In the evening, the two ferry companies had cooperated with one ferry operating both routes, and alternating between MF Kolbjørn III and MF Tromøy II every other week.

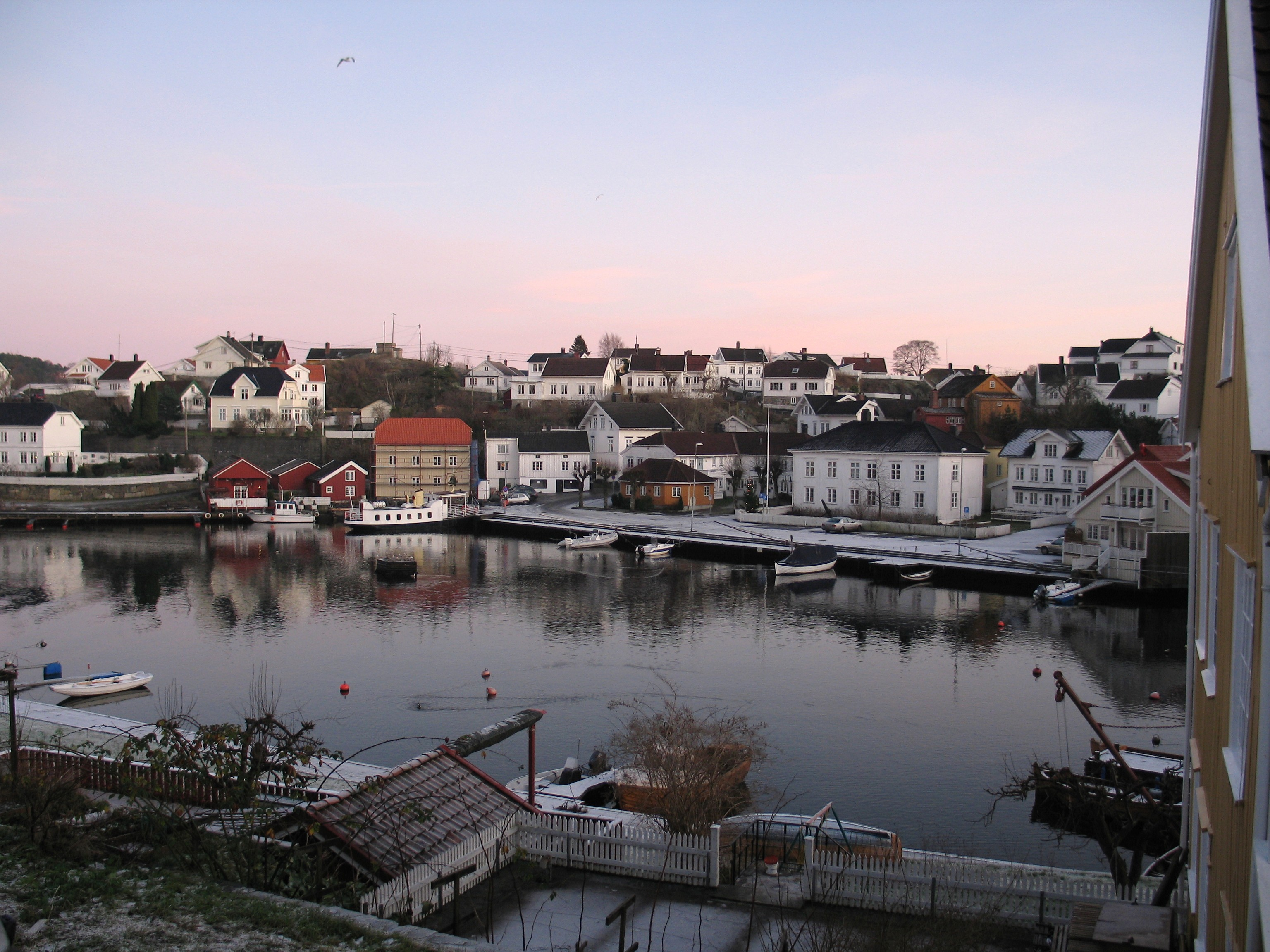
MF Kolbjørn III at dock in Kolbjørnsvik

Aust-Agder County Municipality introduced a subsidy to Kolbjørn from 1982, which was in effect payment for the transport of school children. This subsidy was removed in 1987, as the county wanted the pupils to instead use ATS's bus service. Kolbjørn introduced a month pass at half rate, and roughtly half the pupils continued to use the ferry service. For some pupils the added time of driving around was significant.

Aust-Agder Trafikkselskap (ATS) was created in 1986, when several bus operators in Aust-Agder merged. Tromøy Båtruter became part of the merged company. They almost immediately proposed removing the evening ferry services. ATS was interested in Kolbjørn also joining the merged company, but nothing came of those plans. Hisøy Municipality stopped subsidizing the company

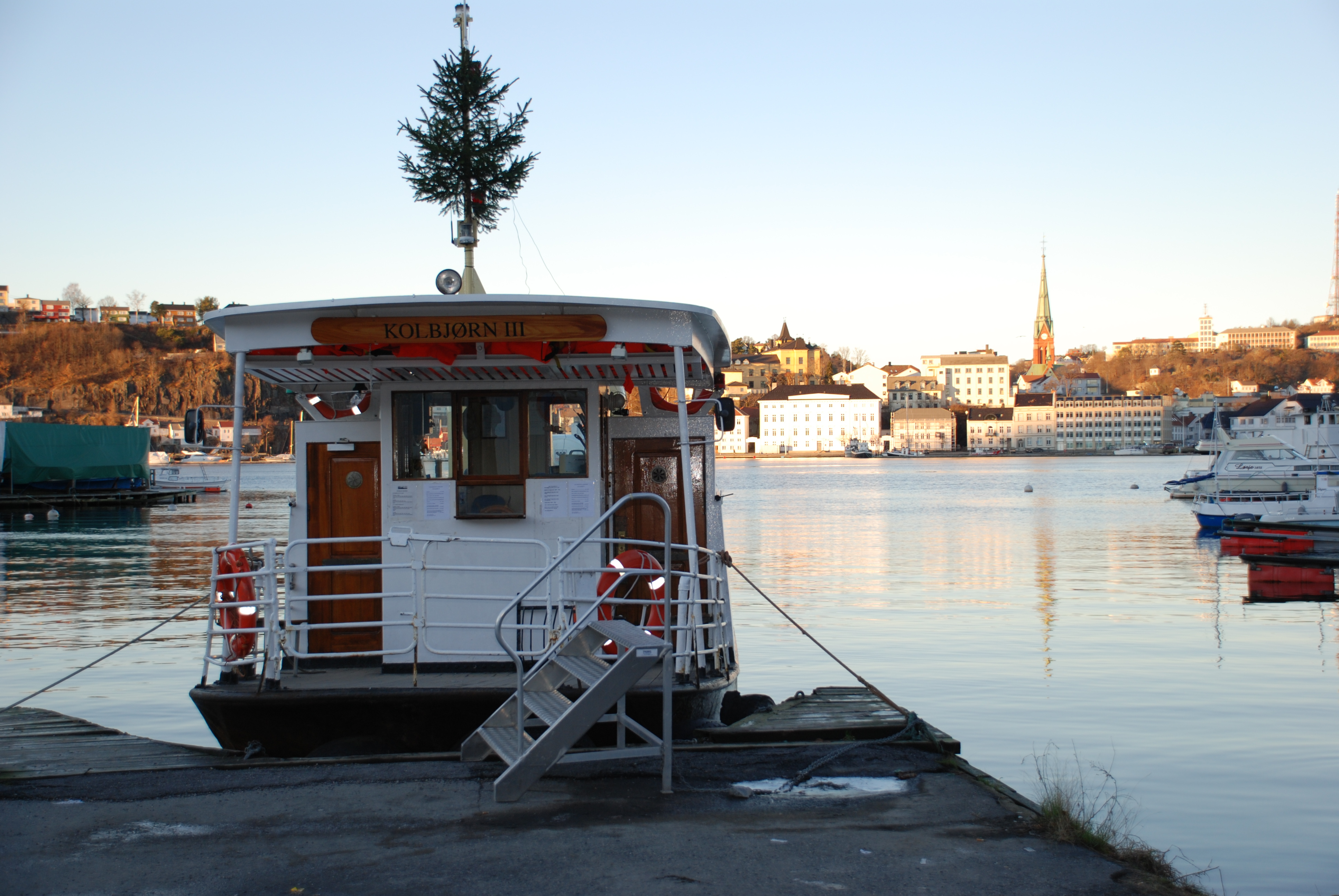
MF Kolbjørn III at dock in Kolbjørnsvik

Instead of paying dividens, the company had a tradition of organizing a dinner party for the shareholders in conjunction with the annual meeting. The formal part of the annual meeting was done in fifteen minutes, ajourned, and then the formal dinner could start. This dinner was traditionally reserved for men only. In 1991, female shareholder Bjørg Bøe attempted to sign up for the dinner. Although allowed to attend the annual meeting, she was escorted out of the premises after it concluded. The company's chairman stated that it was a tradition that the dinner was for men only, and saw no reason to change this. The issue was resolved the following year, by the dinner party being taken over by a newly established organization, independent of Kolbjørn.

From 2017, passengers under 30 with month passes from Agder Kollektivtransport could take the ferry included in their passes. However, regulations tied to the European Economic Area have made it impossible to introduce as similar system for adults. As of 2023, the annual subsidy paid for by Agder County Municipality in 1.25 million kroner.

== Organization ==
Actieselskabet Kolbjørn is organized as an aksjeselskap, and its shares are widely held by 600 people. No-one owns more than 38 shares. The company functions as a de facto non-profit. For instance, the board functions as the company's administration, and does not receive compensation. The company has not paid dividends since 1954.
