= MF Kolbjørn III =

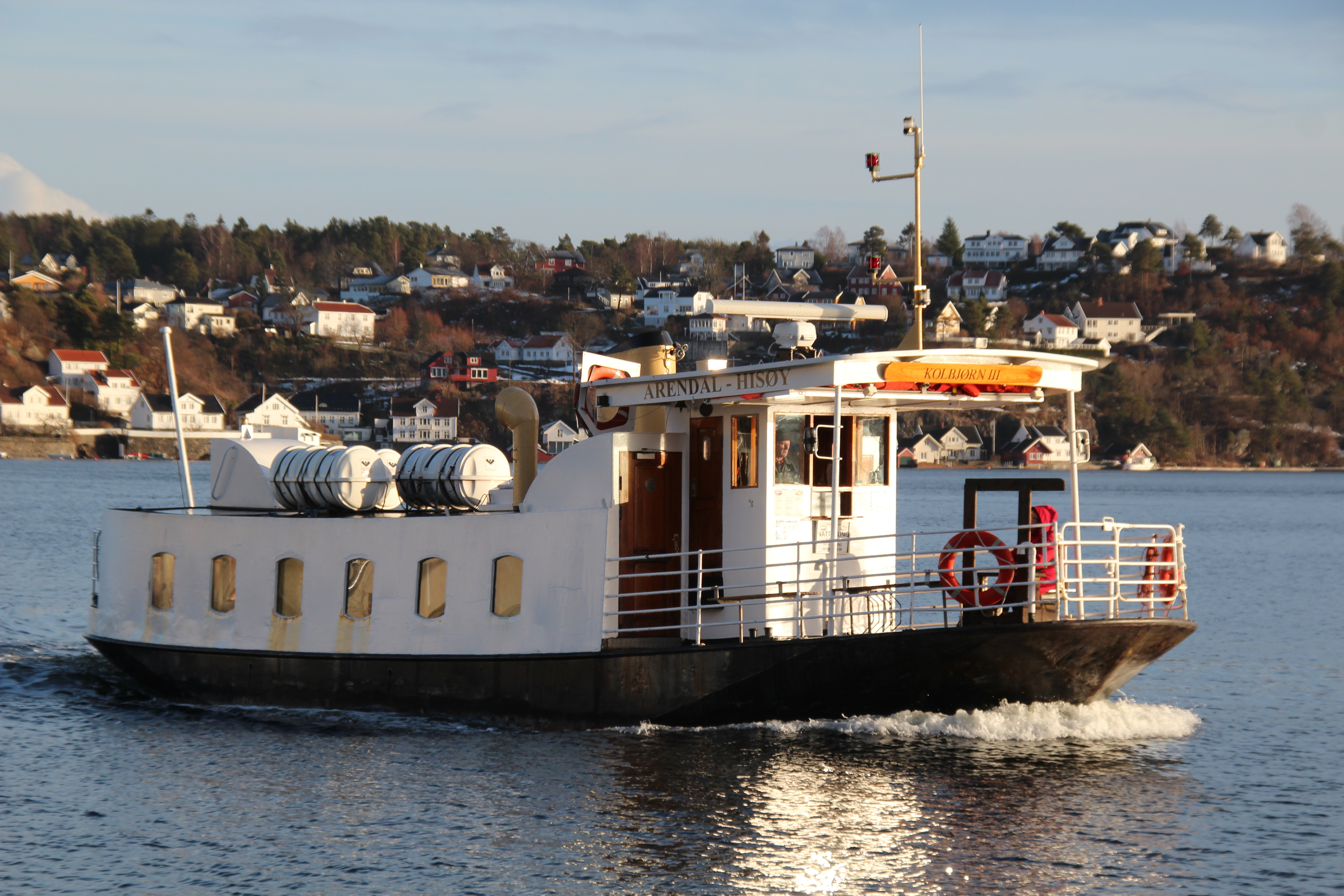

History
- Name: MF Kolbjørn II
- Namesake: Kolbjørnsvik
- Owner: Kolbjørn
- Port of registry: Arendal
- Route: Kolbjørnsvik–Arendal
- Builder: Lindstøls Skips- og Båtbyggeri
- Cost: NOK 850,000
- Laid down: January 1980
- Completed: May 1980

General characteristics
- Type: Merchant ship
- Tonnage: 39 GRT / 17 NRT
- Length: 14.6 m (48 ft)
- Beam: 3.9 m (13 ft)
- Draught: 2.0 m (6 ft 7 in)

MF Kolbjørn III is a passenger ferry which operates in the harbor basin of Arendal Municipality in Agder, Norway. The ship is owned and operated by the eponymous shipping company Kolbjørn. The ferry route connects Hisøy with downtown Arendal, with additional stops. Every other weekend it also runs the ferry service to Tromøya.

The vessel was built by Lindstøls Skips- og Båtbyggeri in 1980 as a replacement for and a nearly exact replica of MF Kolbjørn II. She inherited the former ships' motor, but needed to have a new one fitted in 1985.

== Specifications ==
Kolbjørn II is a wooden-hull passenger ferry with a registered capacity of 76 passengers. She is 14.6 meters (48 ft) long, had a beam of 3.9 meters (13 ft) and a draght of 2.0 meters (6 ft 7 in). This gives her her a register tonnage of 39 gross and 17 net.

== History ==
'Kolbjørn III is the third ship operated by Kolbjørn on the route between Hisøy and Arendal. Already in 1951 there had been discussions of a replacement for Kolbjørn II, but instead it was decided to rebuid her from a steamship to a motor ship. By 1979, Kolbjørn II had lost its passenger certificate. Their main concern was the structural ingegrity of the hull, and particularly that the welding seams could break during icy conditions. A new ship would be needed if the service was to continue.

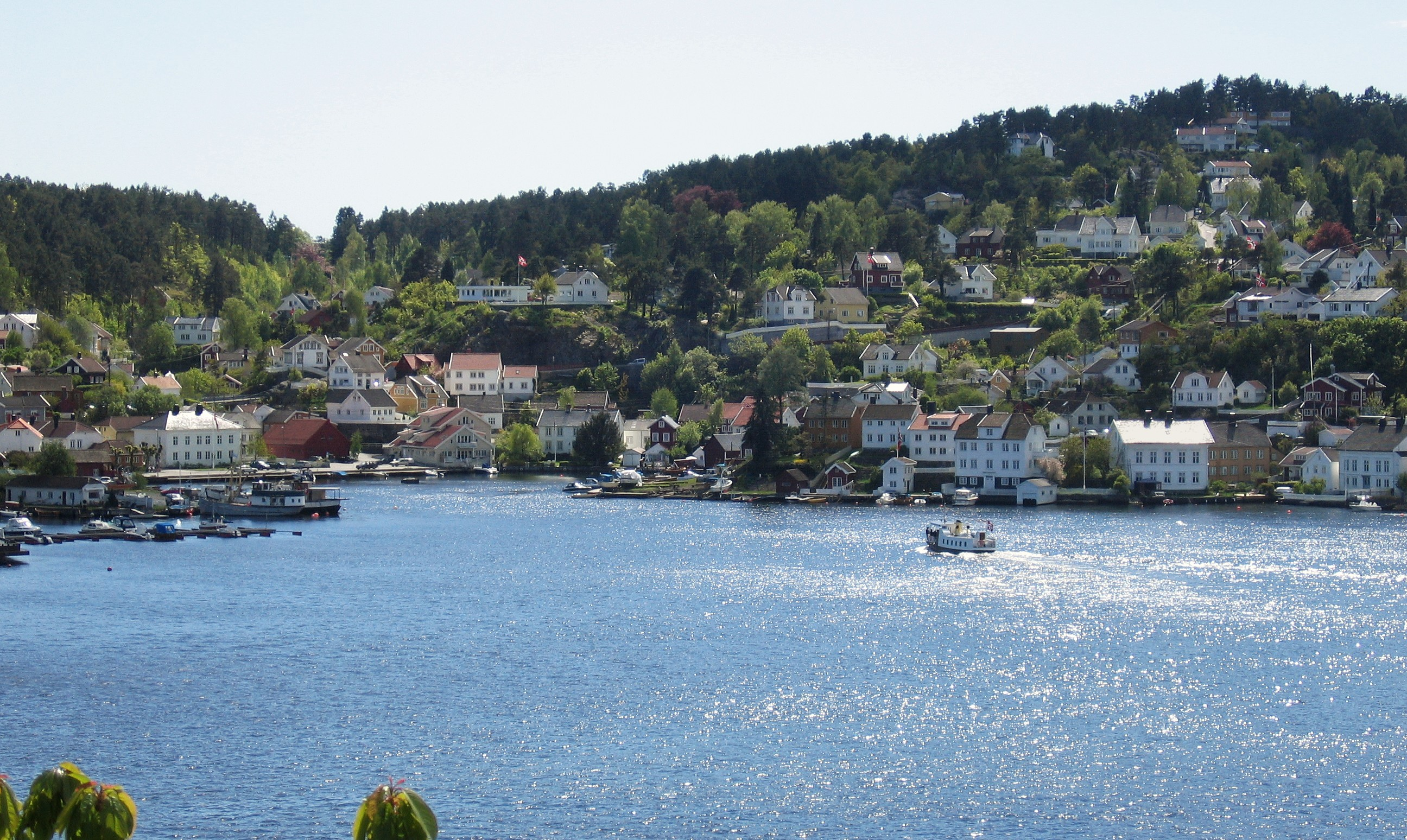
Kolbjørn II crossing to Kolbjørnsvik

An extraordinary annual meeting on 13 December 1979 decided to order a new ship, MF Kolbjørn III, from Lindstøls Skips- og Båtbyggeri in Risør. The new ship was to be built so close a replica of the old one as possible. Kolbjørn II was therefore sailed up to Risør. Construction started in January 1980 and was concluded in May. No drafts were made. Instead, each component was copied onto a template and then a new component based on it. The motor was transferred, as was the passenger bench. She sailed down from Risør to Arendal on 24 May 1980. She was christened by Anne-Marie Hedberg upon arrival in Arendal.

The company was unable to finance the new ferry by itself. New shares for 67 thousand kroner were issued, but most of the funding of 850 thousand kroner was paid for by Hisøy Municipality and Den norske Creditbank. However, after only five years the motor was replaced, giving a fuel saving of thirty percent.

Kolbjørn III operates a triangular route from Kolbjørnsvik to Tyholmen, then to Norodden and then to Kolbjørnsvik. The headway is 20 minutes. From 1982, an agreement was made with Tromøy Båtruter, that Kolbjørn III would every other weekend operate both the Hisøy and the Tromøy service.Since 2023, two more stops were added: Svinodden, to serve the head office of Assuranceforeningen Gard, and to Guldsmedengen, to serve APL.
