= Hisøy =

Hisøy may refer to:

== Places ==
- Hisøy (island), an island in Arendal Municipality in Agder county, Norway
- Hisøy Church, an church in Arendal Municipality in Agder county, Norway
- Hisøy Municipality, a former municipality in the old Aust-Agder county, Norway

== Other ==
- Hisøy IL, a sports club based in Arendal Municipality in Agder county, Norway
