= MF Kolbjørn II =

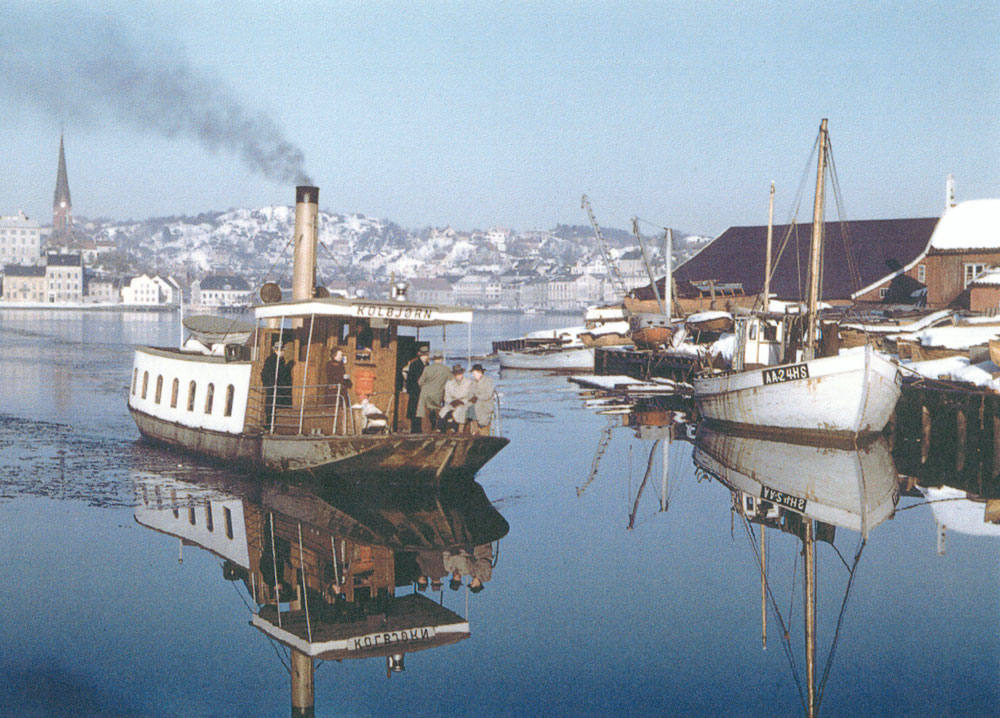
- SF Kolbjørn approaching Kolbjørnsvik in 1949

History
- Name: SF Kolbjørn (1915–54); MF Kolbjørn (1954–80)
- Namesake: Kolbjørnsvik
- Owner: Kolbjørn
- Port of registry: Arendal
- Route: Kolbjørnsvik–Arendal
- Builder: Pusnes Mekansiske Verksted
- Cost: NOK 18,000
- Completed: 1915
- Out of service: 1979
- Fate: Sunk on 26 August 1981

General characteristics
- Type: Merchant ship
- Tonnage: 39 GRT / 17 NRT
- Length: 14.6 m (48 ft)
- Beam: 3.9 m (13 ft)
- Draught: 2.0 m (6 ft 7 in)

SF Kolbjørn II, from 1954 MF Kolbjørn II, was a passenger ferry which operated in the harbor basin of what is today Arendal Municipality in Agder, Norway. The ship was owned and operated by the eponymous shipping company Kolbjørn.

The vessel was built by Pusnes Mekansiske Verksted in 1915 as a replacement for SF Colbjørn. Kolbjørn II ran on a cross-bay route between her namesake Kolbjørnsvik and the downtown of Arendal. Originally a steamship, she was rebuilt as a motor ship in 1954, and had her motor replaced in 1963 and 1974.

She lost her passenger certificate in 1979. As a replacement, MF Kolbjørn III was built as a near identical replica, even reusing the motor. Kolbjørn II was deliberately sunk in Sørfjorden at Risør in 1981.

== Specifications ==
Kolbjørn II was a wooden-hull passenger ferry with a registered capacity of 76 passengers. She was 14.6 meters (48 ft) long, had a beam of 3.9 meters (13 ft) and a draght of 2.0 meters (6 ft 7 in). This gave her her a register tonnage of 39 gross and 17 net.

== History ==
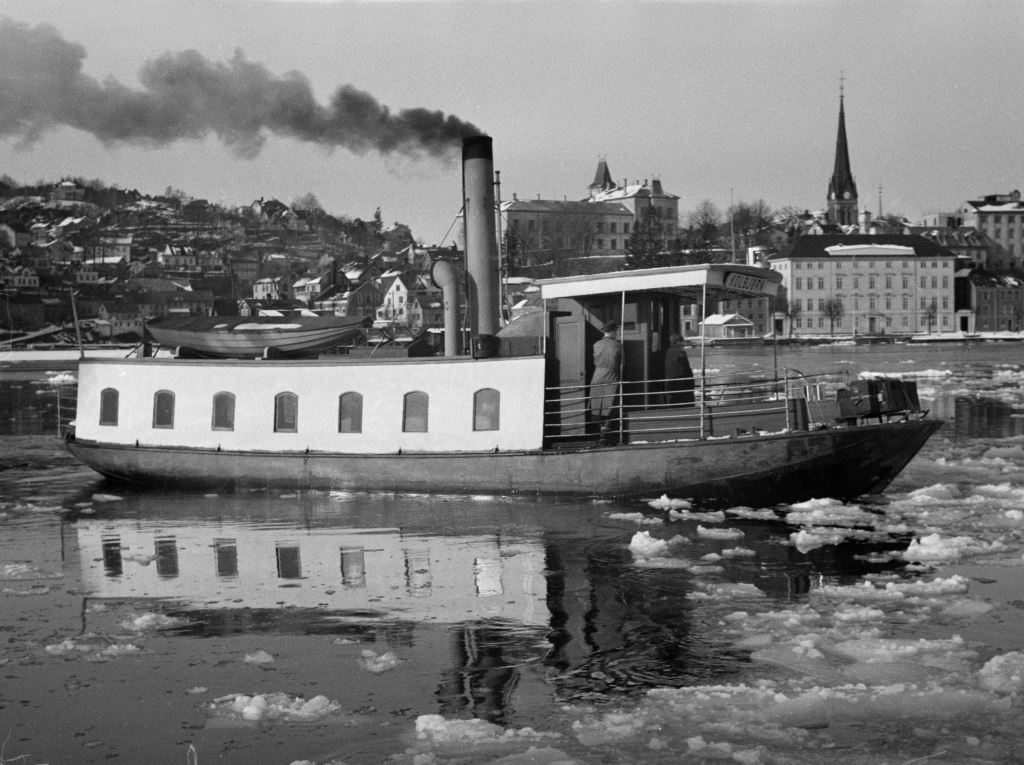
SF Kolbjørn II in 1947

Kolbjørn II was the second ship operated by Kolbjørn on the route between Hisøy and Arendal. By 1915, the passengers were so discontent with the existing SF Colbjørn, that they held a townhall meeting, led by the major of Hisøy Municipality. People were discontent with irregularities in service, safety, comfort and ticket prices. The board of the ferry company took the point, and ordered SS Kolbjørn II from Pusnes Mekansiske Verksted.

The ship cost 18 thousand kroner and was delivered in 1915. She entered service in December 1915. Already on 23 December, she ran aground on Steinskaret. Her propeller was damaged and she had to be sent to a shipyard for repairs. She was upgraded with electric lights in 1928. The vessel collided with a motor ship in 1934, and had to be repaired.

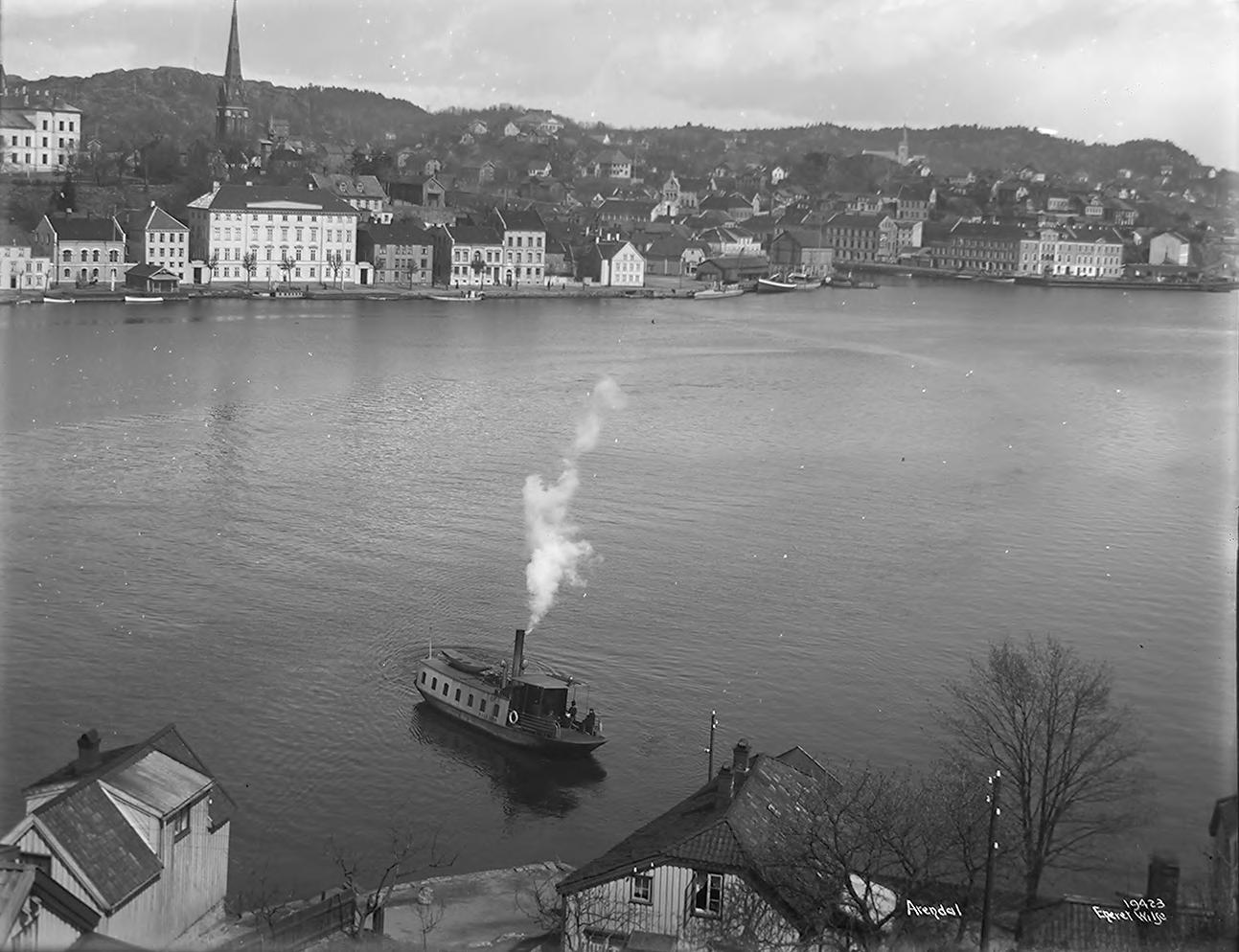
Kolbjørn II in 1917, with Kolbjørnsvik in the foreground and Arendal in the background

Kolbjørn II kept for almost all her history a 20-minute headway on the route across the basin. However, during the Second World War in the early 1940s, there was such a shortage of coal, that her headway was reduced to 30 minutes. In addition, she had to be fuled by firewood. The winter of 1942 was so cold that the entire basin froze solid and it was impossible to operate the ferry route for a period of time.

By the early 1950s, the vessel passed half a million passengers. The steam technology was becoming antiquated, and in 1951 a proposal was made to build a new ferry. Instead, the company opted to rebuild the ferry as a motor ship, costing 70 thousand kroner. This removed the need for an engineer to be on board, and the ship could be operated with a crew of one. Already in 1963 a new motor, from Rapp, was installed, costing kr. 59 thousand. It was replaced by a Volvo Penta in 1974 for 80 thousand kroner.

The ship was lost its passenger certificate in 1979. Their main concern was the structural ingegrity of the hull, and particularly that the welding seams could break during icy conditions. As a stop-gap measure, MF Tromøy was put into the Hisøy route, in addition to its regular services to Tromøya.

The company ordered a new ship, MF Kolbjørn III. The new ship was to be built so close a replica of the old one as possible. Kolbjørn II was therefore sailed up to Risør. Construction started in January 1980 and was concluded in May. No drafts were made. Instead, each component was copied onto a template and then a new component based on it. The motor was transferred, as was the passenger bench. Kolbjørn II was then sunk on 26 August 1981 in Sørfjorden in Risør Municipality.
