= SF Kolbjørn =

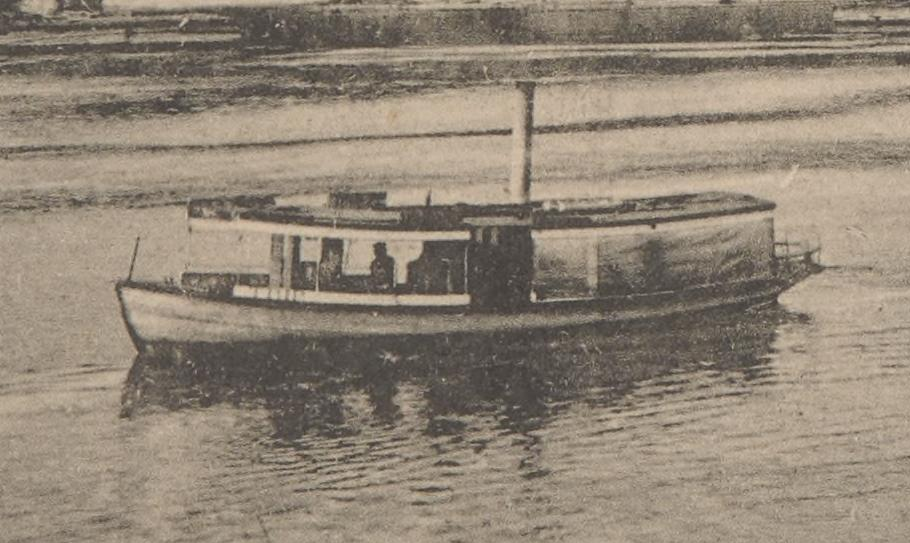
- SF Colbjørn while in Arendal

History
- Name: SF Colbjørn; SF Kolbjørn
- Namesake: Kolbjørnsvik
- Owner: Kolbjørn (1893–1916); Norwegian State Railways (1920–40)
- Port of registry: Arendal (1893–1916)
- Route: Kolbjørnsvik–Arendal (1893–1916)
- Builder: Arendal Mekansiske Verksted
- Cost: NOK 8,000
- Completed: 1893
- Out of service: 1940
- Fate: Sank in 1940, possibly due to military action

General characteristics
- Type: Merchant ship
- Tonnage: 10.58 GRT / 6.20 NRT
- Length: 12.2 m (40 ft)
- Beam: 2.9 m (9 ft 6 in)
- Draught: 1.9 m (6 ft 3 in)
- Capacity: 51 passengers

SF Colbjørn, later SF Kolbjørn, was a passenger ferry, later doubling as a tugboat.

She was built by Arendal Mekaniske Verksted in 1893 for the newly established company Kolbjørn, who put her into service in what is today Arendal Municipality in Norway, between Kolbjørnsvik, Tyholmen and Norodden. She was sold in 1916 with the delivery of her replacement SF Kolbjørn II.

She served as a tugboat in Drammen until 1920, when she was bought by the Norwegian State Railways. They moved her to the lake of Snåsavatnet, where she was used as a work boat: transporting personnel, carrying materials and as a tugboat. Once the Nordland Line was finished along the lake, she was relocated around 1930 to Elsfjord. She sank in 1940.

== Specifications ==
Kolbjørn was an iron-hull passenger ferry with a registered capacity of 51 passengers. She is 12.2 meters (40 ft) long, had a beam of 2.9 meters (9 ft 6 in) and a draght of 1.9 meters (6 ft 3 in). This gave her a register tonnage of 10.58 gross and 6.20 net. Her steam engine gave her a power output of 22 kW (30 hp). She had a crew of two, skipper and an engineer.

== History ==
=== Arendal ===
On 2 February 1893, a group of locals got together and founded the shipping company Kolbjørn. Their goal was to establish a regular ferry service across the harbor basin, between Hisøy and Arendal proper. The company's initial ferry, SF Colbjørn, was ordered already on 22 February 1893 from Arendal Mekaniske Verksted.

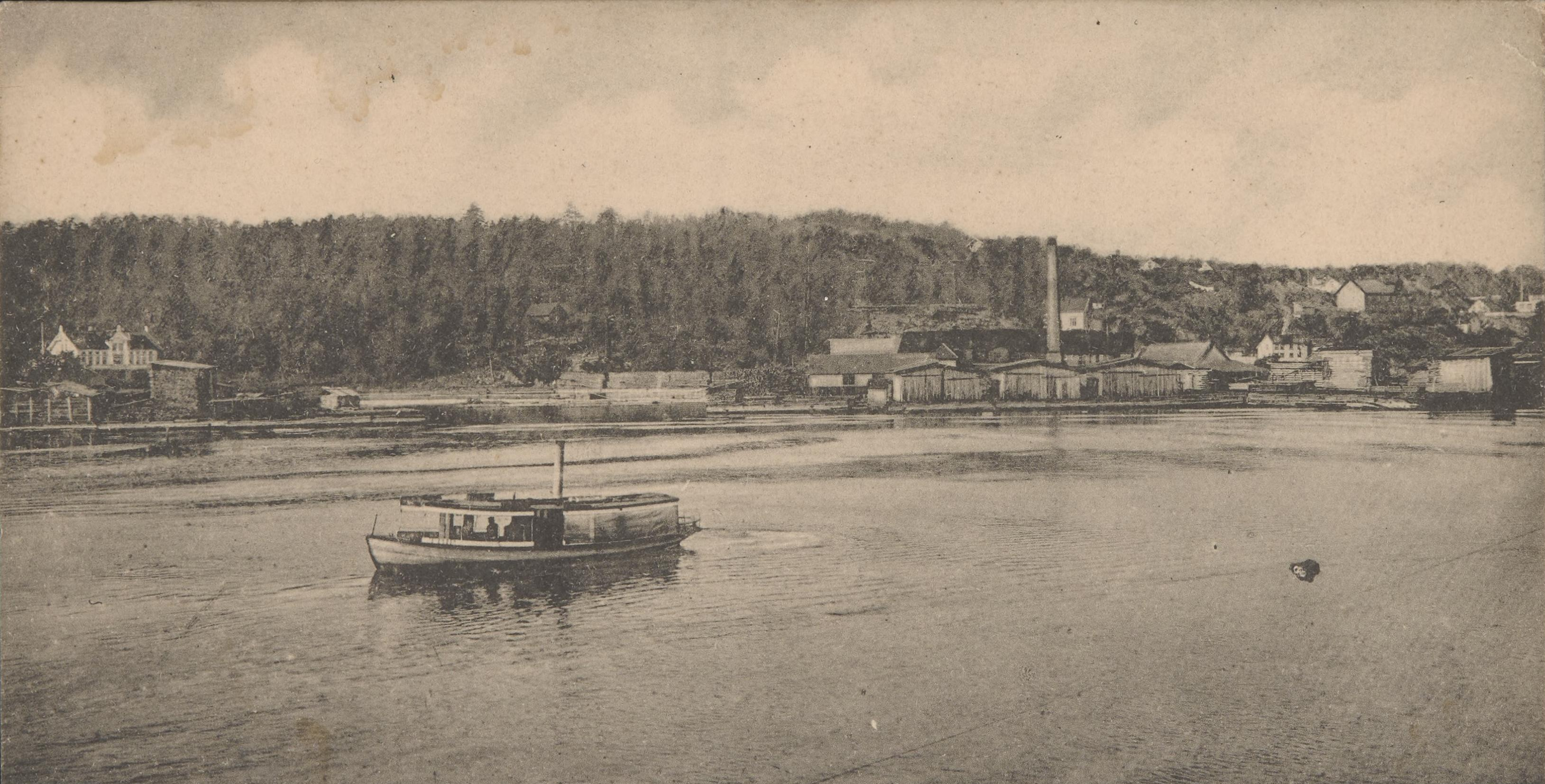
Colbjørn in Hisøy Municipality some time between 1900 and 1915

The vessel was delivered in the fall the same year. She initially operated with a 15-minute headway, but this quickly proved to be too ambitious, and was instead put into a 20-minute headway. The route started at Kolbjørnsvik, went over to Arendal at Tyholmen and then back to Norodden on Hisøy, before returning to Kolbjørnsvik.

By 1915, Colbjørn was becoming obsolete. There was called a large town meeting, led by the major. People were discontent with irregularities in service, safety, comfort and ticket prices. The discontent, and the realization that SF Colbjørn could not meet contemporary standards, resulted in the company ordering of a new ferry, SF Kolbjørn II, late the same year. She was delivered in December 1915, replacing Colbjørn.

=== Drammen ===
The company Kolbjørn sold Colbjørn to a company in Drammen in 1916, where she was used as a tugboat.

=== Snåsavatnet ===
She was then sold to the Norwegian State Railways in 1920. They were at the time building the Nordland Line along the lake of Snåsavatnet. Her size allowed her to be transported by train. Once in Snåsavatnet, the spelling of her name was Kolbjørn, although this name change may have happened earlier.

While on Snåsavatnet, the vessel had several roles. The lake still had a scheduled ship service being provided by SS Bonden, but the railways wanted to have their own ship to transport personnel and cargo. A lot of the stone for finer works was mined on the island of Bygla, and transported to site by barges hauled by Kolbjørn.

In addition to Kolbjørn, NSB had two other, smaller boats, named Stor-Staten and Litj-Staten ("Big Government" and "Little Government", respectively). There were built several quays along the lake for Kolbjørn, such as at Valløya and Bostadlandet.

On nice Sundays, Kolbjørn did charter sightseeing trips on the lake, often with people traveling on one of the barges. Trips were typically organized by the International Order of Good Templars. The trips would typically go to one of the islands or beaches along the lake, and involved bathing and a piknik.

The railway opened between Sunnan Station and Snåsa Station on 30 October 1926. NSB established a tool handle factory at Sunnan, and Kolbjørn was kept on to freight in birch lumber for it.

=== Elsfjord ===
Around 1930 the railways no longer needed their ship on the lake. Kolbjørn was loaded onto a train and transported to Elsfjord. It remained there until around 1940, when it sank. The cause of its demise is not known, but it was possibly due to acts of war.
