= Kolbjørnsvik =

Village in Arendal Municipality, Norway

- Village
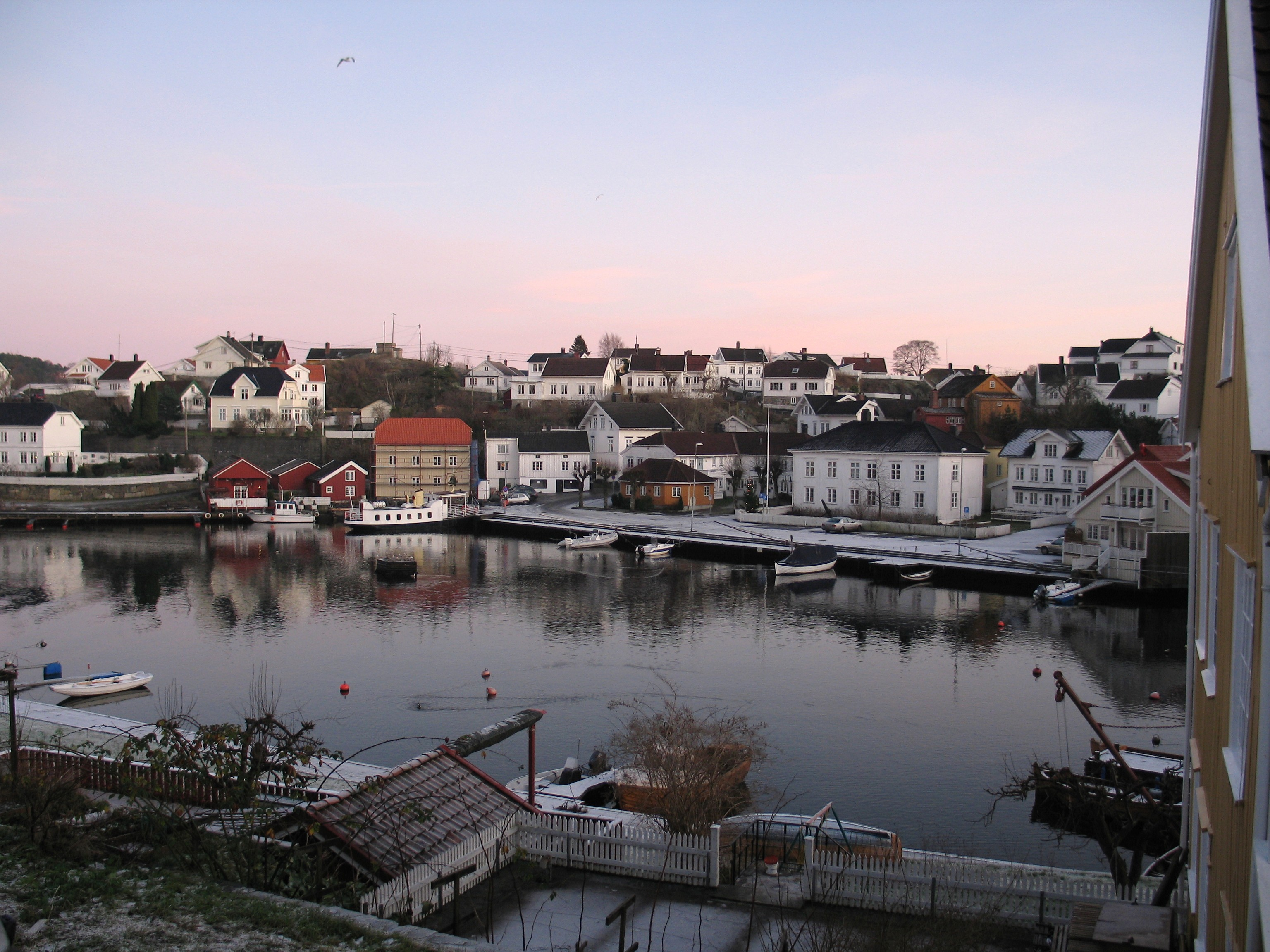
- View of the village
- Interactive map of Kolbjørnsvik
- Coordinates: 58.4518°N 08.7695°E
- Country: Norway
- Region: Southern Norway
- County: Agder
- District: Østre Agder
- Municipality: Arendal Municipality
- Elevation: 9 m (30 ft)
- Time zone: UTC+01:00 (CET)
  - Summer (DST): UTC+02:00 (CEST)
- Post Code: 4816 Kolbjørnsvik

Kolbjørnsvik is a village in Arendal Municipality in Agder county, Norway. The village is located on the northern part of the island of Hisøy, across the harbour from the town of Arendal. The village of His and the Hisøy Church lie about 2 kilometres (1.2 mi) south of Kolbjørnsvik. Today, the village is considered to be part of the town of Arendal, so separate population statistics are not kept.

== History ==
The village was the administrative centre of the old Hisøy Municipality.

Kolbjørnsvik has been connected to downtown Arendal by the ferry since 1893 by the ferry company Kolbjørn. They have operated three ferries on the route: SF Colbjørn (1893–1915), MF Kolbjørn II (1915–79) and its relica, MF Kolbjørn III (1980–).

== Media gallery ==
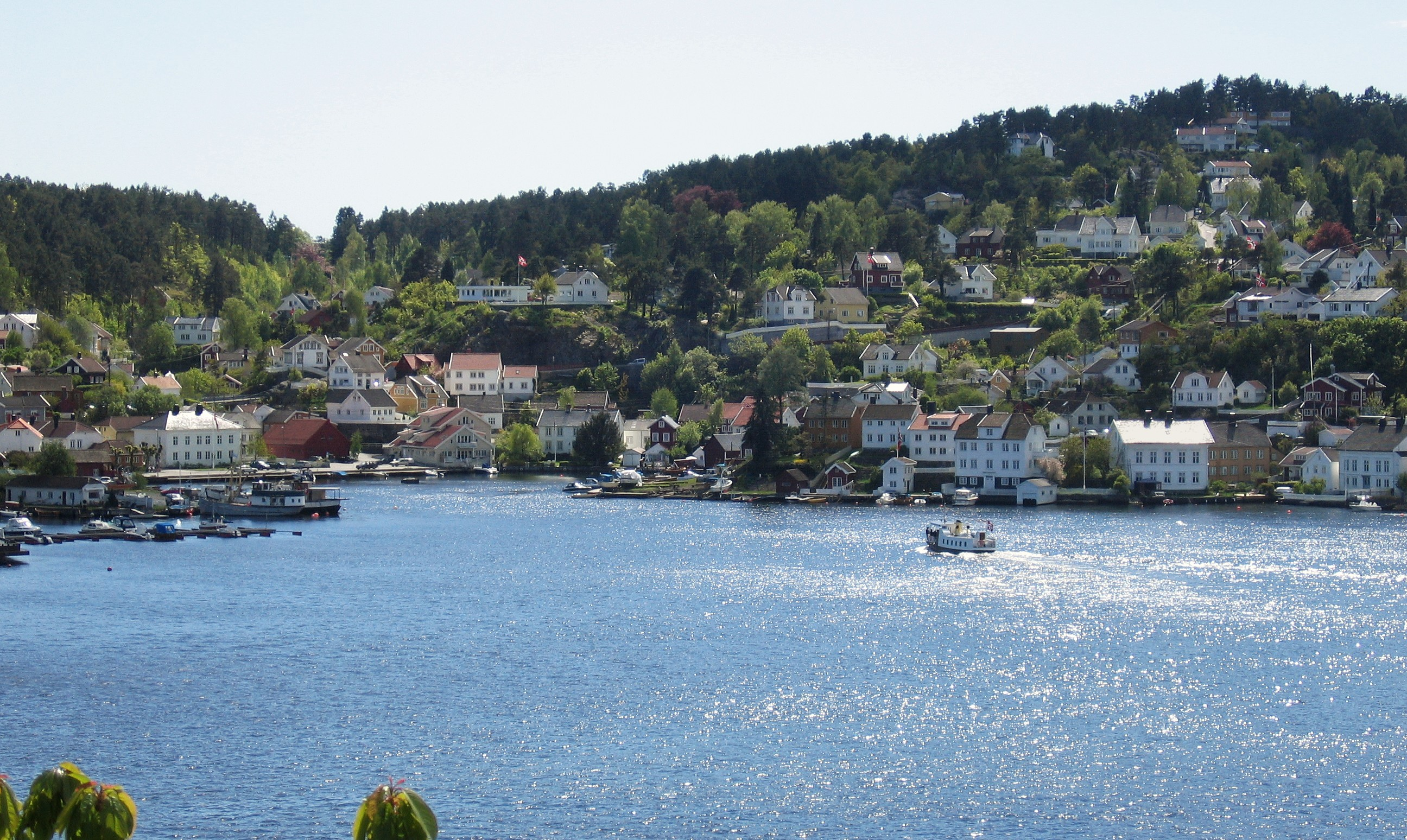
View of Kolbjørnsvik

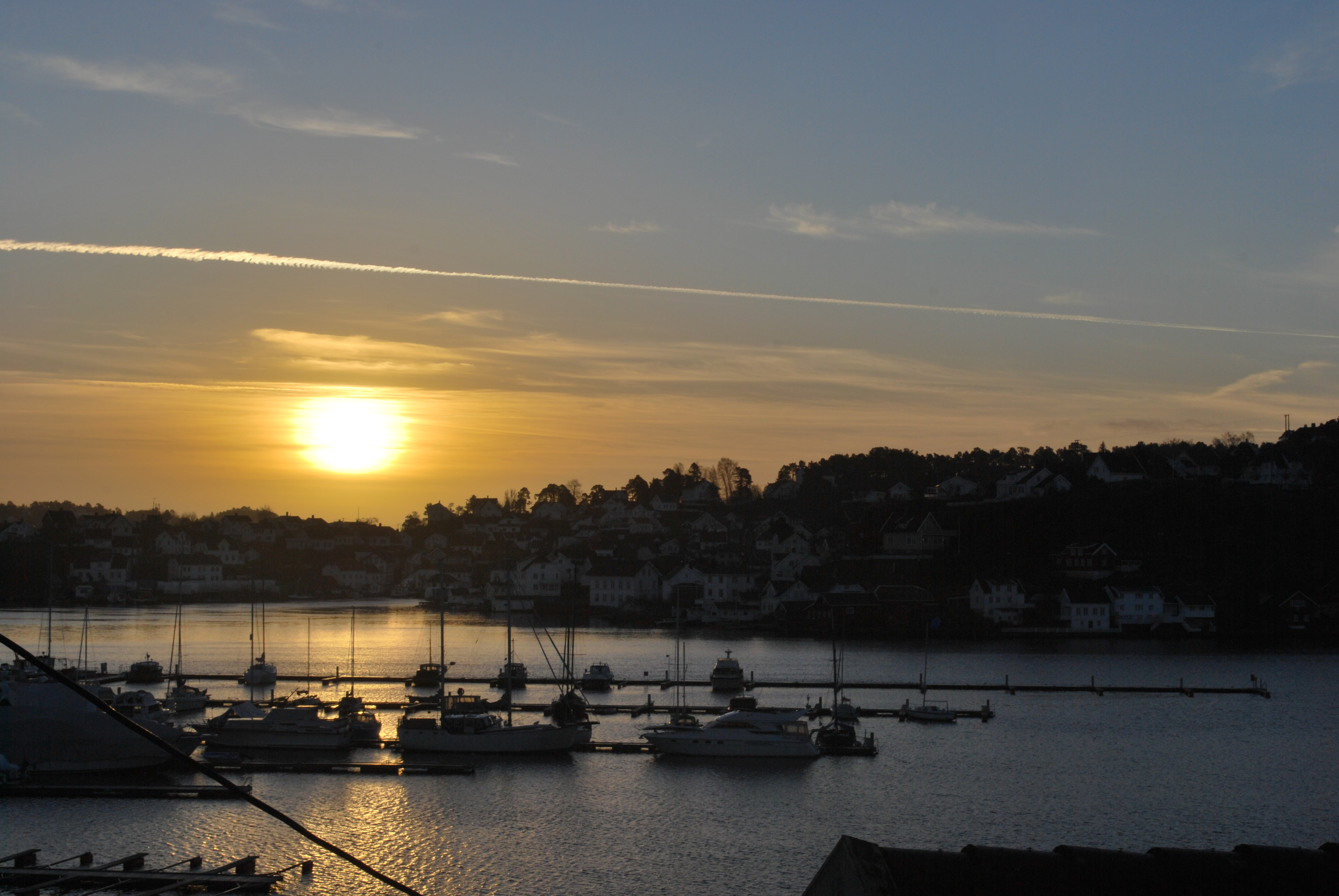
Evening view of the village
