= Pusnes =

Pusnes may refer to:

- Pusnes, Arendal, an industrial village area in Arendal municipality in Aust-Agder county, Norway
- Aker Pusnes, a mooring and decking company based in Arendal, Norway
- Pusnes Mekaniske Verksted, a former shipbuilding company on Tromøya in Arendal, Norway
