= Birger Dannevig =

Norwegian journalist and historian

- Born: 24 December 1921; Arendal, Norway
- Died: 23 May 1998 (aged 76)
- Occupations: Journalist and historian

Birger Dannevig (24 December 1921 – 23 May 1998) was a Norwegian journalist and historian.

== Biography ==
Dannevig was born in Arendal as the son of Alf Nicolay Dannevig and Sofie Marie Knudsen. He published a total of 54 books, mainly on the history of shipping, including Farsunds sjøfarts historie from 1967, Skip og menn from 1968, and Grimstads sjøfarts historie from 1971. During the Occupation of Norway by Nazi Germany he chaired the local chapter of the clandestine intelligence organisation XU.
