= His, Agder =

Village in Arendal Municipality, Norway

His
- Village
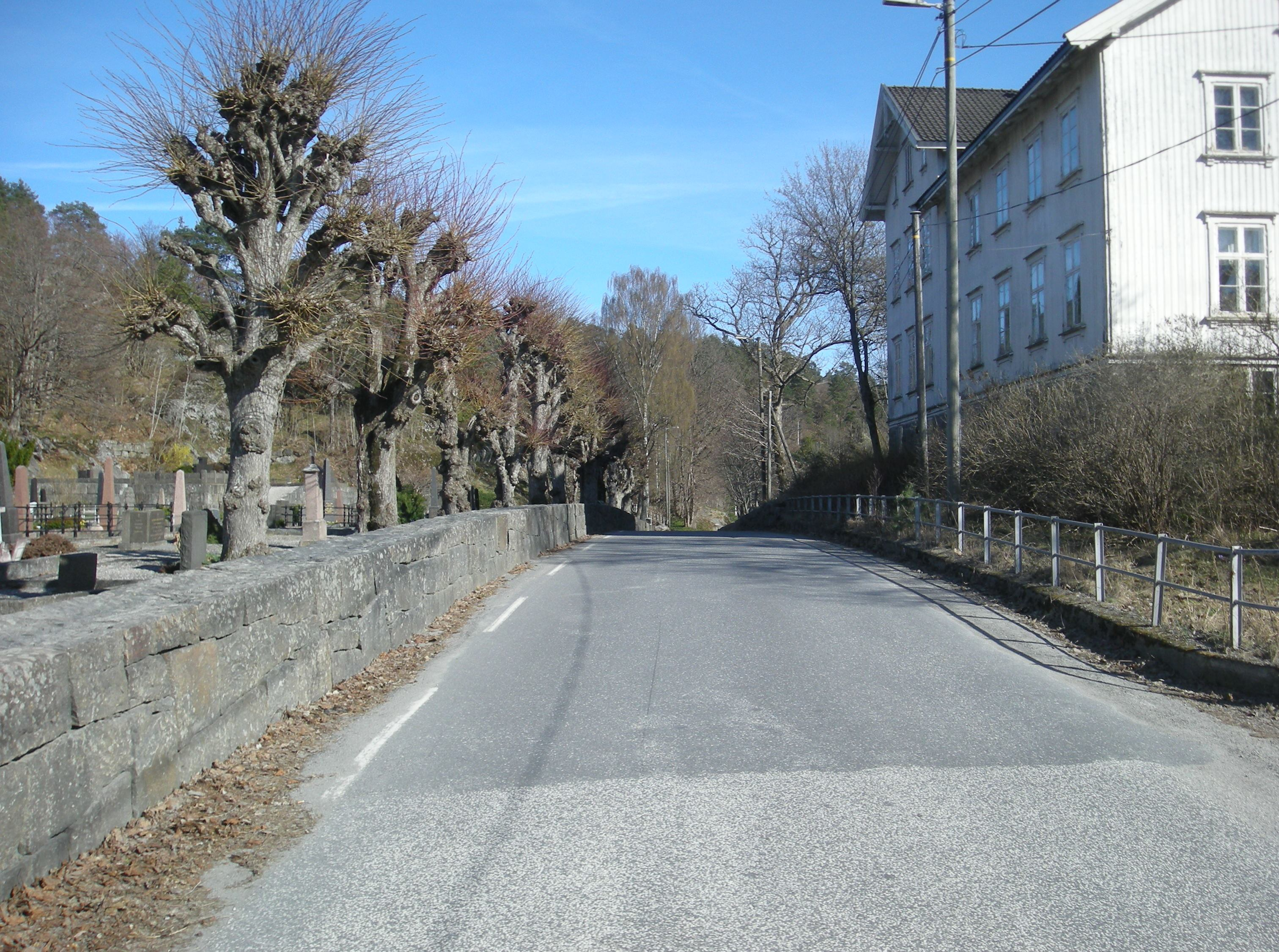
- View of the road past the village cemetery
- Interactive map of His
- Coordinates: 58.4314°N 08.7434°E
- Country: Norway
- Region: Southern Norway
- County: Agder
- District: Østre Agder
- Municipality: Arendal Municipality
- Elevation: 18 m (59 ft)
- Time zone: UTC+01:00 (CET)
  - Summer (DST): UTC+02:00 (CEST)
- Post Code: 4817 His

His is a village in Arendal Municipality in Agder county, Norway. The village is located in the central part of the island of Hisøy, along the Skagerrak coast. The village is the site of the historic Hisøy Church. The main village on the island, Kolbjørnsvik lies about 2 kilometres (1.2 mi) northeast of His, and the city centre of Arendal lies about 5 kilometres (3.1 mi) to the northeast.
