= Alf Dannevig =

Norwegian marine biologist

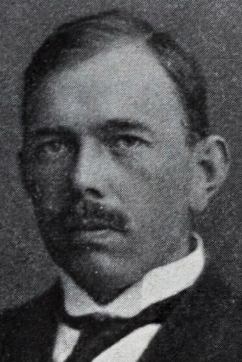

Alf Nicolay Dannevig (1 May 1886 – 12 September 1960) was a Norwegian marine biologist who specialized on fish, and a local politician. He was the son of sea captain Gunder Mathiesen Dannevig, and the father of writer Birger Dannevig. He managed the hatchery Flødevigen Utklekningsanstalt from 1911 to 1956. His research included cod, salmon, trout, cultivation of lobster, and the marine biology of Skagerrak. He served as Mayor of Hisøy Municipality in 1945 and from 1948 to 1960.
