= Kolbjørnsen =

Kolbjørnsen is a surname. Notable people with the surname include:

- Elida Kolbjørnsen (born 2008), Norwegian
- Morten Kolbjørnsen (born 1958), Norwegian politician

== See also ==
- Kolbjørn
