= Ærøya =

Island in Agder, Norway

- Interactive map of the island

Geography
- Location: Agder, Norway
- Coordinates: 58.41566°N 8.76568°E
- Area: 0.12 km^{2} (0.046 sq mi)
- Length: 600 m (2000 ft)
- Width: 350 m (1150 ft)
- Coastline: 1.8 km (1.12 mi)
- Highest elevation: 20 m (70 ft)

Administration
- Norway
- County: Agder
- Municipality: Arendal Municipality

Demographics
- Population: 0 (2017)
- Pop. density: 0/km^{2} (0/sq mi)

Ærøya is an unpopulated island in Arendal Municipality in Agder county, Norway. The 0.12-square-kilometre (30-acre) island lies along the Skagerrak coast about 700 metres (2,300 ft) south of the larger island of Hisøy. The islands of Havsøya and Merdø lie to the northeast, the islands of Store Torungen and Lille Torungen lie to the southeast, and the island of Gjervoldsøy lies to the west.

== See also ==
- List of islands of Norway
