= Gard (company) =

Marine insurance company in Norway

- Company type: Marine Insurers
- Industry: Insurance
- Founded: 1907
- Headquarters: Arendal, Norway
- Area served: World wide
- Key people: Rolf Thore Roppestad (CEO)
- Products: P&I, Marine and Energy insurance, including renewables
- Revenue: USD 1,312 million (2025)
- Number of employees: 750+
- Website: www.gard.no

Gard is a mutual company and operates around the world within marine insurance. It is the largest Protection & Indemnity insurer of the 12 P&I Clubs that are members of the International Group of P&I Clubs.

Gard's customers are shipowners and operators, shipyards, and companies involved in the upstream oil and gas markets, and offshore windfarm operators. The group employs 784 people in 15 offices in Arendal, Athens, Bergen, Bermuda, Aarhus, Copenhagen, Helsinki, Hong Kong, Imabari, London, New York, Oslo, Singapore, Rio de Janeiro, and Tokyo.

Gard also has a wholly owned subsidiary in Gard Marine & Energy Limited.

== History ==
Assuranceforeningen Gard, the P&I Club, was founded in Arendal, Norway in 1907. Historically, Arendal was an important shipping centre at that time, but the establishment of Gard was also driven by the reluctance of owners of sailing ships to subsidise the liabilities arising from owners operating steam ships. Although Gard's P&I business started in 1907, its marine insurance activities can be traced back to as far as 1867 with the establishment of Æolus, which later became part of the Storebrand group.

Over time, the importance of Arendal as a major Norwegian shipping-hub waned. The Second World War also took a heavy toll on owners insured with Gard. As a result, by 1945, the Gard's membership had shrunk considerably. Two factors played an important part in Gard's development in the post-war period, the growth of the Norwegian national fleet between 1950 and 1970, and the increasingly international nature of Gard's P&I membership. While Gard today retains its Norwegian identity, it has become a global P&I club, where less than 14% of the current entered tonnage is domiciled in Norway.

Gard purchased the If's marine and energy book in October 2003.

In 2025 Gard completed the purchase of Codan's marine and energy portfolio, and established 2 offices in Denmark.

== Business ==
The group's business focuses on P&I and hull covers for shipowners, operators and charterers; marine builders' risks, the oil and gas markets, defence and small craft and offshore windfarm operators. .

=== Shipowners, operators and charterers ===
Gard provides liability, property, and income insurances to shipowners and operators, including tailor-made covers adapted for individual operators, as well as many non-standard P&I shipping covers.

Liability insurance, known as P&I insurance, protects the shipowner against third-party liabilities and expenses arising from the ownership and operation of ships. The insurance is provided through a mutual structure which means that the buyers of the insurance are effectively the insurer.

One of the particularities of the P&I clubs, is that they participate in a claims sharing and collective reinsurance purchasing arrangement through the International Group of P&I Clubs. The reinsurance programme is the largest in the world. The arrangement, due to its size and structure, enables the clubs to significantly reduce their need for risk capital in a cost-effective way. The aim is for these cost savings to be reflected in the premium levels shipowners pay for their P&I cover over time.

Property insurance covers the assured against losses that may occur to the vessel and her equipment as a result of an accident, while income insurance protects against losses where the ship is wholly or partially deprived of income as a result of it being out of operation. These insurances are provided by Gard on a commercial basis rather than through the mutual organisation. The earnings from this business are therefore retained for the benefit of the mutual members (the buyers of mutual P&I cover).

=== Marine builders risk ===
Gard also provides cover for the shipbuilding industry for the risks involving in building ships (from “keel laying” to delivery) and for projects where a ship is converted from one type of use to another. This includes covers such as towage, delay in delivery and non-delivery. There is also mortgage covers for banks and financial institutions which protect the policyholder against the perils of non-payment of outstanding loans and interests in “sailing” ships, i.e., they are not linked to ships being built.

=== Oil and gas markets ===
Gard provides insurance for companies in the upstream oil and gas industry, including large oil producers, as well as contractors operating mobile offshore drilling units, such as offshore accommodation units and FPSOs. The covers range from traditional property and casualty to liability insurances. The company has also entered the renewables market with insurance for offshore wind power projects.

=== Small craft ===
Insurance covers for operators and owners of small crafts such as passenger and local ferries, fishing vessels, tugs, dredgers, coastal cargo carriers, pushers, pontoons, barges and more.

=== Defence ===
Insurance against legal and other costs incurred in establishing and defending claims from business operations.

=== Offshore wind ===
Following the purchase of the marine and energy portfolio of Codan, Gard is today one of the market leaders in offshore wind insurance.
