= Hisøy Church =

Church in Agder, Norway

- Hisøy kirke
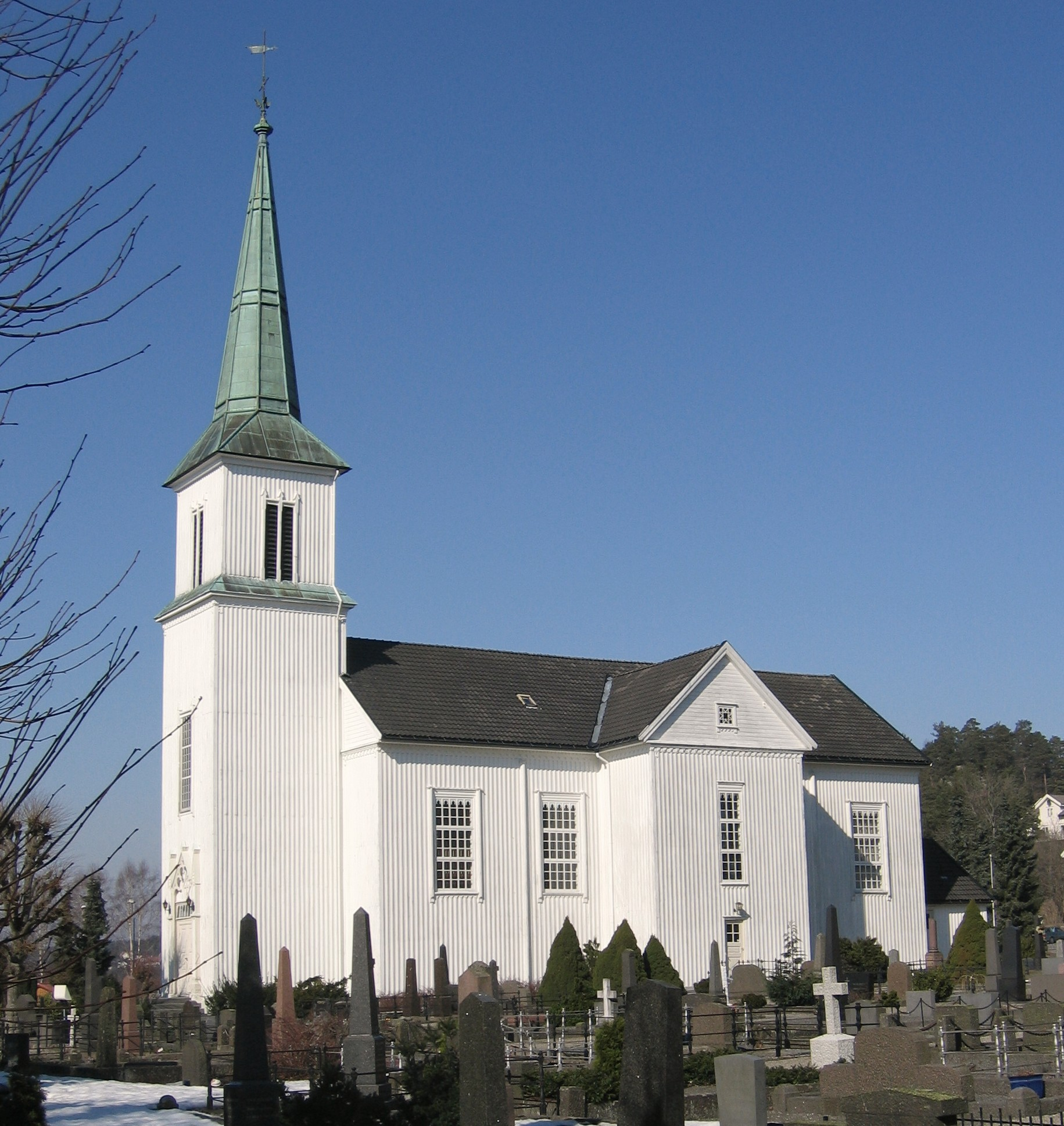
- View of the church
- Hisøy Church
- 58.433388°N 08.747998°E
- Location: Arendal Municipality, Agder
- Country: Norway
- Denomination: Church of Norway
- Previous denomination: Catholic Church
- Churchmanship: Evangelical Lutheran

History
- Status: Parish church
- Founded: 13th century
- Consecrated: 11 Nov 1849

Architecture
- Functional status: Active
- Architect: Gustav Adolph Lammers
- Architectural type: Cruciform
- Style: Empire style
- Completed: 1849 (177 years ago)
- Closed: 1500s-1849

Specifications
- Capacity: 500
- Materials: Wood

Administration
- Diocese: Agder og Telemark
- Deanery: Arendal prosti
- Parish: Hisøy
- Norwegian Cultural Heritage Site
- Type: Church
- Status: Automatically protected
- ID: 84578

Hisøy Church (Norwegian: Hisøy kirke) is a parish church of the Church of Norway in Arendal Municipality in Agder county, Norway. It is located in the village of His on the island of Hisøya. It is one of the churches for the Hisøy parish which is part of the Arendal prosti (deanery) in the Diocese of Agder og Telemark. The white, wooden, empire style church was built in a cruciform design in 1849 using plans drawn up by the architect Gustav Adolph Lammers. The church seats about 500 people. From 1881 until 1992 it was the main church for Hisøy Municipality.

== History ==
The earliest existing historical records of the church date back to the year 1320, but the church was likely built during the 13th century. The church was part of the Øyestad Church parish, and this church was likely an annex chapel. In 1620, Hisøy church is not mentioned in the diocese's land register, so the church likely was closed down at that point.

With an increasing population in the 19th century, the difficult road from the island of Hisøy to the mainland Øyestad Church led the island's residents to demand their own church. In 1847, the area of Hisøy was made to be a separate parish from Øyestad, and they immediately set in motion plans to build a church. Gustav Adolph Lammers was hired to design the church. Originally the church was to have two towers, but that didn't work out and it ended up with only one tower. The new church building was consecrated on 11 November 1849.

In 1892, the small original tower on the church was torn down and rebuilt into a larger, more structurally sound tower. In 1896, the balcony seating in the church was rebuilt.

== Parish priests ==
Hisøy Church has had many different parish priests over its history. The first full-time priest assigned to his parish was not until 1872. The priests are listed below.

- 1872-1893: Abraham Vilhelm Heffermehl
- 1894-1900: Vilhelm Bertinus Sørensen
- 1901-1905: Ludvig Daae Zwilgmeyer
- 1905-1911: Hans Ellertsen Woll
- 1911-1915: Erik Olsen Feet
- 1916-1923: Christoph Heinrich Møller-Nielsen
- 1923-1931: Eyvind Broch
- 1931-1951: Olaf Reinhardt Sagedahl
- 1951-1971: Birger Ulrich Olsen
- 1973-1978: Volrath Vogt Bugge
- 1979-1986: Reidar Svoren
- 1986-????: Svein Holberg
- Since 2016: Erik Noddeland

== See also ==
- List of churches in Agder og Telemark
