= Hisøy Municipality =

Former municipality in Aust-Agder, Norway

Hisøy Municipality Hisøy kommune
- Former municipality
- His herred (historic name); Hisø herred (historic name)
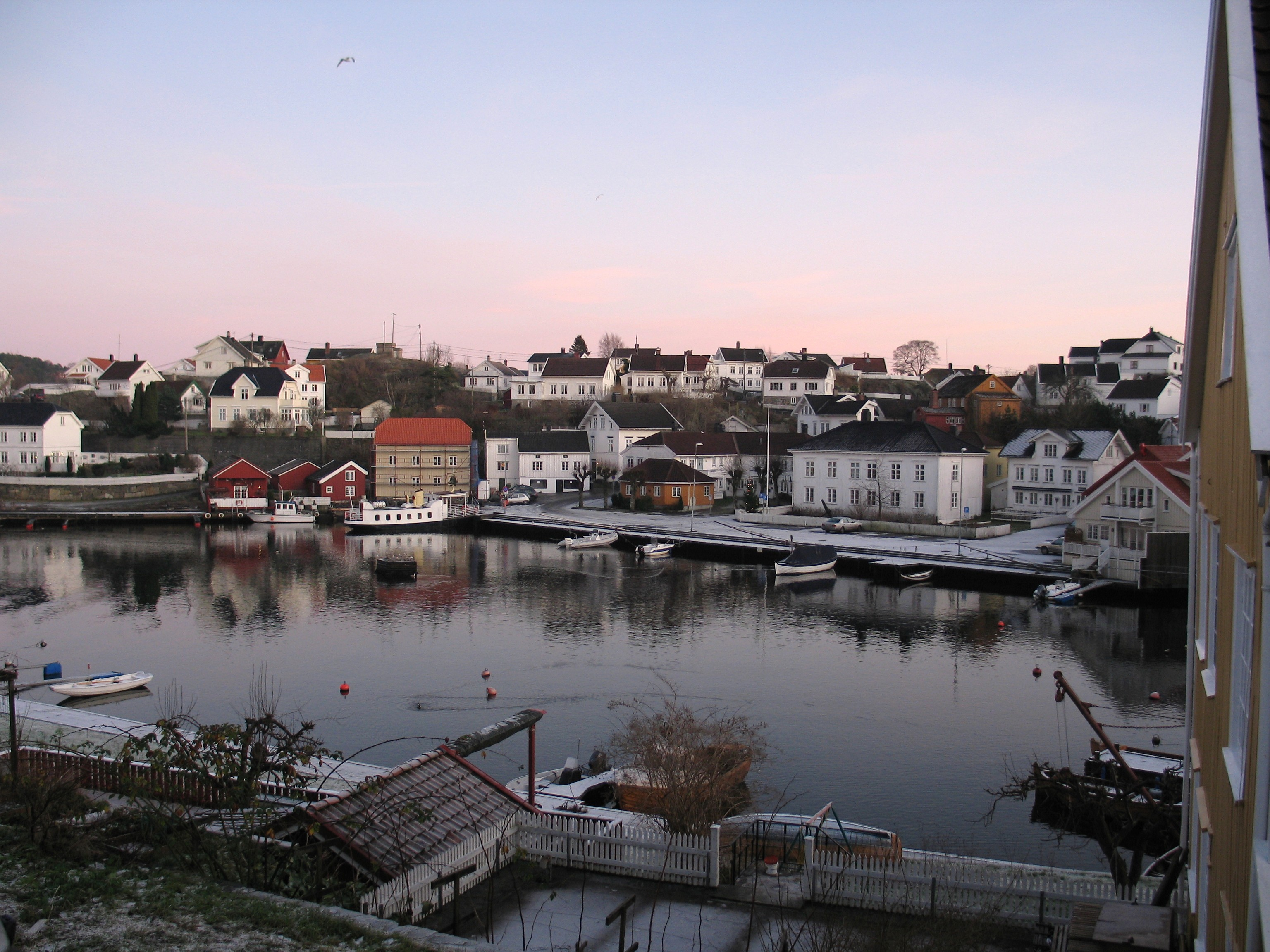
- View of Kolbjørnsvik

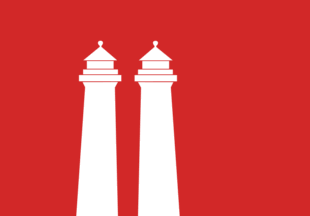
- Flag Coat of arms

- Aust-Agder within Norway

- Hisøy within Aust-Agder
- Coordinates: 58°25′44″N 08°44′37″E
- Country: Norway
- County: Aust-Agder
- District: Østre Agder
- Established: 1 Jan 1881
  - Preceded by: Øiestad Municipality
- Disestablished: 1 Jan 1992
  - Succeeded by: Arendal Municipality
- Administrative centre: Kolbjørnsvik

Government
  - Mayor (1990–1991): Liv Marit Moland Olsen (Ap)

Area (upon dissolution)
  - Total: 9.8 km^{2} (3.8 sq mi)
  - Rank: #445 in Norway
- Highest elevation: 99 m (325 ft)

Population (1991)
  - Total: 4,026
  - Rank: #239 in Norway
  - Density: 410.8/km^{2} (1,064/sq mi)
  - Change (10 years): ▲ +4.6%
- Demonym: Hisøyfolk

Official language
  - Norwegian form: Bokmål
- Time zone: UTC+01:00 (CET)
  - Summer (DST): UTC+02:00 (CEST)
- ISO 3166 code: NO-0922

Hisøy is a former municipality in the old Aust-Agder county, Norway. The 9.8-square-kilometre (3.8 sq mi) municipality existed from 1881 until its dissolution in 1992. The area is now part of Arendal Municipality in the traditional district of Østre Agder in Agder county. The administrative centre was the village of Kolbjørnsvik on the island of Hisøy.

Prior to its dissolution in 1992, the 9.8-square-kilometre (3.8 sq mi) municipality was the 445th largest by area out of the 448 municipalities in Norway, making it the third smallest municipality in the whole nation and the smallest in Aust-Agder county. Hisøy Municipality was the 239th most populous municipality in Norway with a population of about 4,026. The municipality's population density was 410.8 inhabitants per square kilometre (1,064/sq mi) and its population had increased by 4.6% over the previous 10-year period.

== General information ==
The municipality of Hisø (later spelled Hisøy) was established on 1 January 1881 when Øiestad Municipality was divided into two: the eastern island district (population: 2,652) became the new Hisø Municipality and the western district (population: 4,474) continued as a smaller Øiestad Municipality.

On 1 January 1992, Hisøy Municipality was dissolved and the following areas were merged to form an enlarged Arendal Municipality:

- all of Hisøy Municipality (population: 4,026)
- all of Arendal Municipality (population: 12,478)
- all of Moland Municipality (population: 8,148)
- all of Tromøy Municipality (population: 4,711)
- all of Øyestad Municipality (population: 8,679)

=== Name ===
The municipality (originally the parish and island) is named Hisøy (or historically Hisø) after the old His farm (Old Norse: Hís) since the first Hisøy Church was built there. The meaning of the first element of the name is uncertain. It could come from the word hís which means "the cut" (possibly referring to how the river Nidelva turns near the island). Another The last element is øy which means "island".

Historically, the name of the municipality was spelled Hisø. On 3 November 1917, a royal resolution changed the spelling of the name of the municipality to His. On 19 July 1930, a royal resolution changed the spelling of the name of the municipality to Hisøy.

=== Coat of arms ===
The coat of arms for Hisøy municipality was granted on 12 December 1986 and it was in use until 31 December 1991 when the municipality ceased to exist. The official blazon is "Gules, two lighthouses argent issuant from the base" (Norwegian: I rødt to oppvoksende sølv fyrtårn). This means the arms have a red field (background) and the charge is two twin lighthouses. The lighthouses have a tincture of argent which means they are commonly colored white, but if the arms are made out of metal, then silver is used. The lighthouses were chosen to represent the two local lighthouses: Store Torungen Lighthouse and Lille Torungen Lighthouse which mark the waters around the island of Hisøy and the entrance to the harbour for the town of Arendal. The arms were designed by Thorleif Bredesen.

=== Churches ===
The Church of Norway had one parish (sokn) within Hisøy Municipality. At the time of the municipal dissolution, it was part of the Hisøy prestegjeld and the Aust-Nedenes prosti (deanery) in the Diocese of Agder.

Churches in Hisøy Municipality
Parish (sokn)	Church name	Location of the church	Year built
Hisøy	Hisøy Church	His	1849

== Geography ==
The municipality encompassed the islands of Hisøy, Gjervoldsøy, Havsøya, Ærøya, Store Torungen, Lille Torungen, and several other small, unpopulated islands. The highest point in the municipality was the 99-metre (325 ft) tall mountain located on the northwestern shore of the island, just southwest of the village of Kolbjørnsvik. Arendal Municipality was located to the north, Tromøy Municipality was located to the east, the Skagerrak was to the southeast, Grimstad Municipality was located to the southwest, and Øyestad Municipality was located to the west.

== Government ==
While it existed, Hisøy Municipality was responsible for primary education (through 10th grade), outpatient health services, senior citizen services, welfare and other social services, zoning, economic development, and municipal roads and utilities. The municipality was governed by a municipal council of directly elected representatives. The mayor was indirectly elected by a vote of the municipal council. The municipality was under the jurisdiction of the Nedenes District Court and the Agder Court of Appeal.

=== Municipal council ===
The municipal council (Kommunestyre) of Hisøy Municipality was made up of representatives that were elected to four year terms. The tables below show the historical composition of the council by political party.

Hisøy kommunestyre 1987–1991
Party name (in Norwegian)	Number of representatives
Labour Party (Arbeiderpartiet)	6
Conservative Party (Høyre)	7
Christian Democratic Party (Kristelig Folkeparti)	1
Liberal Party (Venstre)	3
Total number of members:	17
Note: On 1 January 1992, Hisøy Municipality became part of Arendal Municipality.

Hisøy kommunestyre 1983–1987
Party name (in Norwegian)	Number of representatives
Labour Party (Arbeiderpartiet)	6
Progress Party (Fremskrittspartiet)	1
Conservative Party (Høyre)	7
Christian Democratic Party (Kristelig Folkeparti)	1
Liberal Party (Venstre)	2
Total number of members:	17

Hisøy kommunestyre 1979–1983
Party name (in Norwegian)	Number of representatives
Labour Party (Arbeiderpartiet)	5
Conservative Party (Høyre)	8
Christian Democratic Party (Kristelig Folkeparti)	1
New People's Party (Nye Folkepartiet)	1
Liberal Party (Venstre)	2
Total number of members:	17

Hisøy kommunestyre 1975–1979
Party name (in Norwegian)	Number of representatives
Labour Party (Arbeiderpartiet)	5
Conservative Party (Høyre)	6
Christian Democratic Party (Kristelig Folkeparti)	2
New People's Party (Nye Folkepartiet)	3
Liberal Party (Venstre)	1
Total number of members:	17

Hisøy kommunestyre 1971–1975
Party name (in Norwegian)	Number of representatives
Labour Party (Arbeiderpartiet)	7
Conservative Party (Høyre)	5
Christian Democratic Party (Kristelig Folkeparti)	1
Liberal Party (Venstre)	4
Total number of members:	17

Hisøy kommunestyre 1967–1971
Party name (in Norwegian)	Number of representatives
Labour Party (Arbeiderpartiet)	8
Conservative Party (Høyre)	5
Liberal Party (Venstre)	4
Total number of members:	17

Hisøy kommunestyre 1963–1967
Party name (in Norwegian)	Number of representatives
Labour Party (Arbeiderpartiet)	8
Conservative Party (Høyre)	5
Liberal Party (Venstre)	4
Total number of members:	17

Hisøy herredsstyre 1959–1963
Party name (in Norwegian)	Number of representatives
Labour Party (Arbeiderpartiet)	7
Conservative Party (Høyre)	7
Liberal Party (Venstre)	3
Total number of members:	17

Hisøy herredsstyre 1955–1959
Party name (in Norwegian)	Number of representatives
Labour Party (Arbeiderpartiet)	7
Conservative Party (Høyre)	7
Liberal Party (Venstre)	3
Total number of members:	17

Hisøy herredsstyre 1951–1955
Party name (in Norwegian)	Number of representatives
Labour Party (Arbeiderpartiet)	7
Conservative Party (Høyre)	6
Liberal Party (Venstre)	3
Total number of members:	16

Hisøy herredsstyre 1947–1951
Party name (in Norwegian)	Number of representatives
Labour Party (Arbeiderpartiet)	6
Conservative Party (Høyre)	6
Joint list of the Liberal Party (Venstre) and the Radical People's Party (Radikale Folkepartiet)	4
Total number of members:	16

Hisøy herredsstyre 1945–1947
Party name (in Norwegian)	Number of representatives
Labour Party (Arbeiderpartiet)	7
Joint list of the Liberal Party (Venstre) and the Radical People's Party (Radikale Folkepartiet)	3
Joint List(s) of Non-Socialist Parties (Borgerlige Felleslister)	6
Total number of members:	16

Hisøy herredsstyre 1937–1941*
Party name (in Norwegian)	Number of representatives
Labour Party (Arbeiderpartiet)	4
Liberal Party (Venstre)	4
Joint list of the Conservative Party (Høyre) and the Farmers' Party (Bondepartiet)	8
Total number of members:	16
Note: Due to the German occupation of Norway during World War II, no elections were held for new municipal councils until after the war ended in 1945.

=== Mayors ===
The mayor (Norwegian: ordfører) of Hisøy Municipality was the political leader of the municipality and the chairperson of the municipal council. The following people have held this position:

- 1881–1886: Søren P. Nielsen
- 1887–1891: Ommund Christensen
- 1892–1893: S. Røer
- 1894–1895: M.B. Nielsen
- 1896–1897: Niels Bakke
- 1897–1898: Isaac Kløcker
- 1899–1901: Harald Kallevig
- 1902–1904: J. Sverdrup
- 1905–1913: G. Moland
- 1914–1917: O. Aarstøl
- 1917–1919: Anton Gundersen
- 1920–1940: Jørgen P. Jensen
- 1945–1945: Jørgen P. Jensen
- 1945–1945: Alf Dannevig
- 1946–1946: K. Seljås
- 1946–1947: I. Olsen
- 1948–1960: Alf Dannevig
- 1960–1963: Helge Bjørnholm
- 1964–1967: Gunnar Dannevig
- 1968–1975: Arthur J. Knutsen
- 1975–1975: Johan Guldal
- 1976–1983: Frithjof Holst-Pedersen (H)
- 1984–1987: Bjørn Altenborg (H)
- 1988–1989: Kåre Thorsen (V)
- 1990–1991: Liv Marit Moland Olsen (Ap)

== Media gallery ==
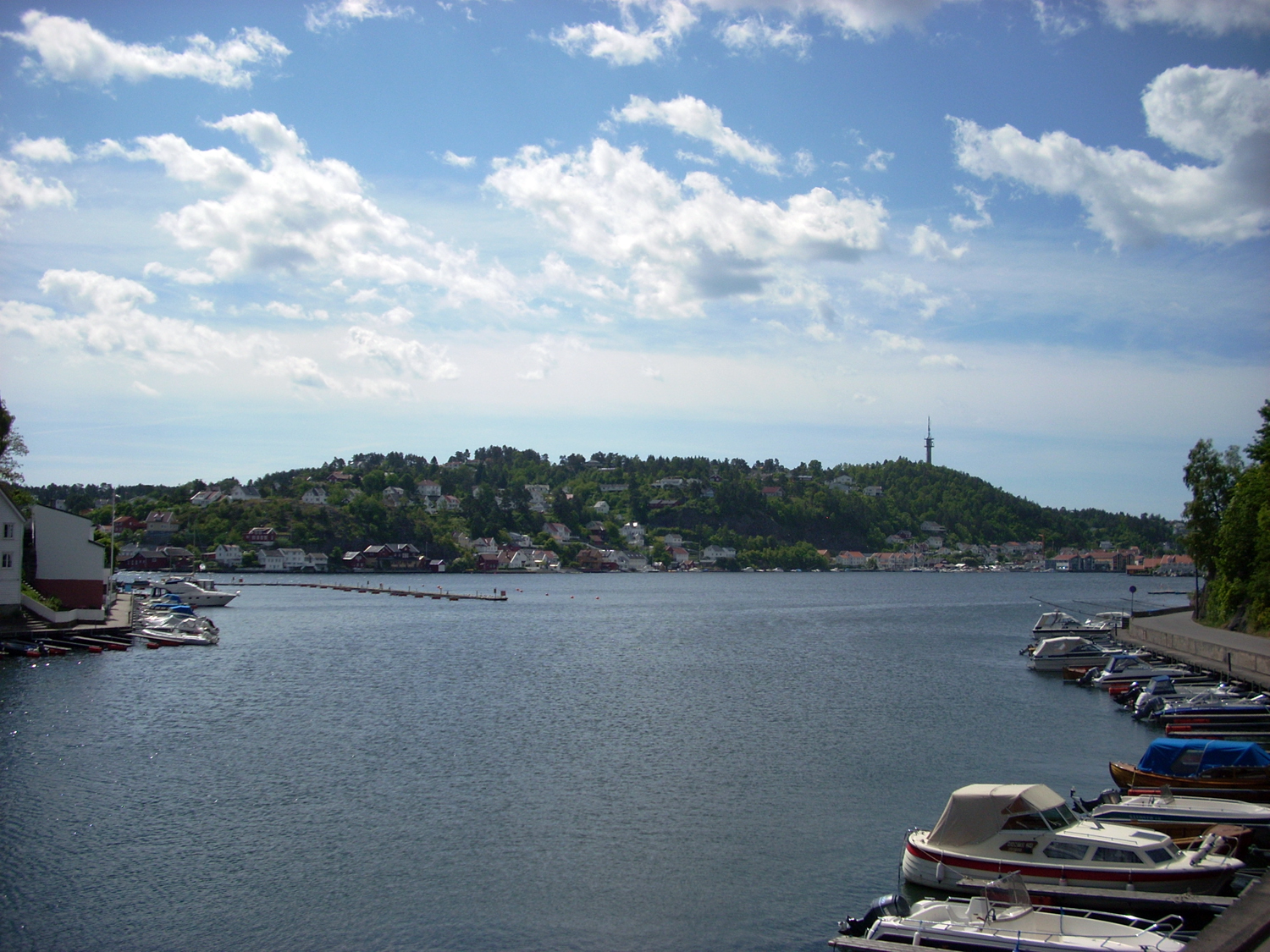
View of Hisøya from Arendal city centre

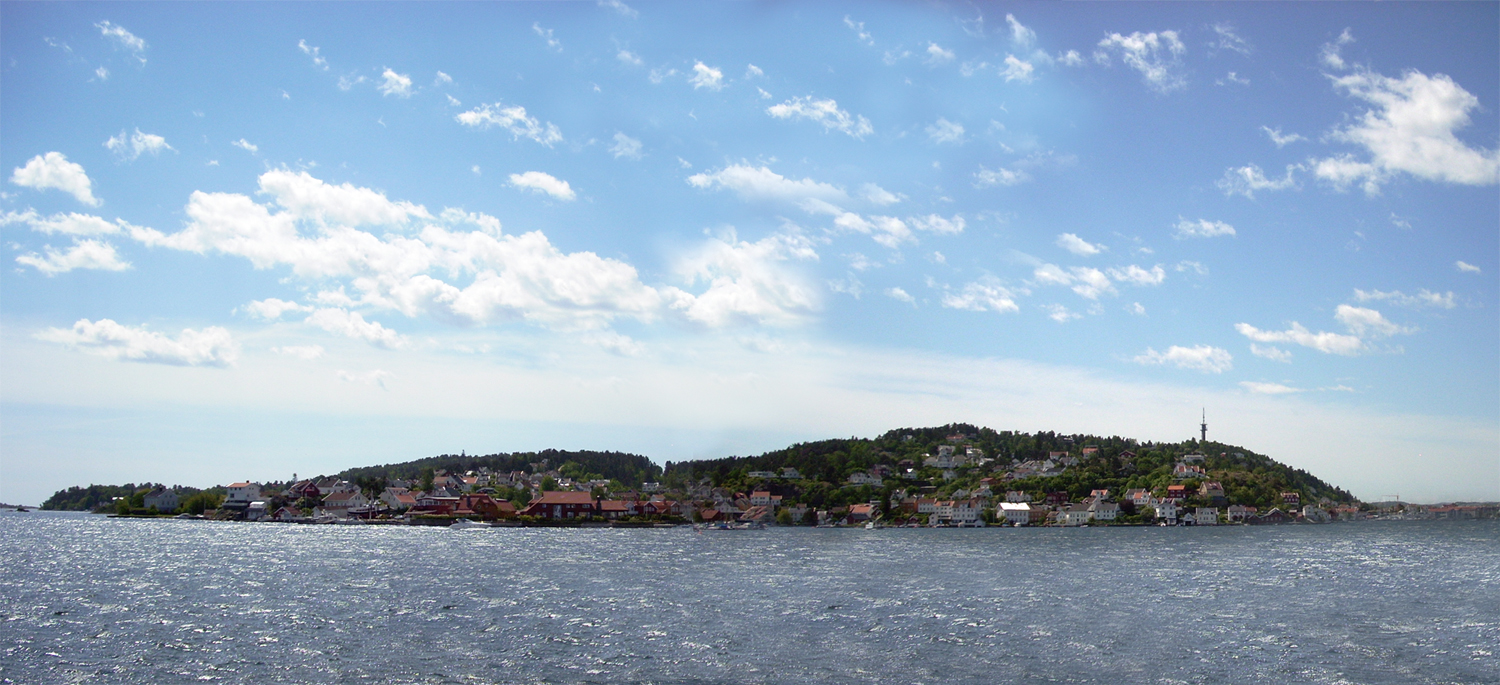
Alternate view of Hisøya

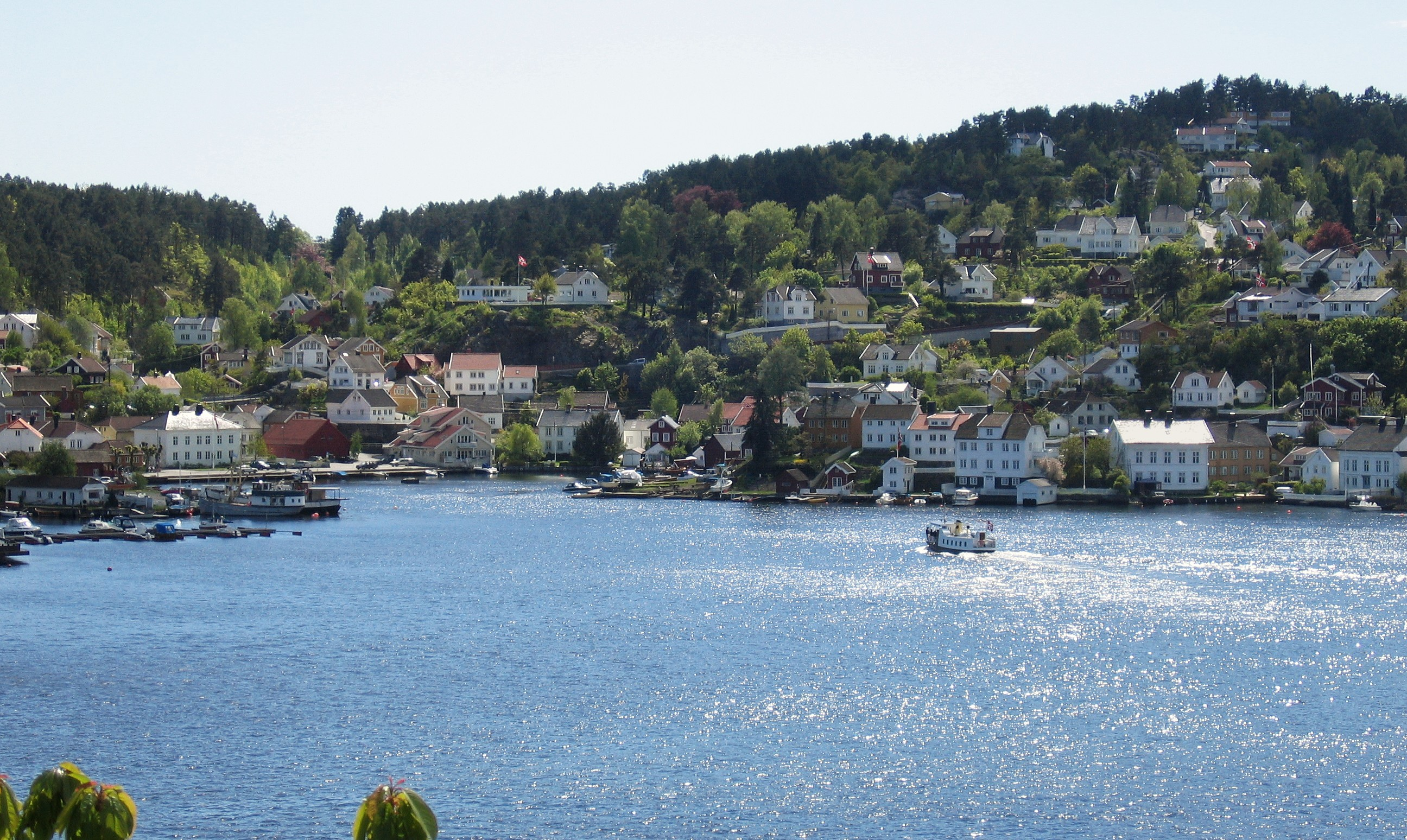
Kolbjørnsvik, the municipal centre

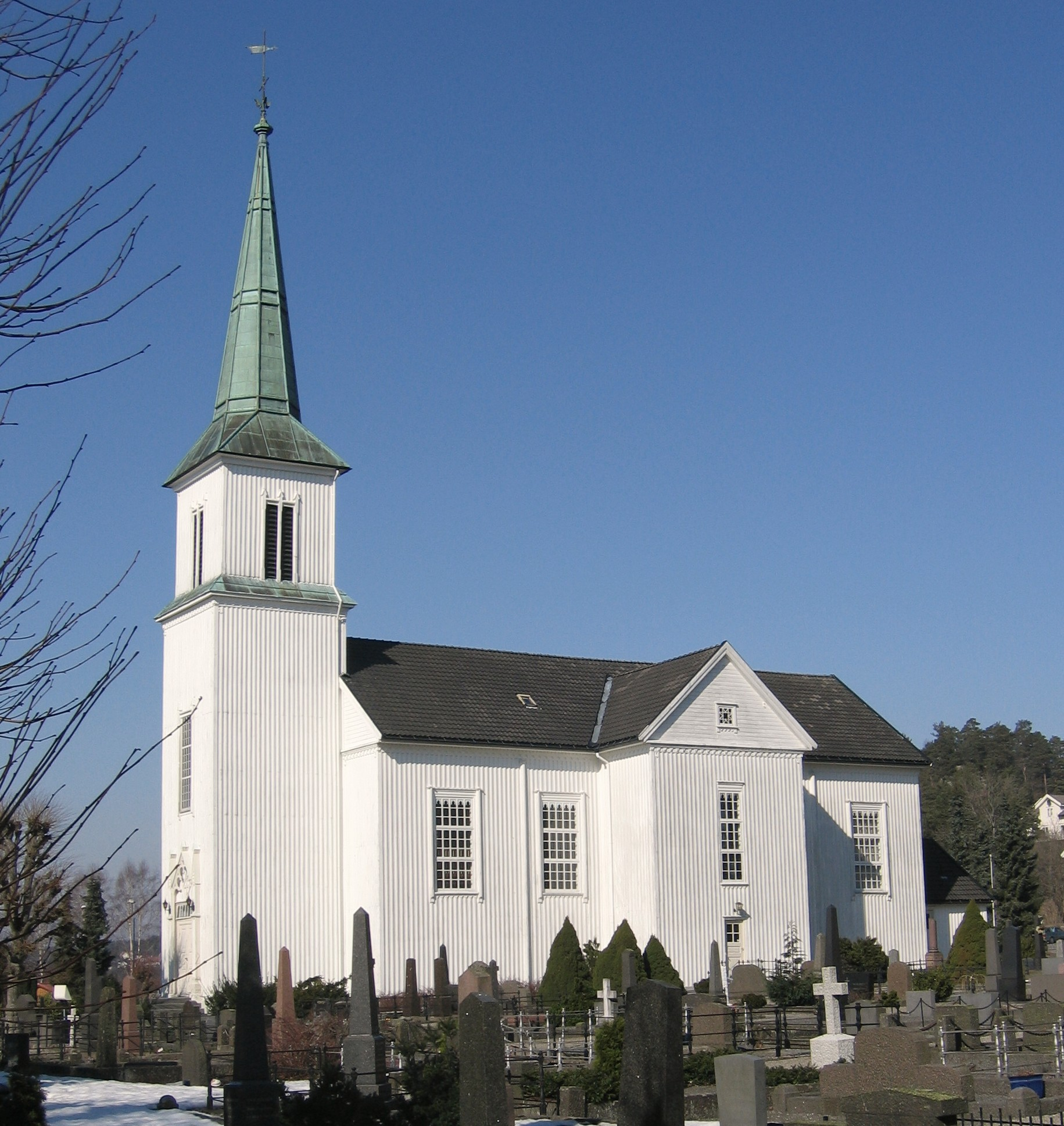
View of Hisøy Church in His

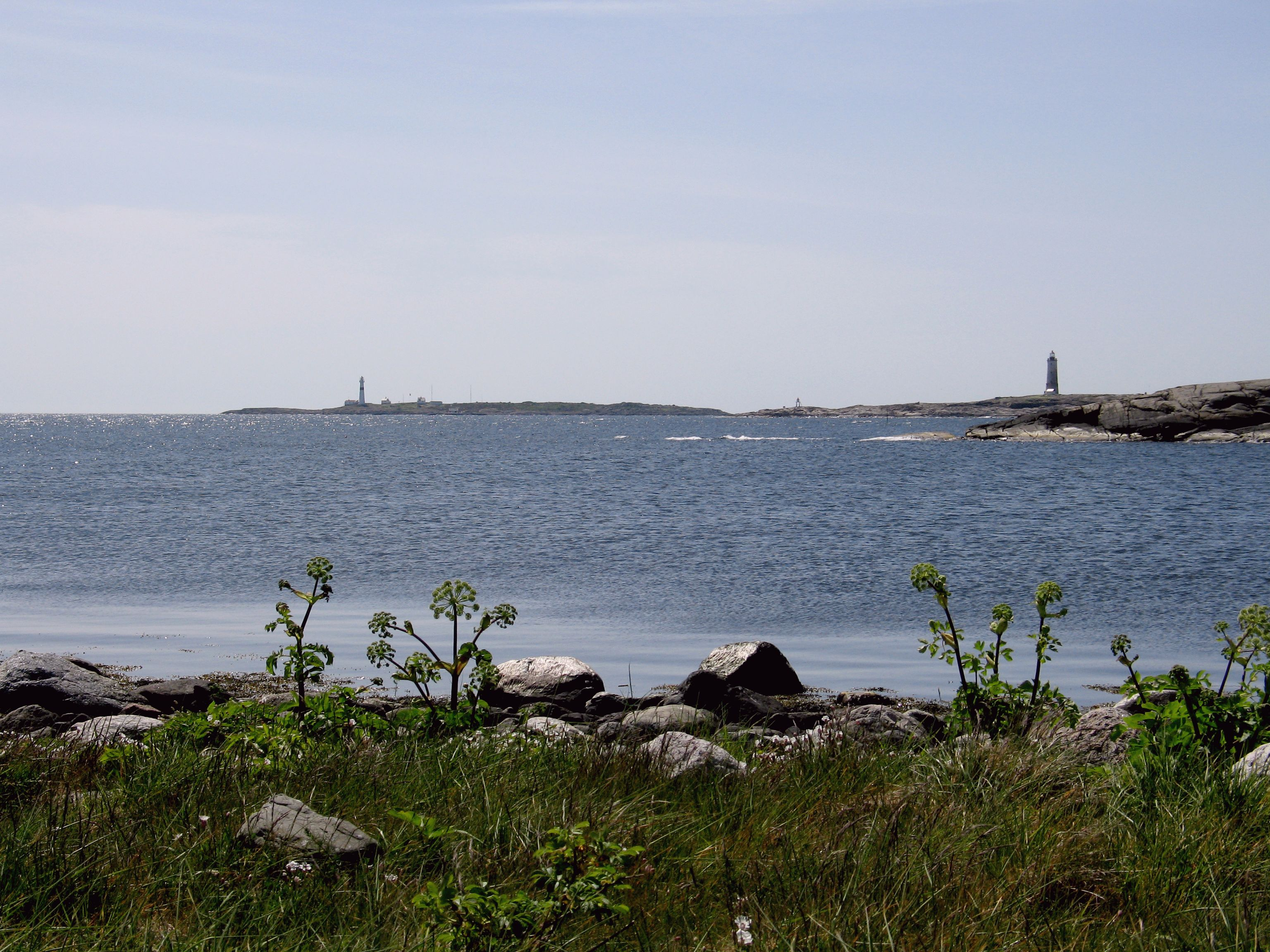
Two local Torungene lighthouses that inspired the coat of arms

== See also ==
- List of former municipalities of Norway
