= Aker Pusnes =

MacGregor Pusnes formerly known as Aker Pusnes, Aker Kværner Pusnes and Maritime Pusnes, established in 1875, is a designer and supplier of all types of deck machinery and mooring systems for marine and offshore applications. In addition, Aker Pusnes has developed and supplied bow loading and offloading systems for both simple and sophisticated operations offshore. The company is a subsidiary of Aker Solutions and located on Tromøya island near the city of Arendal in Agder county, Norway.

== History ==
- 1750: The first sailing ship was launched at Pusnes.
- 1891: The first steam driven winch was delivered.
- 1960: The last ship was launched at Pusnes.
- 1978: Introduced the first advanced bow loading system in the North Sea and later worldwide.
- 1985: Manufactured the mooring system for the world’s largest crane vessel, Micoperi 7000.
- 1994: Mooring winches and fairleads for the Troll B Platform, the world’s largest floating concrete platform.
- 1995: Mooring and fairleads systems, turning/locking and bearing systems, as well as offloading system to the world's largest Floating Production Storage and Offloading (FPSO), Åsgard A.
- 1997: Development/Introduction of the RamWinch. On-Vessel Mooring Equipment designed as an alternative to conventional rotating winches.
- 1997/99: Developed electric deck machinery based on frequency (AC) drive.
- 2003: Since 1997 RamWinches have been delivered to 10 different offshore production vessels, resulting in more than 100 RamWinch units. Delivered more than 900 Emergency Towing Systems (ETS).
- 2014: Pusnes was acquired by Cargotec for approximately EUR 180 million, and became part of MacGregor

Since 1985 Pusnes has delivered more than 1200 Ship-sets of Hydraulic Deck Machinery to vessels worldwide.
