= Hisøy (island) =

Lake in Agder, Norway

Hisøy Hisøen (historic)
- Interactive map of the island

Geography
- Location: Agder, Norway
- Coordinates: 58.44071°N 8.75302°E
- Area: 8.1 km^{2} (3.1 sq mi)
- Length: 4.5 km (2.8 mi)
- Width: 3.75 km (2.33 mi)
- Highest elevation: 99 m (325 ft)

Administration
- Norway
- County: Agder
- Municipality: Arendal Municipality

Demographics
- Population: 4450 (2015)
- Pop. density: 550/km^{2} (1420/sq mi)

Hisøy is an island in Agder county, Norway. The island has been part of Arendal Municipality since 1992. The main village areas on the island are Kolbjørnsvik, His, Slåbervig, and Sandviga. The village of Kolbjørnsvik is located across the harbor from the town of Arendal. There are two bridges that connect Hisøy to the mainland: the Strøm Bridge on the northwest side of the island and the Vippa Bridge on the southwest side of the island. In 2015, the island was home to about 4,450 people giving it a population density of about 550 inhabitants per square kilometre (1,400/sq mi).

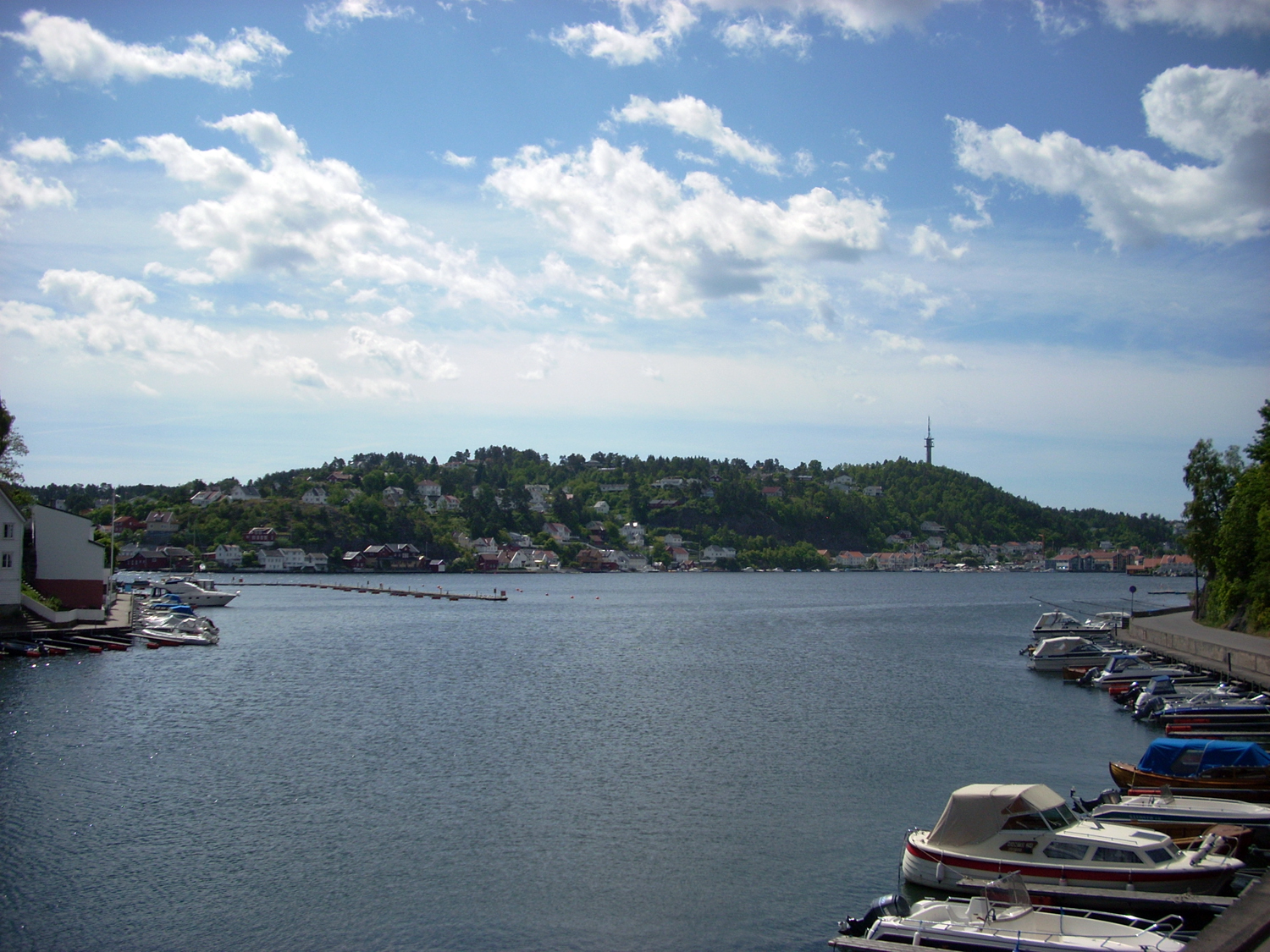
View of Hisøya from Arendal city centre

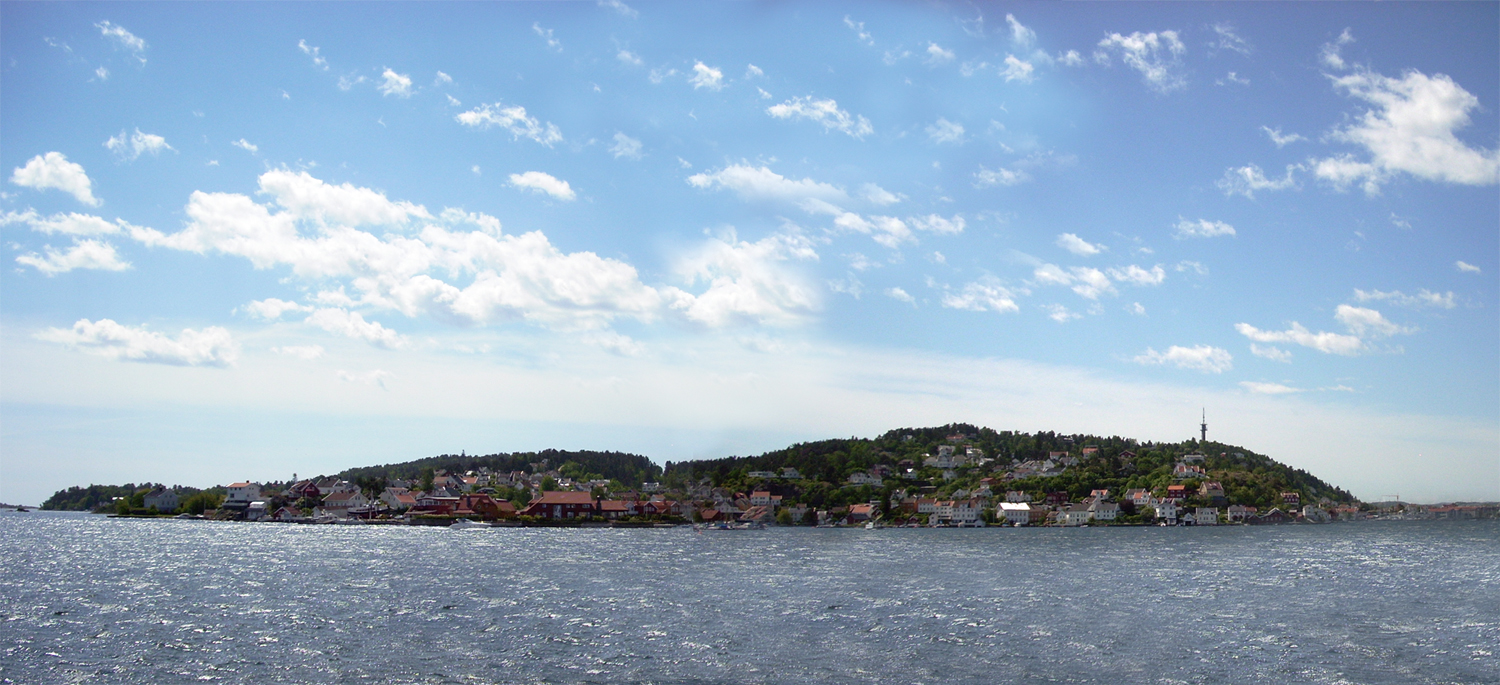
Alternate view of Hisøya

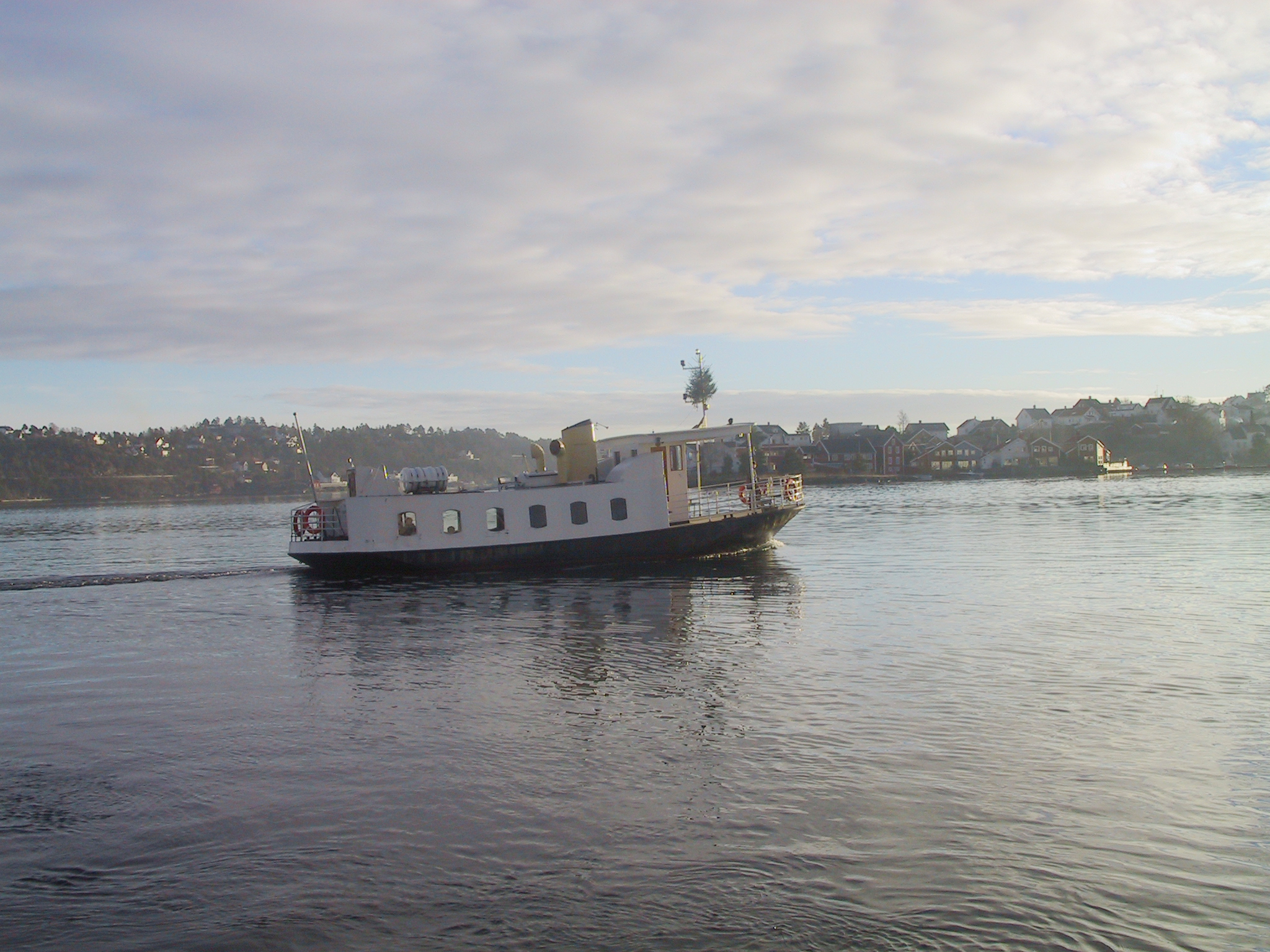
The boat "Kolbjørn" in its route between Arendal and Hisøy

The 8.1-square-kilometre (3.1 sq mi) island lies along the Skagerrak coast of southeastern Norway. Hisøy is separated from the mainland to the northwest by the river Nidelva. The island of Tromøya lies to the northeast, separated from Hisøy by the Galtesundet strait. The small islands of Ærøya, Havsøya, and Merdø lie just to the southeast of Hisøy. The highest point on Hisøy is the 99-metre (325 ft) tall hill on the edge of Kolbjørnsvik.

== History ==
The island was historically part of the large prestegjeld of Øyestad. The boat "Kolbjørn" provided transportation across the harbor for over 100 years. In 1881, Hisøy and several surrounding islands were separated to form the new Hisøy Municipality. This municipality existed from 1881 until 1992 when it was merged into Arendal Municipality.

=== Name ===
The island (originally the parish) is named Hisøy (or Hisøen) after the old His farm (Old Norse: Hís) since this is where the Hisøy Church is located. The first element, his, means "the cut" (probably referring to how the river Nidelva turns near the island). The last element is øy or øen which means "island".

== See also ==
- List of islands of Norway
