= Arendal (town) =

Town/city in Agder, Norway

- Town/City
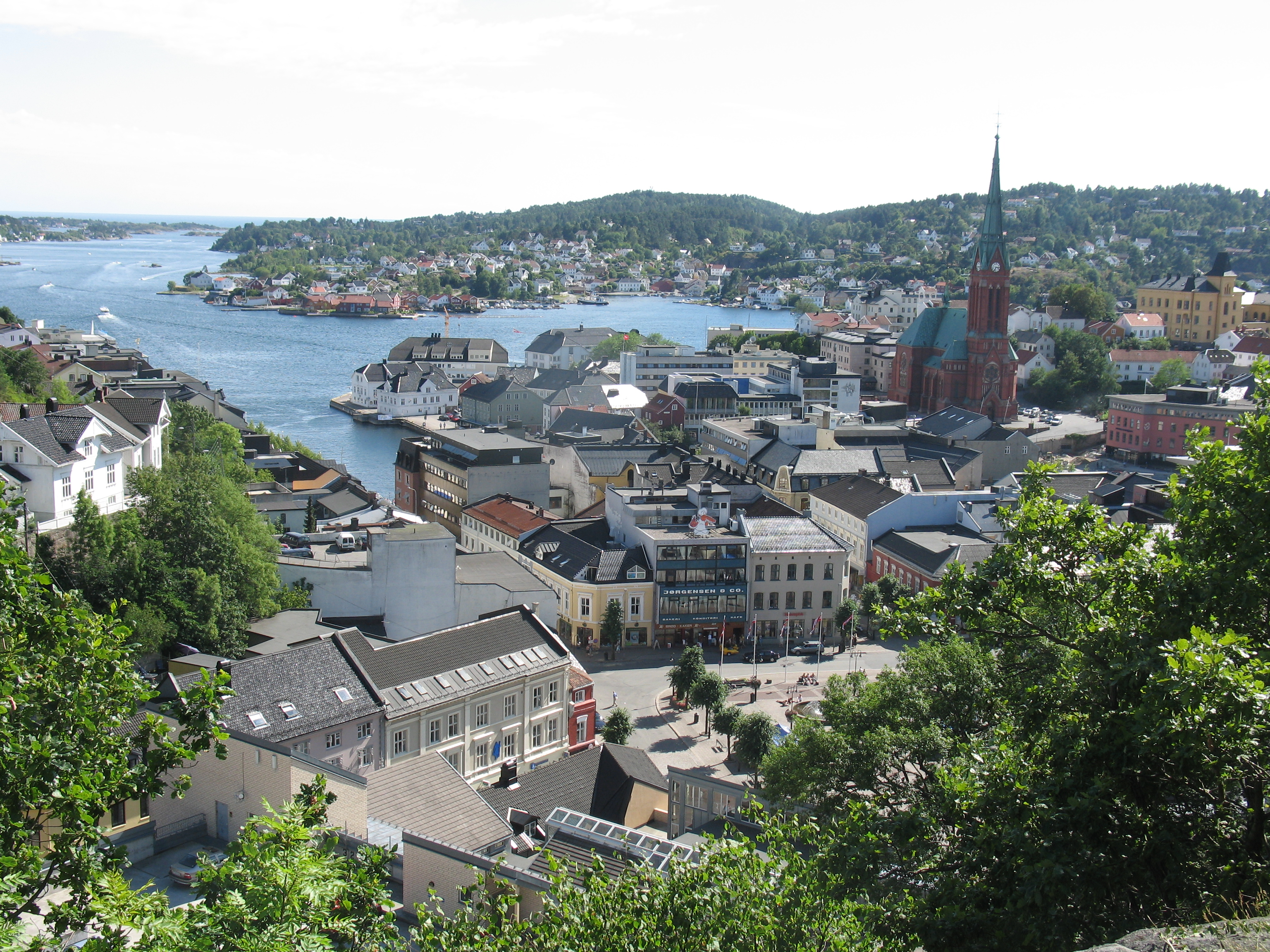
- View of the city centre

- Coat of arms
- Interactive map of Arendal
- Coordinates: 58.46151°N 8.77253°E
- Country: Norway
- Region: Southern Norway
- County: Agder
- District: Østre Agder
- Municipalities: Arendal Municipality (and Grimstad Municipality)
- Established as
- Ladested: 1610
- Kjøpstad: 1723

Area
  - Total: 32.07 km^{2} (12.38 sq mi)
- Elevation: 18 m (59 ft)

Population (2025)
  - Total: 45,601
  - Density: 1,422/km^{2} (3,680/sq mi)
- Time zone: UTC+01:00 (CET)
  - Summer (DST): UTC+02:00 (CEST)
- Post Code: 4836 Arendal

Arendal (Urban East Norwegian pronunciation: [ˈɑ̂ːɳɖɑːɫ]) is a city in Agder county, Norway. The city is the administrative centre of Arendal Municipality and the seat of the County Governor of Agder. The city also includes a small area in the neighbouring Grimstad Municipality as well. In Norway, Arendal is considered a by which can be translated as either a "town" or "city" in English.

The 32.07-square-kilometre (7,920-acre) city has a population (2025) of 45,601 and a population density of 1,422 inhabitants per square kilometre (3,680/sq mi). The urban area of the city does cross municipal boundaries due to its growth and conurbation over the years. In 2025, 4.41 square kilometres (1,090 acres) of the city with 6,376 residents were located in neighbouring Grimstad Municipality. This area was mostly north of the Fevik area in Grimstad, south of the city centre.

The offices of UNEP/GRID-Arendal are located in the town of Arendal. There are several churches in the city of Arendal including Trinity Church, Bjorbekk Church, Barbu Church and Stokken Church.

== History ==
The village of Arendal was established in the middle of the 16th century, and was then called Den Galeste Uggu. Initially, it had no formal town status. It was part of the prestegjeld of Øyestad going back for centuries. In 1610, the village was declared a ladested, a port of loading with special trading rights. The village sat at the mouth of the river Nidelva and timber was floated down the river from the vast inland forests and it was loaded onto boats and shipped elsewhere at Arendal.

When the town of Christianssand was founded by King Christian IV in 1641, he granted those citizens a monopoly on all trade in Nedenæs and Lister og Mandal counties (including the area of Arendal). This grant, intended to subsidise Christianssand and its fortifications, placed existing towns and ports in those counties in a difficult position. Both towns and the peasants in the rural countryside protested the hardships this caused. As a result, Arendal received royal permission in 1622 to continue as a loading-place for timber until a means could be found to transfer its trade to Christianssand, but Arendal had to pay a special tax of 750 riksdaler each year for this special privilege.

The town of Arendal was given kjøpstad privileges on 1 May 1723, giving it full "town status" along with all the trading privileges as other towns. However the peasants in the surrounding district, who by law were to sell their goods only at Arendal, continued to smuggle their goods out on cutters and sell them in Denmark, in the Baltic, and in Britain.

This continued until 1735, when some laws were changed and that, combined with the Danish imposition of a monopoly on grain imports, caused great poverty and starvation among the peasants in the surrounding districts, leading to several famous rebellions.

As a result of the rebellions, the age of privileges for towns like Christianssand and Arendal came to an apparent end in 1768 by royal proclamation. But the problems did not end then; a farmer, Christian Jensen Lofthuus, in nearby Vestre Moland, led a rebellion in 1786 which resulted in the government actually remedying some of the most repressive trade policies, but Lofthuus died in prison. The charges against Lofthuus were that he dealt in grain and other commodities to the detriment of Arendal's privileges.

Shipping, shipbuilding, and timber trade as well as mining and ironworks were important branches of industry in Nedenæs county for many centuries, especially in the Arendal region. Frequent contacts with the world abroad put their mark on its culture and traditions. In 1880, it was the country's biggest port in terms of tonnage handled. At the end of the 19th century Arendal was recognised as a major shipping centre with many wealthy shipowners. However, this came to an end following the 1886 Arendal crash, in which Axel Nicolai Herlofson had defrauded many bank customers in the city, leading to bankruptcies and extreme unemployment.

A ferry service across the harbor basin to Kolbjørnsvik was started by Kolbjørn in 1893 with SF Colbjørn. The service still runs, since 1980 with MF Kolbjørn III.

Around the turn of the twentieth century, when thousands of Norwegians sought to take advantage of the more stable economic climate of the United States by emigrating from a ship named Thomas Gundersen, many of those from Arendal took their economic traditions with them. In New York City and the surrounding areas, a great deal of Americans who claim Norwegian ancestry can trace their roots to Arendal, as a great deal of Norwegian sailors, trimmers, shipbuilders and carpenters from Arendal settled in areas of New York such as Brooklyn, Port Richmond (Staten Island), and several industrial centres in northern New Jersey such as Jersey City, Bayonne, Perth Amboy, and Elizabeth. In 1939, Arendal had the 4th largest Norwegian tanker fleet; only Oslo, Bergen, and Stavanger were larger.

During the German invasion of Norway on 9 April 1940, Arendal was captured by the German torpedo boat Greif.

Today, the town has small boat manufacturing, mechanical industry, electronics industry, as well as one of the world's largest silicon carbide refining plants.

=== Municipal history ===
The town of Arendal was established as a municipality on 1 January 1838 (see formannskapsdistrikt law). On 1 January 1875, a small area with 22 inhabitants was transferred from the town to the neighbouring Østre Moland Municipality and another small area with 52 residents was transferred to the neighbouring Øiestad Municipality.

On 1 January 1902, the rural Barbu Municipality (population: 6,787) was merged into Arendal Municipality. In 1944, a small area of Moland Municipality with a population of 21 inhabitants was transferred to Arendal as well. On 1 January 1992, Arendal Municipality was vastly expanded when the neighbouring rural municipalities of Hisøy (pop: 4,026), Moland (pop: 8,148), Tromøy (pop: 4,711), and Øyestad (pop: 8,679) were all merged with the town of Arendal which had a population of 12,478, bringing the total population of the Arendal Municipality to 38,042.

=== Name ===
The Old Norse form of the name was probably Arnardalr. The first element is the genitive case of ǫrn which means "eagle" and the last element is dalr which means "valley" or "dale", thus meaning the "eagle valley".

== Townscape ==
In the middle of the town centre is an area with wooden houses dating back to the 17th century. This area is called Tyholmen, and is what is left of buildings from before the 19th century. The inner harbour of Arendal is called "Pollen", where the fish market, pubs, and restaurants are located. Trinity Church dominates the skyline of this area.

== See also ==
- List of towns and cities in Norway
