= Tromøy =

Tromøy may refer to:

== Places ==
- Tromøy (island), an island in Arendal Municipality in Agder county, Norway
- Tromøy Municipality, a former municipality in the old Aust-Agder county, Norway
- Tromøy Church, a church in Arendal Municipality in Agder county, Norway
- Tromøy Bridge, a bridge in Arendal Municipality in Agder county, Norway
