= Tromøy Municipality =

Former municipality in Aust-Agder, Norway

Tromøy Municipality Tromøy kommune
- Former municipality
- Tromø herred (historic name)
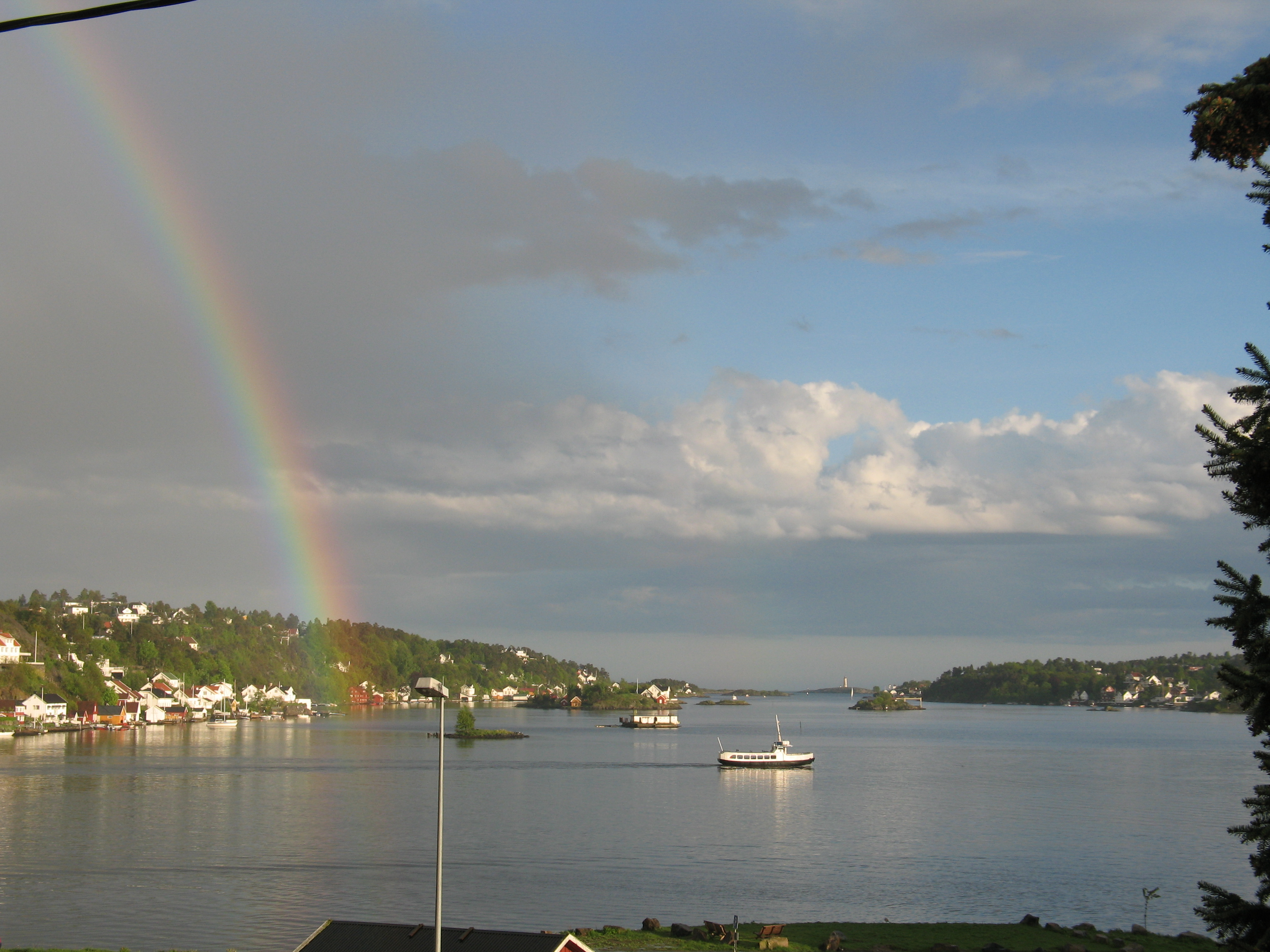
- View of Tromøy

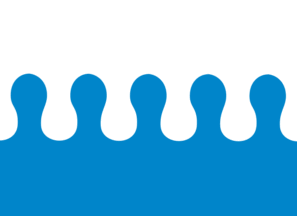
- Flag Coat of arms
- Nickname: The pearl of Southern Norway
- Aust-Agder within Norway

- Tromøy within Aust-Agder
- Coordinates: 58°26′59″N 08°51′51″E
- Country: Norway
- County: Aust-Agder
- District: Østre Agder
- Established: 1 May 1878
  - Preceded by: Østre Moland Municipality
- Disestablished: 1 Jan 1992
  - Succeeded by: Arendal Municipality
- Administrative centre: Brekka

Government
  - Mayor (1987–1991): Tove Stiansen (Ap)

Area
  - Total: 29.9 km^{2} (11.5 sq mi)
  - Rank: #443 in Norway
- Highest elevation: 95.8 m (314 ft)

Population (1991)
  - Total: 4,711
  - Rank: #208 in Norway
  - Density: 157.6/km^{2} (408/sq mi)
  - Change (10 years): ▲ +10.7%
- Demonym: Tromøyfolk

Official language
  - Norwegian form: Bokmål
- Time zone: UTC+01:00 (CET)
  - Summer (DST): UTC+02:00 (CEST)
- ISO 3166 code: NO-0921

Tromøy is a former municipality in the old Aust-Agder county, Norway. The 29.9-square-kilometre (11.5 sq mi) municipality existed from 1878 until its dissolution in 1992. The area is now part of Arendal Municipality in the traditional district of Østre Agder in Agder county. The administrative centre was the village of Brekka, where the historic Tromøy Church is located. Some of the main villages in Tromøy were Færvik, Brekka, Brattekleiv, Sandnes, Revesand, and Pusnes. The municipality was connected to the mainland by the Tromøy Bridge, the only road connection to Tromøya. The other islands of Tromøy were only accessible by boat.

Prior to its dissolution in 1991, the 29.9-square-kilometre (11.5 sq mi) municipality was the 443rd largest by area out of the 448 municipalities in Norway. Tromøy Municipality was the 208th most populous municipality in Norway with a population of about 4,711. The municipality's population density was 157.6 inhabitants per square kilometre (408/sq mi) and its population had increased by 10.7% over the previous 10-year period.

== General information ==
The municipality of Tromøy was established on 1 May 1878 when Østre Moland Municipality was divided into three:

- the southeastern district (population: 2,320) became the new Tromøy Municipality
- the southwestern district (population: 4,874) became the new Barbu Municipality
- the northern district (population: 2,524) continued as a smaller Østre Moland Municipality

On 1 January 1992, Tromøy Municipality was dissolved and the following areas were merged to form an enlarged Arendal Municipality:

- all of Tromøy Municipality (population: 4,711)
- all of Arendal Municipality (population: 12,478)
- all of Hisøy Municipality (population: 4,026)
- all of Moland Municipality (population: 8,148)
- all of Øyestad Municipality (population: 8,679)

=== Name ===
The municipality (originally the parish) is named after the island of Tromøya (Old Norse: Þruma). The first element is likely derived from the word þrǫmr which means "rim", "edge", or "border". The last element is øy which means "island". Historically, the name of the municipality was spelled Tromø.

On 3 November 1917, a royal resolution changed the spelling of the name of the municipality to Tromøy. The letter y was added to the end of the word to "Norwegianize" the name (ø is the Danish word for "island" and øy is the Norwegian word).

=== Coat of arms ===
The coat of arms was granted on 23 August 1985 and in use until the municipal merger on 1 January 1992. The official blazon is "Per fess nebuly argent and azure" (Norwegian: Delt av sølv og blått ved skysnitt). This means the arms have a field (background) that is divided in half horizontally with a nebuly line. The top part has a tincture of argent which means it is commonly colored white, but if it is made out of metal, then silver is used. The bottom part is colored blue. The design is meant to mimic the coastline near the village of Brekka, which is characterised by large rounded boulders protruding out into the sea. This landscape dates back to the Ice Age and was used to model the division line in the coat of arms. The arms are also canting since the name of the municipality is derived from the word "Trom" (Old Norse: Þroma) which means "edge" or "rim", referring to the division line on the arms and the boulders along the sea. The arms were designed by Anne Marie Falck.

=== Churches ===
The Church of Norway had one parish (sokn) within Tromøy Municipality. At the time of the municipal dissolution, it was part of the Tromøy prestegjeld and the Aust-Nedenes prosti (deanery) in the Diocese of Agder.

Churches in Tromøy Municipality
Parish (sokn)	Church name	Location of the church	Year built
Tromøy	Tromøy Church	Brekka	c. 1150
Tromøy	Færvik Church	Færvik	1884

== Geography ==
The municipality encompassed all of the island of Tromøya as well as many smaller surrounding islands such as Merdø, Gjesøya, Skilsøy, and Tromlingene. The highest point in the municipality was the 95.8-metre (314 ft) tall mountain Vardåsen, just west of the village of Færvik. Moland Municipality was located to the north, the Skagerrak was located to the east and south, Hisøy Municipality was located to the southwest, and Arendal Municipality was located to the west.

== Government ==
While it existed, Tromøy Municipality was responsible for primary education (through 10th grade), outpatient health services, senior citizen services, welfare and other social services, zoning, economic development, and municipal roads and utilities. The municipality was governed by a municipal council of directly elected representatives. The mayor was indirectly elected by a vote of the municipal council. The municipality was under the jurisdiction of the Nedenes District Court and the Agder Court of Appeal.

=== Municipal council ===
The municipal council (Kommunestyre) of Tromøy Municipality was made up of 21 representatives that were elected to four year terms. The tables below show the historical composition of the council by political party.

Tromøy kommunestyre 1987–1991
Party name (in Norwegian)	Number of representatives
Labour Party (Arbeiderpartiet)	10
Conservative Party (Høyre)	6
Christian Democratic Party (Kristelig Folkeparti)	2
Socialist Left Party (Sosialistisk Venstreparti)	1
Liberal Party (Venstre)	2
Total number of members:	21
Note: On 1 January 1992, Tromøy Municipality became part of Arendal Municipality.

Tromøy kommunestyre 1983–1987
Party name (in Norwegian)	Number of representatives
Labour Party (Arbeiderpartiet)	8
Progress Party (Fremskrittspartiet)	1
Conservative Party (Høyre)	7
Christian Democratic Party (Kristelig Folkeparti)	3
Socialist Left Party (Sosialistisk Venstreparti)	1
Liberal Party (Venstre)	1
Total number of members:	21

Tromøy kommunestyre 1979–1983
Party name (in Norwegian)	Number of representatives
Labour Party (Arbeiderpartiet)	7
Conservative Party (Høyre)	8
Christian Democratic Party (Kristelig Folkeparti)	3
Centre Party (Senterpartiet)	1
Liberal Party (Venstre)	2
Total number of members:	21

Tromøy kommunestyre 1975–1979
Party name (in Norwegian)	Number of representatives
Labour Party (Arbeiderpartiet)	5
Conservative Party (Høyre)	5
Christian Democratic Party (Kristelig Folkeparti)	3
Joint list of the New People's Party (Nye Folkepartiet), Centre Party (Senterpartiet), and Liberal Party (Venstre)	4
Total number of members:	17

Tromøy kommunestyre 1971–1975
Party name (in Norwegian)	Number of representatives
Labour Party (Arbeiderpartiet)	7
Conservative Party (Høyre)	4
Christian Democratic Party (Kristelig Folkeparti)	3
Liberal Party (Venstre)	3
Total number of members:	17

Tromøy kommunestyre 1967–1971
Party name (in Norwegian)	Number of representatives
Labour Party (Arbeiderpartiet)	7
Conservative Party (Høyre)	4
Christian Democratic Party (Kristelig Folkeparti)	3
Liberal Party (Venstre)	3
Total number of members:	17

Tromøy kommunestyre 1963–1967
Party name (in Norwegian)	Number of representatives
Labour Party (Arbeiderpartiet)	8
Conservative Party (Høyre)	4
Christian Democratic Party (Kristelig Folkeparti)	2
Liberal Party (Venstre)	3
Total number of members:	17

Tromøy herredsstyre 1959–1963
Party name (in Norwegian)	Number of representatives
Labour Party (Arbeiderpartiet)	9
Conservative Party (Høyre)	4
Liberal Party (Venstre)	4
Total number of members:	17

Tromøy herredsstyre 1955–1959
Party name (in Norwegian)	Number of representatives
Labour Party (Arbeiderpartiet)	8
Conservative Party (Høyre)	5
Liberal Party (Venstre)	4
Total number of members:	17

Tromøy herredsstyre 1951–1955
Party name (in Norwegian)	Number of representatives
Labour Party (Arbeiderpartiet)	7
Conservative Party (Høyre)	4
Liberal Party (Venstre)	5
Total number of members:	16

Tromøy herredsstyre 1947–1951
Party name (in Norwegian)	Number of representatives
Labour Party (Arbeiderpartiet)	6
Conservative Party (Høyre)	5
Liberal Party (Venstre)	5
Total number of members:	16

Tromøy herredsstyre 1945–1947
Party name (in Norwegian)	Number of representatives
Labour Party (Arbeiderpartiet)	8
Conservative Party (Høyre)	5
Joint list of the Liberal Party (Venstre) and the Radical People's Party (Radikale Folkepartiet)	3
Total number of members:	16

Tromøy herredsstyre 1937–1941*
Party name (in Norwegian)	Number of representatives
Labour Party (Arbeiderpartiet)	6
Conservative Party (Høyre)	8
Liberal Party (Venstre)	2
Total number of members:	16
Note: Due to the German occupation of Norway during World War II, no elections were held for new municipal councils until after the war ended in 1945.

=== Mayors ===
The mayor (Norwegian: ordfører) of Tromøy Municipality was the political leader of the municipality and the chairperson of the municipal council. The following people have held this position:

- 1878–1901: O.B. Sørensen Bratteklev
- 1902–1904: Knut Kviledal
- 1905–1907: Hans Vilhelm Omholt
- 1908–1913: Thor Olsen
- 1914–1919: Harald Berthelsen
- 1919-1931: Søren Hans Smith Sørensen (H)
- 1932-1934: Christian Stray (V)
- 1934-1941: Søren Hans Smith Sørensen (H)
- 1941-1945: Johannes Mølbach (NS)
- 1945-1945: Søren Hans Smith Sørensen (H)
- 1946–1947: Peder Heien
- 1948–1955: Alv Kristiansen
- 1956-1959: Christian Stray (V)
- 1960–1963: Carl Alfredsen
- 1964–1967: Alv Kristiansen
- 1968–1969: Jens Lien
- 1970–1975: Arne Ramsvatn (V)
- 1975–1977: Tore Frich Jobsen (H)
- 1978–1979: Bjarne Ruud-Hansen
- 1979–1987: Leif Gerhard Andersen (H)
- 1987–1991: Tove Stiansen (Ap)

== Media gallery ==
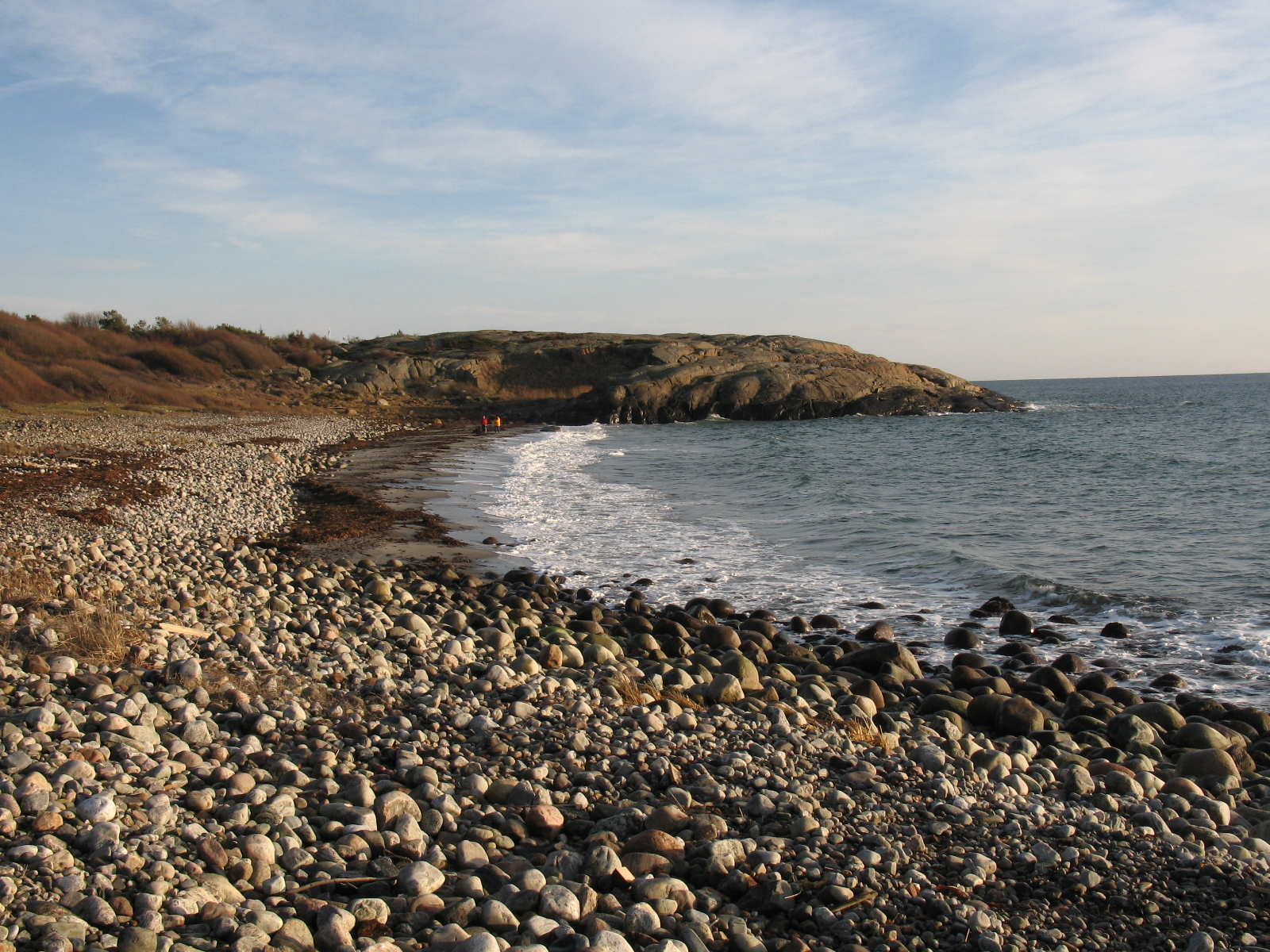
Spornes headland on Tromøya

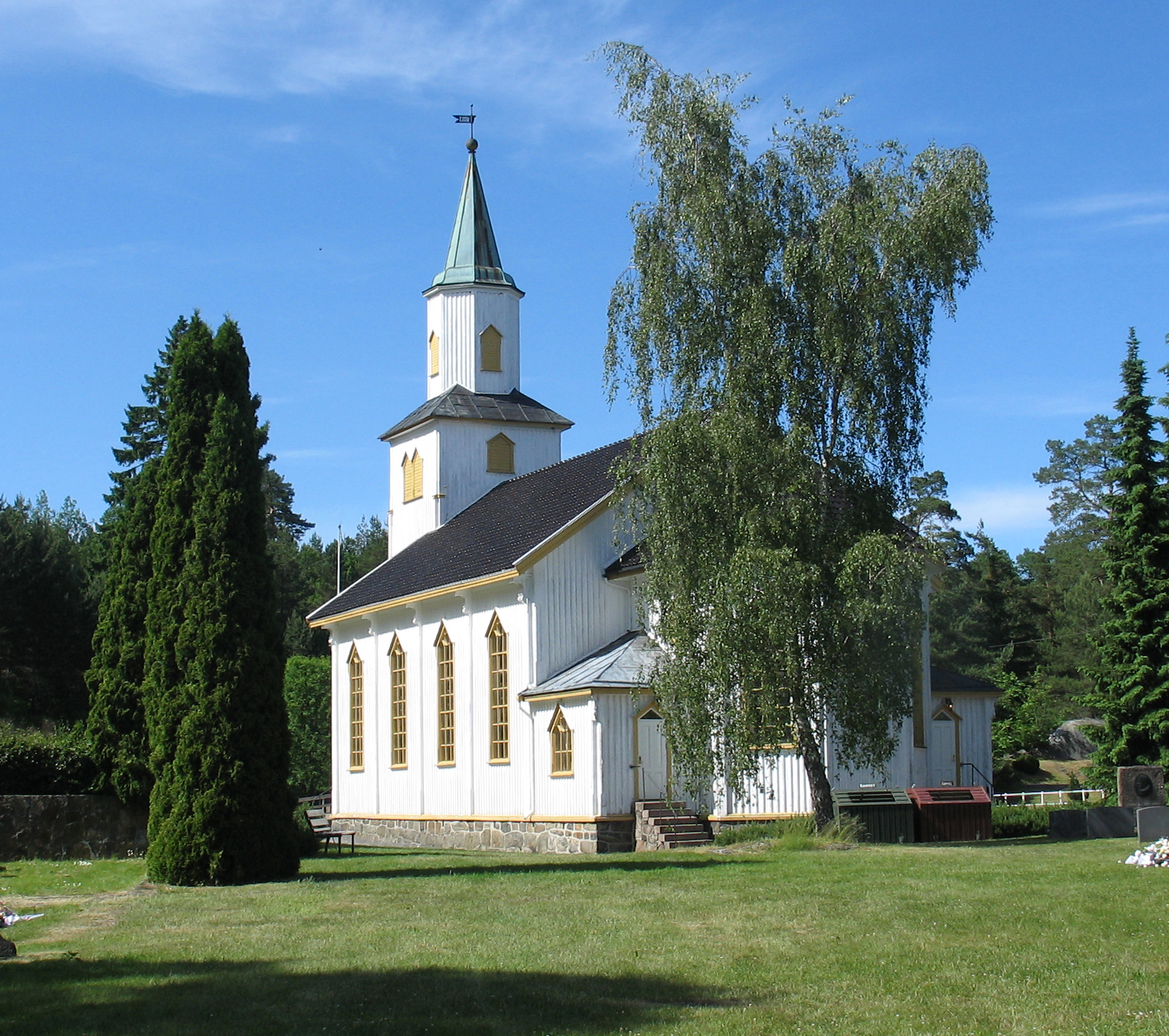
Færvik Church

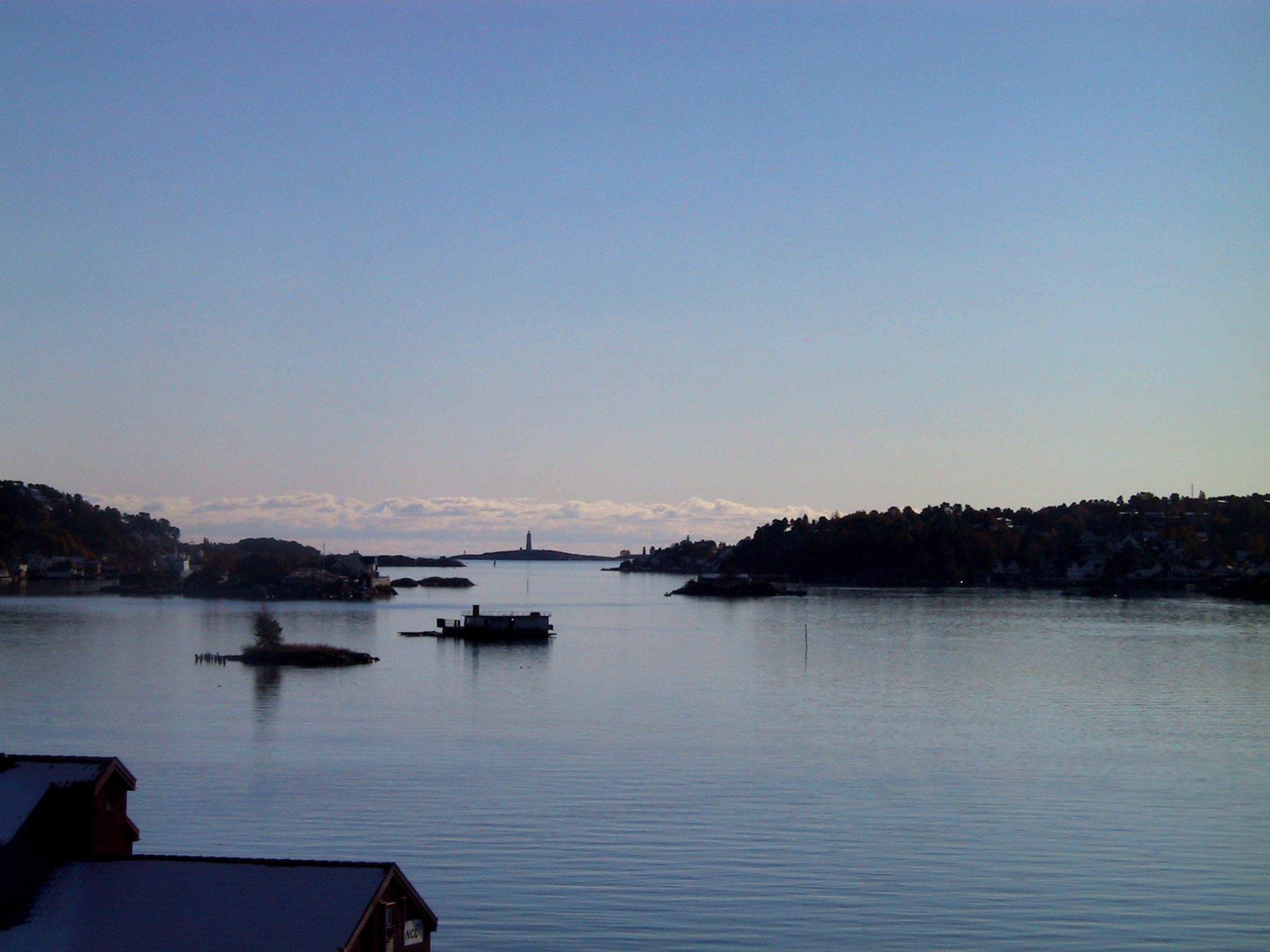
Lighthouse

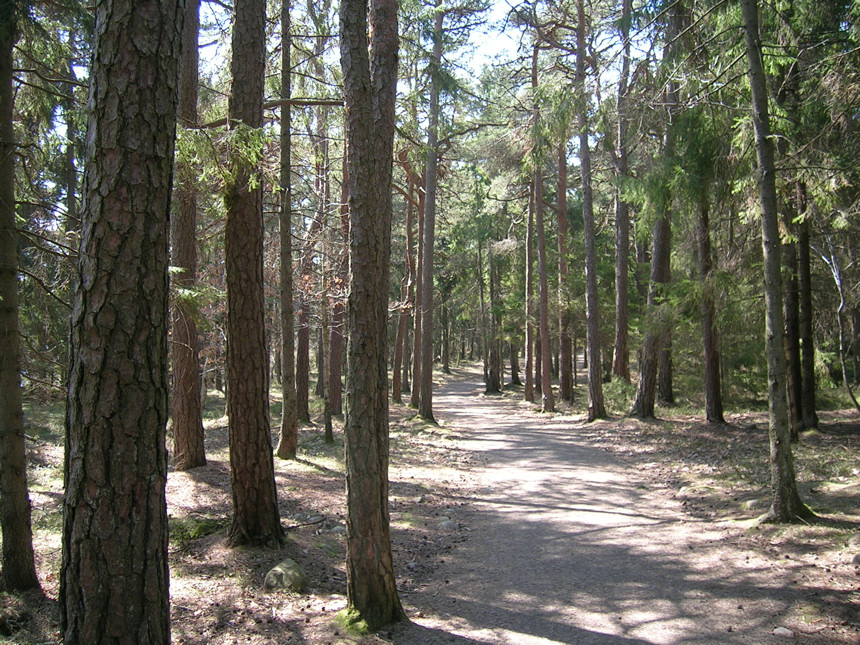
Hove Forest

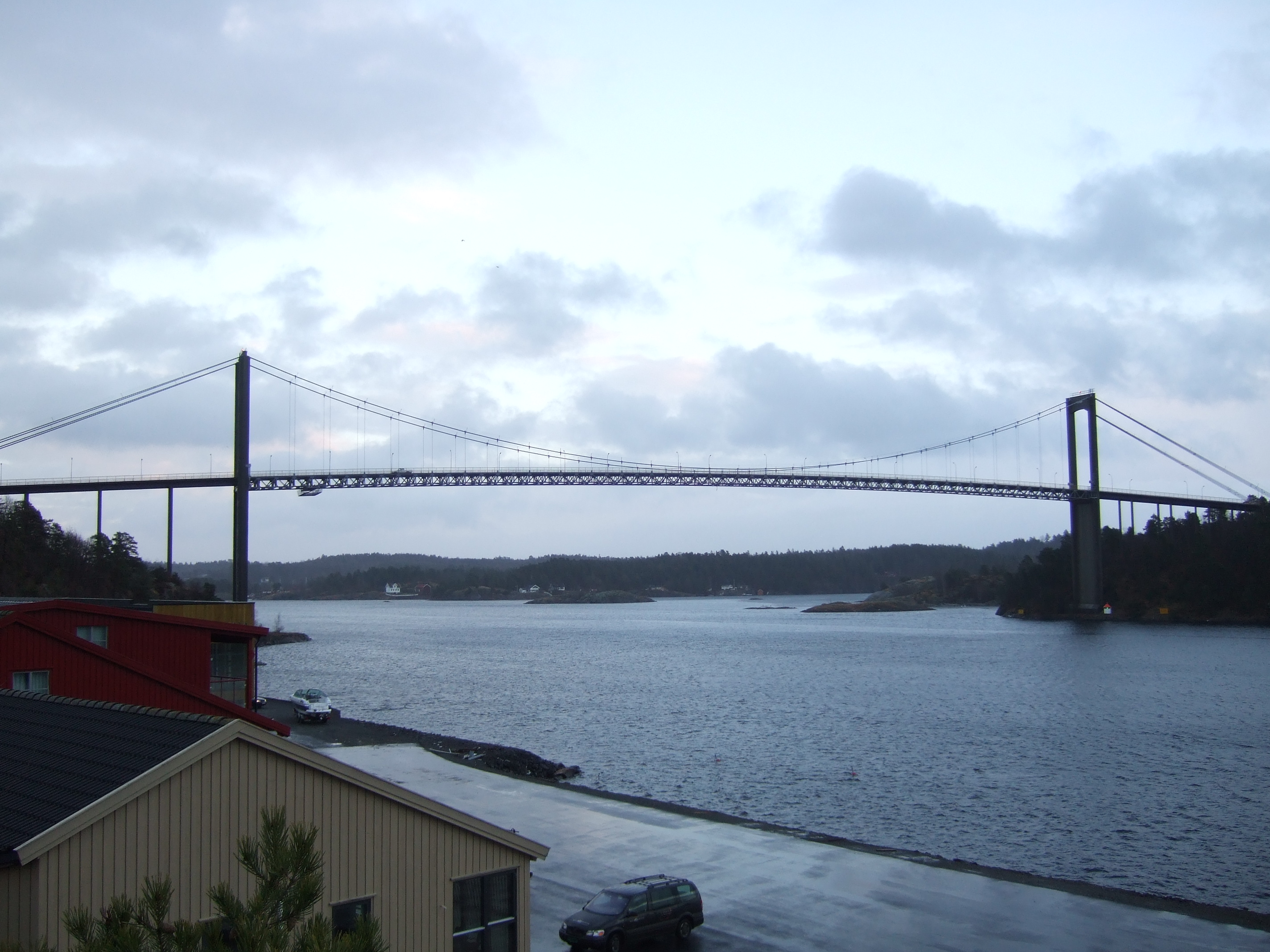
Tromøy bridge

== See also ==
- List of former municipalities of Norway
