= Færvik =

Village in Arendal Municipality, Norway

- Village
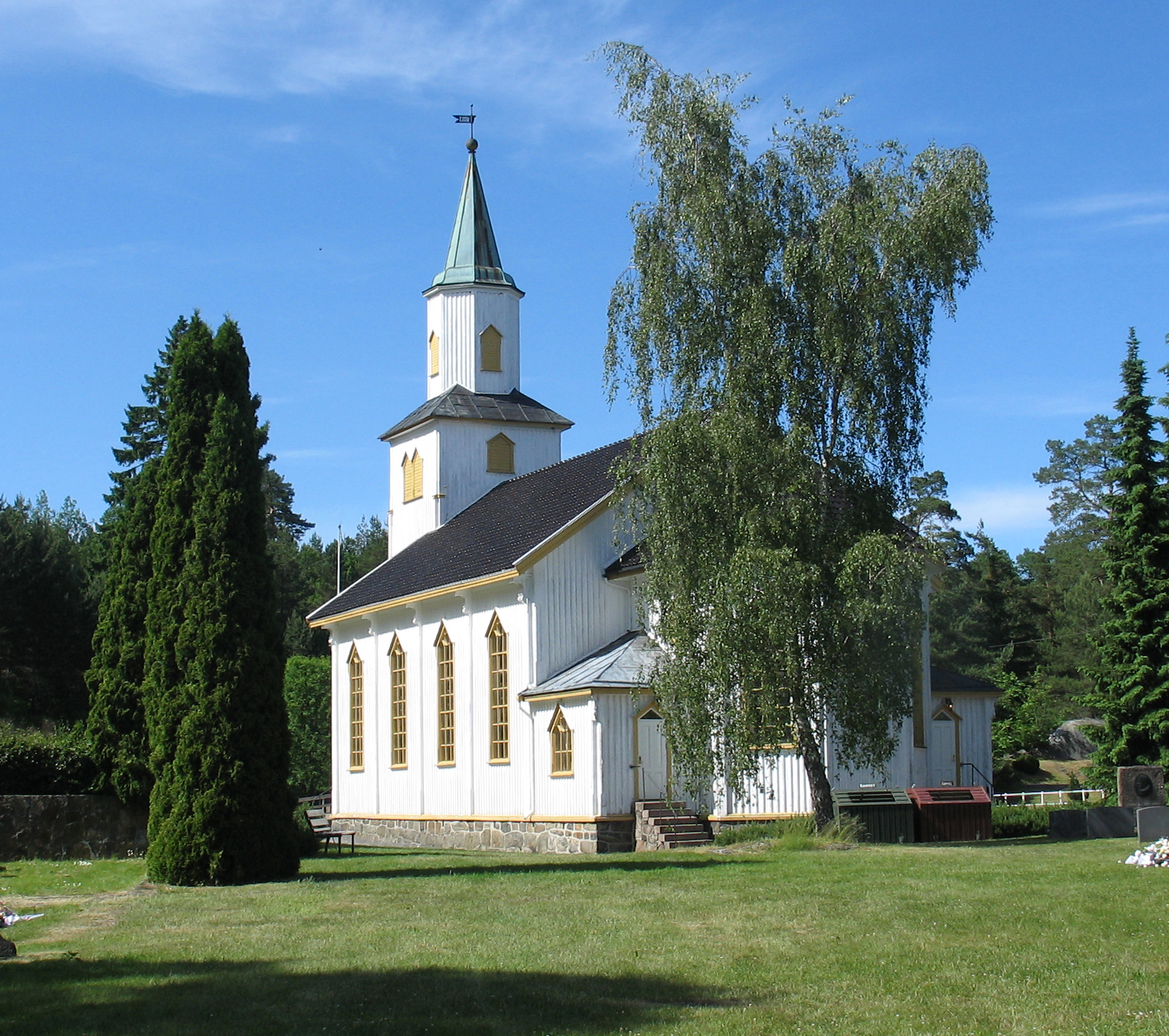
- View of the village church
- Interactive map of Færvik
- Coordinates: 58.4549°N 08.8166°E
- Country: Norway
- Region: Southern Norway
- County: Agder
- District: Østre Agder
- Municipality: Arendal Municipality
- Elevation: 1 m (3.3 ft)
- Time zone: UTC+01:00 (CET)
  - Summer (DST): UTC+02:00 (CEST)
- Post Code: 4818 Færvik

Færvik is a village in Arendal Municipality in Agder county, Norway. The village is located on the southwestern part of the island of Tromøya. It sits east of the villages of Pusnes and Brattekleiv and north of the village of Revesand. Færvik Church is located just southwest of the village. Færvik was the administrative centre of the old Tromøy Municipality from 1878 until 1992.
