= Brekka, Tromøya =

Village in Arendal Municipality, Norway

Brekka Brekke
- Village
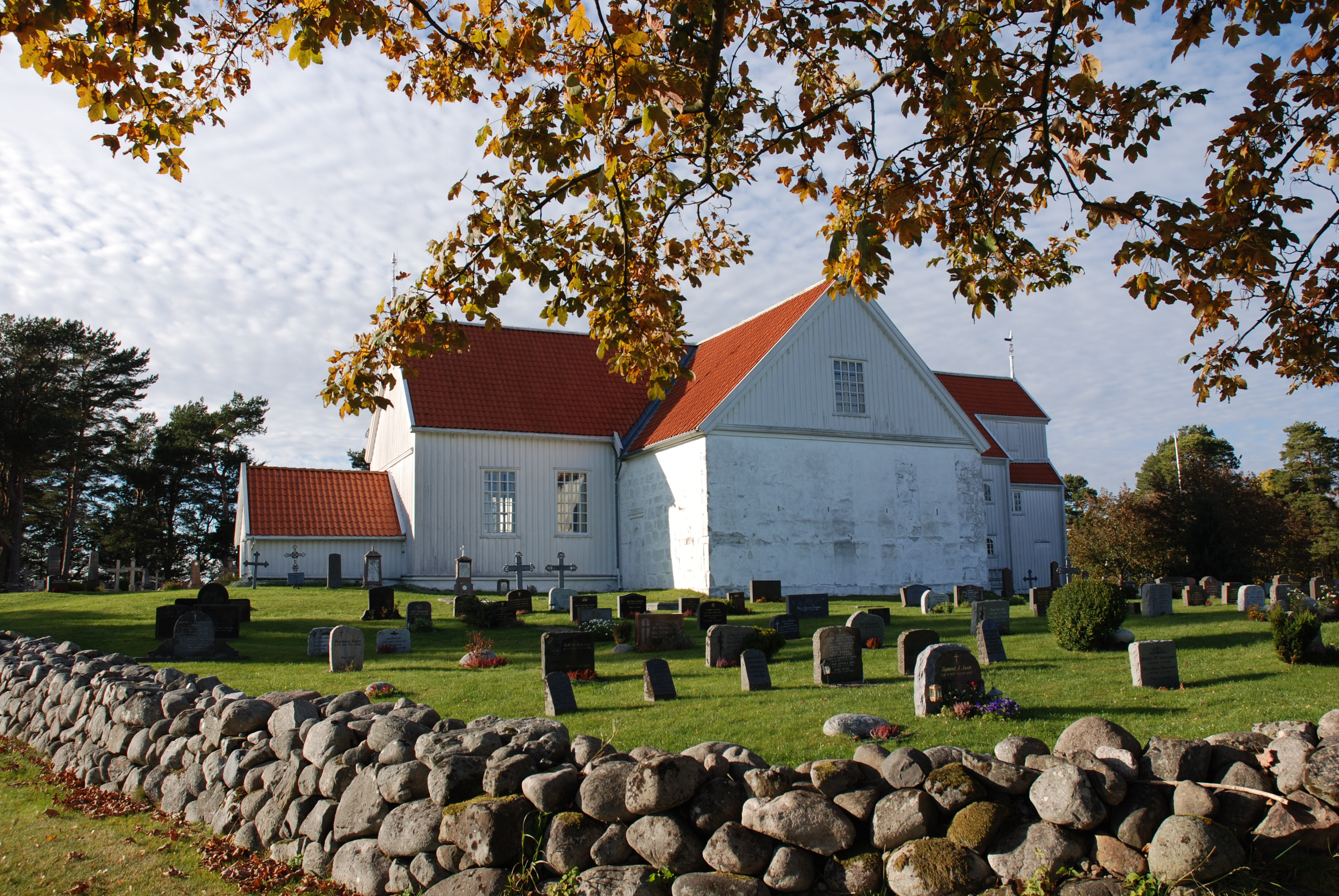
- View of the village church
- Interactive map of Brekka
- Coordinates: 58.4533°N 8.86956°E
- Country: Norway
- Region: Southern Norway
- County: Agder
- District: Østre Agder
- Municipality: Grimstad Municipality
- Elevation: 22 m (72 ft)
- Time zone: UTC+01:00 (CET)
  - Summer (DST): UTC+02:00 (CEST)
- Post Code: 4818 Færvik

Brekka is a village in Arendal Municipality in Agder county, Norway. The village is located on the southeastern shore of the island of Tromøya, about 3.5 kilometres (2.2 mi) south of the village of Kongshavn, about 4 kilometres (2.5 mi) east of the village of Færvik, and about 7 kilometres (4.3 mi) east of the town of Arendal. Tromøy Church is located in the village.
