= Brattekleiv =

Village in Arendal Municipality, Norway

Brattekleiv Bratteklev
- Village
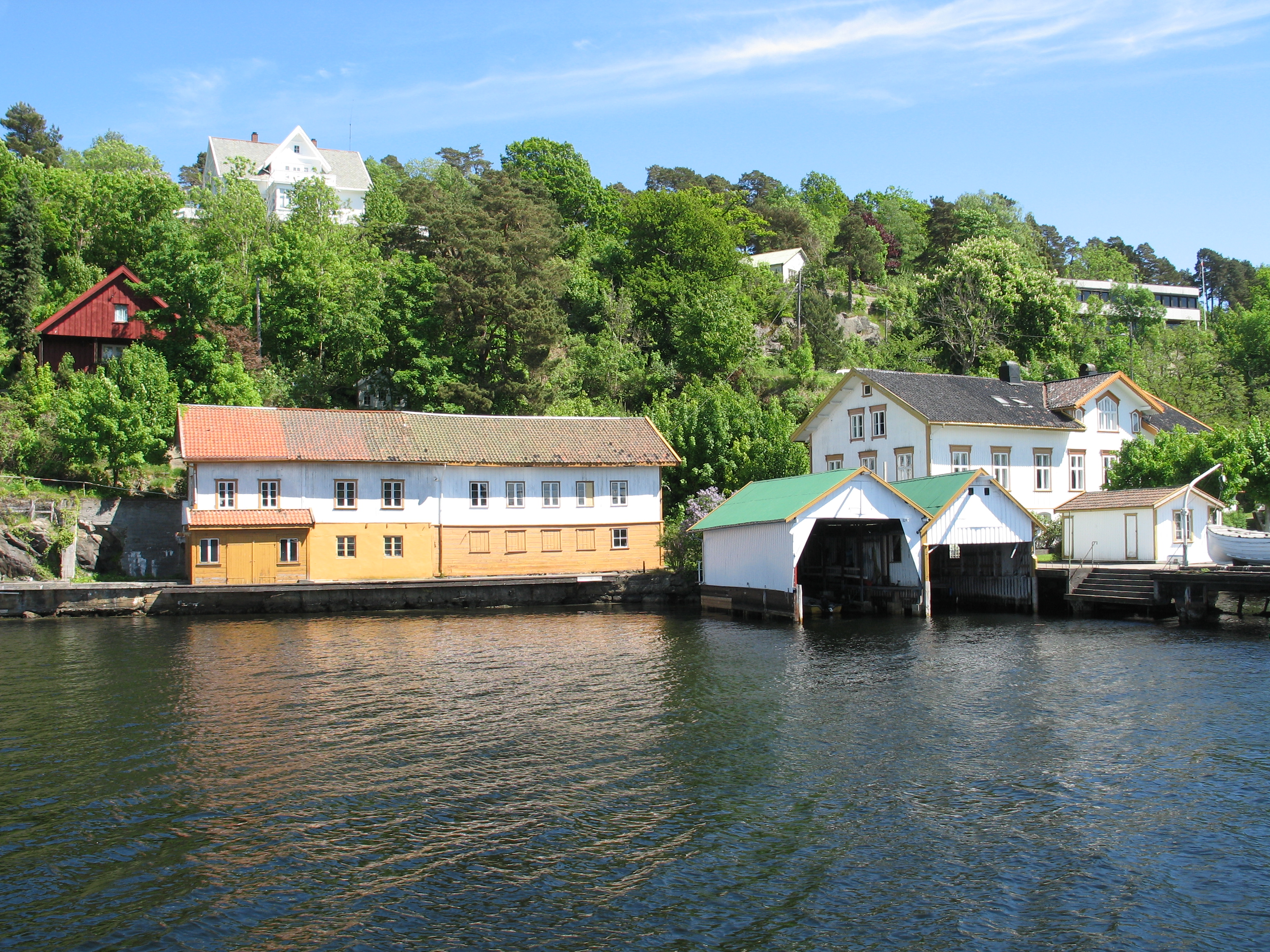
- View of the village
- Interactive map of Brattekleiv
- Coordinates: 58.45018°N 8.79202°E
- Country: Norway
- Region: Southern Norway
- County: Agder
- District: Østre Agder
- Municipality: Arendal Municipality
- Elevation: 38 m (125 ft)
- Time zone: UTC+01:00 (CET)
  - Summer (DST): UTC+02:00 (CEST)
- Post Code: 4818 Færvik

Brattekleiv is a village in Arendal Municipality in Agder county, Norway. The village is located along the Galtesundet strait on the southwestern shore of the island of Tromøya. The village lies about 1 kilometre (0.62 mi) southwest of the town of Arendal which is located across the strait. The smaller industrial village of Pusnes lies immediately north of Brattekleiv, the small village of Revesand lies just south of the village, and the village of Færvik lies a short distance to the east.
