= Færvik Church =

Church in Agder, Norway

- Færvik kirke
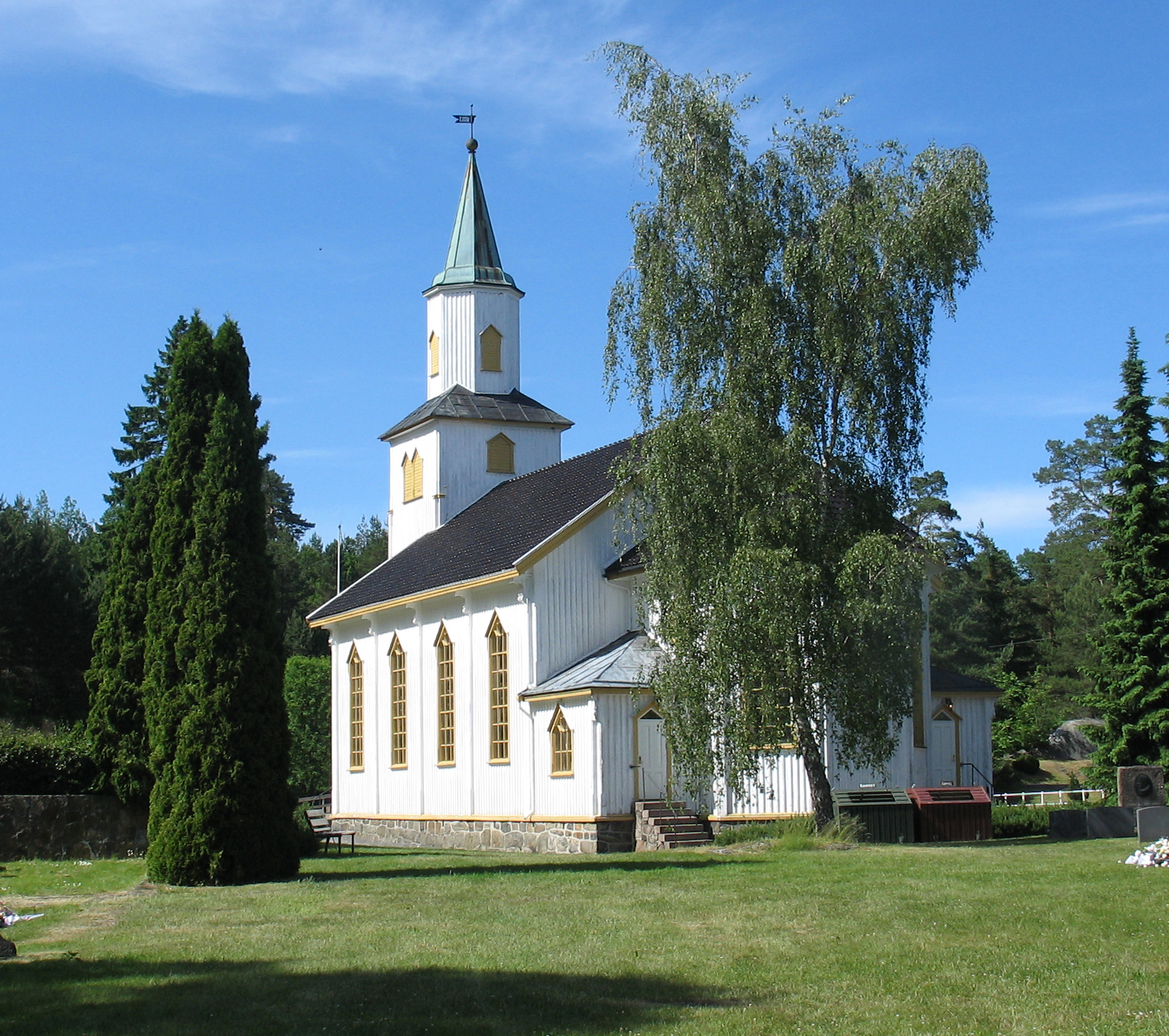
- View of the church
- Færvik Church
- 58.449927°N 08.81000°E
- Location: Arendal Municipality, Agder
- Country: Norway
- Denomination: Church of Norway
- Churchmanship: Evangelical Lutheran

History
- Status: Parish church
- Founded: 1884
- Consecrated: 28 May 1884

Architecture
- Functional status: Active
- Architect: J.C. Reuter
- Architectural type: Long church
- Style: Neo-Gothic
- Completed: 1884 (142 years ago)

Specifications
- Capacity: 490
- Materials: Wood

Administration
- Diocese: Agder og Telemark
- Deanery: Arendal prosti
- Parish: Tromøy
- Norwegian Cultural Heritage Site
- Type: Church
- Status: Listed
- ID: 84219

Færvik Church (Norwegian: Færvik kirke) is a parish church of the Church of Norway in Arendal Municipality in Agder county, Norway. It is located in the village of Færvik on the island of Tromøy. It is one of the churches for the Tromøy parish which is part of the Arendal prosti (deanery) in the Diocese of Agder og Telemark. The white, wooden, neo-Gothic church was built in a long church design in 1884 using plans drawn up by the architect Johan Christoff Friedrich Reuter. The church seats about 490 people.

== History ==
Tromøy Church has served the island of Tromøy since the Middle Ages, but in the 19th century the population increased so much that there was a demand for a new church on the western part of the island near the village of Færvik. Funds for the church were donated by the shipowner and mayor of Tromøy Municipality, Mr. O.B. Sørensen and his wife. The church was based on the designs the architect Johan Christoff Friedrich Reuter used for Stokken Church. (The same drawings were also used in the construction of Bjorbekk Church). Construction began on the new church the laying of the foundation wall in 1879 and the building was completed in 1883. The church was consecrated by the bishop on 28 May 1884.

== Media gallery ==
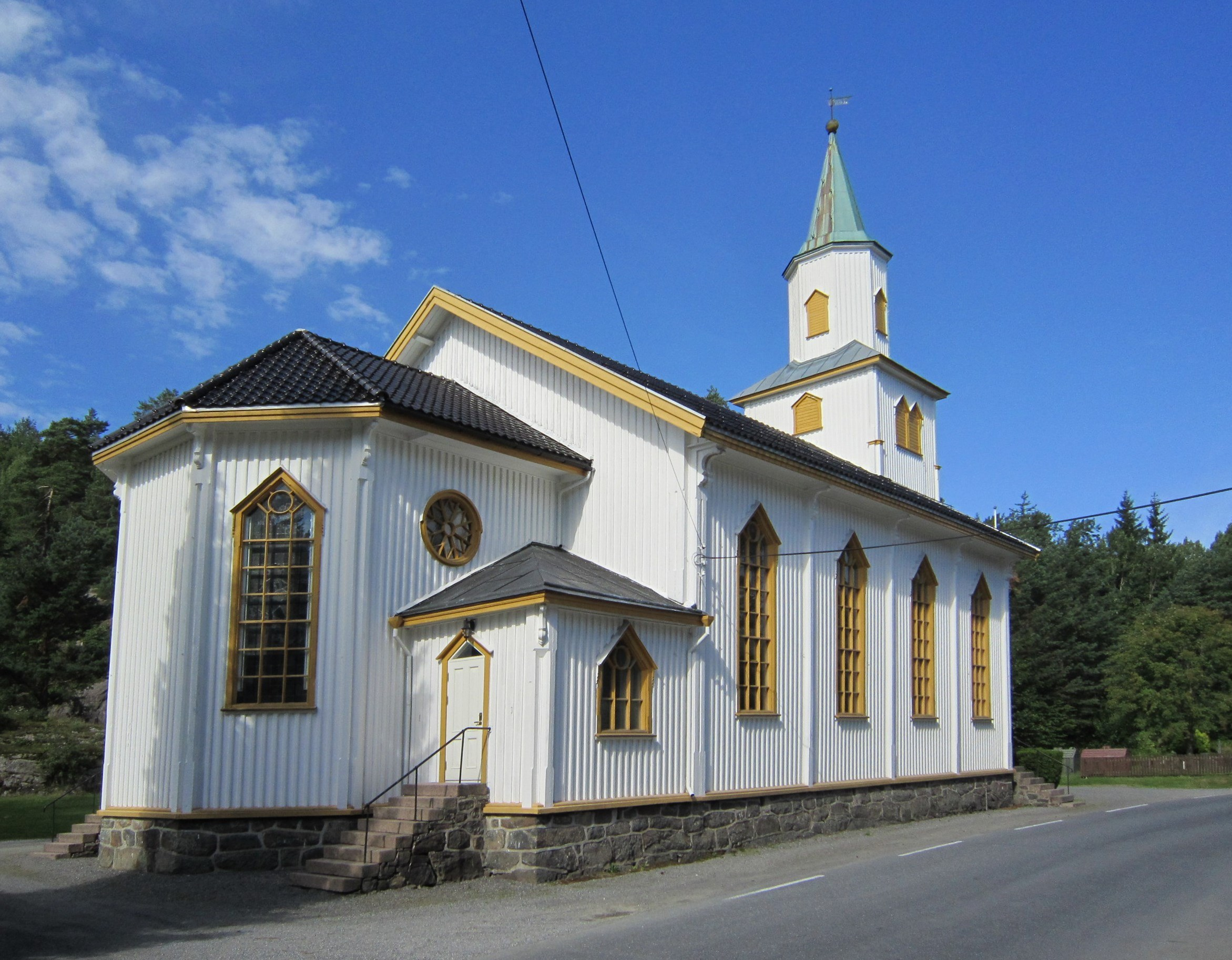

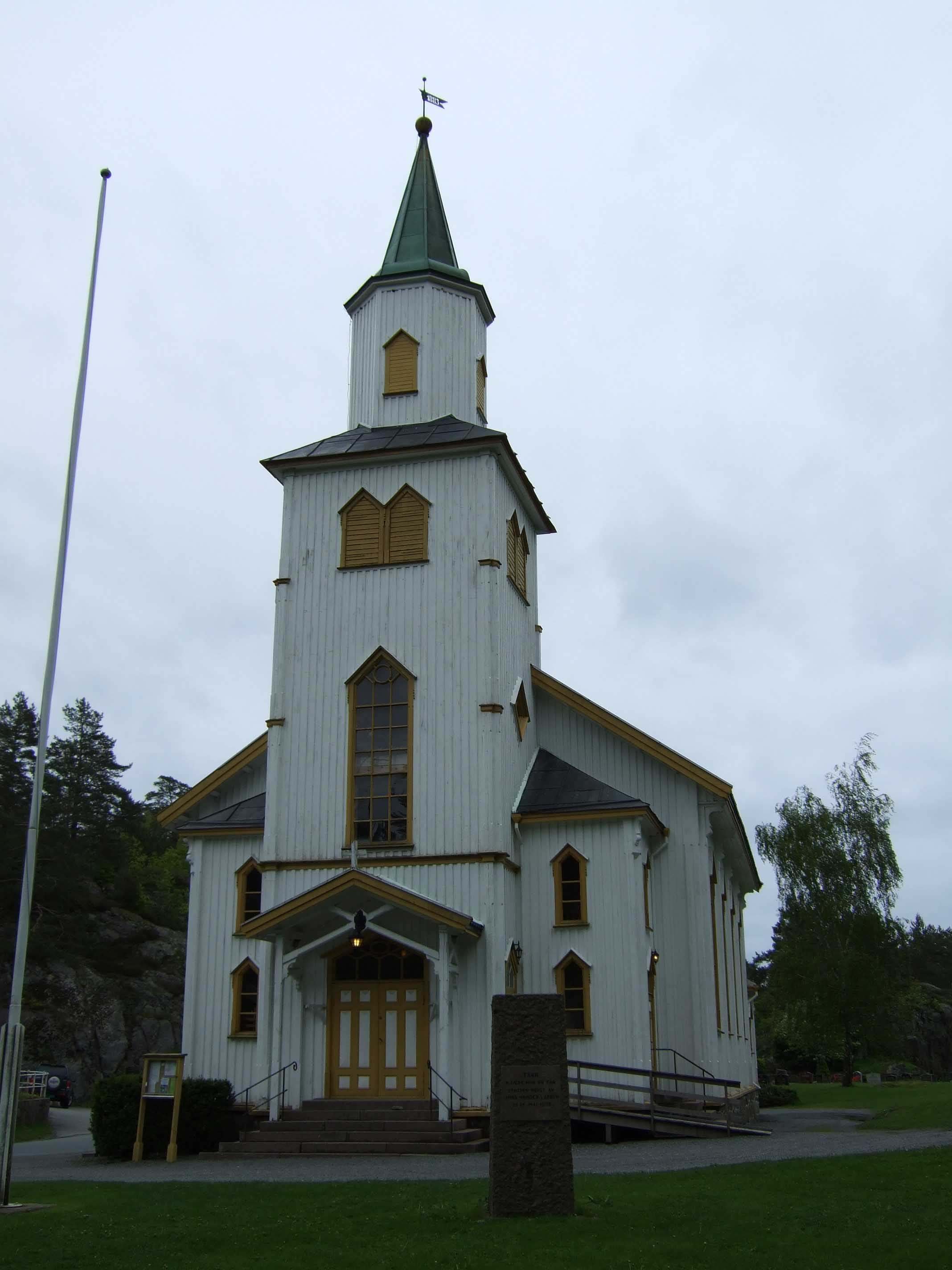

== See also ==
- List of churches in Agder og Telemark
