= Søren Hans Smith Sørensen =

Norwegian ship-owner and politician

Søren Hans Smith Sørensen (9 December 1885 – 31 March 1973) was a Norwegian ship-owner and politician for the Conservative Party.

Sørensen was born on the island of Tromøya in Nedenes county, Norway. He was the son of ship builder O. B. Sørensen (1836–1916), who established Bratteklev skipsverft on Tromøya. He started as a ship captain in 1912. After the death of his father in 1916, he ran the combined business of ship-ownership and shipbuilding until his own death in 1973. In 1930, he established Smith-Sørensens Tankrederi in Arendal. He was also involved in local marine insurance.

He was a member of the municipal council for Tromøy Municipality during the term 1916–1919, and then served as mayor from 1919 to 1941 and in 1945. He was elected to the Norwegian Parliament from Aust-Agder in 1945, but was not re-elected in 1949.

== See also ==
- Assuranceforeningen Gard
