= Ole Nilsen Weierholt =

Norwegian wood carver

Ole Nilsen Weierholt (December 29, 1718 – December 14, 1792) was a wood carver, primarily known as a pattern maker for ironworks in Nedenes county, Norway, especially for the Næs Ironworks. He created wooden patterns in the Rococo style for cast-iron stoves, and has been referred to as the "Rococo Master of Southern Norway" (Norwegian: Sørlandets rokokkomester).

Weierholt was born in Sagene in the Østre Moland parish (today part of Arendal Municipality). He worked as a carpenter and wood carver, and he was involved in a large number of construction jobs for the district's churches in the mid-1700s, including Austre Moland Church and Tromøy Church.

Weierholt created many casting patterns for the Næs Ironworks; he is especially known for the pattern "the chamberlain from Ethiopia" (Kammersvenden av Morland), which he copied from an older model. The theme is based on the story of "Philip and the Ethiopian" (Acts 8:26–39), and it was also used in Rembrandt's painting The Baptism of the Eunuch.

Weierholt also created oven patterns for the Froland Ironworks and for the ironworks in Lower Telemark.
