= Revesand =

Village in Arendal Municipality, Norway

- Village
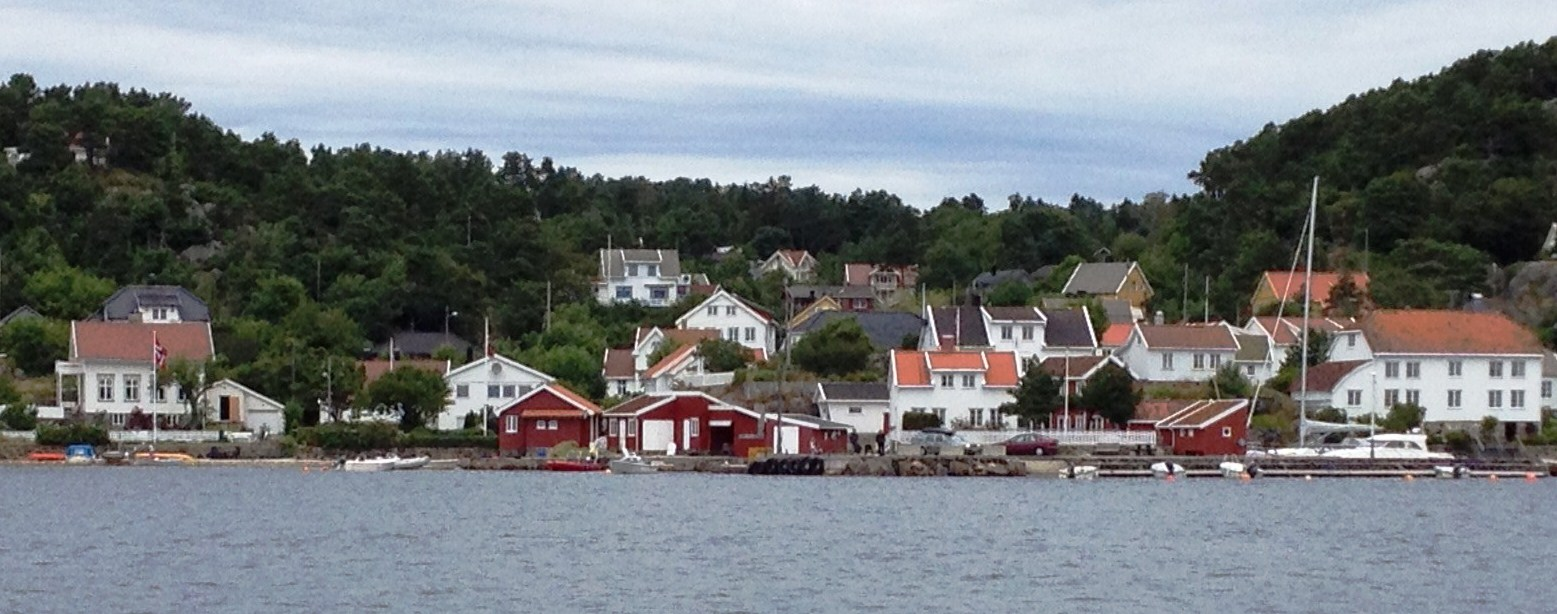
- View of the village harbour
- Interactive map of Revesand
- Coordinates: 58.4380°N 8.8002°E
- Country: Norway
- Region: Southern Norway
- County: Agder
- District: Østre Agder
- Municipality: Arendal Municipality
- Elevation: 4 m (13 ft)
- Time zone: UTC+01:00 (CET)
  - Summer (DST): UTC+02:00 (CEST)
- Post Code: 4818 Færvik

Revesand is a village in Arendal Municipality in Agder county, Norway. The village is located at the southern coast of the island of Tromøy, about 1 kilometre (0.62 mi) north of the island outport of Merdø.
