= Tromøy Bridge =

Tromøy Bridge Tromøybrua / Tromøybroa
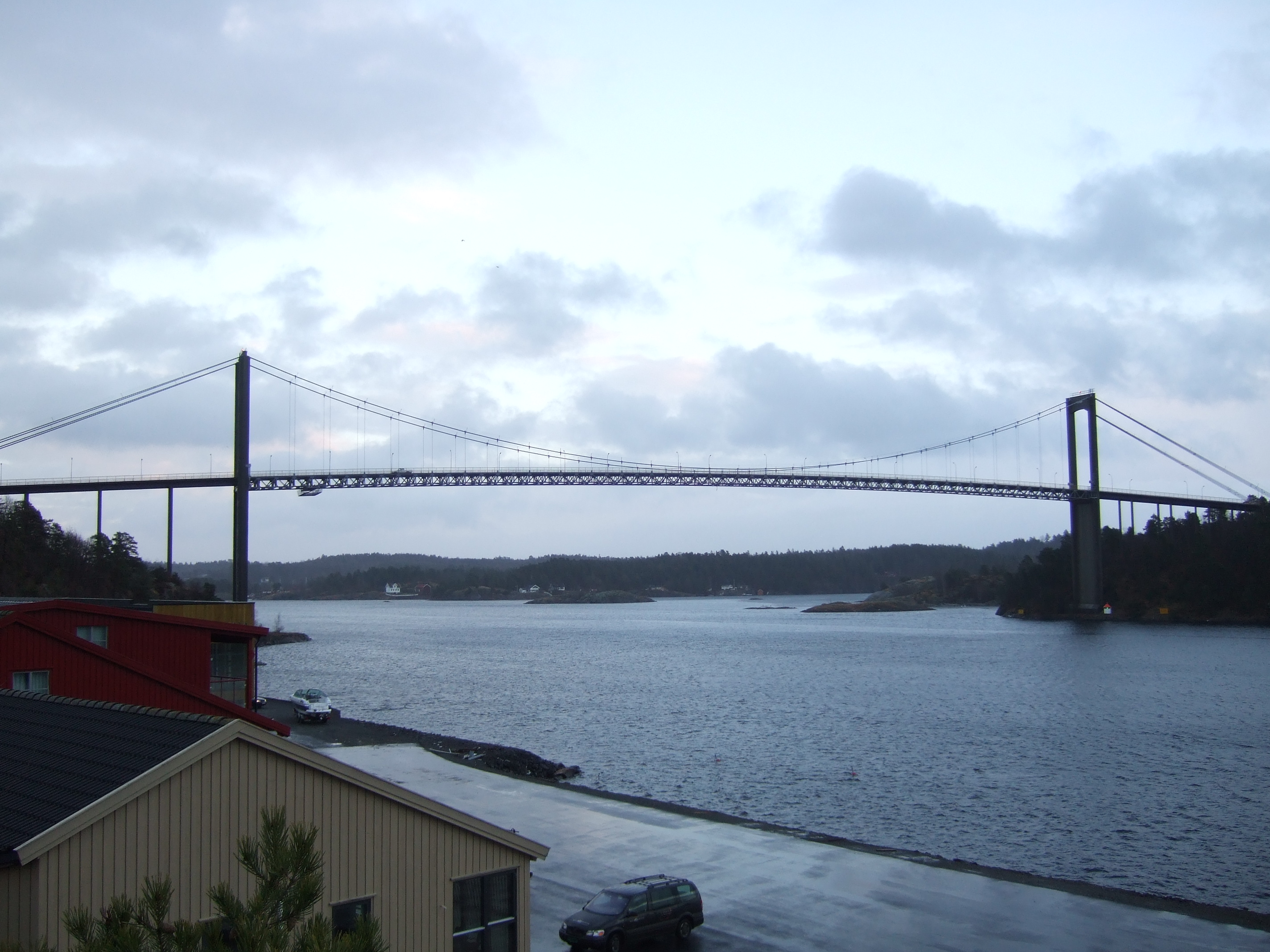
- View of the bridge seen from the mainland
- Coordinates: 58°28′16″N 08°49′23″E
- Carries: Fv409
- Crosses: Tromøysundet
- Locale: Arendal, Norway

Characteristics
- Design: Suspension bridge
- Material: Concrete and steel
- Total length: 400 metres (1,300 ft)
- Longest span: 240 metres (790 ft)
- No. of spans: 12
- Clearance above: 37 metres (121 ft)

History
- Opened: 21 Oct 1961

Statistics
- Daily traffic: 8,350 (in 2008)

Location
- Interactive map of Tromøy Bridge

The Tromøy Bridge (Norwegian: Tromøybrua) is a suspension bridge that crosses the Tromøysundet strait in Arendal Municipality in Agder county, Norway. It connects the island of Tromøya with the mainland, about 3.5 kilometres (2.2 mi) northeast of the town of Arendal.

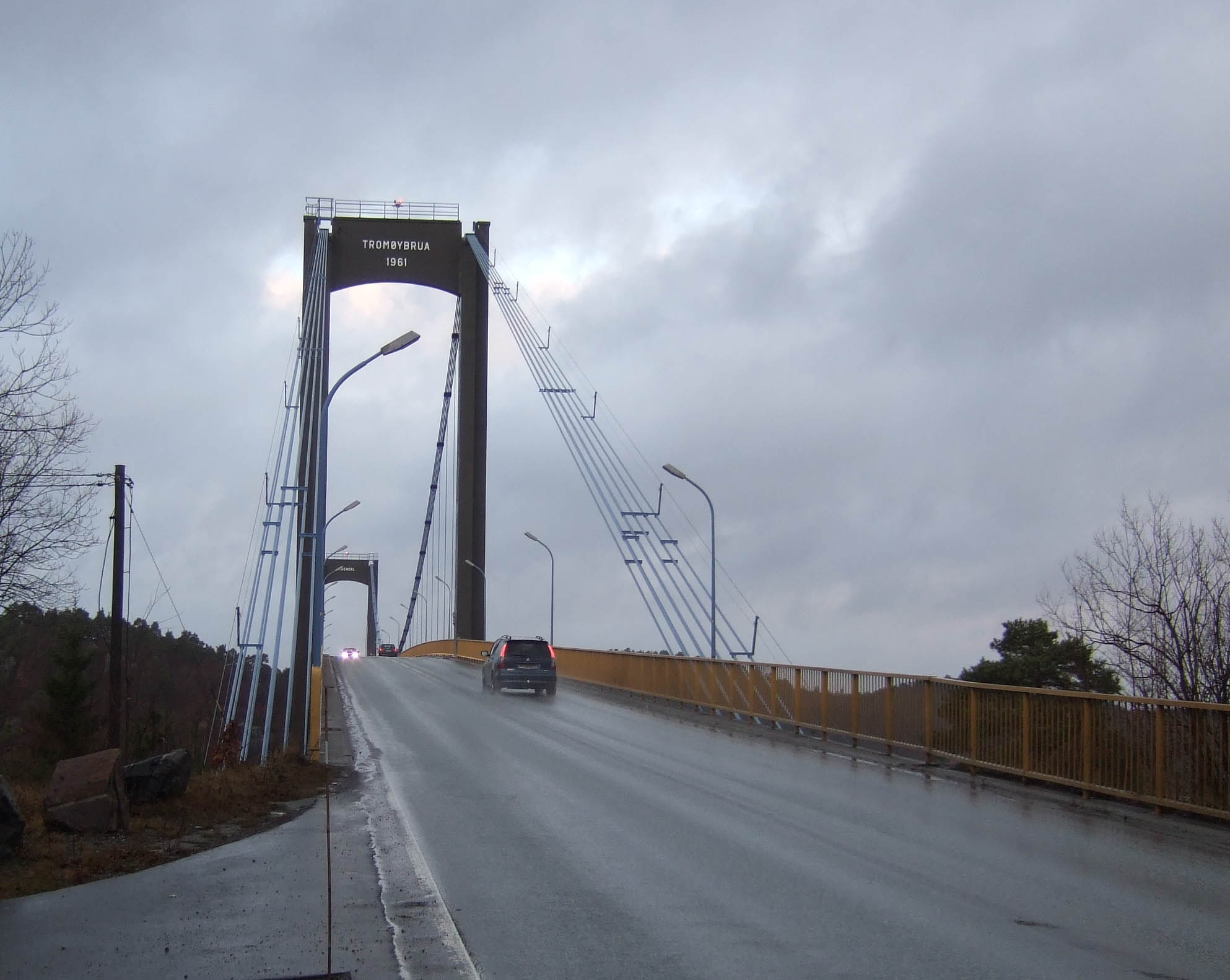
The Tromøy Bridge seen from Tromøya.

The bridge is part of Norwegian County Road 409 and it opened on 21 October 1961 by Trygve Bratteli, the Minister of Transport and Communications. The bridge originally cost 7 million kr. The 400-metre (1,300 ft) long bridge has 12 spans, the longest of which is 240 metres (790 ft). The bridge has a 37 metres (121 ft) high clearance underneath it so ships may pass under it. In 2008, the annual average daily traffic was 8,350 cars per day.

Its building was prepared by a special committee which was chaired by Christian Stray during its entire existence from 1938 to 1961.

== See also ==
- List of bridges in Norway
- List of bridges in Norway by length
- List of bridges by length
