= Tromøy Church =

Church in Agder, Norway

- Tromøy kirke
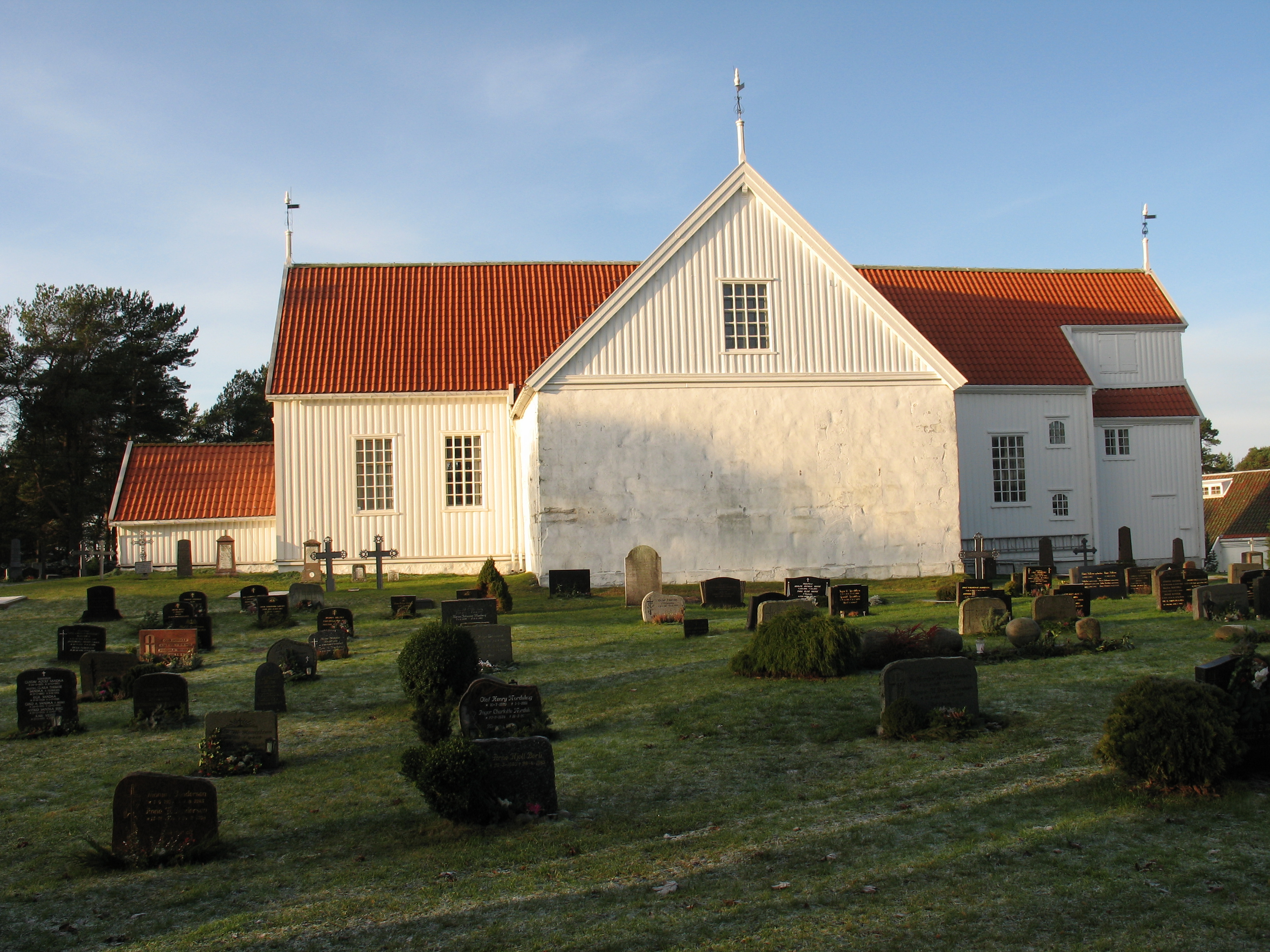
- View of the church
- Tromøy Church
- 58.44978°N 08.86410°E
- Location: Arendal Municipality, Agder
- Country: Norway
- Denomination: Church of Norway
- Previous denomination: Catholic Church
- Churchmanship: Evangelical Lutheran

History
- Status: Parish church
- Founded: c. 1150
- Consecrated: c. 1150
- Events: 1748: Complete renovation

Architecture
- Functional status: Active
- Architectural type: Cruciform
- Completed: c. 1150 (876 years ago)

Specifications
- Capacity: 290
- Materials: Stone

Administration
- Diocese: Agder og Telemark
- Deanery: Arendal prosti
- Parish: Tromøy
- Norwegian Cultural Heritage Site
- Type: Church
- Status: Automatically protected
- ID: 85672

Tromøy Church (Norwegian: Tromøy kirke) is a parish church of the Church of Norway in Arendal Municipality in Agder county, Norway. It is located in the village of Brekka on the east coast of the island of Tromøy. It is one of the churches for the Tromøy parish which is part of the Arendal prosti (deanery) in the Diocese of Agder og Telemark. The white, stone church was built around the year 1150 using plans drawn up by an unknown architect. The church seats about 290 people. This was the main church for Tromøy Municipality from 1878 until its dissolution in 1992.

The church was originally built in a long church design around the year 1150 and over the centuries it was enlarged and expanded. In 1748, the church was converted into a cruciform design by the architect Ole Nielsen Weierholt. As a medieval building, it automatically has protected cultural heritage status.

== Location ==
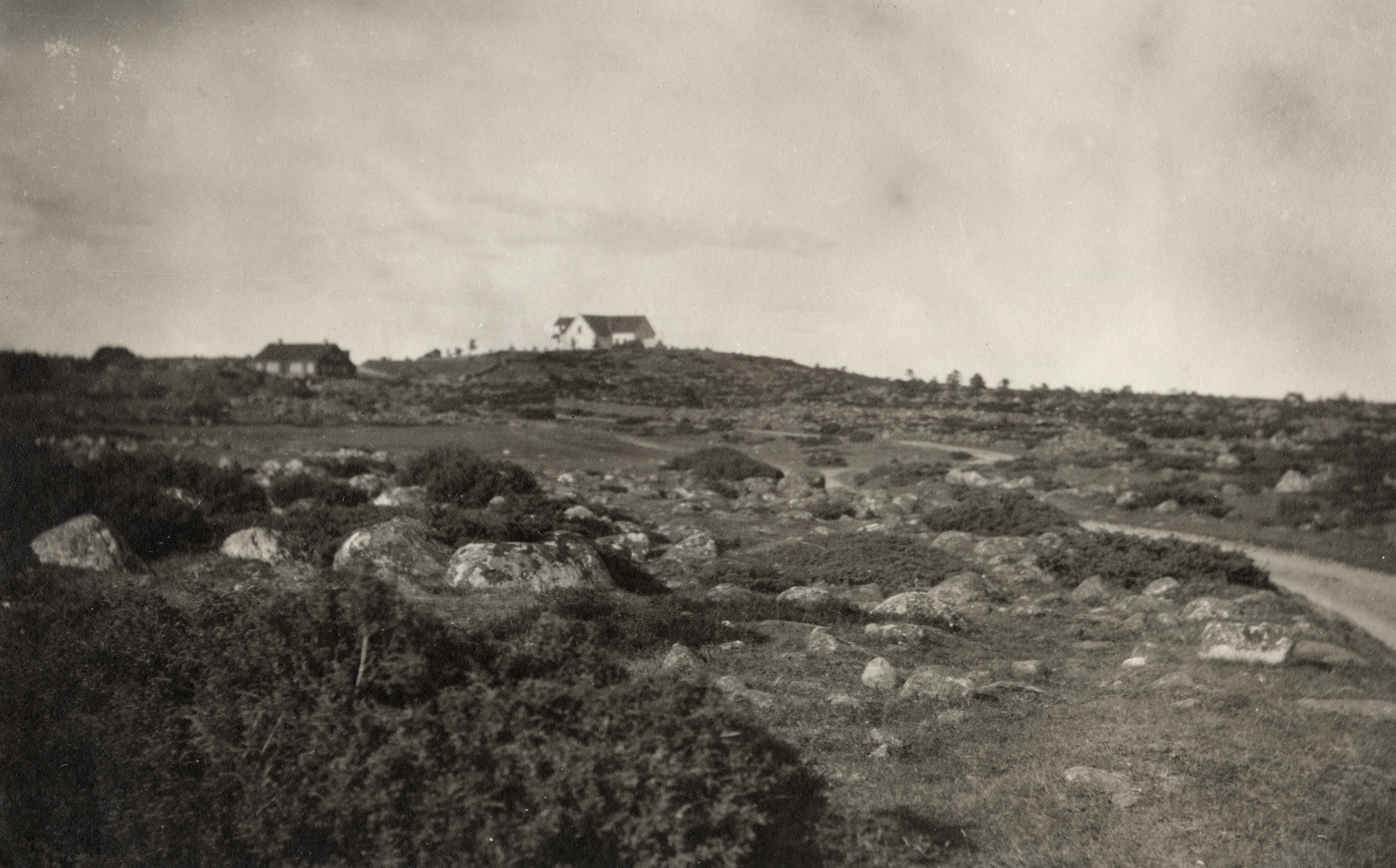
View of the church from the ocean in the early 1900s before the trees grew up around the church.

The church stands between Hove and Brekka, on the outer shore of the island of Tromøy. Before afforestation took place in the late 1900s, the church was visible from the sea. The church was used as a landmark for navigation in the Skagerrak because it was an easily recognizable element in the outline of the coast seen by sailors. It is marked on all nautical charts, and until 1940 the National Office for Lighthouses and Coastal Safety (Statens fyr- og merkevesen) was responsible for painting the church's south walls white.

== History ==
The earliest existing historical records of the church date back to the year 1320 when a court document mentions Sira Ifvar who was a priest at the church in Tromøy (then spelled Þrumu). The church was likely built around the year 1300.

As late as 1794, Tromøy Church was the parish church for Holt, which covered a much larger geographic area than the island of Tromøy itself, and many had a long journey to church that was hazardous in winter. Since 1878, they have been separate parishes; the mainland portion of the parish of Tromøy covered an area from Strømsbu (west of Arendal) to Eydehavn, at that time it also included part of Austre Moland Municipality as well.

=== Original construction ===
Most likely, Tromøy Church originally had a rectangular layout that concluded with an apse facing east. Its walls are 1.5 meters (4.9 ft) thick. Experts that have studied the church believe that the church was first built in the old style and that the structure's style and details suggest that it is one of the oldest existing churches in Norway today. Archaeological excavations are required for more accurate dating. In Old Norwegian the church was called Thrumu kirkja (Thrumu Church). The church was later extended and the choir was expanded to the east. This probably took place in the Middle Ages during the Gothic period, at some point between 1300 and 1400.

It has also been hypothesized that Tromøy Church may have had a round west tower. Many of its reused stones have a slightly curved surface, which may indicate that they were used in the outer surface of a circular construction. It is known, for example, that Lunner Church had such a round tower.

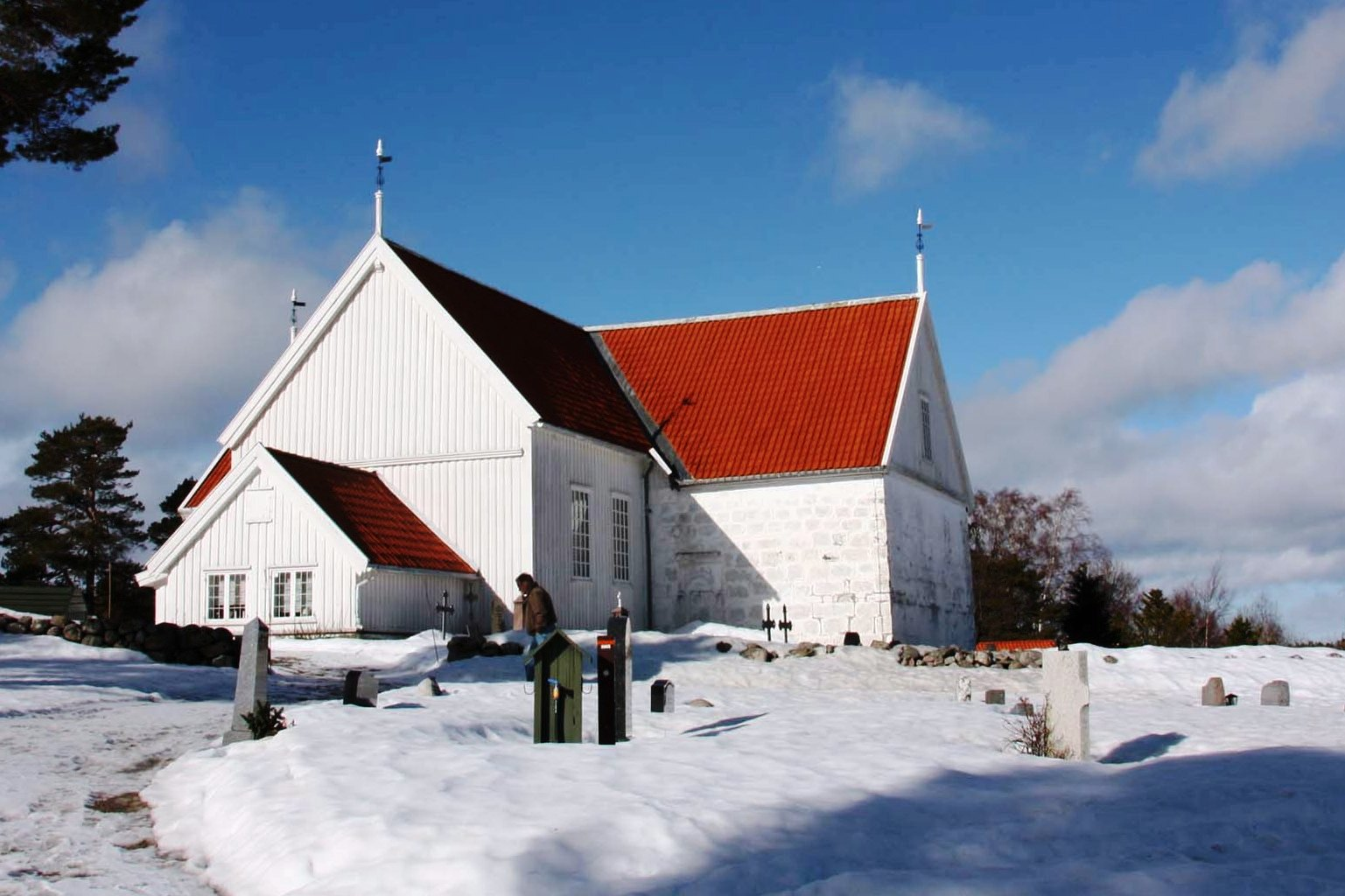
Tromøy Church seen from the south

=== Rebuilding and restoration ===
The church was entirely rebuilt in 1748. The medieval long church was divided in half and used as the transept for a cruciform church with a nave and choir built of wood. Ole Nilsen Weierholt was in charge of the construction. All of the walls were increased in height, and the ceiling was barrel-vaulted. The church was richly decorated with Rococo ornamentation painted by Jørgen Schultz in the 1750s. This was painted over in the 1880s, but was uncovered again during a major restoration carried out between 1926 and 1939.

=== Election church ===
In 1814, this church served as an election church (Norwegian: valgkirke). Together with more than 300 other parish churches across Norway, it was a polling station for elections to the 1814 Norwegian Constituent Assembly which wrote the Constitution of Norway. This was Norway's first national election. Each church parish was a constituency that elected people called "electors" who later met together in each county to elect the representatives for the assembly that was to meet at Eidsvoll Manor later that year.

== Interior elements ==
The church contains a medieval baptismal font carved from soapstone. The church's altar and the pulpit date from 1725 and were created by Mogens Christian Trane. The wooden chancel screen displays the monogram of King Frederick V, flanked by lions and angels; it was carved by Ole Nilsen Weierholt. Weierholt probably also produced many of the other carvings in the church such as the fronts of the galleries and the confessional.

The church also has a votive ship from 1751 hanging from the ceiling. It is a model of a frigate from Copenhagen, the East Indies ship Dronningen av Danmark (Queen of Denmark). Jens Boye gave the model to the church; he was a priest onboard one of the ship's journeys to Guangzhou, China and later served as the parish priest in Tromøy. Boye also gave the church a book about the ship's journey to China. The ship's first officer, Zacharias Allewelt, owned the Merdø farm at the outport on neighboring Merdø island. The church also preserved an organ from c. 1750, which is now kept at the Norwegian Museum of Cultural History in Oslo.

== Grotesques ==
The church has a reworked Romanesque portal with a pair of grotesques on the wall, one on each side. The left one is a face with a hand pulling the beard, and the other is a face sticking out its tongue. The motifs have similar parallels carved in stone at Hedrum Church in Vestfold and at Lunner Church, but are stylistically different. A tale says that the grotesques represent two severed heads that were bricked into the wall, belonging to two thieves that stole the church's silver and were then captured and executed.

== Media gallery ==
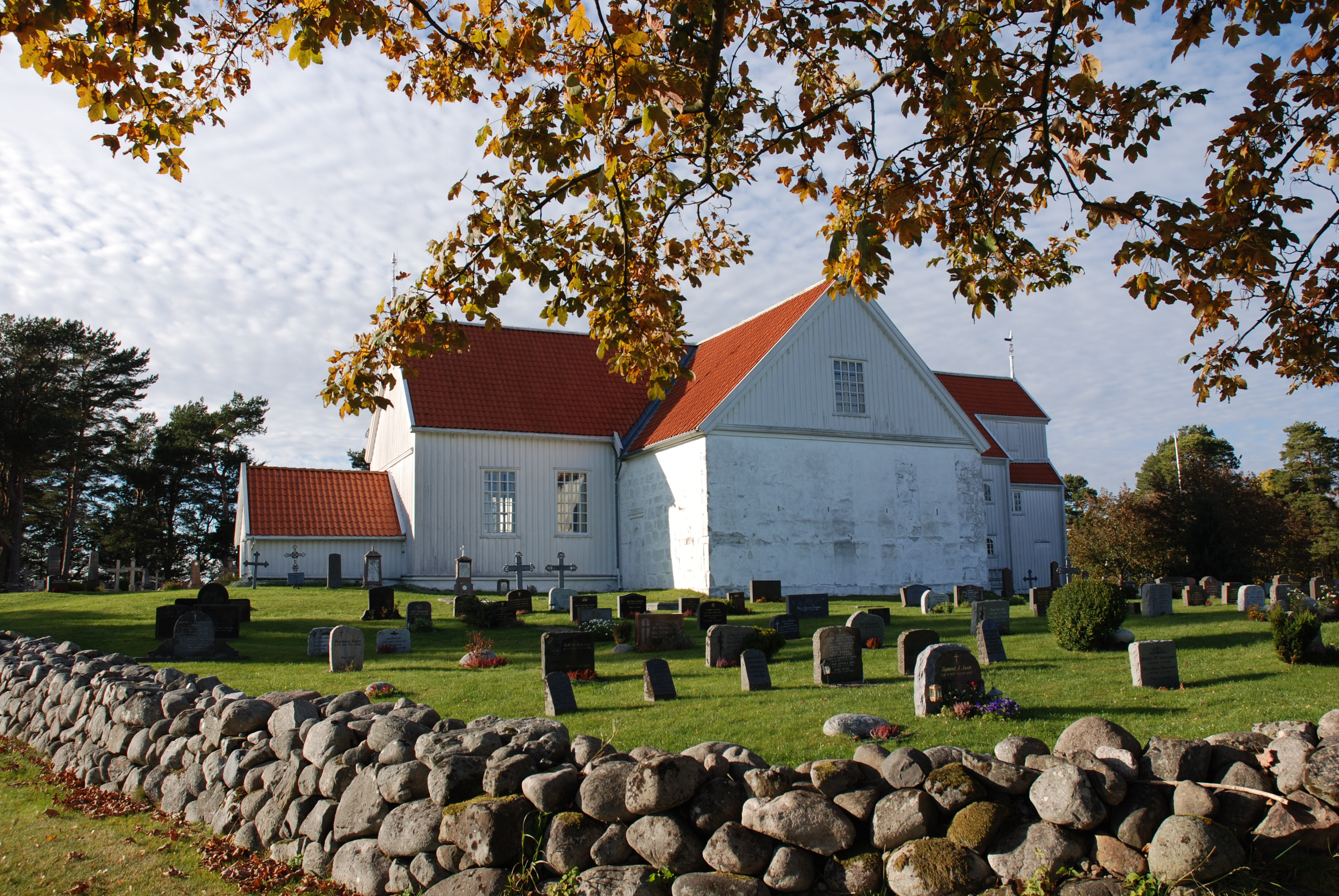
View of the graveyard

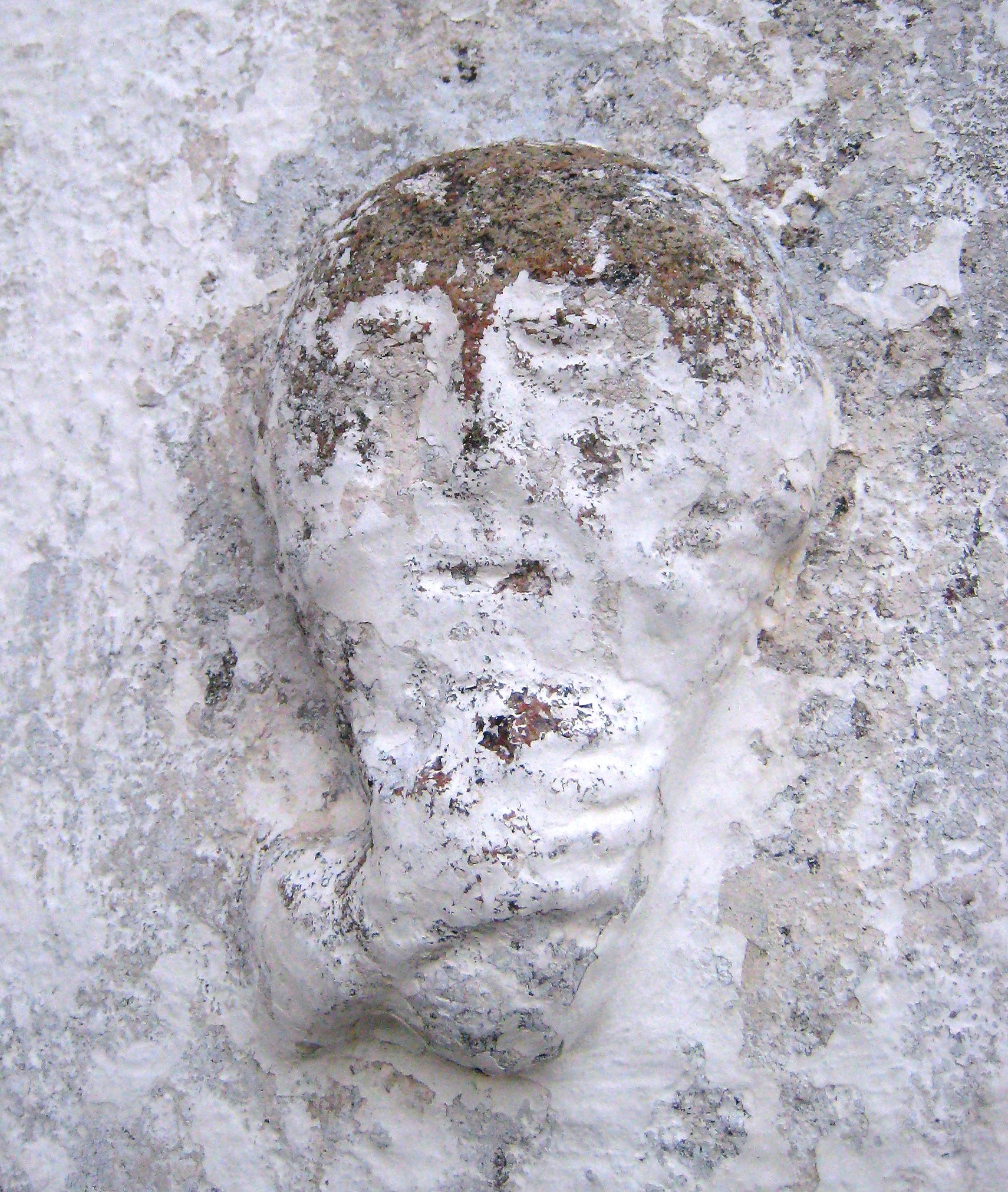
Grotesque: Pulling the beard (skjeggtrekker)

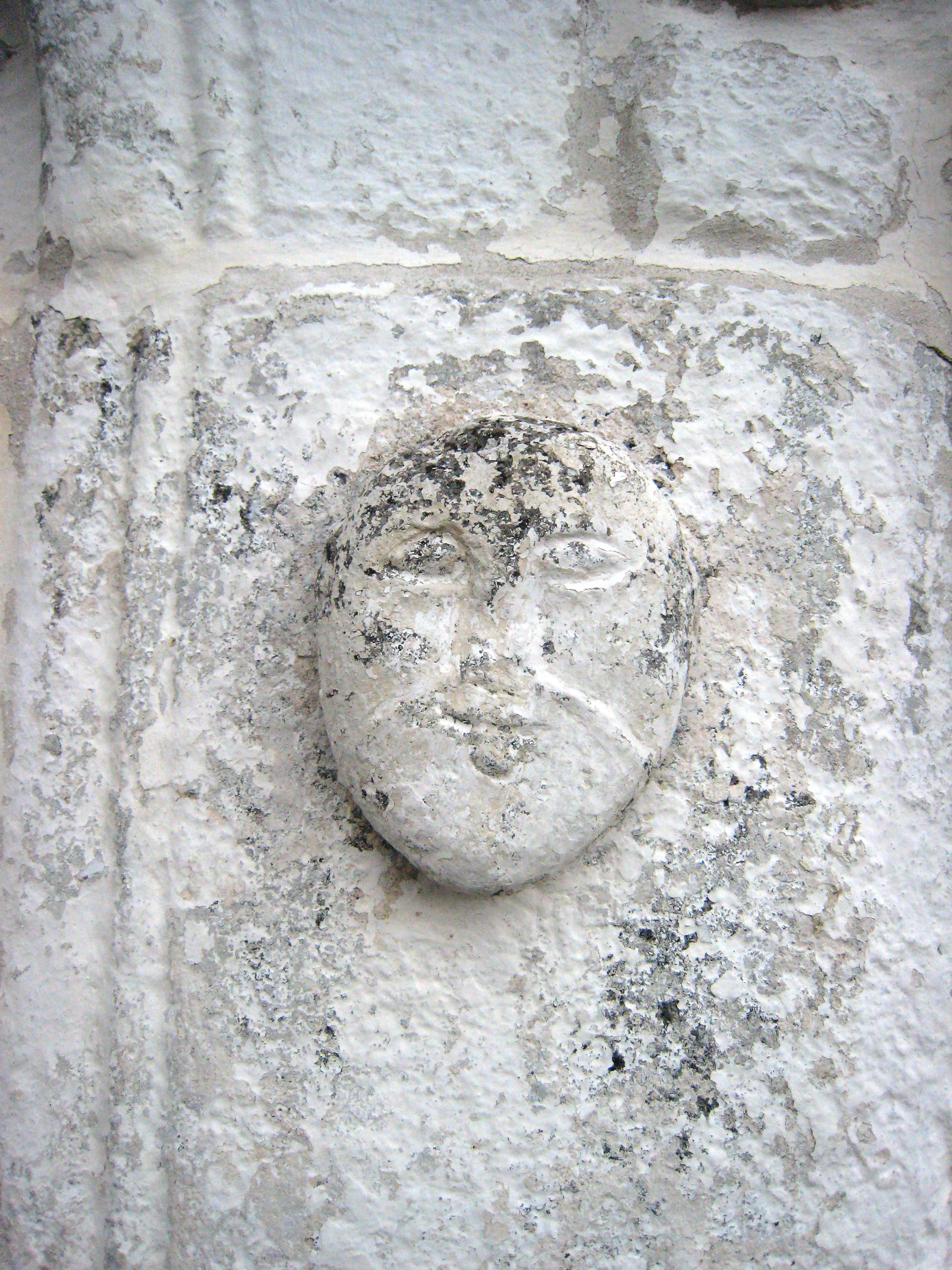
Grotesque:Sticking out the tongue (tungerekker)

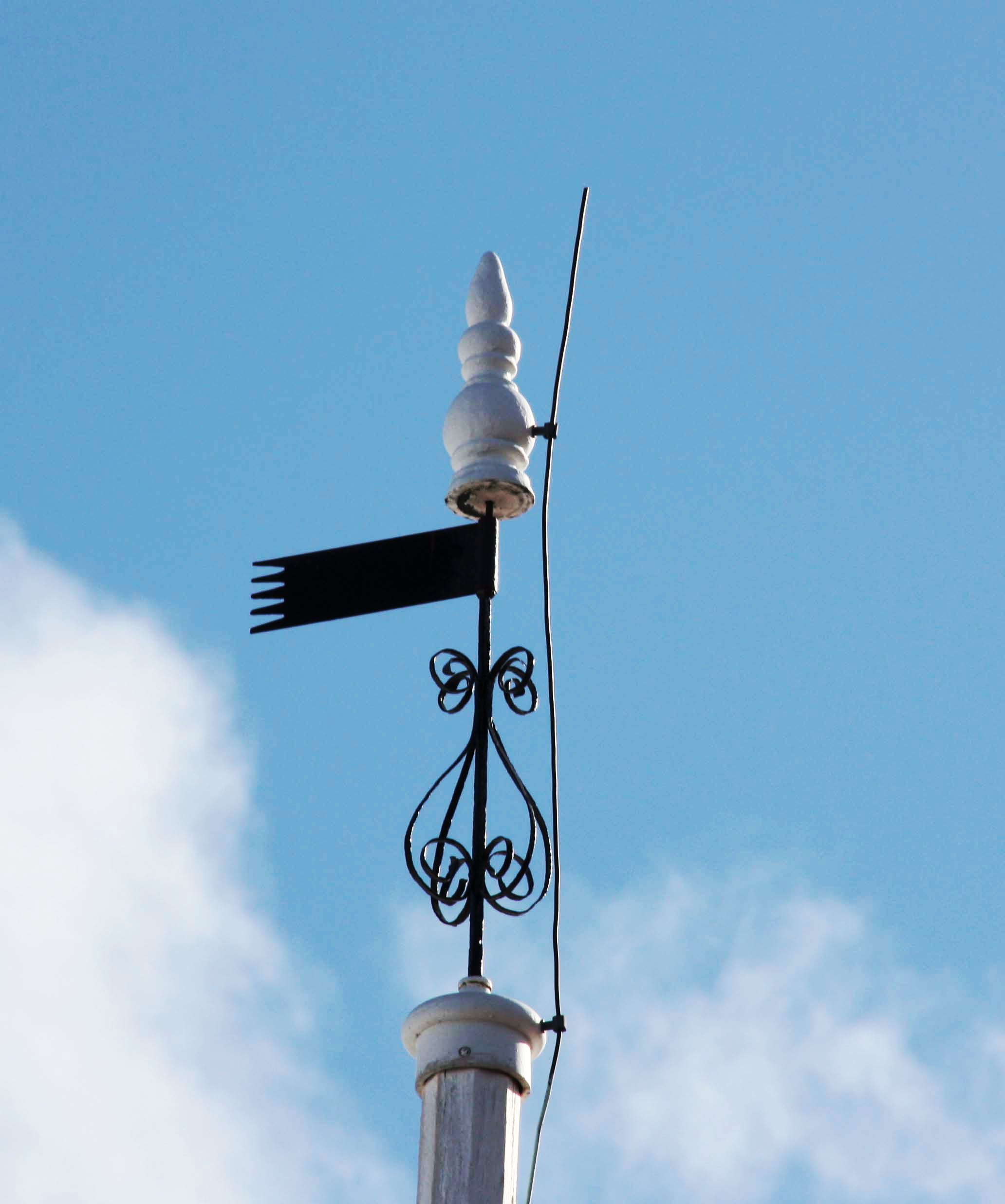
Spire on top of the tower

== See also ==
- List of churches in Agder og Telemark
