= Pusnes, Arendal =

Village in Arendal Municipality, Norway

Pusnes
- Village
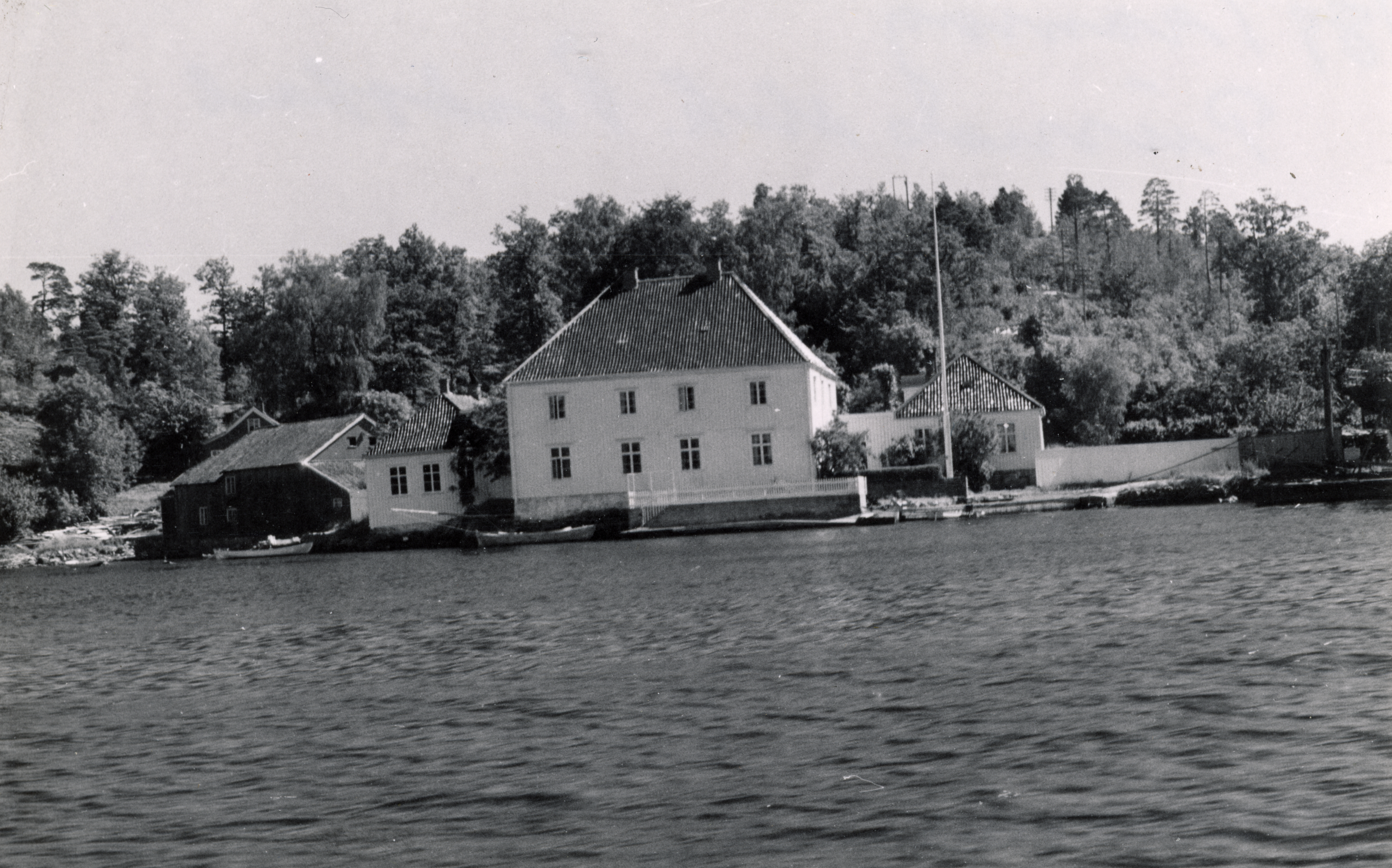
- View of the old Pusnes gård buildings
- Interactive map of Pusnes
- Coordinates: 58.4604°N 08.7886°E
- Country: Norway
- Region: Southern Norway
- County: Agder
- District: Østre Agder
- Municipality: Arendal Municipality
- Elevation: 3 m (9.8 ft)
- Time zone: UTC+01:00 (CET)
  - Summer (DST): UTC+02:00 (CEST)
- Post Code: 4818 Færvik

Pusnes is a village in Arendal Municipality in Agder county, Norway. The village is located on the southwestern edge of the island of Tromøya, just across the strait from the town of Arendal. There is a ferry that regularly crosses the strait from Pusnes to Arendal. Pusnes is primarily an industrial area.
