= Tromøya =

Largest island in Southern Norway

Tromøya Tromøy Tromø (historic)
Nickname: The pearl of Southern Norway
- Interactive map of the island

Geography
- Location: Agder, Norway
- Coordinates: 58.46171°N 8.84683°E
- Area: 28.6 km^{2} (11.0 sq mi)
- Area rank: 1st in Aust-Agder
- Length: 12.5 km (7.77 mi)
- Width: 3.8 km (2.36 mi)
- Highest elevation: 94 m (308 ft)
- Highest point: Vardåsen

Administration
- Norway
- County: Agder
- Municipality: Arendal Municipality

Demographics
- Population: 5300 (2015)
- Pop. density: 185/km^{2} (479/sq mi)

Tromøya (Urban East Norwegian: [ˈtrʊ̂mːœʏɑ]) or Tromøy (Urban East Norwegian: [ˈtrʊ̂mːœʏ]) is the largest island in Southern Norway. The 28.6-square-kilometre (11.0 sq mi) island is entirely located within Arendal Municipality in Agder county, Norway. The island has about 5,300 residents (in 2015) which gives it a population density of about 185 inhabitants per square kilometre (480/sq mi). The island is located directly across the harbor from the town of Arendal. The highest point on the island is the 95-metre (312 ft) tall Vardåsen. The island is separated from the mainland to the north by the Tromøysundet strait and it is separated from the island of Hisøy to the southwest by the Galtesundet strait.

The 400-metre (1,300 ft) long Tromøy Bridge (Norwegian: Tromøybroa) is the suspension bridge that has been the only road connection to the mainland since it was completed in 1961. There is also a passenger ferry that takes six minutes to transport riders from Skilsø to the town of Arendal. The company Aker Pusnes is located in Pusnes. It is a designer and supplier of all types of deck machinery and mooring systems for marine and offshore applications.

Historically, the island belonged to the old Østre Moland Municipality until 1878. From 1878 until 1992, the island was part of Tromøy Municipality. Since 1992, the island has been a part of Arendal Municipality.

== Name ==
The name of the island (originally the parish) historically was Tromø, but more recently it has been spelled Tromøy or Tromøya. These names come from the Old Norse word Þruma which means "rim", "edge", or "border". The suffix -ø, øy, or -øya all mean "island".

== History ==
=== Viking era ===
Tromøya is known for having once hosted many Viking kings. According to the Ynglinga saga, Harald Granraude, the King of Agder, had his headquarters on Tromøya. It also says that his daughter, Queen Åsa Haraldsdatter, took her one-year-old son, Halfdan Svarte back to Tromøya after the death of Gudrød Veidekonge. There are several place names on Tromøya derived from the Viking era including Kongshamn and Hove.

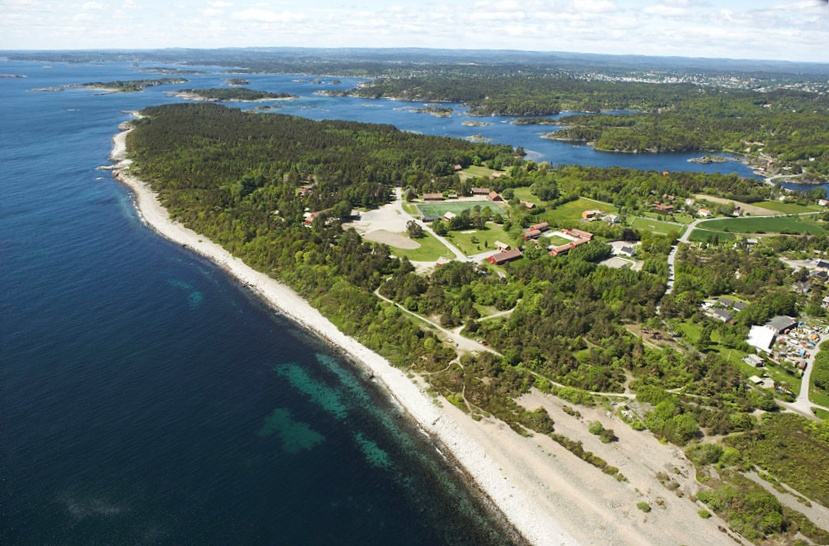
Hove on Tromøy

=== Hove Farm ===
Hove is an area located on the southwestern part of Tromøya which has easily cultivated due to its self-draining soil and it was therefore a convenient place for early agriculture. The first recorded cultivation of potatoes in Norway is believed of have occurred at the Hove farm (Hove gård) which was one of the most significant estates on Tromøya. In 1757, the owner, Nils Mathiasen Aalholm, observed in his garden diary (Nils Aalholms hagedagbok) that potatoes were being cultivated on his farm.

=== World War II ===
During the Occupation of Norway by Nazi Germany (1940-1945), the Germans had an anti-aircraft school on Tromøya called the Feld Flakartillerie-schule 50. This school operated from 1941-1944 at a camp built on the Hove farm. The camp was built for 1,500 men. There were three radars on the island and supposedly four 88 millimetres (3.5 in) anti-aircraft cannons. Construction of a 200-metre (660 ft) airstrip was begun, but never finished. Most of the camp's buildings, including the partially-completed airstrip, are still there today, along with a bunker (R618) with an unknown purpose. The bunker is currently undergoing restorations (in 2007) but work has been halted due to an ownership dispute. The German military used 75 buildings in the area, most of them built during the war.

== Attractions ==
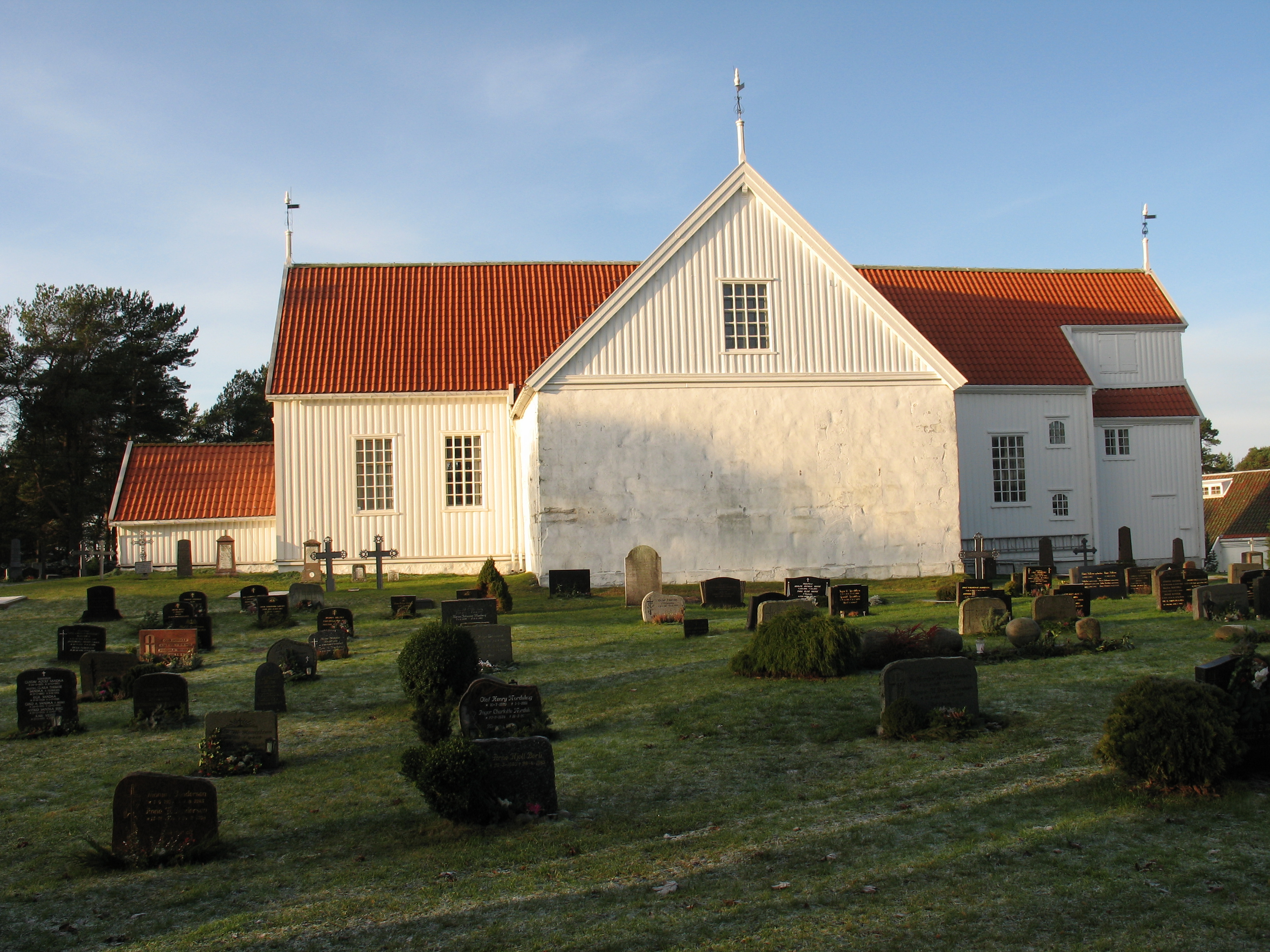
Tromøy Church

=== Tromøy Church ===
Tromøy Church is the main church for all of the Tromøy parish in Arendal. The church is a medieval stone church from 1150. The foundation walls are 1.5 metres (4.9 feet) thick. It was converted into a cruciform church in 1748. The church has a restored brick Romanesque portal with two grotesque face masks on the wall on each side of the portal. The church was painted during the 1750s and decorated in rococo style.

A 1750s-era model of Dronningen av Danmark, a frigate based in Copenhagen, hangs from the ceiling of the church's nave. The baptismal font made of soapstone dates from the medieval period. The altarpiece and pulpit are from 1725.

=== Businesses ===
The Arendal Herregaard Hotell was built in 1930 and it is one of the oldest hotels in the region. It stands about 250 metres (820 ft) from Spornes beach. There are also two camps on the island: Hove Leirsenter (Hove Camp) and the Hove Familie Camping (Hove Family Camping).

=== Hove Festival ===
From 2007 until 2014, the Hove Festival was Norway's largest festival venue, with a capacity of 20,000 people. Headliners for the first year included the American bands Slayer, The Killers, Queens of the Stone Age, and My Chemical Romance. In the fall of 2014, Festival Republic announced that Hove Festival would not return.

== Media gallery ==
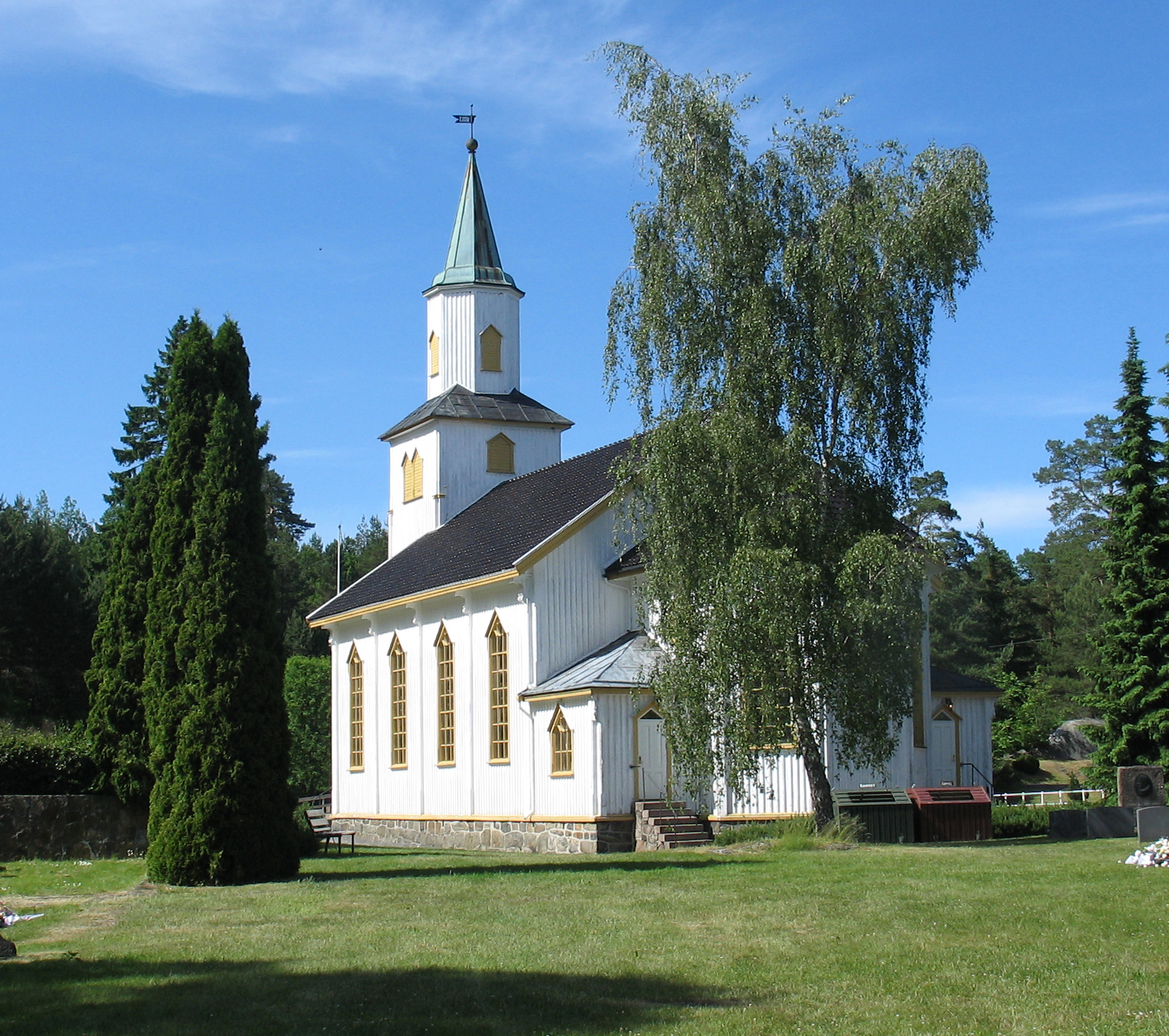
Færvik Church

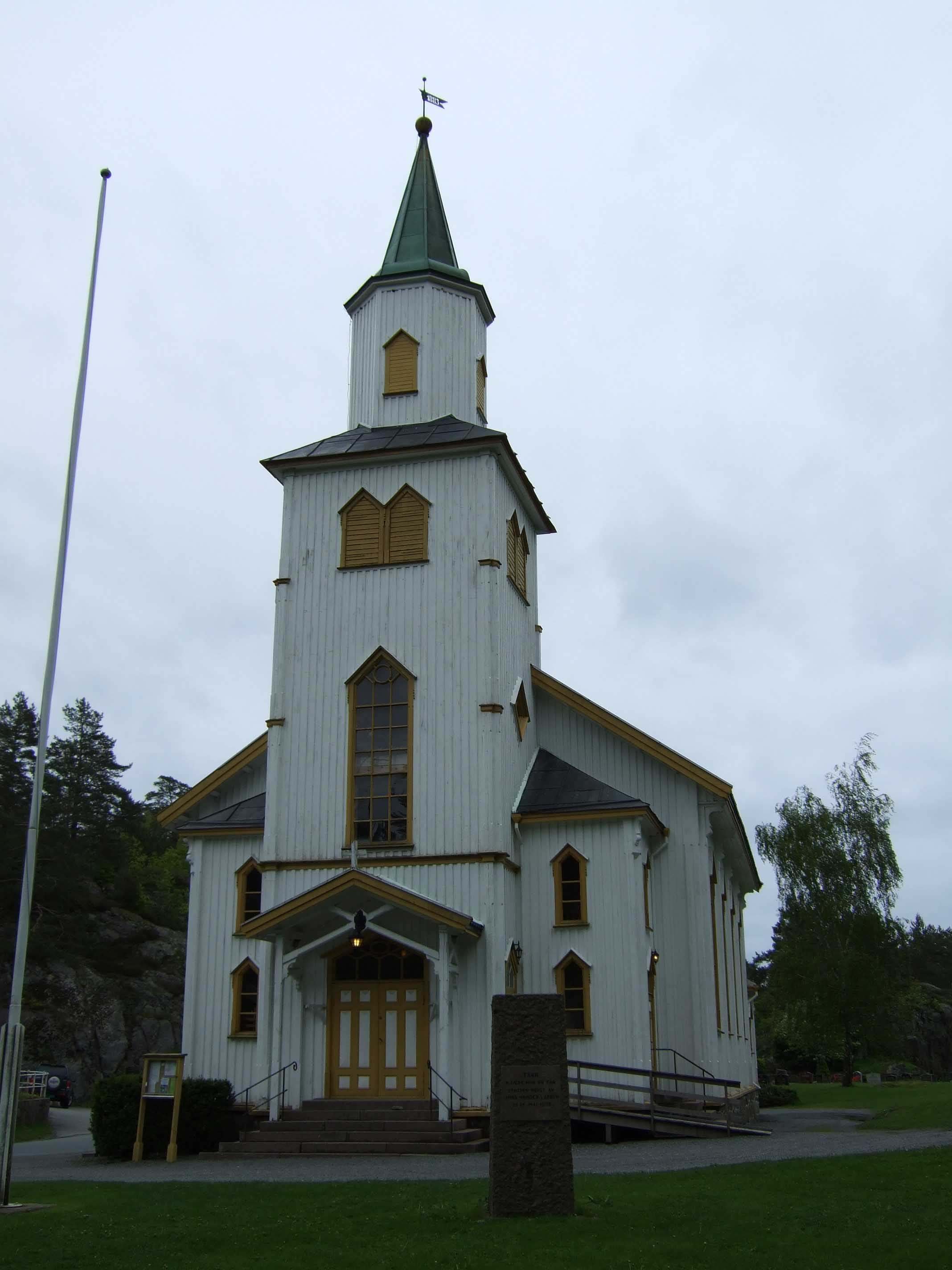
Færvik church

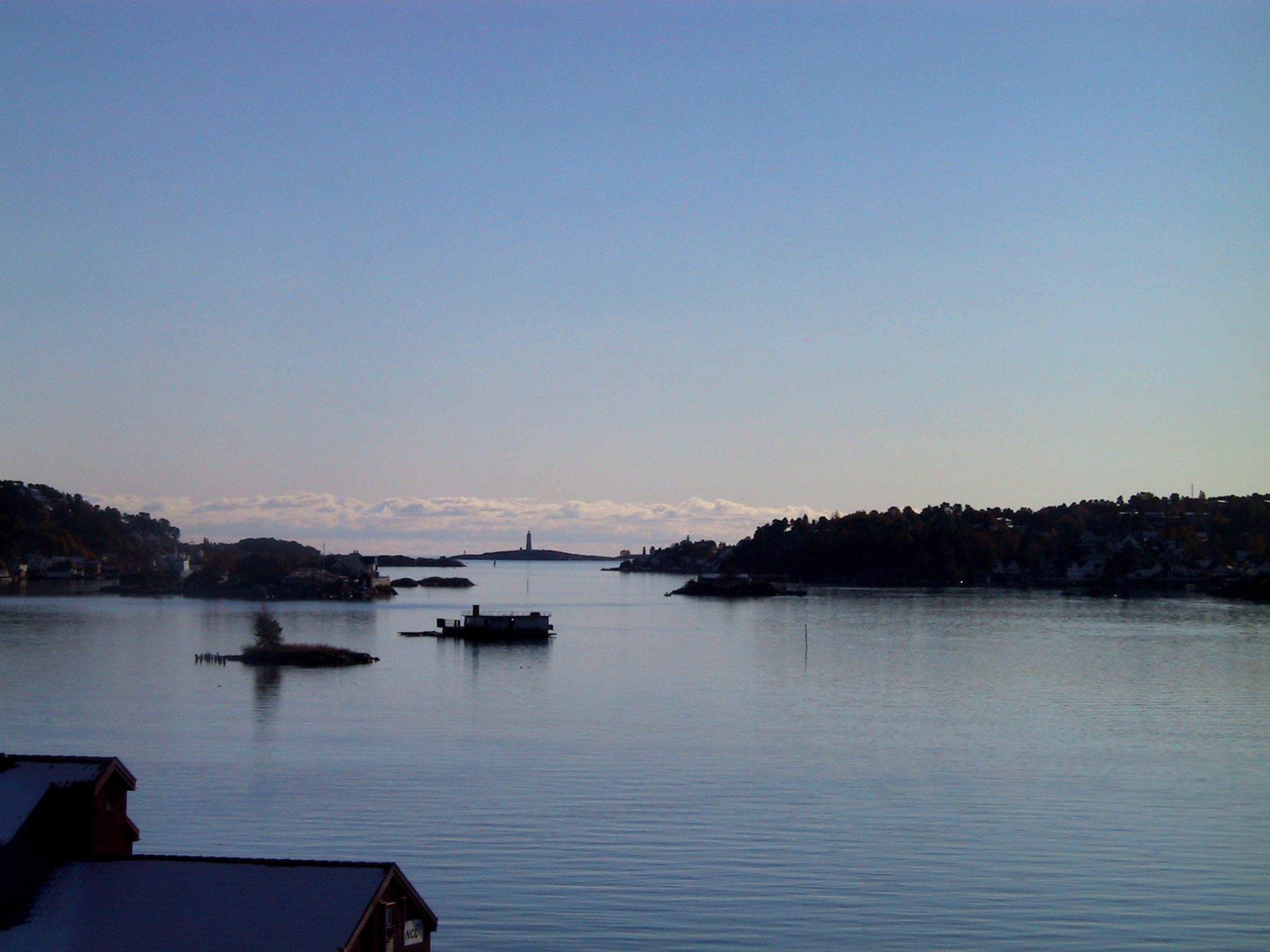
Lighthouse

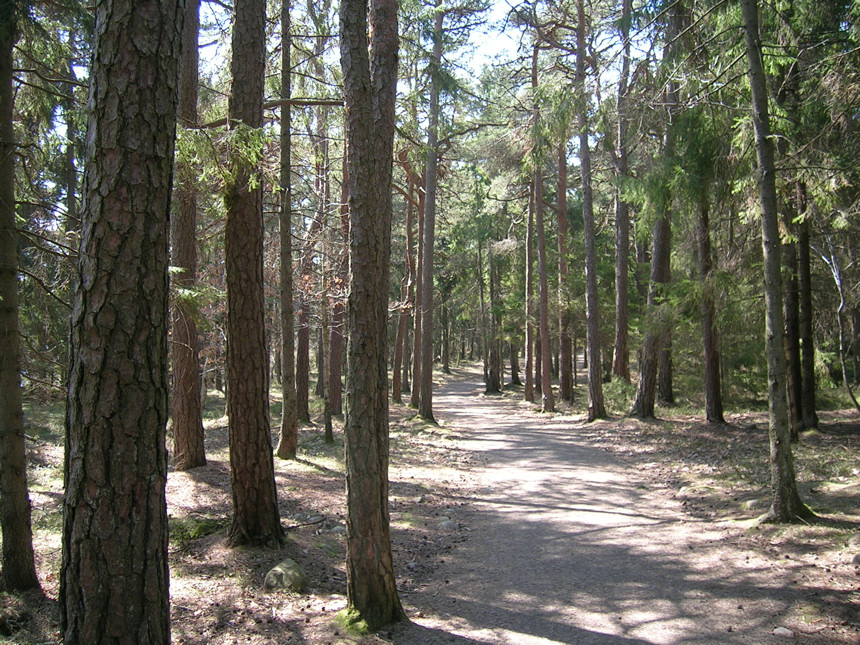
Hove Forest

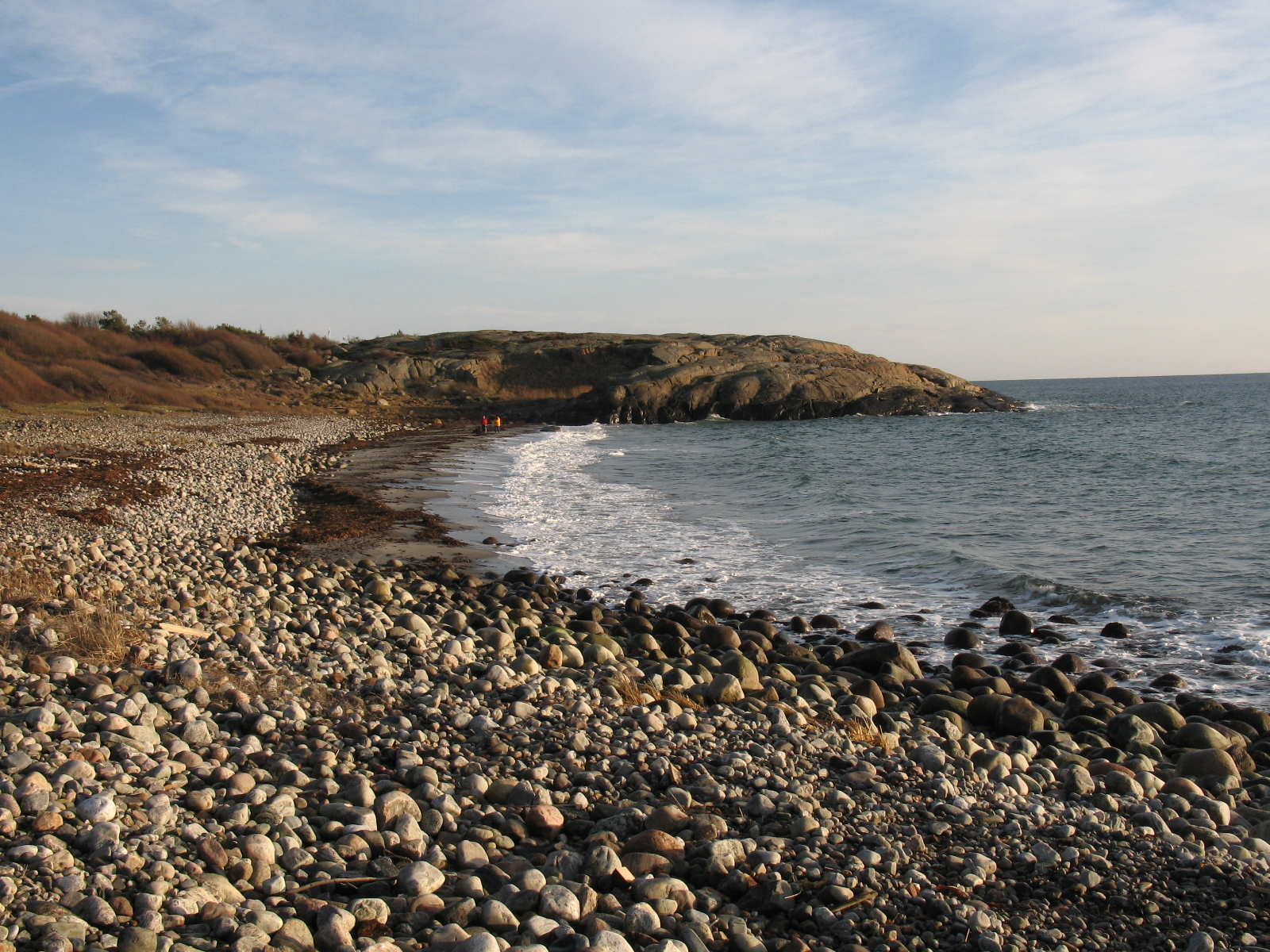
Spornes headland on Tromøy

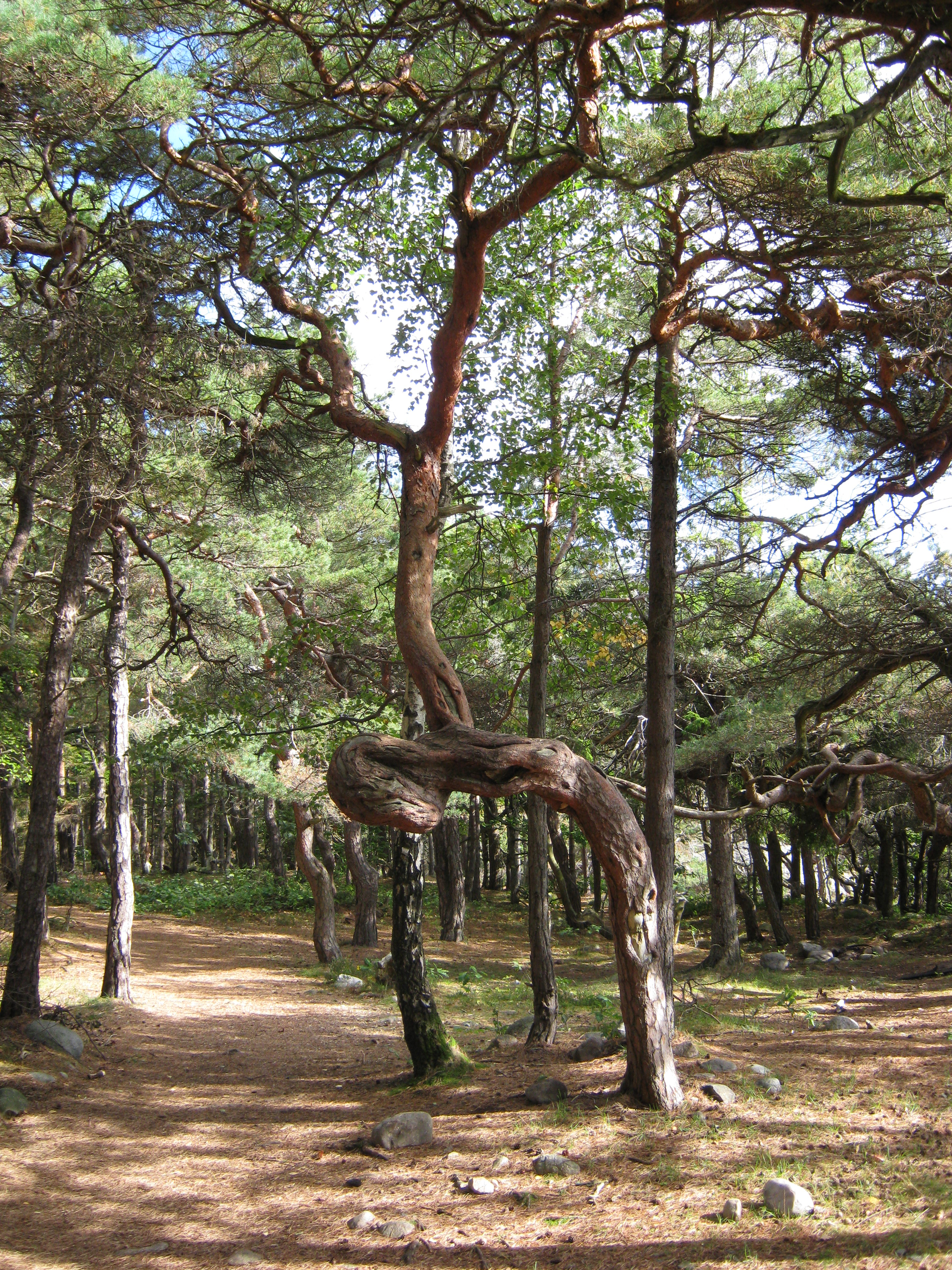
Trees in Hove Forest

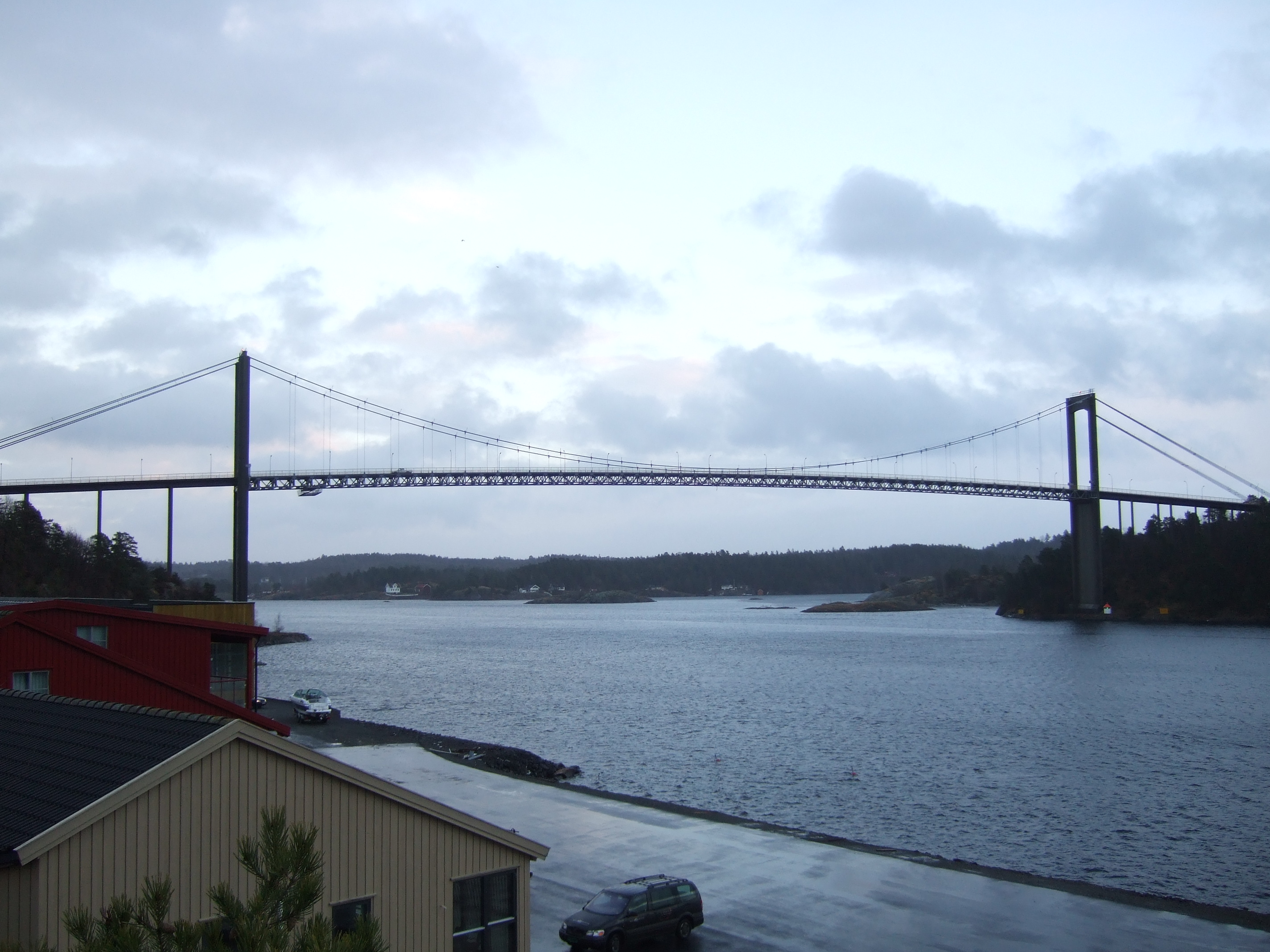
Tromøy Bridge

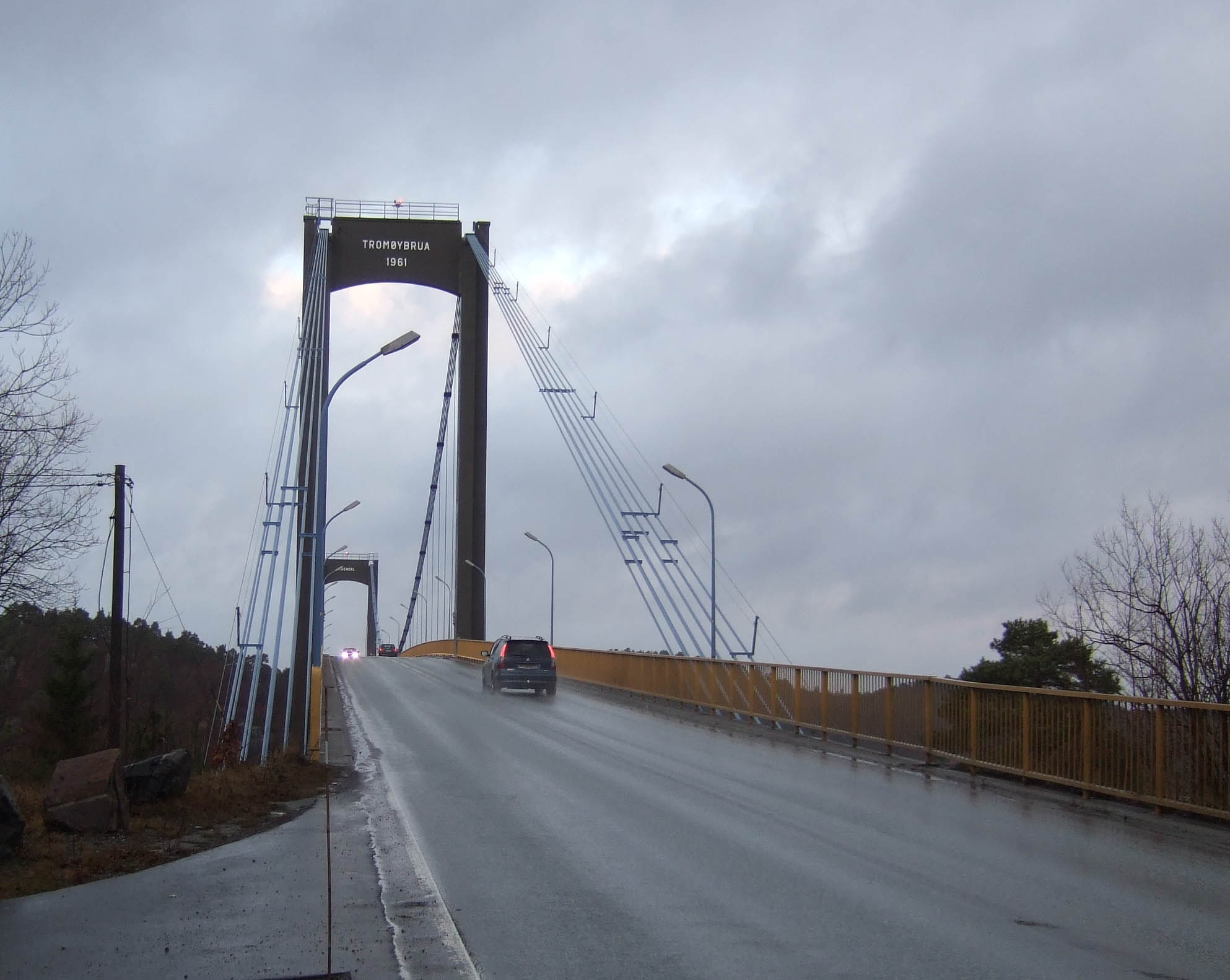
Tromøy bridge
