= Øyestad Municipality =

Former municipality in Aust-Agder, Norway

Øyestad Municipality Øyestad kommune
- Former municipality
- Øiestad herred (historic name)
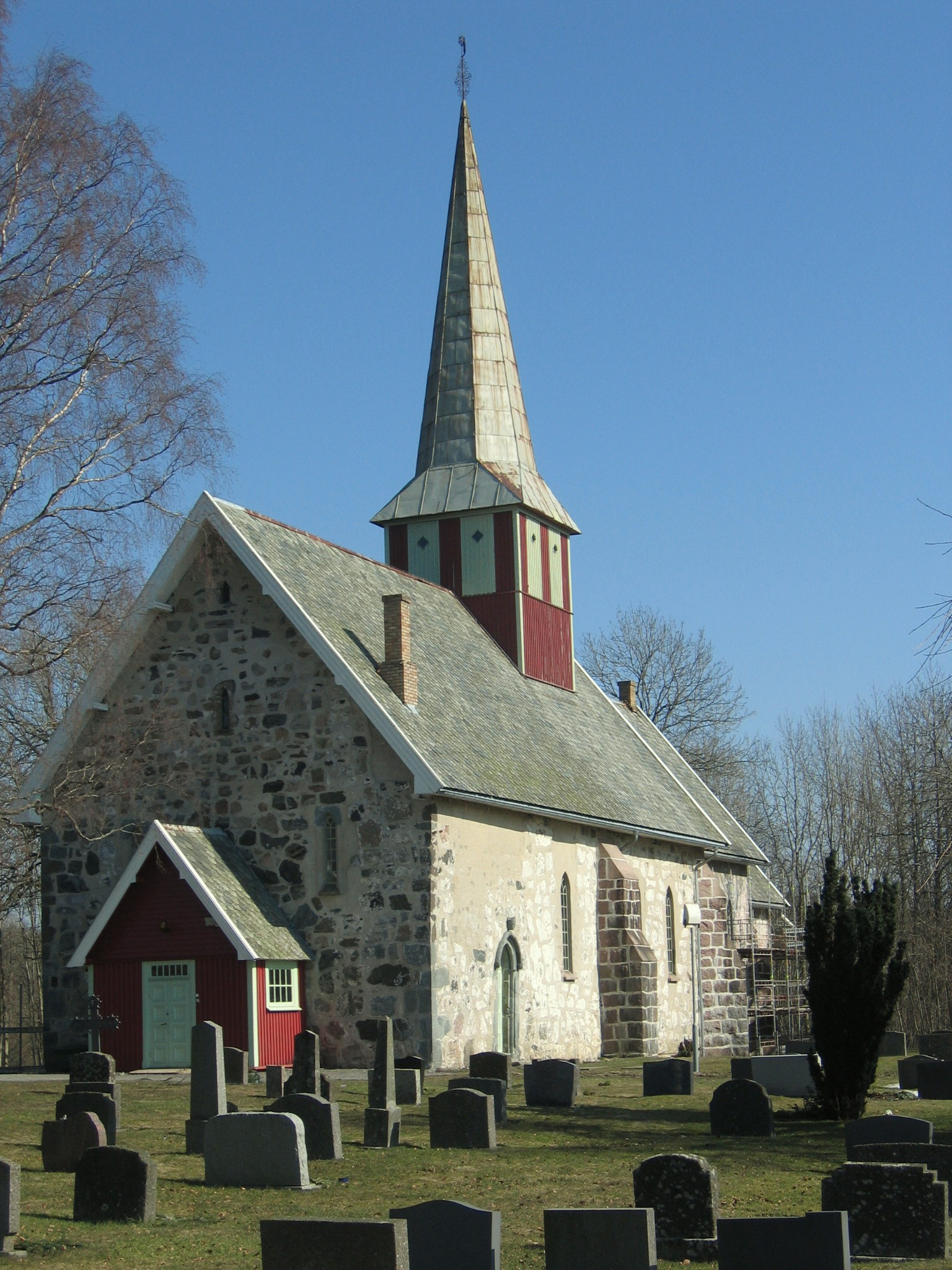
- View of the historic Øyestad Church

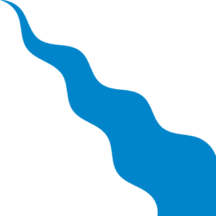
- Flag Coat of arms

- Aust-Agder within Norway

- Øyestad within Aust-Agder
- Coordinates: 58°24′43″N 08°38′55″E
- Country: Norway
- County: Aust-Agder
- District: Østre Agder
- Established: 1 Jan 1838
  - Created as: Formannskapsdistrikt
- Disestablished: 1 Jan 1992
  - Succeeded by: Arendal Municipality
- Administrative centre: Bjorbekk

Government
  - Mayor (1976–1991): Einar Livolden (Sp)

Area (upon dissolution)
  - Total: 93.1 km^{2} (35.9 sq mi)
  - Rank: #394 in Norway
- Highest elevation: 268.61 m (881.3 ft)

Population (1991)
  - Total: 8,679
  - Rank: #116 in Norway
  - Density: 93.2/km^{2} (241/sq mi)
  - Change (10 years): ▲ +8%
- Demonym: Øyestadsokning

Official language
  - Norwegian form: Neutral
- Time zone: UTC+01:00 (CET)
  - Summer (DST): UTC+02:00 (CEST)
- ISO 3166 code: NO-0920

Øyestad is a former municipality in the old Aust-Agder county, Norway. The 93.1-square-kilometre (35.9 sq mi) municipality existed from 1838 until its dissolution in 1992. The area is now part of Arendal Municipality in the traditional district of Østre Agder in Agder county. The administrative centre was the village of Bjorbekk near the Bjorbekk Church.

Prior to its dissolution in 1992, the 93.1-square-kilometre (35.9 sq mi) municipality was the 394th largest by area out of the 448 municipalities in Norway. Øyestad Municipality was the 116th most populous municipality in Norway with a population of about 8,679. The municipality's population density was 93.2 inhabitants per square kilometre (241/sq mi) and its population had increased by 8% over the previous 10-year period.

== General information ==
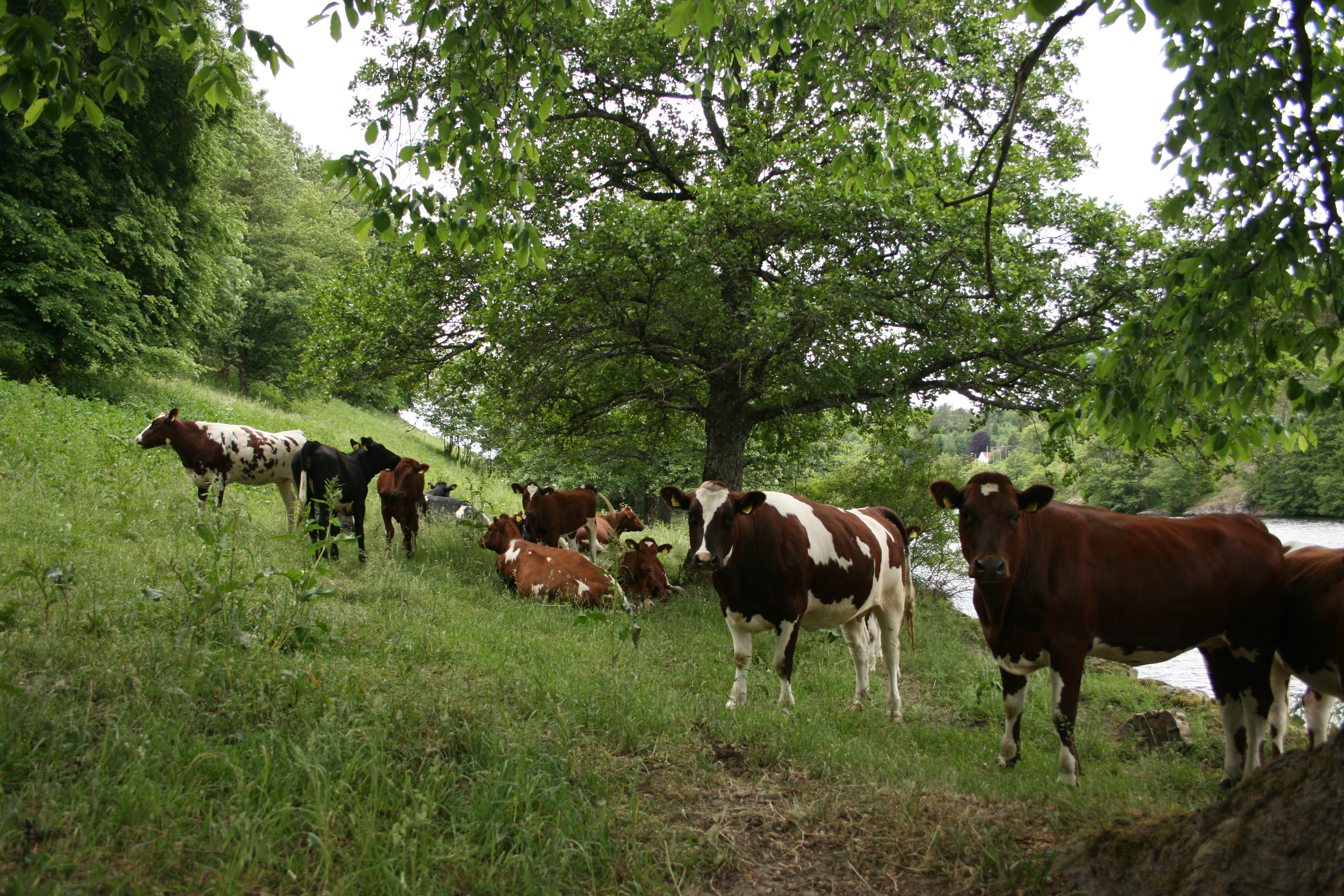
A farm in Øyestad

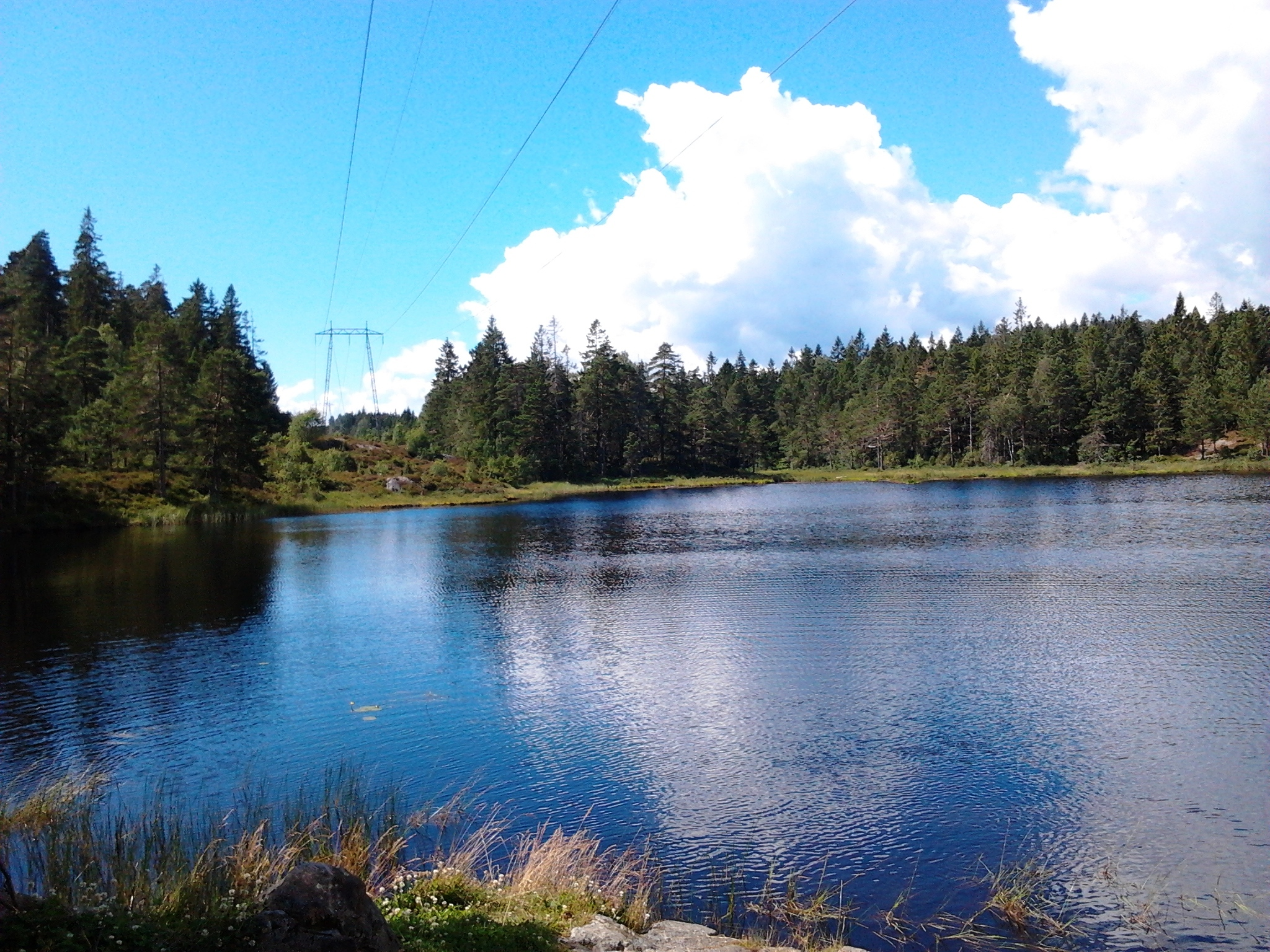
View of the Gjennestadkjenna in Øyestad

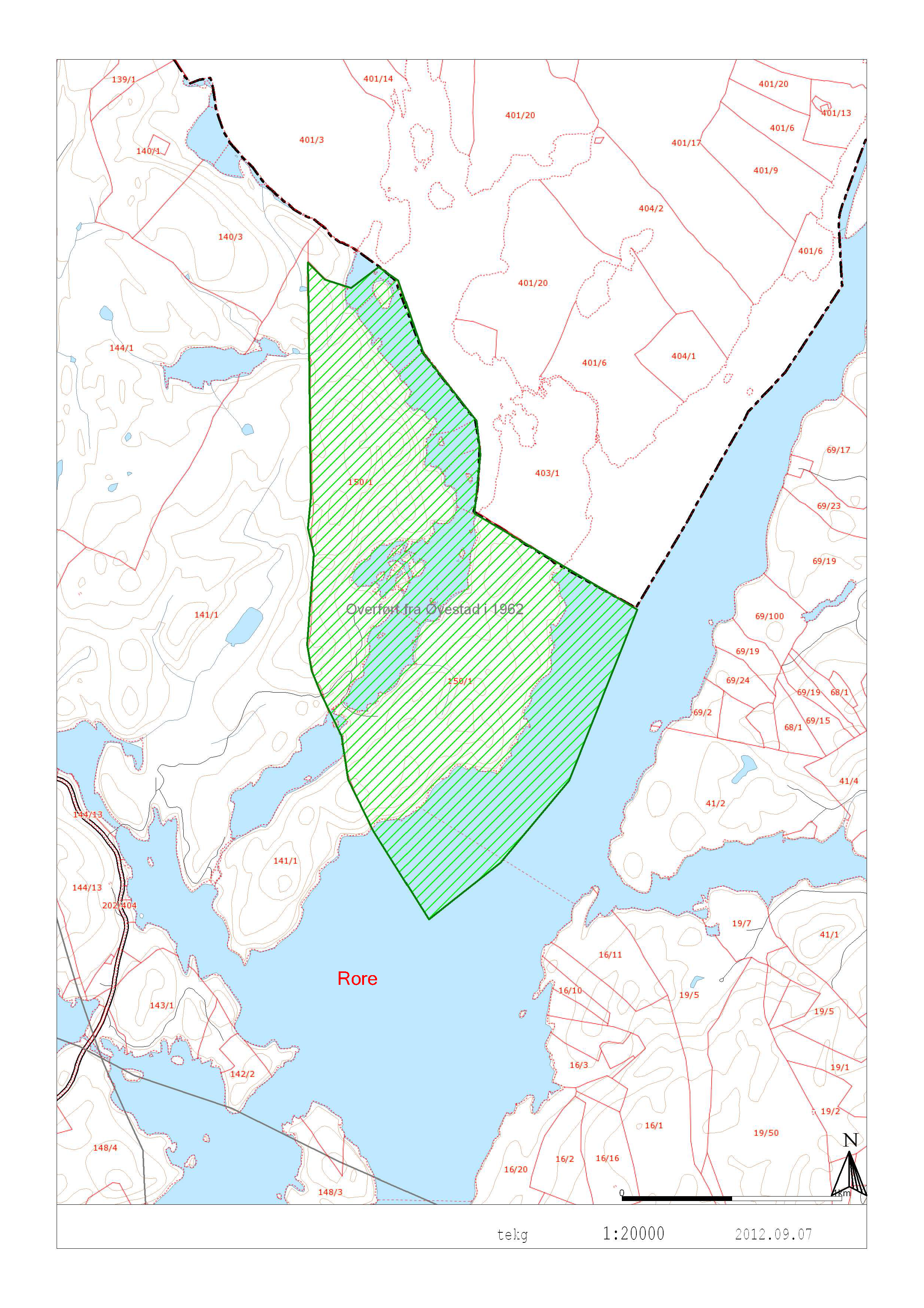
Map of the Salvestjønn area that was transferred from Øyestad to Landvik in 1962

The parish of Øiestad (later spelled Øyestad) was established as a municipality on 1 January 1838 (see formannskapsdistrikt law). In 1846, Øiestad Municipality was divided as follows: the southern district (population: 2,806) became the new Fjære Municipality and the northern district (population: 5,215) continued as a smaller Øiestad Municipality. In 1850, Øiestad Municipality was again divided as follows: the northern district (population: 1,976) became the new Froland Municipality and the southern district (population: 5,215) continued as a smaller Øiestad Municipality.

On 1 January 1875, a small rural area of the town of Arendal was removed from the town and split between two neighboring municipalities: the western part (population: 52) was transferred to Øiestad Municipality and the eastern part (population: 22) was transferred to Østre Moland Municipality. On 1 January 1881, Øiestad Municipality was divided as follows: the eastern island district (population: 2,652) became the new Hisø Municipality and the western district (population: 4,474) continued as a smaller Øiestad Municipality. In 1936, an area of Øyestad Municipality (population: 33) was transferred to the neighboring Austre Moland Municipality.

During the 1960s, there were many municipal mergers and border adjustments across Norway due to the work of the Schei Committee. On 1 January 1964, the unpopulated Salvestjønn area in Øyestad Municipality was transferred to the neighboring Landvik Municipality.

On 1 January 1992, Øyestad Municipality was dissolved and the following areas were merged to form an enlarged Arendal Municipality:

- all of Øyestad Municipality (population: 8,679)
- all of Arendal Municipality (population: 12,478)
- all of Hisøy Municipality (population: 4,026)
- all of Moland Municipality (population: 8,148)
- all of Tromøy Municipality (population: 4,711)

=== Name ===
The municipality (originally the parish) is named after the old Øiestad farm (Old Norse: Øyjarsstaðir) since the first Øyestad Church was built there. The first element is the genitive case of the male name Øyjarr. The last element is the plural form of staðr which means "abode" or "homestead".

Historically, the name of the municipality was spelled Øiestad. On 3 November 1917, a royal resolution changed the spelling of the name of the municipality to Øyestad.

=== Coat of arms ===
The coat of arms was granted on 19 April 1985 and it was in use until the dissolution of the municipality on 1 January 1992. The official blazon is "Argent, a pile issuant from base sinister wavy azure" (Norwegian: I sølv en skråstilt blå spiss dannet ved bølgesnitt). This means the arms have a field (background) with a tincture of argent which means it is commonly colored white, but if it is made out of metal, then silver is used. The charge is a pile (triangular figure) with wavy edges that runs diagonally across the arms. The design is meant to represent the local river Nidelva as it runs from the mountains into the fjord as it passes through the municipality as it widens as it approaches the sea. The river has played an important role in the local economy. The arms were designed by Ulf Skauge.

=== Churches ===
The Church of Norway had one parish (sokn) within Øyestad Municipality. At the time of the municipal dissolution, it was part of the Øyestad prestegjeld and the Aust-Nedenes prosti (deanery) in the Diocese of Agder.

Churches in Øyestad Municipality
Parish (sokn)	Church name	Location of the church	Year built
Øyestad	Øyestad Church	Rykene	c. 1200
Øyestad	Nedenesengene Chapel	Nedenes	1849
Øyestad	Øyestad Chapel	Bjorbekk	1884

== Geography ==
At the time of its dissolution, Øyestad Municipality encompassed most of the coastline between the towns of Grimstad and Arendal, along with the forested areas along the Nidelva river heading inland. Back in 1838 when the municipality was established, however, the municipality was far larger in size. The highest point in the municipality was the 268.61-metre (881.3 ft) tall mountain Høgsteinsheia, located on the northwestern border with Froland Municipality.

Froland Municipality was located to the north, Moland Municipality was located to the northeast, Arendal Municipality was located to the east, Hisøy Municipality was located to the southeast, Grimstad Municipality was located to the south and west, and Birkenes Municipality was located to the northwest.

== Government ==
While it existed, Øyestad Municipality was responsible for primary education (through 10th grade), outpatient health services, senior citizen services, welfare and other social services, zoning, economic development, and municipal roads and utilities. The municipality was governed by a municipal council of directly elected representatives. The mayor was indirectly elected by a vote of the municipal council. The municipality was under the jurisdiction of the Nedenes District Court and the Agder Court of Appeal.

=== Municipal council ===
The municipal council (Kommunestyre) of Øyestad Municipality was made up of 33 representatives that were elected to four year terms. The tables below show the historical composition of the council by political party.

Øyestad kommunestyre 1987–1991
Party name (in Norwegian)	Number of representatives
Labour Party (Arbeiderpartiet)	15
Progress Party (Fremskrittspartiet)	3
Conservative Party (Høyre)	5
Christian Democratic Party (Kristelig Folkeparti)	4
Centre Party (Senterpartiet)	4
Joint list of the Liberal Party (Venstre) and Liberal People's Party (Liberale Folkepartiet)	2
Total number of members:	33
Note: On 1 January 1992, Øyestad Municipality became part of Arendal Municipality.

Øyestad kommunestyre 1983–1987
Party name (in Norwegian)	Number of representatives
Labour Party (Arbeiderpartiet)	16
Progress Party (Fremskrittspartiet)	2
Conservative Party (Høyre)	6
Christian Democratic Party (Kristelig Folkeparti)	4
Centre Party (Senterpartiet)	4
Liberal Party (Venstre)	1
Total number of members:	33

Øyestad kommunestyre 1979–1983
Party name (in Norwegian)	Number of representatives
Labour Party (Arbeiderpartiet)	15
Progress Party (Fremskrittspartiet)	1
Conservative Party (Høyre)	8
Christian Democratic Party (Kristelig Folkeparti)	4
Centre Party (Senterpartiet)	4
Liberal Party (Venstre)	1
Total number of members:	33

Øyestad kommunestyre 1975–1979
Party name (in Norwegian)	Number of representatives
Labour Party (Arbeiderpartiet)	11
Conservative Party (Høyre)	4
Christian Democratic Party (Kristelig Folkeparti)	4
New People's Party (Nye Folkepartiet)	1
Centre Party (Senterpartiet)	5
Total number of members:	25

Øyestad kommunestyre 1971–1975
Party name (in Norwegian)	Number of representatives
Labour Party (Arbeiderpartiet)	12
Conservative Party (Høyre)	1
Christian Democratic Party (Kristelig Folkeparti)	2
Centre Party (Senterpartiet)	3
Liberal Party (Venstre)	1
Local List(s) (Lokale lister)	6
Total number of members:	25

Øyestad kommunestyre 1967–1971
Party name (in Norwegian)	Number of representatives
Labour Party (Arbeiderpartiet)	11
Conservative Party (Høyre)	1
Christian Democratic Party (Kristelig Folkeparti)	2
Centre Party (Senterpartiet)	3
Liberal Party (Venstre)	3
List of workers, fishermen, and small farmholders (Arbeidere, fiskere, småbrukere liste)	5
Total number of members:	25

Øyestad kommunestyre 1963–1967
Party name (in Norwegian)	Number of representatives
Labour Party (Arbeiderpartiet)	15
Conservative Party (Høyre)	2
Christian Democratic Party (Kristelig Folkeparti)	2
Centre Party (Senterpartiet)	2
Liberal Party (Venstre)	4
Total number of members:	25

Øyestad herredsstyre 1959–1963
Party name (in Norwegian)	Number of representatives
Labour Party (Arbeiderpartiet)	14
Conservative Party (Høyre)	2
Christian Democratic Party (Kristelig Folkeparti)	3
Centre Party (Senterpartiet)	2
Liberal Party (Venstre)	4
Total number of members:	25

Øyestad herredsstyre 1955–1959
Party name (in Norwegian)	Number of representatives
Labour Party (Arbeiderpartiet)	15
Conservative Party (Høyre)	2
Christian Democratic Party (Kristelig Folkeparti)	3
Farmers' Party (Bondepartiet)	2
Liberal Party (Venstre)	3
Total number of members:	25

Øyestad herredsstyre 1951–1955
Party name (in Norwegian)	Number of representatives
Labour Party (Arbeiderpartiet)	14
Joint List(s) of Non-Socialist Parties (Borgerlige Felleslister)	10
Total number of members:	24

Øyestad herredsstyre 1947–1951
Party name (in Norwegian)	Number of representatives
Labour Party (Arbeiderpartiet)	10
Conservative Party (Høyre)	2
Communist Party (Kommunistiske Parti)	1
Farmers' Party (Bondepartiet)	3
Joint list of the Liberal Party (Venstre) and the Radical People's Party (Radikale Folkepartiet)	8
Total number of members:	24

Øyestad herredsstyre 1945–1947
Party name (in Norwegian)	Number of representatives
Labour Party (Arbeiderpartiet)	12
Communist Party (Kommunistiske Parti)	2
Farmers' Party (Bondepartiet)	3
Joint list of the Liberal Party (Venstre) and the Radical People's Party (Radikale Folkepartiet)	6
Local List(s) (Lokale lister)	1
Total number of members:	24

Øyestad herredsstyre 1937–1941*
Party name (in Norwegian)	Number of representatives
Labour Party (Arbeiderpartiet)	11
Farmers' Party (Bondepartiet)	3
Liberal Party (Venstre)	5
Local List(s) (Lokale lister)	5
Total number of members:	24
Note: Due to the German occupation of Norway during World War II, no elections were held for new municipal councils until after the war ended in 1945.

=== Mayors ===
The mayor (Norwegian: ordfører) of Øyestad Municipality was the political leader of the municipality and the chairperson of the municipal council. The following people have held this position:

- 1838–1838: Christian Fredrik Juell
- 1839–1839: Nils Gundersen Skotta
- 1840–1841: Daniel K. Vigeland
- 1842–1843: Kittel Nilsen Solberg
- 1844–1847: Aanon Aanonsen Løddestøl
- 1848–1849: Peder Terkelsen Tingstveit
- 1850–1853: Terje Johnsen Nedenes
- 1854–1857: Peder Terkelsen Tingstveit
- 1858–1861: Terje Johnsen Nedenes
- 1862–1863: Johannes Nilsen Løddestøl
- 1864–1865: Peder A. Johnsen Nedenes
- 1866–1869: Johannes Nilsen Løddestøl
- 1870–1873: Anders Terjesen Stener
- 1874–1875: Ole O. Asdal
- 1876–1877: Johannes Nilsen Løddestøl
- 1878–1879: Svenning Gregertsen Solberg
- 1880–1883: Ole Nilsen Huseland
- 1884–1891: Mikael O. Løddestøl
- 1892–1895: Daniel A. Wigeland
- 1896–1897: Kittel Ribe
- 1898–1901: Mikael O. Løddestøl (V)
- 1902–1907: Finn Blakstad (H)
- 1908–1913: K. Fosse (V)
- 1914–1931: Gunnar Sætra (V/Bp)
- 1932–1933: Kittel Jensen
- 1934–1937: Johan G. Væding
- 1938–1939: Tarald Haugaasdal
- 1939–1942: Knut Josefsen (Ap)
- 1943–1945: Olav Johansen (NS)
- 1945–1947: Knut Josefsen (Ap)
- 1948–1951: Bertin Christensen Røed (V)
- 1952–1959: Knut Josefsen (Ap)
- 1960–1964: Olav Dale (V)
- 1964–1967: Jørgen Slettevold (Ap)
- 1968–1971: Jens M. Jensen (KrF)
- 1972–1975: Steffen Nesland (Ap)
- 1976–1991: Einar Livolden (Sp)

== Attractions ==
=== Øyestad Church ===
Øyestad Church (Øyestad kirke) is a medieval, Gothic nave church. The church built in stone with 300 seats. Dating is uncertain, but it is generally assumed that it was built around the year 1200. The congregation celebrated the church's 800th anniversary in 2000. Øyestad was formerly the main church for several parishes: Øyestad, Fjære, Grimstad, Froland, and Hisøy. The church was damaged by fire in 1900. The choir, sacristy, tower, altarpiece and pulpit were destroyed along with the paintings on the walls. The church was restored and rededicated in 1902. In 2008, the church underwent extensive restoration.

== Notable people ==
- Peter Munch Brager (born 1806), the vicar of Øyestad Church
- Brit Hoel (born 1942), a politician
- Niels Rosenkrantz (1757−1824), a diplomat and prime minister of Denmark-Norway

== See also ==
- List of former municipalities of Norway
