= Björn Meyer =

Swedish bassist and composer (born 1965)

- Born: 5 September 1965 (age 60); Stockholm, Sweden
- Origin: Sweden
- Genres: Jazz, Ambient, World, Alternative
- Occupations: Bassist, composer
- Instruments: Electric Bass guitar, Acoustic bass guitar, Bass mandola
- Labels: ECM Records
- Website: www.bjornmeyer.com

Björn Meyer (born 5 September 1965 in Stockholm, Sweden) is a Swedish bassist and composer.

== Biography ==
Meyer started playing the piano as a child, learned the trumpet in the Swedish youth music school, sang in a boys-choir and played guitar in local punk bands. At the age of 18, he switched to the electric bass and - after completing his studies in computer science and physics - started working as a professional musician in 1989. In 1996 he moved to Switzerland.

Together with the Nyckelharpa player Johan Hedin and the percussionist Fredrik Gille he co-founded the Swedish trio Bazar Blå in Sweden in 1996.

In 2002 he co-founded the musicians network and CD Label Bazaarpool with the Persian harpist Asita Hamidi. Until her death in 2012, he was also active in their many mutual projects such as Asita Hamidi's Bazaar, "Garden of Silence" and Bazaaris.

Since 2008 Meyer works with Anouar Brahem (The Astounding Eyes of Rita - 2009, Souvenance - 2014) and was for more than a decade - from the beginning until 2012 - also a member of the ritual groove collective of Nik Bärtsch's RONIN and helped shape the term Zen Funk.

In 2013 he founded the trio Amiira with Samuel Rohrer on drums and Klaus Gesing on bass clarinet and soprano saxophone. In 2014 a long time collaboration with Mats Eser and Ania Losinger — with her self invented instrument Xala — resulted in the formation of NEN also featuring drummer Chrigel Bosshard.

Meyer also works regularly with the Swiss composer and reed player Don Li and is an occasional guest lecturer at the conservatories in Stockholm, Zurich, Bern, Lucerne and Lausanne.

His first solo album "Provenance" was released on ECM in autumn 2017.

== Discography ==
- Björn Meyer Solo: Convergence (ECM Records, 2026)
- Björn Meyer Solo: Provenance (ECM Records, 2017)
- Bazar Blå (with Johan Hedin, Fredrik Gille): Twenty (bazaarpool, 2016)
- Klaus Gesing, Björn Meyer, Samuel Rohrer: Amiira (Arjunamusic, 2016)
- Anouar Brahem: Souvenance (ECM Records, 2014)
- Deepsouth (with Dave Ledbetter, Ronan Skillen): Heartland (2015)
- Christian Niederer's PLAN: Jack (Unit Records, 2014)
- Nik Bärtsch's Ronin: Live (ECM Records, 2012)
- Nik Bärtsch's Ronin: Llyria (ECM Records, 2010)
- Anouar Brahem Quartett: The Astounding Eyes Of Rita (ECM Records, 2009)
- Asita Hamidi's Bazaar: S.W.E.N (bazaarpool, 2009)
- Bazar Blå: Lost (bazaarpool, 2009)
- Nik Bärtsch's Ronin: Holon (ECM Records, 2007)
- Asita Hamidi's Bazaar: Live (bazaarpool, 2006)
- bazaarpool, various: in film and music (bazaarpool, 2006)
- Bazaaris: Watersongs (bazaarpool, 2006)
- Nik Bärtsch's Ronin: Stoa (ECM Records, 2006)
- Asita Hamidi's Bazaar: Blue Ark (bazaarpool, 2004)
- Bazar Blå: Nysch (bazaarpool, 2004)
- Bazar Blå: Live (bazaarpool, 2003)
- Asita Hamidi's Bazaar: Åjné (EMI Switzerland, 2002)
- Tonus-Music Research Result: Live Vol 1 (Tonus-Music, 2002)
- Tonus-Music Research Result: Live Vol 2 (Tonus-Music, 2002)
- Patrik Lerjen's Three Base Hit: Incoming Message (AM, 2001)
- Bazar Blå: Tripfolk (Xource, 2000)
- Asita Hamidi's Bazaar: Nafâs (EMI Switzerland, 1999)
- Don Pfäffli's Tonus (Don Li): Gen (Tonus-Music, 1999)
- Bazar Blå: Nordic City (Xource, 1998)
- Snag (with Stephen Magnusson, Julien Wilson, Sergio Beresovsky): Heaps (1998)
- Snag (with Stephen Magnusson, Julien Wilson, Sergio Beresovsky): Hey, Guess what? (1998)
- Don Pfäffli's Tonus (Don Li): Suun (Brambus, 1997)

== Sources ==
- Bruno Spoerri: Biografisches Lexikon des Schweizer Jazz CD-Beilage zu: B. Spoerri (Hrsg.): Jazz in der Schweiz. Geschichte und Geschichten. Chronos, Zürich 2005, ISBN 3-0340-0739-6.
