= Stoa (disambiguation) =

A stoa is a covered walkway or portico. Stoa or STOA may also refer to:

== People ==
- Johan Støa (politician) (1913–1973), Norwegian politician
- Johan Støa (sportsperson) (1900–1991), Norwegian sportsman
- Ryan Stoa (born 1987), American ice hockey player
- Tom Stoa (born 1951), American politician

== Places ==
- Stoa, Norway, a village in Arendal municipality in Aust-Agder county, Norway
- Støa, a village in Trysil municipality in Hedmark county, Norway

== Other ==
- Stoa (album), an album by Nik Bärtsch
- Science and Technology Options Assessment, a committee of members of the European Parliament
- Stoa USA, a Christian homeschool forensics organization in the United States
- Stoicism, a school of Hellenistic philosophy also known as the Stoa

== See also ==
- List of stoae
