= Øyestad =

Øyestad may refer to:

== Places ==
- Øyestad Municipality, a former municipality in the old Aust-Agder county, Norway
- Øyestad Church, a church in Arendal Municipality in Agder county, Norway
- Øyestad, Østfold, a village in Sarpsborg Municipality in Østfold county, Norway

== Other ==
- Øyestad IF, a sports club based in Arendal Municipality in Agder county, Norway
