= Aer (album) =

Studio album by Nik Bärtsch's Mobile
- Released: 2004
- Recorded: August 2003
- Studio: Radiostudio Zürich
- Genre: Jazz
- Length: 39:46
- Labels: Tonus Music; TON 016
- Producer: Nik Bärtsch

Nik Bärtsch chronology
Rea (2004)	Aer (2004)	Stoa (2006)

Aer is an album by Swiss pianist and composer Nik Bärtsch's band Mobile recorded in Zürich in 2003 and first released on the Tonus Music label in 2004.

== Reception ==
On All About Jazz Budd Kopman noted "Mobile as a group has a slightly different focus than Ronin. The music has more of the "ritual" in it and less of the "groove." While repetition comes more to center stage, development is not forgotten, and static feeling that grows over time is balanced by addition, subtraction or mutation".

== Track listing ==
No.	Title	Length
1.	"Modul 29"	8:01
2.	"Modul 16"	11:02
3.	"Modul 18"	4:48
4.	"Modul 20"	3:07
5.	"Modul 26"	2:06
6.	"Modul 8_11"	10:42

== Personnel ==
- Nik Bärtsch – piano
- Sha – bass clarinet, alto saxophone
- Mats Eser – marimba, percussion
- Kaspar Rast – drums
