= Awase (album) =

Studio album by Nik Bärtsch's Ronin
- Released: 4 May 2018
- Recorded: October 2017
- Studios: Studios la Buissonne; Pernes-les-Fontaines
- Genre: Jazz
- Length: 65:19
- Label: ECM 2603
- Producer: Manfred Eicher

Nik Bärtsch chronology
Continuum (2016)	Awase (2018)	Entendre (2021)

Awase is an album by Nik Bärtsch's Ronin recorded in France in October 2017 and released by ECM in May 2018. The quartet features Sha on reeds while Thomy Jordi and Kaspar Rast were on the rhythm section

== Reception ==
Professional ratings
Review scores
Source	Rating
All About Jazz	4.5/5 stars
AllMusic	4/5 stars
PopMatters	8/10 stars

The PopMatters review by John Garratt noted "Ronin is now a quartet. Percussionist Andi Pupato has left, leaving Kaspar Rast to handle all of the drumming duties. Bassist Björn Meyer has been replaced by Thomy Jordi, meaning that the number of strings used on that particular instrument has dropped by two. The band had to re-train themselves to produce that tight-as-a-knot sound they were already known for. That led to some pleasant discoveries along the way.... The fact that three of Awase's six tracks pulled from Nik Bärtsch's past could give the false impression that he and Ronin are suffering from a creative drought. For other bands, that may be the case. Ronin vibrates on another frequency, where retooling an old song is just as refreshing to the ear as writing a whole new one. Slow evolution is still evolution."

AllMusic's Thom Jurek states, "Awase reveals Bärtsch's aesthetic methodology as instantly recognizable to anyone who has heard it before. That said, he's also expanded its color, texture, and timbral palettes, bringing a more strident physicality into Ronin's skeletal music and extrapolating it in more readily accessible harmonic compositions—without sacrificing the layers of mystery in its heart."

All About Jazz's Mike Jurkovic said, "Play with our heads the music does, though, in a dizzying, grand way, employing simple patterns unconcerned with downbeats or expectations and mantra-like modules (or "Moduls," as Bärtsch chooses to title his works) of sheer minimalist groove that expand, contract and expand again at the whim and will of both composer and players."

Chicago Reader's Peter Margasek observed, "While Awase (ECM) is clearly the product of a leaner combo than that heard on Llyria—with Jordi taking a more rhythmic approach to the bass lines than Meyer—the leader has held fast to his minimalist vision, producing a hypnotic matrix where individual parts move furtively in improvisational flurries. Bartsch calls his work "ritual groove music", and while I'm not sure what the ritual is, there's no missing the groove."

== Track listing ==
No.	Title	Length
1.	"Modul 60"	5:08
2.	"Modul 58"	18:19
3.	""A" (Sha)"	8:23
4.	"Modul 36"	13:37
5.	"Modul 34"	8:51
6.	"Modul 59"	11:01

== Personnel ==
=== Ronin ===
- Nik Bärtsch – piano
- Sha – alto saxophone, bass clarinet
- Thomy Jordi – bass
- Kaspar Rast – drums
