= Rød, Arendal =

Village in Arendal Municipality, Norway

Rød Røed
- Village
- Interactive map of Rød
- Coordinates: 58.4229°N 08.7116°E
- Country: Norway
- Region: Southern Norway
- County: Agder
- District: Østre Agder
- Municipality: Arendal Municipality
- Elevation: 16 m (52 ft)
- Time zone: UTC+01:00 (CET)
  - Summer (DST): UTC+02:00 (CEST)
- Post Code: 4823 Nedenes

Rød is a village in Arendal Municipality in Agder county, Norway. The village is located at the mouth of the river Nidelva on the southwest side of the river, across the river from the villages of Asdal and Vrengen. The village lies along the Norwegian County Road 420, which leads north to the village of His on the island of Hisøya to the north, and the road leads south to the village of Nedenes and onwards towards Grimstad Municipality.
