= Ritual Groove Music =

Studio album by Nik Bärtsch's Mobile
- Released: 2004
- Recorded: September 2000, Radiostudio Zürich
- Genre: Jazz
- Length: 43:51
- Label: Tonus Music; TON 013
- Producer: Nik Bärtsch

Nik Bärtsch chronology
Ritual Groove Music (2004)	Randori (2006)

Ritual Groove Music is the debut album by Swiss pianist, composer, record producer and author r Nik Bärtsch's band Mobile recorded in Switzerland in 2000 and first released on the Tonus Music label in 2004.

== Reception ==
Professional ratings
Review scores
Source	Rating
Allmusic	3.5/5 stars

The Allmusic review by Michael G. Nastos called it "A tip-of-the-iceberg recording, in the figurative and literal sense, one can speculate this is a mere beginning, almost child's play, for what Bärtsch and his crew have in store for the future of his compelling and singularly original music". On All About Jazz Budd Kopman noted "For the most part, the tracks sound spliced together, which only further enhances the trance-like effect the music can have. The album thus sounds like a show with terrific pacing, bringing the listener up and down by changing parameters such as overall pitch and speed of the figures".

== Track listing ==
All compositions by Nik Bärtsch

1. "Modul 5" – 8:56
2. "Modul 11" – 9:20
3. "Modul 4" – 3:53
4. "Modul 12" – 5:41
5. "Modul 4II" – 0:46
6. "Modul 2" – 7:07
7. "Modul 12II" – 8:02

== Personnel ==
- Nik Bärtsch — piano, prepared piano
- Don Li – bass clarinet, alto saxophone
- Mats Eser – marimba, percussion
- Kaspar Rast – drums
