= Stoa, Norway =

Village in Arendal Municipality, Norway

Stoa
- Village
- Interactive map of Stoa
- Coordinates: 58.46407°N 8.71744°E
- Country: Norway
- Region: Southern Norway
- County: Agder
- District: Østre Agder
- Municipality: Arendal Municipality
- Elevation: 41 m (135 ft)
- Time zone: UTC+01:00 (CET)
  - Summer (DST): UTC+02:00 (CEST)
- Post Code: 4848 Arendal

Stoa is an industrial village and a business area in Arendal Municipality in Agder county, Norway. The village is located along the European route E18 highway and along the Arendalsbanen railway line. It sits about 3 kilometres (1.9 mi) west of the centre of the town of Arendal. The villages of Bjorbekk and Vrengen each lie a short distance to the south.
