= Randori (album) =

Studio album by Nik Bärtsch's Ronin
- Released: 2002
- Recorded: December 10–12, 2001
- Studios: Tonus Music Labor, Bern
- Genre: Jazz
- Length: 78:11
- Labels: Tonus Music; TON 004
- Producer: Nik Bärtsch's Ronin

Nik Bärtsch chronology
Ritual Groove Music (2004)	Randori (2002)	Hishiryo: Piano Solo (2002)

Randori is an album by Swiss pianist and composer Nik Bärtsch's band Ronin recorded in Switzerland in 2001 and first released on the Tonus Music label in 2002.

== Reception ==
On All About Jazz Budd Kopman noted "Listening to this would be deliciously unbearable in a live setting since you might not know whether to open your arms to the infinite or bang your head, but maybe that is also the point".

== Track listing ==
All compositions by Nik Bärtsch.

1. "Modul 15" – 9:23
2. "Modul 8_9 I" – 6:03
3. "Modul 8_9 II" – 5:51
4. "Modul 8_9 III" – 17:15
5. "Modul 10" – 10:08
6. "Modul 13" – 12:12
7. "Modul 14" – 4:58
8. "Modul 11" – 7:59
9. "Modul 15_9" – 4:22

== Personnel ==
- Nik Bärtsch – prepared piano, synthesizer, electric piano, drums
- Björn Meyer – bass
- Kaspar Rast – drums, udu
- Andi Pupato – shaker, Indian bells
