= Holon (Nik Bärtsch album) =

Studio album by Nik Bärtsch's Ronin
- Released: 2008
- Recorded: July 2007
- Studio: Studios la Buissonne; Pernes-les-Fontaines, France
- Genre: Jazz
- Length: 55:37
- Label: ECM; ECM 2049
- Producer: Manfred Eicher

Nik Bärtsch chronology
Stoa (2005)	Holon (2008)	Llyrìa (2010)

Holon is an album by Swiss pianist and composer Nik Bärtsch's band Ronin recorded in France in July 2007 and released on ECM the following year.

== Reception ==
Professional ratings
Review scores
Source	Rating
AllMusic	4/5 stars

The AllMusic review by Thom Jurek states "The most beautiful thing about Holon is how "live" it all feels. You can see in the mind's eye and fully hear this music in a setting where an audience is urging the band on, not just listening, but moving. How much better does it get than that? The more things stay the same in Ronin, the more they change."

== Track listing ==
No.	Title	Length
1.	"Modul 42"	6:29
2.	"Modul 41_17"	14:51
3.	"Modul 39_8"	7:49
4.	"Modul 46"	7:16
5.	"Modul 45"	9:41
6.	"Modul 44"	9:23

== Personnel ==
- Nik Bärtsch – piano, electric piano
- Sha – alto saxophone, bass clarinet, contrabass clarinet
- Björn Meyer – 6-string bass
- Kaspar Rast – drums
- Andi Pupato – percussion
