= Continuum (Nik Bärtsch album) =

Studio album by Nik Bärtsch's Mobile
- Released: April 22, 2016
- Recorded: March 2015
- Studio: Auditorio Stelio Molo RSI, Lugano
- Genre: Jazz
- Length: 68:19
- Label: ECM; ECM 2464
- Producer: Manfred Eicher

Nik Bärtsch chronology
Nik Bärtsch's Ronin Live (2012)	Continuum (2016)	Awase (2018)

Continuum is an album by Swiss pianist and composer Nik Bärtsch's Mobile recorded in Switzerland in 2015 and released 2016 on the ECM label.

== Reception ==
Professional ratings
Review scores
Source	Rating
AllMusic	4/5 stars
PopMatters	7/10 stars
All About Jazz	4/5 stars

The AllMusic review by Thom Jurek states "Continuum is European jazz rife with funkiness; it's just more specific sound. It may require a closer listen, at least initially, but once experienced, its depth and constancy are unmistakable". They also selected it as one of their Favorite Jazz Albums of 2016.

PopMatters' John Garratt said "While their playing can be every bit as spritely as Ronin, Continuum captures Mobile in a low, pensive light. This isn’t to say that the music isn’t as successful overall, it’s just that establishing a warm sense of intimacy with it is going to take a little work on your part".

All About Jazz reviewers said, "With its variety of styles, Continuum is the best of Mobile's albums to date, despite the very high bar set from the beginning" and "there's little doubt that those who've become fans of Ronin's more eminently groove-laden music will be (if they weren't already) ready for this group's richer compositional rigor...for whom the term Continuum is, indeed, wholly appropriate for its broader-spectrum'd musical treasures".

London Jazz News' John L. Walters noted "Bärtsch's music is always urgent but never in a hurry, and his sidemen follow the leader’s calm self-discipline. What improvisation there is takes place within the broad structures of the compositions – Mobile may not be a ‘blowing’ band in the jazz sense of the word, but it interprets the music as if it were".

In JazzTimes, Steve Greenlee wrote "There is a clean, icy quality to this music — a hallmark of Scandinavian jazz — that invites comparisons to electronica and to the work of Philip Glass and film composer Thomas Newman... Continuum, beginning to end, is mesmerizing".

== Track listing ==
All compositions by Nik Bärtsch.

1. "Modul 29_14" - 8:59
2. "Modul 12" - 9:02
3. "Modul 18" - 8:03
4. "Modul 5" - 8:32
5. "Modul 60" - 9:27
6. "Modul 4" - 5:26
7. "Modul 44" - 10:23
8. "Modul 8_11" - 8:32

== Personnel ==
- Nik Bärtsch – piano
- Sha – bass clarinet, contrabass clarinet
- Kaspar Rast, Nicolas Stocker – drums, percussion
- Etienne Abelin, Ola Sendecki – violin
- David Schnee – viola
- Ambrosius Huber, Solme Hong – cello
