= Rea (album) =

Studio album by Nik Bärtsch's Ronin
- Released: 2004
- Recorded: May 2003
- Studio: Radiostudio Zürich
- Genre: Jazz
- Length: 64:17
- Label: Tonus Music; TON 015
- Producer: Nik Bärtsch

Nik Bärtsch chronology
Live (2004)	Rea (2004)	Aer (2004)

Rea is an album by Swiss pianist and composer Nik Bärtsch's band Ronin recorded in Zürich in 2003 and first released on the Tonus Music label.

== Reception ==
On All About Jazz Budd Kopman noted "Rea has an overall sound in between that of Ronin's Stoa and Mobile's Aer".

== Track listing ==
All compositions by Nik Bärtsch except where noted.

1. "Modul 27" (Andreas Hunziker, Nik Bärtsch, Sha, Thomas Tavano) – 10:05
2. "Modul 22" – 16:38
3. "Modul 18" – 6:45
4. "Modul 26" – 18:14
5. "Modul 23" – 12:35

== Personnel ==
- Nik Bärtsch – electric piano
- Björn Meyer – bass
- Kaspar Rast – drums
- Andi Pupato – percussion
- Sha – bass clarinet (tracks 1 & 4)
- Thomy Geiger – tenor saxophone (track 4)
- Michael Gassmann – trumpet (track 4)
