= Hishiryo: Piano Solo =

Studio album by Nik Bärtsch
- Released: 2006
- Recorded: January 2002, Radiostudio Zürich
- Genre: Jazz
- Length: 41:59
- Label: Tonus Music
- Producer: Nik Bärtsch

Nik Bärtsch chronology
Randori (2002)	Hishiryo: Piano Solo (2006)	Live (2003)

Hishiryo: Solo Piano is a solo album by Swiss pianist and composer Nik Bärtsch recorded in Switzerland in 2002 and first released on the Tonus Music label.

== Reception ==
Professional ratings
Review scores
Source	Rating
Allmusic	4.5/5 stars

The Allmusic review by arwulf arwulf stated "This marvelous set of rituals for prepared piano and percussion is the ideal prologue to Bärtsch's subsequent ensemble realizations. It is highly recommended". On All About Jazz Budd Kopman noted "Hishiryo obviously stands out because the instrumentation is solo piano. However, its main interest is that one can clearly see the results of Bartsch the composer at work. With the exception of moduls "TM" and "6," all of the moduls appear on other, mostly earlier records. We are thus given a fascinating glimpse into the music in its nakedness, before it is arranged for Mobile or Ronin".

== Track listing ==
All compositions by Nik Bärtsch

1. "Modul 8_9" - 6:13
2. "Modul 13" - 7:15
3. "Modul 14" - 3:30
4. "Modul 4" - 5:48
5. "Modul TM" - 2:27
6. "Modul 5" - 6:55
7. "Modul 6" - 4:04
8. "Modul 11" - 5:46

== Personnel ==
- Nik Bärtsch — piano, prepared piano, percussion
