= Peter Munch Brager =

Norwegian priest and politician

Peter Munch Brager (3 January 1806 – March 1869) was a Norwegian priest and politician.

He was elected to the Parliament of Norway in 1845, representing the constituency of Finmarkens Amt. He only served one term.

At that time he was a parish priest in Lenvig Municipality; he was later appointed parish priest in Øiestad Municipality. His son Olmar Ambrosio Nikolai Brager followed in his footsteps as a parish priest.
