= Live (Nik Bärtsch album) =

Ronin Live

Live album by Nik Bärtsch's Ronin
- Released: 2003
- Recorded: May 2002
- Venue: Moods, Zürich and Bee-Flat, Bern
- Genre: Jazz
- Length: 77:59
- Label: Tonus Music; TON 009
- Producer: Nik Bärtsch's Ronin

Nik Bärtsch chronology
Hishiryo: Piano Solo (2002)	Ronin Live (2003)	Rea (2003)

Live is a live album by Swiss pianist and composer Nik Bärtsch's band Ronin recorded in Switzerland in 2002 and first released on the Tonus Music label.

== Reception ==
Professional ratings
Review scores
Source	Rating
Allmusic	3.5/5 stars

The Allmusic review by Michael G. Nastos called it "compelling, commanding, well worth a close listen, and a prelude for things to be heard stateside. This may be a difficult recording to acquire, but worth the search". On All About Jazz Budd Kopman noted "When listening to Live, it becomes clear that, while the feeling of improvisation, of taking off, of winging it, is very strong, where it is happening is frustratingly unclear".

== Track listing ==
All compositions by Nik Bärtsch.

1. "Modul 14" - 13:52
2. "Modul 17" - 9:17
3. "Modul 11" - 12:15
4. "Modul 16" - 11:37
5. "Modul 8_9" - 15:50
6. "Modul 15" - 15:08

== Personnel ==
- Nik Bärtsch – synthesizer, electric piano
- Björn Meyer – bass
- Kaspar Rast - drums
- Andi Pupato – percussion
