= Live (Nik Bärtsch's Ronin album) =

Live album by Nik Bärtsch's Ronin
- Released: September 7, 2012
- Recorded: 2009–2011
- Genre: Jazz
- Length: 107:00
- Label: ECM 2302/03
- Producer: Manfred Eicher

Nik Bärtsch chronology
Llyrìa (2010)	Live (2012)	Continuum (2016)

Live is a live double-album by Swiss pianist Nik Bärtsch's band Ronin recorded in Europe and Japan between 2009 and 2011 and released on ECM in September 2012.

== Reception ==
Professional ratings
Review scores
Source	Rating
PopMatters	8/10 stars

The PopMatters review by John Garratt stated "It’s actually somewhat of a marvel that music this nuanced can be so warm and inviting. It’s also a pleasant surprise that the overall quality of the music holds up for two-plus years of live performances."

Carlo Wolff of JazzTimes observed "There are moments of peace, of near-stasis. But over the course of these long discs, there’s no sag. Expertly sequenced, they unfold like a single concert."

All About Jazz's John Kelman wrote, "Ronin is an exciting and hypnotic live act, with Live demonstrating the full breadth of its intrinsic possibilities."

BBC Music's Sid Smith called it "A hair-raising and dazzling celebration of Ronin’s considerable achievements to date."

== Track listing ==
All tracks are written by Nik Bärtsch.

Disc one
No.	Title	Recording location	Length
1.	"Modul 41_17"	Lörrach	16:38
2.	"Modul 35"	Leipzig	11:31
3.	"Modul 42"	Wien	9:09
4.	"Modul 17"	Tokyo	9:58
5.	"Modul 22"	Amsterdam	14:45

Disc two
No.	Title	Recording location	Length
1.	"Modul 48"	Mannheim	13:11
2.	"Modul 47"	Gateshead	8:37
3.	"Modul 55"	Mannheim	13:11
4.	Untitled	Salzau	10:00

== Personnel ==
- Nik Bärtsch – piano, electric piano
- Sha – alto saxophone, bass clarinet, contrabass clarinet
- Björn Meyer – bass (except track 9)
- Thomy Jordi – bass (track 9)
- Kaspar Rast – drums
- Andi Pupato – percussion
