= Engene Church =

Church in Agder, Norway

- Engene kirke
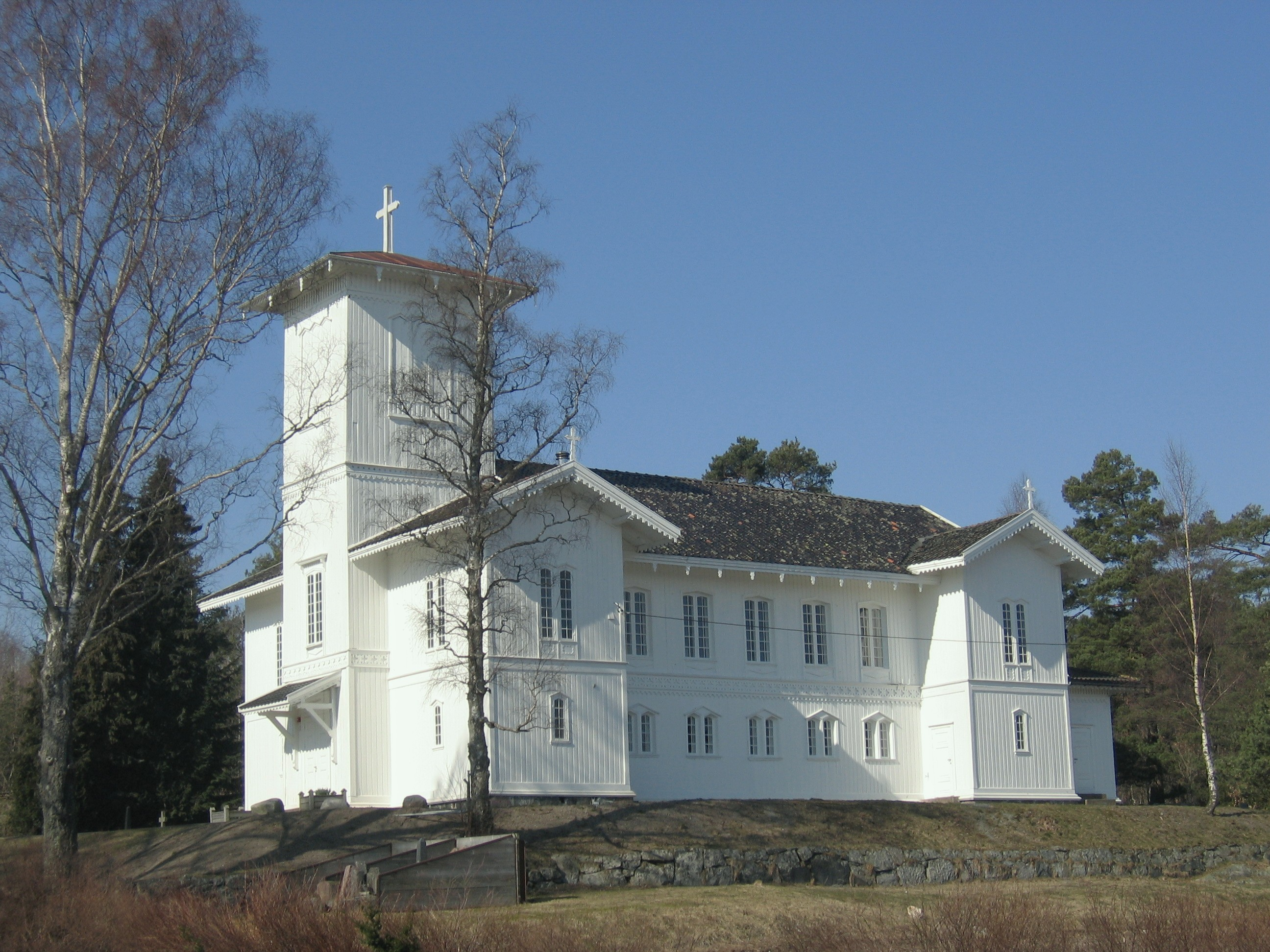
- View of the church
- Engene Church
- 58.4016695°N 08.6931225°E
- Location: Arendal Municipality, Agder
- Country: Norway
- Denomination: Church of Norway
- Churchmanship: Evangelical Lutheran

History
- Former name: Nedenesengene kirke
- Status: Parish church
- Founded: 1882
- Consecrated: 1882

Architecture
- Functional status: Active
- Architect: Wilhelm Hanstein
- Architectural type: Long church
- Completed: 1849 (177 years ago)

Specifications
- Capacity: 480
- Materials: Wood

Administration
- Diocese: Agder og Telemark
- Deanery: Arendal prosti
- Parish: Øyestad
- Norwegian Cultural Heritage Site
- Type: Church
- Status: Listed
- ID: 84096

Engene Church (Norwegian: Engene kirke) is a parish church of the Church of Norway in Arendal Municipality in Agder county, Norway. It is located in the village of Nedenes. It is one of the churches for the Øyestad parish which is part of the Arendal prosti (deanery) in the Diocese of Agder og Telemark. The white, wooden church was built in a long church design in 1882 using plans originally drawn up by the architect Wilhelm Hanstein. The church seats about 480 people.

== History ==
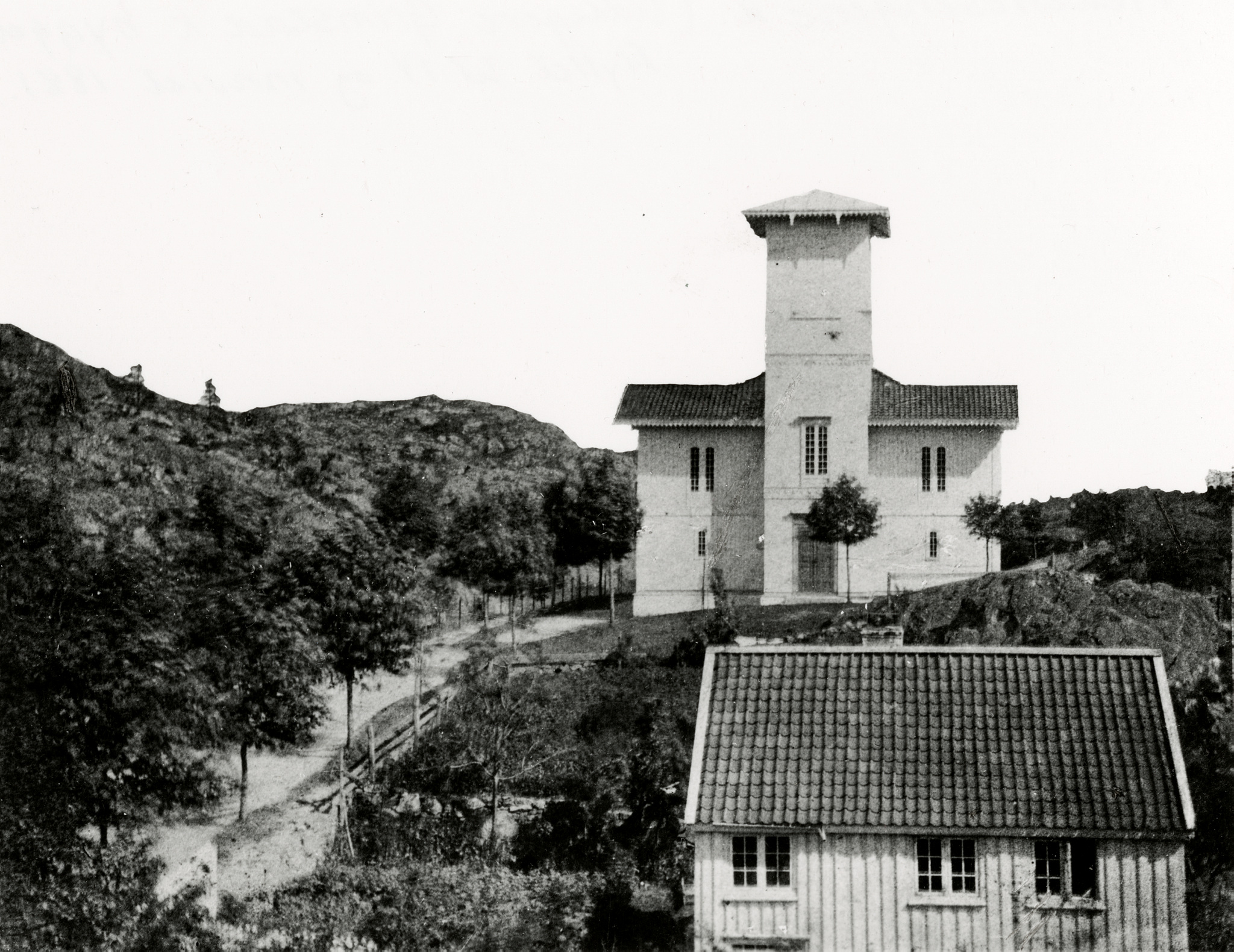
View of the church when it was located in Grimstad (1849–1881)

The church was first built in the town of Grimstad in 1849 using designs by the architect Wilhelm Hanstein where it was called Grimstad Church. It was likely the first church built in Southern Norway in the Swiss chalet style. The church has a large distinctive tower above the main entrance.

In 1881, the town had grown and the church was too small, so it was disassembled and moved to the nearby village of Nedenes and rebuilt there in 1882 as the new "Nedenesengene Church", but its name was later shortened to simply "Engene Church". In 1990, the interior was repainted a gray-violet color following the recommendations from the National Heritage Board since it is believed that was the original color of the church's interior.

== See also ==
- List of churches in Agder og Telemark
