= Nik Bärtsch =

Swiss pianist, composer, and bandleader

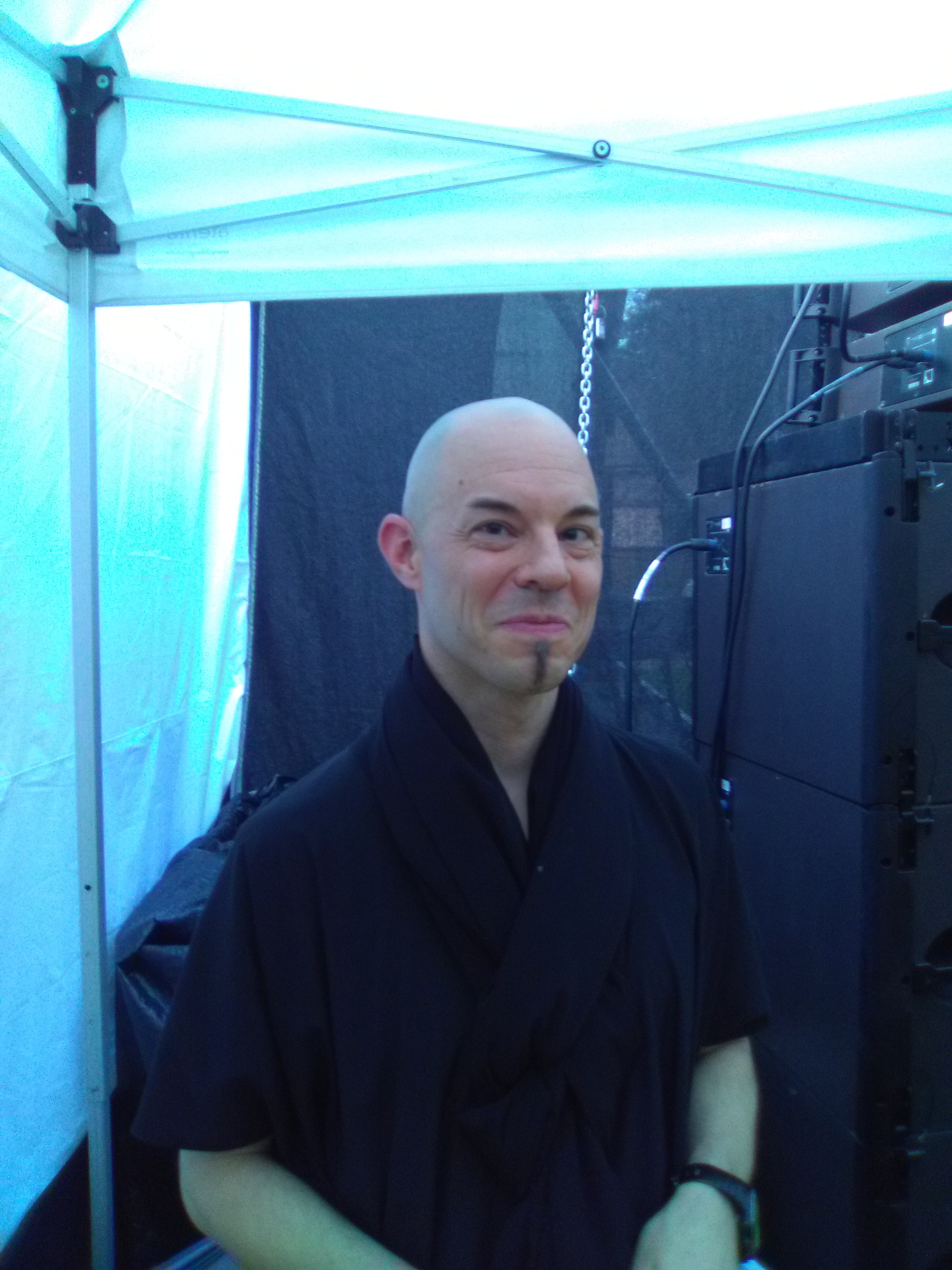
Nik Bärtsch (2016)

Nik Bärtsch (born 3 August 1971) is a Swiss pianist, composer, bandleader, record producer and author from Zürich.

== Career ==
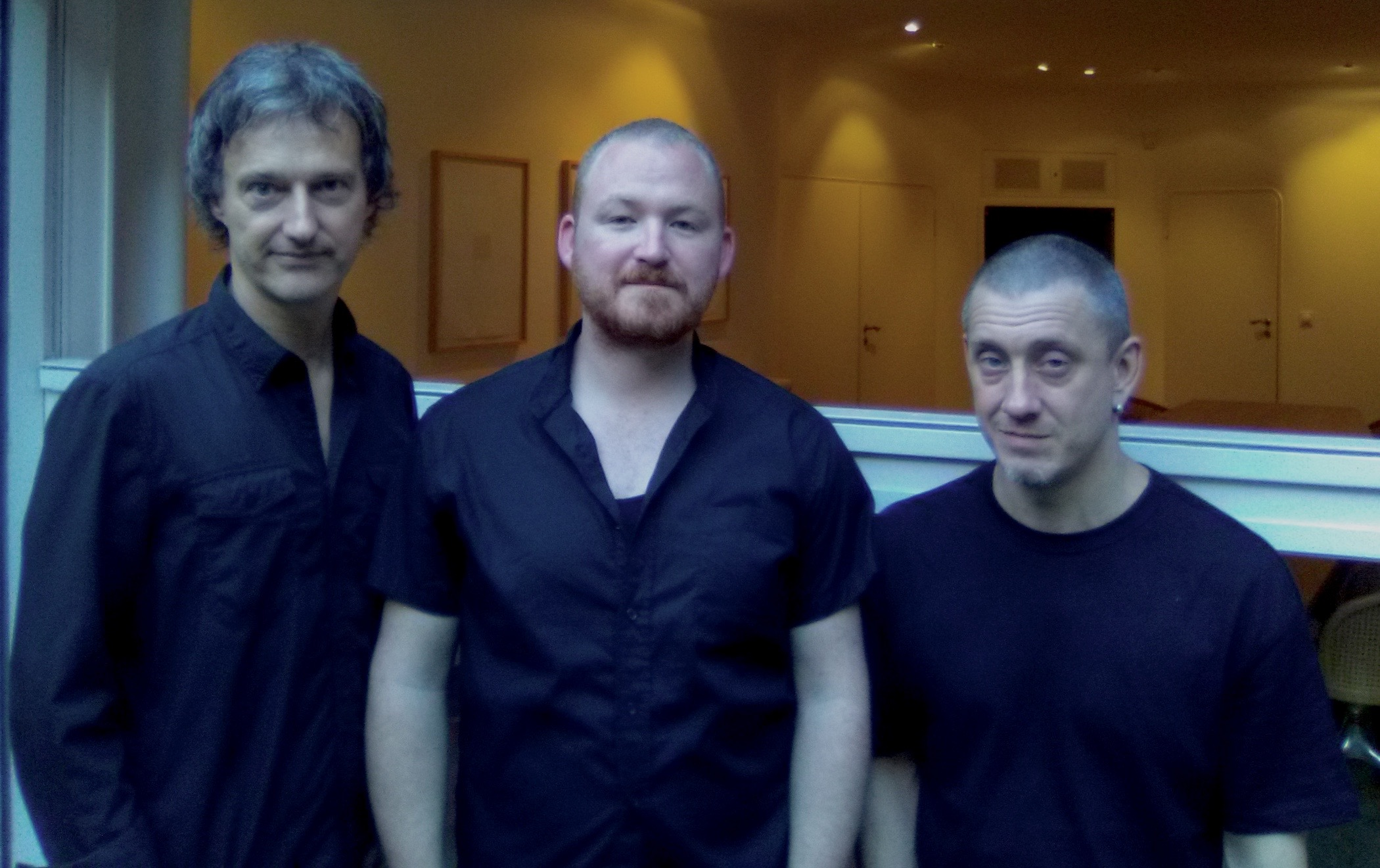
The band Ronin (Thomy Jordi, Sha, Kaspar Rast) 2016

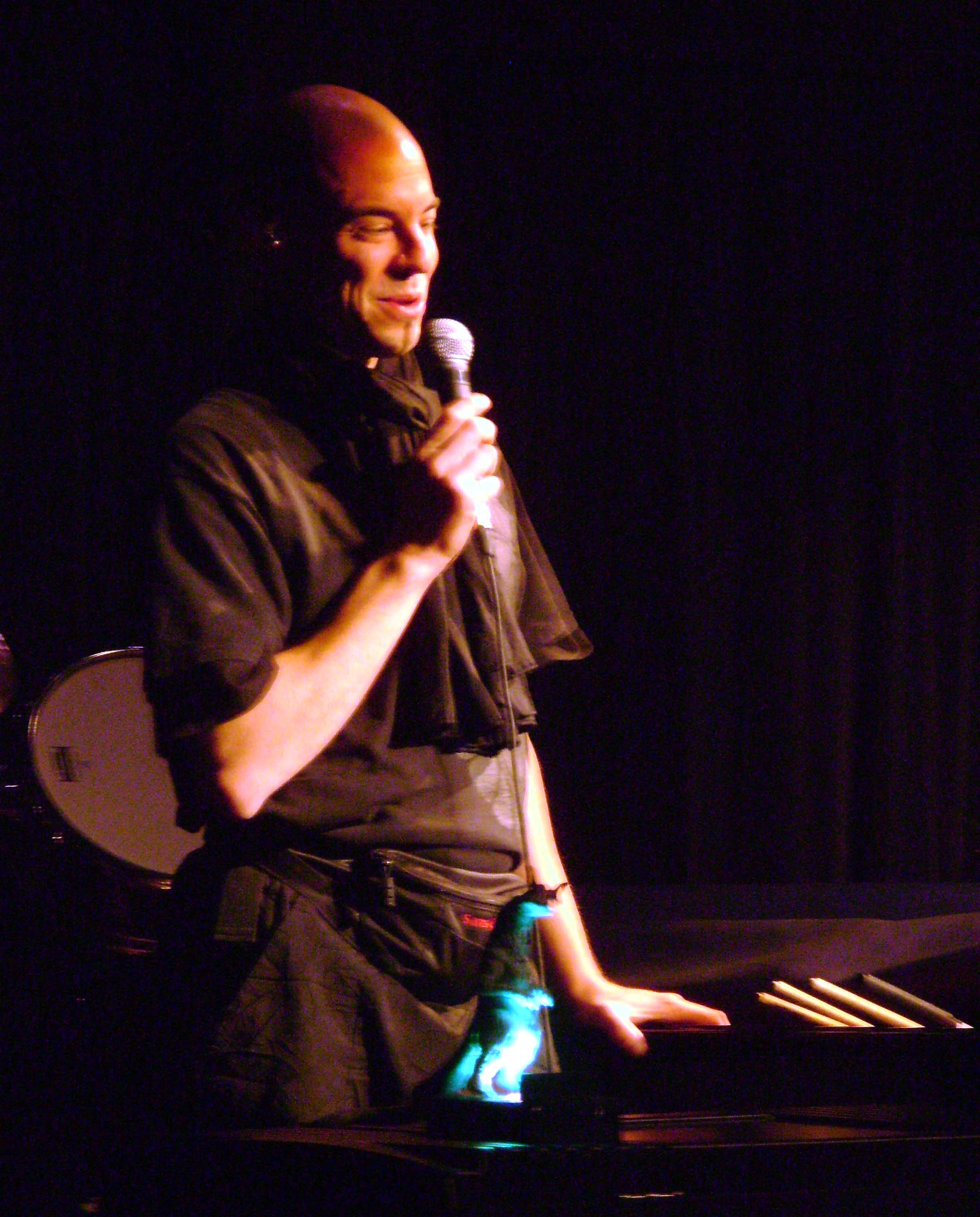
Nik Bärtsch (2008)

Bärtsch studied piano and percussion before the age of ten, prior to his studies at the Academy of Music, he was taught for 5 years (1986–1991) by Boris Mersson (1921–2013). His affinity for rhythmic music can be traced back to his childhood. He first learnt to play the drums and then the piano. He met Kaspar Rast at a young age, with whom he still makes music today. He was a comic fan and collector from an early age. He was particularly influenced by the classic style of the Belgian Tintin illustrator Hergé, the Ligne Claire. This style of drawing a motif with a few strokes and a certain verve helped him more than studying the great musical role models. At the age of 14, he was fascinated by the energy and music of the film Ran by the legendary Japanese director Akira Kurosawa. Since then, he has been intensively involved with Japanese culture. At the age of 18, his mother introduced him to Zen meditation and gave him the book Zen Mind, Beginner's Mind by Zen master Shunryu Suzuki. The book was an important inspiration for him. The idea of an open, curious and humble "beginner's mind" has shaped his life.

Before studying at the University (Musikhochschule), he was taught by Boris Mersson for five years (1986–1991). He first studied music at the Zurich Musikhochschule (now Zurich University of the Arts) and graduated in 1997 with a classical piano diploma. Additionally, he studied linguistics, musicology, and philosophy at the University of Zurich from 1998 to 2001. He grew interested in the work of avant-garde composers John Cage, Steve Reich, and Morton Feldman. He formed his band Mobile in 1997, and his band Ronin in 2001. Manfred Eicher signed the band Ronin to his label, ECM Records, and released the album Stoa in 2006. During the next year, Bärtsch became co-owner of a club in Zurich. Bärtsch's music has been called zen funk, but with the album Llyria, he moved toward contemporary classical music. He was instructor of Practical Aesthetics at the Musikhochschule Zurich-Winterthur from 2000 to 2003.

Bärtsch lives with his wife, a biologist with a doctorate, shiatsu therapist as well as aikido teacher, and his three daughters in Zurich, where he plays every Monday in "Exil."

== Influences and style ==
Repetition and change are central motifs in Nik Bärtsch's music and performance practice.

Nik Bärtsch's work is at the intersection of contemporary music, jazz and funk influences. The use of repetition, as well as structures based on interweaving elements in his music suggests the influence of minimalist music, and in particular of Steve Reich. Bärtsch is also influenced by oriental philosophy and the ostinato of James Brown. He has also taken a close interest in the work of the American composers John Cage and Morton Feldman.

Bärtsch is fascinated by the Japanese Zen culture. His musical attitude is also influenced by his interest in the Japanese martial art (Aikido) and Zen, among other things. It is his Zen practice of awareness that does not get lost in the multiple, but reduces the multiple as much as possible and concentrates on the essential.

Elements from a wide variety of genres have been put into Bärtsch's music. Funk, jazz, new classical music and Japanese ritual music are all types of music that Bärtsch has sampled from. His music is composed of phrases and motifs that are combined and overlaid in varied ways.

== Accolades ==
At the European jazz competition of the German Leverkusen Jazztage in 1995, Bärtsch reached the finals with Menico Ferrari's band Groove Cooperative. In 1999 and 2002 he was awarded the UBS Culture Foundation Promotion Prize. In 2002 he was awarded the Werkjahr of the Swiss city of Zurich. In 2004 he received the culture prize of the municipality of Zollikon (recognition prize). In 2007 he received a composition commission from Pro Helvetia for a music and dance program with Hideto Heshiki. Bärtsch was simultaneously supported by Pro Helvetia as part of the Priority Jazz Promotion 2007–2009. In 2015 he was nominated for the Swiss Music Prize of the Federal Office of Culture. In 2016 he won the category "Rising Stars Keyboards" of DownBeat magazine. In 2019 he received the Art Prize of the City of Zurich. In 2021 he won an award from DownBeat magazine for the second time, this time in the "Critics Poll" in the category "Rising star piano" piano". These awards are among the most important prizes in the jazz world.

== Discography ==
Year recorded	Title	Label	Notes
2001	Ritual Groove Music	Ronin Rhythm Records	Nik Bärtsch's Mobile with Don Li, Mats Eser and Kaspar Rast
2002	Randori	Ronin Rhythm Records	Nik Bärtsch's Ronin with Björn Meyer, Kaspar Rast and Andy Pupato
2002	Hishiryo: Piano Solo	Ronin Rhythm Records	Solo piano and percussion
2003	Live	Ronin Rhythm Records	Nik Bärtsch's Ronin with Meyer, Kaspar Rast and Pupato
2004	Rea	Ronin Rhythm Records	Nik Bärtsch's Ronin with Meyer, Kaspar Rast, Pupato and guests Sha, Thomy Geiger and Michael Gassmann
2004	Aer	Ronin Rhythm Records	Nik Bärtsch's Mobile with Sha, Kaspar Rast and Mats Eser
2006	Stoa	ECM	Nik Bärtsch's Ronin with Sha, Meyer, Kaspar Rast and Pupato
2008	Holon	ECM	Nik Bärtsch's Ronin with Sha, Meyer, Kaspar Rast and Pupato
2010	Llyria	ECM	Nik Bärtsch's Ronin with Sha, Meyer, Kaspar Rast and Pupato
2012	Nik Bärtsch's Ronin Live	ECM	Nik Bärtsch's Ronin with Sha, Meyer, Kaspar Rast, Pupato and Thomy Jordi
2016	Continuum	ECM	Nik Bärtsch's Mobile with Sha, Kaspar Rast, Nicolas Stocker, string quintet with Etienne Abelin and Ola Sendecka (violin), David Schnee (viola), Ambrosius Huber and Solme Hong (Celli)
2018	Awase	ECM	Nik Bärtsch's Ronin with Sha, Jordi and Kaspar Rast
2021	Entendre	ECM	Nik Bärtsch solo, released in March 2021
2024	Spin	Ronin Rhythm Records	Nik Bärtsch's Ronin with Sha, Jeremias Keller and Kaspar Rast

=== As sideman ===
With Menico Ferrari

- About Roses and Thorns (Unit, 1995)

With Don Li

- Gen (Tonus Music, 2004)

=== As producer ===
- We Need to Repeat, Ingrid Lukas (Ronin Rhythm, 2009)
- RACE, Dee Day Dub (Ronin Rhythm, 2014)
- Demimonde, Ingrid Lukas (Ronin Rhythm Records 2015)
- Echo, Ikarus (Ronin Rhythm Records 2015)

== Books ==
- Nik Bärtsch: Listening - Music, Movement, Mind. Lars Müller publishers, Zürich 2021, ISBN 978-3-03778-670-3
