= Vrengen, Agder =

Village in Arendal Municipality, Norway

Vrengen
- Village
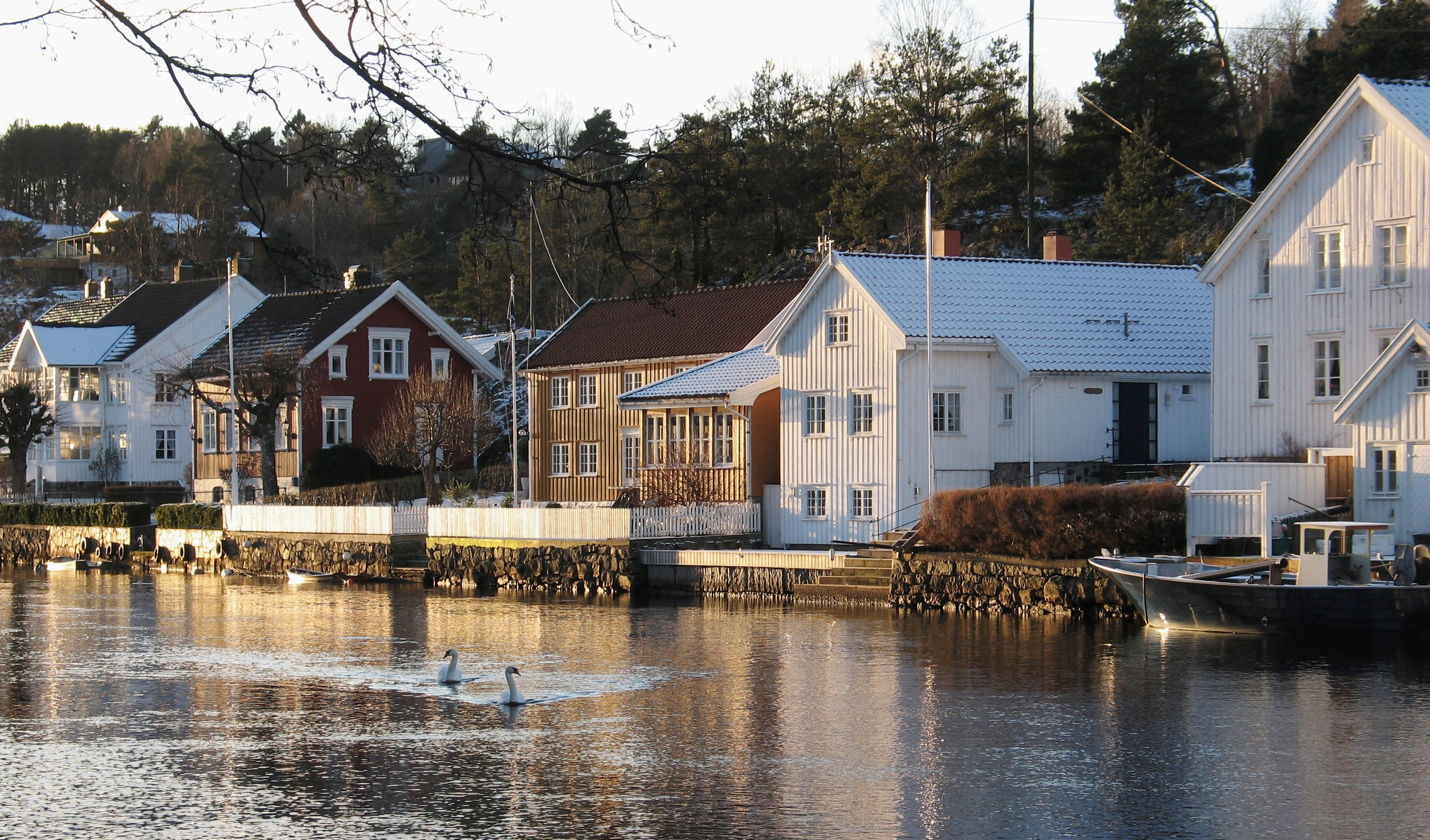
- View of the village
- Interactive map of Vrengen
- Coordinates: 58.4376°N 08.7109°E
- Country: Norway
- Region: Southern Norway
- County: Agder
- District: Østre Agder
- Municipality: Arendal Municipality
- Elevation: 18 m (59 ft)
- Time zone: UTC+01:00 (CET)
  - Summer (DST): UTC+02:00 (CEST)
- Post Code: 4824 Bjorbekk

Vrengen is a village in Arendal Municipality in Agder county, Norway. The village is located in the Bjorbekk area of the municipality, along the Norwegian County Road 407, just north of the mouth of the river Nidelva. The Bjorbekk Church lies just northwest of Vrengen and the village of Asdal lies just to the south.
