= Nedenes =

Village in Arendal Municipality, Norway

- Village
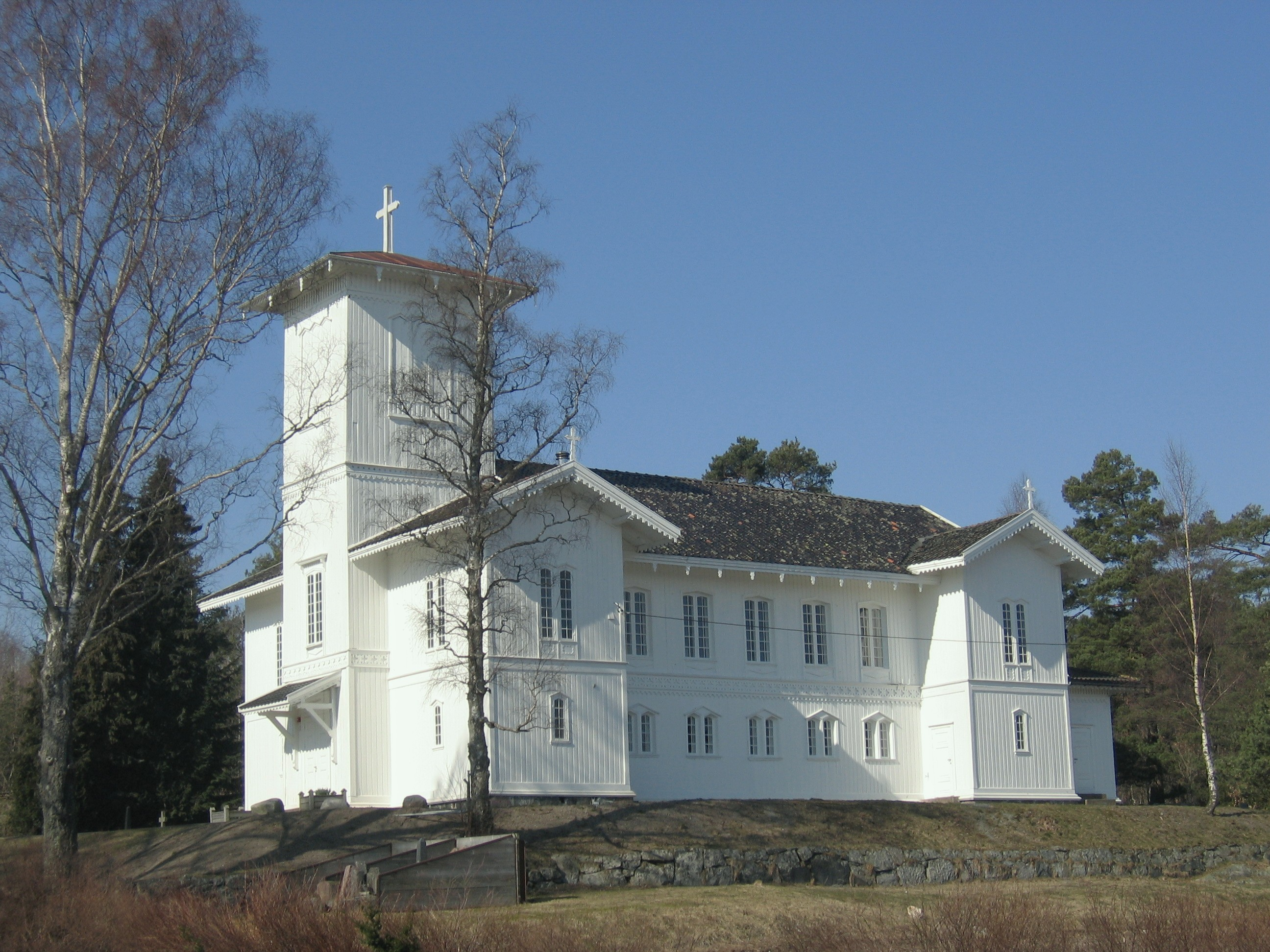
- View of the village church
- Interactive map of Nedenes
- Coordinates: 58.4103°N 08.6976°E
- Country: Norway
- Region: Southern Norway
- County: Agder
- District: Østre Agder
- Municipality: Arendal Municipality
- Elevation: 7 m (23 ft)
- Time zone: UTC+01:00 (CET)
  - Summer (DST): UTC+02:00 (CEST)
- Post Code: 4823 Nedenes

Nedenes is a village in Arendal Municipality in Agder county, Norway. The village is located in the southern part of the municipality, just north of the border with Grimstad Municipality. The Norwegian County Road 420 runs through the village heading north to the village of Rød and onwards to the island of Hisøya to the north. Engene Church is located in Nedenes.

== History ==
The old county of Aust-Agder was named Nedenes amt from the 1600s until 1919. This name was chosen because the village of Nedenes was once a large, medieval farm and later was the seat of the county officials.
