= Llyrìa =

Studio album by Nik Bärtsch's Ronin
- Released: 2010
- Recorded: March 2010
- Studios: Studios la Buissonne; Pernes-les-Fontaines
- Genre: Jazz
- Length: 56:08
- Labels: ECM; ECM 2178
- Producer: Manfred Eicher

Nik Bärtsch chronology
Holon (2007)	Llyrìa (2010)	Nik Bärtsch's Ronin Live (2012)

Llyrìa is an album by Swiss pianist and composer Nik Bärtsch's band Ronin recorded in France in 2010 and released on the ECM label.

== Reception ==
Professional ratings
Review scores
Source	Rating
AllMusic	4/5 stars
The Guardian	4/5 stars

The AllMusic review by Thom Jurek states "Ultimately, Llyria may be slightly more organic and emotional than previous Ronin discs, but it's very much of a piece with Bärtsch's overall musical vision, and longtime listeners will enjoy it as much as new ones."

The Guardian's John Fordham noted "It's minimalism, but Bärtsch has always stretched the method beyond the minutiae of rhythmic and motivic changes to a more robust approach, informed by funk and soul."

== Track listing ==
All tracks are written by Nik Bärtsch.

No.	Title	Length
1.	"Modul 48"	7:00
2.	"Modul 52"	8:18
3.	"Modul 55"	8:40
4.	"Modul 47"	8:02
5.	"Modul 53"	6:55
6.	"Modul 51"	9:53
7.	"Modul 49_44"	7:22

== Personnel ==
- Nik Bärtsch – piano, electric piano
- Sha – bass clarinet, alto saxophone
- Björn Meyer – bass
- Kaspar Rast – drums
- Andi Pupato – percussion
