= Asdal (village) =

Village in Arendal Municipality, Norway

- Village
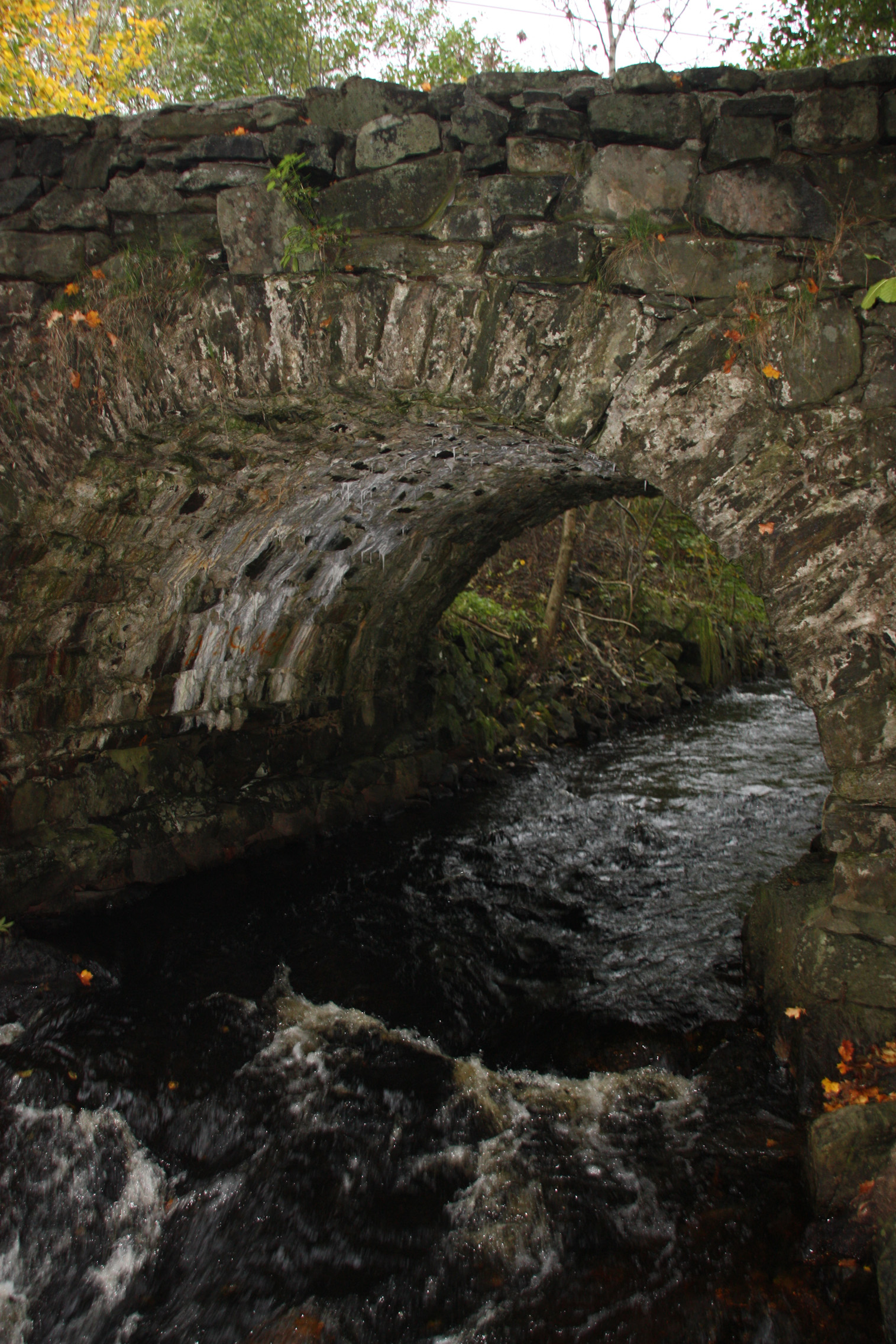
- View of the village
- Interactive map of Asdal
- Coordinates: 58.43399°N 8.70023°E
- Country: Norway
- Region: Southern Norway
- County: Agder
- District: Østre Agder
- Municipality: Arendal Municipality
- Elevation: 20 m (66 ft)
- Time zone: UTC+01:00 (CET)
  - Summer (DST): UTC+02:00 (CEST)
- Post Code: 4824 Bjorbekk

Asdal is a village in Arendal Municipality in Agder county, Norway. The village is located along Norwegian County Road 407 between the European route E18 highway and the river Nidelva. The village sits between the village of Fevik to the south (in Grimstad Municipality) and the town of Arendal to the northeast. The village of Vrengen lies immediately north of Asdal and the village of Rød lies across the river to the southeast.
