= Bjorbekk =

Village in Arendal Municipality, Norway

- Village
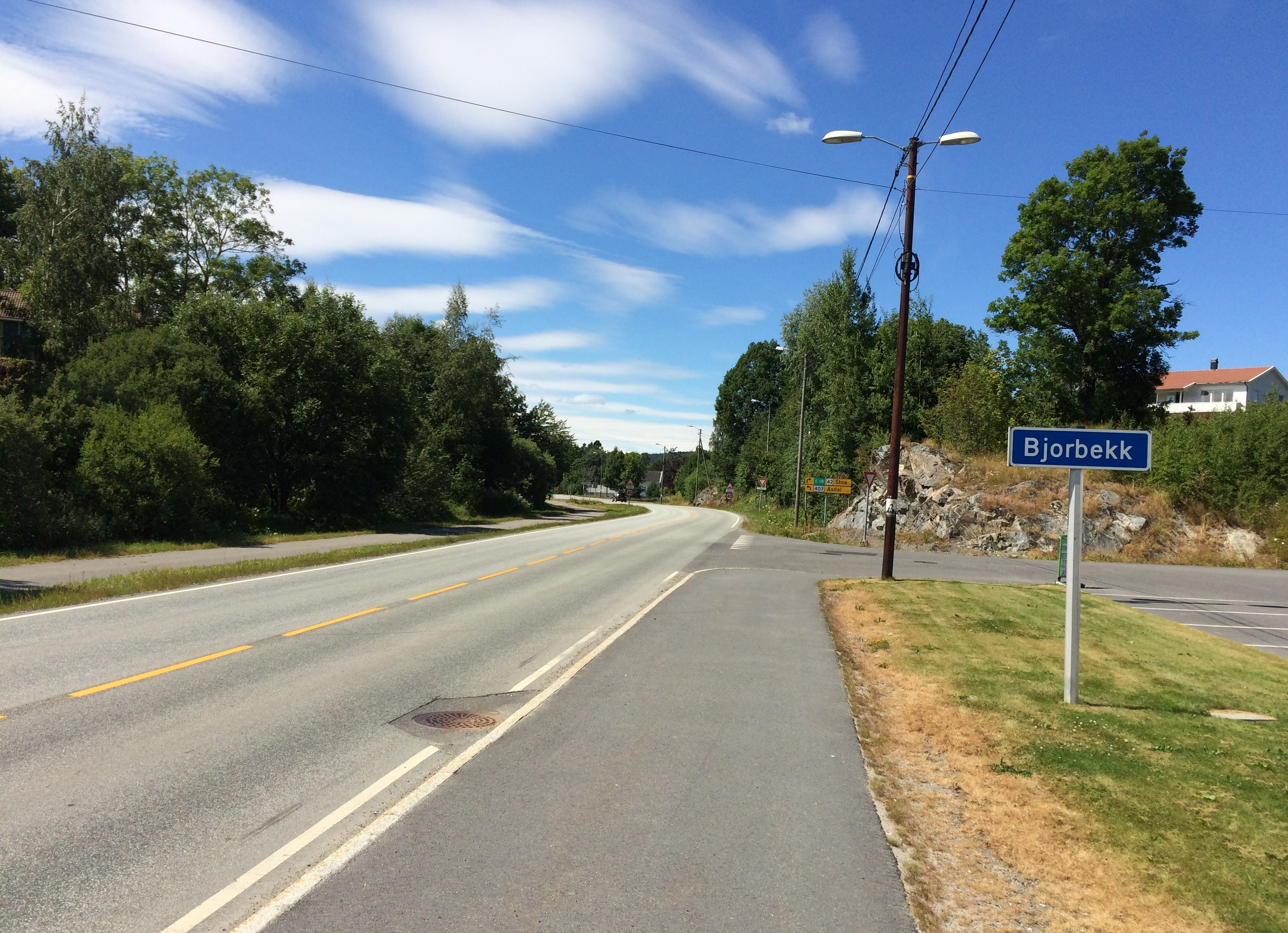
- View of the village
- Interactive map of Bjorbekk
- Coordinates: 58.43504°N 8.69546°E
- Country: Norway
- Region: Southern Norway
- County: Agder
- District: Østre Agder
- Municipality: Arendal Municipality
- Elevation: 20 m (66 ft)
- Time zone: UTC+01:00 (CET)
  - Summer (DST): UTC+02:00 (CEST)
- Post Code: 4824 Bjorbekk

Bjorbekk is a village in Arendal Municipality in Agder county, Norway. The village is located between the Norwegian County Road 407 and the European route E18 highway. The village of Vrengen lies just east of Bjorbekk and the village of Asdal lies just to the south. Bjorbekk Church is located in the village.
