= Bjorbekk Church =

Church in Agder, Norway

- Bjorbekk kirke
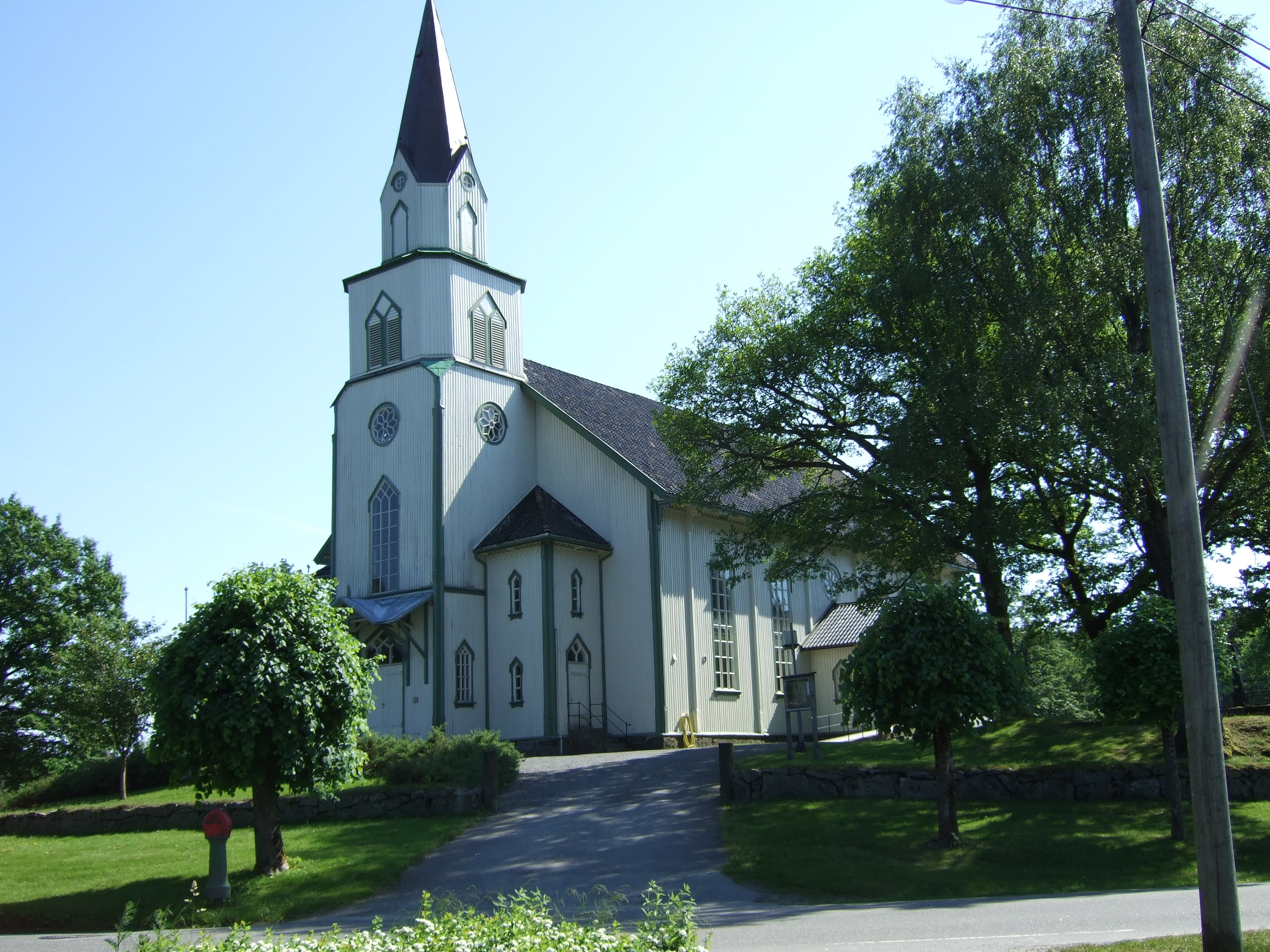
- View of the church
- Bjorbekk Church
- 58.441599°N 08.698116°E
- Location: Arendal Municipality, Agder
- Country: Norway
- Denomination: Church of Norway
- Churchmanship: Evangelical Lutheran

History
- Former name: Øyestad kirke
- Status: Parish church
- Founded: 1884
- Consecrated: 23 July 1884

Architecture
- Functional status: Active
- Architect: J.C. Reuter
- Architectural type: Long church
- Completed: 1884 (142 years ago)

Specifications
- Capacity: 650
- Materials: Wood

Administration
- Diocese: Agder og Telemark
- Deanery: Arendal prosti
- Parish: Øyestad
- Norwegian Cultural Heritage Site
- Type: Church
- Status: Not protected
- ID: 83899

Bjorbekk Church (Norwegian: Bjorbekk kirke) is a parish church of the Church of Norway in Arendal Municipality in Agder county, Norway. It is located in the village of Bjorbekk. It is one of the churches for the Øyestad parish which is part of the Arendal prosti (deanery) in the Diocese of Agder og Telemark. The white, wooden church was built in a long church design in 1884 using plans drawn up by the architect Johan Christoff Friedrich Reuter (1829-1909). The church seats about 650 people.

== History ==
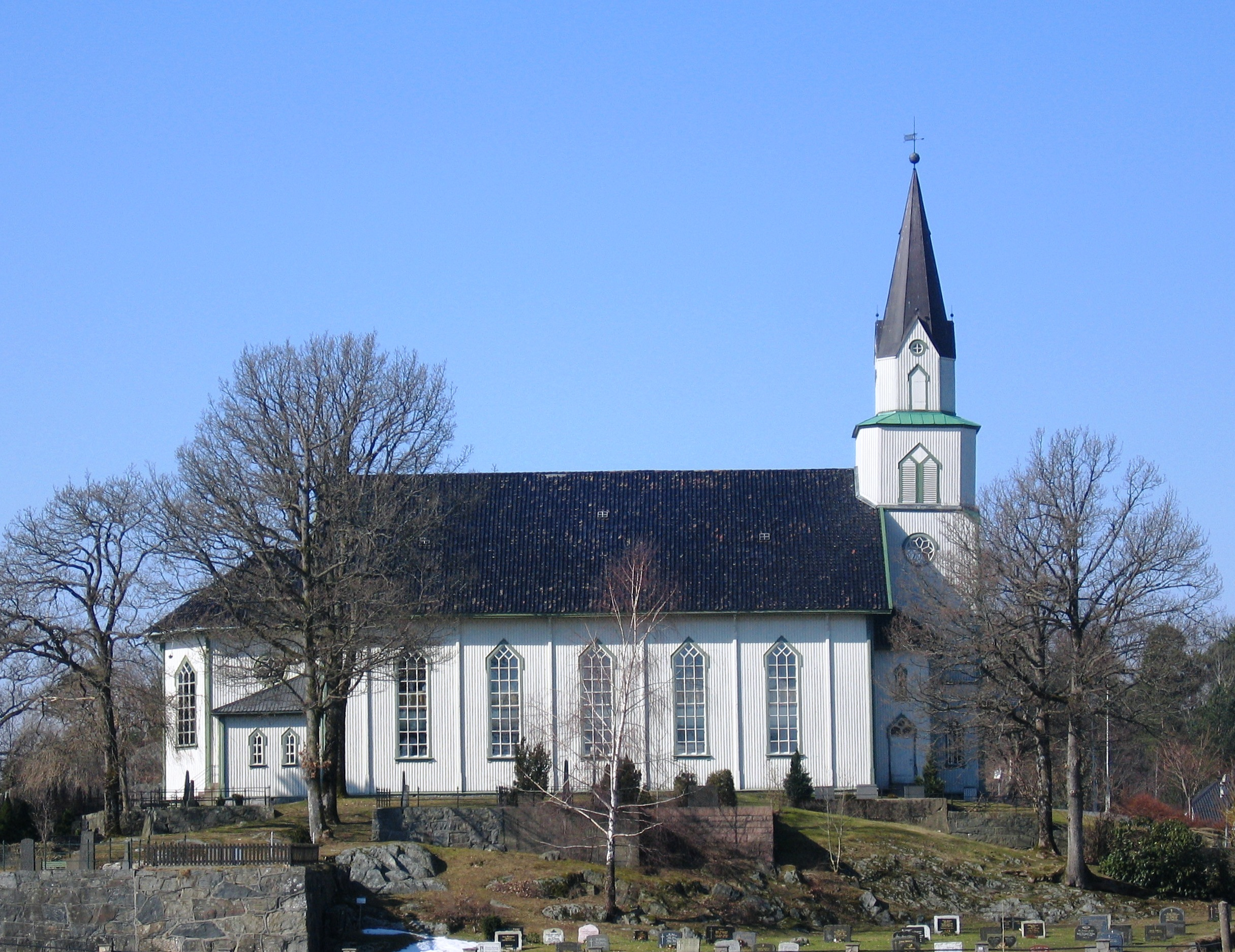
View of the church

In the late 1800s, the centuries-old Øyestad Church had become too small for the parish which was located close to the quickly growing town of Arendal. Construction of the new church was approved in 1882. The design of the building was based on the design of the nearby Stokken Church which was designed by J.C. Reuter. The church cost about 40,000 kr to construct at that time. The new church was consecrated on 23 July 1884.

Originally, this church was named Øyestad Church since it was to be the new main church for that parish and the old Øyestad Church was renamed Old Øyestad Church. Those names, however, did not stick and people began to call this new church Bjorbekk Church since it was on the Bjorbekk farm and they continued to refer to the old church as simply Øyestad Church. The names were later officially changed to match the local usages.

Kristoffer Gunstensen carved the frame of the altarpiece, the pulpit, the baptismal font, and a bell tower. The altarpiece from 1934 was painted by Leonard Rickhard.

== See also ==
- List of churches in Agder og Telemark
