= Don Li (composer/musician) =

Swiss musician

Don Li (born 7 April 1971 in Bern, Switzerland, real name Don Li von Arx) is a Swiss composer, musician (clarinet, saxophone) and music producer of reductive music.

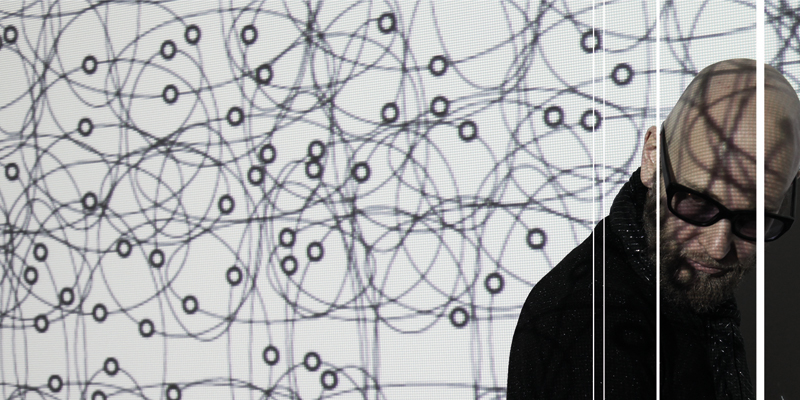
Don Li

== Life and music ==
Born into a family of graphic artists, he played drums, piano and saxophone as a child and started writing his own compositions at the age of 16. As a young saxophonist he played with George Gruntz, Christy Doran, Harald Haerter and Joseph Bowie, among others. He presented most of his compositions with his sextet "Tonus" (1993–2002), which consisted of the musicians Mich Gerber (1997–1998), Nik Bärtsch (1996–2002), Björn Meyer (1998–2002), Werner Hasler (1995–2002), Marco Agovino (1993–2002) and Patrick Lerjen (1993–2002). The album Gen, released in 1999, which forgoes all solo contributions and thus intensifies to become a mesmerizing 27-minute suite, has particularly been acclaimed by reviewers. With respect to rhythm, sound and concept, Gen presents nearly all elements which characterize the essence of Tonus-Music.

In 1999, Don Li founded the music label Tonus-Music-Records and began publishing recordings of various musicians. In 2000, he established the Tonus-Music Laboratory in Bern (Since 2012 renamed as Orbital Garden), which functions as a recording studio and public experimental lab as well as a workshop and teaching location; it also serves as a performance site mostly for interdisciplinary and unorthodox performances – such as a 48-hour non-stop drumbeat performance. He has used the lab to work with, among others, Jojo Mayer, Skúli Sverrisson, Pierre-Yves Borgeaud, Peter Scherer, Ania Losinger, Christian Zehnder, Vidya Shah, Milind Raikar, Sanju Sahai, Kaspar Rast, Asita Hamidi, Björn Meyer, Andi Pupato, Norbert Pfammatter, Nik Bärtsch, Sha, and Zimoun as well as to stage various concerts, exhibitions, lectures and installations. He has also done recordings of the groups of Fabian Kuratli (Fab Four), Asita Hamidi, Bänz Oester, Nik Bärtsch (Mobile) or Christian Zehnder.

His "Tonus-Music" concept combines a composing method that relies on reductive discipline and an almost graphic architecture which incorporates components of Indian classical music, jazz, minimal electronics, or funk. He is interested in metric, interlocking and balancing elements of rhythmic structures in combination with musical asceticism. He has been serially numbering his compositions (parts), which often consist of a single formula, ever since; he compares them with Japanese Haikus and calls them musical sculptures. "It has been seven years now since the saxophonist, clarinettist, composer, band leader and organizer Don Li ... published the twenty-six-minute-long CD, a relatively short prelude to a phenomenon which breaks the mold of purely musical categories." Georg Modestin, der Bund 2006

Since 2005, his works have been dealing with the conscious, chronological structuring of time and, in synchronization with the PC, last exactly 60 minutes (Orbital Garden).

== Awards ==
In 2006, Don Li received a commission from Pro Helvetia, and in 2006 After receiving a New York scholarship from the city of Bern (2002), he was given the option to cooperate in the grant "Werkjahr der Stadt Bern". In 2008 he was awarded the German Record Critics‘ Prize (Preis der deutschen Schallplattenkritik).

== Discography ==
- Don Li Gen (Tonus-Music-Records) 1999
- Don Li Trigon (Tonus-Music-Records) 2000
- Don Li Kun (Tonus-Music-Records) 2001
- Ania Losinger Xala (Tonus-Music-Records) 2001 (Composition)
- Nik Bärtsch Mobile: Ritual Groove Music (Ronin Rhythm 2001)
- Don Li Live Vol. 1 (Tonus-Music-Records) 2002
- Don Li Live Vol. 2 (Tonus-Music-Records) 2002
- Marco Repetto Pure Electronic Works 1 (Tonus-Music-Records) 2003 (Composition)
- Kaspar Rast Part 52 (Tonus-Music-Records) 2003 (Composition)
- Ania Losinger New Ballett for Xala (Tonus-Music-Records) 2004 (Composition)
- Don Li 15 Squared (Tonus-Music-Records) 2005
- Don Li Out of Body Experience (Tonus-Music-Records) 2006
- Don Li A Portrait of Edith Piaf (Tonus-Music-Records) 2008
- Katryn Hasler 11.58 (Tonus-Music-Records) 2009 (Composition)
- Milind Raikar Rains Came Down in Torrents (Tonus-Music-Records) 2010 (Composition)
- Don Li/Peter Scherer That Land (Tonus-Music-Records) 2010
