= Stoa (album) =

Studio album by Nik Bärtsch's Ronin
- Released: 2006
- Recorded: May 2005
- Studios: Studios la Buissonne; Pernes-les-Fontaines
- Genre: Jazz
- Length: 57:13
- Labels: ECM; ECM 1939
- Producer: Manfred Eicher

Nik Bärtsch chronology
| Rea (2004) | Stoa (2006) | Holon (2007) |

Stoa is an album by Swiss pianist and composer Nik Bärtsch's band Ronin recorded in France in May 2005 and released on ECM the following year.

== Reception ==
Professional ratings
Review scores
| Source | Rating |
|---|---|
| Allmusic | 4/5 stars |
| Global Rhythm | 5/5 stars |

The AllMusic review by Thom Jurek states, "ECM has raised the bar once more by recording and releasing a truly compelling, curious, maddening, and provocative Edition of Creative Musicians with Stoa. Ronin is a band of the future, one that has nowhere to go but out into the sonic stratosphere. Judging by this set, it will be exciting to witness where they go from here."

On All About Jazz Budd Kopmann stated "With no melodies and virtually no harmony, but with plenty of constantly internally clashing rhythm, this music's motivic development pushes you one moment and pulls the next. Whether or not you would call it jazz, its kaleidoscopic nature and simple complexity is riveting. Fabulous." On the same site John Kelman noted "Stoa is an important album that stands to expand the way we look at the junctures between repetitive motifs, insistent rhythms and form-based improvisation."

Global Rhythm magazine's podcast producer, host, and contributing writer wrote, "Global grooves, mercurial melodies, plucky polyrhythms and hypnotic happenings abound on this impressive release by Swiss jazz and neo-classical pianist/composer Nik Bärtsch. 'Zen Funk' is how Bärtsch describes his oftentimes Eastern-influenced music, and indeed, the various tracks, simply entitled 'Modul 36' or 'Modul 33,' are metaphysical musical koans of sorts. He is joined by his remarkable band, Ronin: drummer Kaspar Rast, 6-string bassist Björn Meyer, percussionist Andi Pupato, and reedsman, Sha. Imagine an aural geometrical kaleidoscope upon which multiple layers synchronously rotate and morph in a subtle, albeit complex dance. James Brown jamming with Steve Reich, perhaps? Throughout, Meyer and Rast comprise the unerring gyroscopic motor driving Bärtsch's tightly knit compositions, providing Bärtsch and company interspersed space in which to amble. Bärtsch's piano is the axle, as he double-handedly plays contrasting, interlocking patterns in real time, often punctuated by Sha's woodwinds (bass clarinet and tenor saxophone) accents. Repeated listen reveals more depth and complexity with each go around. Very well done!"

== Track listing ==
All music is composed by Nik Bärtsch.

| No. | Title | Length |
|---|---|---|
| 1. | "Modul 36" | 15:17 |
| 2. | "Modul 35" | 9:11 |
| 3. | "Modul 32" | 9:32 |
| 4. | "Modul 33" | 10:42 |
| 5. | "Modul 38_17" | 12:30 |

== Personnel ==
- Nik Bärtsch – piano, electric piano
- Sha – bass clarinet, contrabass clarinet
- Björn Meyer – 6-string bass
- Kaspar Rast – drums
- Andi Pupato – percussion
