= Øyestad Church =

Church in Agder, Norway

- Øyestad kirke
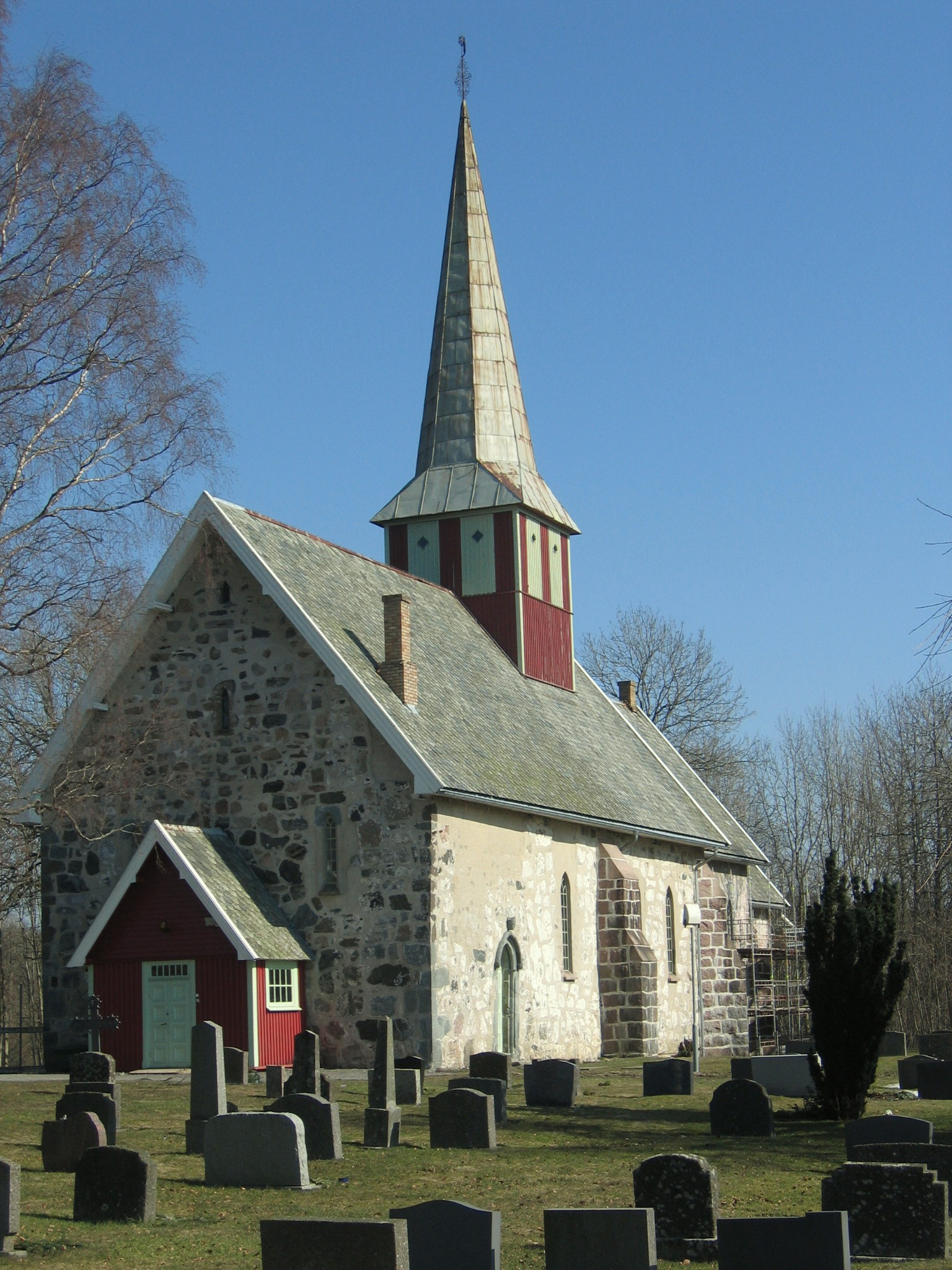
- View of the church
- Øyestad Church
- 58.411697°N 08.64901°E
- Location: Arendal Municipality, Agder
- Country: Norway
- Denomination: Church of Norway
- Previous denomination: Catholic Church
- Churchmanship: Evangelical Lutheran

History
- Status: Parish church
- Founded: c. 1200
- Events: 1900: Fire

Architecture
- Functional status: Active
- Architectural type: Long church
- Completed: c. 1200 (826 years ago)

Specifications
- Capacity: 250
- Materials: Stone

Administration
- Diocese: Agder og Telemark
- Deanery: Arendal prosti
- Parish: Øyestad
- Norwegian Cultural Heritage Site
- Type: Church
- Status: Automatically protected
- ID: 85939

Øyestad Church (Norwegian: Øyestad kirke) is a parish church of the Church of Norway in Arendal Municipality in Agder county, Norway. It is located in the village of Rykene, on the north side of the river Nidelva. It is one of the churches for the Øyestad parish which is part of the Arendal prosti (deanery) in the Diocese of Agder og Telemark. The white, stone church was built in a long church, gothic design around the year 1200 using plans drawn up by an unknown architect. The main body of the church is whitewashed stone, but the main entrance and tower are wooden and painted red. The church seats about 250 people.

== History ==
The earliest existing historical records of the church date back to the year 1338, but the church was likely built around the year 1200 although that date is uncertain. The church was probably built in a Romanesque design originally. In the late 1400s, the church priest was designated as a Canon and around that same time the church was renovated and many Gothic design elements were added. Around this same time the old choir was torn down, the nave was extended, and a new choir was built. The church grew to be a very important church within the diocese, so much so that it used to be referred to as Christianssands lille bispestol (meaning it was the Christianssand Bishop's other seat).

In 1814, this church served as an election church (Norwegian: valgkirke). Together with more than 300 other parish churches across Norway, it was a polling station for elections to the 1814 Norwegian Constituent Assembly which wrote the Constitution of Norway. This was Norway's first national election. Each church parish was a constituency that elected people called "electors" who later met together in each county to elect the representatives for the assembly that was to meet at Eidsvoll Manor later that year.

In the late 1800s, the centuries-old Øyestad Church had become too small for the parish which was located close to the quickly growing town of Arendal. Construction of the new church nearby was approved in 1882. The design of the building was based on the design of the nearby Stokken Church which was designed by J.C. Reuter. The new Bjorbekk Church cost about 40,000 kr to construct at that time. The new church was consecrated on 23 July 1884.

Originally, the new church at Bjorbekk was named Øyestad Church since it was to be the new main church for that parish and the old Øyestad Church was renamed Old Øyestad Church. Those names, however, did not stick and people began to call this new church Bjorbekk Church since it was on the Bjorbekk farm and they continued to refer to the old church as simply Øyestad Church. The names were later officially changed to match the local usages. After the new Bjorbekk Church was completed in 1884, this church was used less often.

Øyestad Church was severely burned by a wildfire on 18 May 1900. The choir, sacristy, tower, altarpiece, and pulpit were all destroyed along with the paintings on the walls. The only parts remaining of the old church were the stone walls and foundation. A few inventory items (such as a baptismal font from 1540, some altar silver and a couple of candlesticks) were rescued, but most were lost in the fire. After the fire, the church was rebuilt using drawings by Jørgen Berner, rebuilding it to look like it did before the fire. The church was completed in 1902. From 2006 to 2008, the church underwent extensive restoration inside and outside the building.

== Media gallery ==
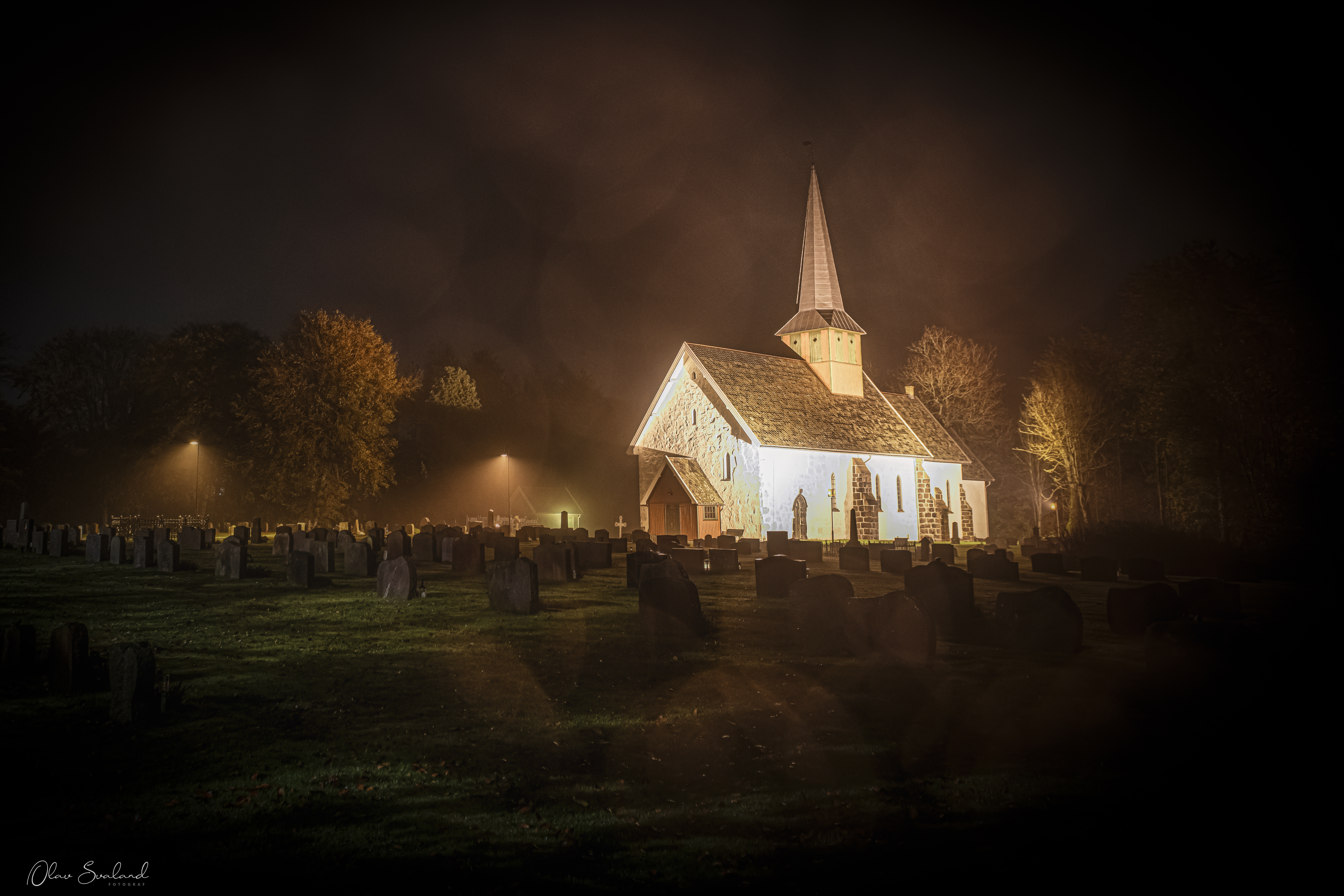

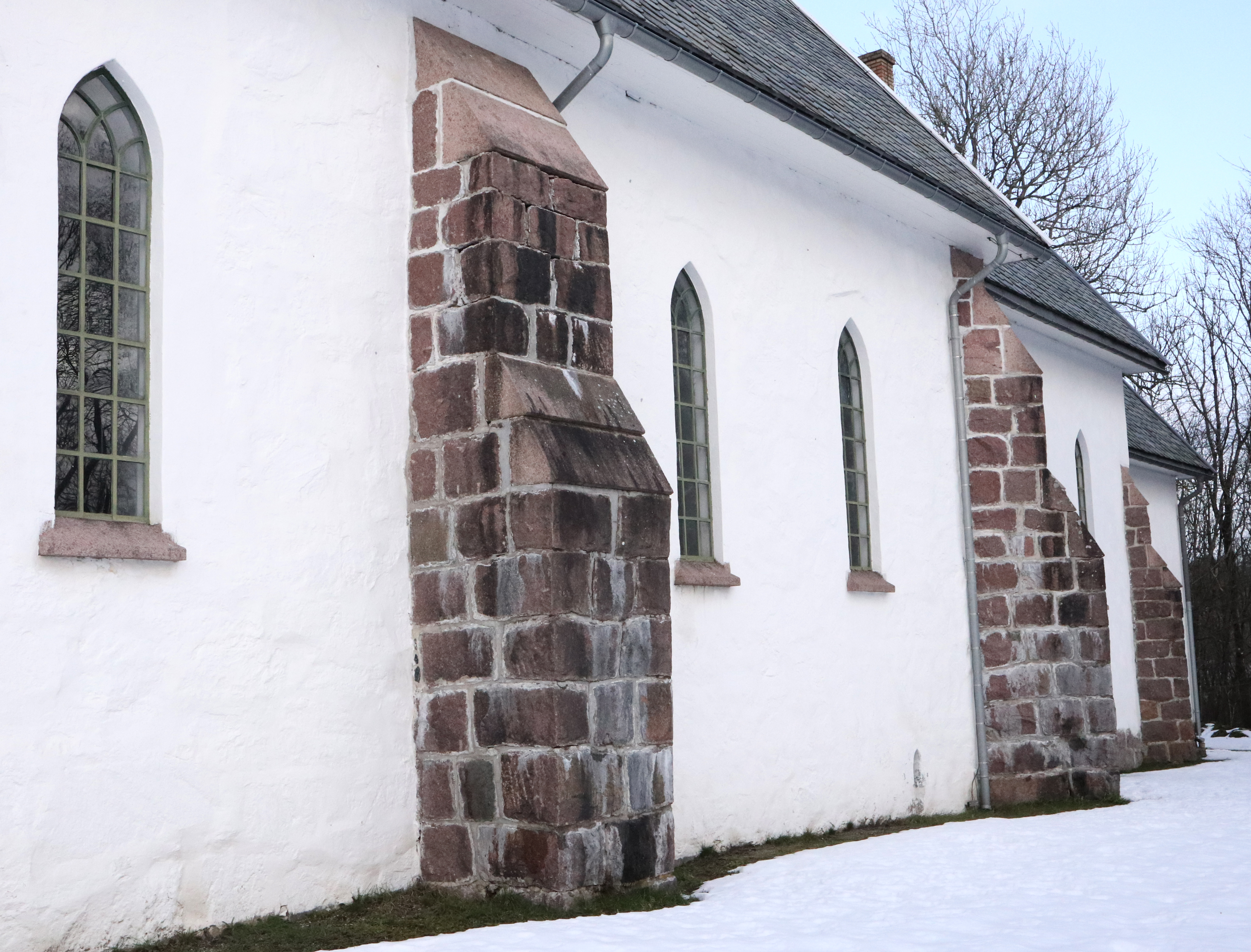

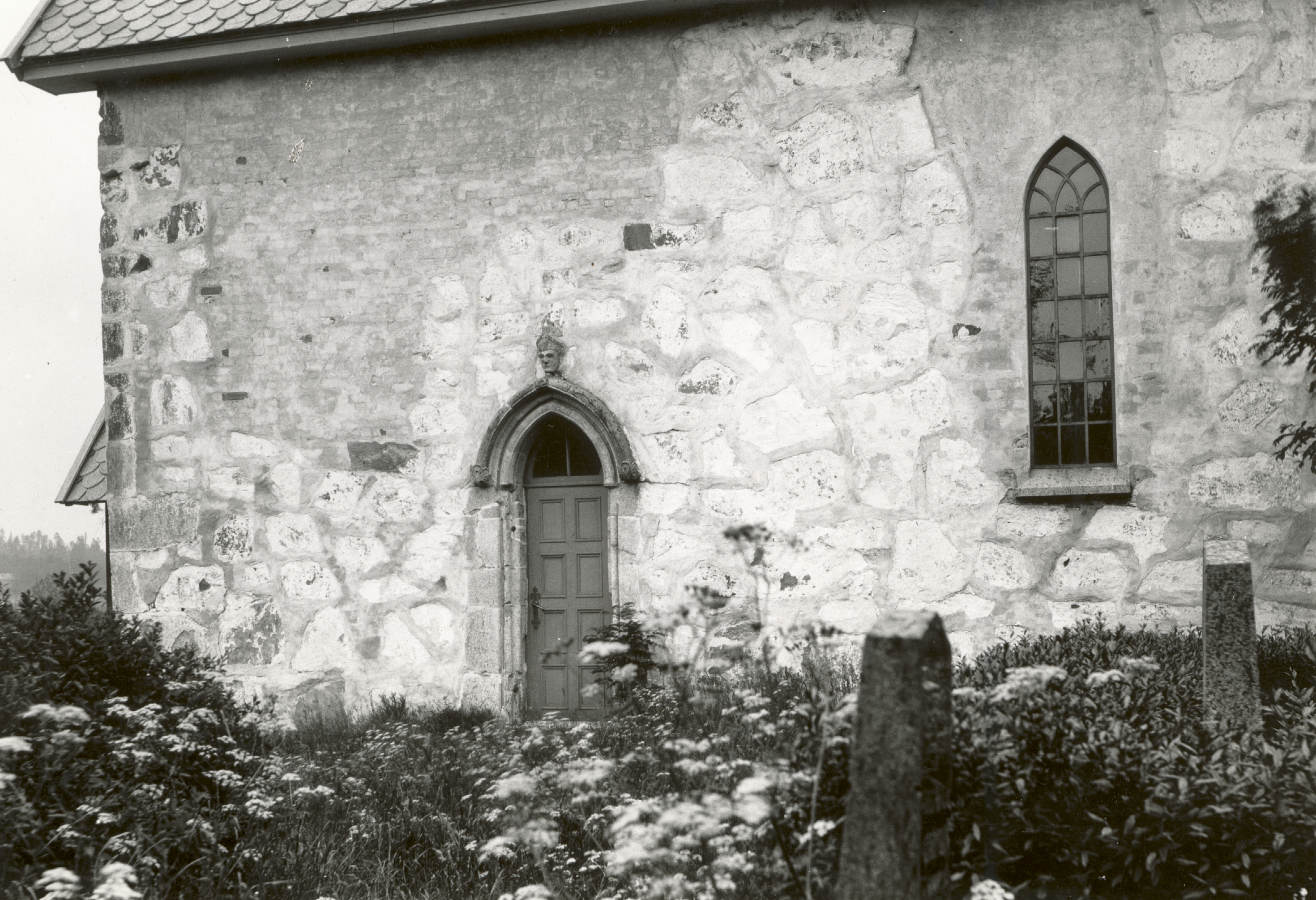

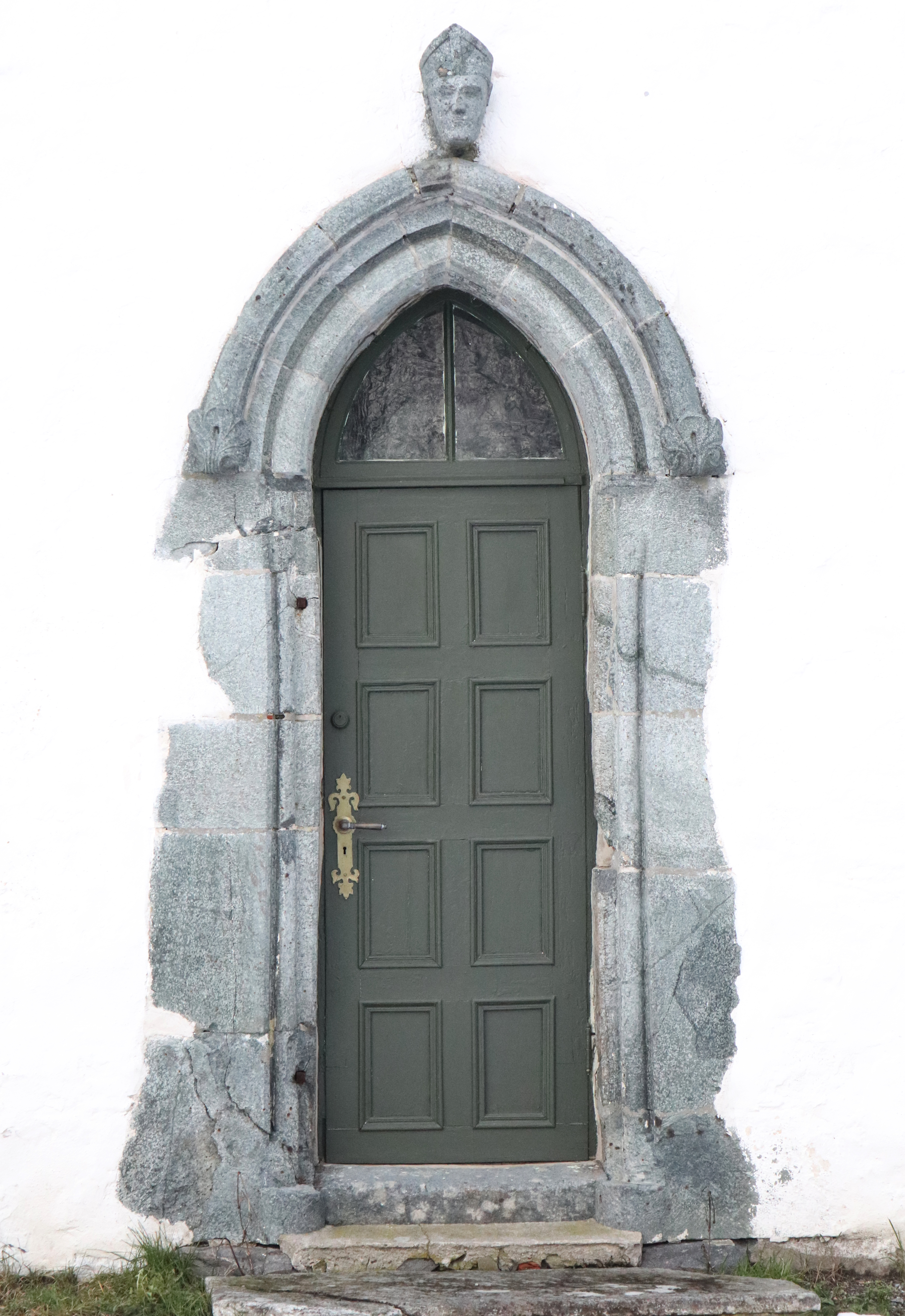

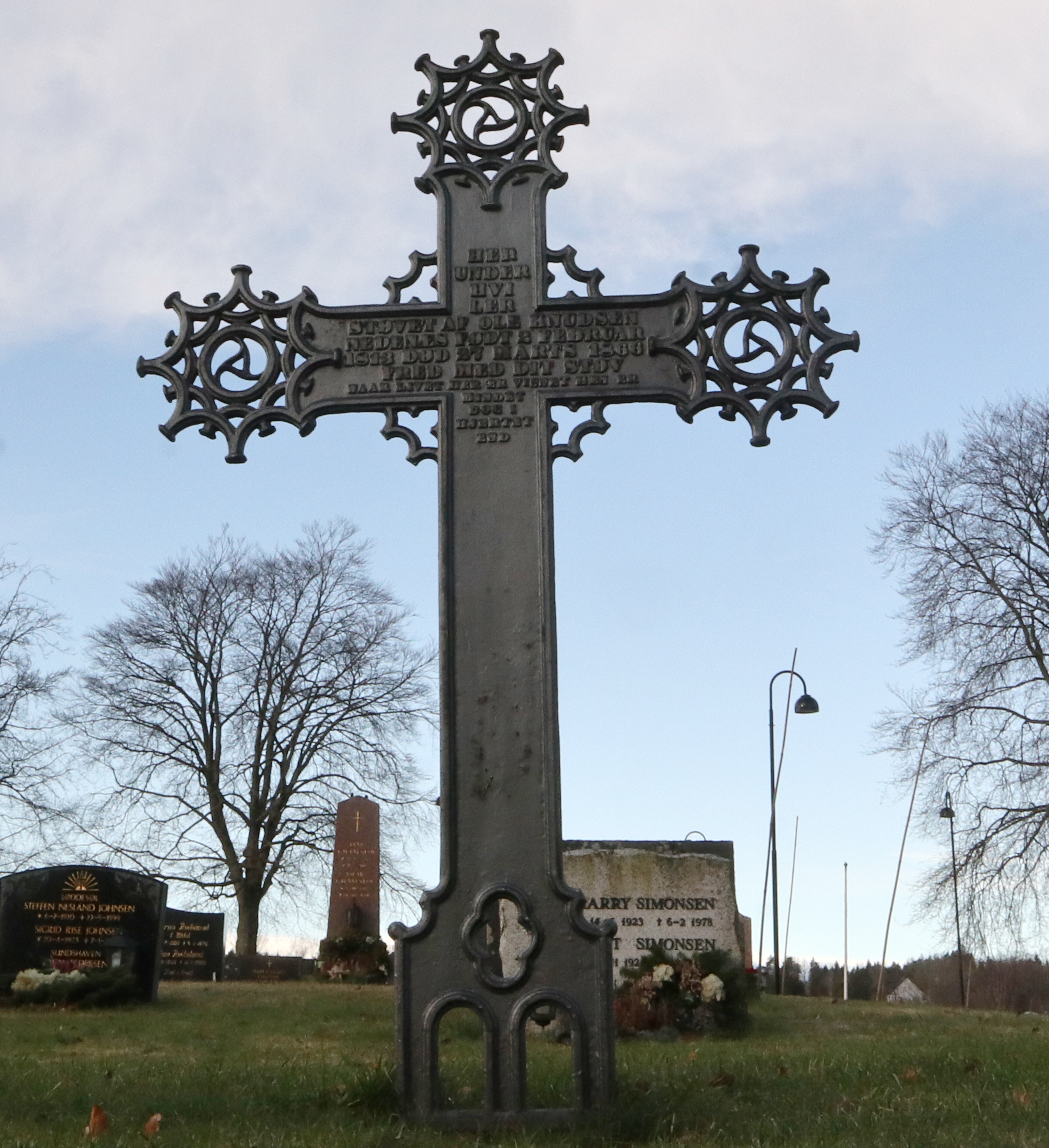

== See also ==
- List of churches in Agder og Telemark
