= List of villages in Agder =

Agder, a county of Norway, contains several villages. Villages which are the administrative centers of their municipality are highlighted in blue and marked with this symbol (†) on this list. The term "villages" includes settlements, hamlets, and farm areas in Agder county. The list excludes cities located in Agder. For other counties see the lists of villages in Norway.

Place	Coordinates	Postal Code	Municipality
Abelnes	58°14′23″N 06°38′56″E	4400	Flekkefjord
Akland	58.7293°N 09.0415°E	4994	Risør
Andabeløy	58°13′55″N 06°40′19″E	4434	Flekkefjord
Asdal	58.4340°N 08.7002°E	4824	Arendal
Askerøya	58.6222°N 09.1024°E	4910	Tvedestrand
Askland	58.8726°N 08.3019°E	4865	Åmli
Aukland	58°12′22″N 07°55′20″E	4618	Kristiansand
Ausland	58.8891°N 09.0439°E	4980	Gjerstad
Austad	58.9621°N 07.6791°E	4745	Bygland
Austad	58°05′24″N 07°02′39″E	4580	Lyngdal
Ausvika	58°04′39″N 07°46′28″E	4640	Kristiansand
Bakken	58.4023°N 07.9170°E	4724	Iveland
Barbu	58.46271°N 8.77414°E	4844	Arendal
Berdalen	59.4476°N 07.4286°E	4754	Bykle
Besteland	59.0363°N 07.5465°E	4748	Valle
Birkeland †	58.3308°N 08.2323°E	4760	Birkenes
Birkeland	58°17′15″N 07°11′33″E	4588	Lyngdal
Birketveit †	58.4624°N 07.9118°E	4724	Iveland
Bjelland	58°23′02″N 07°31′39″E	4536	Lindesnes
Bjerom	58°23′36″N 07°14′31″E	4595	Hægebostad
Bjorbekk	58.4414°N 08.7090°E	4824	Arendal
Bjørnestad	58°39′02″N 06°33′48″E	4440	Sirdal
Bjåen	59.6401°N 07.4404°E	4755	Bykle
Borås	58.5674°N 08.9518°E	4848	Arendal
Bossvika	58.7185°N 09.1046°E	4950	Risør
Brattekleiv	58.4502°N 08.7920°E	4818	Arendal
Breive	59.5738°N 07.2904°E	4755	Bykle
Brekka i Moland	58.5483°N 08.8055°E	4849	Arendal
Brekka i Tromøy	58.4529°N 08.8684°E	4818	Arendal
Brekkestø	58.1952°N 08.3478°E	4780	Lillesand
Breland	58°12′06″N 07°42′22″E	4534	Lindesnes
Breland	58°44′02″N 07°23′41″E	4540	Åseral
Brennåsen	58°08′19″N 07°51′26″E	4647	Kristiansand
Brokke	59.1071°N 07.4890°E	4748	Valle
Bygland †	58.8285°N 07.7962°E	4745	Bygland
Byglandsfjord	58.6661°N 07.8131°E	4741	Bygland
Bykle †	59.3542°N 07.3574°E	4754	Bykle
Byremo	58°25′16″N 07°24′09″E	4529	Lyngdal
Bøylefoss	58.5980°N 08.7173°E	4820	Froland
Bøylestad	58.5780°N 08.7131°E	4820	Froland
Drangsholt	58°15′04″N 08°09′51″E	4658	Kristiansand
Dypvåg	58.6243°N 09.0516°E	4910	Tvedestrand
Dyrestad	57°59′38″N 07°30′10″E	4516	Lindesnes
Dølemo	58.7123°N 08.3437°E	4869	Åmli
Dåsnesmoen	58.5703°N 07.7710°E	4737	Evje og Hornnes
Eid	58°02′37″N 07°39′18″E	4516	Kristiansand
Eide	58.2702°N 08.4801°E	4887	Grimstad
Eik	58°04′48″N 07°47′13″E	4640	Kristiansand
Eikeland	58°02′56″N 07°17′09″E	4520	Lindesnes
Eiken	58°28′43″N 07°12′30″E	4596	Hægebostad
Eikerapen	58°32′23″N 07°21′35″E	4540	Åseral
Engesland	58.5317°N 08.1178°E	4768	Birkenes
Eppeland	58.7218°N 08.3600°E	4869	Åmli
Ersdal	58°26′19″N 06°41′20″E	4400	Flekkefjord
Espelid	58°45′15″N 07°33′00″E	4540	Åseral
Espenes	58.3876°N 08.7067°E	4870	Grimstad
Espetveit	58°30′48″N 06°45′40″E	4440	Sirdal
Espetveit	58°39′55″N 06°38′55″E	4440	Sirdal
Evje †	58.5857°N 07.8036°E	4735	Evje og Hornnes
Evjemoen	58.5637°N 07.7837°E	4738	Evje og Hornnes
Eydehavn	58.4998°N 08.8644°E	4810	Arendal
Farbrot	58°06′34″N 06°55′55″E	4550	Farsund
Farestad	57°59′18″N 07°31′52″E	4516	Lindesnes
Feda	58°15′58″N 06°49′08″E	4485	Kvinesdal
Fevik	58.3782°N 08.6760°E	4870	Grimstad
Fiane	58.8050°N 09.0779°E	4993	Gjerstad
Fiane	58.6184°N 08.8789°E	4934	Tvedestrand
Fidjeland	58°57′26″N 06°55′45″E	4443	Sirdal
Fie	58.6844°N 09.2107°E	4950	Risør
Finsland	58°19′06″N 07°35′33″E	4646	Kristiansand
Fjotland	58°31′35″N 06°59′31″E	4480	Kvinesdal
Flakk	58.3334°N 08.2063°E	4730	Birkenes
Flatebygd	58.6061°N 07.8787°E	4735	Evje og Hornnes
Flaten	58.6364°N 08.6813°E	4868	Åmli
Fleseland	58°05′58″N 07°09′03″E	4580	Lyngdal
Flikka	58°20′54″N 06°39′43″E	4436	Flekkefjord
Flikkeid	58°21′23″N 06°37′48″E	4400	Flekkefjord
Flosta	58.52772°N 8.93235°E	4810	Arendal
Froland	58.5264°N 08.6530°E	4820	Froland
Frolands verk	58.5005°N 08.5793°E	4827	Froland
Færvik	58.4549°N 08.8166°E	4818	Arendal
Gautestad	58.6517°N 07.9533°E	4735	Evje og Hornnes
Gjennestad	58.4246°N 08.6628°E	4821	Arendal
Gjerstad †	58.8809°N 09.0175°E	4980	Gjerstad
Gjeving	58.6479°N 09.1239°E	4912	Tvedestrand
Gjosdal	58°41′23″N 06°45′13″E	4440	Sirdal
Goderstad	58.6003°N 08.8761°E	4912	Tvedestrand
Grindheim	58°26′44″N 07°25′07″E	4529	Lyngdal
Grovane	58°18′04″N 07°59′02″E	4700	Vennesla
Grendi	58.7069°N 07.8250°E	4742	Bygland
Gryting	58.8305°N 09.0552°E	4993	Gjerstad
Grønland	58.6069°N 08.9559°E	4900	Tvedestrand
Gyland	58°25′50″N 06°50′22″E	4436	Flekkefjord
Haddeland	58°30′34″N 07°07′23″E	4596	Hægebostad
Harkmark	58°02′43″N 07°36′16″E	4516	Lindesnes
Haughom	58°35′12″N 06°43′27″E	4440	Sirdal
Haugland	58°23′14″N 07°02′05″E	4480	Kvinesdal
Havik	58°05′52″N 06°49′48″E	4550	Farsund
Heddeland †	58°11′36″N 07°31′27″E	4534	Lindesnes
Heistad	58.9808°N 07.6700°E	4745	Bygland
Heldalsmo	58.6281°N 08.5236°E	4820	Froland
Helldal	58.2698°N 08.4120°E	4790	Lillesand
Helle	58°17′35″N 07°21′27″E	4525	Lyngdal
Helvik	58°06′31″N 06°43′42″E	4560	Farsund
Herefoss	58.5243°N 08.3511°E	4766	Birkenes
Hesnes	58.3446°N 08.6386°E	4885	Grimstad
Hidrasund	58°14′21″N 06°33′39″E	4432	Flekkefjord
Hillestad (Tovdal)	58.8076°N 08.1762°E	4869	Åmli
Hinebu	58.5715°N 08.4805°E	4820	Froland
His (Hisøy)	58.4314°N 08.7434°E	4817	Arendal
Holmsund	58.5578°N 08.9952°E	4920	Arendal
Homborsund	58.2682°N 08.5109°E	4888	Grimstad
Homdrom	58.8338°N 08.3973°E	4865	Åmli
Homme	59.2353°N 07.5476°E	4747	Valle
Homstean	58°15′45″N 07°49′51″E	4715	Vennesla
Hornnes	58.5531°N 07.7717°E	4737	Evje og Hornnes
Hortemo	58°10′21″N 07°49′39″E	4645	Kristiansand
Hoslemo	59.4326°N 07.3946°E	4754	Bykle
Hovden	59.5603°N 07.3567°E	4755	Bykle
Hovet	59.1081°N 07.5190°E	4748	Valle
Hynnekleiv	58.6020°N 08.4181°E	4830	Froland
Hægeland	58°11′12″N 07°21′33″E	4720	Vennesla
Hæåk	58°10′42″N 06°59′23″E	4580	Lyngdal
Hødnebø	58.7728°N 09.2692°E	4990	Risør
Høllen	58°02′43″N 07°08′38″E	4521	Lindesnes
Høllen	58°04′43″N 07°48′30″E	4640	Kristiansand
Høvåg	58.1712°N 08.2459°E	4770	Lillesand
Høyland	58°16′04″N 07°23′11″E	4525	Lyngdal
Håbbesland	58.3429°N 08.2745°E	4730	Birkenes
Håbbestad	58.3914°N 08.6398°E	4885	Grimstad
Hånes	58°10′37″N 08°05′25″E	4635	Kristiansand
Ime	58°02′04″N 07°29′56″E	4516	Lindesnes
Jomås	58.5997°N 08.6260°E	4820	Froland
Jortveit	58.2689°N 08.5084°E	4870	Grimstad
Justvik (Gjusvik)	58°11′48″N 08°01′51″E	4634	Kristiansand
Jødestøl	58°37′26″N 06°45′35″E	4440	Sirdal
Jølle	58°08′23″N 06°36′38″E	4560	Farsund
Kalvøysund	58.5407°N 08.9768°E	4920	Arendal
Kile	58°24′29″N 07°45′51″E	4720	Vennesla
Kilen	58°16′12″N 07°39′36″E	4646	Kristiansand
Kilen	58.5859°N 09.0397°E	4915	Tvedestrand
Kilsund	58.5532°N 08.9769°E	4920	Arendal
Kirkehamn	58°13′55″N 06°32′18″E	4432	Flekkefjord
Kjetså	58.5421°N 07.7594°E	4737	Evje og Hornnes
Klåholmen	58.5977°N 09.0741°E	4915	Tvedestrand
Knaben	58°39′55″N 07°03′59″E	4473	Kvinesdal
Koland	58°13′59″N 07°30′27″E	4536	Lindesnes
Kolbjørnsvik	58.4518°N 08.7695°E	4816	Arendal
Kongshamn	58.4862°N 08.8634°E	4812	Arendal
Konsmo	58°17′07″N 07°21′21″E	4525	Lyngdal
Korshamn	58°01′22″N 07°00′03″E	4586	Lyngdal
Krabbesund	58.6770°N 09.2076°E	4950	Risør
Kroken	58.4067°N 08.5930°E	4885	Grimstad
Krossen	58°16′01″N 08°04′45″E	4519	Lindesnes
Kråkebumoen	58°14′36″N 08°08′05″E	4658	Kristiansand
Kråkvåg	58.6228°N 09.0311°E	4912	Tvedestrand
Kviljo	58°04′30″N 06°41′08″E	4550	Farsund
Kvineshei	58°20′34″N 07°02′56″E	4480	Kvinesdal
Kvinlog	58°31′23″N 06°56′07″E	4473	Kvinesdal
Kvås	58°15′47″N 07°11′58″E	4588	Lyngdal
Kyrkjebygda †	58°36′54″N 07°24′50″E	4540	Åseral
Kylland	58°32′21″N 07°24′58″E	4544	Åseral
Laget	58.6813°N 09.0710°E	4912	Tvedestrand
Langeid	58.9892°N 07.5380°E	4745	Bygland
Langenes	58°04′24″N 07°52′22″E	4681	Kristiansand
Lastad	58°03′18″N 07°42′06″E	4640	Kristiansand
Laudal	58°14′49″N 07°30′16″E	4534	Lindesnes
Laukvik	58.6940°N 09.1862°E	4950	Risør
Lauvdal	58.7944°N 07.8189°E	4745	Bygland
Lauveik	58.7562°N 08.4864°E	4865	Åmli
Lauvrak	58.6637°N 08.2476°E	4828	Froland
Libru	58.4779°N 08.6762°E	4848	Arendal
Liknes †	58°18′43″N 06°57′42″E	4480	Kvinesdal
Lindtveit	58.4193°N 08.6136°E	4821	Arendal
Litveit	58.9387°N 07.7649°E	4745	Bygland
Ljosland	58°47′17″N 07°21′10″E	4540	Åseral
Lohne	58°05′44″N 07°44′31″E	4640	Kristiansand
Loland	58°17′15″N 07°52′38″E	4715	Vennesla
Longerak	58.7503°N 07.8525°E	4742	Bygland
Longum	58.5088°N 08.7772°E	4849	Arendal
Loshavn	58°03′52″N 06°48′58″E	4550	Farsund
Lunde	58°48′30″N 06°45′51″E	4440	Sirdal
Lunde	58°05′44″N 07°46′56″E	4640	Kristiansand
Lyngør	58.6326°N 09.1297°E	4910	Tvedestrand
Løddesøl	58.4421°N 08.6233°E	4821	Arendal
Løvjomås	58.5560°N 08.6076°E	4820	Froland
Merdø	58.4246°N 08.8002°E	4817	Arendal
Mjølhus	58.5145°N 08.6299°E	4820	Froland
Mjåvatn	58.5387°N 08.4897°E	4828	Froland
Mo	58.8342°N 08.8845°E	4985	Vegårshei
Moen	58.7232°N 09.0733°E	4994	Risør
Moi	58.9630°N 07.6665°E	4745	Bygland
Moi	58.50682°N 7.76888°E	4737	Evje og Hornnes
Moi	58.34221°N 7.03779°E	4480	Kvinesdal
Moi	58.24513°N 7.18434°E	4588	Lyngdal
Molland	58.3208°N 08.5455°E	4887	Grimstad
Mollestad	58.3187°N 08.1876°E	4730	Birkenes
Mosby	58°13′02″N 07°55′23″E	4619	Kristiansand
Mushom	58°16′05″N 07°48′17″E	4715	Vennesla
Mykland	58.6320°N 08.2880°E	4832	Froland
Myra †	58.7492°N 08.8625°E	4985	Vegårshei
Mæbø	58°04′26″N 08°00′10″E	4625	Kristiansand
Narestø	58.5246°N 08.9337°E	4920	Arendal
Nedenes	58.4103°N 08.6976°E	4823	Arendal
Nelaug	58.6565°N 08.6333°E	4863	Åmli
Nesgrenda	58.6308°N 08.8557°E	4934	Tvedestrand
Netland	58°37′32″N 06°54′23″E	4473	Kvinesdal
Nipe	58.6683°N 09.1412°E	4950	Risør
Nodeland	58°09′18″N 07°50′08″E	4645	Kristiansand
Nodelandsheia	58°10′03″N 07°51′00″E	4645	Kristiansand
Nordbygdi	59.3486°N 07.2585°E	4754	Bykle
Ny-Hellesund	58°03′12″N 07°50′25″E	4640	Kristiansand
Nygrenda	58.3449°N 08.3946°E	4886	Grimstad
Nævesdal	58.4428°N 08.5759°E	4821	Arendal
Oftedal	58°32′48″N 06°43′45″E	4440	Sirdal
Oggevatn	58.4448°N 08.1109°E	4768	Birkenes
Ore	58°06′33″N 06°38′26″E	4560	Farsund
Ose	58.9503°N 07.6798°E	4745	Bygland
Osedalen/Blakstad †	58.5078°N 08.6302°E	4820	Froland
Osen	58°39′51″N 06°36′49″E	4440	Sirdal
Pusnes	58.4604°N 08.7886°E	4818	Arendal
Rafoss	58°21′29″N 06°58′37″E	4480	Kvinesdal
Randesund	58°08′03″N 08°07′03″E	4639	Kristiansand
Rasvåg	58°12′46″N 06°34′53″E	4432	Flekkefjord
Reddal	58.3351°N 08.4472°E	4886	Grimstad
Revesand	58.4380°N 08.8002°E	4818	Arendal
Ribe	58.1312°N 08.2104°E	4770	Lillesand
Risdal	58.6687°N 08.1248°E	4834	Froland
Rise	58.4641°N 08.6276°E	4821	Arendal
Risnes	58°39′20″N 06°56′37″E	4473	Kvinesdal
Roresand	58.3515°N 08.5372°E	4885	Grimstad
Rugsland	58.2895°N 08.1762°E	4760	Birkenes
Ryen	58°13′24″N 08°06′35″E	4658	Kristiansand
Rygnestad	59.2612°N 07.4900°E	4747	Valle
Rykene	58.4097°N 08.6384°E	4821	Arendal
Rysstad	59.0935°N 07.5359°E	4748	Valle
Rød	58.4229°N 08.7116°E	4823	Arendal
Rød	58.8932°N 08.9935°E	4980	Gjerstad
Rødland	58°05′31″N 06°54′07″E	4550	Farsund
Rønnes	58.3389°N 08.6036°E	4885	Grimstad
Røyknes	58°20′40″N 07°53′51″E	4715	Vennesla
Røysland	58.7752°N 09.2367°E	4994	Risør
Sagene	58.5365°N 08.8557°E	4810	Arendal
Sagesund	58.6054°N 08.9724°E	4900	Tvedestrand
Saltrød	58.4887°N 08.8400°E	4815	Arendal
Samkom	58°20′07″N 07°52′33″E	4700	Vennesla
Sande	58°09′26″N 06°47′58″E	4550	Farsund
Sandnes	58.8889°N 07.7260°E	4745	Bygland
Sandnes	58.6906°N 09.1596°E	4950	Risør
Sandvika (Borøy)	58.5700°N 09.0012°E	4916	Tvedestrand
Seland	58°20′20″N 06°49′18″E	4485	Flekkefjord
Selskjer	58°03′20″N 07°42′39″E	4640	Kristiansand
Sennumstad	58.4165°N 08.2864°E	4760	Birkenes
Sinnes	58°54′55″N 06°51′56″E	4443	Sirdal
Sira	58°25′13″N 06°39′46″E	4438	Flekkefjord
Sirnes	58°24′35″N 06°38′46″E	4438	Flekkefjord
Sivik	58.7534°N 09.1778°E	4990	Risør
Sjølingstad	58°04′07″N 07°23′17″E	4513	Lindesnes
Skaiå	58.3929°N 07.9139°E	4724	Iveland
Skagestad	58°03′45″N 07°34′29″E	4516	Lindesnes
Skarpengland	58°17′43″N 07°50′25″E	4715	Vennesla
Skeie	58°27′41″N 07°13′53″E	4596	Hægebostad
Skeie	58°02′51″N 07°35′05″E	4516	Lindesnes
Skiftenes	58.3944°N 08.5065°E	4886	Grimstad
Skjeggedal	58.7530°N 08.1256°E	4835	Åmli
Skofteland	58°06′21″N 07°20′41″E	4520	Lindesnes
Skomrak	58°06′57″N 07°03′42″E	4580	Lyngdal
Skålevik	58°04′46″N 08°00′57″E	4625	Kristiansand
Skåmedal	58.8767°N 07.7024°E	4745	Bygland
Snartemo	58°20′00″N 07°12′45″E	4590	Hægebostad
Snig	58°03′12″N 07°16′14″E	4520	Lindesnes
Sodefjed	58°07′01″N 08°08′58″E	4639	Kristiansand
Songe	58.6854°N 09.0044°E	4909	Tvedestrand
Staubø	58.5627°N 08.9827°E	4920	Arendal
Stave	58°07′14″N 06°36′01″E	4560	Farsund
Stoa	58.4641°N 08.7174°E	4848	Arendal
Stokkeland	58°12′14″N 07°47′17″E	4645	Kristiansand
Storekvina	58°22′51″N 06°57′25″E	4480	Kvinesdal
Strai	58°11′21″N 07°55′41″E	4618	Kristiansand
Strengereid	58.5266°N 08.8885°E	4810	Arendal
Sundebru	58.8382°N 09.0872°E	4993	Gjerstad
Svaland	58.3138°N 08.1122°E	4760	Birkenes
Sveindal	58°29′18″N 07°28′00″E	4529	Lyngdal
Svenevig	58°02′55″N 07°12′02″E	4521	Lindesnes
Svenevik	58°06′36″N 07°01′33″E	4580	Lyngdal
Søndeled	58.7609°N 09.0749°E	4990	Risør
Søre Herefoss	58.4604°N 08.3340°E	4766	Birkenes
Tangvall	58°05′52″N 07°48′55″E	4640	Kristiansand
Tingvatn (or Birkeland) †	58°22′31″N 07°13′17″E	4595	Hægebostad
Tjore	58.3182°N 08.5184°E	4887	Grimstad
Tjørhom	58°53′20″N 06°51′03″E	4443	Sirdal
Tonstad †	58°39′51″N 06°42′49″E	4440	Sirdal
Torp	58°04′46″N 06°45′08″E	4550	Farsund
Tregde	58°00′35″N 07°33′28″E	4516	Lindesnes
Trysnes	58°03′23″N 07°42′38″E	4640	Kristiansand
Træland	58°20′53″N 06°58′02″E	4480	Kvinesdal
Trøe	58.2099°N 08.2506°E	4790	Lillesand
Tveide	58.3024°N 08.2295°E	4730	Birkenes
Tveit	58°13′24″N 08°06′35″E	4658	Kristiansand
Tveit	58.7650°N 08.5360°E	4865	Åmli
Ubergsmoen	58.6803°N 08.8221°E	4985	Vegårshei
Ulvøysund	58.1137°N 08.2101°E	4770	Lillesand
Uppstad	59.1370°N 07.5138°E	4748	Valle
Valle †	59.2126°N 07.5356°E	4747	Valle
Valvik	57°59′25″N 07°30′33″E	4516	Lindesnes
Vanse	58°05′53″N 06°41′30″E	4560	Farsund
Vatne	58°28′48″N 07°11′35″E	4596	Hægebostad
Vatnebu	58.5533°N 08.9404°E	4810	Arendal
Vatnestrøm	58.4131°N 08.0627°E	4730	Iveland
Ve	58°12′30″N 08°06′10″E	4658	Kristiansand
Vedderheia	58°06′16″N 07°45′45″E	4640	Kristiansand
Vehus	58.6830°N 08.4050°E	4869	Åmli
Vennesla †	58°16′06″N 07°58′23″E	4700	Vennesla
Vestbygd	58°05′59″N 06°35′13″E	4563	Farsund
Vesterhus	58.1581°N 08.1848°E	4770	Lillesand
Vestre Skogsfjord	58°02′51″N 07°24′43″E	4513	Lindesnes
Vestøl	58.8608°N 08.9218°E	4980	Gjerstad
Vidrak	58°34′42″N 06°41′03″E	4440	Sirdal
Vigeland †	58°05′03″N 07°18′18″E	4520	Lindesnes
Vigmostad	58°11′58″N 07°20′09″E	4520	Lindesnes
Vik	58.3683°N 08.6227°E	4885	Grimstad
Vivlemo	58°15′12″N 07°21′06″E	4525	Lyngdal
Volleberg	58°07′19″N 07°50′57″E	4647	Kristiansand
Vrengen	58.4376°N 08.7109°E	4824	Arendal
Væmestad	58°13′55″N 07°09′54″E	4588	Lyngdal
Væting	58.4590°N 08.2658°E	4766	Birkenes
Vågsbygda	58°06′59″N 07°56′27″E	4624	Kristiansand
Yksnedal	58°35′56″N 06°43′45″E	4440	Sirdal
Ytre Hægeland	58°15′13″N 07°46′02″E	4715	Vennesla
Ytre Ramse	58.7686°N 08.2562°E	4869	Åmli
Østerholt	58.8459°N 09.1074°E	4993	Gjerstad
Østerhus	58.2763°N 08.5149°E	4879	Grimstad
Østerå	58.6281°N 08.9593°E	4900	Tvedestrand
Øvre Dåsvatn	58.6448°N 07.6117°E	4737	Evje og Hornnes
Øvre Eikeland	58°22′17″N 07°45′21″E	4720	Vennesla
Øvre Ramse	58.7930°N 08.2275°E	4869	Åmli
Øvrebø	58°17′29″N 07°46′42″E	4715	Vennesla
Øye	58°17′00″N 06°53′54″E	4484	Kvinesdal
Øyna	58.5086°N 08.9394°E	4812	Arendal
Øyslebø	58°10′02″N 07°33′05″E	4532	Lindesnes
Åkerøyhamn	58.1843°N 08.3157°E	4780	Lillesand
Åknes	58°45′05″N 07°30′51″E	4540	Åseral
Ålefjær	58°14′14″N 08°02′06″E	4634	Kristiansand
Ålo	58°02′55″N 07°41′38″E	4640	Kristiansand
Åmdalsøyra	58.4946°N 08.8811°E	4812	Arendal
Åmland	58°22′20″N 06°58′18″E	4480	Kvinesdal
Åmli	58°50′30″N 06°46′35″E	4440	Sirdal
Åmli †	58.7657°N 08.4839°E	4865	Åmli
Åmot	58°18′58″N 06°57′44″E	4480	Kvinesdal
Åna-Sira	58°17′32″N 06°26′24″E	4420	Flekkefjord
Åneland	58.5804°N 07.8618°E	4735	Evje og Hornnes
Åpta	58°11′19″N 06°47′55″E	4550	Farsund
Åraksbø	58.9211°N 07.7466°E	4745	Bygland
Åros	58°04′44″N 07°49′31″E	4644	Kristiansand
Ås	58.5196°N 08.1310°E	4768	Birkenes
Åshamn	58°04′45″N 07°58′40″E	4625	Kristiansand
Åvik	58°01′57″N 07°13′16″E	4521	Lindesnes

== See also ==
- For other counties, see the lists of villages in Norway
