= Froland =

Froland may refer to:

== Places ==
- Froland Municipality, a municipality in Agder county, Norway
- Froland (village), a village within Froland Municipality in Agder county, Norway
- Froland Church, a church in Froland Municipality in Agder county, Norway
- Froland Station, a railway station in Froland Municipality in Agder county, Norway

== People ==
- Dag Frøland (1945–2010), a Norwegian comedian, revue artist, and singer
- Stig Frøland (born 1940), a Norwegian professor of medicine

== See also ==
- Frolands verk
