= Heldalsmo =

Village in Froland Municipality, Norway

- Village
- Interactive map of Heldalsmo
- Coordinates: 58.6281°N 08.5236°E
- Country: Norway
- Region: Southern Norway
- County: Agder
- District: Østre Agder
- Municipality: Froland Municipality
- Elevation: 218 m (715 ft)
- Time zone: UTC+01:00 (CET)
  - Summer (DST): UTC+02:00 (CEST)
- Post Code: 4820 Froland

Heldalsmo is a village in Froland Municipality in Agder county, Norway. The village is located along the Sørlandsbanen railway line, about 4 kilometres (2.5 mi) southwest of the lake Nelaug. The village is only accessible by rail from Hynnekleiv to the west or Nelaug to the east, or by the Norwegian County Road 152 which runs to the south through Jomås and on to Blakstad.
