= Mykland =

Mykland may refer to:

== People ==
- Erik Mykland (born 1971), a former Norwegian footballer known as "Myggen" ("the Mosquito")
- Thor-Eirik Gulbrandsen Mykland (1940–2014), a Norwegian politician for the Labour Party

== Places ==
- Mykland (village), a village in Froland Municipality in Agder county, Norway
- Mykland Church, a church in Froland Municipality in Agder county, Norway
- Mykland Municipality, a former municipality in the old Aust-Agder county, Norway
