= Risdal =

Village in Froland Municipality, Norway

- Village
- Interactive map of Risdal
- Coordinates: 58.6687°N 08.1248°E
- Country: Norway
- Region: Southern Norway
- County: Agder
- District: Østre Agder
- Municipality: Froland Municipality
- Elevation: 219 m (719 ft)
- Time zone: UTC+01:00 (CET)
  - Summer (DST): UTC+02:00 (CEST)
- Post Code: 4834 Risdal

Risdal is a village in Froland Municipality in Agder county, Norway. The village is located along the Vatnedalsåna river, about 12 kilometres (7.5 mi) northwest of the village of Mykland and a short distance west of the village of Mjåvatn.
