= Løvjomås =

Village in Froland Municipality, Norway

- Village
- Interactive map of Løvjomås
- Coordinates: 58.5560°N 08.6076°E
- Country: Norway
- Region: Southern Norway
- County: Agder
- District: Østre Agder
- Municipality: Froland Municipality
- Elevation: 162 m (531 ft)
- Time zone: UTC+01:00 (CET)
  - Summer (DST): UTC+02:00 (CEST)
- Post Code: 4820 Froland

Løvjomås is a village in Froland Municipality in Agder county, Norway. The village is located about 5 kilometres (3.1 mi) northwest of the village of Froland, where Froland Church is located, and about 7 kilometres (4.3 mi) south of the village of Jomås.
