= Mykland Municipality =

Former municipality in Aust-Agder, Norway

Mykland Municipality Mykland herad
- Former municipality
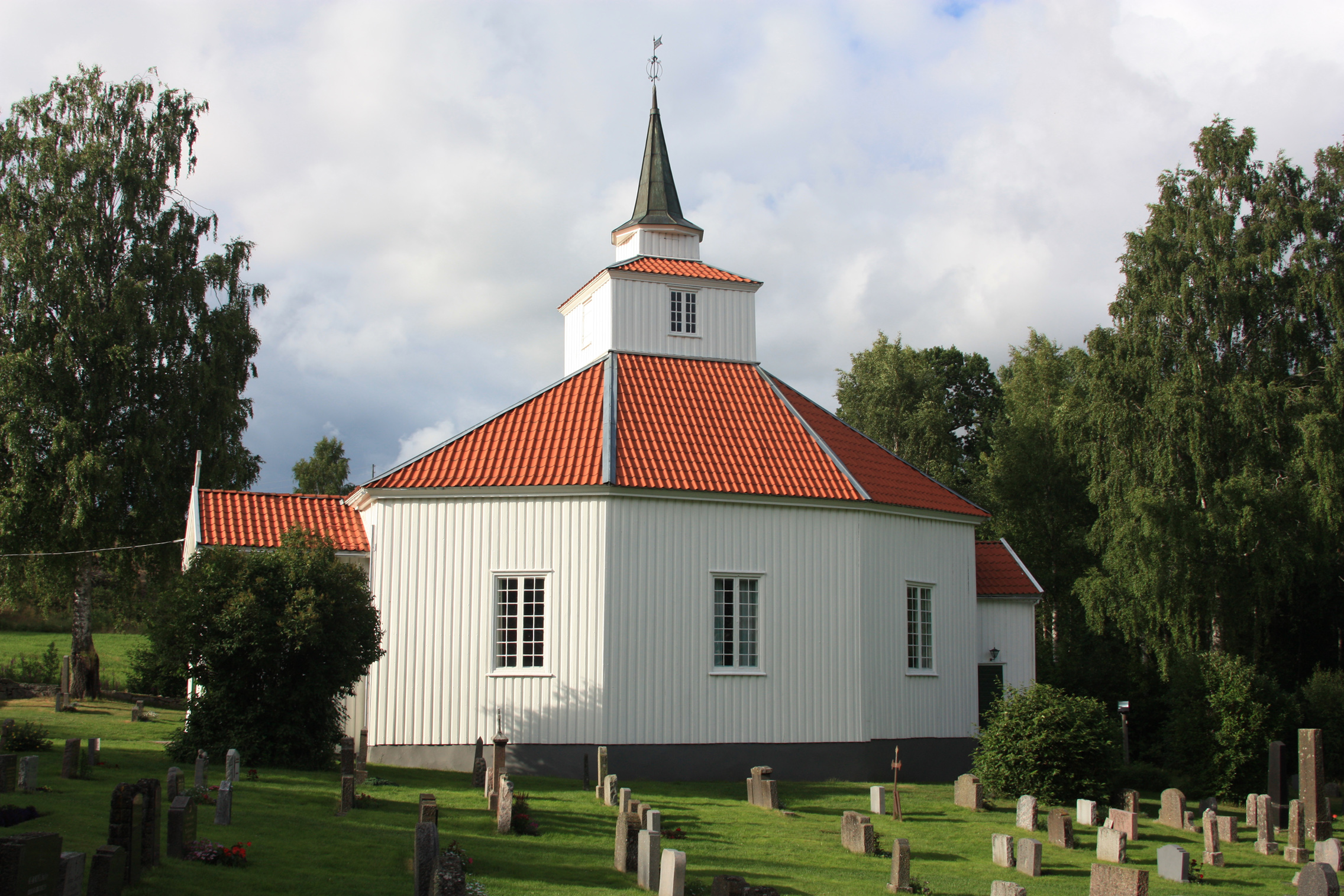
- View of the local Mykland Church

- Aust-Agder within Norway

- Mykland within Aust-Agder
- Coordinates: 58.6320°N 08.2880°E
- Country: Norway
- County: Aust-Agder
- District: Østre Agder
- Established: 1 Jan 1876
  - Preceded by: Åmli Municipality
- Disestablished: 1 Jan 1967
  - Succeeded by: Froland Municipality
- Administrative centre: Mykland

Government
  - Mayor (1964–1966): Trygve Usterud

Area
  - Total: 299.9 km^{2} (115.8 sq mi)
  - Rank: #276 in Norway
- Highest elevation: 658.12 m (2,159.2 ft)

Population (1966)
  - Total: 609
  - Rank: #453 in Norway
  - Density: 2/km^{2} (5.2/sq mi)
  - Change (10 years): ▼ −15.8%
- Demonym(s): Myklending; Mykling

Official language
  - Norwegian form: Nynorsk
- Time zone: UTC+01:00 (CET)
  - Summer (DST): UTC+02:00 (CEST)
- ISO 3166 code: NO-0932

Mykland is a former municipality in the old Aust-Agder county, Norway. The 299.9-square-kilometre (115.8 sq mi) municipality existed from 1876 until its dissolution in 1967. The area is now part of Froland Municipality in the traditional district of Østre Agder in Agder county. The administrative centre was the village of Mykland where Mykland Church is located. The main roads through the municipality were Norwegian County Road 42 and Norwegian County Road 413.

Prior to its dissolution in 1967, the 299.9-square-kilometre (115.8 sq mi) municipality was the 276th largest by area out of the 460 municipalities in Norway. Mykland Municipality was the 453rd most populous municipality in Norway with a population of about 609. The municipality's population density was 2 inhabitants per square kilometre (5.2/sq mi) and its population had decreased by 15.8% over the previous 10-year period.

== General information ==
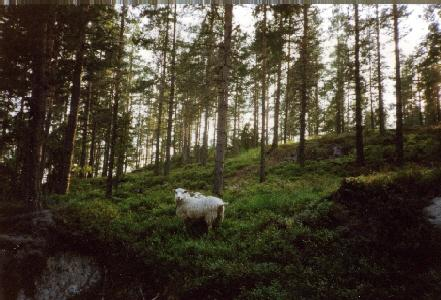
View of a sheep grazing in the forests of Mykland

The municipality of Mykland was established in 1876 when Aamli Municipality was divided into two: the southern district (population: 663) became the new Mykland Municipality and the northern district (population: 2,564) continued as a smaller Aamli Municipality.

During the 1960s, there were many municipal mergers across Norway due to the work of the Schei Committee. After much debate within Mykland Municipality, a vote was held on whether or not to join Åmli Municipality to the north, Froland Municipality to the east, or Birkenes Municipality to the south. A majority of the residents voted to join Froland Municipality, some voted for Åmli Municipality, and no one voted to join Birkenes Municipality. On 1 January 1967, Mykland Municipality was dissolved and the following areas were merged to form an enlarged Froland Municipality:

- all of Mykland Municipality (population: 604)
- all of Froland Municipality (population: 2,768)

On 1 January 1970, the uninhabited properties of Neset and Råbudal in Froland Municipality (which had been a part of Mykland until 1967) were transferred to Birkenes Municipality.

=== Name ===
The municipality (originally the parish) is named after the old Mykland farm (Old Norse: Myklaland) since the first Mykland Church was built there. The first element is the genitive case of the word mikill which means "great" or "prominent". The last element is land which means "land" or "district".

=== Churches ===
The Church of Norway had one parish (sokn) within Mykland Municipality. At the time of the municipal dissolution, it was part of the Herefoss prestegjeld and the Vest-Nedenes prosti (deanery) in the Diocese of Agder.

Churches in Mykland Municipality
Parish (sokn)	Church name	Location of the church	Year built
Mykland	Mykland Church	Mykland	1832

== Geography ==
Mykland Municipality included the inland areas between the rivers Tovdalsåna and the Rettåna (a tributary of the river Otra). The highest point in the municipality was the 658.12-metre (2,159.2 ft) tall mountain Befjell. Tovdal Municipality was located to the north, Åmli Municipality was located to the northeast, Froland Municipality was located to the east, Herefoss Municipality was located to the southeast, Vegusdal Municipality was located to the south, Evje og Hornnes Municipality was located to the west, and Bygland Municipality was located to the northwest.

== Government ==
While it existed, Mykland Municipality was responsible for primary education (through 10th grade), outpatient health services, senior citizen services, welfare and other social services, zoning, economic development, and municipal roads and utilities. The municipality was governed by a municipal council of directly elected representatives. The mayor was indirectly elected by a vote of the municipal council. The municipality was under the jurisdiction of the Nedenes District Court and the Agder Court of Appeal.

=== Municipal council ===
The municipal council (Heradstyre) of Mykland Municipality was made up of 13 representatives that were elected to four year terms. The tables below show the historical composition of the council by political party.

Mykland heradsstyre 1963–1966
Party name (in Nynorsk)	Number of representatives
Labour Party (Arbeidarpartiet)	5
Centre Party (Senterpartiet)	1
Liberal Party (Venstre)	4
Local List(s) (Lokale lister)	3
Total number of members:	13
Note: On 1 January 1967, Mykland Municipality became part of Froland Municipality.

Mykland heradsstyre 1959–1963
Party name (in Nynorsk)	Number of representatives
Labour Party (Arbeidarpartiet)	7
Centre Party (Senterpartiet)	4
Liberal Party (Venstre)	2
Total number of members:	13

Mykland heradsstyre 1955–1959
Party name (in Nynorsk)	Number of representatives
Labour Party (Arbeidarpartiet)	8
Joint List(s) of Non-Socialist Parties (Borgarlege Felleslister)	5
Total number of members:	13

Mykland heradsstyre 1951–1955
Party name (in Nynorsk)	Number of representatives
Labour Party (Arbeidarpartiet)	8
Joint List(s) of Non-Socialist Parties (Borgarlege Felleslister)	4
Total number of members:	12

Mykland heradsstyre 1947–1951
Party name (in Nynorsk)	Number of representatives
Labour Party (Arbeidarpartiet)	7
Joint List(s) of Non-Socialist Parties (Borgarlege Felleslister)	5
Total number of members:	12

Mykland heradsstyre 1945–1947
Party name (in Nynorsk)	Number of representatives
Labour Party (Arbeidarpartiet)	7
Joint List(s) of Non-Socialist Parties (Borgarlege Felleslister)	5
Total number of members:	12

Mykland heradsstyre 1937–1941*
Party name (in Nynorsk)	Number of representatives
Labour Party (Arbeidarpartiet)	7
Joint list of the Farmers' Party (Bondepartiet) and the Liberal Party (Venstre)	5
Total number of members:	12
Note: Due to the German occupation of Norway during World War II, no elections were held for new municipal councils until after the war ended in 1945.

=== Mayors ===
The mayor (Nynorsk: ordførar) of Mykland Municipality was the political leader of the municipality and the chairperson of the municipal council. The following people have held this position:

- 1876–1894: Ellef J. Løvrak
- 1895–1898: Notto N. Mykland
- 1899–1901: Ellef J. Løvrak
- 1902–1907: Notto N. Mykland
- 1908–1910: Nils Auestad
- 1911–1913: Olav Auestad
- 1914–1919: Syvert Mjaaland
- 1920–1922: Gregorius Mjaaland
- 1923–1928: Notto N. Mykland
- 1929–1931: Andreas N. Mykland
- 1932–1934: Tarald O. Mykland
- 1935–1937: Knut Aasen
- 1938–1941: Gunnar Askland
- 1945–1945: Knut Skauland
- 1946–1959: Kjetil Tveit
- 1960–1963: Olav Skripeland
- 1964–1966: Trygve Usterud

== See also ==
- List of former municipalities of Norway
