= Lauvrak =

Village in Froland Municipality, Norway

- Village
- Interactive map of Lauvrak
- Coordinates: 58.6637°N 08.2476°E
- Country: Norway
- Region: Southern Norway
- County: Agder
- District: Østre Agder
- Municipality: Froland Municipality
- Elevation: 231 m (758 ft)
- Time zone: UTC+01:00 (CET)
  - Summer (DST): UTC+02:00 (CEST)
- Post Code: 4832 Mykland

Lauvrak is a village in Froland Municipality in Agder county, Norway. The village is located along the Norwegian County Road 413, about 5 kilometres (3.1 mi) north of the village of Mykland.
