= Libru =

Village in Agder county, Norway

- Village
- Interactive map of Libru
- Coordinates: 58.4779°N 08.6762°E
- Country: Norway
- Region: Southern Norway
- County: Agder
- District: Østre Agder
- Municipality: Arendal and Froland
- Elevation: 41 m (135 ft)
- Time zone: UTC+01:00 (CET)
  - Summer (DST): UTC+02:00 (CEST)
- Post Code: 4848 Arendal

Libru is a village in Agder county, Norway. The village is located in both Arendal Municipality and Froland Municipality. The village lies at the southern end of the lake Assævannet, about 4 kilometres (2.5 mi) southeast of Blakstad in Froland Municipality and about 6 kilometres (3.7 mi) from the town of Arendal in Arendal Municipality. The village of Rise lies along the Arendalsbanen railway line, about 3 kilometres (1.9 mi) to the southwest of Libru.
