= Bøylestad =

Village in Froland Municipality, Norway

- Village
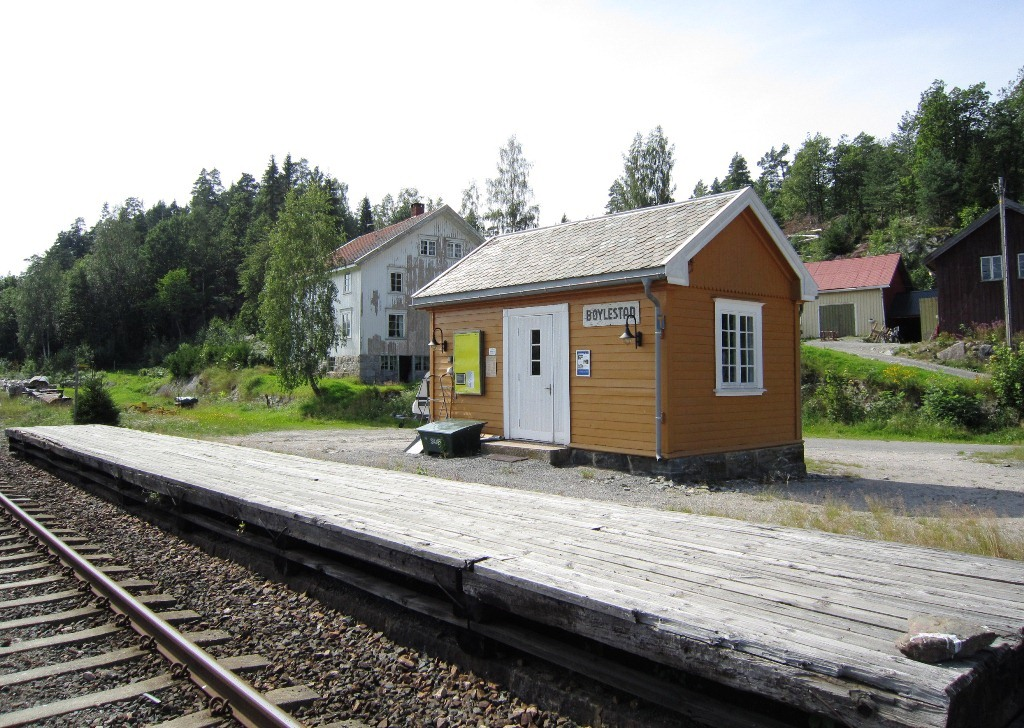
- View of the village train station
- Interactive map of Bøylestad
- Coordinates: 58.5780°N 08.7131°E
- Country: Norway
- Region: Southern Norway
- County: Agder
- District: Østre Agder
- Municipality: Froland Municipality
- Elevation: 67 m (220 ft)
- Time zone: UTC+01:00 (CET)
  - Summer (DST): UTC+02:00 (CEST)
- Post Code: 4820 Froland

Bøylestad is a village in Froland Municipality in Agder county, Norway. The village is located along the river Nidelva about 10 kilometres (6.2 mi) northeast of the village of Osedalen and about 2.5 kilometres (1.6 mi) south of the village of Bøylefoss. The population of Bøylestad (2001) was 214.

The village has a railway station, Bøylestad Station, a part of the Arendalsbanen railway line.
