= Frolands verk =

Village in Froland Municipality, Norway

Frolands verk Froland Verk
- Village
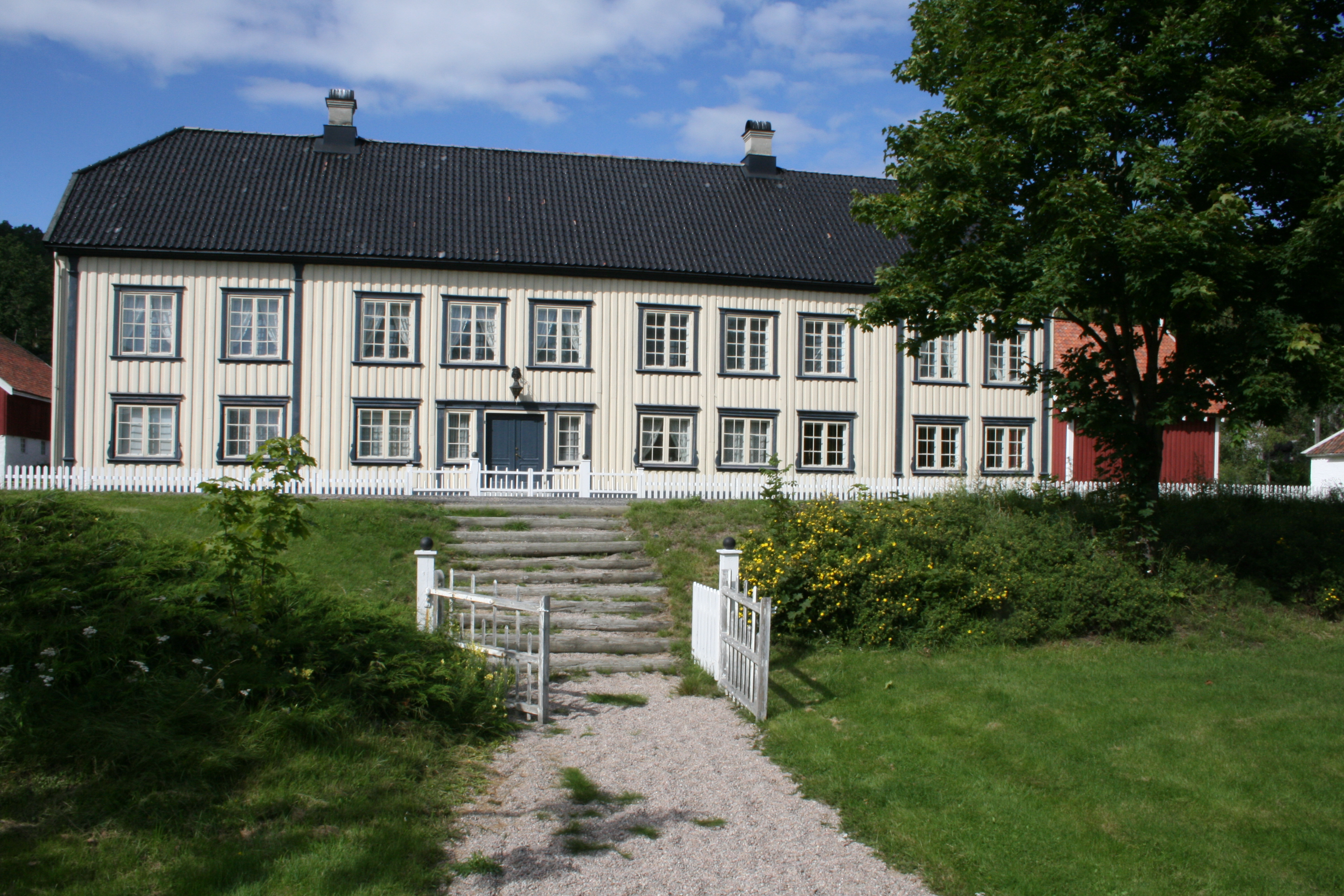
- View of the culture centre in the village
- Interactive map of Frolands verk
- Coordinates: 58.5005°N 08.5793°E
- Country: Norway
- Region: Southern Norway
- County: Agder
- District: Østre Agder
- Municipality: Froland Municipality
- Elevation: 51 m (167 ft)
- Time zone: UTC+01:00 (CET)
  - Summer (DST): UTC+02:00 (CEST)
- Post Code: 4827 Frolands Verk

Frolands verk is a small village area in Froland Municipality in Agder county, Norway. The village is located along the Norwegian County Road 42, almost 5 kilometres (3.1 mi) west of the municipal centre of Blakstad/Osedalen and about 7 kilometres (4.3 mi) southeast of the village of Mjåvatn. The lake Trevann lies just south of the village.

== History ==
Frolands verk was once a large ironworks in the 1700s which produced cannonballs among other things. The ironworks company included large land holdings of farmland and forests in the surrounding area. Historically, the items produced here were shipped down the river Nidelva to the lake Rore in Landvik Municipality and then transported to the sea at the town of Grimstad. After 1867, the ironworks was closed and converted into a sawmill. Today, the main buildings of the company are owned by the municipality and used as a cultural centre.
