= Hinnebu =

Village in Froland Municipality, Norway

- Village
- Interactive map of Hinnebu
- Coordinates: 58.5715°N 08.4805°E
- Country: Norway
- Region: Southern Norway
- County: Agder
- District: Østre Agder
- Municipality: Froland Municipality
- Elevation: 251 m (823 ft)
- Time zone: UTC+01:00 (CET)
  - Summer (DST): UTC+02:00 (CEST)
- Post Code: 4828 Mjåvatn

Hinnebu is a village in Froland Municipality in Agder county, Norway. The village is located along the Norwegian County Road 42, about 5.5 kilometres (3.4 mi) southeast of the village of Hynnekleiv and about 4 kilometres (2.5 mi) north of the village of Mjåvatn.
