= Homstølvatn =

Lake in Agder, Norway

Homstølvatn Eptevatn
- Interactive map of Homstølvatn; Eptevatn
- Location: Froland Municipality, Agder
- Coordinates: 58.69627°N 8.00923°E
- Basin countries: Norway
- First flooded: 1973
- Max. length: 4.7 kilometres (2.9 mi)
- Max. width: 1.8 kilometres (1.1 mi)
- Surface area: 3.92 km^{2} (1.51 sq mi)
- Water volume: 44 cubic megametres (3.6×10^{16} acre⋅ft)
- Surface elevation: 350 metres (1,150 ft)
- References: NVE

Homstølvatn or Eptevatn is a lake in the far western part of Froland Municipality in Agder county, Norway. It is located about 12 kilometres (7.5 mi) east of the village of Byglandsfjord (in Bygland Municipality) and about 16 kilometres (9.9 mi) northwest of the village of Mykland in Froland Municipality.

The lake was expanded in 1973 when a dam was built at the south end of the lake Eptevatn for the purposes of hydroelectric power generation. The dam made the lake larger so that it now includes the formerly separate lake Homstølvatn as one large lake. The lake is now 3.92-square-kilometre (1.51 sq mi) large and it holds about 44 cubic megametres (3.6×10^{16} acre⋅ft) as a reservoir for the power station.

== See also ==
- List of lakes in Aust-Agder
- List of lakes in Norway
