= Mjølhus =

Village in Froland Municipality, Norway

- Village
- Interactive map of Mjølhus
- Coordinates: 58.5145°N 08.6299°E
- Country: Norway
- Region: Southern Norway
- County: Agder
- District: Østre Agder
- Municipality: Froland Municipality
- Elevation: 66 m (217 ft)
- Time zone: UTC+01:00 (CET)
  - Summer (DST): UTC+02:00 (CEST)
- Post Code: 4820 Froland

Mjølhus is a village in Froland Municipality in Agder county, Norway. The village is located on the west shore of the river Nidelva, just north of the municipal centre of Blakstad-Osedalen.
