= Jomås =

Village in Froland Municipality, Norway

- Village
- Interactive map of Jomås
- Coordinates: 58.5997°N 08.6260°E
- Country: Norway
- Region: Southern Norway
- County: Agder
- District: Østre Agder
- Municipality: Froland Municipality
- Elevation: 165 m (541 ft)
- Time zone: UTC+01:00 (CET)
  - Summer (DST): UTC+02:00 (CEST)
- Post Code: 4820 Froland

Jomås is a village in Froland Municipality in Agder county, Norway. The village is located along the Norwegian County Road 152, about half-way between the villages of Heldalsmo and Løvjomås. The village of Blakstad lies about 10 kilometres (6.2 mi) south of Jomås.
