= Nelaug (lake) =

Lake in Agder, Norway

- Store Nelaug
- Interactive map of Nelaug
- Location: Froland and Åmli, Agder
- Coordinates: 58.67461°N 8.58858°E
- Type: Reservoir
- Primary inflows: Nidelva
- Primary outflows: Nidelva
- Basin countries: Norway
- Max. length: 8 kilometres (5.0 mi)
- Max. width: 3 kilometres (1.9 mi)
- Surface area: 10 km^{2} (3.9 sq mi)
- Shore length^{1}: 68 kilometres (42 mi)
- Surface elevation: 138 metres (453 ft)
- References: NVE
- ^{1} Shore length is not a well-defined measure.

Nelaug is a lake in Agder county, Norway. It is located in both Froland Municipality and Åmli Municipality. The 10 kilometres (6.2 mi) lake is formed by a dam which regulates a hydroelectric power plant on the Nidelva river. The village of Nelaug is located near the dam in Froland Municipality. The lake is located about 11 kilometres (6.8 mi) south of the village of Åmli, about 15 kilometres (9.3 mi) southeast of the village of Dølemo, and about 20 kilometres (12 mi) north of Blakstad.

== Name ==
The Old Norse form of the name must have been Niðlaug. The first element is Nið is the old name of the river Nidelva. The word is identical to the Old Norse word nið which means "new moon" or "waning moon". The last element is laug which means "bath" or "hot spring".

== Media gallery ==
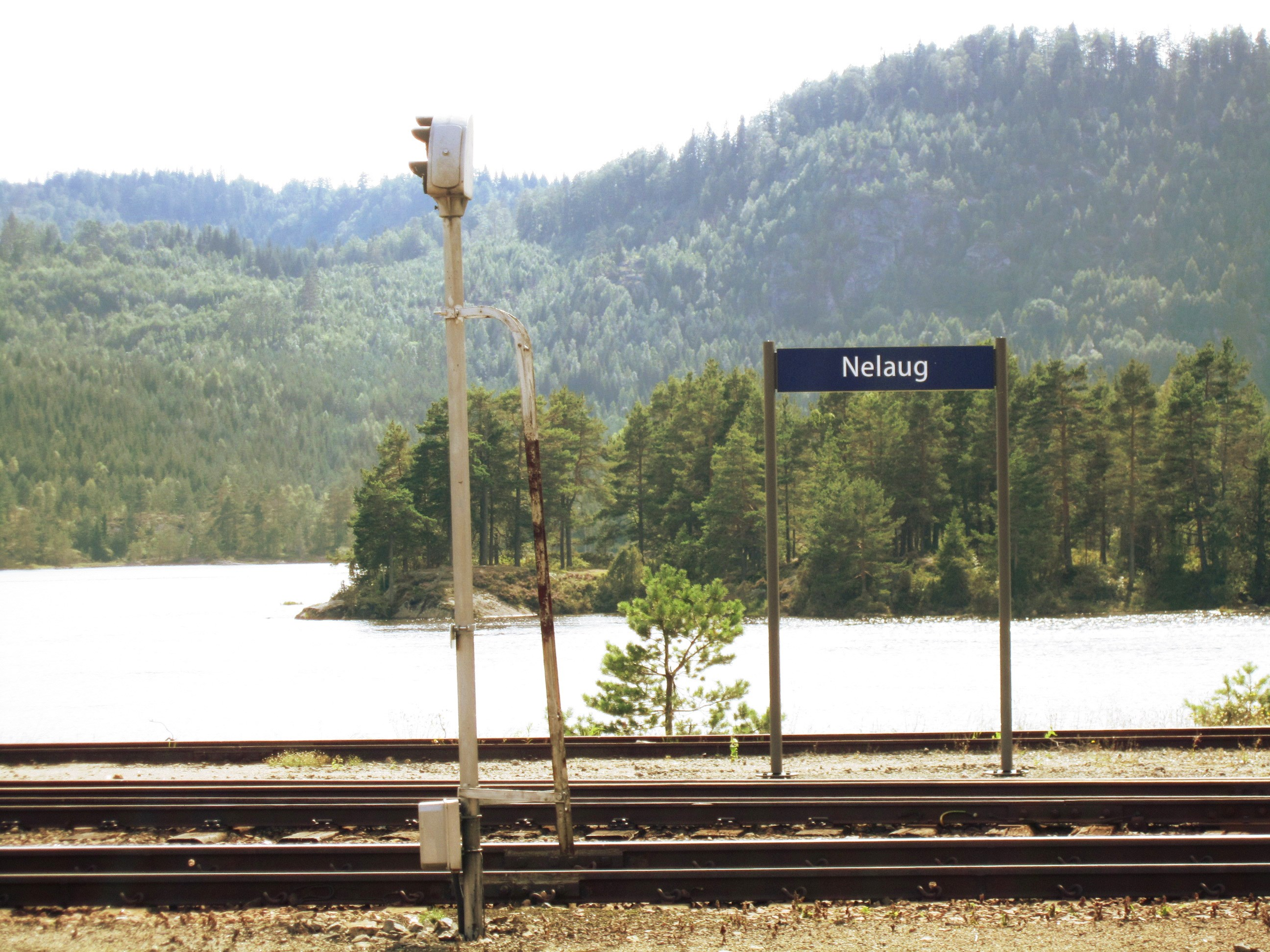
View of the lake near Nelaug Station

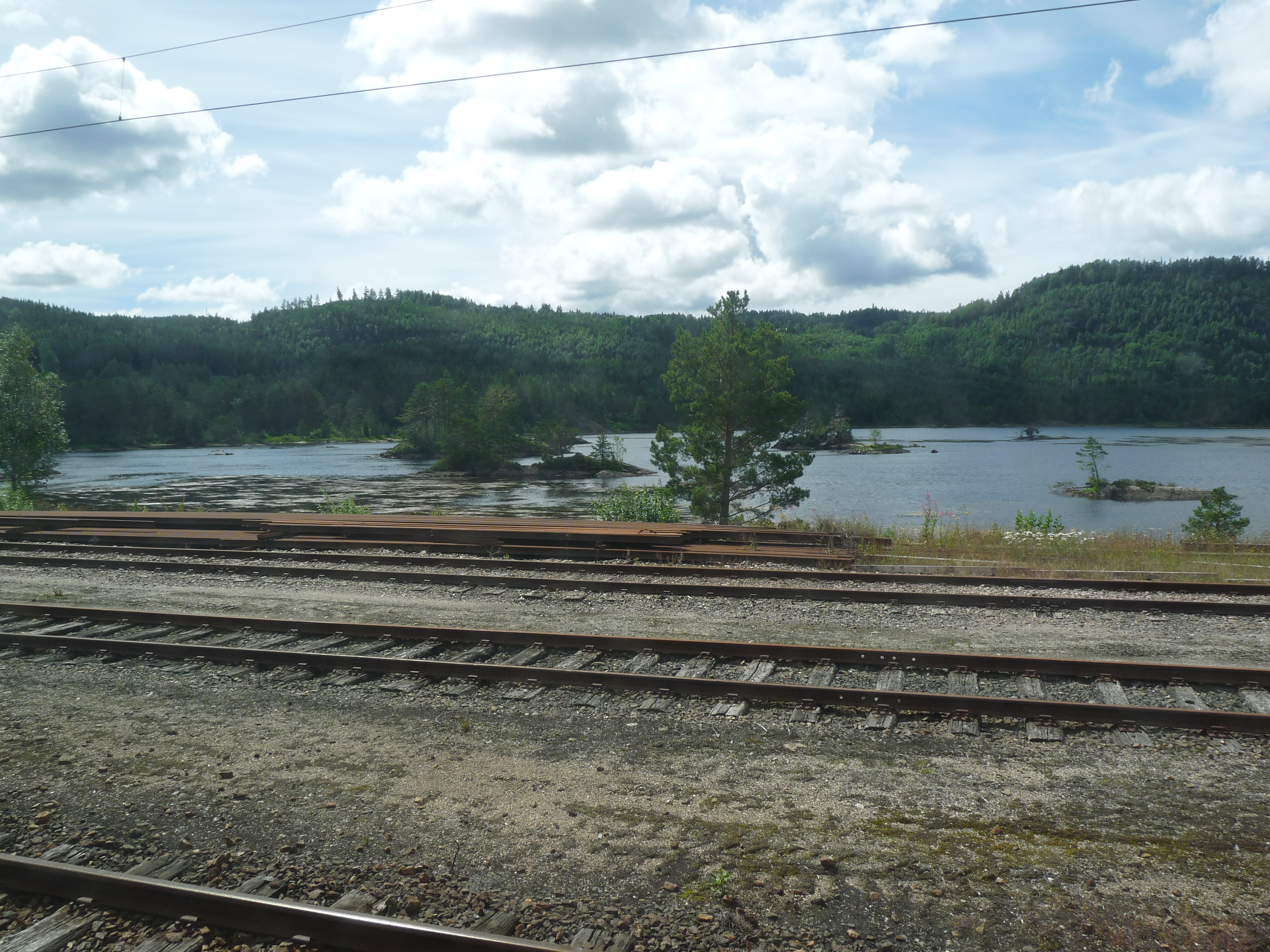
View of the lake near Nelaug Station

== See also ==
- List of lakes in Aust-Agder
