= Bøylefoss =

Village in Froland Municipality, Norway

- Village
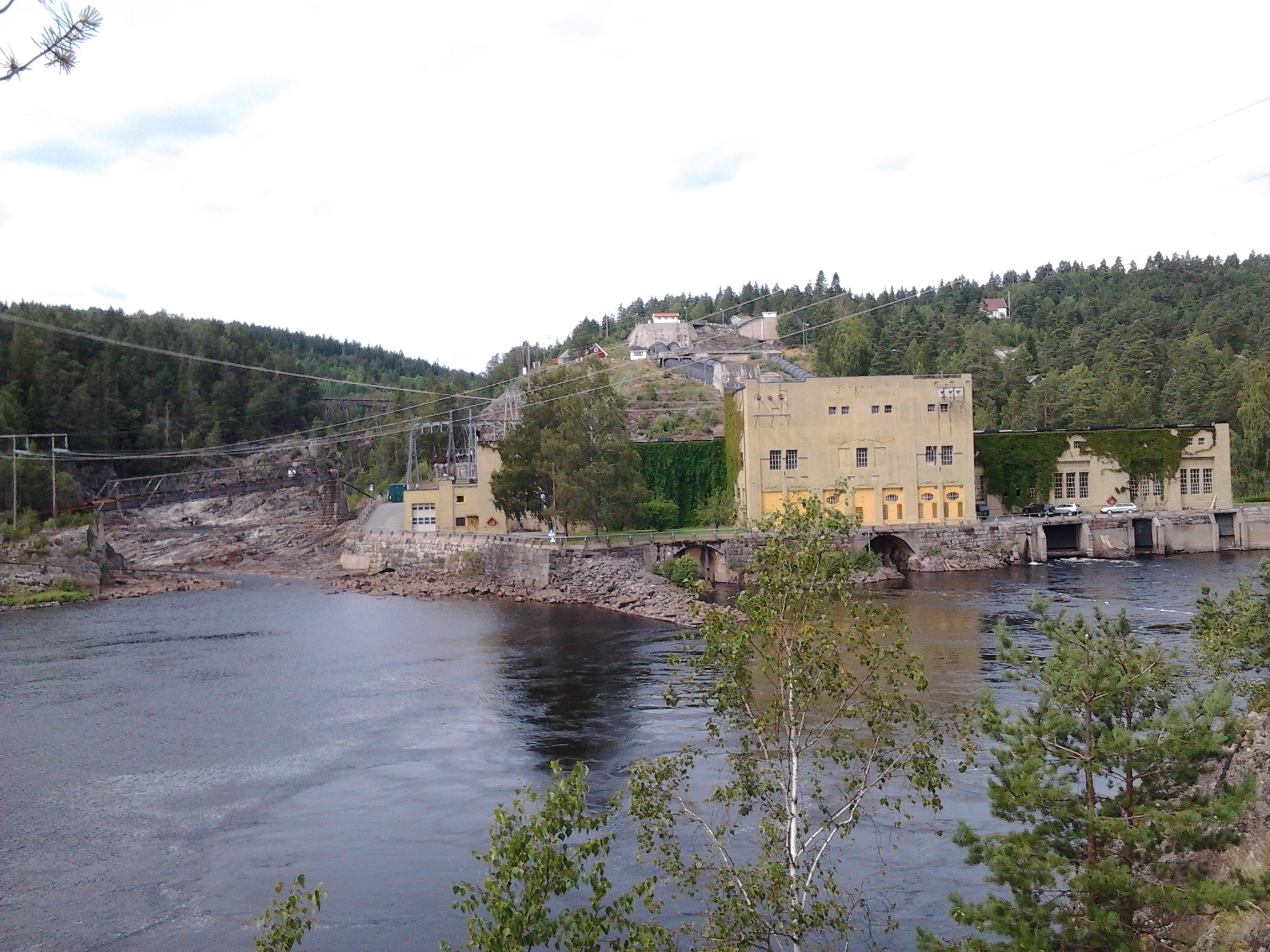
- View of the local power station
- Interactive map of Bøylefoss
- Coordinates: 58.5963°N 08.7164°E
- Country: Norway
- Region: Southern Norway
- County: Agder
- District: Østre Agder
- Municipality: Froland Municipality
- Elevation: 61 m (200 ft)
- Time zone: UTC+01:00 (CET)
  - Summer (DST): UTC+02:00 (CEST)
- Post Code: 4820 Froland

Bøylefoss is a village in Froland Municipality in Agder county, Norway. The village is located along the river Nidelva at the location of the Bøylefoss waterfall. The river is dammed so the waterfall is no longer visible. The water is piped downhill to the Bøylefoss power plant on the shore of the river. There is a very small village near the power plant also called Bøylefoss. The nearby village of Bøylestad lies about 2.5 kilometres (1.6 mi) south of Bøylefoss.
