= Mjåvatn =

Village in Froland Municipality, Norway

- Village
- Interactive map of Mjåvatn
- Coordinates: 58.5387°N 08.4897°E
- Country: Norway
- Region: Southern Norway
- County: Agder
- District: Østre Agder
- Municipality: Froland Municipality
- Elevation: 120 m (390 ft)
- Time zone: UTC+01:00 (CET)
  - Summer (DST): UTC+02:00 (CEST)
- Post Code: 4828 Mjåvatn

Mjåvatn is a village in Froland Municipality in Agder county, Norway. The village is located along Norwegian County Road 42, about 10 kilometres (6.2 mi) northwest of the village of Blakstad/Osedalen, about 4 kilometres (2.5 mi) south of the village of Hinnebu, and about 10 kilometres (6.2 mi) east of the village of Herefoss.
