= Mykland Church =

Church in Agder, Norway

- Mykland kirke
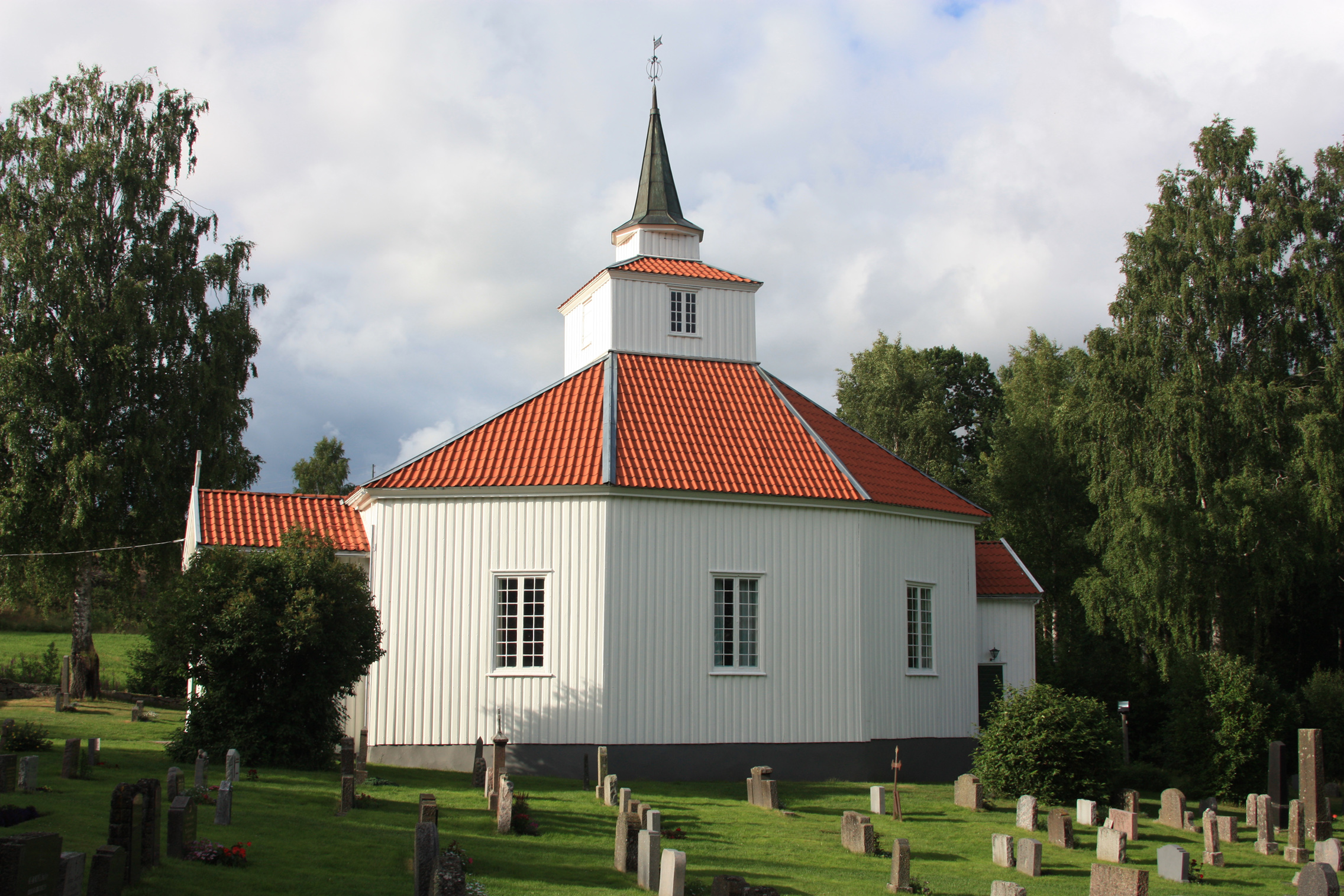
- View of the church
- Mykland Church
- 58.632588°N 08.279669°E
- Location: Froland Municipality, Agder
- Country: Norway
- Denomination: Church of Norway
- Churchmanship: Evangelical Lutheran

History
- Status: Parish church
- Founded: 1683
- Consecrated: 23 Sept 1832

Architecture
- Functional status: Active
- Architect: Gunder Olsen
- Architectural type: Octagonal
- Completed: 1832 (194 years ago)

Specifications
- Capacity: 150
- Materials: Wood

Administration
- Diocese: Agder og Telemark
- Deanery: Arendal prosti
- Parish: Froland
- Norwegian Cultural Heritage Site
- Type: Church
- Status: Listed
- ID: 85078

Mykland Church (Norwegian: Mykland kirke) is a parish church of the Church of Norway in Froland Municipality in Agder county, Norway. It is located in the village of Mykland. It is one of the two churches for the Froland parish which is part of the Arendal prosti (deanery) in the Diocese of Agder og Telemark. The white, wooden church was built in a octagonal design in 1832 using plans drawn up by the architect Gunder Olsen. The church seats about 150 people.

== History ==
Prior to 1683, the residents of the Mykland area had to travel to the stave church in nearby Vegusdal to worship. The King sent a letter to the people of Mykland on 20 December 1681 to inform them that they had permission to build a church in their parish wherever they felt was best. So, in 1683, a church was built in Mykland. It was a timber-framed church using wood from the abundant forests in the area. The church bell was cast in the Netherlands (and it was saved and used in the present church). The church had rows of pews that were assigned to each farm in the parish, with men and women sitting on either side of the church. In 1723, the church was sold during the Norwegian church auction by King Frederick IV to help the finances of the Kingdom of Denmark-Norway after the Great Northern War. The church was owned privately from 1723 until 1806 when the local residents of the parish purchased it.

In 1827, when the Bishop was visiting the church, it was decided that the church was too small for the parish, so planning began for a new church. The old church was demolished in 1829 and the new church was constructed on the same site. The residents wanted an octagonal church like the nearby Hornnes Church and Årdal Church, so they hired Gunder Olsen from Bygland as the architect and lead builder since he had worked on both of those other churches. The new church was completed in 1832 and it was consecrated on 23 September 1832.

== Media gallery ==
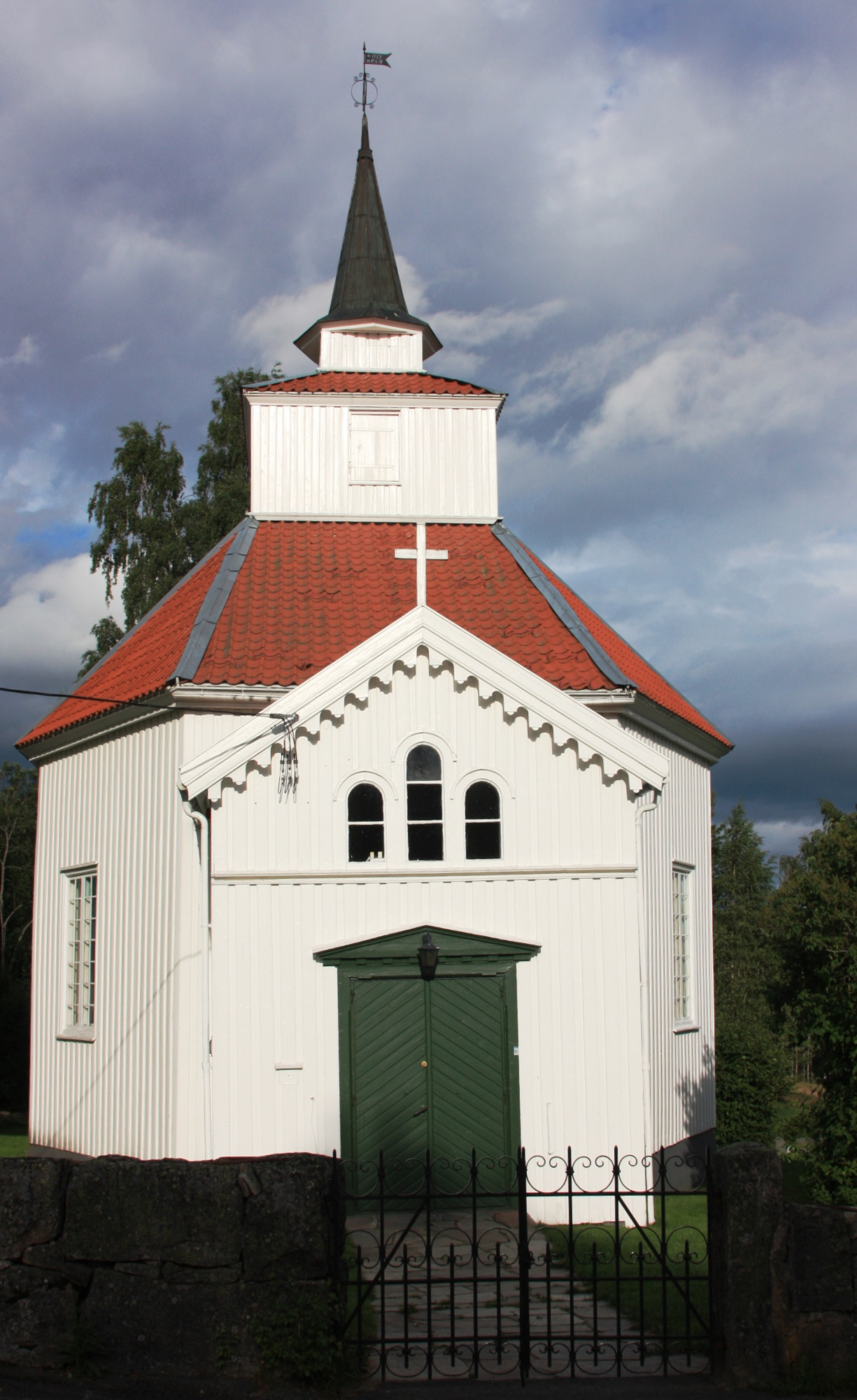

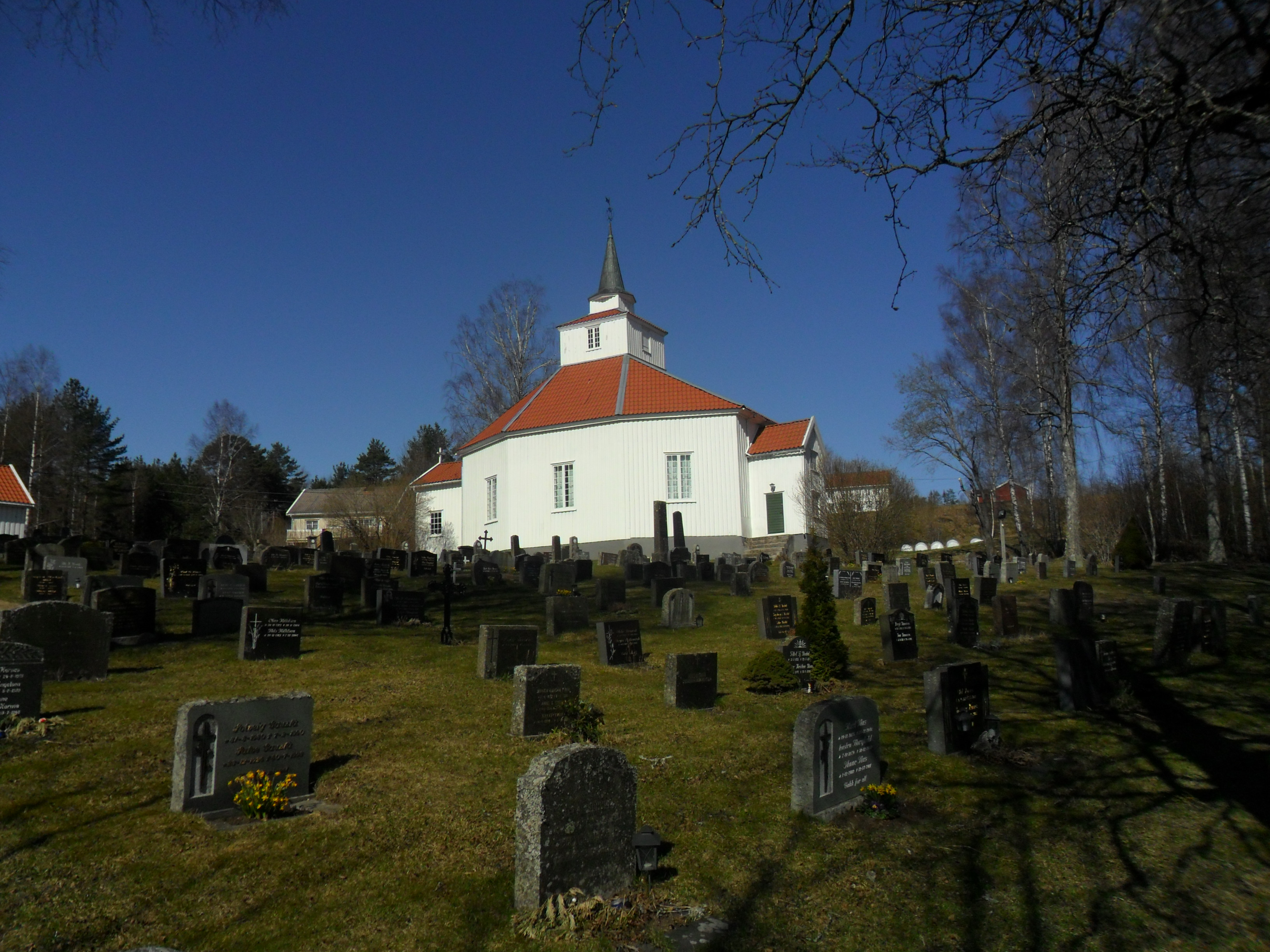

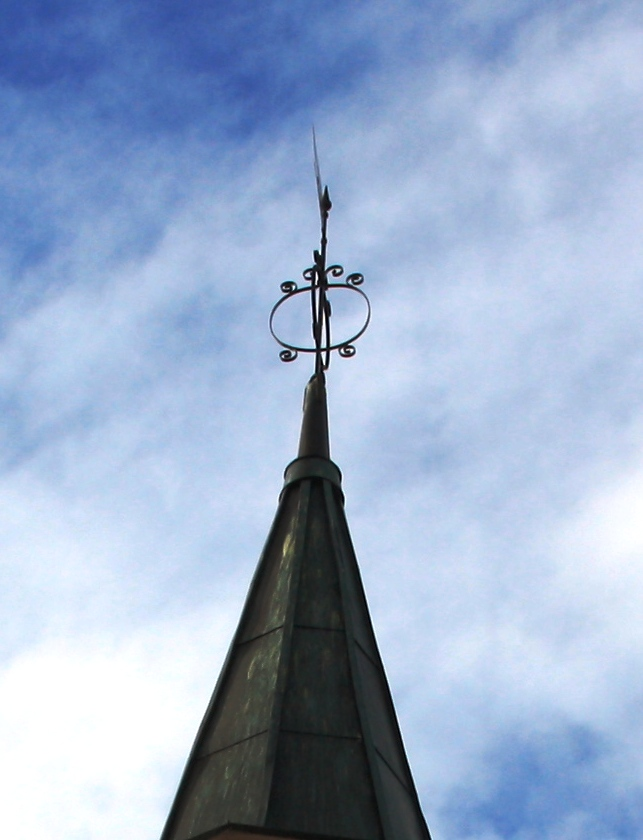

== See also ==
- List of churches in Agder og Telemark
