= Froland (village) =

Village in Froland Municipality, Norway

- Village
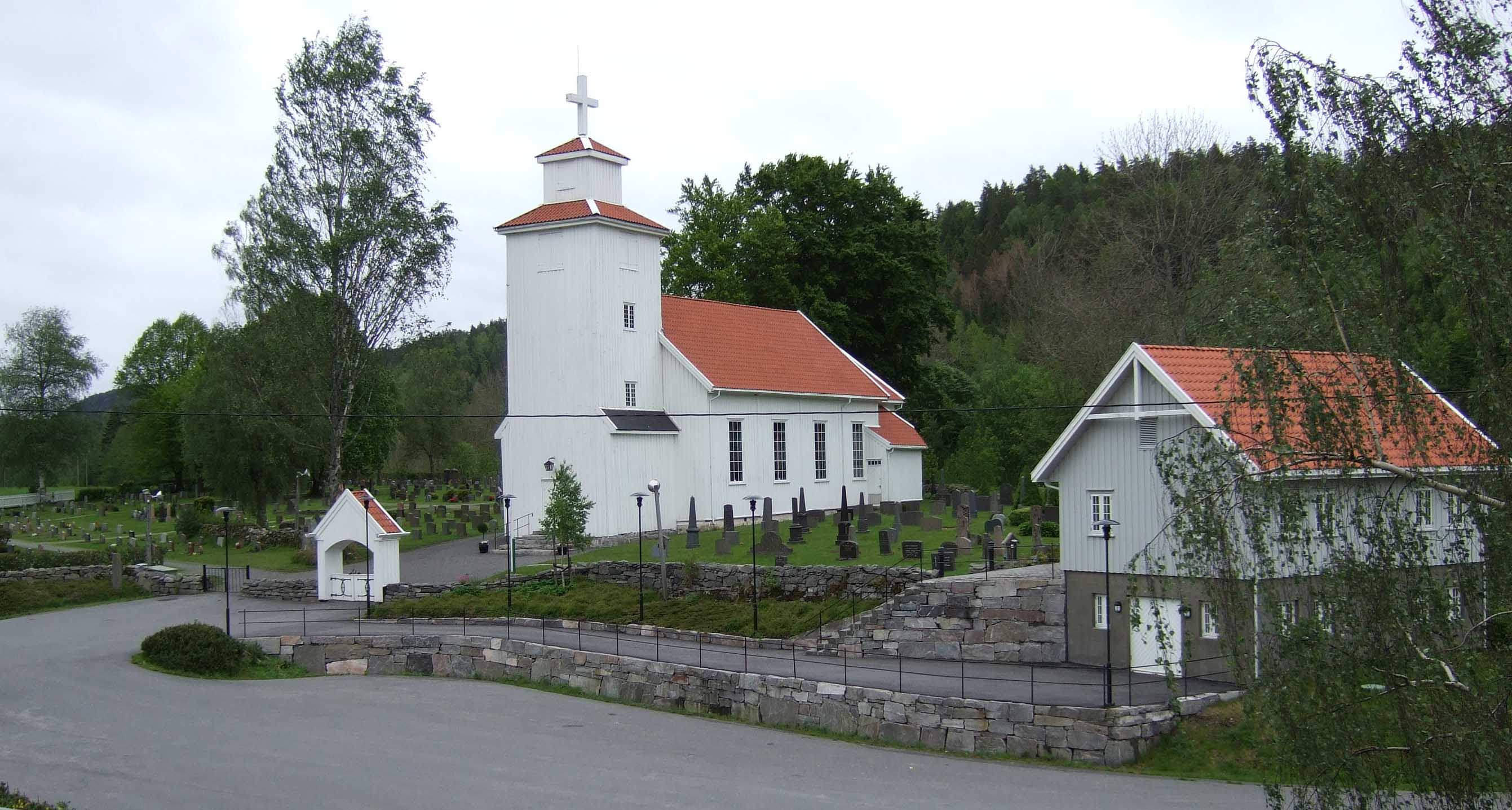
- View of the village church
- Interactive map of Froland
- Coordinates: 58.5306°N 08.6546°E
- Country: Norway
- Region: Southern Norway
- County: Agder
- District: Østre Agder
- Municipality: Froland Municipality
- Elevation: 60 m (200 ft)
- Time zone: UTC+01:00 (CET)
  - Summer (DST): UTC+02:00 (CEST)
- Post Code: 4820 Froland

Froland is a small village in Froland Municipality in Agder county, Norway. The village is located on the western shore of the river Nidelva, just about 3 kilometres (1.9 mi) north of the municipal centre of Osedalen. The village is the site of Froland Church, the main church for the municipality. The Arendalsbanen railway line runs through the village, stopping at Froland Station.
