= Froland Municipality =

Municipality in Agder, Norway

Froland Municipality Froland kommune
- Municipality
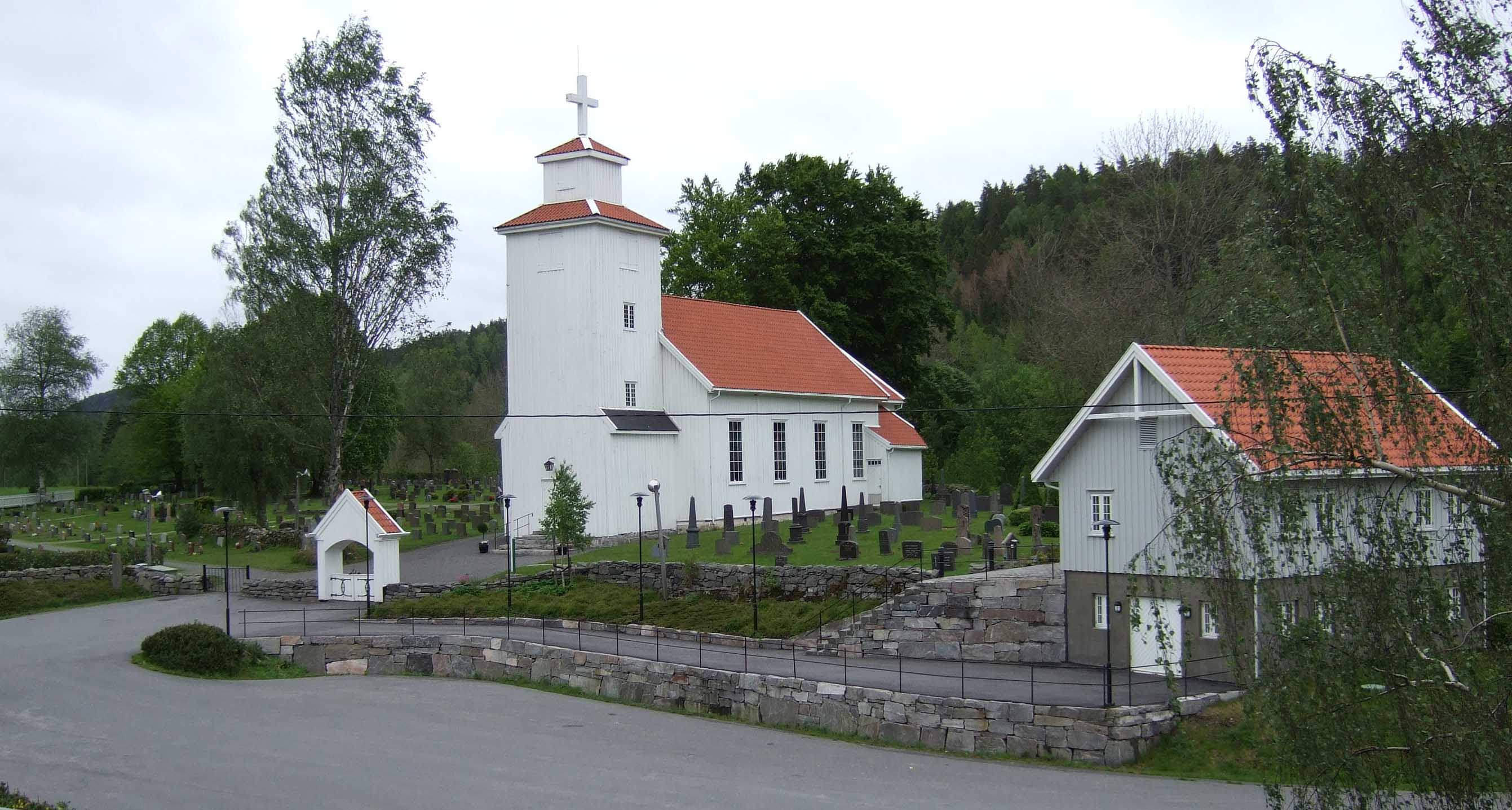
- View of the Froland Church

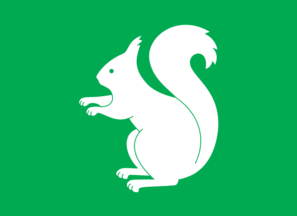
- Flag Coat of arms

- Agder within Norway

- Froland within Agder
- Coordinates: 58°34′59″N 08°34′20″E
- Country: Norway
- County: Agder
- District: Østre Agder
- Established: 1850
  - Preceded by: Øyestad Municipality
- Administrative centre: Blakstad

Government
  - Mayor (2023): Inger-Lene Håland (Ap)

Area
  - Total: 644.54 km^{2} (248.86 sq mi)
  - Land: 601.01 km^{2} (232.05 sq mi)
  - Water: 43.53 km^{2} (16.81 sq mi) 6.8%
  - Rank: #176 in Norway
- Highest elevation: 658.12 m (2,159.2 ft)

Population (2026)
  - Total: 6,299
  - Rank: #155 in Norway
  - Density: 10.5/km^{2} (27/sq mi)
  - Change (10 years): ▲ +12.1%
- Demonym: Frolending

Official language
  - Norwegian form: Neutral
- Time zone: UTC+01:00 (CET)
  - Summer (DST): UTC+02:00 (CEST)
- ISO 3166 code: NO-4214
- Website: Official website

Froland is a municipality in Agder county, Norway. The 644.54-square-kilometre (248.86 sq mi) municipality has existed since 1850. It is part of the traditional region of Østre Agder. The administrative center is the village of Blakstad, which along with Osedalen form the main population center of the municipality. Other villages in Froland include Bøylefoss, Bøylestad, Froland, Frolands verk, Heldalsmo, Hinnebu, Hynnekleiv, Jomås, Lauvrak, Libru, Løvjomås, Mjåvatn, Mjølhus, Mykland, and Risdal.

The 644.54-square-kilometre (248.86 sq mi) municipality is the 176th largest by area out of the 357 municipalities in Norway. Froland Municipality is the 155th most populous municipality in Norway with a population of 6,299. The municipality's population density is 10.5 inhabitants per square kilometre (27/sq mi) and its population has increased by 12.1% over the previous 10-year period.

== General information ==
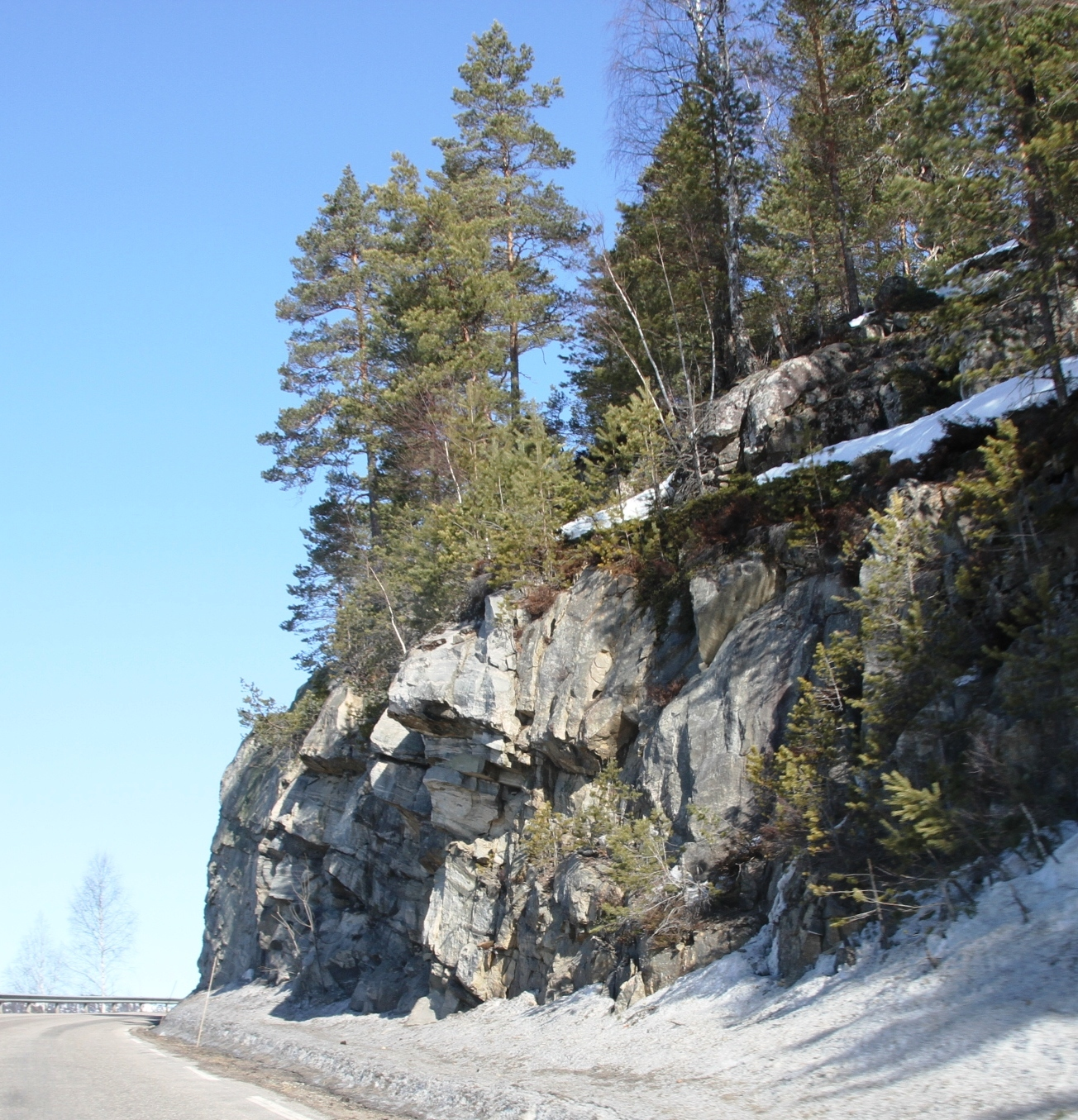
Landscape of Froland

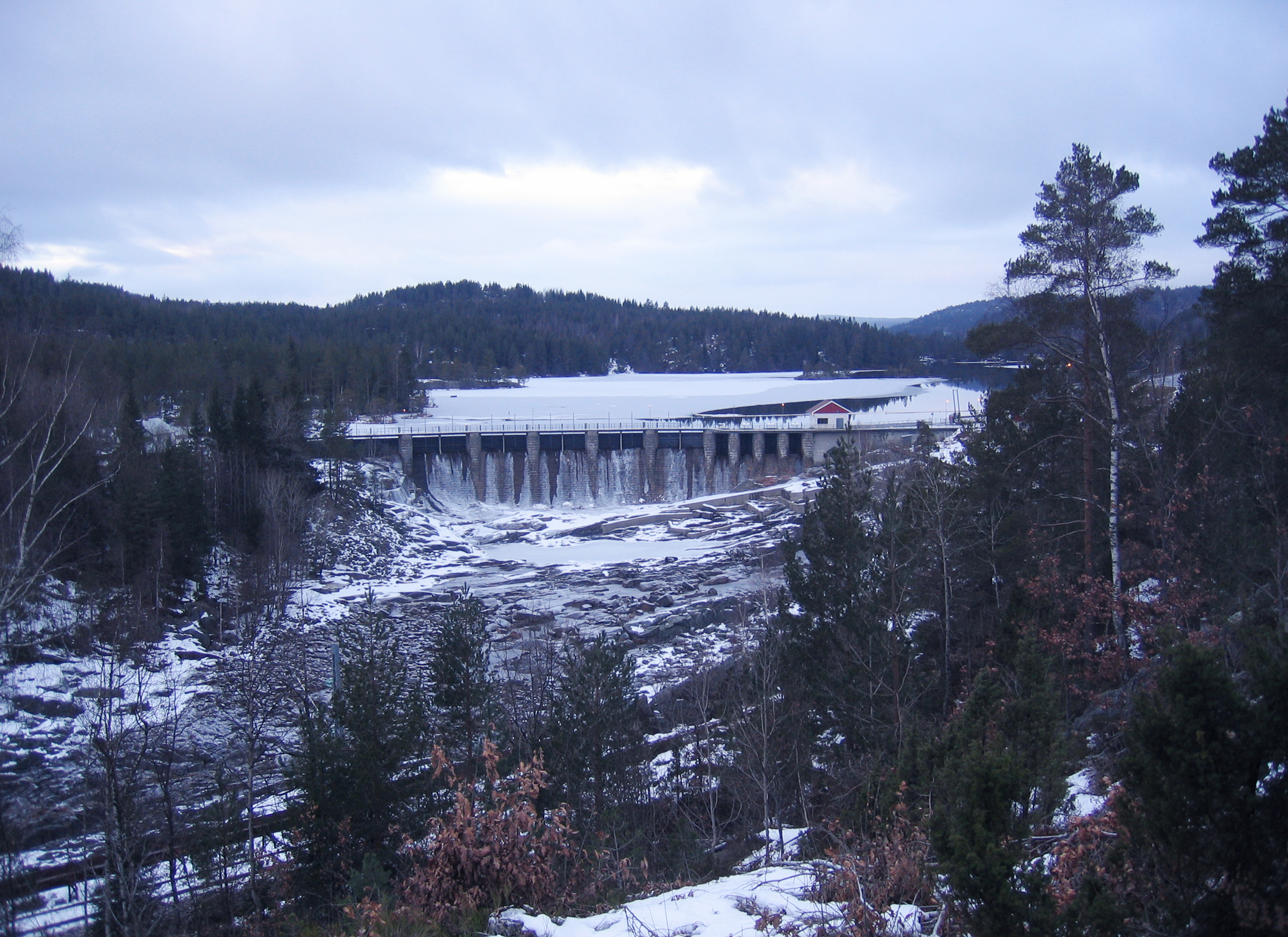
Dam near the Bøylefoss power station

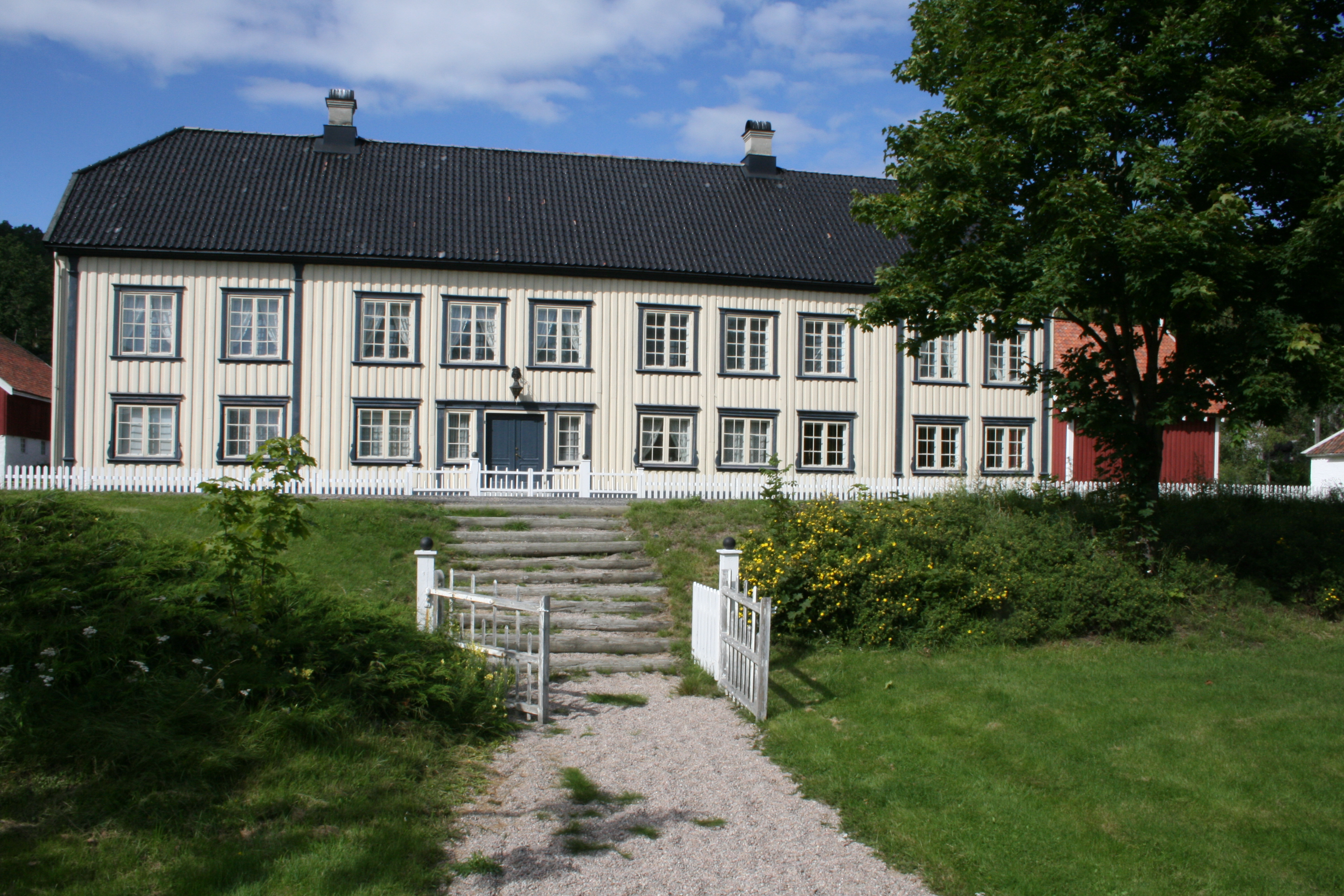
Frolands verk museum

=== Administrative history ===
The municipality of Froland was established in 1850 when Øyestad Municipality was divided into two: the western district (population: 1,976) became the new Froland Municipality and the eastern district (population: 5,215) continued as a smaller Øyestad Municipality.

During the 1960s, there were many municipal mergers across Norway due to the work of the Schei Committee. On 1 January 1967, the following areas were merged to form an enlarged Froland Municipality:

- all of Froland Municipality (population: 2,768)
- all of Mykland Municipality (population: 604)

On 1 January 1968, the Flateland area of neighboring Åmli Municipality (population: 6) was transferred to Froland Municipality. On 1 January 1970, the two uninhabited areas of Neset and Råbudal were separated from Froland Municipality and transferred to neighboring Birkenes Municipality. Then on 1 January 1979, the uninhabited Landheia area was transferred from Froland Municipality to Birkenes Municipality. On 1 January 1991, the Dalen area in Birkenes Municipality (population: 60) was transferred from Birkenes Municipality to Froland Municipality.

In 2020, there were many municipal and county mergers across Norway due to the work of the Solberg cabinet. Historically, this municipality was part of the old Aust-Agder county. On 1 January 2020, the municipality became a part of the newly-formed Agder county (after Aust-Agder and Vest-Agder counties were merged).

=== Name ===
The municipality (originally the parish) is named after the old Froland farm (Old Norse: Fróðaland) since the first Froland Church was built there. The first element is the genitive case of the male name Fróði. The last element is land which means "land" or "district".

=== Coat of arms ===
The coat of arms was granted on 17 January 1986. The official blazon is "Vert, a squirrel sejant erect argent" (Norwegian: I grønt et sølv ekorn). This means the arms have a green field (background) and the charge is a squirrel sitting on its haunches with its front paws raised. The squirrel has a tincture of argent which means it is commonly colored white, but if it is made out of metal, then silver is used. The green color in the field and the squirrel was chosen as a symbol for the forests and wildlife in the municipality. The arms were designed by David Rike. The municipal flag has the same design as the coat of arms.

=== Churches ===
The Church of Norway has one parish (sokn) within Froland Municipality. It is part of the Arendal prosti (deanery) in the Diocese of Agder og Telemark.

Churches in Froland Municipality
Parish (sokn)	Church name	Location of the church	Year built
Froland	Froland Church	Froland	1718
Froland	Mykland Church	Mykland	1832

== History ==
The iron production facility, Frolands verk, was founded in 1763 and continued in production through 1867. After that the facility became a sawmill. Today the main building from 1791 is a historically protected building, and the old stables are used as a cultural center.

== Geography ==
The municipality is bordered on the north by Åmli Municipality; on the east by Tvedestrand Municipality; on the south by Arendal Municipality, Grimstad Municipality, and Birkenes Municipality; and on the west by Evje og Hornnes Municipality and Bygland Municipality.

The large rivers Nidelva and Tovdalselva both run through the municipality. There are also many lakes in Froland including Homstølvatn, Nelaug, Nystølfjorden, and Uldalsåna. The highest point in the municipality is the 658.12-metre (2,159.2 ft) tall mountain Befjell.

=== Climate ===
Climate data for Hynnekleiv 1991–2020 (162 m, avg high/low 2012-2025)
Month	Jan	Feb	Mar	Apr	May	Jun	Jul	Aug	Sep	Oct	Nov	Dec	Year
Mean daily maximum °C (°F)	0.5 (32.9)	2.7 (36.9)	6.5 (43.7)	10.9 (51.6)	16.6 (61.9)	20.6 (69.1)	22.3 (72.1)	20.5 (68.9)	16.6 (61.9)	10.6 (51.1)	5.3 (41.5)	1.9 (35.4)	11.3 (52.3)
Daily mean °C (°F)	−2.7 (27.1)	−2.6 (27.3)	0.2 (32.4)	4.3 (39.7)	9.6 (49.3)	13.7 (56.7)	15.8 (60.4)	14.5 (58.1)	10.8 (51.4)	5.8 (42.4)	1.7 (35.1)	−2.2 (28.0)	5.7 (42.3)
Mean daily minimum °C (°F)	−6.4 (20.5)	−5.6 (21.9)	−3.5 (25.7)	−1.2 (29.8)	4 (39)	8.4 (47.1)	10.3 (50.5)	9.4 (48.9)	7.3 (45.1)	3 (37)	−0.7 (30.7)	−4.2 (24.4)	1.7 (35.1)
Average precipitation mm (inches)	97 (3.8)	62 (2.4)	59 (2.3)	64 (2.5)	68 (2.7)	86 (3.4)	82 (3.2)	109 (4.3)	123 (4.8)	138 (5.4)	124 (4.9)	105 (4.1)	1,117 (43.8)
Source 1: yr.no/Norwegian Meteorological Institute
Source 2: Seklima (avg highs/lows)

== Government ==
Froland Municipality is responsible for primary education (through 10th grade), outpatient health services, senior citizen services, welfare and other social services, zoning, economic development, and municipal roads and utilities. The municipality is governed by a municipal council of directly elected representatives. The mayor is indirectly elected by a vote of the municipal council. The municipality is under the jurisdiction of the Agder District Court and the Agder Court of Appeal.

=== Municipal council ===
The municipal council (Kommunestyre) of Froland Municipality is made up of 19 representatives that are elected to four year terms. The tables below show the current and historical composition of the council by political party.

Froland kommunestyre 2023–2027
Party name (in Norwegian)	Number of representatives
Labour Party (Arbeiderpartiet)	4
Progress Party (Fremskrittspartiet)	4
Conservative Party (Høyre)	1
The Conservatives (Konservativt)	2
Christian Democratic Party (Kristelig Folkeparti)	4
Centre Party (Senterpartiet)	3
Socialist Left Party (Sosialistisk Venstreparti)	1
Total number of members:	19

Froland kommunestyre 2019–2023
Party name (in Norwegian)	Number of representatives
Labour Party (Arbeiderpartiet)	4
Progress Party (Fremskrittspartiet)	3
Conservative Party (Høyre)	1
The Christians Party (Partiet De Kristne)	1
Christian Democratic Party (Kristelig Folkeparti)	6
Centre Party (Senterpartiet)	4
Total number of members:	19

Froland kommunestyre 2015–2019
Party name (in Norwegian)	Number of representatives
Labour Party (Arbeiderpartiet)	5
Progress Party (Fremskrittspartiet)	3
Conservative Party (Høyre)	1
Christian Democratic Party (Kristelig Folkeparti)	6
Centre Party (Senterpartiet)	4
Total number of members:	19

Froland kommunestyre 2011–2015
Party name (in Norwegian)	Number of representatives
Labour Party (Arbeiderpartiet)	4
Progress Party (Fremskrittspartiet)	3
Conservative Party (Høyre)	2
Christian Democratic Party (Kristelig Folkeparti)	4
Centre Party (Senterpartiet)	6
Total number of members:	19

Froland kommunestyre 2007–2011
Party name (in Norwegian)	Number of representatives
Labour Party (Arbeiderpartiet)	4
Progress Party (Fremskrittspartiet)	3
Christian Democratic Party (Kristelig Folkeparti)	3
Centre Party (Senterpartiet)	7
Total number of members:	17

Froland kommunestyre 2003–2007
Party name (in Norwegian)	Number of representatives
Labour Party (Arbeiderpartiet)	4
Progress Party (Fremskrittspartiet)	3
Conservative Party (Høyre)	1
Christian Democratic Party (Kristelig Folkeparti)	3
Centre Party (Senterpartiet)	5
Socialist Left Party (Sosialistisk Venstreparti)	1
Total number of members:	17

Froland kommunestyre 1999–2003
Party name (in Norwegian)	Number of representatives
Labour Party (Arbeiderpartiet)	8
Progress Party (Fremskrittspartiet)	3
Conservative Party (Høyre)	1
Christian Democratic Party (Kristelig Folkeparti)	5
Centre Party (Senterpartiet)	2
Socialist Left Party (Sosialistisk Venstreparti)	1
Liberal Party (Venstre)	1
Total number of members:	21

Froland kommunestyre 1995–1999
Party name (in Norwegian)	Number of representatives
Labour Party (Arbeiderpartiet)	9
Progress Party (Fremskrittspartiet)	2
Conservative Party (Høyre)	2
Christian Democratic Party (Kristelig Folkeparti)	4
Centre Party (Senterpartiet)	6
Socialist Left Party (Sosialistisk Venstreparti)	1
Liberal Party (Venstre)	1
Total number of members:	25

Froland kommunestyre 1991–1995
Party name (in Norwegian)	Number of representatives
Labour Party (Arbeiderpartiet)	10
Progress Party (Fremskrittspartiet)	1
Conservative Party (Høyre)	2
Christian Democratic Party (Kristelig Folkeparti)	3
Centre Party (Senterpartiet)	6
Socialist Left Party (Sosialistisk Venstreparti)	2
Liberal Party (Venstre)	1
Total number of members:	25

Froland kommunestyre 1987–1991
Party name (in Norwegian)	Number of representatives
Labour Party (Arbeiderpartiet)	13
Conservative Party (Høyre)	2
Christian Democratic Party (Kristelig Folkeparti)	3
Centre Party (Senterpartiet)	5
Liberal Party (Venstre)	2
Total number of members:	25

Froland kommunestyre 1983–1987
Party name (in Norwegian)	Number of representatives
Labour Party (Arbeiderpartiet)	13
Conservative Party (Høyre)	3
Christian Democratic Party (Kristelig Folkeparti)	4
Centre Party (Senterpartiet)	4
Liberal Party (Venstre)	1
Total number of members:	25

Froland kommunestyre 1979–1983
Party name (in Norwegian)	Number of representatives
Labour Party (Arbeiderpartiet)	12
Conservative Party (Høyre)	4
Christian Democratic Party (Kristelig Folkeparti)	4
Centre Party (Senterpartiet)	4
Liberal Party (Venstre)	1
Total number of members:	25

Froland kommunestyre 1975–1979
Party name (in Norwegian)	Number of representatives
Labour Party (Arbeiderpartiet)	11
Christian Democratic Party (Kristelig Folkeparti)	6
Centre Party (Senterpartiet)	5
Socialist Left Party (Sosialistisk Venstreparti)	1
Liberal Party (Venstre)	2
Total number of members:	25

Froland kommunestyre 1971–1975
Party name (in Norwegian)	Number of representatives
Labour Party (Arbeiderpartiet)	14
Christian Democratic Party (Kristelig Folkeparti)	4
Centre Party (Senterpartiet)	3
Socialist People's Party (Sosialistisk Folkeparti)	1
Liberal Party (Venstre)	3
Total number of members:	25

Froland kommunestyre 1967–1971
Party name (in Norwegian)	Number of representatives
Labour Party (Arbeiderpartiet)	13
Christian Democratic Party (Kristelig Folkeparti)	3
Centre Party (Senterpartiet)	4
Socialist People's Party (Sosialistisk Folkeparti)	2
Liberal Party (Venstre)	3
Total number of members:	25

Froland kommunestyre 1963–1967
Party name (in Norwegian)	Number of representatives
Labour Party (Arbeiderpartiet)	10
Christian Democratic Party (Kristelig Folkeparti)	2
Centre Party (Senterpartiet)	2
Socialist People's Party (Sosialistisk Folkeparti)	1
Liberal Party (Venstre)	2
Total number of members:	17

Froland herredsstyre 1959–1963
Party name (in Norwegian)	Number of representatives
Labour Party (Arbeiderpartiet)	9
Communist Party (Kommunistiske Parti)	1
Christian Democratic Party (Kristelig Folkeparti)	2
Centre Party (Senterpartiet)	3
Liberal Party (Venstre)	2
Total number of members:	17

Froland herredsstyre 1955–1959
Party name (in Norwegian)	Number of representatives
Labour Party (Arbeiderpartiet)	9
Communist Party (Kommunistiske Parti)	1
Christian Democratic Party (Kristelig Folkeparti)	3
Farmers' Party (Bondepartiet)	2
Liberal Party (Venstre)	2
Total number of members:	17

Froland herredsstyre 1951–1955
Party name (in Norwegian)	Number of representatives
Labour Party (Arbeiderpartiet)	9
Communist Party (Kommunistiske Parti)	1
Christian Democratic Party (Kristelig Folkeparti)	1
Farmers' Party (Bondepartiet)	2
Liberal Party (Venstre)	3
Total number of members:	16

Froland herredsstyre 1947–1951
Party name (in Norwegian)	Number of representatives
Labour Party (Arbeiderpartiet)	8
Communist Party (Kommunistiske Parti)	1
Christian Democratic Party (Kristelig Folkeparti)	2
Farmers' Party (Bondepartiet)	1
Liberal Party (Venstre)	4
Total number of members:	16

Froland herredsstyre 1945–1947
Party name (in Norwegian)	Number of representatives
Labour Party (Arbeiderpartiet)	9
Communist Party (Kommunistiske Parti)	1
Farmers' Party (Bondepartiet)	2
Liberal Party (Venstre)	4
Total number of members:	16

Froland herredsstyre 1937–1941*
Party name (in Norwegian)	Number of representatives
Labour Party (Arbeiderpartiet)	8
Farmers' Party (Bondepartiet)	2
Liberal Party (Venstre)	6
Total number of members:	16
Note: Due to the German occupation of Norway during World War II, no elections were held for new municipal councils until after the war ended in 1945.

=== Mayors ===
The mayor (Norwegian: ordfører) of Froland Municipality is the political leader of the municipality and the chairperson of the municipal council. The following people have held this position:

- 1850–1851: Simon O. Evenstad
- 1851–1853: Niels N. Træsnes
- 1853–1857: Lorentz Ditlev Krog
- 1857–1858: Jørgen O. Berget
- 1858–1861: Kittel K. Dale
- 1861–1865: Gjeruld K. Haugaas
- 1865–1868: Kittel K. Dale
- 1868–1870: Thor T. Solem
- 1870–1870: Jørgen O. Berget
- 1870–1871: Thor T. Solem
- 1871–1875: Osuld T. Homstøl
- 1875–1879: Erik G. Espeland
- 1879–1882: Jacob G. Hurv
- 1882–1885: Osmund S. Løvrak
- 1885–1887: Osuld T. Homstøl
- 1887–1889: Gunder S. Kalhovd
- 1889–1893: Jens T. Hurv
- 1893–1897: Gisle N. Espeland
- 1897–1911: Rasmus O. Sparsaas
- 1911–1914: Anders Dalen
- 1914–1920: Anton Hellum
- 1920–1929: Torjus Homstøl
- 1929–1932: Eivind Setane
- 1932–1945: Nils G. Espeland
- 1945–1945: Kristoffer Møllerløkken
- 1945–1946: Oskar Moripen
- 1946–1947: Steffen Ravnåsen
- 1947–1968: Osulv Kleivane
- 1968–1975: Lars Mjåvatn (Ap)
- 1975–1979: Erik Usterud (Sp)
- 1979–1983: Ståle Haraldstad (Sp)
- 1983–2003: Aadne K. Mykland (Ap)
- 2003–2015: Sigmund Pedersen (Sp)
- 2015–2023: Ove Gundersen (KrF)
- 2023–present: Inger-Lene Håland (Ap)

== Transportation ==
The Arendalsbanen railway which runs from Nelaug to Arendal connects Froland Municipality and Arendal Municipality to the railway system in Norway. Blakstad Station is in the municipal centre of Blakstad, Froland Station is located in the village of Froland, and Bøylestad Station is in the village of Bøylestad.

There are also several highways in the municipality including the Norwegian National Road 41, Norwegian County Road 408, and Norwegian County Road 413.

== Media ==
The newspaper Frolendingen is published in Froland.

== Notable people ==
- Niels Henrik Abel (1802–1829 in Froland), a distinguished mathematician who was buried at Froland cemetery
- Iver Steen Thomle (1812 in Froland – 1889), a jurist and Chief Justice of the Supreme Court of Norway from 1878–86
- Gotfred Kvifte (1914 in Froland – 1997), a physicist and academic
- Marte Olsbu Røiseland (born 1990), a biathlete who was a triple gold medalist at the 2022 Winter Olympics and team silver medalist at the 2018 Winter Olympics who resides in Froland.
