= Hynnekleiv =

Village in Froland Municipality, Norway

- Village
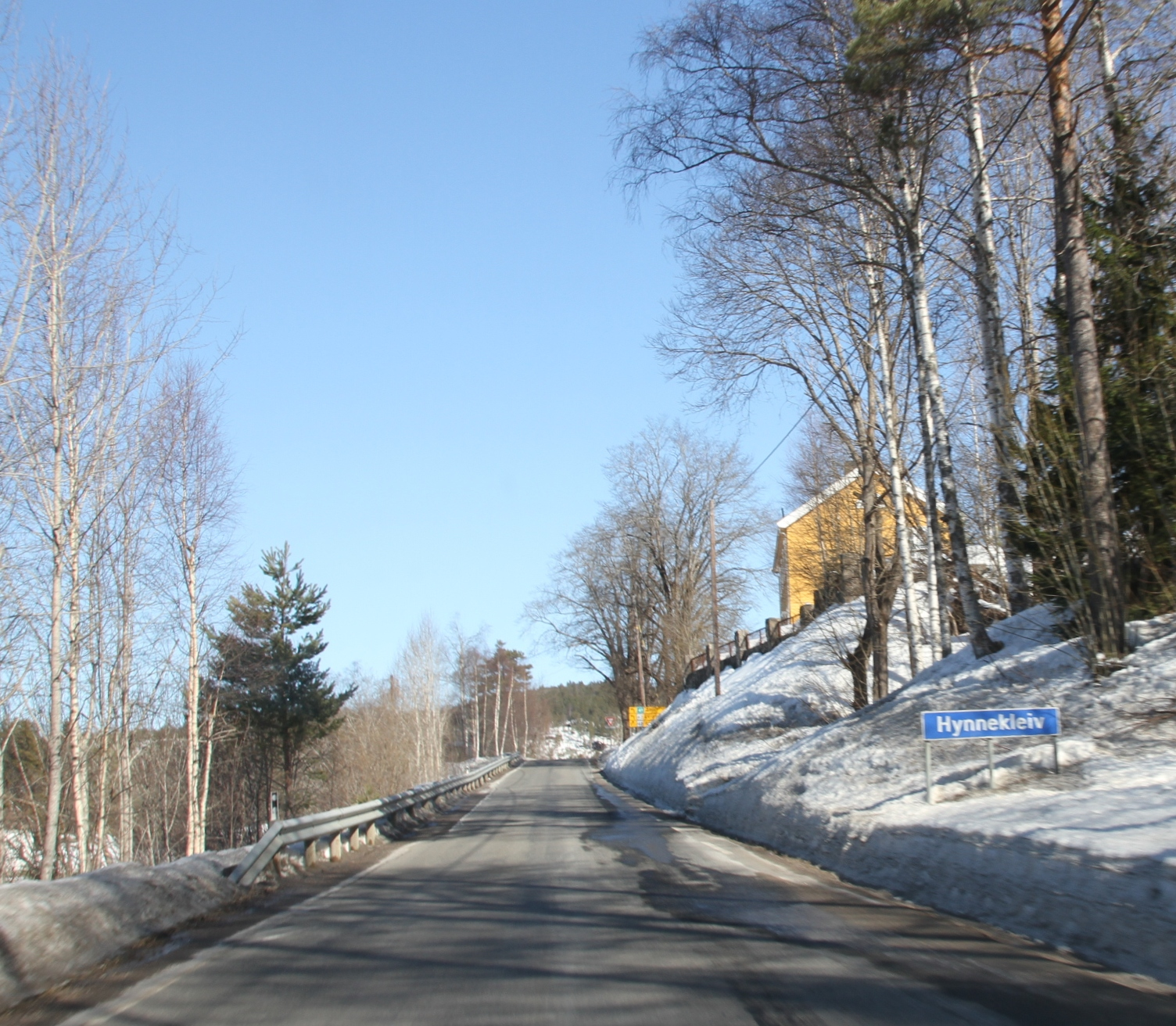
- View of the road leading into the village
- Interactive map of Hynnekleiv
- Coordinates: 58.6020°N 08.4181°E
- Country: Norway
- Region: Southern Norway
- County: Agder
- District: Østre Agder
- Municipality: Froland Municipality
- Elevation: 159 m (522 ft)
- Time zone: UTC+01:00 (CET)
  - Summer (DST): UTC+02:00 (CEST)
- Post Code: 4830 Hynnekleiv

Hynnekleiv is a village in Froland Municipality in Agder county, Norway. The village is located at the junction of the Norwegian National Road 41 and the Norwegian County Road 42. The Sørlandsbanen railway line runs through the village as well, but the railway station here was closed in 2003. The river Tovdalselva flows past the village on the west side.

== Climate ==
Climate data for Hynnekleiv 1991–2020 (162 m, avg high/low 2012-2025)
Month	Jan	Feb	Mar	Apr	May	Jun	Jul	Aug	Sep	Oct	Nov	Dec	Year
Mean daily maximum °C (°F)	0.5 (32.9)	2.7 (36.9)	6.5 (43.7)	10.9 (51.6)	16.6 (61.9)	20.6 (69.1)	22.3 (72.1)	20.5 (68.9)	16.6 (61.9)	10.6 (51.1)	5.3 (41.5)	1.9 (35.4)	11.3 (52.3)
Daily mean °C (°F)	−2.7 (27.1)	−2.6 (27.3)	0.2 (32.4)	4.3 (39.7)	9.6 (49.3)	13.7 (56.7)	15.8 (60.4)	14.5 (58.1)	10.8 (51.4)	5.8 (42.4)	1.7 (35.1)	−2.2 (28.0)	5.7 (42.3)
Mean daily minimum °C (°F)	−6.4 (20.5)	−5.6 (21.9)	−3.5 (25.7)	−1.2 (29.8)	4 (39)	8.4 (47.1)	10.3 (50.5)	9.4 (48.9)	7.3 (45.1)	3 (37)	−0.7 (30.7)	−4.2 (24.4)	1.7 (35.1)
Average precipitation mm (inches)	97 (3.8)	62 (2.4)	59 (2.3)	64 (2.5)	68 (2.7)	86 (3.4)	82 (3.2)	109 (4.3)	123 (4.8)	138 (5.4)	124 (4.9)	105 (4.1)	1,117 (43.8)
Source 1: yr.no/Norwegian Meteorological Institute
Source 2: Seklima (avg highs/lows)
