= Mykland (village) =

Village in Froland Municipality, Norway

- Village
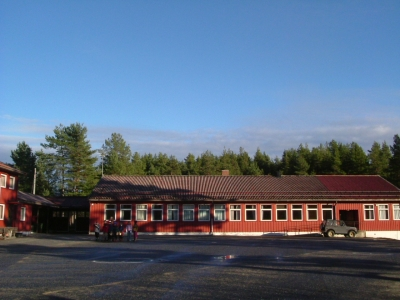
- View of the village school
- Interactive map of Mykland
- Coordinates: 58.6320°N 08.2880°E
- Country: Norway
- Region: Southern Norway
- County: Agder
- District: Østre Agder
- Municipality: Froland Municipality
- Elevation: 252 m (827 ft)
- Time zone: UTC+01:00 (CET)
  - Summer (DST): UTC+02:00 (CEST)
- Post Code: 4832 Mykland
- Website: http://www.mykland.org

Mykland is a rural village in northwestern Froland Municipality in Agder county, Norway. It is located along the Norwegian County Road 42 about 28 kilometres (17 mi) northwest of the village of Blakstad and about 30 kilometres (19 mi) southwest of the village of Åmli. The village is located in a hilly, forested area that is the site of many small rivers and lakes. The village has a school, store, gas station, and Mykland Church.

== History ==
The village of Mykland was the administrative centre of the old Mykland Municipality which existed from 1876 until 1967 when the municipality was merged into Froland Municipality.

In the summer of 2008, there was a major forest fire in the areas surrounding the village of Mykland. The fire was one of the worst forest fires of the last 150 years in Norway. Nearly 30,000 decares (7,400 acres) of forest burned. The fire was fought by more than 300 people from the fire department, the military, the civil defense, and the Red Cross. The village of Mykland was threatened by the fire from three sides. Several summer cabins burned but fortunately there was no inhabited housing that was lost.

=== Name ===
The municipality (originally the parish) is named after the old Mykland farm (Old Norse: Myklaland), since the first Mykland Church was built there. The first element is mykill which means "great" and the last element is land which means "land".

== Attractions ==
Mykland has great scenery of hills and forests along with many fishing lakes and many camping locations. Canoeing in the nearby lake Myklandsvatna is also quite popular. There is also a museum and a shooting range in Mykland.

Mykland Church is a small wooden, octagonal church that dates back to 1832, with angels in the sky painted on the ceiling inside. Mykland has had a church since 1682.

== Notable people ==
- Nils Belland, an artist
- Knut Mykland, a historian
