= Froland Church =

Church in Agder, Norway

- Froland kirke
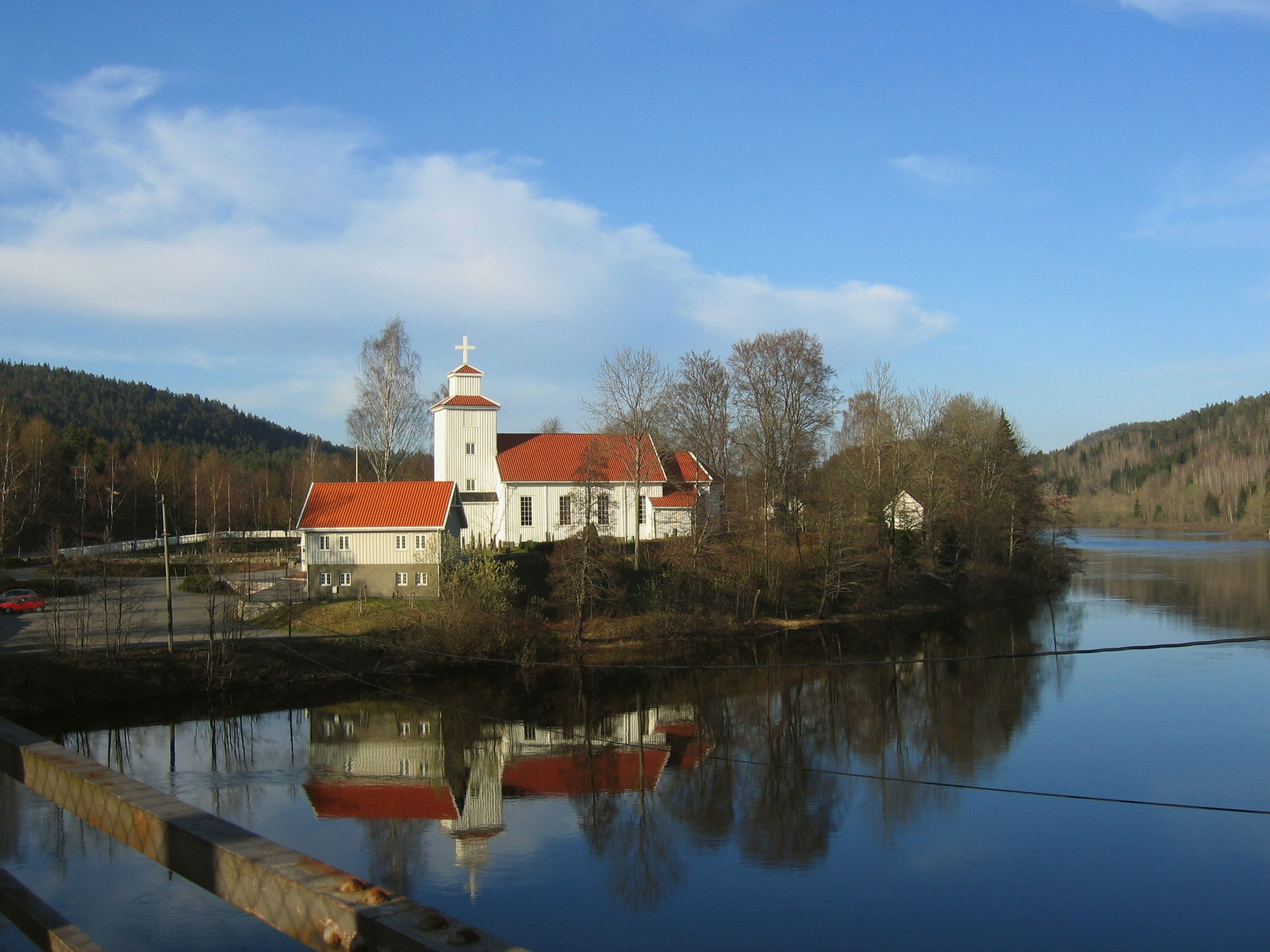
- View of the church
- Froland Church
- 58.525989°N 08.651811°E
- Location: Froland Municipality, Agder
- Country: Norway
- Denomination: Church of Norway
- Previous denomination: Catholic Church
- Churchmanship: Evangelical Lutheran

History
- Status: Parish church
- Founded: 14th-century
- Consecrated: 1 Nov 1718

Architecture
- Functional status: Active
- Architectural type: Long church
- Completed: 1718 (308 years ago)

Specifications
- Capacity: 295
- Materials: Wood

Administration
- Diocese: Agder og Telemark
- Deanery: Arendal prosti
- Parish: Froland
- Norwegian Cultural Heritage Site
- Type: Church
- Status: Automatically protected
- ID: 84205

Froland Church (Norwegian: Froland kirke) is a parish church of the Church of Norway in Froland Municipality in Agder county, Norway. It is located in the village of Froland. It is one of the two churches for the Froland parish which is part of the Arendal prosti (deanery) in the Diocese of Agder og Telemark. The white, wooden church was built in a long church design in 1718 using plans drawn up by an unknown architect. The church seats about 295 people.

== History ==
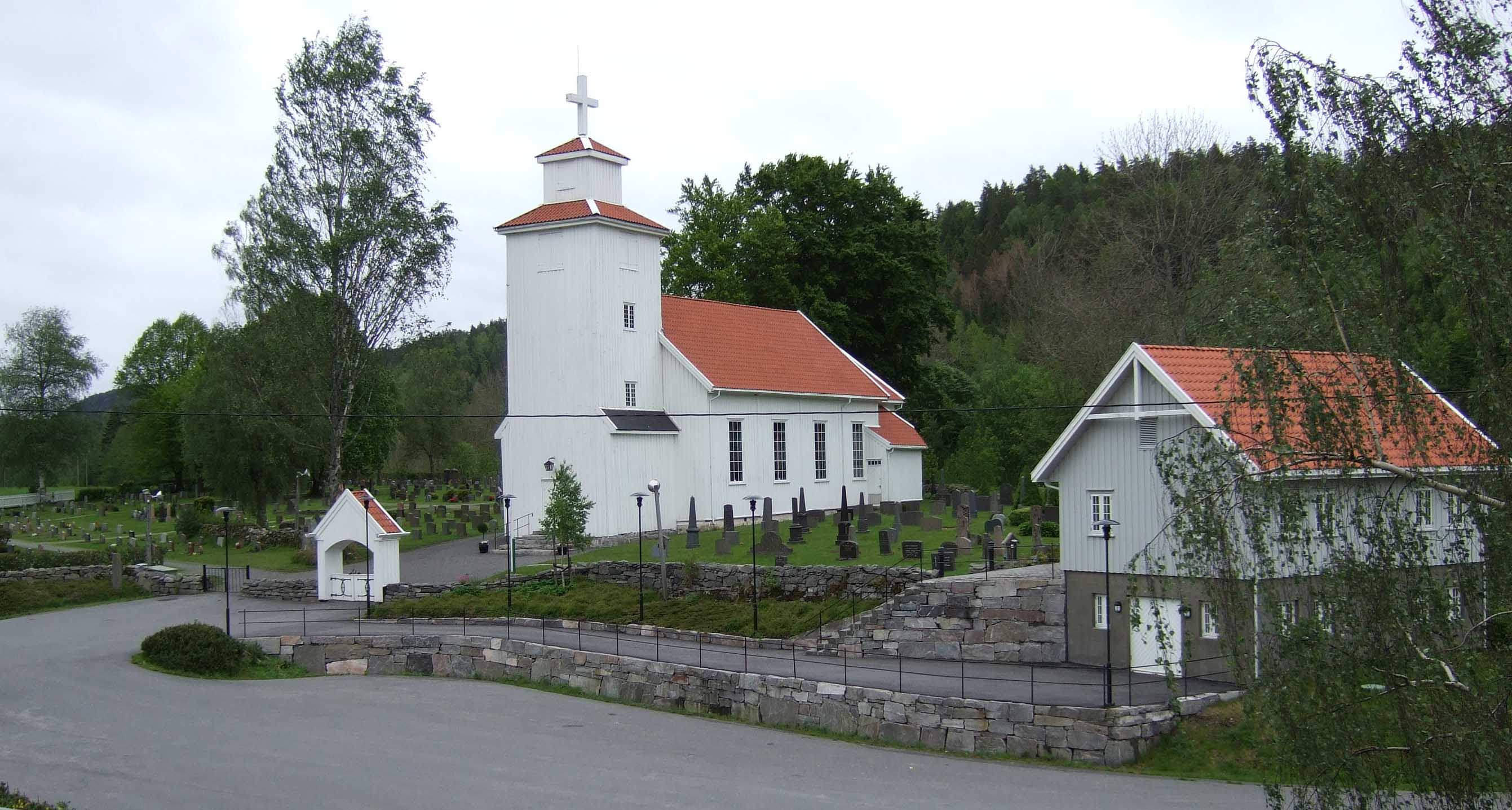
View of the church

The earliest existing historical records of the parish date back to the year 1399 and the earliest existing records of the church are from 1425 as the "Frodelands Sogn i Nidardal", however the church was likely founded during the late 13th or early 14th century (before the Black Death in Norway). By the beginning of the 1700s, the old church was quite dilapidated, so in 1704 there was a royal resolution that stipulated that the old church be torn down and replaced. However, Bishop Jens Bircherod would not allow the church to be torn down before the financing for the new was in order. He asked every farm to deliver timber for the new church. During the demolition of the old church 1715, old idols were found which were thrown into the nearby river. The new church was completed in 1718 on the site of the old church. The new church was consecrated on 1 November 1718. In 1727, a large tower and steeple was built above a new entry porch. In 1887, the church was enlarged to the east. The old choir was torn down, the nave was lengthened by 3 metres (9.8 ft), and then a new choir built at the east end of the building. A sacristy was built on the north and south sides of the new choir as well. After World War II, a complete restoration of the church was carried out.

== See also ==
- List of churches in Agder og Telemark
