= Blakstad, Agder =

Village in Froland Municipality, Norway

Blakstad Osedalen
- Village
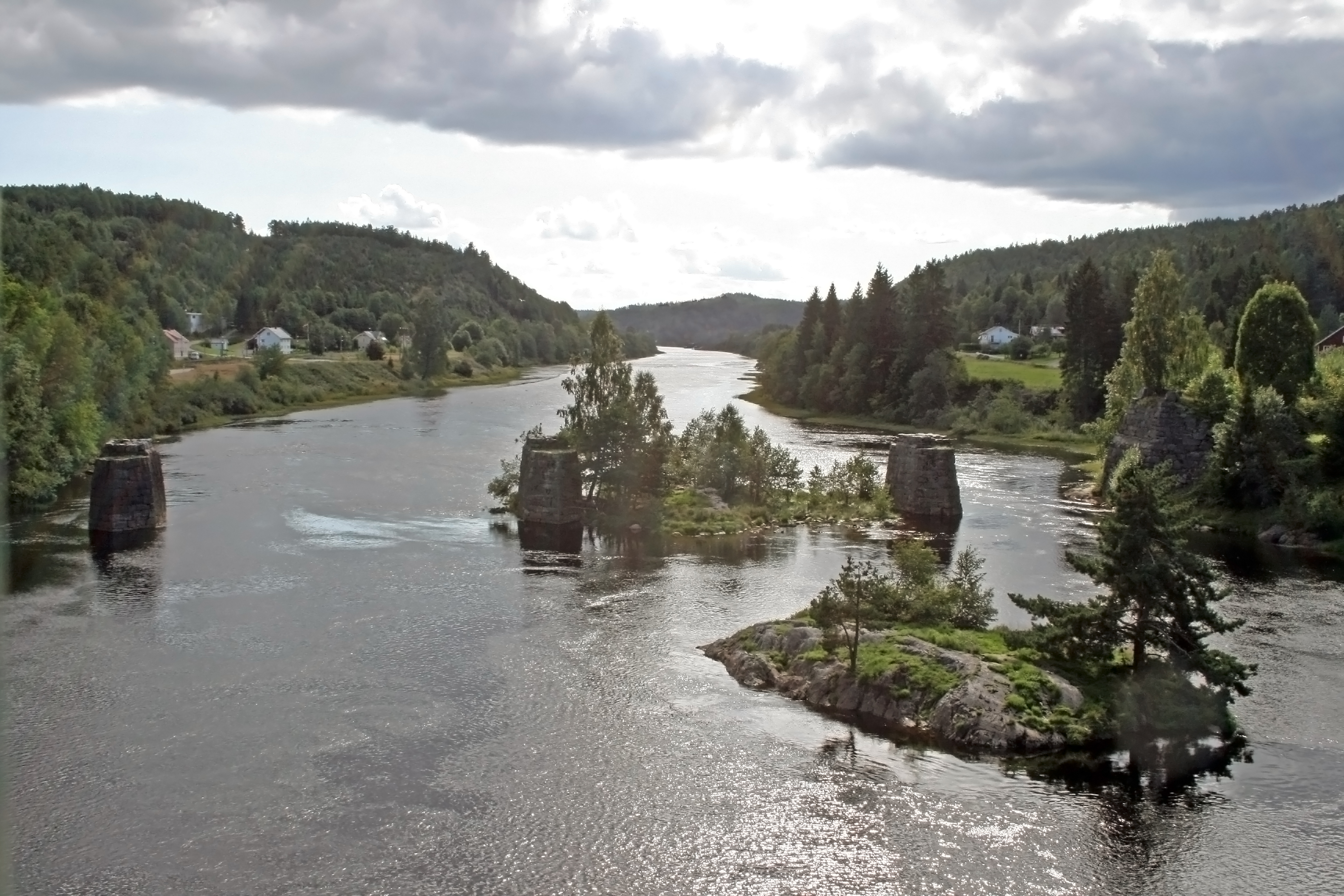
- View of the Nidelva river through Blakstad
- Interactive map of the village
- Coordinates: 58.5054°N 08.6433°E
- Country: Norway
- Region: Southern Norway
- County: Agder
- District: Østre Agder
- Municipality: Froland Municipality

Area
  - Total: 2.77 km^{2} (1.07 sq mi)
- Elevation: 58 m (190 ft)

Population (2025)
  - Total: 3,448
  - Density: 1,245/km^{2} (3,220/sq mi)
- Time zone: UTC+01:00 (CET)
  - Summer (DST): UTC+02:00 (CEST)
- Post Code: 4820 Froland

Blakstad or Osedalen is the administrative centre of Froland Municipality in Agder county, Norway. The village is located along the river Nidelva, about 10 kilometres (6.2 mi) northwest of the town of Arendal (where many residents of Blakstad work and shop). The small village of Froland lies about 3 kilometres (1.9 mi) to the north, on the west side of the river, and that is where Froland Church is located.

Originally, Blakstad was the village on the eastern shore of the river and the village of Osedalen was located on the western side of the river. Over the years, the two villages grew together through conurbation and now form one large village. The 2.77-square-kilometre (680-acre) village has a population (2025) of 3,448 and a population density of 1,245 inhabitants per square kilometre (3,220/sq mi).

The Arendalsbanen railway line, a branch of the Sørlandsbanen railway line stops at the Blakstad Station. The Norwegian County Road 420 and Norwegian County Road 408 also run through the village.

== Media gallery ==
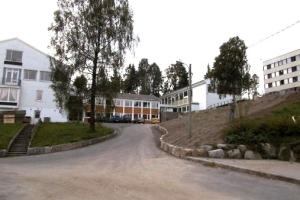
Blakstad school

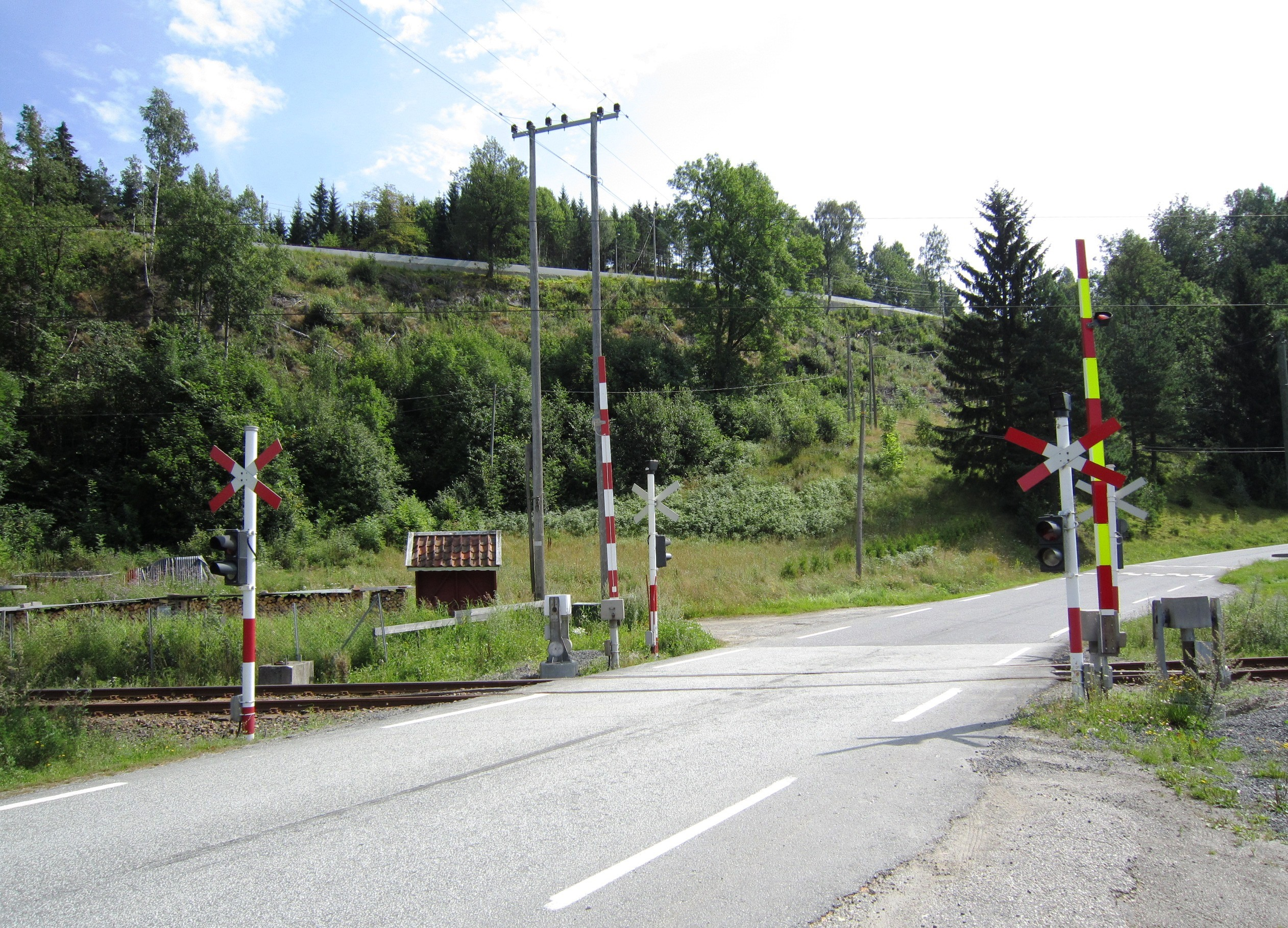
Railroad crossing on FV 408

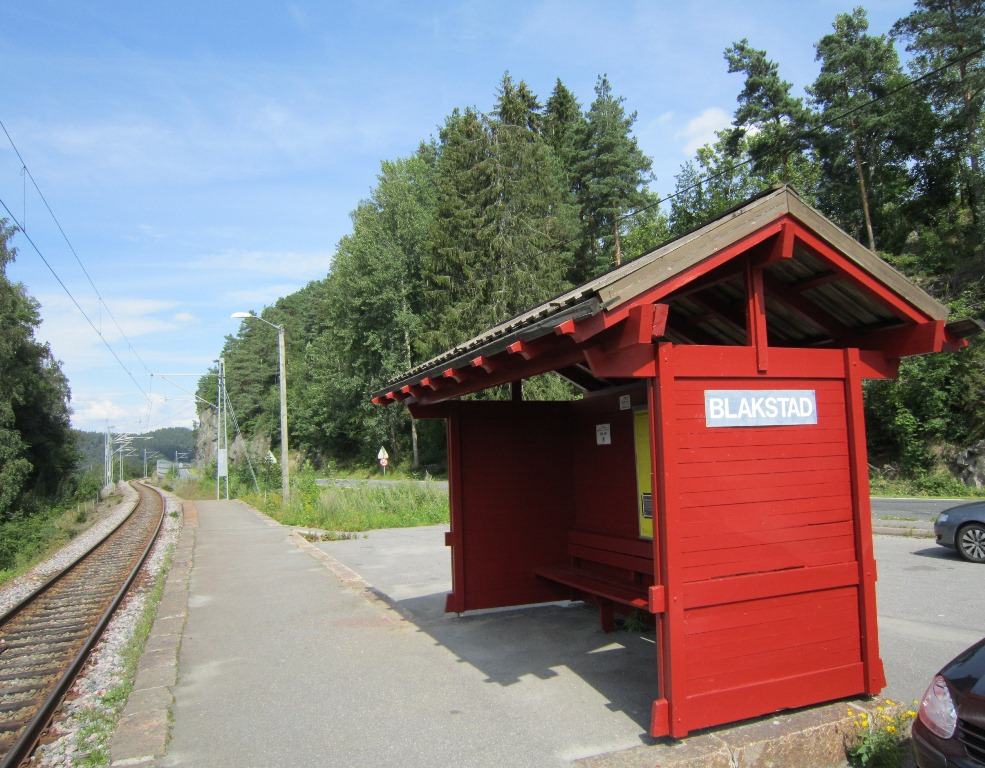
Blakstad railway station
