= Østre Agder =

Østre Agder Region Østre Agder regionen
- Metropolitan Region (Metro)
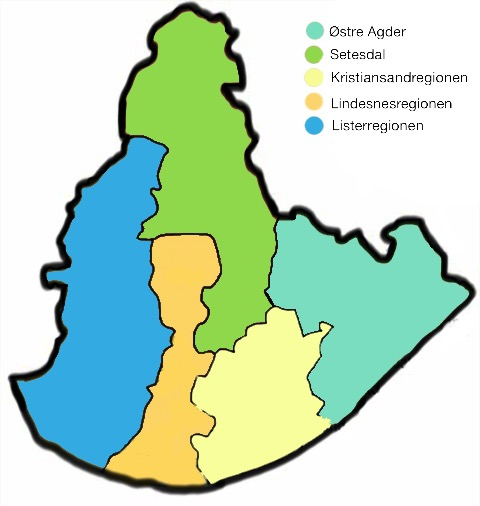
- Agder county: Østre Agder Region in teal
- Coordinates: 58.8°N 8.8°E
- Country: Norway
- County (fylke): Agder
- Urban centre: Arendal

Area
  - Total: 3,435 km^{2} (1,326 sq mi)

Population (2026)
  - Total: 95,891
  - Density: 27.92/km^{2} (72.30/sq mi)

Østre Agder is a district or region in Agder county in southern Norway. The district covers the eastern, coastal areas of the county including the eight municipalities of Arendal, Froland, Gjerstad, Grimstad, Risør, Tvedestrand, Vegårshei, Åmli. The city of Arendal is the largest city in the region. Other cities in the district include Tvedestrand, Grimstad, and Risør. This region is bounded by Telemark County to the north, by the Setesdal region to the northwest, and by the Kristiansand Region to the southwest.

Østre Agder has about 96,000 residents in its 3,435-square-kilometre (1,326 sq mi) area. The district includes all of the Church of Norway deaneries of Aust-Nedenes prosti (Gjerstad, Vegårshei, Åmli, Tvedestrand, and Risør) and Arendal prosti (Arendal and Froland) as well as a part of the Vest-Nedenes prosti (Grimstad).

== Municipalities ==
The Østre Agder Region includes the following municipalities:

Name	Map	Coat of arms	Admin. center	Population (in 2026)	Area km^{2}	Language	Location
Risør Municipality			Risør	6,683	183.66	Neutral	Coast
Grimstad Municipality			Grimstad	25,569	303.58	Bokmål	Coast
Arendal Municipality			Arendal	46,603	270.2	Bokmål	Coast
Gjerstad Municipality			Gjerstad	2,502	322.13	Neutral	Inland
Vegårshei Municipality			Myra	2,253	355.65	Neutral	Inland
Tvedestrand Municipality			Tvedestrand	6,430	224.35	Bokmål	Coast
Froland Municipality			Blakstad	6,299	644.54	Neutral	Inland
Åmli Municipality			Åmli	1,805	1,130.6	Nynorsk	Inland
