= Herefoss (disambiguation) =

Herefoss may refer to:

== Places ==
- Herefoss, a village in Birkenes Municipality in Agder county, Norway
- Herefoss Municipality, a former municipality in the old Aust-Agder county, Norway
- Herefoss Church, a church in Birkenes Municipality in Agder county, Norway
- Herefoss Station, a former station along the Sørlandsbanen railway line in Birkenes Municipality in Agder county, Norway
- Søre Herefoss (lit. 'south Herefoss'), a village in Birkenes Municipality in Agder county, Norway

== See also ==
- Herefossfjorden, a lake in Birkenes Municipality in Agder county, Norway
