= Senumstad =

Village in Birkenes Municipality, Norway

Senumstad Sennumstad
- Village
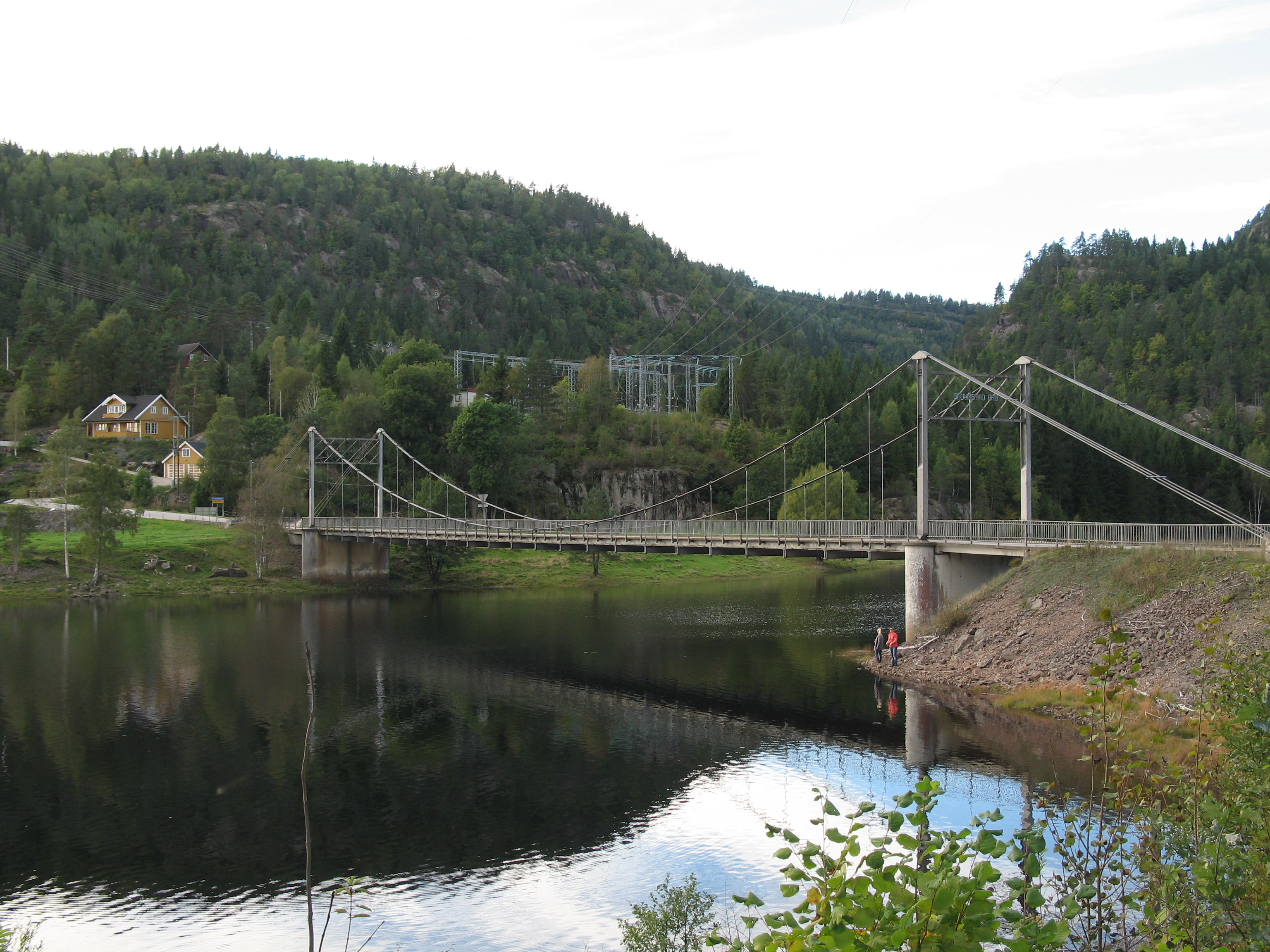
- View of the nearby Senumstad bridge
- Interactive map of Senumstad
- Coordinates: 58.4165°N 08.2864°E
- Country: Norway
- Region: Southern Norway
- County: Agder
- Municipality: Birkenes Municipality
- Elevation: 71 m (233 ft)
- Time zone: UTC+01:00 (CET)
  - Summer (DST): UTC+02:00 (CEST)
- Post Code: 4760 Birkeland

Senumstad is a village in Birkenes Municipality in Agder county, Norway, on the western shore of the river Tovdalselva, at the junction of the Norwegian National Road 41 and the Norwegian County Road 406. The Senumstad Bridge crosses the river here. The village of Væting is about 5 kilometres (3.1 mi) to the northwest, the village of Søre Herefoss is about 5 kilometres (3.1 mi) northward, and the village of Birkeland is about 10 kilometres (6.2 mi) to the south.
