= Nystølfjorden =

Lake in Agder, Norway

- Location: Birkenes and Froland, Agder
- Coordinates: 58.63233°N 8.17809°E
- Primary inflows: Mjåvassfjorden
- Primary outflows: Vågsdalsfjorden
- Basin countries: Norway
- Max. length: 7 kilometres (4.3 mi)
- Max. width: 500 metres (1,600 ft)
- Surface area: 2.41 km^{2} (0.93 sq mi)
- Shore length^{1}: 26 kilometres (16 mi)
- Surface elevation: 161 metres (528 ft)
- References: NVE

Location
- Interactive map of Nystølfjorden
- ^{1} Shore length is not a well-defined measure.

Nystølfjorden is a lake in Agder county, Norway. The 2.41-square-kilometre (0.93 sq mi) is located on the border of Birkenes Municipality and Froland Municipality. The lake is part of the Tovdalselva river drainage basin. It flows into the Vågsdalsfjorden and eventually the Uldalsåna before emptying into the Herefossfjorden.

== See also ==
- List of lakes in Aust-Agder
- List of lakes in Norway
