= Håbbesland =

Village in Birkenes Municipality, Norway

Håbbesland Håbesland
- Village
- Interactive map of Håbbesland
- Coordinates: 58.3429°N 08.2745°E
- Country: Norway
- Region: Southern Norway
- County: Agder
- Municipality: Birkenes Municipality
- Elevation: 169 m (554 ft)
- Time zone: UTC+01:00 (CET)
  - Summer (DST): UTC+02:00 (CEST)
- Post Code: 4760 Birkeland

Håbbesland is a village in Birkenes Municipality in Agder county, Norway. The village is located about 5 kilometres (3.1 mi) to the northeast of the village of Birkeland.
