= Norwegian County Road 404 =

Road in Agder county, Norway

Coordinates: 58.4595°N 08.3350°E

County Road 404
- Bokmål: Fylkesvei 404; Nynorsk: Fylkesveg 404

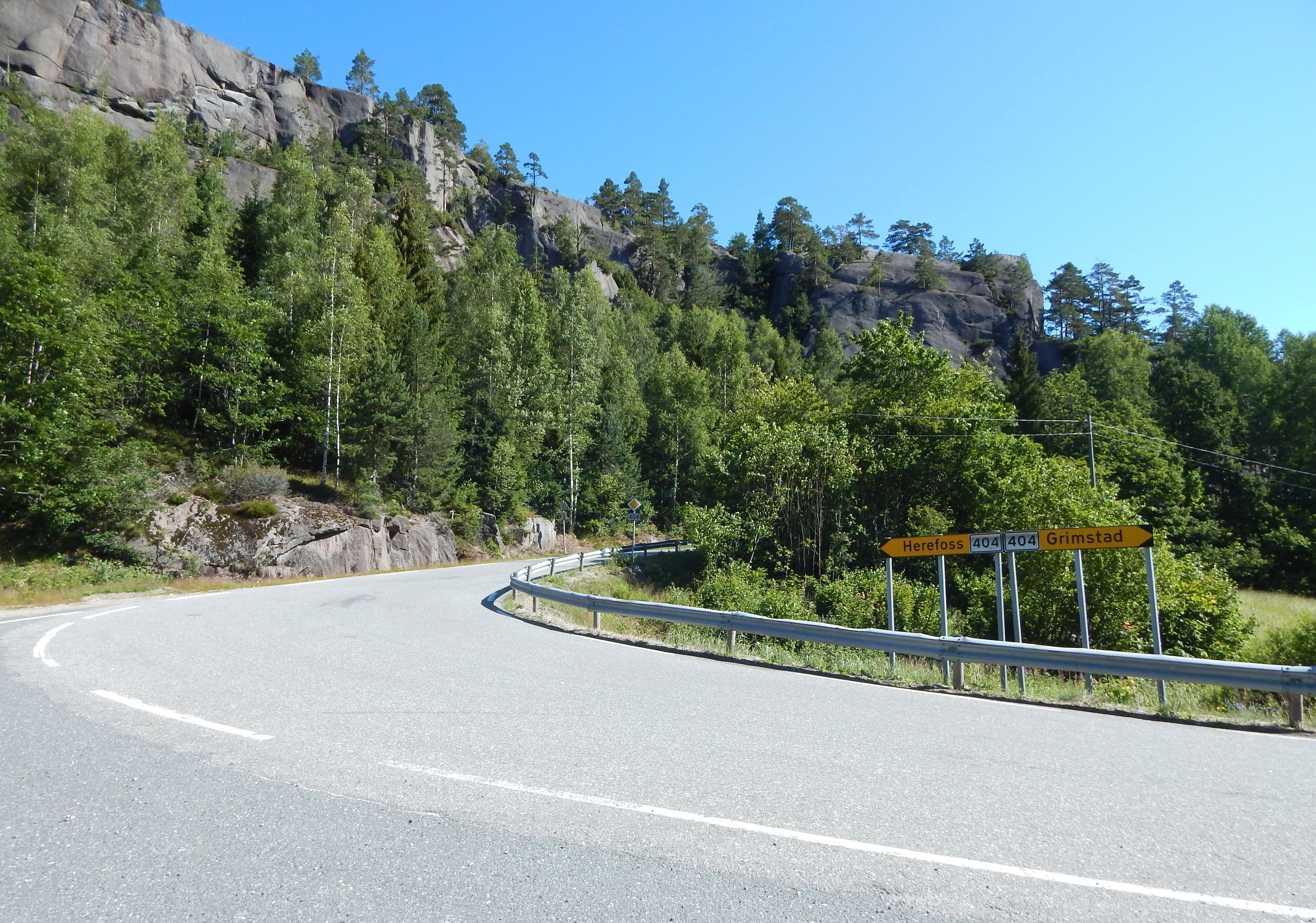
- View of the road at Grøsle in Grimstad

Route information
- Maintained by Norwegian Public Roads Administration
- Length: 27.8 km (17.3 mi)

Major junctions
- Northwest end: Søre Herefoss, Birkenes Municipality
- Rv41 at Søre Herefoss E18 at Frivoll
- Southeast end: Frivoll, Grimstad Municipality

Location
- Country: Norway

Highway system
- Roads in Norway; National Roads; County Roads
← Fv403	→ Fv405

Norwegian County Road 404 (Fv 404) is a Norwegian county road in Agder county, Norway. The 27.83-kilometre (17.29 mi) long road runs between the village of Frivoll in Grimstad Municipality in the southeast and the village of Søre Herefoss in Birkenes Municipality at the south end of the Herefossfjorden. The road connects to the Norwegian National Road 41 at Søre Herefoss and it connects to the European route E18 highway at Frivoll. The road passes between the two lakes Syndle and Rore in rural Grimstad, just northeast of the village of Roresand. Prior to a 2010 government reform, the road was classified as a Norwegian national road.
