= Flakk =

Village in Birkenes Municipality, Norway

- Village
- Interactive map of Flakk
- Coordinates: 58.3334°N 08.2063°E
- Country: Norway
- Region: Southern Norway
- County: Agder
- Municipality: Birkenes Municipality
- Elevation: 27 m (89 ft)
- Time zone: UTC+01:00 (CET)
  - Summer (DST): UTC+02:00 (CEST)
- Post Code: 4760 Birkeland

Flakk is a village in Birkenes Municipality in Agder county, Norway. The village is located on the western shore of the river Tovdalselva, across the river from the village of Birkeland which is the municipal centre of the municipality. The lake Flakksvannet lies just south of the village.
