= Herefoss Municipality =

Former municipality in Aust-Agder, Norway

Herefoss Municipality Herefoss herad
- Former municipality
- Hegrefoss herred (historic name)
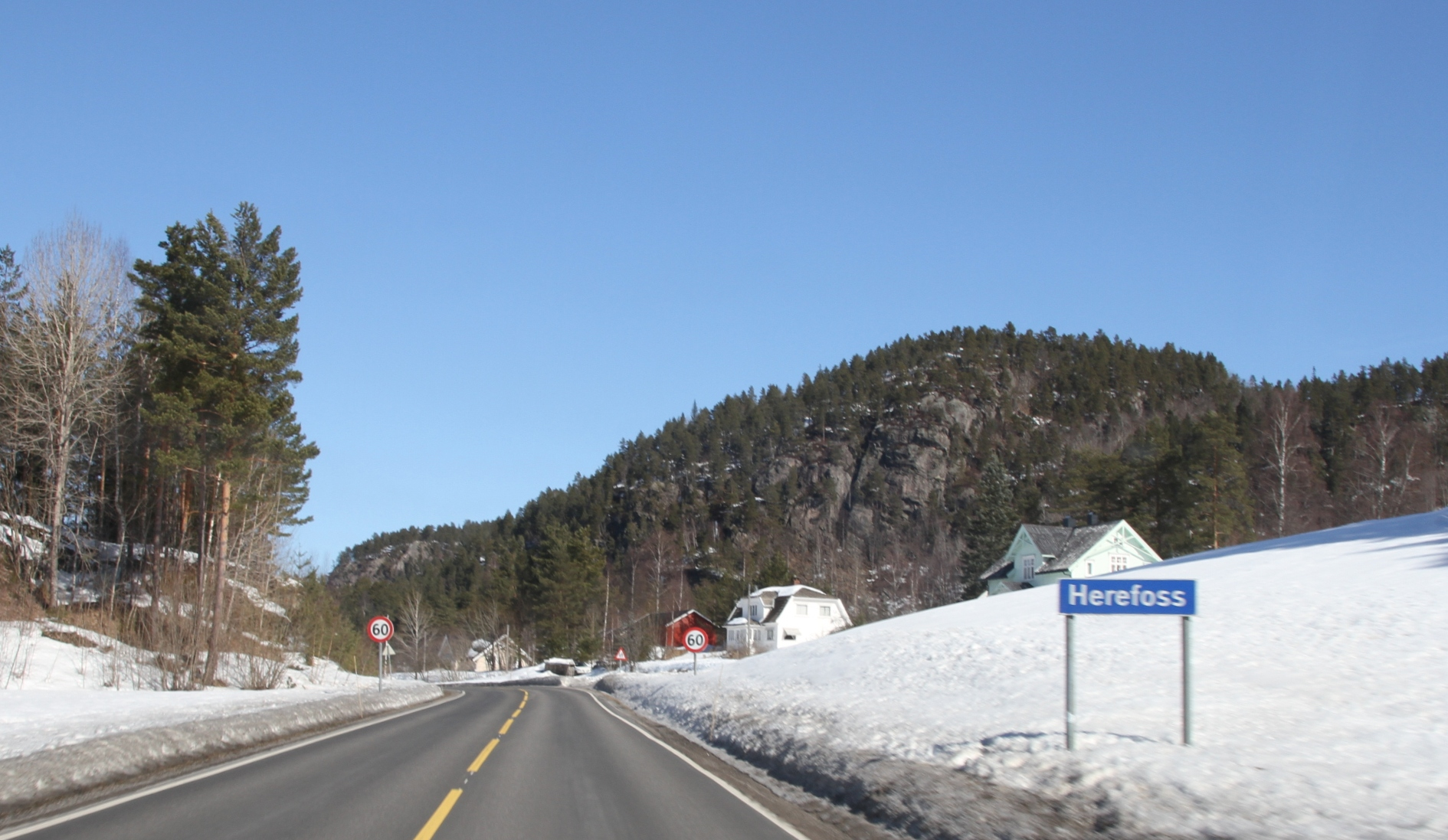
- View of the village of Herefoss

- Aust-Agder within Norway

- Herefoss within Aust-Agder
- Coordinates: 58.5243°N 08.3511°E
- Country: Norway
- County: Aust-Agder
- Established: 1 Jan 1838
  - Created as: Formannskapsdistrikt
- Disestablished: 1 Jan 1967
  - Succeeded by: Birkenes Municipality
- Administrative centre: Herefoss

Government
  - Mayor (1945–1966): Andreas Holm (Sp)

Area (upon dissolution)
  - Total: 148.2 km^{2} (57.2 sq mi)
  - Rank: #356 in Norway
- Highest elevation: 429 m (1,407 ft)

Population (1966)
  - Total: 605
  - Rank: #454 in Norway
  - Density: 4.1/km^{2} (11/sq mi)
  - Change (10 years): ▲ +0.8%
- Demonym: Herefossing

Official language
  - Norwegian form: Nynorsk
- Time zone: UTC+01:00 (CET)
  - Summer (DST): UTC+02:00 (CEST)
- ISO 3166 code: NO-0933

Herefoss is a former municipality in the old Aust-Agder county, Norway. The 148.2-square-kilometre (57.2 sq mi) municipality existed from 1838 until its dissolution in 1967. The area is now part of Birkenes Municipality in Agder county. The administrative centre was the village of Herefoss where the Herefoss Church is located. The other main village was Søre Herefoss, located in the southern part of the municipality.

Prior to its dissolution in 1967, the 148.2-square-kilometre (57.2 sq mi) municipality was the 356th largest by area out of the 460 municipalities in Norway. Herefoss Municipality was the 454th most populous municipality in Norway with a population of about 605. The municipality's population density was 4.1 inhabitants per square kilometre (11/sq mi) and its population had increased by 0.8% over the previous 10-year period.

== General information ==
The parish of Hegrefoss (later spelled Herefoss) was established as a municipality on 1 January 1838 (see formannskapsdistrikt law).

During the 1960s, there were many municipal mergers across Norway due to the work of the Schei Committee. On 1 January 1967, Herefoss Municipality was dissolved and the following areas were merged to form an enlarged Birkenes Municipality:

- all of Herefoss Municipality (population: 585)
- all of Birkenes Municipality (population: 1,883)
- all of Vegusdal Municipality (population: 582)

=== Name ===
The municipality (originally the parish) is named after the old Herefoss farm (Old Norse: Hegrafors) since the first Herefoss Church was built there. The first element is the name of the local river, Hegra. This name is derived from the word hegri which means "heron", likely the grey heron which inhabits the area. The last element is fors which means "waterfall".

Historically, the name of the municipality was spelled Hegrefoss. On 3 November 1917, a royal resolution changed the spelling of the name of the municipality to Herefoss.

=== Churches ===
The Church of Norway had one parish (sokn) within Herefoss Municipality. At the time of the municipal dissolution, it was part of the Herefoss prestegjeld and the Vest-Nedenes prosti (deanery) in the Diocese of Agder.

Churches in Herefoss Municipality
| Parish (sokn) | Church name | Location of the church | Year built |
|---|---|---|---|
| Herefoss | Herefoss Church | Herefoss | 1865 |

== Geography ==
The municipality surrounded the Herefossfjorden (part of the river Tovdalselva). The highest point in the municipality was the 429-metre (1,407 ft) tall mountain Håstølknuten, located on the western border with Vegusdal Municipality. Mykland Municipality was located to the north, Froland Municipality and Øyestad Municipality was located to the east, Landvik Municipality was located to the southeast, Birkenes Municipality was located to the south, and Vegusdal Municipality was located to the west.

== History ==
The area of Herefoss Municipality was historically the seat of public officials in this region. The fogd resided here from 1680 to 1820, and the sorenskriver (district judge) also lived here from 1724 to 1852. Herefoss was established as a prestegjeld in 1875. Herefoss Church was consecrated by Bishop Jacob von der Lippe in 1865. In 1900, 610 people lived in the municipality on 67 different farms.

== Government ==
While it existed, Vegusdal Municipality was responsible for primary education (through 10th grade), outpatient health services, senior citizen services, welfare and other social services, zoning, economic development, and municipal roads and utilities. The municipality was governed by a municipal council of directly elected representatives. The mayor was indirectly elected by a vote of the municipal council. The municipality was under the jurisdiction of the Nedenes District Court and the Agder Court of Appeal.

=== Municipal council ===
The municipal council (heradstyre) of Herefoss Municipality was made up of 13 representatives that were elected to four-year terms. The tables below show the historical composition of the council by political party.

Herefoss heradsstyre 1963–1967
| Party name (in Nynorsk) | Number of representatives |
|---|---|
| Labour Party (Arbeidarpartiet) | 6 |
| Christian Democratic Party (Kristeleg Folkeparti) | 2 |
| Centre Party (Senterpartiet) | 4 |
| Liberal Party (Venstre) | 1 |
| Total number of members: | 13 |
Note: On 1 January 1964, Herefoss Municipality became part of Birkenes Municipality.

Herefoss heradsstyre 1959–1963
| Party name (in Nynorsk) | Number of representatives |
|---|---|
| Labour Party (Arbeidarpartiet) | 6 |
| Christian Democratic Party (Kristeleg Folkeparti) | 3 |
| Centre Party (Senterpartiet) | 4 |
| Total number of members: | 13 |

Herefoss heradsstyre 1955–1959
| Party name (in Nynorsk) | Number of representatives |
|---|---|
| Labour Party (Arbeidarpartiet) | 5 |
| Christian Democratic Party (Kristeleg Folkeparti) | 4 |
| Farmers' Party (Bondepartiet) | 4 |
| Total number of members: | 13 |

Herefoss heradsstyre 1951–1955
| Party name (in Nynorsk) | Number of representatives |
|---|---|
| Labour Party (Arbeidarpartiet) | 5 |
| Christian Democratic Party (Kristeleg Folkeparti) | 2 |
| Farmers' Party (Bondepartiet) | 5 |
| Total number of members: | 12 |

Herefoss heradsstyre 1947–1951
| Party name (in Nynorsk) | Number of representatives |
|---|---|
| Labour Party (Arbeidarpartiet) | 5 |
| Christian Democratic Party (Kristeleg Folkeparti) | 3 |
| Farmers' Party (Bondepartiet) | 4 |
| Total number of members: | 12 |

Herefoss heradsstyre 1945–1947
| Party name (in Nynorsk) | Number of representatives |
|---|---|
| Labour Party (Arbeidarpartiet) | 6 |
| Farmers' Party (Bondepartiet) | 4 |
| Joint list of the Liberal Party (Venstre) and the Radical People's Party (Radikale Folkepartiet) | 2 |
| Total number of members: | 12 |

Herefoss heradsstyre 1937–1941*
| Party name (in Nynorsk) | Number of representatives |
|---|---|
| Labour Party (Arbeidarpartiet) | 5 |
| Farmers' Party (Bondepartiet) | 4 |
| Liberal Party (Venstre) | 3 |
| Total number of members: | 12 |
Note: Due to the German occupation of Norway during World War II, no elections were held for new municipal councils until after the war ended in 1945.

=== Mayors ===
The mayor (Nynorsk: ordførar) of Herefoss Municipality was the political leader of the municipality and the chairperson of the municipal council. The following people have held this position:

- 1838–1839: Knud Torjussen Aamblie
- 1840–1841: Knud Madsen Aamlie
- 1842–1845: Jørgen Huskuldsen Kylland
- 1846–1847: Ole Halvorsen Bjorvatten
- 1848–1851: Daniel Halvorsen Kylland
- 1852–1855: Kristen K. Trantelien
- 1856–1857: Torjus Knudsen Omblie
- 1858–1885: Andreas Holm
- 1886–1913: Knud Torjussen Aamlid
- 1914–1922: Kristian Andreas Holm
- 1923–1928: Karl Knutsen (V)
- 1929–1934: Eirik Nesbu (Bp)
- 1935–1937: Knut H. Suggelia (Ap)
- 1938–1943: Andreas Holm (Bp)
- 1943–1944: Nils Helleland (NS)
- 1945–1966: Andreas Holm (Sp)

== See also ==
- List of former municipalities of Norway
