= Væting =

Village in Birkenes Municipality, Norway

Væting Væling (historic)
- Village
- Interactive map of Væting
- Coordinates: 58.4590°N 08.2658°E
- Country: Norway
- Region: Southern Norway
- County: Agder
- Municipality: Birkenes Municipality
- Elevation: 202 m (663 ft)
- Time zone: UTC+01:00 (CET)
  - Summer (DST): UTC+02:00 (CEST)
- Post Code: 4760 Birkeland

Væting is a village in Birkenes Municipality in Agder county, Norway. The village is located just off the Norwegian County Road 406, about 5 kilometres (3.1 mi) northwest of the village of Senumstad.
