= Herefoss =

Village in Birkenes Municipality, Norway

- Village
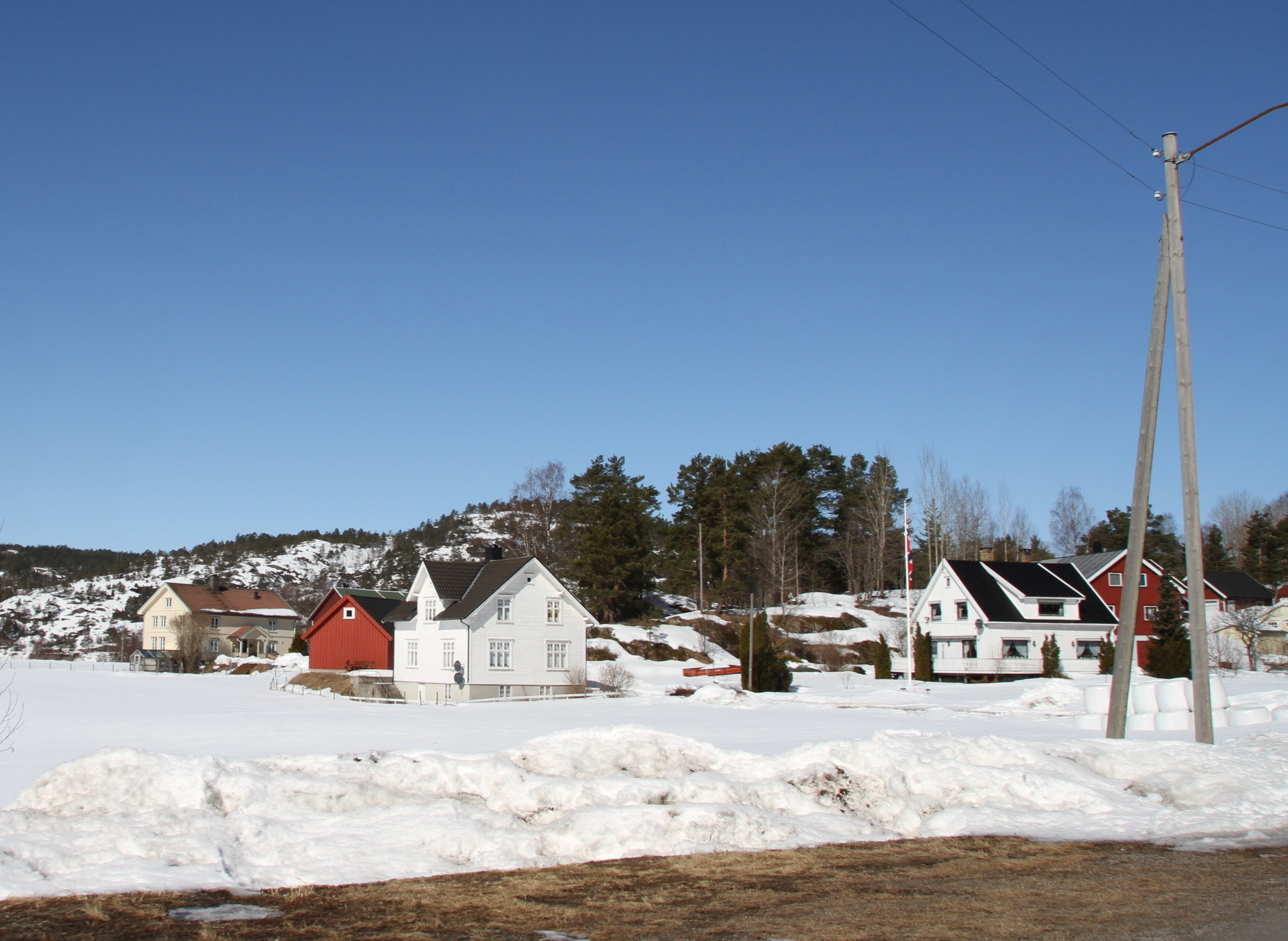
- View of the village area
- Interactive map of Herefoss
- Coordinates: 58.5243°N 08.3511°E
- Country: Norway
- Region: Southern Norway
- County: Agder
- Municipality: Birkenes Municipality
- Elevation: 80 m (260 ft)
- Time zone: UTC+01:00 (CET)
  - Summer (DST): UTC+02:00 (CEST)
- Post Code: 4766 Herefoss

Herefoss is a village in Birkenes Municipality in Agder county, Norway. The village is located on the northeastern end of the Herefossfjorden which is a large lake on the river Tovdalselva. The Norwegian National Road 41 runs through the village connecting it to the village of Søre Herefoss, about 8 kilometres (5.0 mi) to the south, and to the village of Hynnekleiv in Froland Municipality, about 10 kilometres (6.2 mi) to the north. The lake Uldalsåna lies about 2 kilometres (1.2 mi) to the northwest. Herefoss Church is located in the village.

== History ==
Herefoss was historically the seat of public officials in this region. The fogd (bailiff) resided here from 1680 to 1820, and the sorenskriver (district judge) also lived here from 1724 to 1852. Herefoss was established as a prestegjeld in 1875. Herefoss Church was consecrated by Bishop Jacob von der Lippe in 1865.

Herefoss used to have a train station along the Sørlandsbanen railway line. The station was opened on 22 June 1938, but the use was discontinued in 1989. The station building is still standing. The village was the administrative centre of the old Herefoss Municipality which existed from 1838 until 1967 when it was merged into Birkenes Municipality.

=== Name ===
The first documented occurrence of the name Hegrafoss stems from 1487, and the Old Norse form of the name must then have been Hegrafors. The first element is the genitive case of the bird name hegri (grey heron; the same as the local river name, Hegra), and the last element is fors which means 'waterfall'. Later, it was spelled Heirefos and ultimately Herefoss.

== Notable people ==
- Øyvind Bjorvatn, a local politician
- Nils Pedersen Igland, a local politician
