= Uldalsåna =

Lake in Agder, Norway

- Hanefoss reservoir
- Location: Birkenes and Froland, Agder
- Coordinates: 58.54543°N 8.29517°E
- Primary inflows: Rettåna and Skjeggedalsåna
- Primary outflows: Herefossfjorden
- Basin countries: Norway
- Max. length: 4 kilometres (2.5 mi)
- Max. width: 750 metres (2,460 ft)
- Surface area: 3 km^{2} (1.2 sq mi)
- Shore length^{1}: 34.34 kilometres (21.34 mi)
- Surface elevation: 149 metres (489 ft)
- References: NVE

Location
- Interactive map of Uldalsåna
- ^{1} Shore length is not a well-defined measure.

Uldalsåna is a lake in Agder county, Norway. The 3-square-kilometre (1.2 sq mi) lake lies on the border of Birkenes Municipality and Froland Municipality. It is part of the Tovdalselva river drainage basin. On the southeastern end of the lake, there is a hydroelectric dam which releases water into the waterfall, Hanefoss, on its way down to the lake Herefossfjorden near the village of Herefoss. The lake is fed by the rivers Rettåna and Skjeggedalsåna. The lake Nystølfjorden flows into the river Skjeggedalsåna.

== See also ==
- List of lakes in Aust-Agder
- List of lakes in Norway
