= Straumsfjorden, Agder =

Lake in Agder, Norway

Straumsfjorden
- Straumfjorden
- Interactive map of Straumsfjorden
- Location: Bygland and Valle, Agder
- Coordinates: 59.07032°N 7.7717°E
- Type: Reservoir
- Primary outflows: Hjellevatn
- Catchment area: Tovdalselva river
- Basin countries: Norway
- Max. length: 8.2 kilometres (5.1 mi)
- Max. width: 1.2 kilometres (0.75 mi)
- Surface area: 5 km^{2} (1.9 sq mi)
- Shore length^{1}: 34 kilometres (21 mi)
- Surface elevation: 757 metres (2,484 ft)
- References: NVE
- ^{1} Shore length is not a well-defined measure.

Straumsfjorden is a lake that is located along the border of Bygland Municipality and Valle Municipality in Agder county, Norway. The lake has a dam on the south end which discharges into the Hjellevatn lake and eventually travels to the lake Topsæ and the Tovdalselva river drainage basin. The lake sits in the southeastern part of Valle Municipality, about 11 kilometres (6.8 mi) southeast of the village of Rysstad and about 10 kilometres (6.2 mi) northeast of the village of Besteland.

Artifacts dating back to the Iron Age have been found along the lake.

== See also ==
- List of lakes in Aust-Agder
- List of lakes in Norway
