= Gunhild Hagestad =

Norwegian sociologist

- Born: 6 November 1942 (age 83); Birkenes Municipality, Norway
- Education: University of Minnesota
- Occupation: Sociologist

Gunhild Oline Hagestad (born 6 November 1942) is a retired Norwegian sociologist and a former assistant professor at Agder University College. Her research interests have focused on the sociology of aging.

== Personal life ==
Hagestad was born in Birkenes Municipality, Norway, on 6 November 1942, a daughter of Tønnes Hagestad and Bertha Stapnes. She was married to György Bisztray from 1966 to 1975.

== Career ==
Hagestad studied in the United States, where she graduated with a PhD from the University of Minnesota in 1975, with the thesis Middle aged women and their children. From 1975 to 1978 she was assistant professor at the University of Chicago, and from 1978 to 1987 at the Pennsylvania State University, and associate professor at the Northwestern University in Chicago. She was appointed professor at the University of Oslo in 1994, and at the Agder University College/University of Agder from 1997. She is a fellow of the Norwegian Academy of Science and Letters. She is now retired and not currently affiliated with an academic institution.

== Honours ==
Hagestad received the Matilda White Riley Award in 2013. In 2015 she was awarded the honorary prize of the Norwegian Sociological Association.

== Selected works ==
- Teachers manual for the sociological perspective. 1970. (co-author)
- Middle aged women and their children. Exploring changes in a role relationship. 1975. (thesis)
- Familiers alders- og generasjonsstruktur. 1991.
