= Hamresanden =

Beach in Agder, Norway

Hamresanden Beach
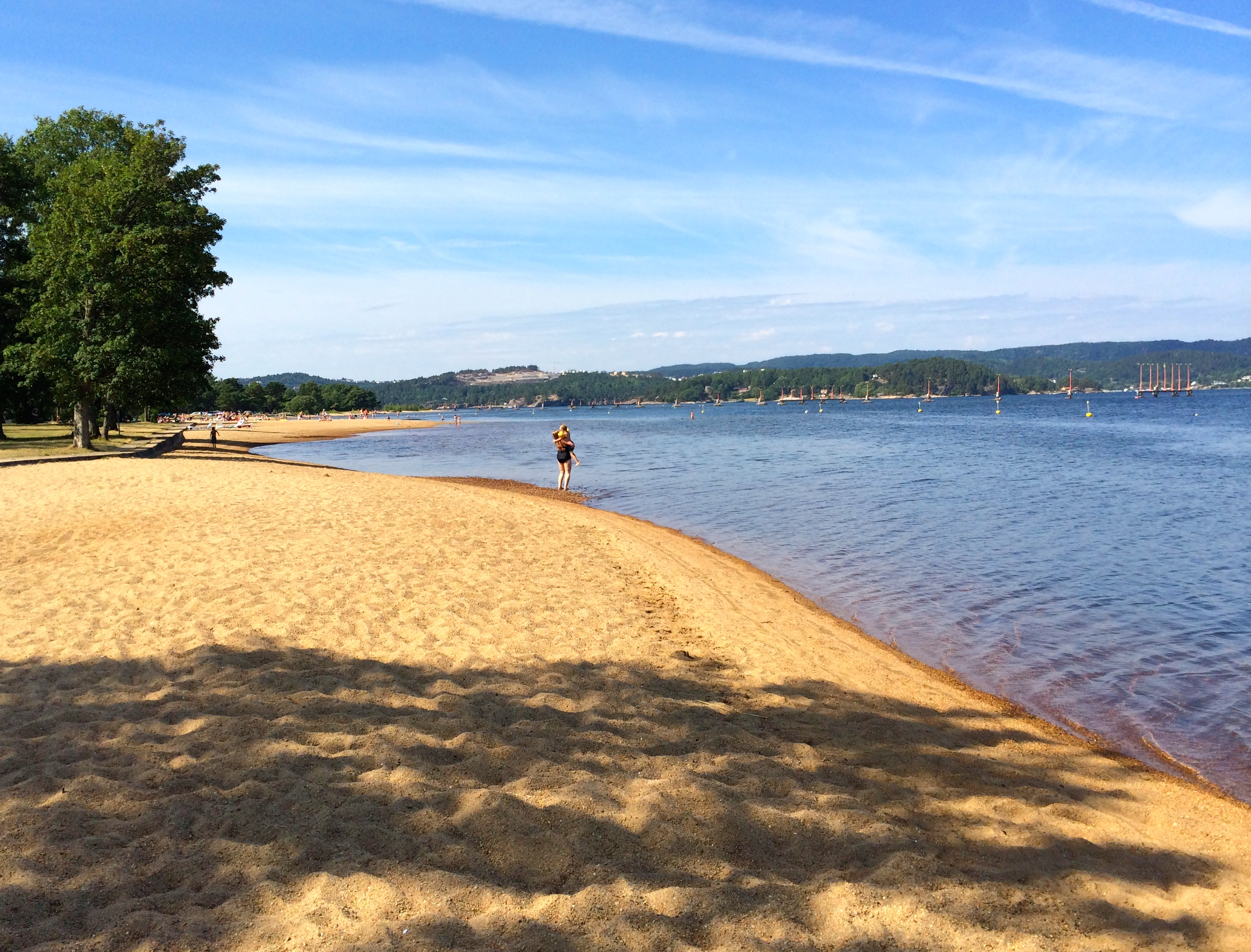
- Interactive map of Hamresanden Beach
- Location: Tveit, Kristiansand Municipality; Norway
- Nearest city: Kristiansand
- Coordinates: 58°11′28″N 8°4′34″E

Hamresanden is a 3-kilometre (1.9 mi) long beach in Kristiansand Municipality in Agder county, Norway. The sandy beach is located at Hamre in the district of Tveit, along the Topdalsfjorden at the mouth of the river Topdalselva. It is located near Kristiansand Airport, Kjevik. Hamresanden goes from Grovikheia in Hånes to Ve.

Hamresanden Camping is a family camp and waterpark located at Hamresanden. A waterpark was set to open in 2017 under the theme name "Elias" but there has been no recent news as to its construction.

Hamresanden is also a neighborhood and the centrum for the district Tveit. Hamresanden is 10 kilometres (6.2 mi) from downtown Kristiansand. The main road passing through the area is Norwegian National Road 41.

There have been archaeological excavations on Hamresanden, where ancient discoveries have been made.
