= Eppeland =

Village in Åmli Municipality, Norway

- Village
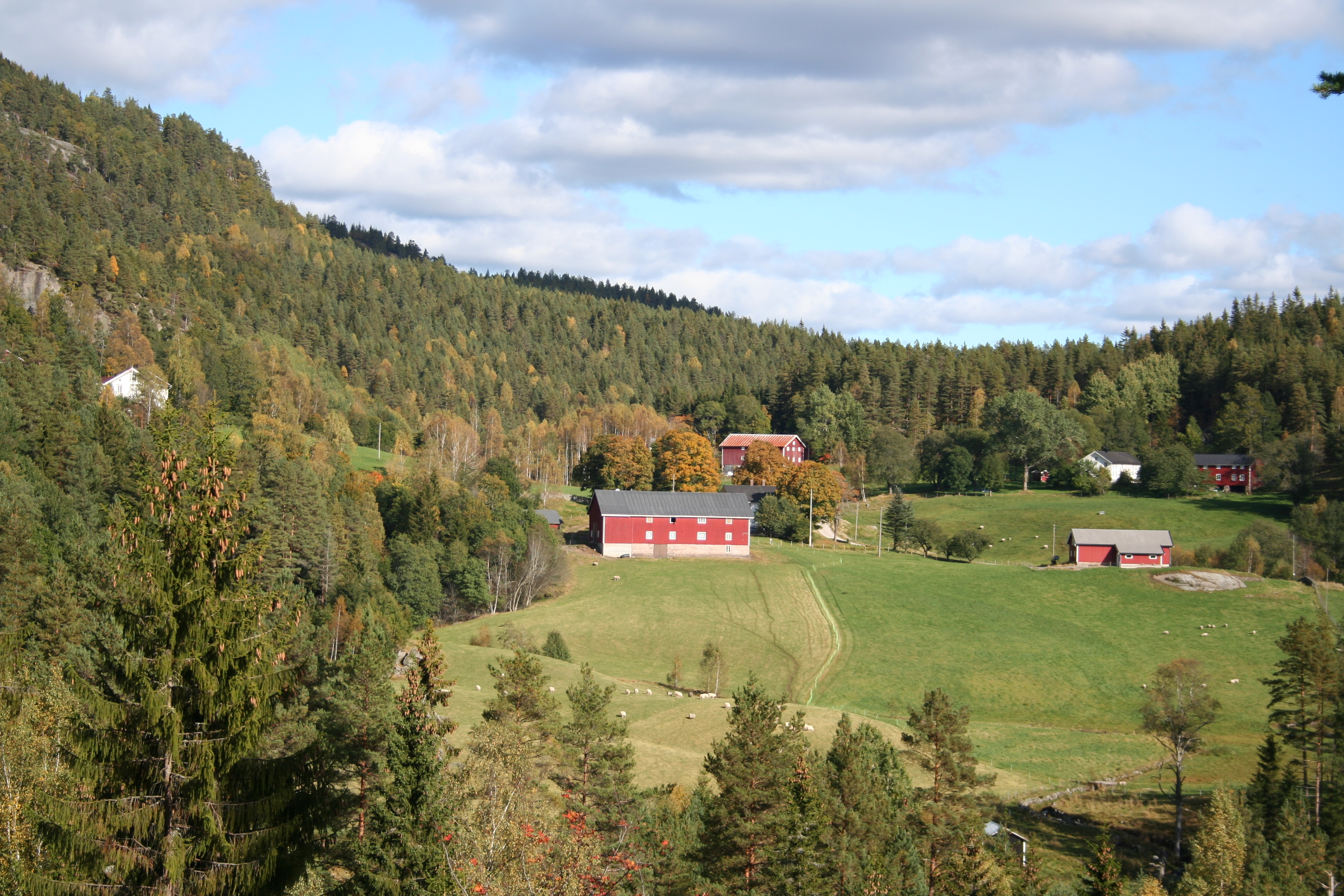
- View of the village
- Interactive map of Eppeland
- Coordinates: 58.7218°N 08.3600°E
- Country: Norway
- Region: Southern Norway
- County: Agder
- District: Østre Agder
- Municipality: Åmli Municipality
- Elevation: 224 m (735 ft)
- Time zone: UTC+01:00 (CET)
  - Summer (DST): UTC+02:00 (CEST)
- Post Code: 4869 Dølemo

Eppeland is a village in Åmli Municipality in Agder county, Norway. The village is located along the Norwegian National Road 41, about 1.5 kilometres (0.93 mi) northeast of the village of Dølemo and about 10 kilometres (6.2 mi) southwest of the municipal centre of Åmli.
