= Birkenes Municipality =

Municipality in Agder, Norway

Birkenes Municipality Birkenes kommune
- Municipality
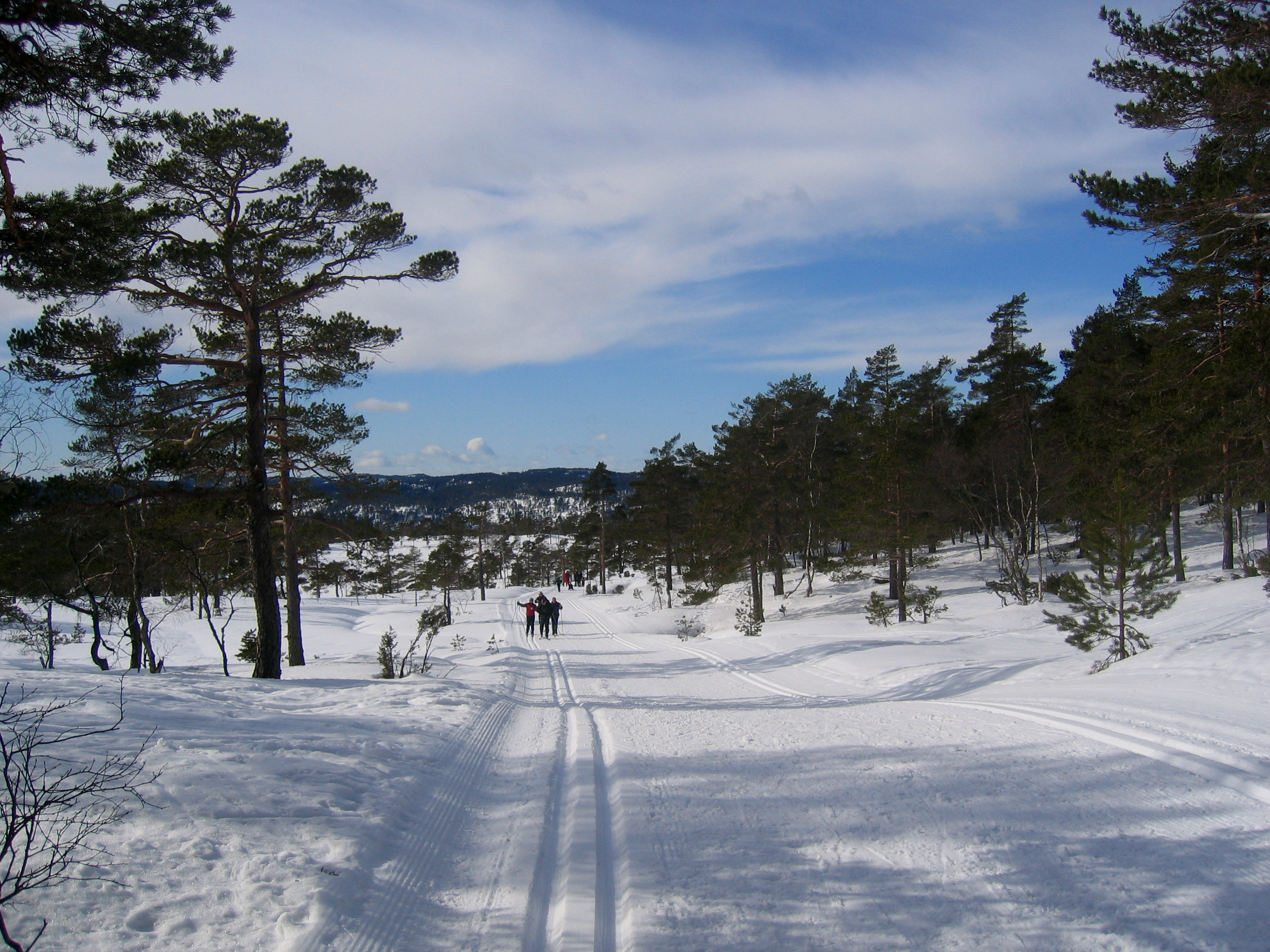
- View of the ski terrain at Topdalsheia

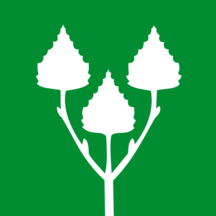
- Flag Coat of arms

- Agder within Norway

- Birkenes within Agder
- Coordinates: 58°26′58″N 08°14′00″E
- Country: Norway
- County: Agder
- District: Sørlandet
- Established: 1 Jan 1838
  - Created as: Formannskapsdistrikt
- Administrative centre: Birkeland

Government
  - Mayor (2023): Arild Windsland (H)

Area
  - Total: 637.35 km^{2} (246.08 sq mi)
  - Land: 595.99 km^{2} (230.11 sq mi)
  - Water: 41.36 km^{2} (15.97 sq mi) 6.5%
  - Rank: #183 in Norway
- Highest elevation: 531.03 m (1,742.2 ft)

Population (2026)
  - Total: 5,447
  - Rank: #179 in Norway
  - Density: 9.1/km^{2} (24/sq mi)
  - Change (10 years): ▲ +5.8%
- Demonym(s): Birkenesing; Borkis

Official language
  - Norwegian form: Neutral
- Time zone: UTC+01:00 (CET)
  - Summer (DST): UTC+02:00 (CEST)
- ISO 3166 code: NO-4216
- Website: Official website

Birkenes is a municipality in Agder county, Norway. The 637.35-square-kilometre (246.08 sq mi) municipality has existed since 1838. It is located in the traditional district of Sørlandet. The administrative centre of the municipality is the village of Birkeland, where about half the municipal population lives. Other villages in the municipality include Ås, Engesland, Flakk, Flakksvann, Håbbesland, Herefoss, Mollestad, Oggevatn, Rugsland, Senumstad, Søre Herefoss, Svaland, Tveide, Vegusdal, and Væting.

The 637.35-square-kilometre (246.08 sq mi) municipality is the 183rd largest by area out of the 357 municipalities in Norway. Birkenes Municipality is the 179th most populous municipality in Norway with a population of 5,447. The municipality's population density is 9.1 inhabitants per square kilometre (24/sq mi) and its population has increased by 5.8% over the previous 10-year period.

== General information ==
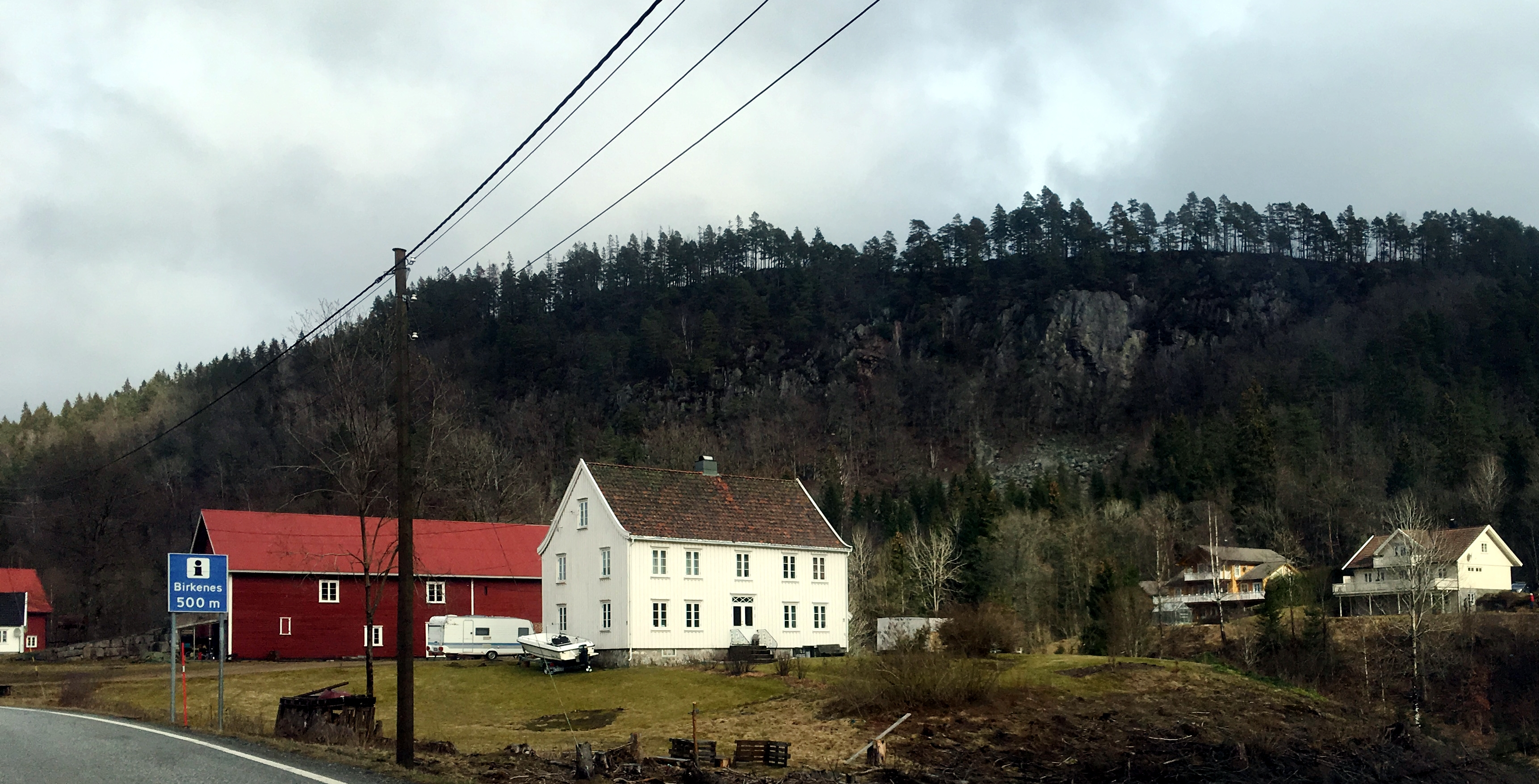
View of a farm area in Birkenes

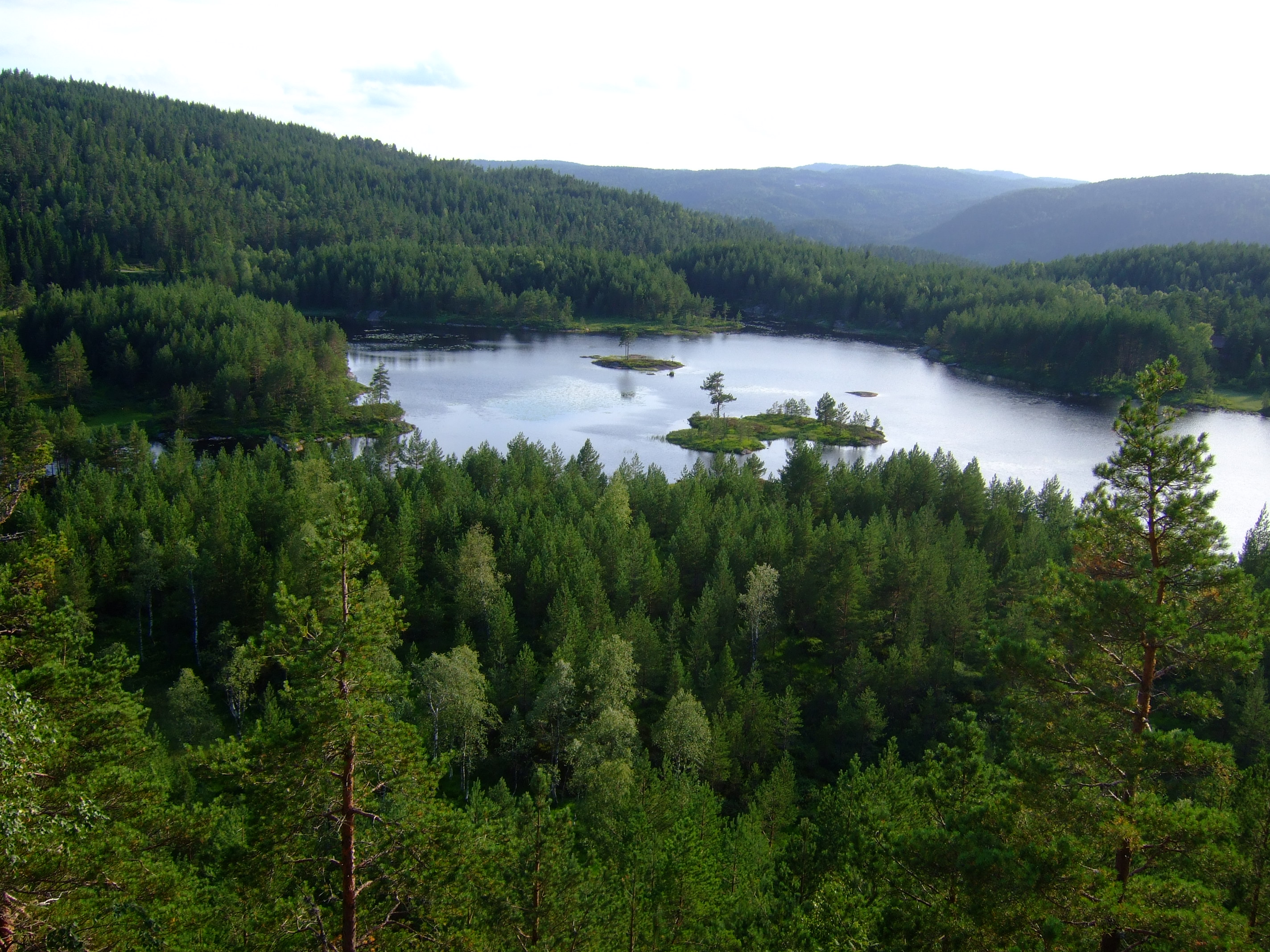
Landscape of rural Birkenes

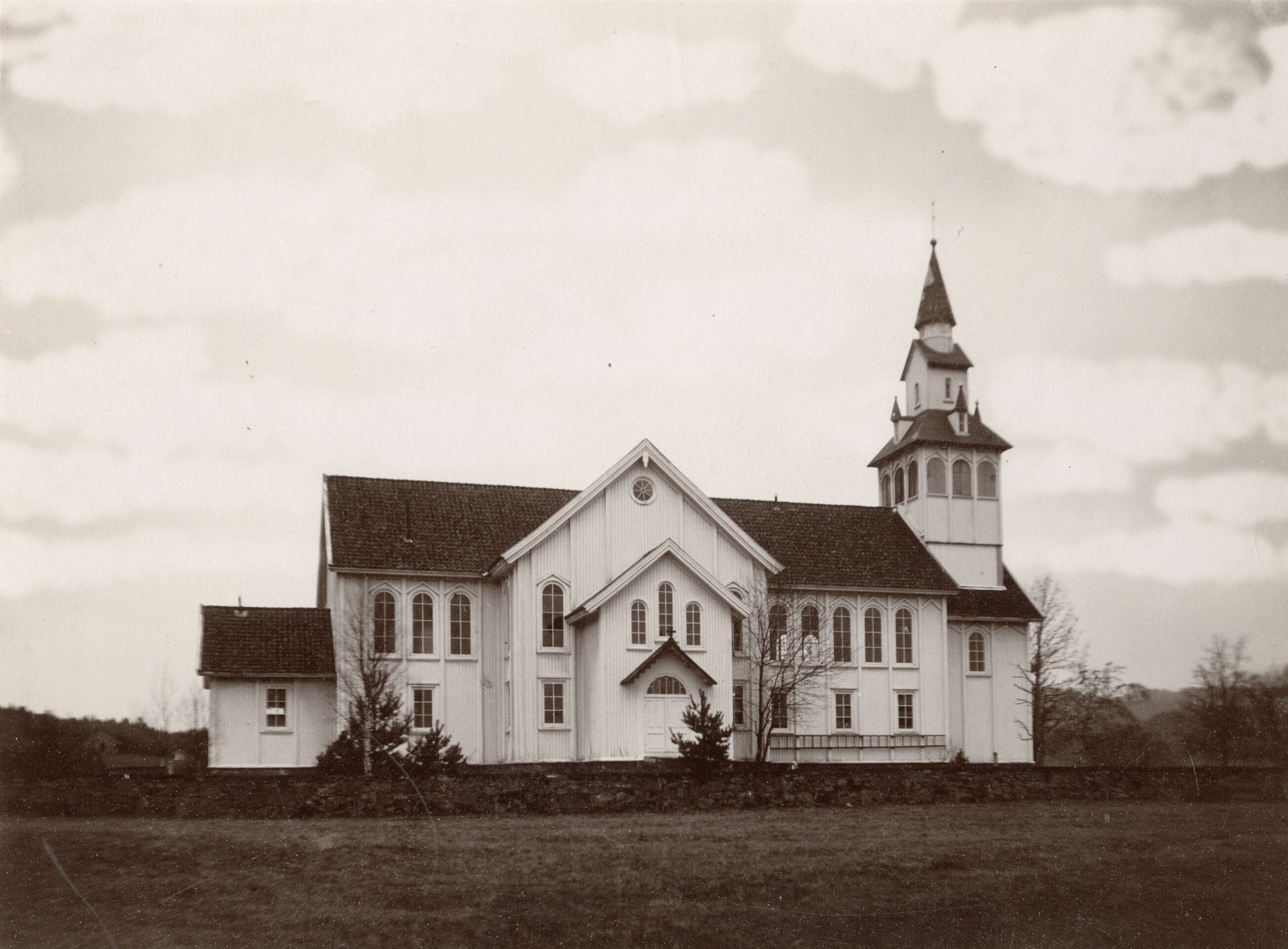
Birkenes Church, circa 1858

=== Name ===
The municipality (originally the parish) is named after the old Birkenes farm (Old Norse: Birkines) since the first Birkenes Church was built there. The first element is birki which means "birch wood". The last element is nes which means "headland". This farm is located on the south side of what is now the village of Mollestad.

=== Coat of arms ===
The coat of arms was granted on 5 December 1986. The official blazon is "Vert, a birch branch with three leaves argent issuant from the base" (Norwegian: I grønt en oppvoksende sølv bjørkekvist med tre blader). This means the arms have a green field (background) and the charge is a birch tree branch with three leaves. The branch and leaves have a tincture of argent which means it is commonly colored white, but if it is made out of metal, then silver is used. The green color in the field symbolizes the importance of agriculture in the municipality. The arms are a canting of the Norwegian word bjørk which means birch (it is canting since bjørk is similar to "birk-" in the name Birkenes). The three leaves symbolize the three main areas in the municipality: Birkenes in the south, Herefoss in the northeast, and Vegusdal in the northwest. The arms were designed by Daniel Rike who based it off an idea by Knut Øvensen. The municipal flag has the same design as the coat of arms.

=== Churches ===
The Church of Norway has three parishes (sokn) within Birkenes Municipality. It is part of the Vest-Nedenes prosti (deanery) in the Diocese of Agder og Telemark.

Churches in Birkenes Municipality
Parish (sokn)	Church name	Location of the church	Year built
Birkenes	Birkenes Church	Mollestad	1858
Herefoss	Herefoss Church	Herefoss	1865
Vegusdal	Vegusdal Church	Engesland	1867

== History ==
The parish of Birkenæs (later spelled Birkenes) was established as a municipality on 1 January 1838 (see formannskapsdistrikt law). This new municipality was historically part of the large Tveit prestegjeld, but the new formannskapsdistrikt law mandated that each prestegjeld would become its own municipality and that each municipality must exist in one county. The problem here was that the prestegjeld of Tveit belonged to the county of Lister og Mandal and the annex of Birkenæs belonged to the county of Nedenæs. Therefore, the parish was split into two with Tveit Municipality in Lister og Mandal county and Birkenæs Municipality in Nedenæs county.

On 1 January 1883, an uninhabited part of Birkenes Municipality was transferred to the control of neighboring Landvik Municipality.

During the 1960s, there were many municipal mergers across Norway due to the work of the Schei Committee. On 1 January 1967, the following areas were merged to form an enlarged Birkenes Municipality with a population of 3,050:

- all of Birkenes Municipality (population: 1,883)
- all of Herefoss Municipality (population: 585)
- all of Vegusdal Municipality (population: 582)

On 1 January 1970, the two uninhabited areas of Neset and Råbudal in the neighboring Froland Municipality were transferred to Birkenes Municipality (these areas were formerly in the municipality of Mykland Municipality prior to 1967). On 1 January 1979, the uninhabited area of Landheia in Froland Municipality was transferred to Birkenes Municipality. Later, on 1 January 1986, the Lislevand farm area (population: 8) was transferred from Birkenes Municipality to the neighboring Evje og Hornnes Municipality. Then on 1 January 1991, the Dalen area of Birkenes Municipality (population: 60) was transferred to the neighboring Froland Municipality. On 1 January 2019, the Hovlandsdalen area (population: 27) was transferred from Birkenes Municipality to the neighboring Evje og Hornnes Municipality.

== Geography ==
Birkenes is home to many lakes, including Herefossfjorden, Nystølfjorden, Ogge, and Uldalsåna. The river Tovdalselva runs through the municipality as well. The highest point in the municipality is the 531.03-metre (1,742.2 ft) tall mountain Storemyrknuten. Froland Municipality is located to the north, Grimstad Municipality is located to the east, Lillesand Municipality is located to the southeast, Kristiansand Municipality is located to the south, Vennesla Municipality is located to the southwest, Iveland Municipality is located to the west, and Evje og Hornnes Municipality is located to the northwest.

== Government ==
Birkenes Municipality is responsible for primary education (through 10th grade), outpatient health services, senior citizen services, welfare and other social services, zoning, economic development, and municipal roads and utilities. The municipality is governed by a municipal council of directly elected representatives. The mayor is indirectly elected by a vote of the municipal council. The municipality is under the jurisdiction of the Agder District Court and the Agder Court of Appeal.

=== Municipal council ===
The municipal council (Kommunestyre) of Birkenes Municipality is made up of 21 representatives that are elected to four year terms. The tables below show the current and historical composition of the council by political party.

Birkenes kommunestyre 2023–2027
Party name (in Norwegian)	Number of representatives
Labour Party (Arbeiderpartiet)	3
Progress Party (Fremskrittspartiet)	2
Conservative Party (Høyre)	6
Industry and Business Party (Industri‑ og Næringspartiet)	2
Christian Democratic Party (Kristelig Folkeparti)	3
Centre Party (Senterpartiet)	4
Socialist Left Party (Sosialistisk Venstreparti)	1
Total number of members:	21

Birkenes kommunestyre 2019–2023
Party name (in Norwegian)	Number of representatives
Labour Party (Arbeiderpartiet)	4
Progress Party (Fremskrittspartiet)	2
Conservative Party (Høyre)	5
Christian Democratic Party (Kristelig Folkeparti)	2
Centre Party (Senterpartiet)	7
Joint list of the Socialist Left Party (Sosialistisk Venstreparti) and the Green Party (Miljøpartiet De Grønne)	1
Total number of members:	21

Birkenes kommunestyre 2015–2019
Party name (in Norwegian)	Number of representatives
Labour Party (Arbeiderpartiet)	5
Progress Party (Fremskrittspartiet)	2
Conservative Party (Høyre)	5
Christian Democratic Party (Kristelig Folkeparti)	5
Centre Party (Senterpartiet)	3
Liberal Party (Venstre)	1
Total number of members:	21

Birkenes kommunestyre 2011–2015
Party name (in Norwegian)	Number of representatives
Labour Party (Arbeiderpartiet)	4
Progress Party (Fremskrittspartiet)	2
Conservative Party (Høyre)	8
Christian Democratic Party (Kristelig Folkeparti)	4
Centre Party (Senterpartiet)	2
Socialist Left Party (Sosialistisk Venstreparti)	1
Total number of members:	21

Birkenes kommunestyre 2007–2011
Party name (in Norwegian)	Number of representatives
Labour Party (Arbeiderpartiet)	5
Progress Party (Fremskrittspartiet)	4
Conservative Party (Høyre)	9
Christian Democratic Party (Kristelig Folkeparti)	5
Centre Party (Senterpartiet)	3
Socialist Left Party (Sosialistisk Venstreparti)	1
Total number of members:	27

Birkenes kommunestyre 2003–2007
Party name (in Norwegian)	Number of representatives
Labour Party (Arbeiderpartiet)	5
Progress Party (Fremskrittspartiet)	3
Conservative Party (Høyre)	8
Christian Democratic Party (Kristelig Folkeparti)	5
Centre Party (Senterpartiet)	3
Socialist Left Party (Sosialistisk Venstreparti)	2
Liberal Party (Venstre)	1
Total number of members:	27

Birkenes kommunestyre 1999–2003
Party name (in Norwegian)	Number of representatives
Labour Party (Arbeiderpartiet)	6
Progress Party (Fremskrittspartiet)	1
Conservative Party (Høyre)	8
Christian Democratic Party (Kristelig Folkeparti)	6
Centre Party (Senterpartiet)	5
Liberal Party (Venstre)	1
Total number of members:	27

Birkenes kommunestyre 1995–1999
Party name (in Norwegian)	Number of representatives
Labour Party (Arbeiderpartiet)	6
Conservative Party (Høyre)	7
Christian Democratic Party (Kristelig Folkeparti)	6
Centre Party (Senterpartiet)	7
Liberal Party (Venstre)	1
Total number of members:	27

Birkenes kommunestyre 1991–1995
Party name (in Norwegian)	Number of representatives
Labour Party (Arbeiderpartiet)	6
Progress Party (Fremskrittspartiet)	3
Conservative Party (Høyre)	6
Christian Democratic Party (Kristelig Folkeparti)	5
Centre Party (Senterpartiet)	6
Liberal Party (Venstre)	1
Total number of members:	27

Birkenes kommunestyre 1987–1991
Party name (in Norwegian)	Number of representatives
Labour Party (Arbeiderpartiet)	8
Conservative Party (Høyre)	6
Christian Democratic Party (Kristelig Folkeparti)	6
Centre Party (Senterpartiet)	5
Joint list of the Liberal Party (Venstre) and Liberal People's Party (Liberale Folkepartiet)	1
Birkenes local list (Birkenes Bygdeliste)	1
Total number of members:	27

Birkenes kommunestyre 1983–1987
Party name (in Norwegian)	Number of representatives
Labour Party (Arbeiderpartiet)	8
Progress Party (Fremskrittspartiet)	2
Conservative Party (Høyre)	4
Christian Democratic Party (Kristelig Folkeparti)	6
Liberal People's Party (Liberale Folkepartiet)	1
Centre Party (Senterpartiet)	6
Total number of members:	27

Birkenes kommunestyre 1979–1983
Party name (in Norwegian)	Number of representatives
Labour Party (Arbeiderpartiet)	8
Conservative Party (Høyre)	5
Christian Democratic Party (Kristelig Folkeparti)	6
Centre Party (Senterpartiet)	7
Joint list of the Liberal Party (Venstre) and New People's Party (Nye Folkepartiet)	1
Total number of members:	27

Birkenes kommunestyre 1975–1979
Party name (in Norwegian)	Number of representatives
Labour Party (Arbeiderpartiet)	8
Conservative Party (Høyre)	3
Christian Democratic Party (Kristelig Folkeparti)	7
New People's Party (Nye Folkepartiet)	1
Centre Party (Senterpartiet)	8
Total number of members:	27

Birkenes kommunestyre 1971–1975
Party name (in Norwegian)	Number of representatives
Labour Party (Arbeiderpartiet)	9
Conservative Party (Høyre)	2
Christian Democratic Party (Kristelig Folkeparti)	4
Centre Party (Senterpartiet)	8
Liberal Party (Venstre)	4
Total number of members:	27

Birkenes kommunestyre 1967–1971
Party name (in Norwegian)	Number of representatives
Labour Party (Arbeiderpartiet)	10
Conservative Party (Høyre)	1
Christian Democratic Party (Kristelig Folkeparti)	3
Centre Party (Senterpartiet)	8
Liberal Party (Venstre)	5
Total number of members:	27

Birkenes kommunestyre 1963–1967
Party name (in Norwegian)	Number of representatives
Labour Party (Arbeiderpartiet)	6
Christian Democratic Party (Kristelig Folkeparti)	2
Centre Party (Senterpartiet)	5
Liberal Party (Venstre)	4
Total number of members:	17

Birkenes herredsstyre 1959–1963
Party name (in Norwegian)	Number of representatives
Labour Party (Arbeiderpartiet)	6
Christian Democratic Party (Kristelig Folkeparti)	2
Centre Party (Senterpartiet)	5
Liberal Party (Venstre)	4
Total number of members:	17

Birkenes herredsstyre 1955–1959
Party name (in Norwegian)	Number of representatives
Labour Party (Arbeiderpartiet)	7
Farmers' Party (Bondepartiet)	5
Liberal Party (Venstre)	5
Total number of members:	17

Birkenes herredsstyre 1951–1955
Party name (in Norwegian)	Number of representatives
Labour Party (Arbeiderpartiet)	6
Farmers' Party (Bondepartiet)	5
Liberal Party (Venstre)	5
Total number of members:	16

Birkenes herredsstyre 1947–1951
Party name (in Norwegian)	Number of representatives
Labour Party (Arbeiderpartiet)	5
Farmers' Party (Bondepartiet)	4
Liberal Party (Venstre)	7
Total number of members:	16

Birkenes herredsstyre 1945–1947
Party name (in Norwegian)	Number of representatives
Labour Party (Arbeiderpartiet)	6
Farmers' Party (Bondepartiet)	4
Liberal Party (Venstre)	6
Total number of members:	16

Birkenes herredsstyre 1937–1941*
Party name (in Norwegian)	Number of representatives
Labour Party (Arbeiderpartiet)	5
Farmers' Party (Bondepartiet)	4
Liberal Party (Venstre)	7
Total number of members:	16
Note: Due to the German occupation of Norway during World War II, no elections were held for new municipal councils until after the war ended in 1945.

=== Mayors ===
The mayor (Norwegian: ordfører) of Birkenes Municipality is the political leader of the municipality and the chairperson of the municipal council. The following people have held this position:

- 1838–1839: Bendt Gundersen Birkeland
- 1840–1841: Carl Taraldsen Klep
- 1842–1843: Peder Osmundsen Birkeland
- 1844–1845: Bendt Gundersen Birkeland
- 1846–1847: Elias Olsen Flaa
- 1848–1851: Nils Olsen Østerhus
- 1852–1853: Knut Nilsen Haabesland
- 1854–1855: Halvor Jakobsen Tjøntvedt
- 1856–1863: Andreas Jørgensen Solberg
- 1864–1867: Halvor Jakobsen Tjøntvedt
- 1868–1869: Andreas Jørgensen Solberg
- 1870–1871: Bendix Bendtsen Birkeland
- 1872–1873: Jens Syvertsen Rugsland
- 1874–1875: Ole Mathias Olsen Birkenes
- 1876–1879: Andreas Jørgensen Solberg
- 1880–1883: Nils Olsen Røinaas
- 1884–1885: Isak Guttormsen Raen
- 1886–1887: Nils Olsen Røinaas
- 1888–1895: Tellef Osmundsen Mollestad
- 1896–1901: Andreas Røstad
- 1902–1904: Syvert A. Jamsland
- 1905–1910: Mads G. Mollestad
- 1911–1913: L.M. Tvede
- 1914–1919: Torjus Aamlid
- 1920–1925: Olav Røstad
- 1926–1928: Olaus Tvede
- 1929–1940: Johannes Røinaas (V)
- 1940–1943: Harald Unander (NS)
- 1943–1945: Olav Aakre (NS)
- 1945–1951: Johannes Røinaas (V)
- 1952–1966: Andreas Høygilt (Sp)
- 1967–1971: Andreas Holm (Sp)
- 1971–1991: Kristen K. Flaa (Sp)
- 1991–2010: Harald Vestøl (H)
- 2010–2011: Arild Espegren (KrF)
- 2011–2015: Arild Windsland (H)
- 2015–2019: Anders Christiansen (Ap)
- 2019–2023: Gyro Heia (Sp)
- 2023–present: Arild Windsland (H)

== Economy ==
Agriculture and logging are important sources of employment, but the municipality also has a small industrial base with about 400 different work sites. The largest enterprise is Owens Corning with approximately 180 employees. Other larger businesses include Uldal Vinduer og Dører, Foss Bad, Scanflex, KOAB Industrier, and Birkeland Trykkeri.

== Transportation ==
The Sørland Line provides rail service at Herefoss Station. Prior to 1953, the Lillesand-Flaksvand Line also served the municipality, but that railway line was closed down and removed.

Norwegian National Road 41 runs north–south through Birkenes, and is one of the main highways in this area of Norway. There are also several other important county roads in Birkenes, such as Norwegian County Road 404, Norwegian County Road 405, and Norwegian County Road 406.

== Notable people ==
- Kåre Kolberg (1936 in Birkenes – 2014), a composer, organist, and music critic
- Gunhild Hagestad (born 1942 in Birkenes), a retired sociologist and academic
- Gunn Margit Andreassen (born 1973), a former biathlete, team bronze medallist in the 1998 Winter Olympics, and team silver medallist at the 2002 Winter Olympics who lives in Birkenes
- Trude Harstad (born 1974 in Birkenes), a former biathlete
