= Nils Pedersen Igland =

Norwegian farmer and politician

Nils Pedersen Igland (1833–1898) was a Norwegian farmer and politician for the Conservative Party.

He was born in Herefoss Municipality. In 1856, he married Åse Terjesdatter Helleland, and the couple had three children. His wife dying in 1869, he married Ellen Marie Johannesdatter Skiftenes three years later. Elen was born in 1845. They had 11 children: Åsta Marie Nilsdatter Vormeli (Igland), Aase Nilsdatter Igland and 9 other children.

He was elected to the Norwegian Parliament in 1868, representing the constituency of Nedenæs Amt. He worked as a farmer there. He was later elected in 1871, 1877, 1889, 1892 and 1895, and represented the Conservative Party.

He died in Landvik Municipality in 1898, at the age of 65.
