= Norwegian County Road 406 =

Road in Agder county, Norway

Coordinates: 58.4174°N 08.2906°E

County Road 406
- Bokmål: Fylkesvei 406; Nynorsk: Fylkesveg 406

Route information
- Maintained by Norwegian Public Roads Administration
- Length: 18.1 km (11.2 mi)

Major junctions
- North end: Fv405 at Stemloma
- South end: Rv41 at Sennumstad

Location
- Country: Norway

Highway system
- Roads in Norway; National Roads; County Roads
← Fv405	→ Fv407

Norwegian County Road 406 (Fv 406) is a Norwegian county road in Birkenes Municipality in Agder county, Norway. The 18.1-kilometre (11.2 mi) long road runs between the village of Sennumstad on the Tovdalselva river to the village of Stemlona. The road connects to the Norwegian County Road 405 at Stemlona and it connects to the Norwegian National Road 41 at its other end at Sennumstad. The road runs through a fairly rural area in Birkenes Municipality. The Sørlandsbanen railway line crosses over the road at Fidje.
