= Norwegian County Road 405 =

Road in Agder county, Norway

Coordinates: 58.2182°N 07.9235°E

County Road 405
- Bokmål: Fylkesvei 405; Nynorsk: Fylkesveg 405

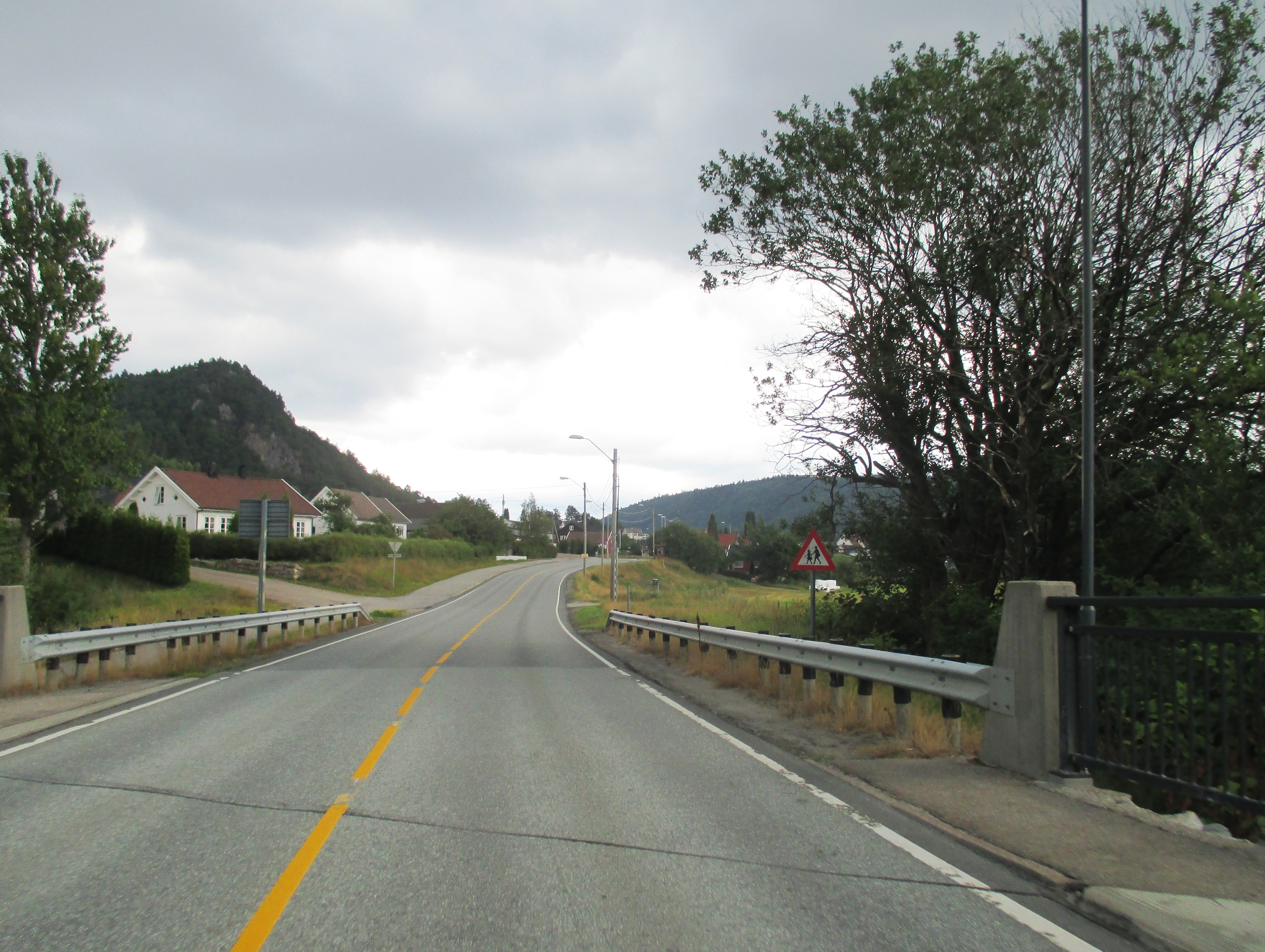
- View of the road near Mosby, Norway

Route information
- Maintained by Norwegian Public Roads Administration
- Length: 54.56 km (33.90 mi)

Major junctions
- North end: Fv406 Engesland, Birkenes Municipality
- South end: Rv9 Mosby, Kristiansand Municipality

Location
- Country: Norway

Highway system
- Roads in Norway; National Roads; County Roads
← Fv404	→ Fv406

Norwegian County Road 405 (Fv405) is a Norwegian county road in Agder county. The road runs between from the village of Engesland in Birkenes Municipality in the north to the junction with the Norwegian National Road 9 in the village of Mosby in Kristiansand Municipality in the south. The road is 54.56 kilometres (33.90 mi) long. Prior to a 2010 government reform, the road was classified as a Norwegian national road.
