= Herefoss Church =

Church in Agder, Norway

- Herefoss kirke
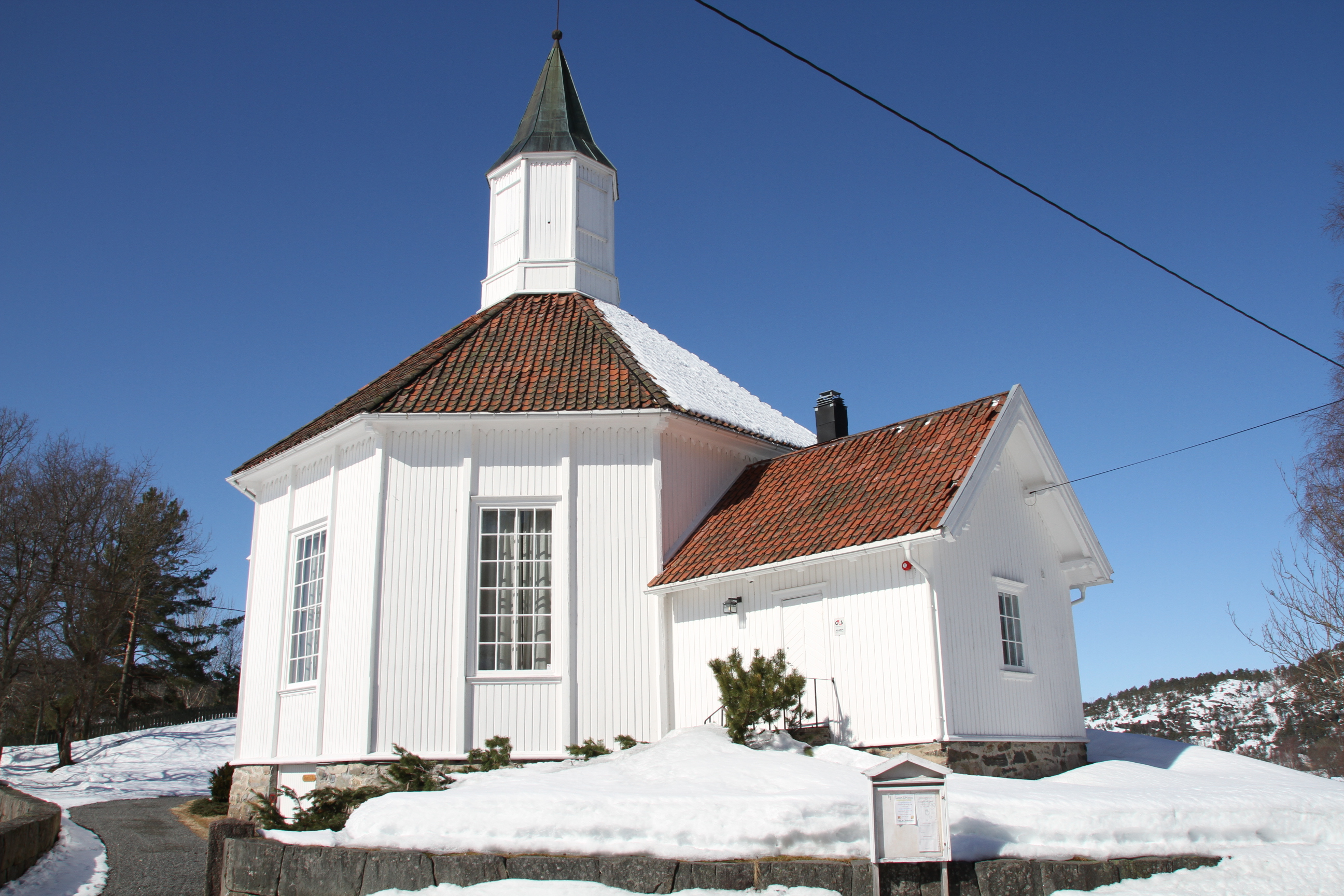
- View of the church
- Herefoss Church
- 58.523107°N 08.35014°E
- Location: Birkenes Municipality, Agder
- Country: Norway
- Denomination: Church of Norway
- Previous denomination: Catholic Church
- Churchmanship: Evangelical Lutheran

History
- Status: Parish church
- Founded: 13th century
- Consecrated: 11 Oct 1865

Architecture
- Functional status: Active
- Architect: Jacob Wilhelm Nordan
- Architectural type: Octagonal
- Completed: 1865 (161 years ago)

Specifications
- Capacity: 200
- Materials: Wood

Administration
- Diocese: Agder og Telemark
- Deanery: Vest-Nedenes prosti
- Parish: Herefoss
- Norwegian Cultural Heritage Site
- Type: Church
- Status: Listed
- ID: 84558

Herefoss Church (Norwegian: Herefoss kirke) is a parish church of the Church of Norway in Birkenes Municipality in Agder county, Norway. It is located in the village of Herefoss, at the northern end of the Herefossfjorden, just west of the Norwegian National Road 41. It is the church for the Herefoss parish which is part of the Vest-Nedenes prosti (deanery) in the Diocese of Agder og Telemark. The white, wooden church was built in a octagonal design in 1865 using plans drawn up by the architect Jacob Wilhelm Nordan. The church seats about 200 people.

== History ==
The earliest existing historical records of the church date back to the year 1487, but the church was likely founded in the 13th century. The oldest church on this site was a stave church that was probably the one that was standing in 1487. In the 1500s or 1600s, that old church was torn down and replaced with a long church made out of rough timber. Both of these churches stood about 30 metres (98 ft) north of the present church, very close to the shore of the Herefossfjorden. In 1723, the church was sold into private ownership by the King to help pay off his war debts.

In 1814, this church served as an election church (Norwegian: valgkirke). Together with more than 300 other parish churches across Norway, it was a polling station for elections to the 1814 Norwegian Constituent Assembly which wrote the Constitution of Norway. This was Norway's first national elections. Each church parish was a constituency that elected people called "electors" who later met together in each county to elect the representatives for the assembly that was to meet at Eidsvoll Manor later that year.

In 1827, the parish purchased the building from a private owner. Due to its low location along the shoreline, the church often worried about flooding along the Herefossfjorden. In 1860, during a big flood, water inundated the church causing some damage so it was decided to replace the church and move it to higher ground. In 1865, a new church was built about 30 metres (98 ft) south of the old church. The new church was built in an octagonal design and it was consecrated on 11 October 1865 by the Bishop Jacob von der Lippe. After the new church was completed, the old church was torn down. Later, about 1,200 cubic metres (42,000 cu ft) of dirt was brought in to raise the land to prevent flooding and protect the church and cemetery.

== Media gallery ==
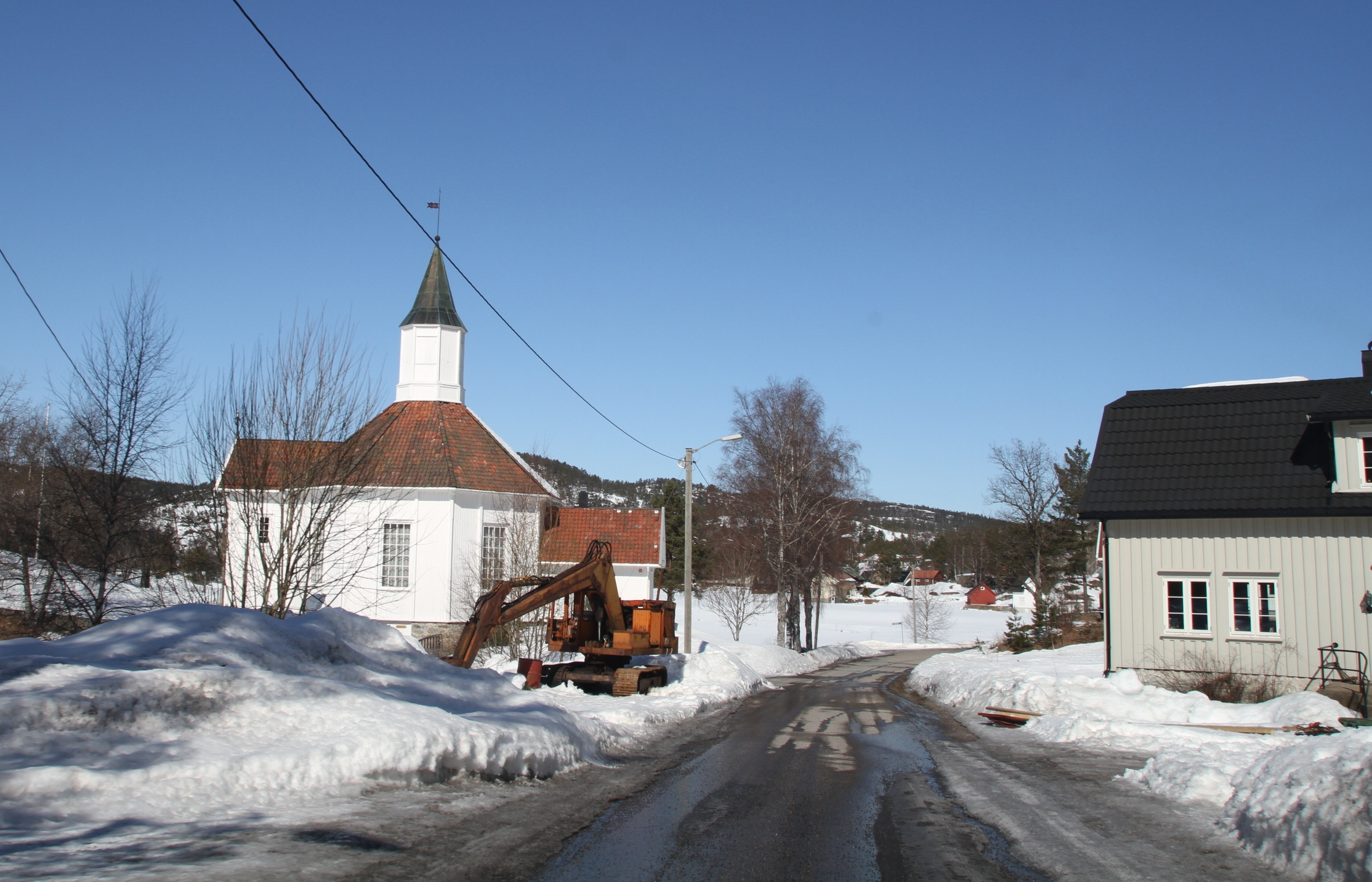

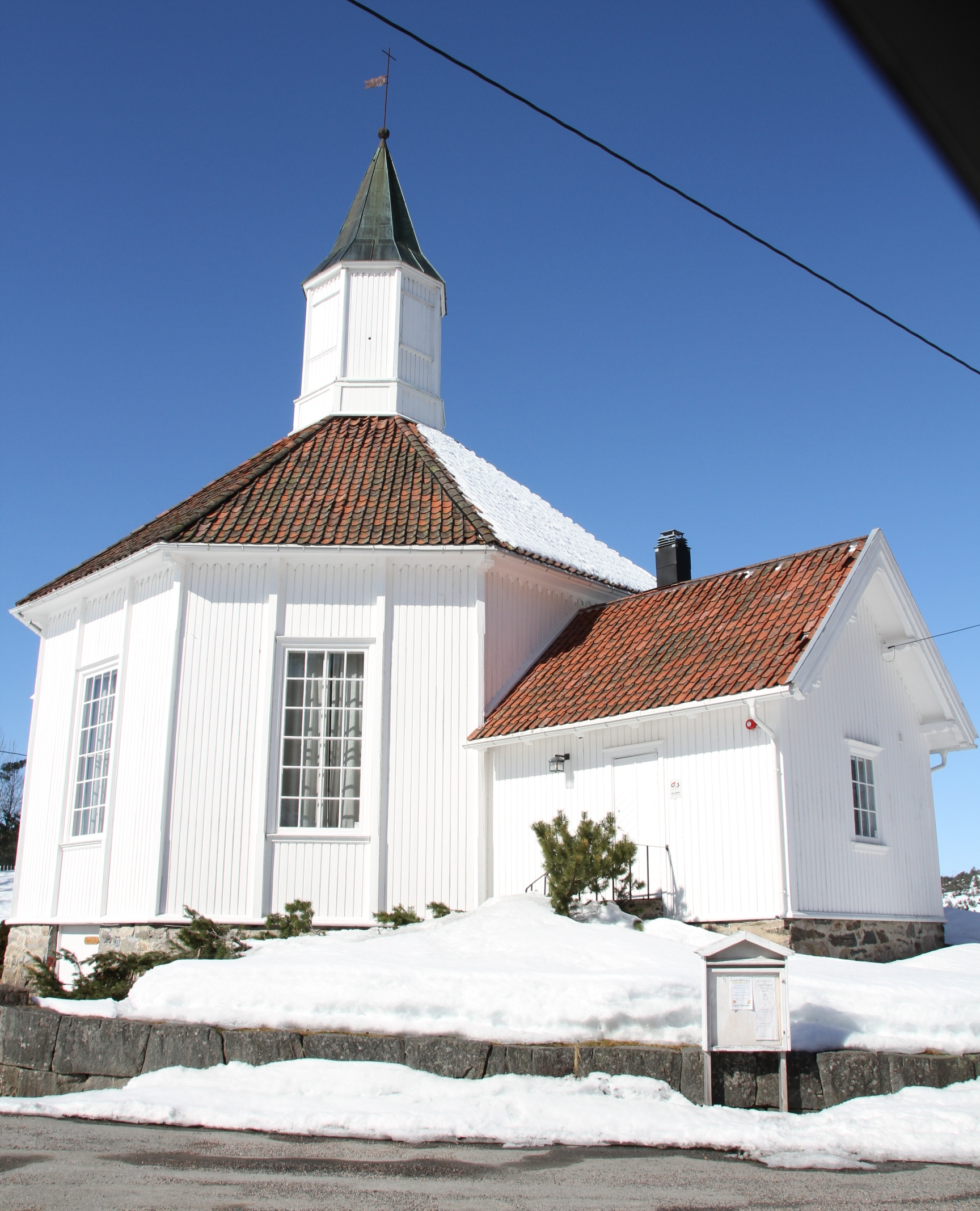

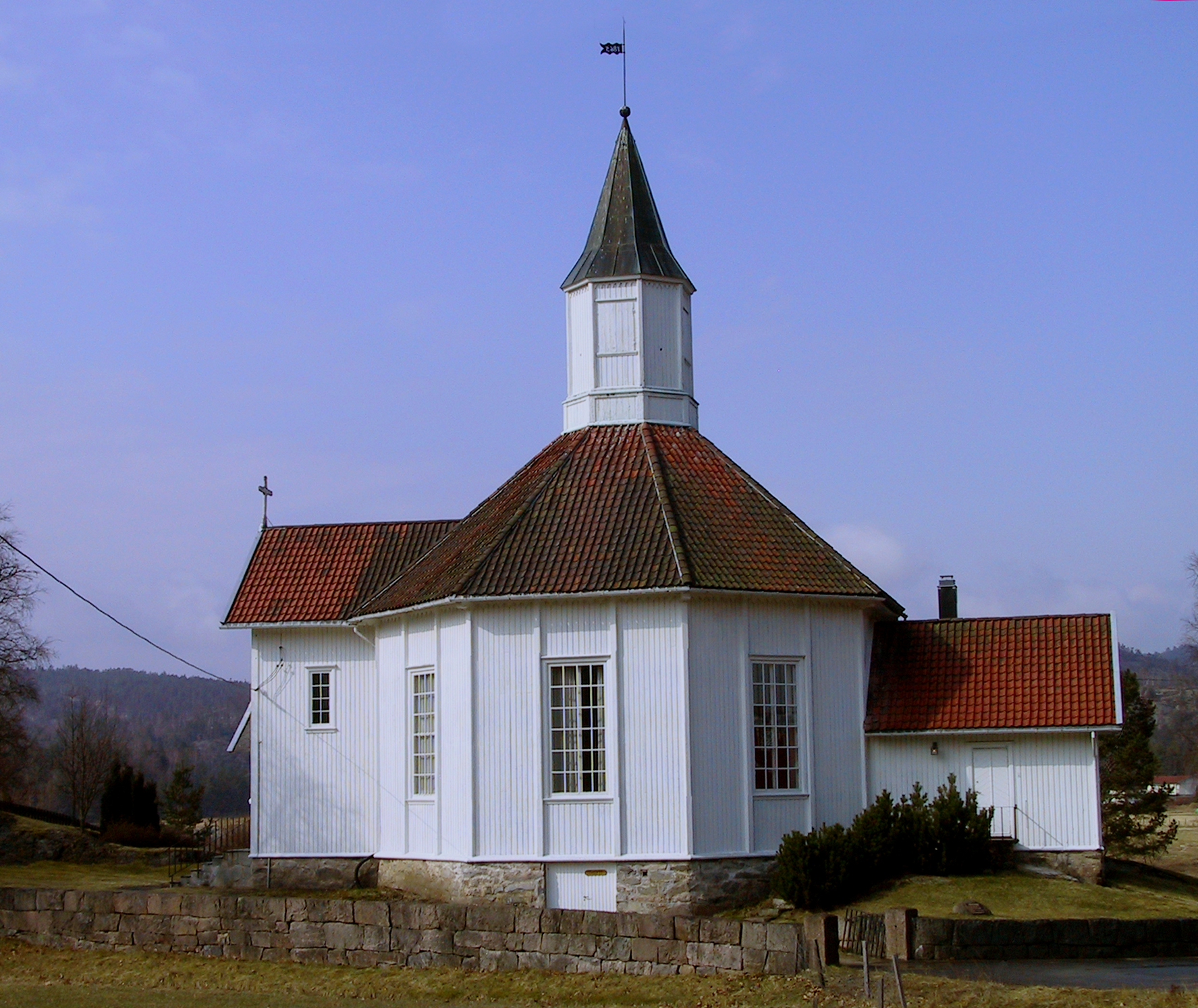

== See also ==
- List of churches in Agder og Telemark
