= Birkeland, Agder =

Village in Birkenes Municipality, Norway

Birkeland
- Village
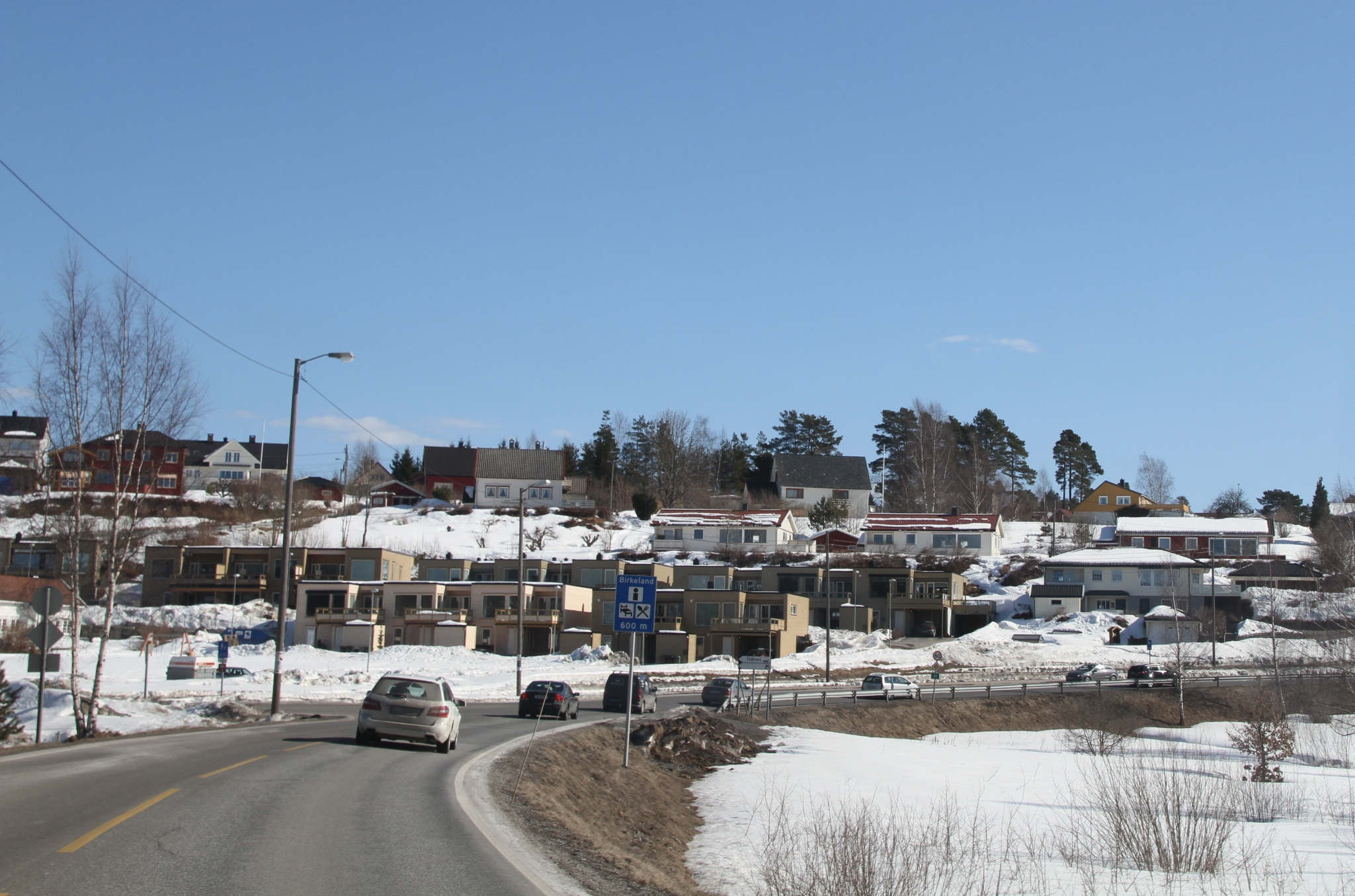
- View of the village
- Interactive map of Birkeland
- Coordinates: 58.3308°N 08.2323°E
- Country: Norway
- Region: Southern Norway
- County: Agder
- Municipality: Birkenes Municipality

Area
  - Total: 2.08 km^{2} (0.80 sq mi)
- Elevation: 51 m (167 ft)

Population (2025)
  - Total: 3,015
  - Density: 1,450/km^{2} (3,800/sq mi)
- Time zone: UTC+01:00 (CET)
  - Summer (DST): UTC+02:00 (CEST)
- Post Code: 4760 Birkeland

Birkeland is the administrative centre of Birkenes Municipality in Agder county, Norway. The village is located on the eastern shore of the river Tovdalselva, across the river from the village of Flakk. The Norwegian National Road 41 runs through the village heading southwest towards the neighboring village of Flakksvann. The village is located about 30 kilometres (19 mi) northeast of the city of Kristiansand and about 14 kilometres (8.7 mi) northwest of the town of Lillesand.

The 2.08-square-kilometre (510-acre) village has a population (2025) of 3,015 and a population density of 1,450 inhabitants per square kilometre (3,800/sq mi).

The old Lillesand–Flaksvand Line was a railway line that passed through Birkeland, but it was closed in 1953. The newspaper Birkenesavisa is published in Birkeland. The Southern Norway Folk high school is located in Birkeland and the Birkenes Church is located just south of Birkeland in the small village of Mollestad. The lake Flakksvannet lies just west of the village.
