= Norwegian National Road 41 =

Road in Norway

Coordinates: 59.072154°N 08.528137°E

National Road 41
- Bokmål: Riksvei 41; Nynorsk: Riksveg 41

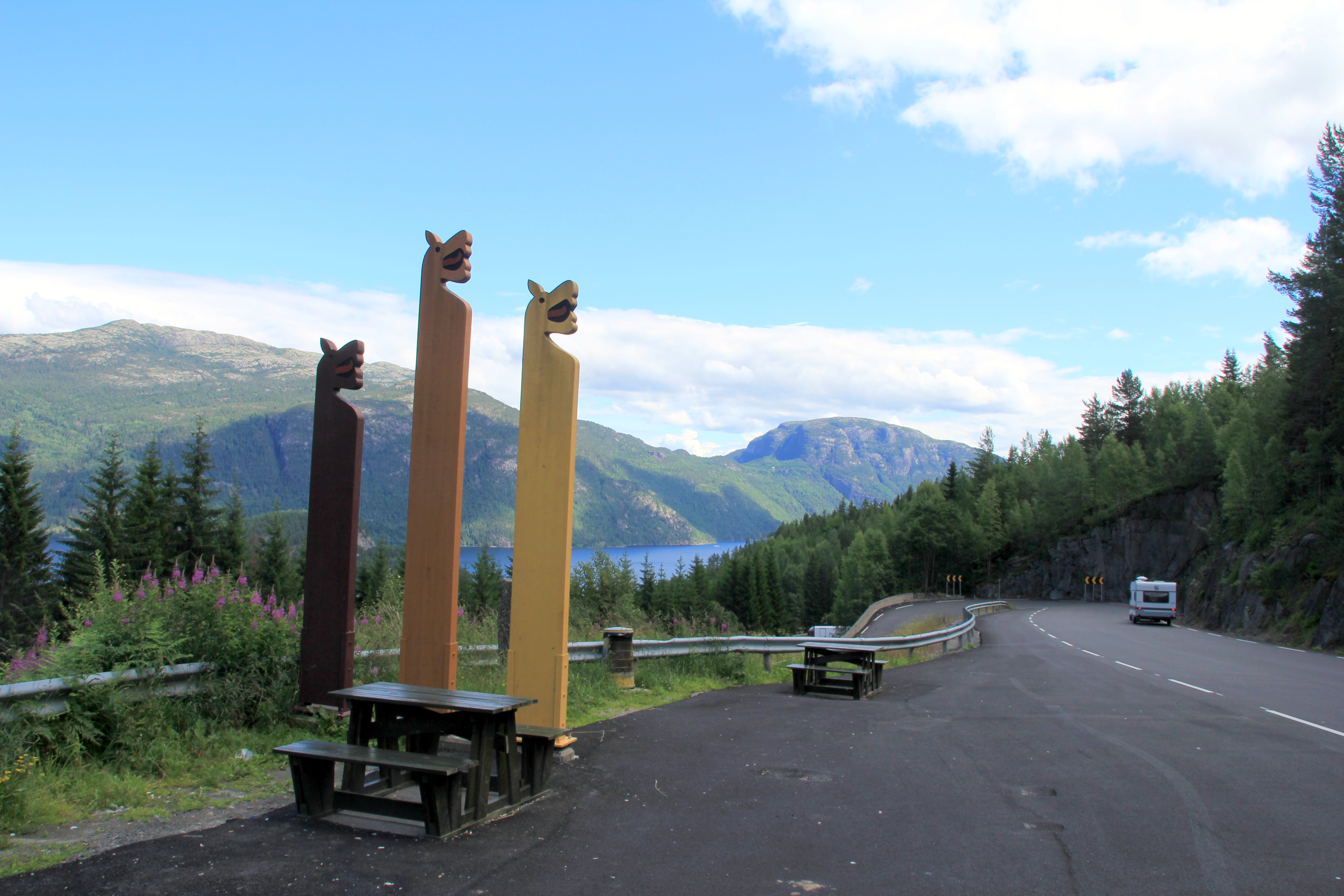
- Kviteseidkleivan rest area

Route information
- Maintained by Norwegian Public Roads Administration
- Length: 172.9 km (107.4 mi)

Major junctions
- North end: E134 at Brunkeberg, Kviteseid Municipality
- Fv404 at Herefoss, Birkenes Municipality Fv406 at Senumstad
- South end: E18 at Hånes, Kristiansand Municipality

Location
- Country: Norway

Highway system
- Roads in Norway; National Roads; County Roads

Norwegian National Road 41 (Rv 41; also known as the Telemarksveien) is a Norwegian national road that runs through Telemark and Agder counties in Norway. The road runs between the village of Brunkeberg in Kviteseid Municipality in Telemark county in the north and Timenes in Hånes in Kristiansand Municipality in Agder county in the south. The 172.9-kilometre (107.4 mi) long road connects to the European route E134 highway in the north and to the European route E18 highway in the south. The road runs for 101.5 kilometres (63.1 mi) in Agder county and 71.4 kilometres (44.4 mi) in Telemark county. The southern half of the road runs along the river Tovdalselva and the lake Herefossfjorden, and it is located in a fault zone called the Kristiansand-Porsgrunn grabenen.

The road passes through these villages in Kristiansand: Grovikheia and Tveit. The road passes through these villages in Birkenes Municipality: Mollestad, Birkeland, Søre Herefoss, and Herefoss. In Birkenes, it also passes by the Herefossfjorden and it has junctions with the Norwegian County Road 404 and Norwegian County Road 406. The road passes through the village of Hynnekleiv in Froland Municipality. The Sørlandsbanen railway line follows the road for about 8 kilometres (5.0 mi) in northern Birkenes and Froland. The road passes through these villages in Åmli Municipality: Dølemo, Eppeland, and Åmli. The road passes through these villages in Nissedal Municipality: Treungen, Kyrkjebygda, and Nordbygdi. The road passes through these villages in Kviteseid Municipality: Eidstod, Kviteseid, and Brunkeberg.

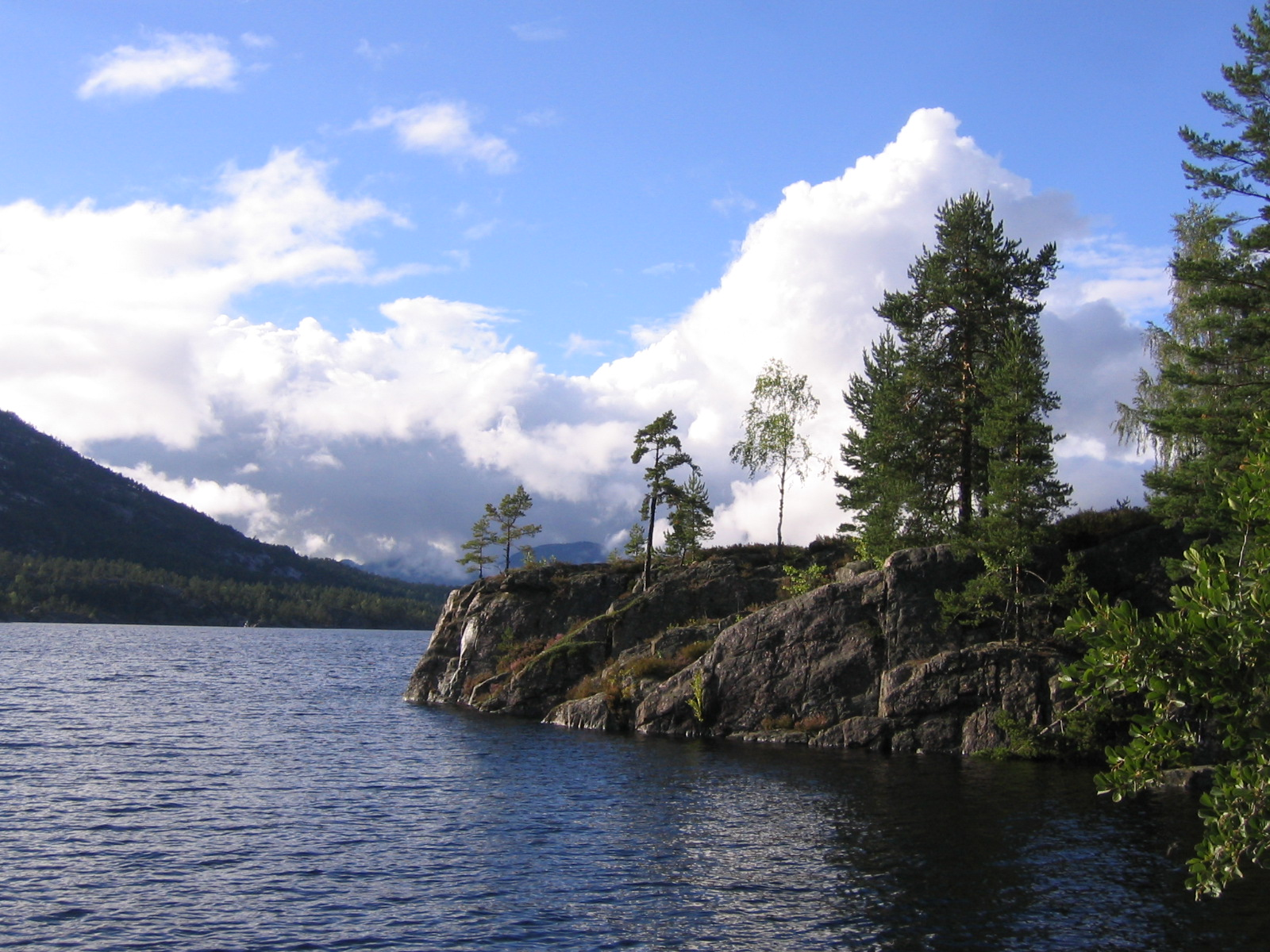
By Telemarksveien along lake Nisser

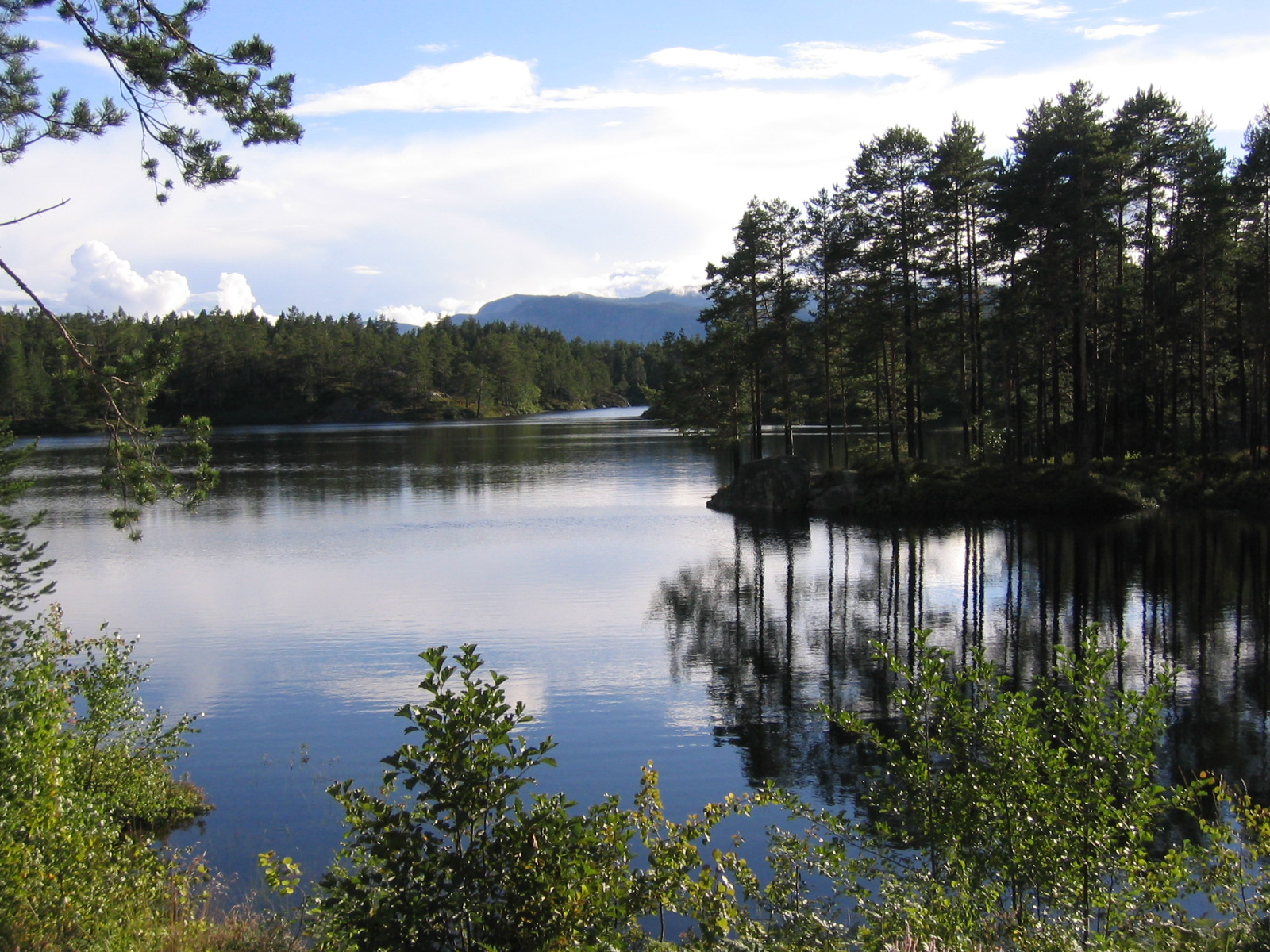
Lake by Norwegian National Road 41, Telemarksveien

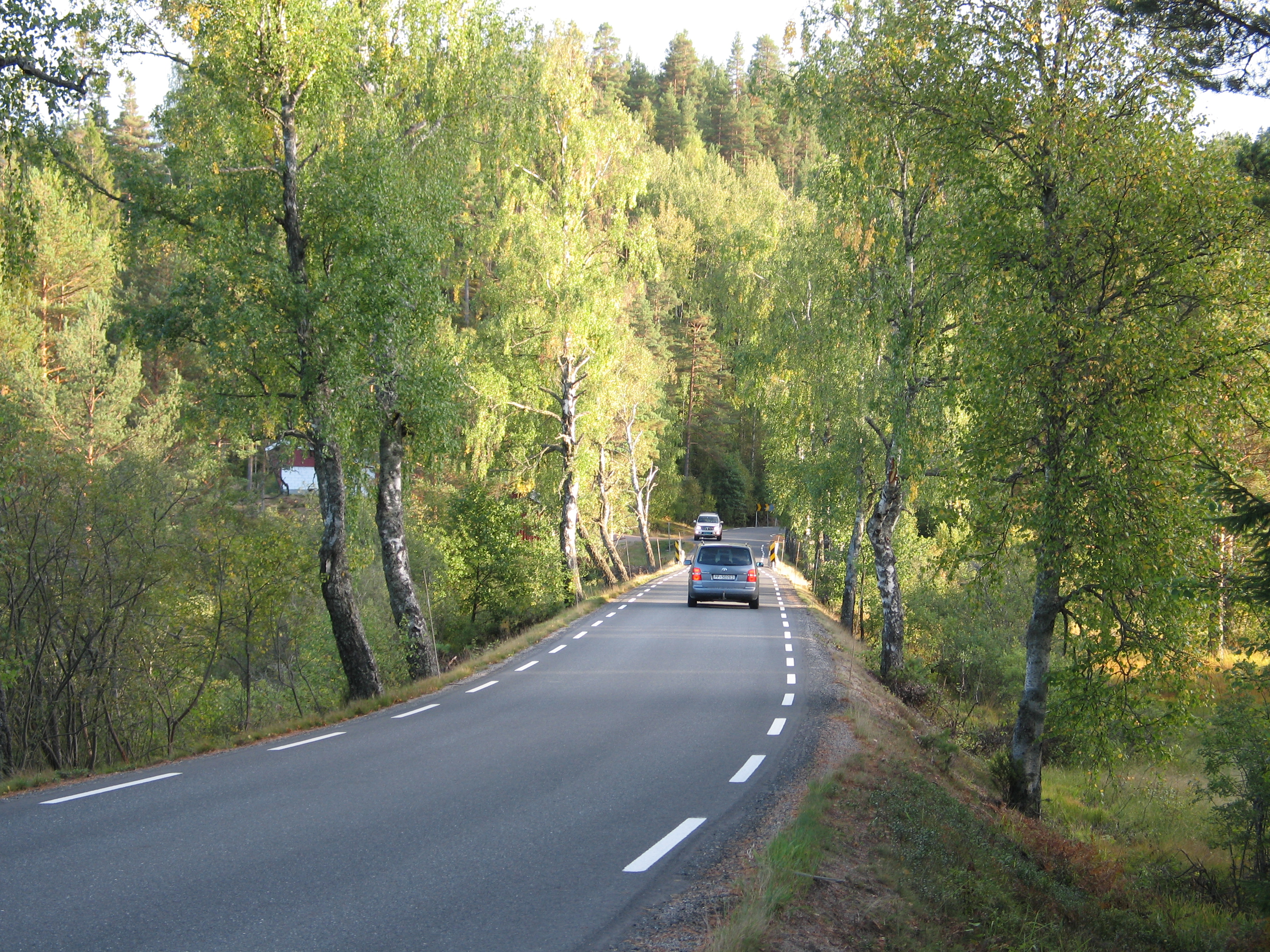
The quality of the road is highly variable, at some stretches the road is as narrow as here in Birkenes

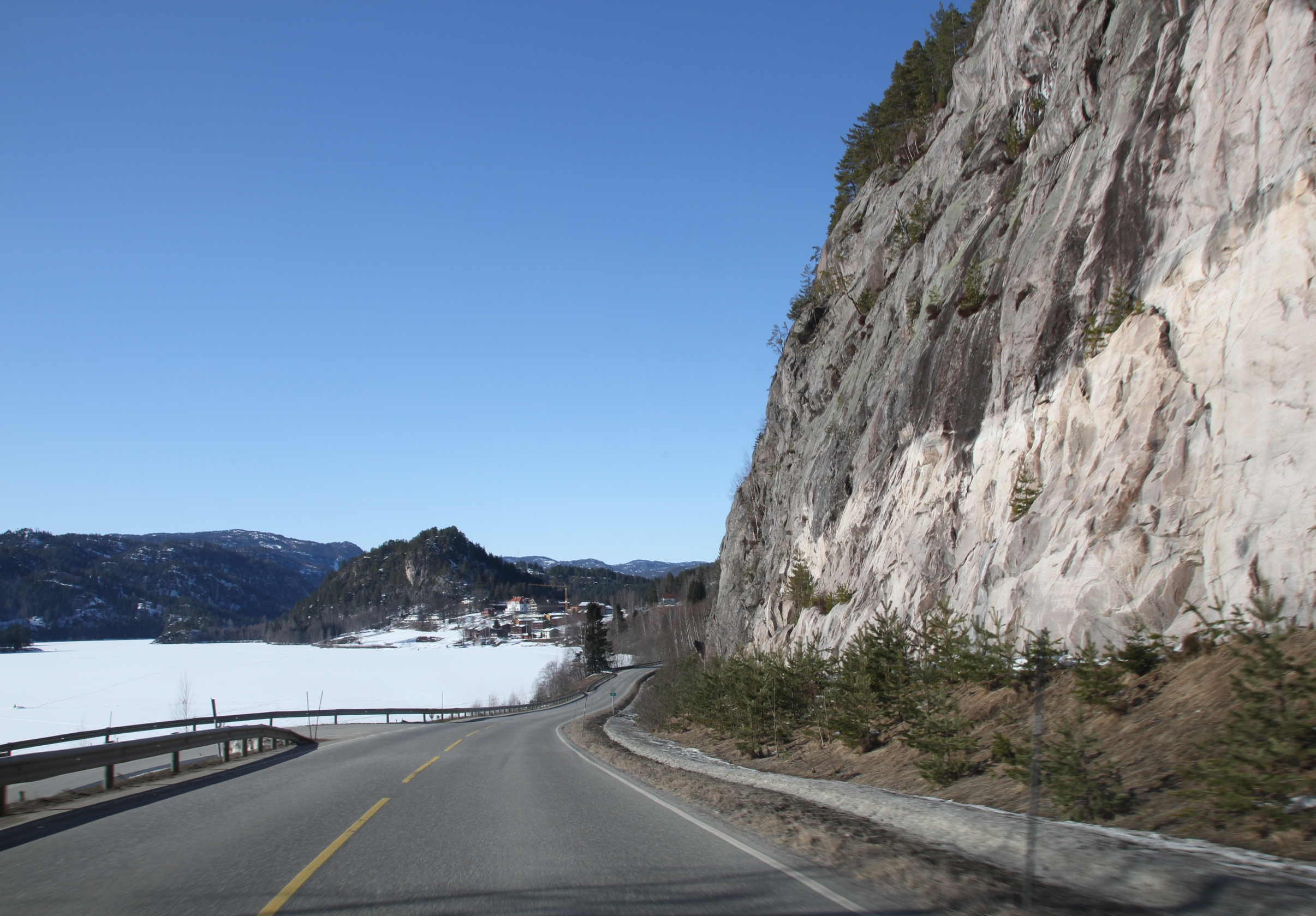
Norwegian National Road 41 passing between steep cliffs and the lake Kviteseidvatnet

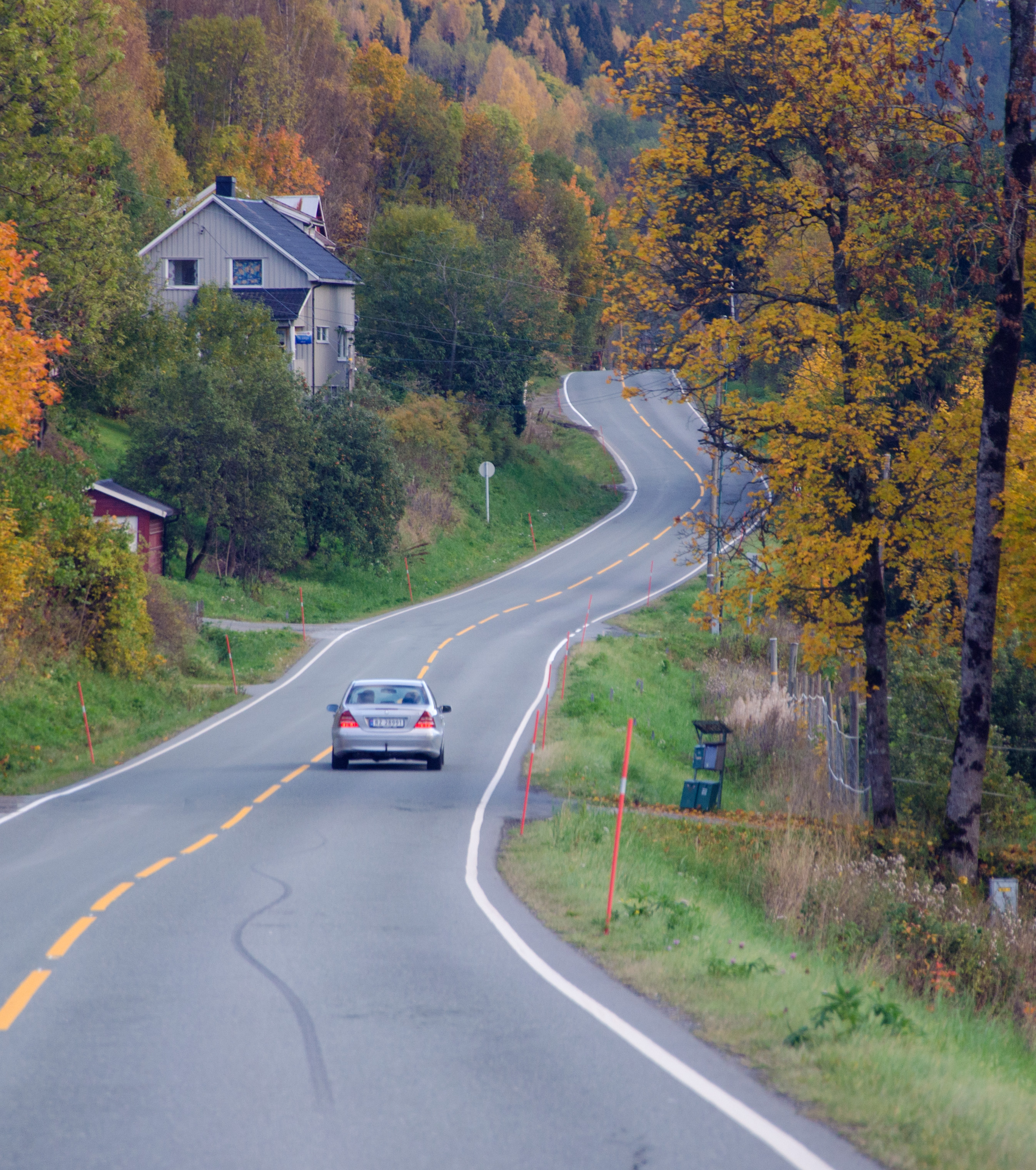
Another view of the road

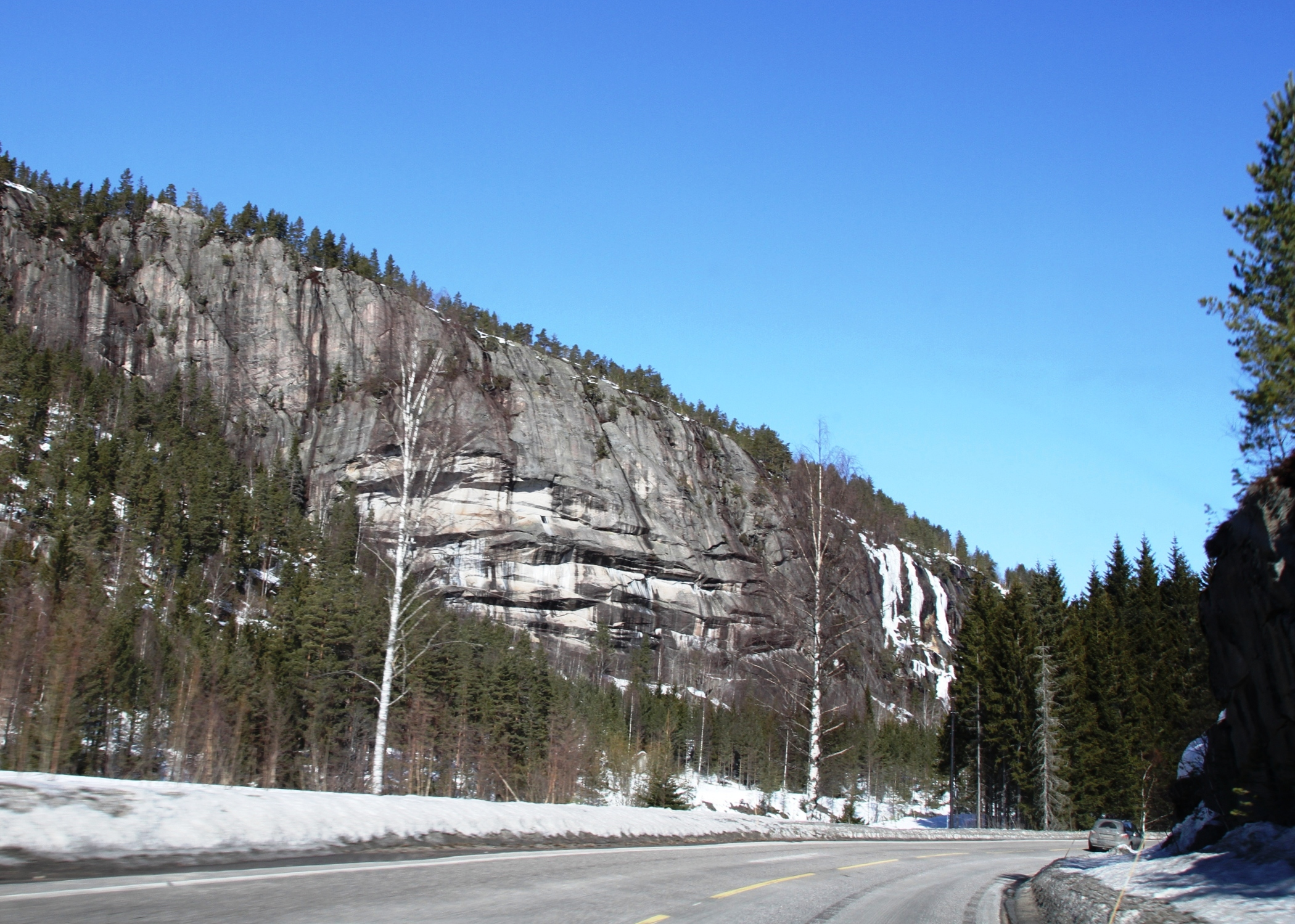
View of the road, just north of Åmli

== The Telemark Road ==
The road is known as the Telemark Road (Norwegian: Telemarksveien) and this name is used for the marketing of the road and surrounding businesses. The road passes Hamresanden Beach and Kristiansand Airport, Kjevik in the south in Kristiansand Municipality. It then heads north through the municipalities of Birkenes, Froland, Åmli, Nissedal, and Kviteseid. These are municipalities that tourists do not always find easily, so marketing the road has helped to bring people there. The Telemark road goes through a lot of beautiful, Norwegian scenery as well.
