= Søre Herefoss =

Village in Birkenes Municipality, Norway

- Village
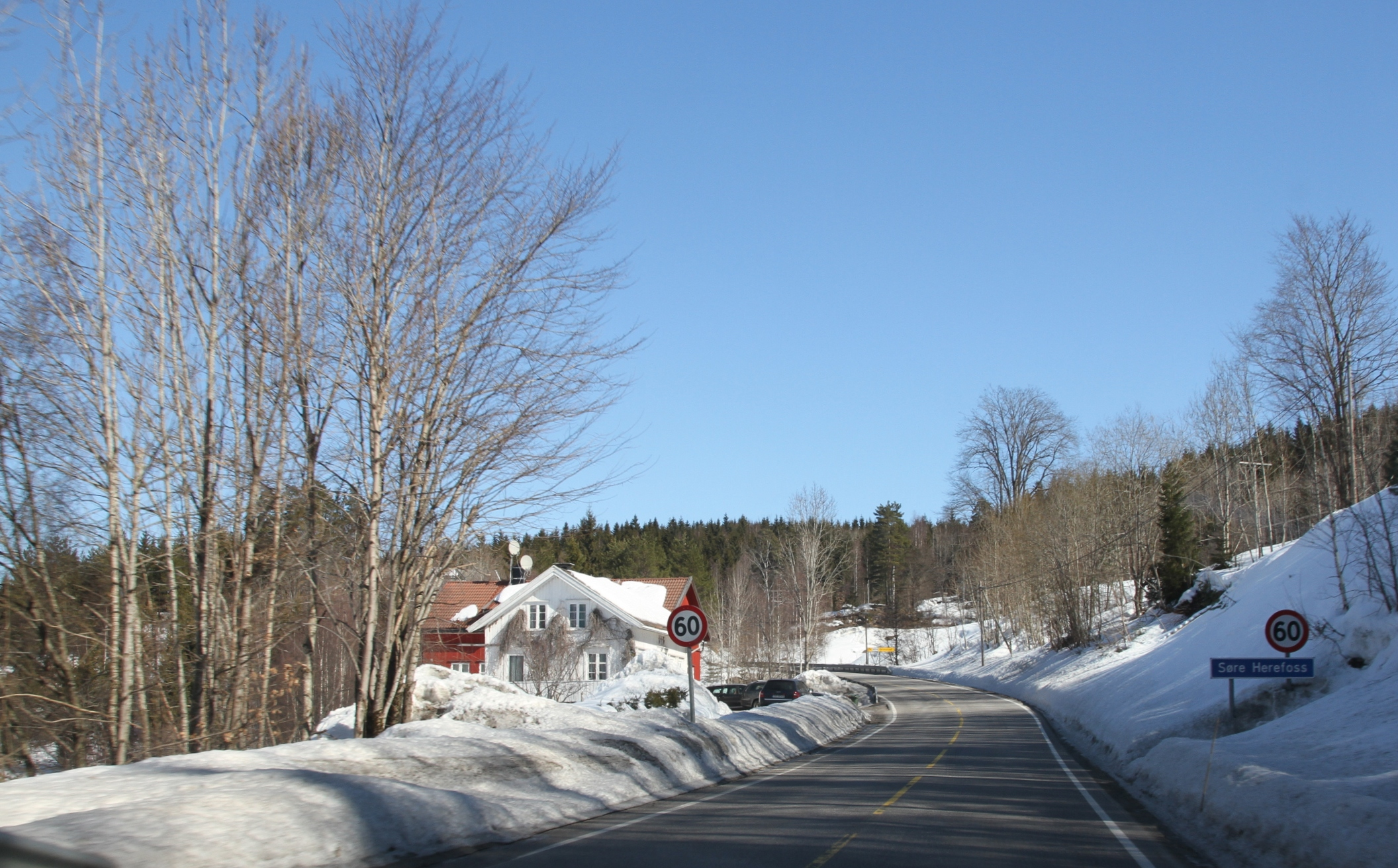
- View of the road leading into the village
- Interactive map of Søre Herefoss
- Coordinates: 58.4604°N 08.3340°E
- Country: Norway
- Region: Southern Norway
- County: Agder
- Municipality: Birkenes Municipality
- Elevation: 100 m (330 ft)
- Time zone: UTC+01:00 (CET)
  - Summer (DST): UTC+02:00 (CEST)
- Post Code: 4760 Birkeland

Søre Herefoss is a village in Birkenes Municipality in Agder county, Norway. The village is located on the southeastern shore of the lake Herefossfjorden, at the junction of the Norwegian National Road 41 and the Norwegian County Road 404. The village of Herefoss lies about 7 kilometres (4.3 mi) to the north, the village of Senumstad lies about 5.5 kilometres (3.4 mi) to the south, and the town of Grimstad lies about 30 kilometres (19 mi) to the southeast.
