= Herefossfjorden =

Lake in Agder, Norway

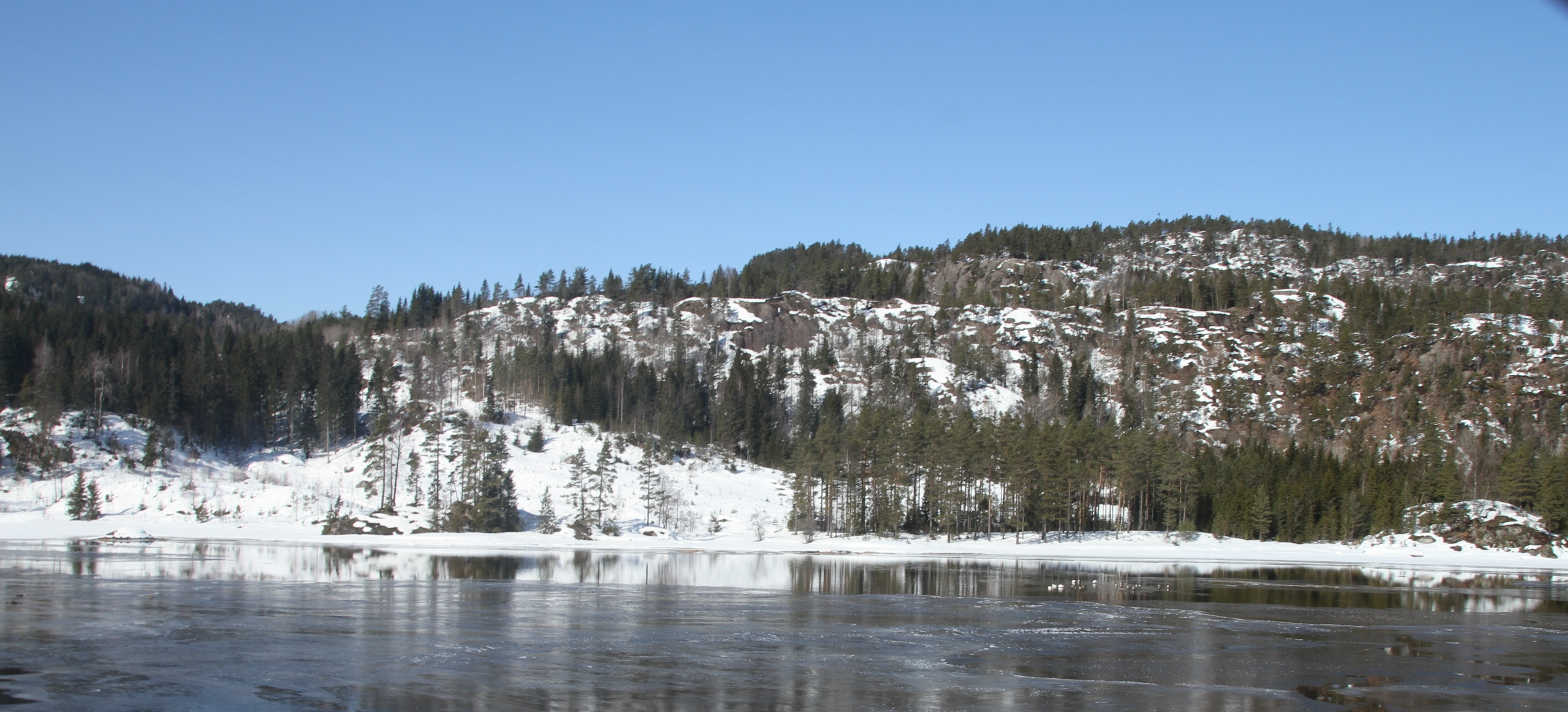
- Location: Birkenes Municipality, Agder
- Coordinates: 58.48624°N 8.33789°E
- Primary inflows: Gauslåfjorden and Uldalsåna
- Primary outflows: Tovdalselva
- Basin countries: Norway
- Max. length: 9 kilometres (5.6 mi)
- Max. width: 1 kilometre (0.62 mi)
- Surface area: 3.71 km^{2} (1.43 sq mi)
- Shore length^{1}: 20.42 kilometres (12.69 mi)
- Surface elevation: 79 metres (259 ft)
- Islands: Storøya
- Settlements: Herefoss, Søre Herefoss
- References: NVE

Location
- Interactive map of Herefossfjorden
- ^{1} Shore length is not a well-defined measure.

Herefossfjorden is a lake in Birkenes Municipality in Agder county, Norway. The 3.7-square-kilometre (1.4 sq mi) lake is about 9 kilometres (5.6 mi) long and it is part of the Tovdalselva river. The Gauslåfjorden and Uldalsåna lakes flow into Herefossfjorden near the village of Herefoss at the northern end of the lake. The Uldalsåna lake is held back by a dam and the Gauslåfjorden flows over a waterfall (called the Herefossen) into the Herefossfjorden. The Norwegian National Road 41 runs along the eastern shore. The village of Herefoss lies on the northern edge of the lake and the village of Søre Herefoss lies at the southern end of the fjord. The old Herefoss Municipality existed from 1838 until 1967 and it included all the land surrounding the lake.

== See also ==
- List of lakes in Aust-Agder
- List of lakes in Norway
