= Tovdalselva =

River in Agder, Norway

Tovdalselva Topdalselva Tovdalsåna / Tovdalsåni
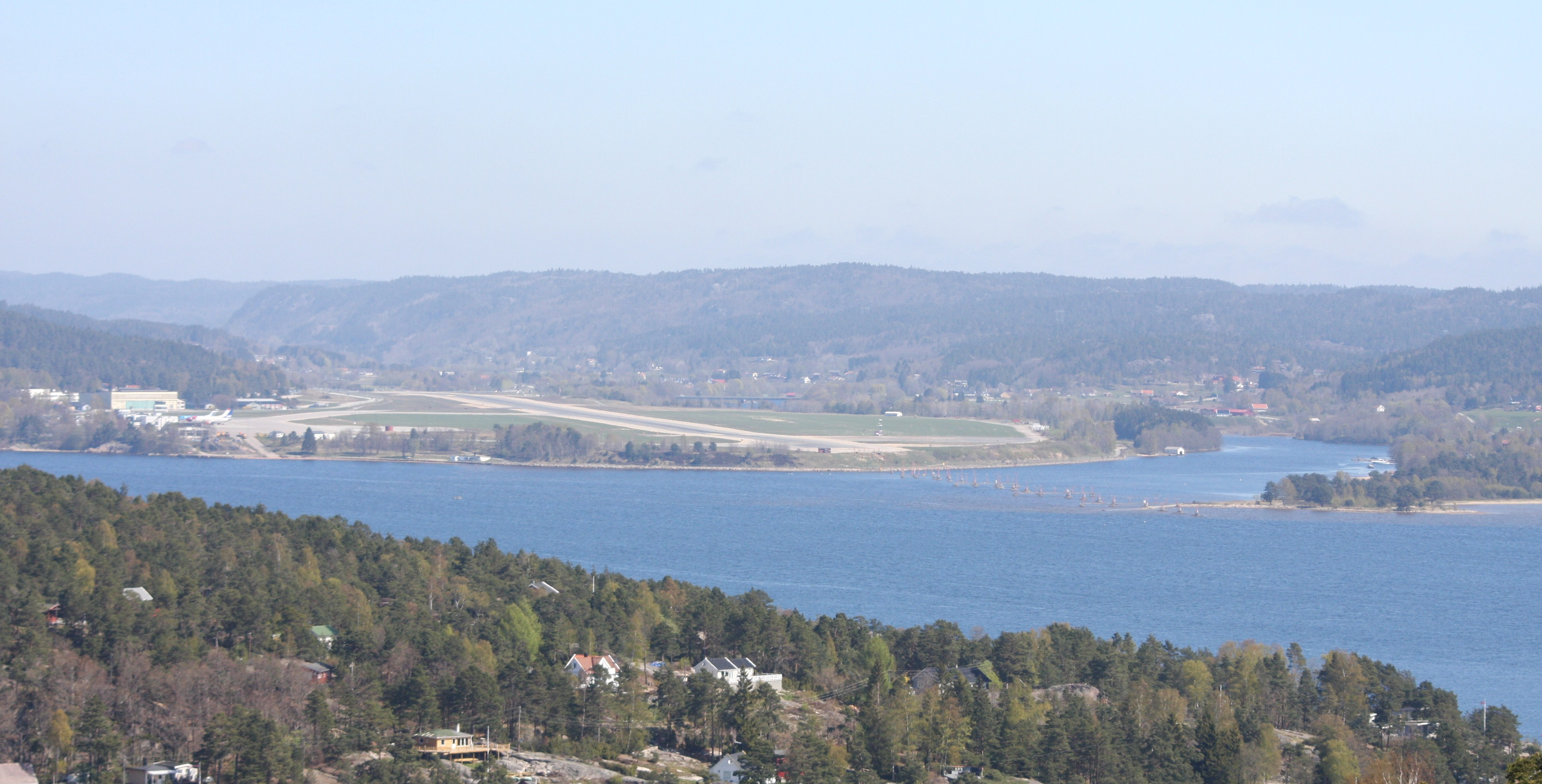
- The river mouth of Tovdalselva into Topdalsfjorden in Kristiansand. To the left, the runway of Kristiansand Airport, Kjevik.

Location
- Country: Norway
- Counties: Agder
- Municipalities: Bygland, Åmli, Froland, Birkenes, Iveland, Kristiansand

Physical characteristics
- Source
  - location: Straumsfjorden
  - coordinates: 59.1°N 7.7°E
  - elevation: 1,101 metres (3,612 ft)
- Mouth
  - location: Topdalsfjorden
  - coordinates: 58.2°N 8.1°E
  - elevation: 0 metres (0 ft)
- Length: 143 km (89 mi)
- Basin size: 1,800 km^{2} (690 sq mi)
- Discharge
  - location: Topdalsfjorden
  - average: 65 m^{3}/s (2,300 cu ft/s)

Basin features
- River system: Tovdalsvassdraget
- Waterbodies: Straumsfjorden, Topsæ, Herefossfjorden

Tovdalselva (also known as Topdalselva, Tovdalsåna, or Tovdalsåni; lit. 'Tov valley river') is 143 kilometres (89 mi) long and is one of the longest rivers in Southern Norway. The river flows through Agder county from the mountains on the northeast side of the Setesdal valley in Valle Municipality southwards, until it reaches the sea at the Tofdalsfjorden between Hamresanden and Kjevik in Kristiansand Municipality. The upper reaches of the river include many lakes such as the Herefossfjorden and the Straumsfjorden (the largest lake on the river). It drains about 1,800 square kilometres (690 sq mi) in territory and the highest point in the watershed is 1,101 metres (3,612 ft) above sea level. The drainage basin includes parts or all of the following municipalities: Fyresdal, Valle, Bygland, Evje og Hornnes, Åmli, Froland, Grimstad, Birkenes, Iveland, Lillesand, and Kristiansand.

== Fishing ==
Tovdalselva was long considered one of the greatest salmon fishing rivers in the land. From 1880 to 1883, it was Norway's third most productive salmon river, calculated both by weight and by value of the salmon caught. This had decreased seriously by the 1900s. By 1970, the salmon fishing in the Tovdalselva was almost completely lost.
