= Åmli =

Åmli may refer to:

== Places ==
- Åmli Municipality, a municipality in Agder county, Norway
- Åmli (village), a village within Åmli Municipality in Agder county, Norway
- Åmli Church, a church in Åmli Municipality in Agder county, Norway
- Åmli Station, a railway station in Åmli Municipality in Agder county, Norway
