= Øvre Ramse =

Village in Åmli Municipality, Norway

- Village
- Interactive map of Øvre Ramse
- Coordinates: 58.7930°N 08.2275°E
- Country: Norway
- Region: Southern Norway
- County: Agder
- District: Østre Agder
- Municipality: Åmli Municipality
- Elevation: 195 m (640 ft)
- Time zone: UTC+01:00 (CET)
  - Summer (DST): UTC+02:00 (CEST)
- Post Code: 4869 Dølemo

Øvre Ramse is a village in Åmli Municipality in Agder county, Norway. The village is located along the river Tovdalsåna. The village is about 3.5 kilometres (2.2 mi) north of the village of Ytre Ramse and about 14 kilometres (8.7 mi) northwest of the village of Dølemo. The village of Hillestad and the Tovdal Church lie about 4 kilometres (2.5 mi) to the northwest of Øvre Ramse.
