= Tveit, Åmli =

Village in Åmli Municipality, Norway

Tveit
- Village
- Interactive map of Tveit
- Coordinates: 58.7650°N 08.5360°E
- Country: Norway
- Region: Southern Norway
- County: Agder
- District: Østre Agder
- Municipality: Åmli Municipality
- Elevation: 198 m (650 ft)
- Time zone: UTC+01:00 (CET)
  - Summer (DST): UTC+02:00 (CEST)
- Post Code: 4865 Åmli

Tveit is a village in Åmli Municipality in Agder county, Norway. The village is located about 2.5 kilometres (1.6 mi) east of the municipal centre of Åmli on the other side of the mountain Tveitfjellet.
