= Homdrom =

Village in Åmli Municipality, Norway

- Village
- Interactive map of Homdrom
- Coordinates: 58.8338°N 08.3973°E
- Country: Norway
- Region: Southern Norway
- County: Agder
- District: Østre Agder
- Municipality: Åmli Municipality
- Elevation: 278 m (912 ft)
- Time zone: UTC+01:00 (CET)
  - Summer (DST): UTC+02:00 (CEST)
- Post Code: 4865 Åmli

Homdrom is a village in Åmli Municipality in Agder county, Norway. The village is located in the Gjøv river valley, about 13 kilometres (8.1 mi) northwest of the village of Åmli and about 8 kilometres (5.0 mi) southeast of the village of Askland.
