= Måvatn =

Lake in Agder, Norway

- Interactive map of Måvatn
- Location: Åmli Municipality, Agder
- Coordinates: 58.89273°N 8.34445°E
- Basin countries: Norway
- Max. length: 3.3 kilometres (2.1 mi)
- Max. width: 2.2 kilometres (1.4 mi)
- Surface area: 3.37 km^{2} (1.30 sq mi)
- Shore length^{1}: 11.09 kilometres (6.89 mi)
- Surface elevation: 549 metres (1,801 ft)
- Islands: Storøya, Lisleøya
- References: NVE
- ^{1} Shore length is not a well-defined measure.

Måvatn is a lake in Åmli Municipality in Agder county, Norway. It is located about 2.5 kilometres (1.6 mi) northeast of the village of Askland in the Gjøv river valley and about 1 kilometre (0.62 mi) south of the border with Nissedal Municipality in Telemark county.

== See also ==
- List of lakes in Norway
