= Gjøvdal Municipality =

Former municipality in Aust-Agder, Norway

Gjøvdal Municipality Gjøvdal herad
- Former municipality
- Gjevedal herad (historic name)
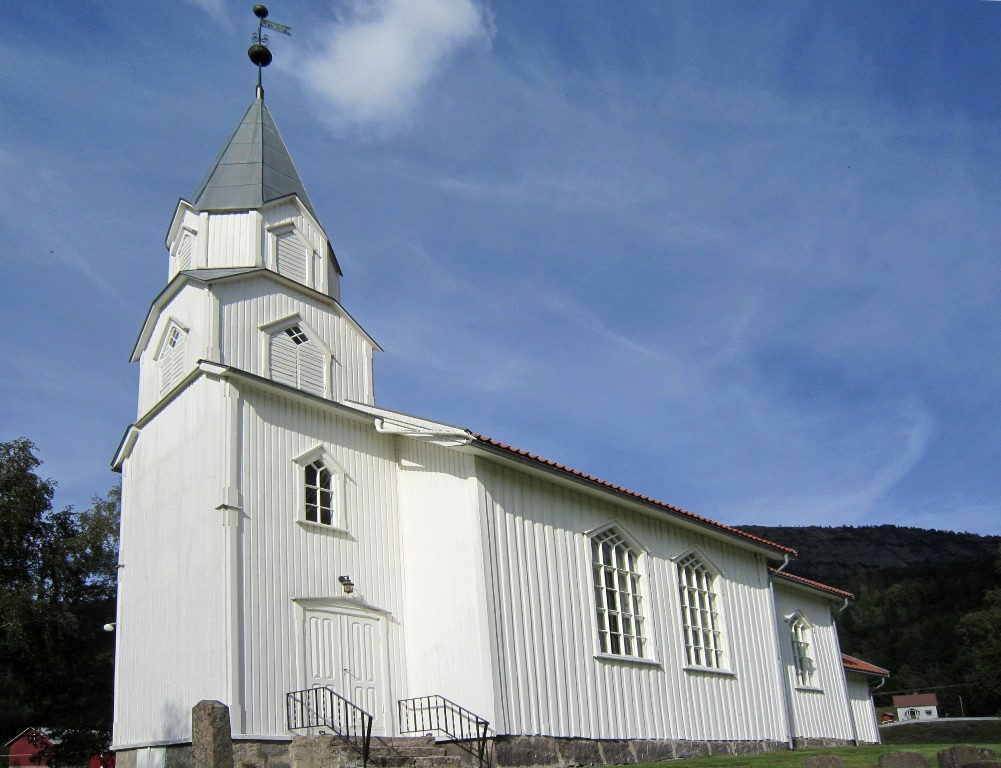
- View of the local Gjøvdal Church

- Aust-Agder within Norway

- Gjøvdal within Aust-Agder
- Coordinates: 58°52′18″N 08°18′14″E
- Country: Norway
- County: Aust-Agder
- District: Østre Agder
- Established: 1 Jan 1908
  - Preceded by: Åmli Municipality
- Disestablished: 1 Jan 1960
  - Succeeded by: Åmli Municipality
- Administrative centre: Askland

Government
  - Mayor (1957–1959): Gunnar Støylen

Area (upon dissolution)
  - Total: 346.3 km^{2} (133.7 sq mi)
  - Rank: #258 in Norway
- Highest elevation: 929.27 m (3,048.8 ft)

Population (1959)
  - Total: 377
  - Rank: #341 in Norway
  - Density: 1.1/km^{2} (2.8/sq mi)
  - Change (10 years): ▼ −3.3%
- Demonym: Gjøvdøl

Official language
  - Norwegian form: Nynorsk
- Time zone: UTC+01:00 (CET)
  - Summer (DST): UTC+02:00 (CEST)
- ISO 3166 code: NO-0930

Gjøvdal is a former municipality in the old Aust-Agder county, Norway. The 346.3-square-kilometre (133.7 sq mi) municipality existed from 1908 until its dissolution in 1960. The area is now part of Åmli Municipality in the traditional district of Østre Agder in Agder county. The administrative centre was the village of Askland where Gjøvdal Church is located.

Prior to its dissolution in 1960, the 346.3-square-kilometre (133.7 sq mi) municipality was the 258th largest by area out of the 743 municipalities in Norway. Gjøvdal Municipality was the 341st most populous municipality in Norway with a population of about 377. The municipality's population density was 1.1 inhabitants per square kilometre (2.8/sq mi) and its population had decreased by 3.3% over the previous 10-year period.

== General information ==
=== Administrative history ===
The municipality of Gjevedal (later spelled "Gjøvdal") was established on 1 January 1908 when the large Aamli Municipality was divided into three:

- the northern district (population: 590) became the new Gjevedal Municipality
- the western district (population: 389) became the new Lille Topdal Municipality (later called "Tovdal Municipality")
- the eastern district (population: 2,024) continued as a smaller Aamli Municipality

During the 1960s, there were many municipal mergers across Norway due to the work of the Schei Committee. On 1 January 1960, Gjøvdal Municipality was dissolved and the following areas were merged to form an enlarged Åmli Municipality:

- all of Gjøvdal Municipality (population: 362)
- all of Åmli Municipality (population: 1,947)

In 1967, Tovdal Municipality was also merged into Åmli Municipality, recreating the old Åmli Municipality that existed prior to 1908.

=== Name ===
The municipality (originally the parish) is named after the Gjevedal valley (Old Norse: Gefardalr). The first element of the name comes from the name of the river Gjøv (Old Norse: Gef) which flows through the valley. That name comes from the verb gefa which means "to give someone something". The last element is dalr which means "valley" or "dale". Thus, "the valley that gives"

Historically, the name of the municipality was spelled Gjevedal. On 18 September 1914, a royal resolution changed the spelling of the name of the municipality to Gjøvdal.

=== Churches ===
The Church of Norway had one parish (sokn) within Gjøvdal Municipality. At the time of the municipal dissolution, it was part of the Åmli prestegjeld and the Aust-Nedenes prosti (deanery) in the Diocese of Agder.

Churches in Gjøvdal Municipality
Parish (sokn)	Church name	Location of the church	Year built
Gjøvdal	Gjøvdal Church	Askland	1808

== Geography ==
The municipality included the Gjøv river valley and the surrounding moorland. The highest point in the municipality was the 929.27-metre (3,048.8 ft) tall mountain Trongedalsnuten. Fyresdal Municipality was located to the north (in Telemark county), Nissedal Municipality was located to the northeast (in Telemark county), Åmli Municipality was located to the east, and Tovdal Municipality was located to the south and west.

== Government ==
While it existed, Gjøvdal Municipality was responsible for primary education (through 10th grade), outpatient health services, senior citizen services, welfare and other social services, zoning, economic development, and municipal roads and utilities. The municipality was governed by a municipal council of directly elected representatives. The mayor was indirectly elected by a vote of the municipal council. The municipality was under the jurisdiction of the Nedenes District Court and the Agder Court of Appeal.

=== Municipal council ===
The municipal council (Heradsstyre) of Gjøvdal Municipality was made up of 13 representatives that were elected to four year terms. The tables below show the historical composition of the council by political party.

Gjøvdal heradsstyre 1955–1959
Party name (in Nynorsk)	Number of representatives
Labour Party (Arbeidarpartiet)	9
Farmers' Party (Bondepartiet)	4
Total number of members:	13
Note: On 1 January 1960, Gjøvdal Municipality became part of Åmli Municipality.

Gjøvdal heradsstyre 1951–1955
Party name (in Nynorsk)	Number of representatives
Labour Party (Arbeidarpartiet)	7
Joint List(s) of Non-Socialist Parties (Borgarlege Felleslister)	5
Total number of members:	12

Gjøvdal heradsstyre 1947–1951
Party name (in Nynorsk)	Number of representatives
Labour Party (Arbeidarpartiet)	7
Joint List(s) of Non-Socialist Parties (Borgarlege Felleslister)	5
Total number of members:	12

Gjøvdal heradsstyre 1945–1947
Party name (in Nynorsk)	Number of representatives
Labour Party (Arbeidarpartiet)	7
Joint List(s) of Non-Socialist Parties (Borgarlege Felleslister)	5
Total number of members:	12

Gjøvdal heradsstyre 1937–1941*
Party name (in Nynorsk)	Number of representatives
Labour Party (Arbeidarpartiet)	7
Joint list of the Farmers' Party (Bondepartiet) and the Liberal Party (Venstre)	5
Total number of members:	12
Note: Due to the German occupation of Norway during World War II, no elections were held for new municipal councils until after the war ended in 1945.

=== Mayors ===
The mayor (Nynorsk: ordførar) of Gjøvdal Municipality was the political leader of the municipality and the chairperson of the municipal council. The following people have held this position:

- 1908–1910: Halvor Olstad
- 1911–1913: Eyvind Salvessen
- 1914–1916: G.G. Askeland
- 1917–1922: Eyvind Askeland
- 1923–1925: Nils Jørgenland
- 1926–1928: Halvor Jørgensen Smeland (Ap)
- 1929–1933: G.G. Askeland
- 1933–1940: Halvor Jørgensen Smeland (Ap)
- 1941–1942: Eyvind Askeland (NS)
- 1942–1945: Olav E. Omland (NS)
- 1945–1945: Halvor Jørgensen Smeland (Ap)
- 1946–1955: Gjermund Flaten (Ap)
- 1955–1957: Halvor Jørgensen Smeland (Ap)
- 1957–1959: Gunnar Støylen

== See also ==
- List of former municipalities of Norway
