= Ytre Ramse =

Village in Åmli Municipality, Norway

- Village
- Interactive map of Ytre Ramse
- Coordinates: 58.7686°N 08.2562°E
- Country: Norway
- Region: Southern Norway
- County: Agder
- District: Østre Agder
- Municipality: Åmli Municipality
- Elevation: 215 m (705 ft)
- Time zone: UTC+01:00 (CET)
  - Summer (DST): UTC+02:00 (CEST)
- Post Code: 4869 Dølemo

Ytre Ramse is a village in Åmli Municipality in Agder county, Norway. The village is located along the river Tovdalsåna. The village is about 3.5 kilometres (2.2 mi) south of the village of Øvre Ramse and about 10 kilometres (6.2 mi) northwest of the village of Dølemo. The Skjeggedal area lies about 8 kilometres (5.0 mi) to the west (in the next valley).
