= Nasvatn =

Lake in Agder, Norway

- Interactive map of Nasvatn
- Location: Åmli Municipality, Agder
- Coordinates: 58.84472°N 8.15806°E
- Basin countries: Norway
- Max. length: 2.7 kilometres (1.7 mi)
- Max. width: 3 kilometres (1.9 mi)
- Surface area: 2.46 km^{2} (0.95 sq mi)
- Shore length^{1}: 19.36 kilometres (12.03 mi)
- Surface elevation: 618 metres (2,028 ft)
- References: NVE
- ^{1} Shore length is not a well-defined measure.

Nasvatn is a lake in Åmli Municipality in Agder county, Norway. It is located about 3.5 kilometres (2.2 mi) north of the village of Hillestad in the mountains above the Tovdalselva river valley. The lake has a small dam on the southwestern end, and the water leaving the lake goes down a large waterfall and eventually drains into the river.

== See also ==
- List of lakes in Aust-Agder
