= Tovdal Municipality =

Former municipality in Aust-Agder, Norway

Tovdal Municipality Tovdal herad
- Former municipality
- Lille Topdal herad (historic name)
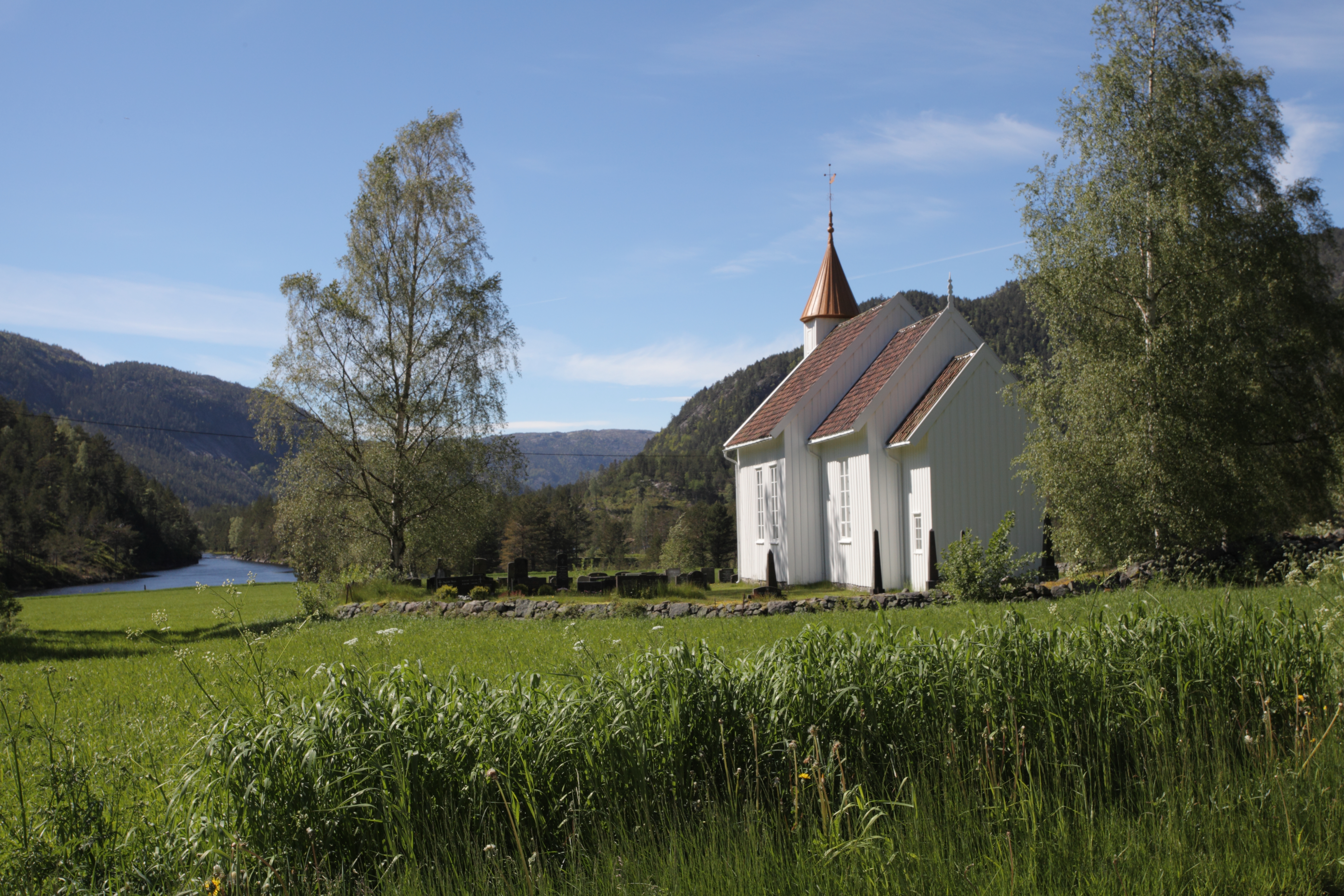
- View of Tovdal Church and the river Tovdalselva

- Aust-Agder within Norway

- Tovdal within Aust-Agder
- Coordinates: 58°48′24″N 08°10′30″E
- Country: Norway
- County: Aust-Agder
- District: Østre Agder
- Established: 1 Jan 1908
  - Preceded by: Åmli Municipality
- Disestablished: 1 Jan 1967
  - Succeeded by: Åmli Municipality
- Administrative centre: Hillestad

Government
  - Mayor (1964–1966): Olav T. Ramse (Sp)

Area
  - Total: 376.4 km^{2} (145.3 sq mi)
  - Rank: #244 in Norway
- Highest elevation: 872 m (2,861 ft)

Population (1966)
  - Total: 167
  - Rank: #460 in Norway
  - Density: 0.4/km^{2} (1.0/sq mi)
  - Change (10 years): ▼ −20.9%
- Demonym: Tovdøl

Official language
  - Norwegian form: Nynorsk
- Time zone: UTC+01:00 (CET)
  - Summer (DST): UTC+02:00 (CEST)
- ISO 3166 code: NO-0931

Tovdal is a former municipality in the old Aust-Agder county, Norway. The 376.4-square-kilometre (145.3 sq mi) municipality existed from 1908 until its dissolution in 1967. The area is now part of Åmli Municipality in the traditional district of Østre Agder in Agder county. The administrative centre was the village of Hillestad where the Tovdal Church is located.

Prior to its dissolution in 1967, the 376.4-square-kilometre (145.3 sq mi) municipality was the 244th largest by area out of the 460 municipalities in Norway. Tovdal Municipality was the 460th most populous municipality in Norway with a population of about 167, making it the smallest municipality in the nation by population. The municipality's population density was 0.4 inhabitants per square kilometre (1.0/sq mi) and its population had decreased by 20.9% over the previous 10-year period.

== General information ==
=== Administrative history ===
The municipality of Lille Topdal (later renamed "Tovdal") was established on 1 January 1908 when the large Aamli Municipality was divided into three:

- the western district (population: 389) became the new Lille Topdal Municipality
- the northern district (population: 590) became the new Gjevedal Municipality (later spelled "Gjøvdal Municipality")
- the eastern district (population: 2,024) continued as a smaller Aamli Municipality

During the 1960s, there were many municipal mergers across Norway due to the work of the Schei Committee. On 1 January 1967, Tovdal Municipality was the smallest municipality in Norway, so it was dissolved and the following areas were merged to form an enlarged Åmli Municipality:

- all of Tovdal Municipality (population: 161)
- all of Åmli Municipality (population: 2,050)

=== Name ===
The municipality (originally the parish) was first named "Lille Topdal" after the Topdalen valley (Old Norse: Þofnardalr). The first element comes from the old name for the local river Tovdalselva. That name is likely derived from the word þúfa which means "mound" or "tuft". The last element is dalr which means "valley" or "dale". The prefix of the name is lille which means "little".

Historically, the name of the municipality was Lille Topdal. On 3 November 1917, a royal resolution changed the spelling of the name of the municipality to simply Tovdal, dropping the prefix lille and changing the p to a v.

=== Churches ===
The Church of Norway had one parish (sokn) within Tovdal Municipality. At the time of the municipal dissolution, it was part of the Åmli prestegjeld and the Aust-Nedenes prosti (deanery) in the Diocese of Agder.

Churches in Tovdal Municipality
| Parish (sokn) | Church name | Location of the church | Year built |
|---|---|---|---|
| Tovdal | Tovdal Church | Hillestad | 1820 |

== Geography ==
Tovdal Municipality included the river valley surrounding the river Tovdalselva. The highest point in the municipality was the 872-metre (2,861 ft) tall mountain Midtstøylnuten. Åmli Municipality was located to the north and east, Mykland Municipality was located to the south, and Bygland Municipality was located to the west.

== Government ==
While it existed, Tovdal Municipality was responsible for primary education (through 10th grade), outpatient health services, senior citizen services, welfare and other social services, zoning, economic development, and municipal roads and utilities. The municipality was governed by a municipal council of directly elected representatives. The mayor was indirectly elected by a vote of the municipal council. The municipality was under the jurisdiction of the Nedenes District Court and the Agder Court of Appeal.

=== Municipal council ===
The municipal council (Heradsstyre) of Tovdal Municipality was made up of 13 representatives that were elected to four year terms. The tables below show the historical composition of the council by political party.

Tovdal heradsstyre 1963–1966
| Party name (in Nynorsk) | Number of representatives |
|---|---|
| Labour Party (Arbeidarpartiet) | 4 |
| Joint List(s) of Non-Socialist Parties (Borgarlege Felleslister) | 6 |
| Local List(s) (Lokale lister) | 3 |
| Total number of members: | 13 |
Note: On 1 January 1967, Tovdal Municipality became part of Åmli Municipality.

Tovdal heradsstyre 1959–1963
| Party name (in Nynorsk) | Number of representatives |
|---|---|
| Labour Party (Arbeidarpartiet) | 4 |
| Joint List(s) of Non-Socialist Parties (Borgarlege Felleslister) | 5 |
| Local List(s) (Lokale lister) | 4 |
| Total number of members: | 13 |

Tovdal heradsstyre 1955–1959
| Party name (in Nynorsk) | Number of representatives |
|---|---|
| Labour Party (Arbeidarpartiet) | 4 |
| Farmers' Party (Bondepartiet) | 4 |
| Liberal Party (Venstre) | 3 |
| Local List(s) (Lokale lister) | 2 |
| Total number of members: | 13 |

Tovdal heradsstyre 1951–1955
| Party name (in Nynorsk) | Number of representatives |
|---|---|
| Labour Party (Arbeidarpartiet) | 4 |
| Farmers' Party (Bondepartiet) | 4 |
| Liberal Party (Venstre) | 4 |
| Total number of members: | 12 |

Tovdal heradsstyre 1947–1951
| Party name (in Nynorsk) | Number of representatives |
|---|---|
| Labour Party (Arbeidarpartiet) | 5 |
| Farmers' Party (Bondepartiet) | 4 |
| Liberal Party (Venstre) | 3 |
| Total number of members: | 12 |

Tovdal heradsstyre 1945–1947
| Party name (in Nynorsk) | Number of representatives |
|---|---|
| Local List(s) (Lokale lister) | 12 |
| Total number of members: | 12 |

Tovdal heradsstyre 1937–1941*
| Party name (in Nynorsk) | Number of representatives |
|---|---|
| Labour Party (Arbeidarpartiet) | 6 |
| Joint list of the Farmers' Party (Bondepartiet) and the Liberal Party (Venstre) | 6 |
| Total number of members: | 12 |
Note: Due to the German occupation of Norway during World War II, no elections were held for new municipal councils until after the war ended in 1945.

=== Mayors ===
The mayor (Nynorsk: ordførar) of Tovdal Municipality was the political leader of the municipality and the chairperson of the municipal council. The following people have held this position:

- 1908–1910: Ole Olsen Ramse
- 1911–1913: Ole Eivindsen Monen
- 1914–1916: Sveinung Oland
- 1917–1922: Ånund Olsen Austenå
- 1923–1925: Ole Olsen Ramse
- 1926–1931: Ånund Olsen Austenå
- 1932–1940: Olav Olsen Ramse, Jr. (V)
- 1941–1945: Ånund Olsen Austenå (NS)
- 1945–1948: Olav Olsen Ramse, Jr. (V)
- 1948–1951: Olav T. Ramse (Bp)
- 1951–1957: Olav Olsen Ramse, Jr. (V)
- 1958–1959: Olav T. Ramse (Bp)
- 1959–1964: Olav Olsen Ramse, Jr. (V)
- 1964–1966: Olav T. Ramse (Sp)

== See also ==
- List of former municipalities of Norway
