= Skjeggedal =

Skjeggedal may refer to:

== Places ==
- Skjeggedal, Agder, a village area in Åmli municipality in Agder county, Norway
- Skjeggedal, Vestland, a village in Ullensvang municipality in Vestland county, Norway
