= Jonas Alaska =

Norwegian singer (born 1988)

Background information
- Born: Jonas Aslaksen; 3 April 1988; Åmli Municipality, Norway
- Genre: Acoustic music
- Instruments: Vocals; guitar
- Years active: 2011–current

Jonas Alaska (born 3 April 1988), real name Jonas Aslaksen, is a Norwegian singer and songwriter. He won a Spellemannprisen award in 2012.

== Biography ==
Hailing from Åmli Municipality, Aslaksen studied at the Liverpool Institute for Performing Arts from 2008 to 2011. In 2011 he scored his first hit single with "In the Backseat" and released his first solo album called Jonas Alaska. The album peaked at 5th on VG-lista, with 24 charting weeks in total.

Alaska was nominated for three Spellemannprisen awards in 2012—"male artist of the year", "songwriter of the year" and "newcomer of the year"—winning the latter. In March 2013 he released his second album If Only As A Ghost, produced by Kjartan Kristiansen, which immediately entered 4th spot on the VG-lista chart. The review in the newspaper VG was however negative, with a dice throw of 3 (out of 6), elaborating about the song arrangements: "They have no uniqueness, but bear more of a mark that Alaska wants to be a much older man than he actually is. An older, well-read and American man". Universitas labelled most of the album "forgettable". Adresseavisen printed a positive review, a dice throw of 5, as the reviewer called Alaska "brilliant pop music". The same score was found in Gaffa.

In 2015 his third studio album, Younger was published by Columbia Records, the sound differing from the previous as the genre changed from blues or acoustic to indie rock. The reviews were chiefly positive, with full score given by Gaffa and a dice throw of 5 issued by several newspapers. Vårt Land did however call the album "dangerously close on bordering cliché".

Alaska did however release acoustic versions of Younger – Side 1 and Younger – Side 2 in 2015. He followed with several albums; Fear Is A Demon (2017), Live at Parkteatret 2016 (2018), Roof Came Down (2020) and Girl (2021).

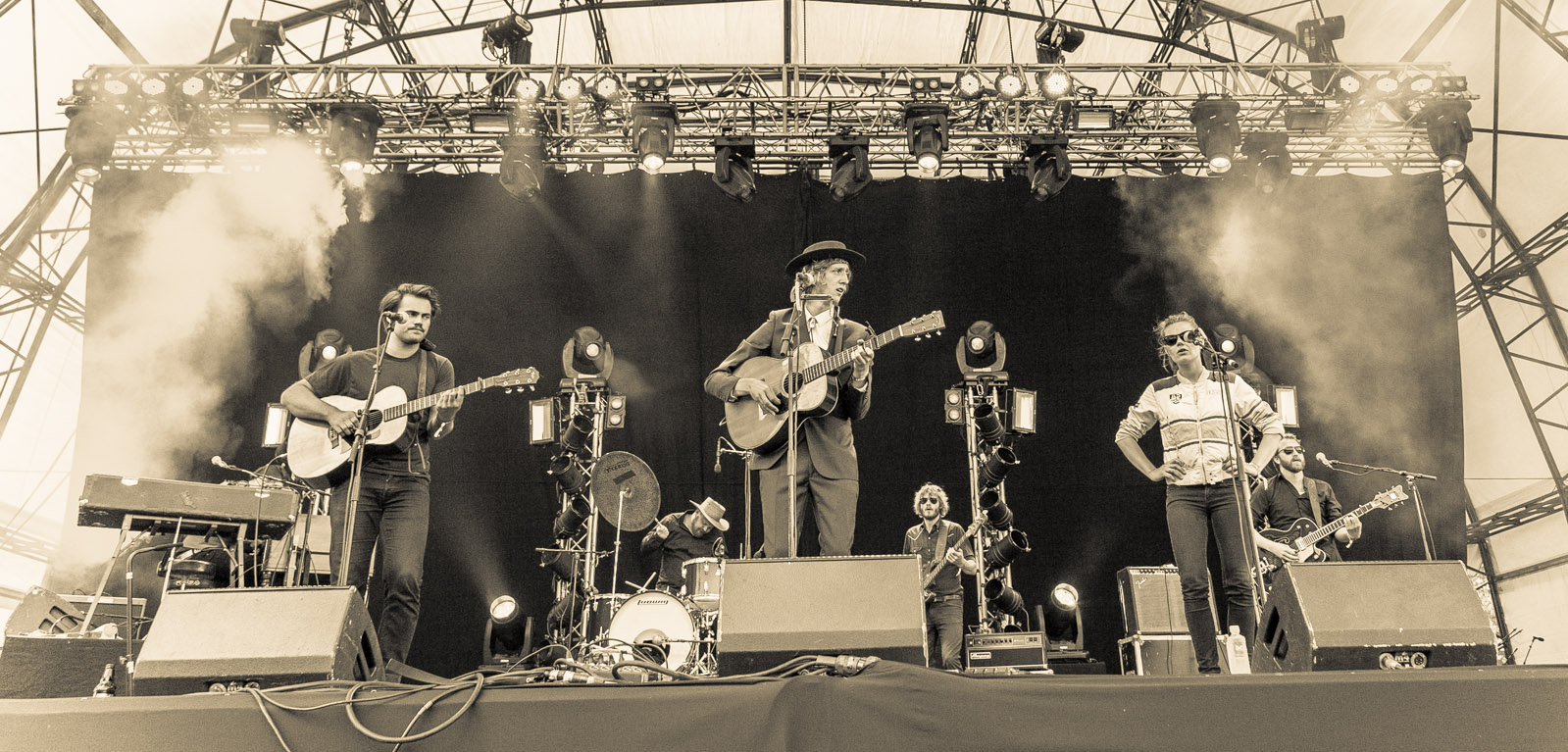
Jonas Alaska in 2012 at Hovefestivalen
