= Vehus =

Village in Åmli Municipality, Norway

- Village
- Interactive map of Vehus
- Coordinates: 58.6830°N 08.4050°E
- Country: Norway
- Region: Southern Norway
- County: Agder
- District: Østre Agder
- Municipality: Åmli Municipality
- Elevation: 235 m (771 ft)
- Time zone: UTC+01:00 (CET)
  - Summer (DST): UTC+02:00 (CEST)
- Post Code: 4869 Dølemo

Vehus is a village in Åmli Municipality in Agder county, Norway. The village is located just east of the river Nidelva, about 5.5 kilometres (3.4 mi) south of the village of Dølemo.
