= Engvald Bakkan =

Norwegian writer (1897–1982)

- Born: 20 August 1897; Aamli Municipality, Norway
- Died: 3 July 1982 (aged 84)
- Education: Pharmacist
- Occupations: Novelist, children's writer
- Awards: Gyldendal's Endowment (1953)

Engvald Bakkan (20 August 1897 – 3 July 1982) was a Norwegian pharmacist, novelist and children's writer.

== Biography ==
Bakkan was born at Aamli Municipality in Nedenes county. He graduated as a pharmacist in 1923. During his career, he lived and worked at Stavanger and Bryne; from 1955 at the Ørnen apotek in Stavanger.

He wrote 11 books: five novels; four short stories and two children's books. Among his best-known works is the novel trilogy from the 18th century, Krossen er din, Gjenom fossane and Regnbogen i toreskya, published between 1947 and 1952. He was awarded the Gyldendal's Endowment in 1953.
