= Askland =

Village in Åmli Municipality, Norway

- Village
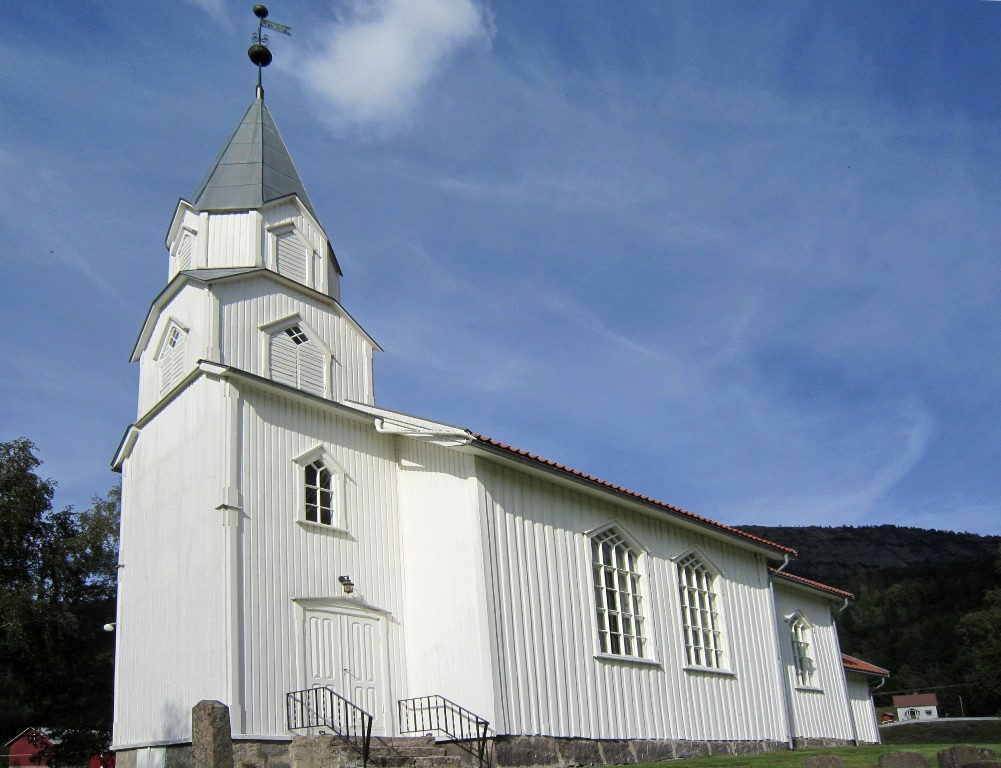
- View of the village church
- Interactive map of Askland
- Coordinates: 58.8726°N 08.3019°E
- Country: Norway
- Region: Southern Norway
- County: Agder
- District: Østre Agder
- Municipality: Åmli Municipality
- Elevation: 221 m (725 ft)
- Time zone: UTC+01:00 (CET)
  - Summer (DST): UTC+02:00 (CEST)
- Post Code: 4865 Åmli

Askland is a village in Åmli Municipality in Agder county, Norway. The village is located in the Gjøvdal valley, just north of the river Gjøv. The village of Homdrom lies about 9 kilometres (5.6 mi) to the southeast and the municipal centre of Åmli lies about 20 kilometres (12 mi) to the southeast. Gjøvdal Church is located in Askland.

== History ==
From 1908 until 1960, the village was part of Gjøvdal Municipality which had Askland as its administrative centre.
