= Åmli Municipality =

Municipality in Agder, Norway

Åmli Municipality Åmli kommune
- Municipality
- Aamli herred (historic name); Omlid herred (historic name)
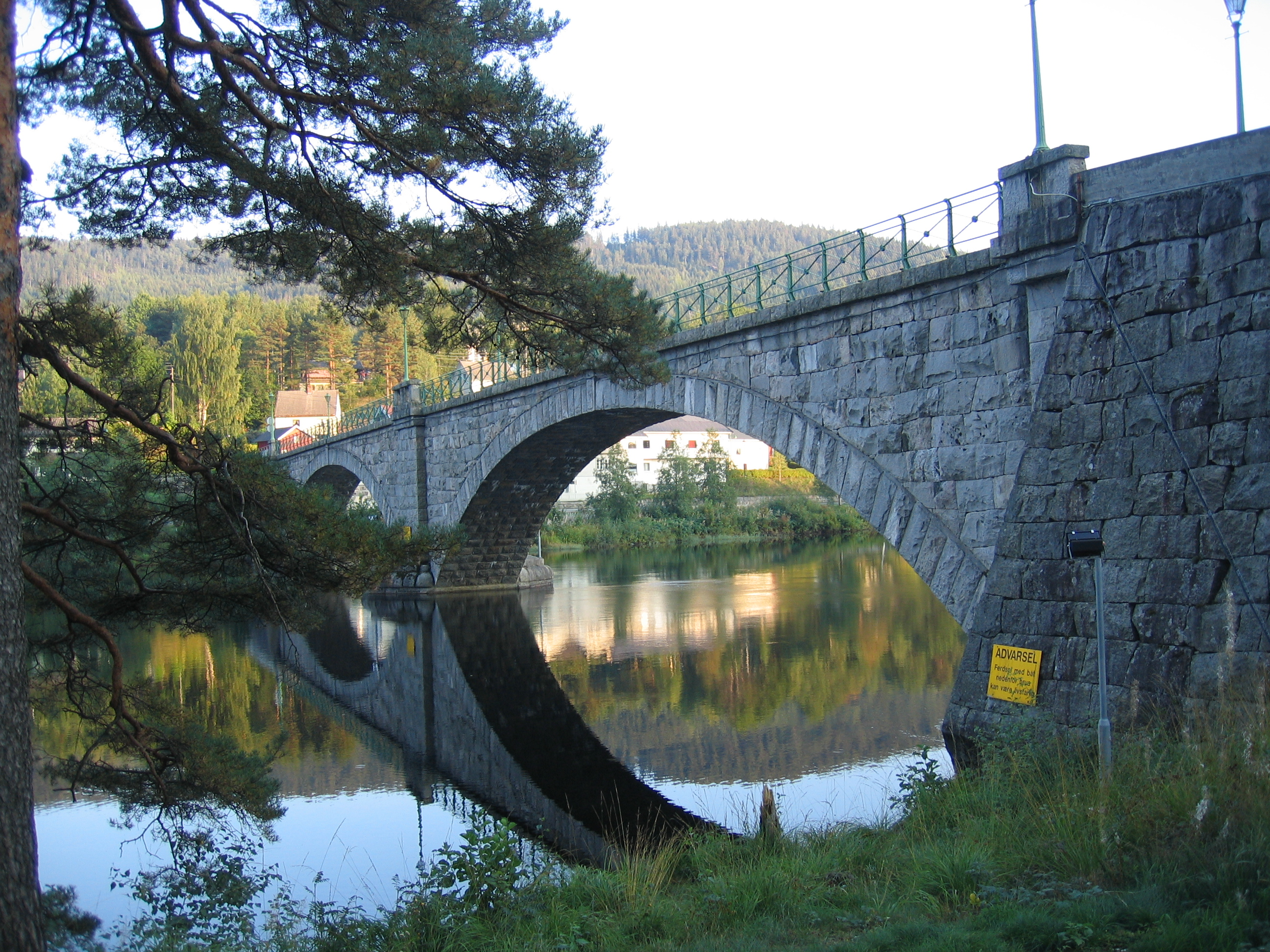
- View of the Nidelva river in Åmli

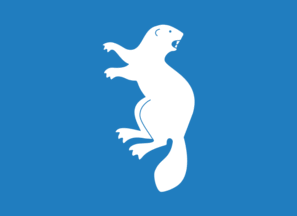
- Flag Coat of arms

- Agder within Norway

- Åmli within Agder
- Coordinates: 58°47′53″N 08°22′9″E
- Country: Norway
- County: Agder
- District: Sørlandet
- Established: 1 Jan 1838
  - Created as: Formannskapsdistrikt
- Administrative centre: Åmli

Government
  - Mayor (2023): Hans Fredrik Tangen (Ap)

Area
  - Total: 1,130.60 km^{2} (436.53 sq mi)
  - Land: 1,058.42 km^{2} (408.66 sq mi)
  - Water: 72.18 km^{2} (27.87 sq mi) 6.4%
  - Rank: #98 in Norway
- Highest elevation: 929.27 m (3,048.8 ft)

Population (2026)
  - Total: 1,805
  - Rank: #295 in Norway
  - Density: 1.7/km^{2} (4.4/sq mi)
  - Change (10 years): ▼ −2.3%
- Demonym: Åmling

Official language
  - Norwegian form: Nynorsk
- Time zone: UTC+01:00 (CET)
  - Summer (DST): UTC+02:00 (CEST)
- ISO 3166 code: NO-4217
- Website: Official website

Åmli is a municipality in Agder county, Norway. It is located in the traditional region of Sørlandet. The main population centre and administrative center is the village of Åmli which lies along the river Nidelva. Other villages in the municipality include Askland, Dølemo, Eppeland, Flaten, Hillestad, Homdrom, Lauveik, Nelaug, Øvre Ramse, Skjeggedal, Tveit, Vehus, and Ytre Ramse.

The 1,130.6-square-kilometre (436.5 sq mi) municipality is the 98th largest by area out of the 357 municipalities in Norway. Åmli Municipality is the 295th most populous municipality in Norway with a population of 1,805. The municipality's population density is 1.7 inhabitants per square kilometre (4.4/sq mi) and its population has decreased by 2.3% over the previous 10-year period.

== General information ==
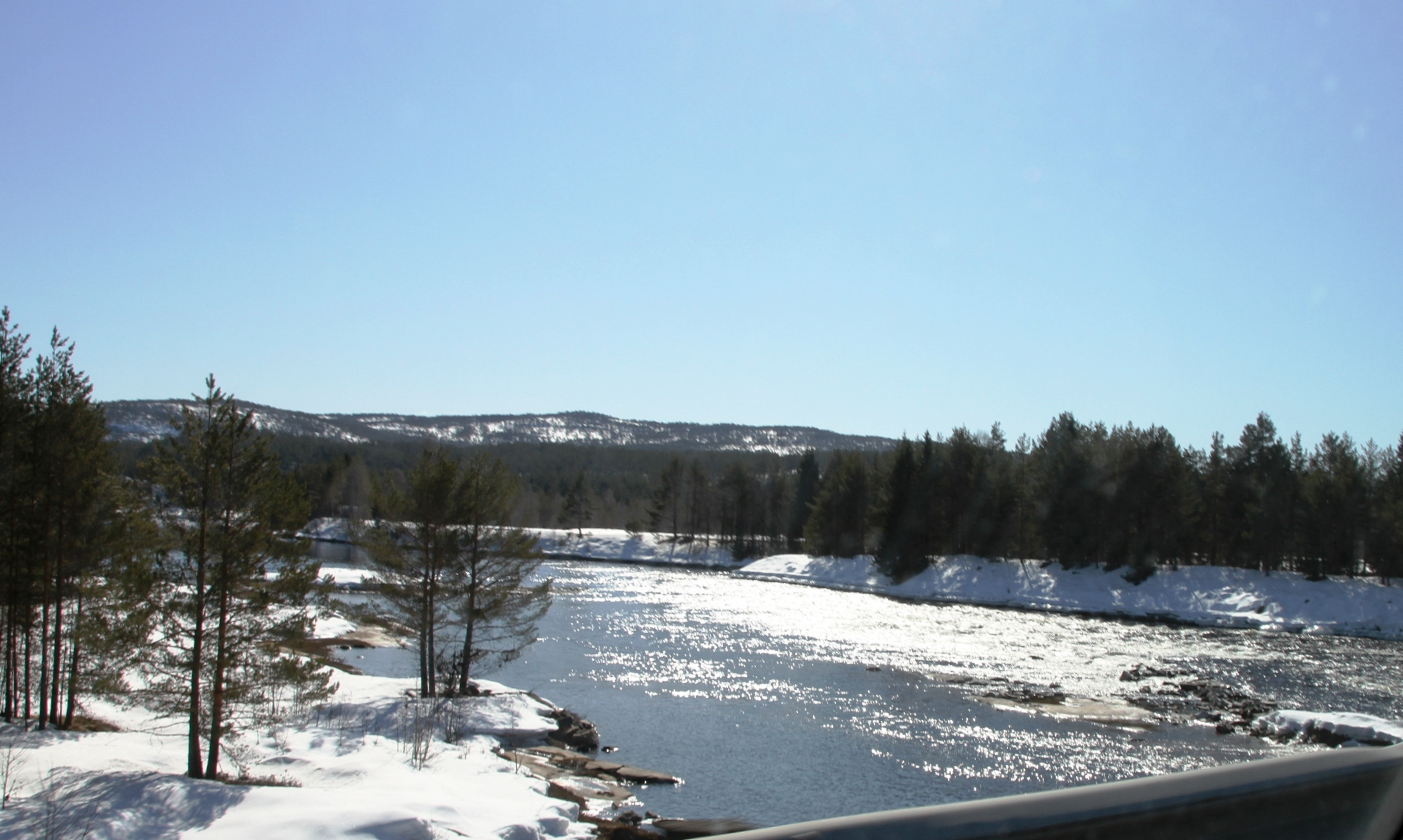
View of the river Nidelva

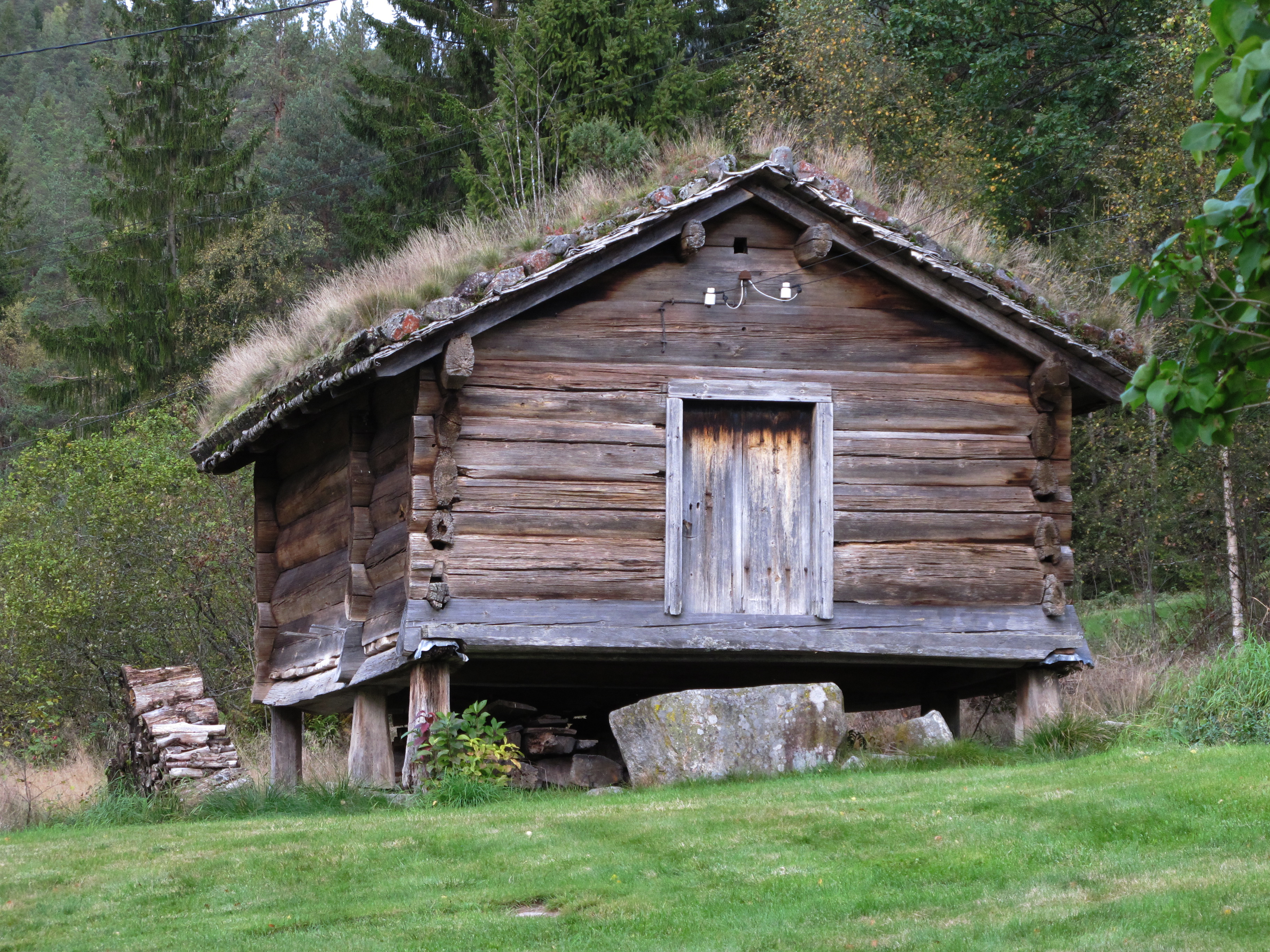
Old Stolpehus in the Tovdal valley

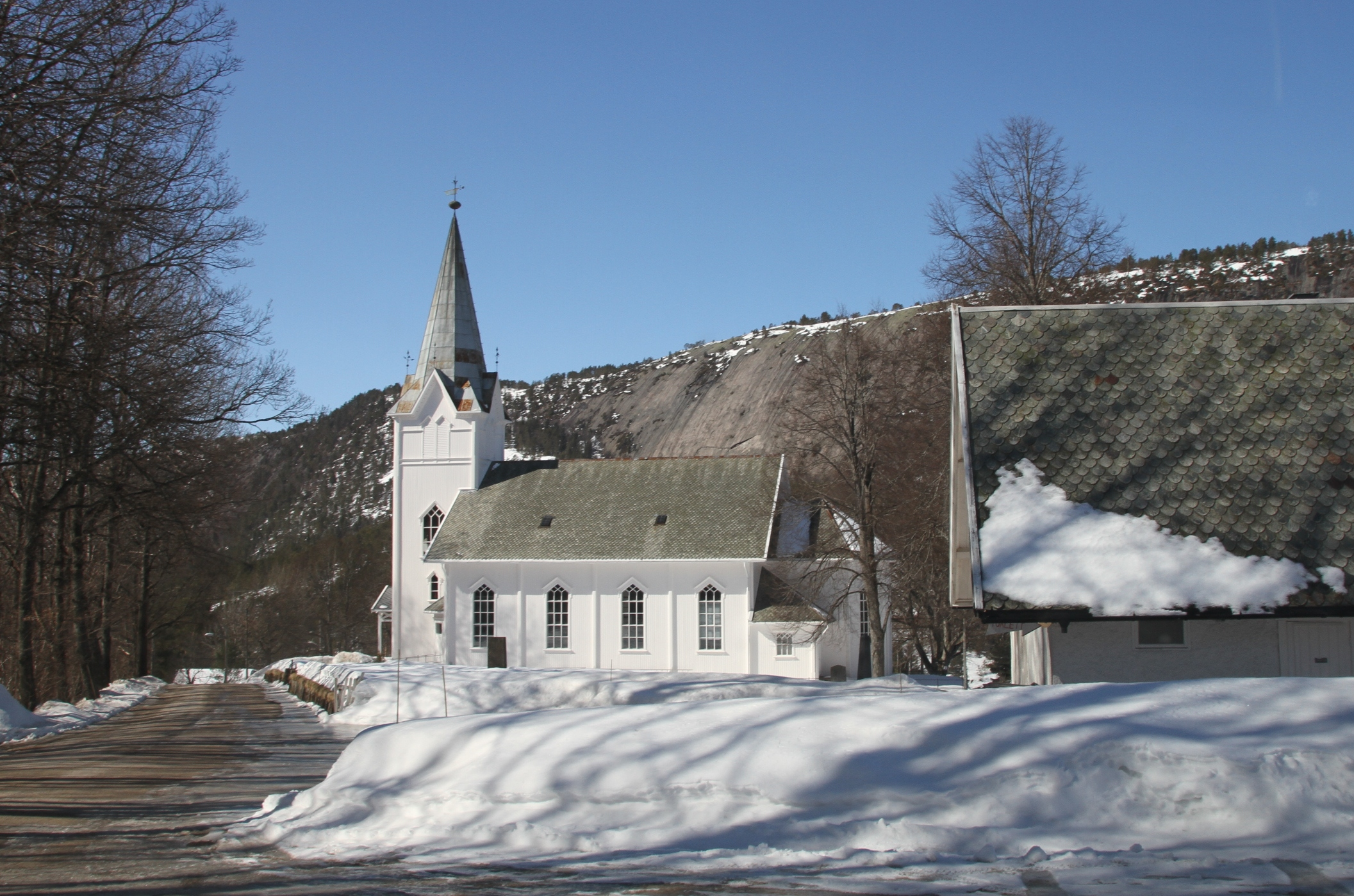
Åmli Church beneath a large mountainside

=== Administrative history ===
The parish of Omlid (later spelled "Aamli" or "Åmli") was established as a municipality on 1 January 1838 (see formannskapsdistrikt law). In 1876, Omlid Municipality was divided as follows: the southern district (population: 663) became the new Mykland Municipality and the northern district (population: 2,564) continued as a smaller Omlid Municipality.

On 1 January 1908, Aamli Municipality was divided into three municipalities as follows:

- the northern district surrounding the Gjøv river valley (population: 590) became the new Gjevedal Municipality
- the western district surrounding the Tovdalselva river valley (population: 389) became the new Lille Topdal Municipality
- the eastern district (population: 2,024) continued as a much smaller Aamli Municipality

During the 1960s, there were many municipal mergers across Norway due to the work of the Schei Committee. On 1 January 1960, Åmli Municipality (population: 1,947) and Gjøvdal Municipality (population: 362) were merged to form an enlarged Åmli Municipality.

On 1 January 1962, the Espestølsgrenda area (pop: 7) was transferred from Åmli Municipality (and Aust-Agder county) to the neighboring Nissedal Municipality (in Telemark county). On 1 January 1965, several uninhabited areas (the Espestøl, Reinefoss, and Espestølstykket farms) were also transferred Åmli Municipality (and Aust-Agder county) to the neighboring Nissedal Municipality (in Telemark county).

On 1 January 1967, Åmli Municipality (population: 2,050) and Tovdal Municipality (population: 161) were merged to form an enlarged Åmli Municipality. On 1 January 1968, the Flateland farm (population: 6) was transferred from Åmli Municipality to the neighboring Froland Municipality.

In 2020, there were many municipal and county mergers across Norway due to the work of the Solberg cabinet. Historically, this municipality was part of the old Aust-Agder county. On 1 January 2020, the municipality became a part of the newly-formed Agder county (after Aust-Agder and Vest-Agder counties were merged).

=== Name ===
The municipality (originally the parish) is named after the old Åmli farm (Old Norse: Almlíð) since the first Åmli Church was built there. The first element is almr which means "elm tree" or "elm wood". The last element is hlíð which means "slope" or "hillside". Historically, the name was historically spelled Omlid before being changed to Aamli.

On 21 December 1917, a royal resolution enacted the 1917 Norwegian language reforms. Prior to this change, the name was spelled Aamli with the digraph "Aa", and after this reform, the name was spelled Åmli, using the letter Å instead.

=== Coat of arms ===
The coat of arms was granted on 23 October 1987. The official blazon is "Azure, a beaver rampant regardant argent" (Norwegian: På blå grunn ein oppreist sølv bever med hovudet vendt bakover). This means the arms have a blue field (background) and the charge is a beaver. The beaver has a tincture of argent which means it is commonly colored white or gray, but if it is made out of metal, then silver is used. The beaver was chosen because the Åmli area was one of the few remaining beaver habitats in Europe. By the late 19th century, only about 100 beavers were left in Europe, mostly in the Åmli area. They were protected and after World War I, the beavers from this area have been used to help re-populate other areas in Europe where the beaver had gone extinct in the wild. The arms were designed by Odd Einar Ufsvatn who won a competition for designing the arms. The municipal flag has the same design as the coat of arms.

=== Churches ===
The Church of Norway has two parishes (sokn) within Åmli Municipality. It is part of the Aust-Nedenes prosti (deanery) in the Diocese of Agder og Telemark.

Churches in Åmli Municipality
Parish (sokn)	Church name	Location of the church	Year built
Gjøvdal	Gjøvdal Church	Askland	1803
Åmli	Tovdal Church	Hillestad	1820
Åmli	Åmli Church	Åmli	1909

== Geography ==
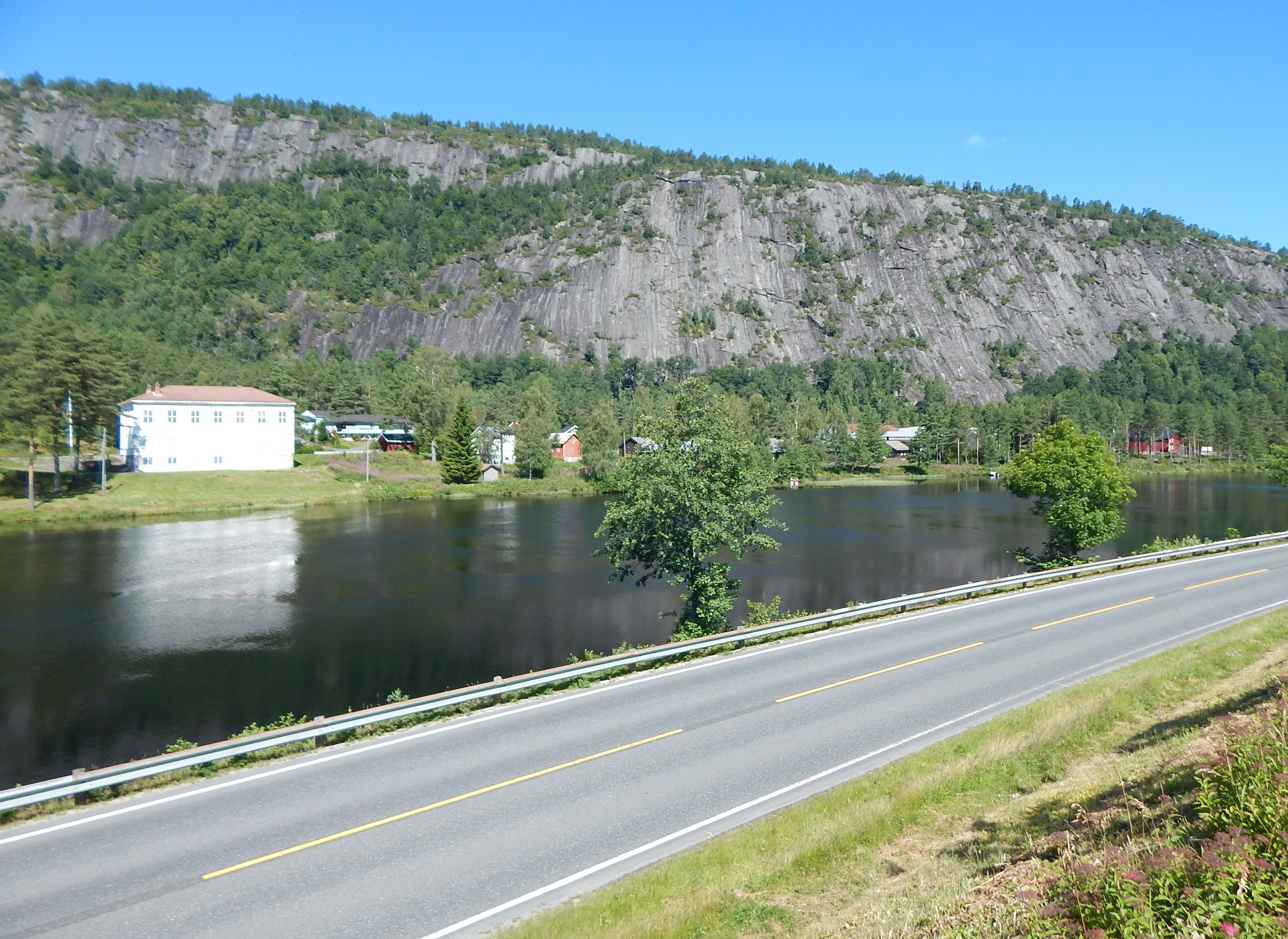
Road Rv41 in Åmli in July

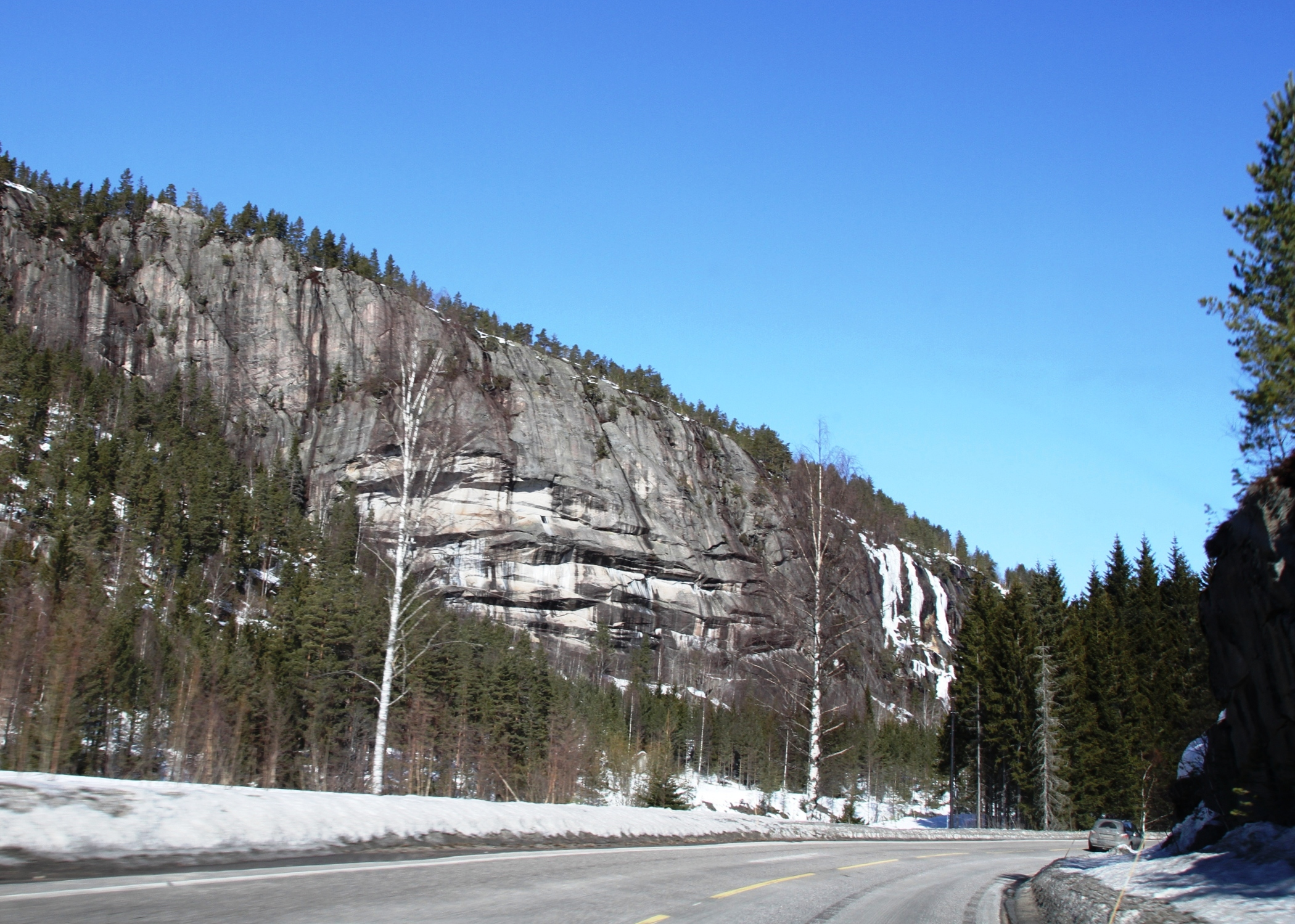
Lifjellet mountain in March with a frozen waterfall

Åmli Municipality is located in northern Agder county. It is bordered on the north by Fyresdal Municipality and Nissedal Municipality (in Telemark county), on the east by Vegårshei Municipality, on the south by Froland Municipality, and on the west by Bygland Municipality.

The most densely populated area is around the municipal center of Åmli, which lies on the banks of the river Nidelva. The village has about 682 residents (in 2017). Side valleys which join the main valley include Gjøvdal and Tovdal. The rivers Nidelva and Tovdalselva flow through the valleys.

In the southern part of the municipality the Sørlandsbanen railway line passes through the area, stopping at the Nelaug Station. The largest villages in Åmli include Dølemo, Nelaug, Hillestad, and Askland. The rest of the population is scattered among the valleys.

The Åmli hills are wooded and typically range from 700 to 800 metres (2,300 to 2,600 ft) above sea level. The highest point in the municipality is the 929.27-metre (3,048.8 ft) tall mountain Trongedalsnuten which lies between the Tovdal and Gjøvdal valleys. Several lakes are located in Åmli including Måvatn, Nasvatn, and Nelaug.

There are several protected areas, for instance, the Årdalen nature reserve, bordering on the Rukkevatn nature reserve, and the Furubuhei marsh reserve, provide approximately 43 square kilometres (17 sq mi) of nature reserves.

=== Climate ===
Situated inland in Agder county, Nelaug has a humid continental climate or temperate oceanic climate, depending on winter threshold used (0 °C (32 °F) or −3 °C (27 °F). The all-time high is 32 °C (90 °F) set 10 August 1975, a month with 8 days above 30 °C (86 °F). The warmest month on record is July 2018 with mean 20.8 °C (69.4 °F). The all-time low is −35 °C (−31 °F) recorded 10 February 1966.

Climate data for Nelaug 1991-2020 (142 m)
Month	Jan	Feb	Mar	Apr	May	Jun	Jul	Aug	Sep	Oct	Nov	Dec	Year
Mean daily maximum °C (°F)	1.5 (34.7)	2.2 (36.0)	5.6 (42.1)	10.8 (51.4)	16.3 (61.3)	20 (68)	22.2 (72.0)	20.9 (69.6)	16.1 (61.0)	10.3 (50.5)	5.4 (41.7)	2.1 (35.8)	11.1 (52.0)
Daily mean °C (°F)	−1.6 (29.1)	−1.5 (29.3)	1.2 (34.2)	5.5 (41.9)	10.6 (51.1)	14.5 (58.1)	16.7 (62.1)	15.7 (60.3)	11.7 (53.1)	6.7 (44.1)	2.6 (36.7)	−0.9 (30.4)	6.8 (44.2)
Mean daily minimum °C (°F)	−4.5 (23.9)	−4.6 (23.7)	−2.8 (27.0)	0.8 (33.4)	5.1 (41.2)	9.3 (48.7)	11.7 (53.1)	11.2 (52.2)	8.1 (46.6)	3.7 (38.7)	0.1 (32.2)	−3.7 (25.3)	2.9 (37.2)
Average precipitation mm (inches)	148 (5.8)	92 (3.6)	83 (3.3)	68 (2.7)	83 (3.3)	92 (3.6)	95 (3.7)	134 (5.3)	136 (5.4)	161 (6.3)	164 (6.5)	138 (5.4)	1,394 (54.9)
Average precipitation days (≥ 1.0 mm)	14	11	10	9	10	10	10	11	11	13	14	14	137
Source 1: Yr.no Nelaug statistics
Source 2: Noaa WMO averages 91-2020 Norway

== Government ==
Åmli Municipality is responsible for primary education (through 10th grade), outpatient health services, senior citizen services, welfare and other social services, zoning, economic development, and municipal roads and utilities. The municipality is governed by a municipal council of directly elected representatives. The mayor is indirectly elected by a vote of the municipal council. The municipality is under the jurisdiction of the Agder District Court and the Agder Court of Appeal.

=== Municipal council ===
The municipal council (Kommunestyre) of Åmli Municipality is made up of 17 representatives that are elected to four-year terms. The tables below show the current and historical composition of the council by political party.

Åmli kommunestyre 2023–2027
Party name (in Nynorsk)	Number of representatives
Labour Party (Arbeidarpartiet)	7
Conservative Party (Høgre)	3
Red Party (Raudt)	1
Centre Party (Senterpartiet)	6
Total number of members:	17

Åmli kommunestyre 2019–2023
Party name (in Nynorsk)	Number of representatives
Labour Party (Arbeidarpartiet)	5
Conservative Party (Høgre)	1
Christian Democratic Party (Kristeleg Folkeparti)	2
Centre Party (Senterpartiet)	9
Total number of members:	17
Note: Originally, after the election, there were 2 members from Høgre and 8 members of the Senterpartiet. In 2021, one member switched parties from Høgre to the Arbeidarpartiet. In 2022, another member switched parties from Arbeidarpartiet to Senterpartiet.

Åmli kommunestyre 2015–2019
Party name (in Nynorsk)	Number of representatives
Labour Party (Arbeidarpartiet)	7
Conservative Party (Høgre)	2
Christian Democratic Party (Kristeleg Folkeparti)	2
Centre Party (Senterpartiet)	6
Total number of members:	17

Åmli kommunestyre 2011–2015
Party name (in Nynorsk)	Number of representatives
Labour Party (Arbeidarpartiet)	6
Progress Party (Framstegspartiet)	1
Conservative Party (Høgre)	3
Christian Democratic Party (Kristeleg Folkeparti)	3
Centre Party (Senterpartiet)	4
Total number of members:	17

Åmli kommunestyre 2007–2011
Party name (in Nynorsk)	Number of representatives
Labour Party (Arbeidarpartiet)	7
Progress Party (Framstegspartiet)	2
Conservative Party (Høgre)	1
Centre Party (Senterpartiet)	7
Total number of members:	17

Åmli kommunestyre 2003–2007
Party name (in Nynorsk)	Number of representatives
Labour Party (Arbeidarpartiet)	7
Progress Party (Framstegspartiet)	2
Conservative Party (Høgre)	2
Christian Democratic Party (Kristeleg Folkeparti)	2
Centre Party (Senterpartiet)	6
Socialist Left Party (Sosialistisk Venstreparti)	2
Total number of members:	21

Åmli kommunestyre 1999–2003
Party name (in Nynorsk)	Number of representatives
Labour Party (Arbeidarpartiet)	10
Progress Party (Framstegspartiet)	1
Conservative Party (Høgre)	1
Christian Democratic Party (Kristeleg Folkeparti)	2
Centre Party (Senterpartiet)	5
Socialist Left Party (Sosialistisk Venstreparti)	2
Total number of members:	21

Åmli kommunestyre 1995–1999
Party name (in Nynorsk)	Number of representatives
Labour Party (Arbeidarpartiet)	10
Conservative Party (Høgre)	2
Christian Democratic Party (Kristeleg Folkeparti)	2
Centre Party (Senterpartiet)	5
Socialist Left Party (Sosialistisk Venstreparti)	2
Total number of members:	21

Åmli kommunestyre 1991–1995
Party name (in Nynorsk)	Number of representatives
Labour Party (Arbeidarpartiet)	11
Conservative Party (Høgre)	2
Christian Democratic Party (Kristeleg Folkeparti)	1
Centre Party (Senterpartiet)	5
Socialist Left Party (Sosialistisk Venstreparti)	2
Total number of members:	21

Åmli kommunestyre 1987–1991
Party name (in Nynorsk)	Number of representatives
Labour Party (Arbeidarpartiet)	14
Conservative Party (Høgre)	2
Christian Democratic Party (Kristeleg Folkeparti)	1
Centre Party (Senterpartiet)	3
Socialist Left Party (Sosialistisk Venstreparti)	1
Total number of members:	21

Åmli kommunestyre 1983–1987
Party name (in Nynorsk)	Number of representatives
Labour Party (Arbeidarpartiet)	12
Progress Party (Framstegspartiet)	1
Socialist Left Party (Sosialistisk Venstreparti)	1
Joint list of the Conservative Party (Høgre), Christian Democratic Party (Kristeleg Folkeparti), and Centre Party (Senterpartiet)	7
Total number of members:	21

Åmli kommunestyre 1979–1983
Party name (in Nynorsk)	Number of representatives
Labour Party (Arbeidarpartiet)	12
Joint list of the Conservative Party (Høgre), Christian Democratic Party (Kristeleg Folkeparti), New People's Party (Nye Folkepartiet), Centre Party (Senterpartiet), and Liberal Party (Venstre)	9
Total number of members:	21

Åmli kommunestyre 1975–1979
Party name (in Nynorsk)	Number of representatives
Labour Party (Arbeidarpartiet)	8
Socialist Left Party (Sosialistisk Venstreparti)	3
Joint list of the Centre Party (Senterpartiet), Christian Democratic Party (Kristeleg Folkeparti), and New People's Party (Nye Folkepartiet)	10
Total number of members:	21

Åmli kommunestyre 1971–1975
Party name (in Nynorsk)	Number of representatives
Labour Party (Arbeidarpartiet)	13
Christian Democratic Party (Kristeleg Folkeparti)	2
Centre Party (Senterpartiet)	4
Liberal Party (Venstre)	2
Total number of members:	21

Åmli kommunestyre 1967–1971
Party name (in Nynorsk)	Number of representatives
Labour Party (Arbeidarpartiet)	13
Christian Democratic Party (Kristeleg Folkeparti)	1
Centre Party (Senterpartiet)	4
Socialist People's Party (Sosialistisk Folkeparti)	1
Liberal Party (Venstre)	2
Total number of members:	21

Åmli kommunestyre 1963–1967
Party name (in Nynorsk)	Number of representatives
Labour Party (Arbeidarpartiet)	14
Christian Democratic Party (Kristeleg Folkeparti)	1
Socialist People's Party (Sosialistisk Folkeparti)	1
Joint List(s) of Non-Socialist Parties (Borgarlege Felleslister)	5
Total number of members:	21

Åmli heradsstyre 1959–1963
Party name (in Nynorsk)	Number of representatives
Labour Party (Arbeidarpartiet)	14
Joint List(s) of Non-Socialist Parties (Borgarlege Felleslister)	7
Total number of members:	21

Åmli heradsstyre 1955–1959
Party name (in Nynorsk)	Number of representatives
Labour Party (Arbeidarpartiet)	13
Joint List(s) of Non-Socialist Parties (Borgarlege Felleslister)	4
Total number of members:	17

Åmli heradsstyre 1951–1955
Party name (in Nynorsk)	Number of representatives
Labour Party (Arbeidarpartiet)	12
Farmers' Party (Bondepartiet)	2
Liberal Party (Venstre)	2
Total number of members:	16

Åmli heradsstyre 1947–1951
Party name (in Nynorsk)	Number of representatives
Labour Party (Arbeidarpartiet)	12
Joint List(s) of Non-Socialist Parties (Borgarlege Felleslister)	4
Total number of members:	16

Åmli heradsstyre 1945–1947
Party name (in Nynorsk)	Number of representatives
Labour Party (Arbeidarpartiet)	11
Communist Party (Kommunistiske Parti)	1
Joint List(s) of Non-Socialist Parties (Borgarlege Felleslister)	4
Total number of members:	16

Åmli heradsstyre 1937–1941*
Party name (in Nynorsk)	Number of representatives
Labour Party (Arbeidarpartiet)	11
Farmers' Party (Bondepartiet)	1
Liberal Party (Venstre)	4
Total number of members:	16
Note: Due to the German occupation of Norway during World War II, no elections were held for new municipal councils until after the war ended in 1945.

=== Mayors ===
The mayor (Nynorsk: ordførar) of Åmli Municipality is the political leader of the municipality and the chairperson of the municipal council. The following people have held this position:

- 1838–1838: Terje Gunstensen Gjeveland
- 1839–1853: Iver Anton Rummelhoff
- 1854–1855: Eivind Salvesen Mjaaland
- 1856–1857: Petter Øi
- 1858–1859: Ole Knutsen Tvedt
- 1860–1861: Ommund Syvertsen Mykland
- 1862–1863: Even P. Askeland
- 1864–1866: Ommund Syvertsen Mykland
- 1867–1868: Nære O. Ramse
- 1869–1871: Ole Knutsen Tvedt
- 1872–1877: Peder Samuel Beylegaard
- 1878–1879: Gunstein P. Tviland
- 1880–1881: Ommund Omland
- 1882–1890: Engvald Hansen
- 1891–1892: Ommund Omland
- 1893–1894: Kjetil Øi
- 1895–1897: Ommund Omland
- 1898–1901: Elling Øi
- 1902–1910: Aslak Kateraas (V)
- 1911–1919: Elling Øi
- 1920–1925: Aslak Kateraas (V)
- 1926–1928: Peder Jensen
- 1929–1934: Jørgen Tønnesen
- 1935–1940: Olav Nylund
- 1941–1941: Jørgen Tønnesen (NS)
- 1942–1945: Tallak Dale (NS)
- 1945–1947: Gunnar Bakken
- 1947–1964: Jens Seljås
- 1965–1971: Gjeruld Homdal
- 1971–1971: Gunnar Skogby
- 1972–1975: John S. Eppeland
- 1975–1979: Karl Johan Tveiten (KrF)
- 1979–1983: Gunnar Halvorsen (Ap)
- 1983–1991: Sverre Johan Kløvfjell (Ap)
- 1991–1995: Tellef Harstveit (Ap)
- 1995–1999: Sverre Johan Kløvfjell (Ap)
- 1999–2003: Tellef Harstveit (Ap)
- 2003–2011: Tellef Olstad (Sp)
- 2011–2019: Reidar Saga (Ap)
- 2019–2023: Bjørn Gunnar Baas (Sp)
- 2023–present: Hans Fredrik Tangen (Ap)

== Economy ==
Lumber production in Åmli provides for about 12% of the old Aust-Agder county's total timber production making it the third most import source of timber in Aust-Adger (after Froland and Birkenes). Agriculture, including sheep husbandry, provides a minor contribution to the economy.

Electrical power is generated by a hydroelectric plant at Flatefoss, which regulates the level of the lake, Nelaug.

The newspaper Åmliavisa has been published in Åmli since 2008.

== Transportation ==
The main road through Åmli is the north–south Norwegian National Road 41. Other roads include Norwegian County Road 412, Norwegian County Road 413, and Norwegian County Road 415. There are also two railway lines running through southern Åmli: the main Sørlandsbanen railway line which stops at Nelaug Station and the branch line Arendalsbanen which terminates at Nelaug Station, but also stops at Flaten Station.

== Notable people ==
- Engvald Bakkan (1897 in Åmli – 1982), a pharmacist, novelist, and children's writer
- Olav Kjetilson Nylund (1903 in Åmli – 1957), a politician who was Mayor of Åmli from 1934-1940
- Gunnar Halvorsen (1945–2006), a politician who was Mayor of Åmli from 1979–1983
- Jonas Alaska (born 1988), a musician
