= Hillestad, Agder =

Village in Åmli Municipality, Norway

Hillestad
- Village
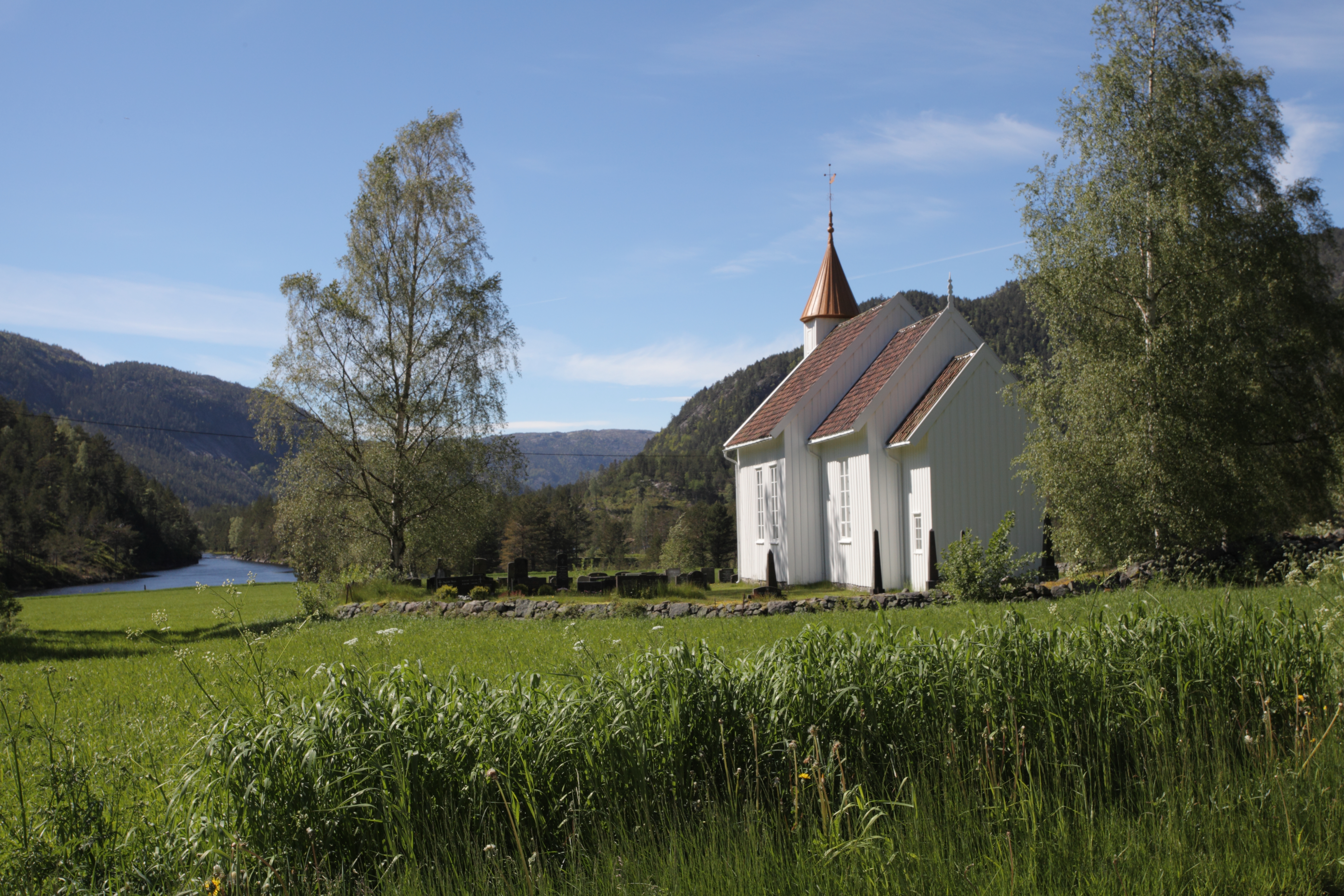
- View of the village church
- Interactive map of Hillestad
- Coordinates: 58.8076°N 08.1762°E
- Country: Norway
- Region: Southern Norway
- County: Agder
- District: Østre Agder
- Municipality: Åmli Municipality
- Elevation: 230 m (750 ft)
- Time zone: UTC+01:00 (CET)
  - Summer (DST): UTC+02:00 (CEST)
- Post Code: 4869 Dølemo

Hillestad is a village in Åmli Municipality in Agder county, Norway. The village is located in the Tovdalselva river valley. It sits about 4 kilometres (2.5 mi) northwest of the village of Øvre Ramse and about 15 kilometres (9.3 mi) northwest of the village of Dølemo. Tovdal Church is located in the village.

== History ==
From 1908 until 1967, Hillestad was the administrative centre of the old Tovdal Municipality.
