= Åmli Church =

Church in Agder, Norway

- Åmli kyrkje
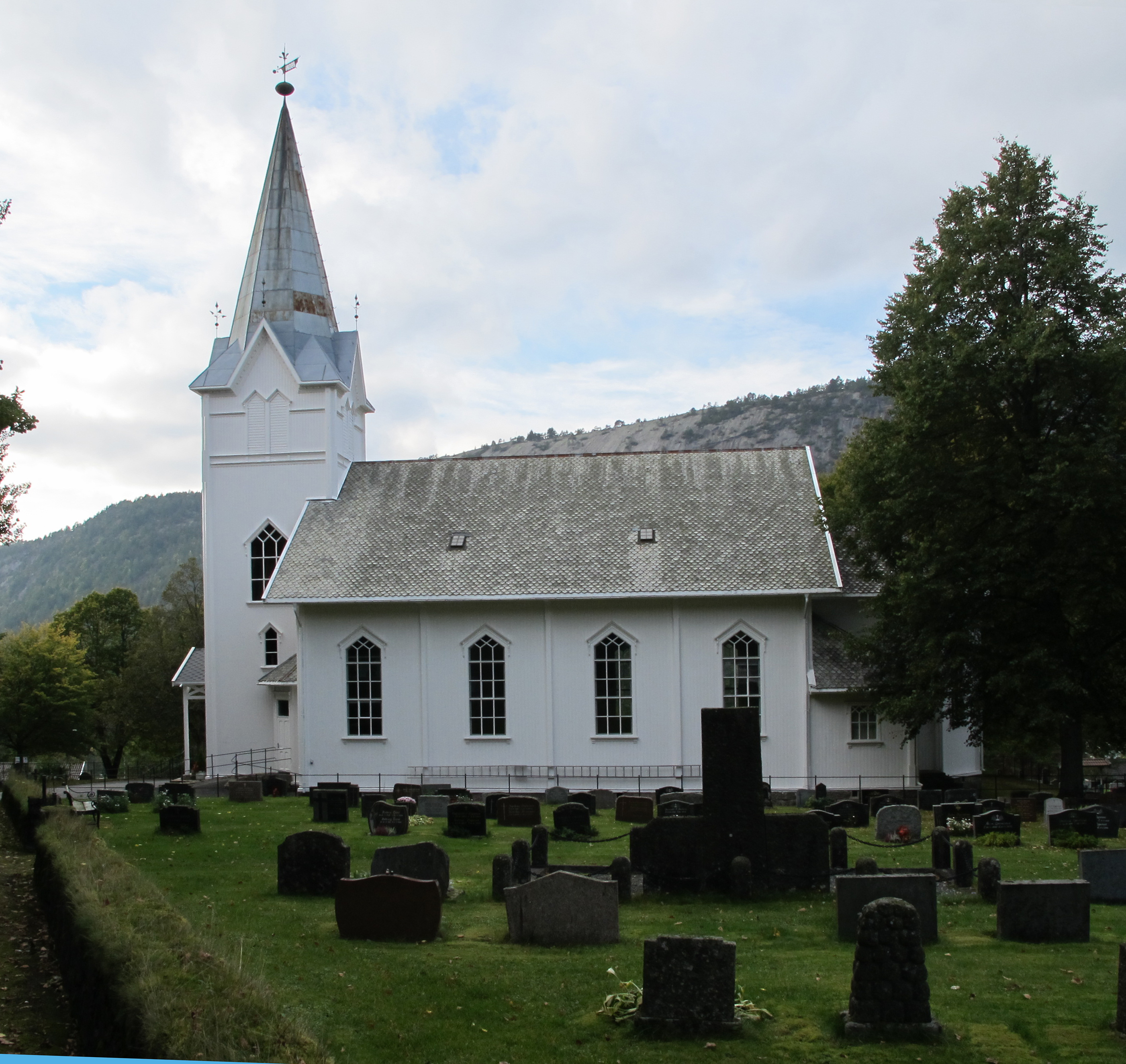
- View of the church
- Åmli Church
- 58.7675°N 08.48775°E
- Location: Åmli Municipality, Agder
- Country: Norway
- Denomination: Church of Norway
- Previous denomination: Catholic Church
- Churchmanship: Evangelical Lutheran

History
- Status: Parish church
- Founded: 13th century
- Consecrated: 18 Nov 1909

Architecture
- Functional status: Active
- Architect: Ludvig Karlsen
- Architectural type: Long church
- Completed: 1909 (117 years ago)

Specifications
- Capacity: 450
- Materials: Wood

Administration
- Diocese: Agder og Telemark
- Deanery: Aust-Nedenes prosti
- Parish: Åmli
- Norwegian Cultural Heritage Site
- Type: Church
- Status: Not protected
- ID: 85966

Åmli Church (Norwegian: Åmli kyrkje) is a parish church of the Church of Norway in Åmli Municipality in Agder county, Norway. It is located in the village of Åmli. It is one of the churches for the Åmli parish which is part of the Aust-Nedenes prosti (deanery) in the Diocese of Agder og Telemark. The white, wooden, neo-Gothic church was built in a long church design in 1909 using plans drawn up by the architect Ludvig Karlsen. The church seats about 450 people.

== History ==
The earliest existing historical records of the church date back to the year 1378, however it was possibly founded during the 13th century. The first church was built about 350 metres (1,150 ft) east of the present site of the church. In 1724, the priest Niels Pedersen purchased all the churches in Åmli prestegjeld when the King sold them during the Norwegian church sale to help pay off his war debts. Over the years, the ownership of the church passed between many different people.

In 1814, this church served as an election church (Norwegian: valgkirke). Together with more than 300 other parish churches across Norway, it was a polling station for elections to the 1814 Norwegian Constituent Assembly which wrote the Constitution of Norway. This was Norway's first national elections. Each church parish was a constituency that elected people called "electors" who later met together in each county to elect the representatives for the assembly that was to meet at Eidsvoll Manor later that year.

In 1818, the church was purchased by the people of the parish. Shortly afterwards, the parish decided to tear down the centuries-old church and build a new one on the same site. In 1826, the new cruciform church was completed. It was consecrated in 1827 by the Bishop Johan Storm Munch. This church was a wooden building with many windows and its exterior was painted white. Nearly 50 years later, it was decided to replace the church again because it was in bad shape. The foundation was failing and the roof was in dire need of repair.

In conjunction with building a new church, it was also decided to move the location of the church about 350 metres (1,150 ft) to the west, much closer to the village of Åmli. Ludvig Karlsen was hired to lead the construction of the new timber-framed church on the new site. The last service in the old church was held on 15 March 1885 and the next day on 16 March 1885, the new church was consecrated by the Bishop Jacob Sverdrup Smitt. Shortly after that, the old church was torn down.

That church only lasted a short time because on 24 March 1907, during the Palm Sunday worship service, the church caught fire and burned down. Soon after, plans were made to rebuild a church on the same site. Tellef Mosbergplassen was hired to lead the construction of the new building which was to be based on the plans for the previous building from 1885. A new church was completed in 1909 and it was consecrated on 18 November 1909. In 2009, there was a small expansion in the entry area of the building.

== Media gallery ==
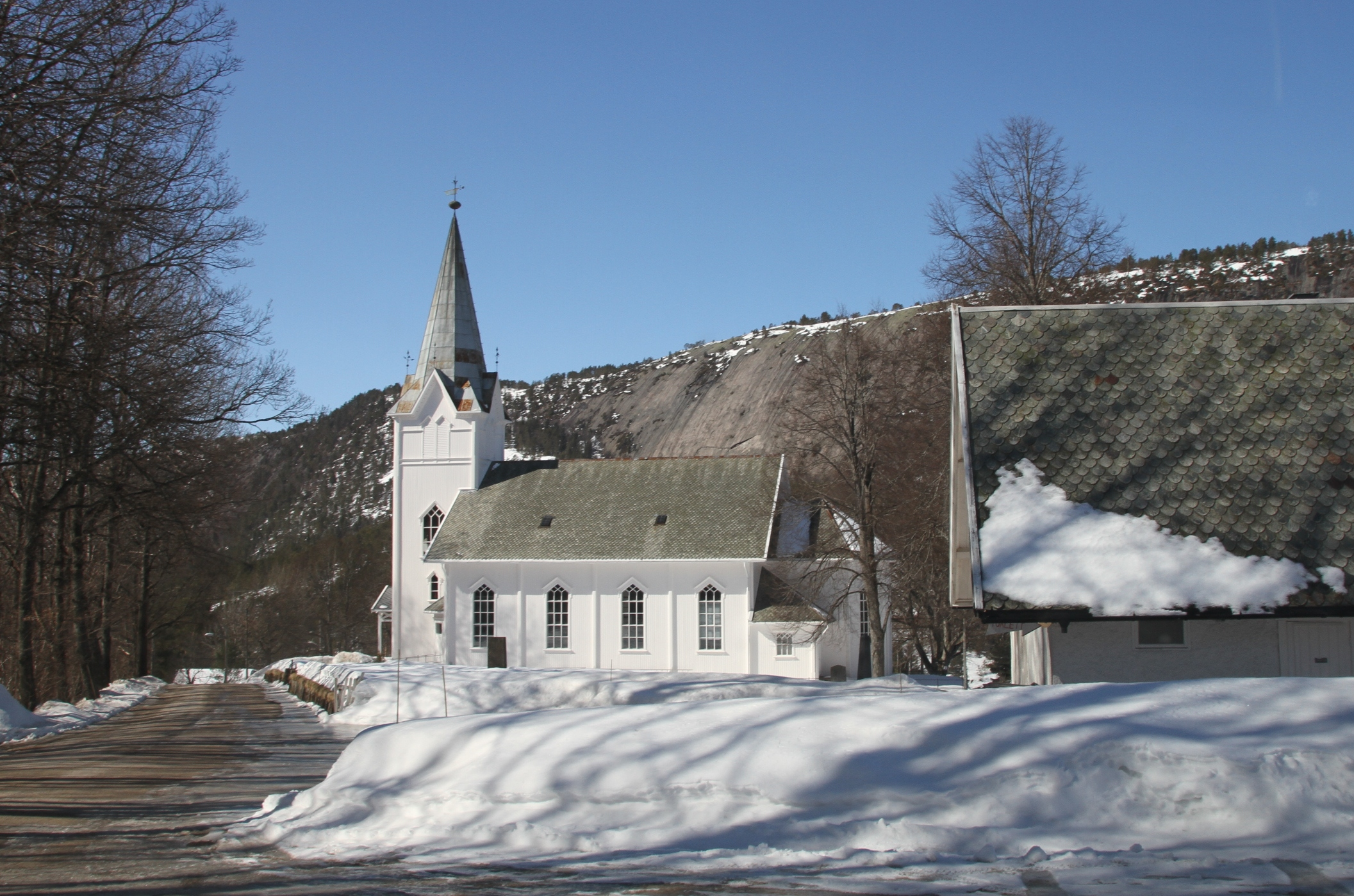

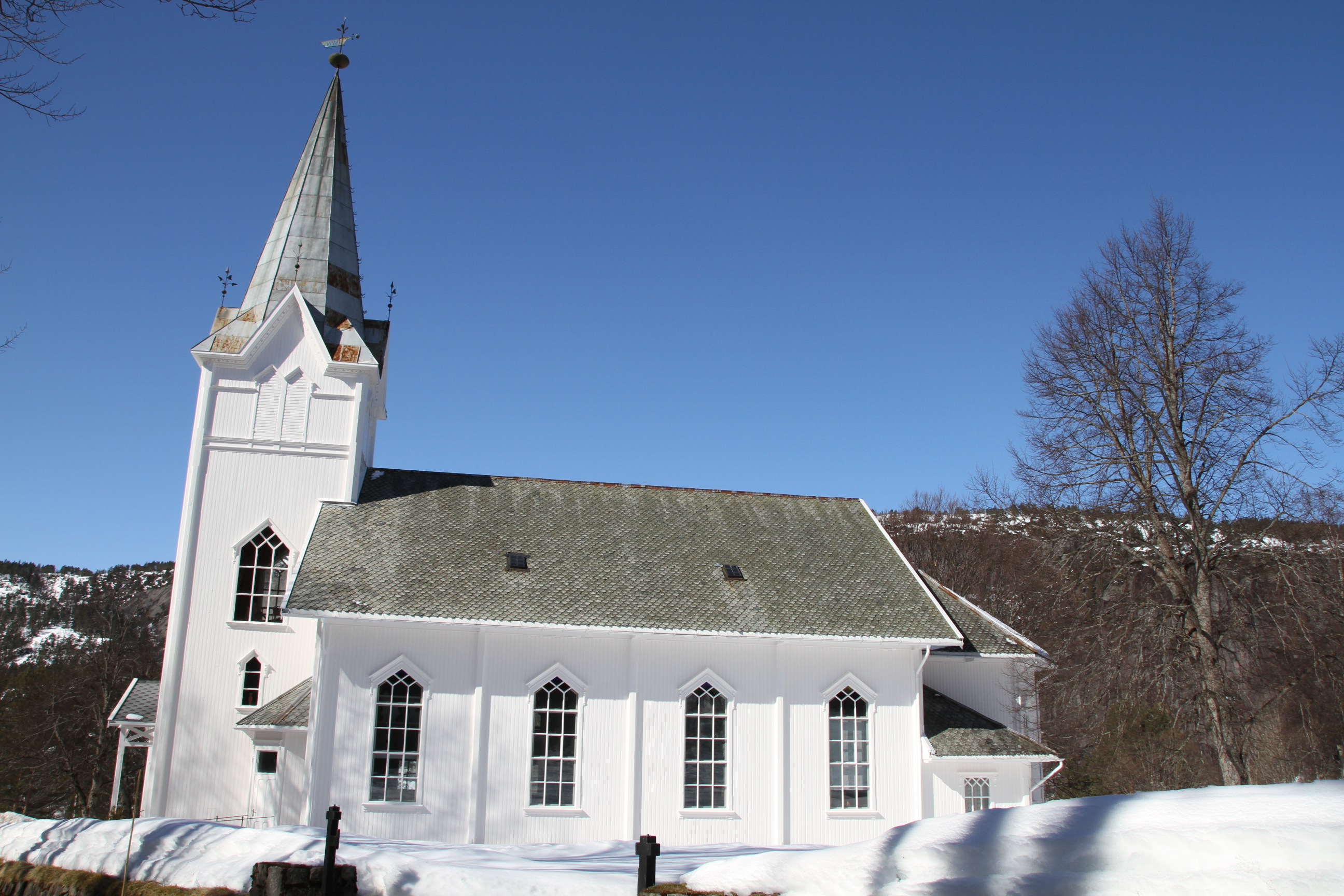

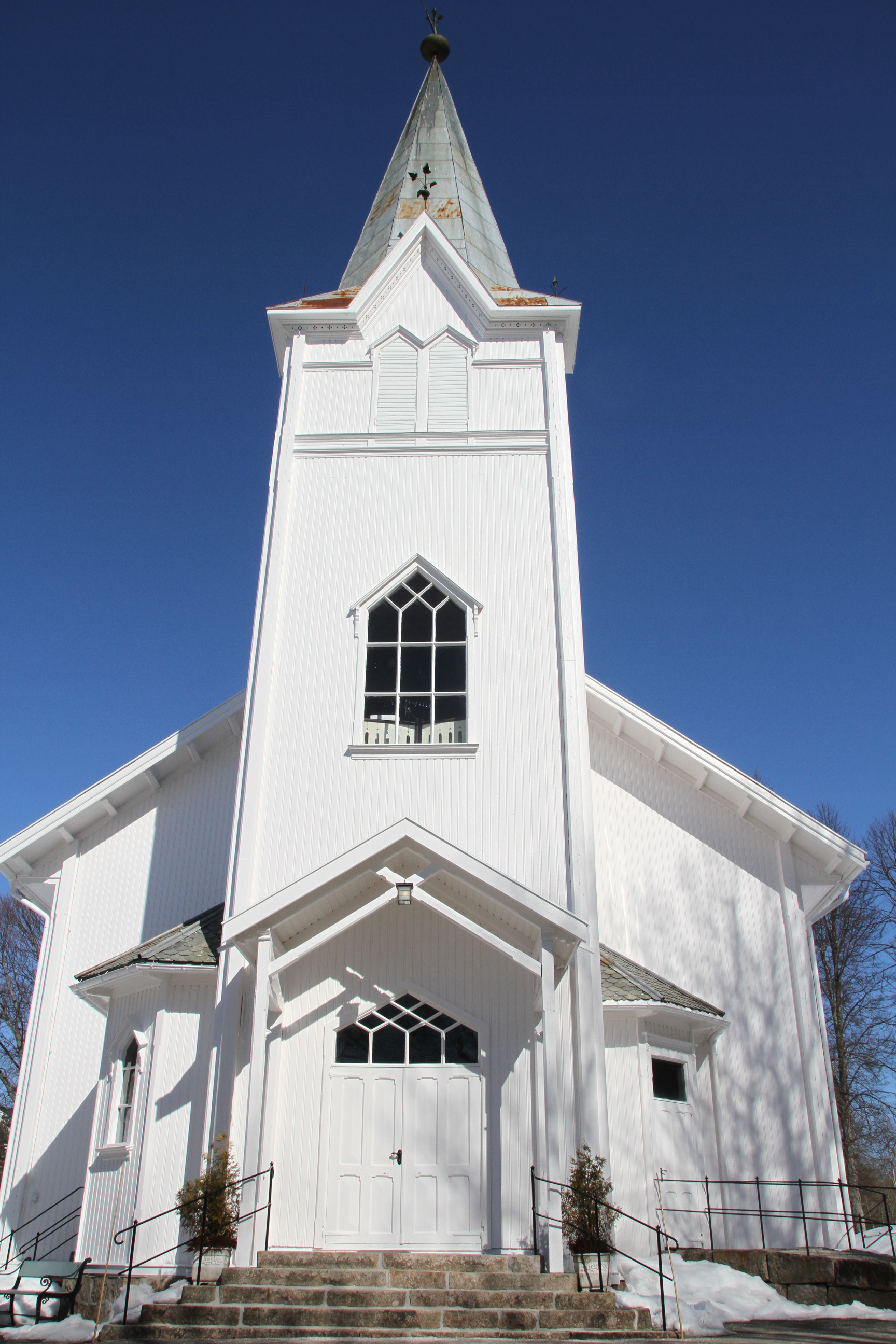

== See also ==
- List of churches in Agder og Telemark
