= Tovdal Church =

Church in Agder, Norway

- Tovdal kyrkje
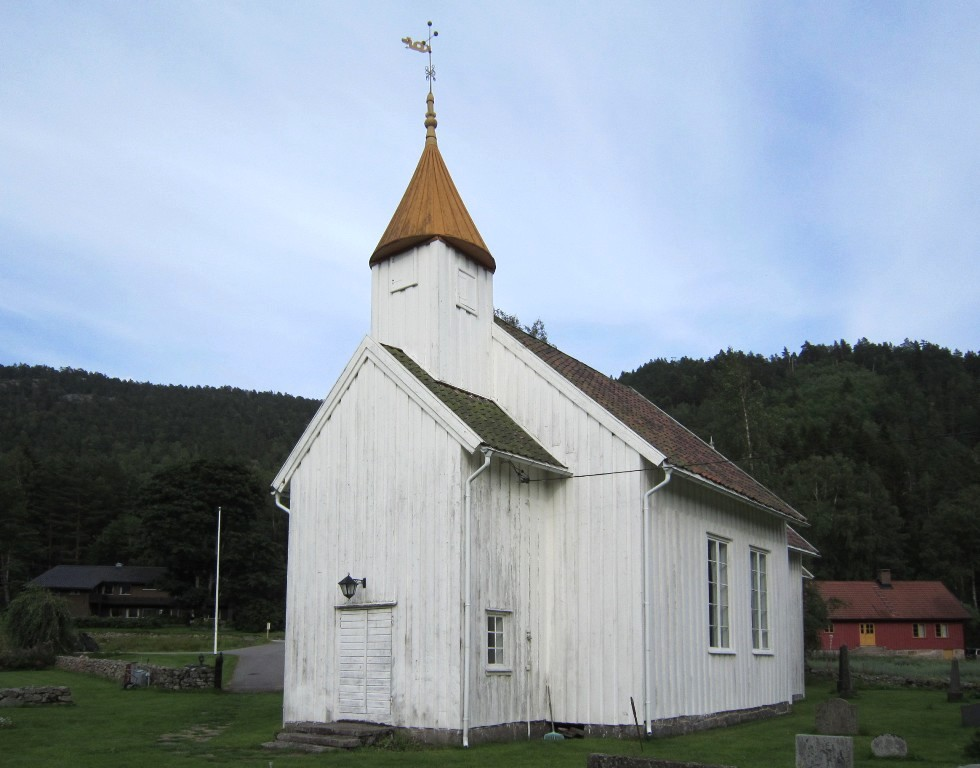
- View of the church
- Tovdal Church
- 58.807131°N 08.174901°E
- Location: Åmli Municipality, Agder
- Country: Norway
- Denomination: Church of Norway
- Previous denomination: Catholic Church
- Churchmanship: Evangelical Lutheran

History
- Former name: Hillestad kyrkje
- Status: Parish church
- Founded: 13th century
- Consecrated: 4 Mar 1827

Architecture
- Functional status: Active
- Architectural type: Long church
- Completed: 1820 (206 years ago)

Specifications
- Capacity: 105
- Materials: Wood

Administration
- Diocese: Agder og Telemark
- Deanery: Aust-Nedenes prosti
- Parish: Åmli
- Norwegian Cultural Heritage Site
- Type: Church
- Status: Listed
- ID: 85660

Tovdal Church (Norwegian: Tovdal kyrkje) is a parish church of the Church of Norway in Åmli Municipality in Agder county, Norway. It is located in the village of Hillestad. It is one of the churches for the Åmli parish which is part of the Aust-Nedenes prosti (deanery) in the Diocese of Agder og Telemark. The white, wooden church was built in a long church design in 1820 using plans drawn up by an unknown architect. The church seats about 105 people.

== History ==
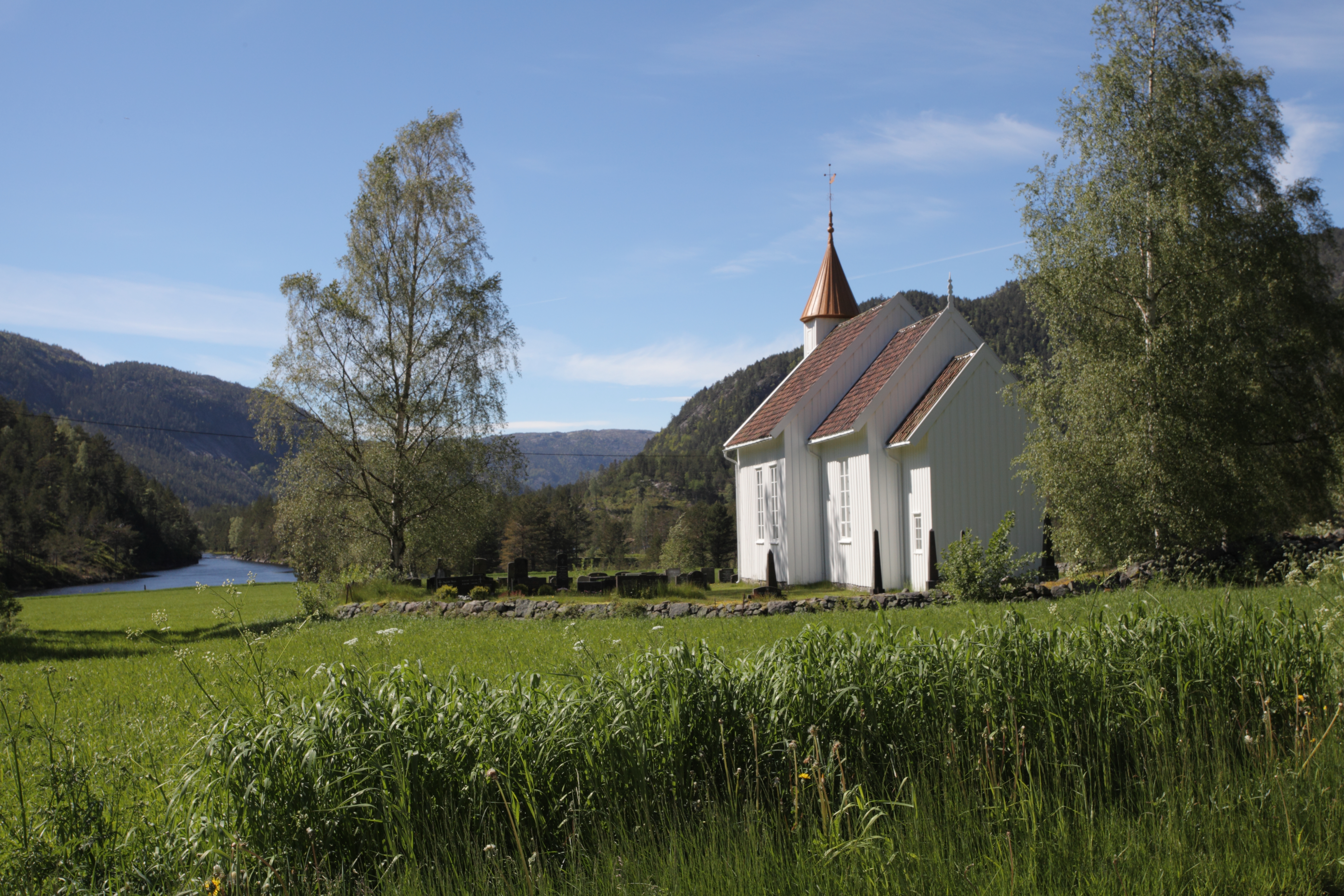
View of the church

The earliest existing historical records of the church date back to the year 1594, but the church was not new that year. The first church on this site was a stave church that may have been built in the 13th century. The church was known as the Hillestad church since it was located on the Hillestad farm and the parish was historically known as Lille Topdal. In 1723, the King sold the church during the Norwegian church sale to raise money to pay off his war debts. In 1780, the people of the parish raised money to purchase the church from private ownership and since then it has been owned by the parish. In 1802 the church was described as being in good condition, but by 1818 the church had plans to add on to the old building by building a new nave and to use the old church as the choir and sacristy. The church began to work on this, but they were rebuked by the Bishop for failing to obtain the proper permits from the diocese. As they began to work on the building, it was deemed in such poor condition that they just tore down the whole building in 1820.

Immediately after the old building was taken down, construction on a new wooden church was begun on the same site. It is not known who designed the building, but some have speculated that it was Gjermund Gunnarson Veum who built the nearby Gjøvdal Church several years earlier. The new church was consecrated on 4 March 1827. The name of the parish was changed to Tovdal and since then the church has been known as Tovdal Church. Originally, the church was unpainted on the exterior, but in 1837, the church exterior was painted red. In 1854, the church was painted white. The church underwent some restoration work during the 1930s and during that time, the exterior was painted red once again. In 1964, the church was painted white once again. In 1980, a sacristy was built on the eastern end of the building.

== See also ==
- List of churches in Agder og Telemark
