= Skjeggedal, Agder =

Village in Åmli Municipality, Norway

Skjeggedal
- Village area
- Interactive map of Skjeggedal
- Coordinates: 58.7530°N 08.1256°E
- Country: Norway
- Region: Southern Norway
- County: Agder
- District: Østre Agder
- Municipality: Åmli Municipality
- Elevation: 223 m (732 ft)
- Time zone: UTC+01:00 (CET)
  - Summer (DST): UTC+02:00 (CEST)
- Post Code: 4834 Risdal

Skjeggedal is a remote village area in Åmli Municipality in Agder county, Norway. The village is located in the Skjeggedalen valley in western Åmli. The area is only accessible by a rural road leading northwest from the village of Mykland (in neighboring Froland Municipality).
