= Gjøvdal Church =

Church in Agder, Norway

- Gjøvdal kirke
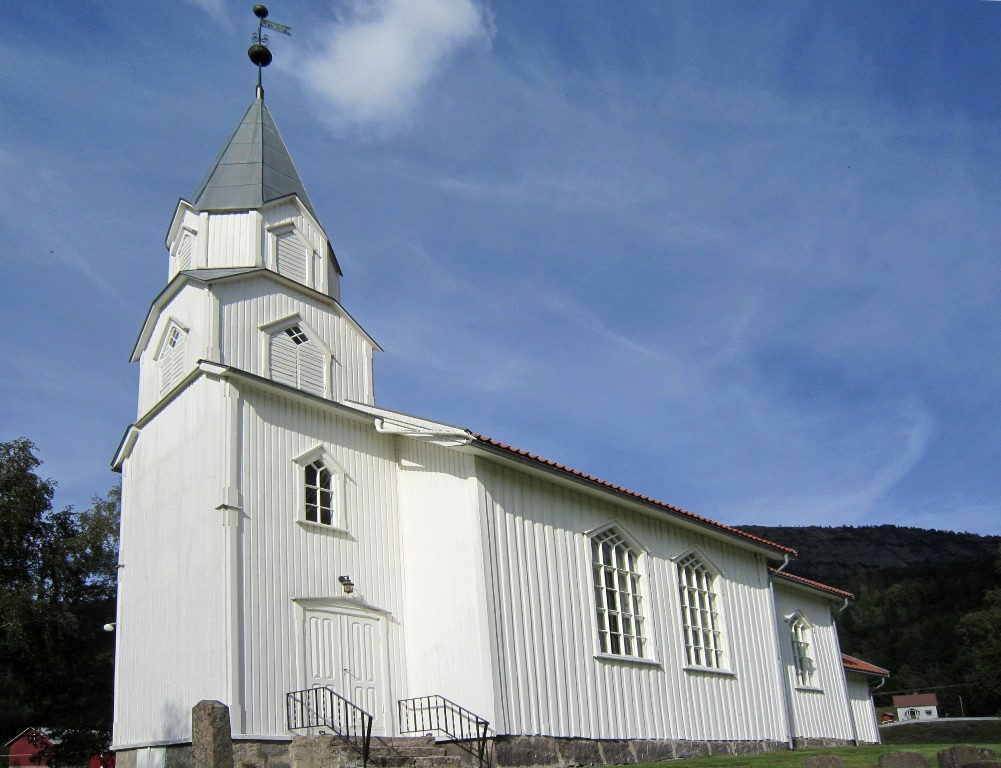
- View of the church
- Gjøvdal Church
- 58.871908°N 08.303955°E
- Location: Åmli Municipality, Agder
- Country: Norway
- Denomination: Church of Norway
- Previous denomination: Catholic Church
- Churchmanship: Evangelical Lutheran

History
- Status: Parish church
- Founded: 13th century

Architecture
- Functional status: Active
- Architect: Gjermund Gunnarson Veum
- Architectural type: Long church
- Completed: 1803 (223 years ago)

Specifications
- Capacity: 200
- Materials: Wood

Administration
- Diocese: Agder og Telemark
- Deanery: Aust-Nedenes prosti
- Parish: Gjøvdal
- Norwegian Cultural Heritage Site
- Type: Church
- Status: Listed
- ID: 84265

Gjøvdal Church (Norwegian: Gjøvdal kyrkje) is a parish church of the Church of Norway in Åmli Municipality in Agder county, Norway. It is located in the village of Askland in the Gjøv river valley. It is the church for the Gjøvdal parish which is part of the Aust-Nedenes prosti (deanery) in the Diocese of Agder og Telemark. The white, wooden church was built in a long church design in 1803 using plans drawn up by the architect Gjermund Gunnarson Veum. The church seats about 200 people.

== History ==
The earliest existing historical records of the church date back to the year 1421, but the church was likely founded during the 1200s. The church is believed to be located on the same site as an ancient heathen hof. The first church was a stave church that served the whole Gjøvdal valley. The church was historically known as Askland Church since it is located in the village of Askland, but around the 1600s, it began to be known as the Gjøvdal Church, after the valley in which it is located. In 1724, the priest Niels Pedersen purchased all the churches in the Åmli prestegjeld when the King put them up for sale to help pay off his war debts in the great Norwegian church sale. Over the years, the ownership of the church passed between different people. In 1779, the people of the Gjøvdal area purchased the church together so that the congregation could own the building. After purchasing the church, the parish noted that the church was in poor condition and repairs were undertaken to improve the building.

By the 1800s, the church was still in poor condition and the repairs had not helped a lot, so it was decided to tear down and replace the old stave church. The church was torn down in the spring of 1803. A new, larger timber-framed church was built that same year on the same site by Gjermund Gunnarson Veum from Fyresdal, a neighboring valley to the north. It has a rectangular nave, a straight-ended chancel and a sacristy to the east. To the west there is a tower with an entry porch at the base of the tower. During construction in the summer of 1803, the services took place outdoors. In the autumn of 1803, the church was enclosed, so the priest received permission from the bishop to use the church, although it took a couple more years before the church was fully completed. The altarpiece is called Gethsemane and it was completed in 1922. There was some restoration work done in 1953 to celebrate the 150th anniversary of its completion.

== See also ==
- List of churches in Agder og Telemark
