= Dølemo =

Village in Åmli Municipality, Norway

- Village
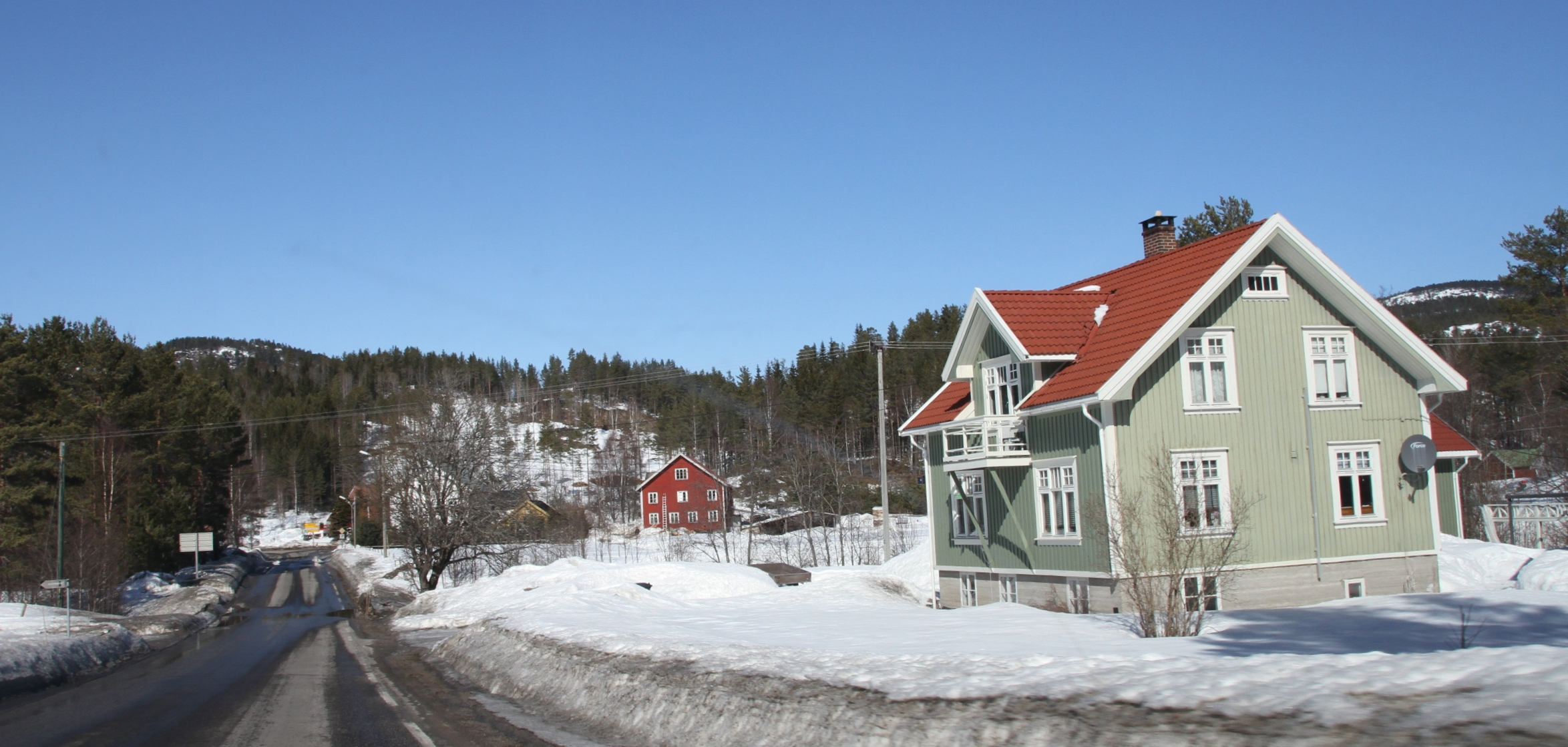
- View of the village
- Interactive map of Dølemo
- Coordinates: 58.7123°N 08.3437°E
- Country: Norway
- Region: Southern Norway
- County: Agder
- District: Østre Agder
- Municipality: Åmli Municipality
- Elevation: 174 m (571 ft)
- Time zone: UTC+01:00 (CET)
  - Summer (DST): UTC+02:00 (CEST)
- Post Code: 4869 Dølemo

Dølemo is a village in Åmli Municipality in Agder county, Norway. The village has a population of about 200. It is home to the municipal kindergarten, an elementary school, a shop, and many thriving clubs and organizations. Dølemo is often called "the voluntary village", the reason for this being the citizens' dedication when the annual Dølemo Market has to be arranged in the last week of August. The village sits at the intersection of the Norwegian National Road 41 and the Norwegian County Road 413. The village of Eppeland lies about 1.5 kilometres (0.93 mi) to the northeast, the village of Vehus lies about 5 kilometres (3.1 mi) to the south, and the village of Ytre Ramse lies about 10 kilometres (6.2 mi) to the northwest.

== History ==
Dølemo was founded as a village around 1880. The first houses to be built in Dølemo were old farmhouses which were moved over from Eppeland. At the time, Dølemo had a café, a shoemaker, and a post office. Many of the inhabitants used to work in the surrounding forests for landowners from around Dølemo. Dølemo was a place for people to hold markets and horse races. This tradition becomes apparent in local place names around Dølemo, as well as on two old boundary stones that remind of the times.

== Culture ==
Dølemo is mostly known for the Dølemo Market which was first held in 1980. Every year Dølemo Market attracts about 15,000 visitors to a traditional fair that focuses on commerce and entertainment. Dølemo has also a heavily involved sports club, Dølemo IL, with sections for skiing, cycling, skating, and physical training groups for children and adults. The Dølemo Village Club is responsible for public buildings and outdoor areas and the Shooting Club has meetings for children and adults both in summer and winter time. The youth club gathers every other Friday night and is popular with the local youth.

== Tourism ==
Dølemo is situated along the Tovdalselva river, which provides great opportunities for swimming and fishing. The Kallingsheia heath provides opportunities for recreation and for visiting genuine wilderness. Dølemo IL has constructed a shelter that can be used by all visitors to the heath. Arendal and Oppland Turistforening's network of cross-country ski runs starts at Dølemo and it is possible to ski on a nonstop track to Trondheim.

The Hillestad Gallery is located 15 kilometres (9.3 mi) from Dølemo in Hillestad.
