= Åmli (village) =

Village in Åmli Municipality, Norway

- Village
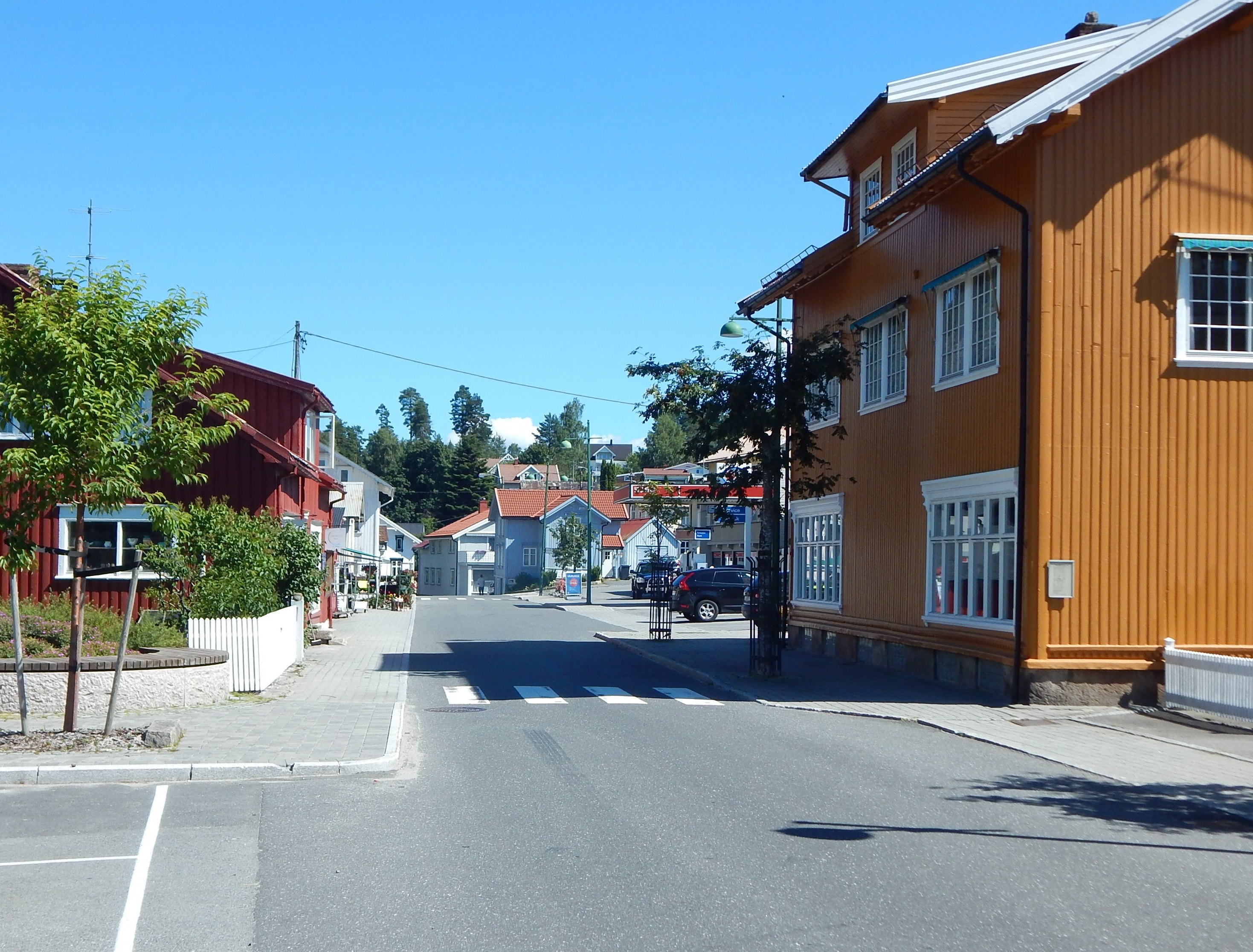
- View of the village
- Interactive map of Åmli
- Coordinates: 58.7657°N 08.4839°E
- Country: Norway
- Region: Southern Norway
- County: Agder
- District: Østre Agder
- Municipality: Åmli Municipality

Area
  - Total: 0.84 km^{2} (0.32 sq mi)
- Elevation: 159 m (522 ft)

Population (2025)
  - Total: 675
  - Density: 804/km^{2} (2,080/sq mi)
- Time zone: UTC+01:00 (CET)
  - Summer (DST): UTC+02:00 (CEST)
- Post Code: 4865 Åmli

Åmli is the administrative centre of Åmli Municipality in Agder county, Norway. The village is located along the Norwegian National Road 41 and the river Nidelva, about 30 kilometres (19 mi) northwest of the town of Tvedestrand via the Norwegian County Road 415. The village of Nelaug lies about 15 kilometres (9.3 mi) to the southeast and the village of Dølemo lies about 10 kilometres (6.2 mi) to the southwest. The 0.84-square-kilometre (210-acre) village has a population (2025) of 675 and a population density of 804 inhabitants per square kilometre (2,080/sq mi).

The village of Åmli is the location of the municipal government as well as Åmli Church, the main church for the municipality. There is also a school, high school, library, and museum. The village is the largest in the municipality, so it is also the main area of commerce in the municipality. The Åmliavisa newspaper is published weekly from Åmli. The southernmost part of the village is sometimes referred to as Lauveik.

== Media gallery ==
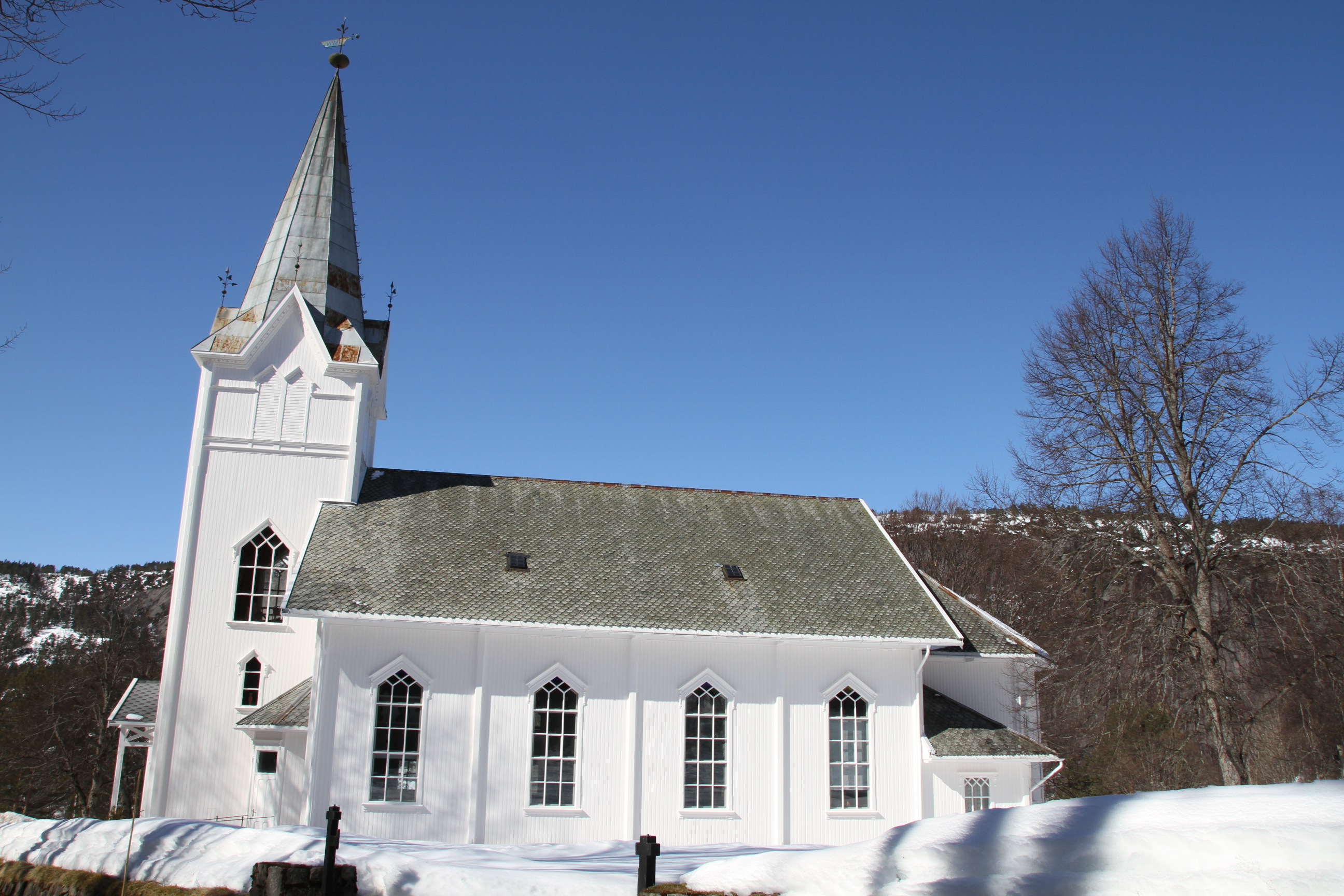
Åmli Church

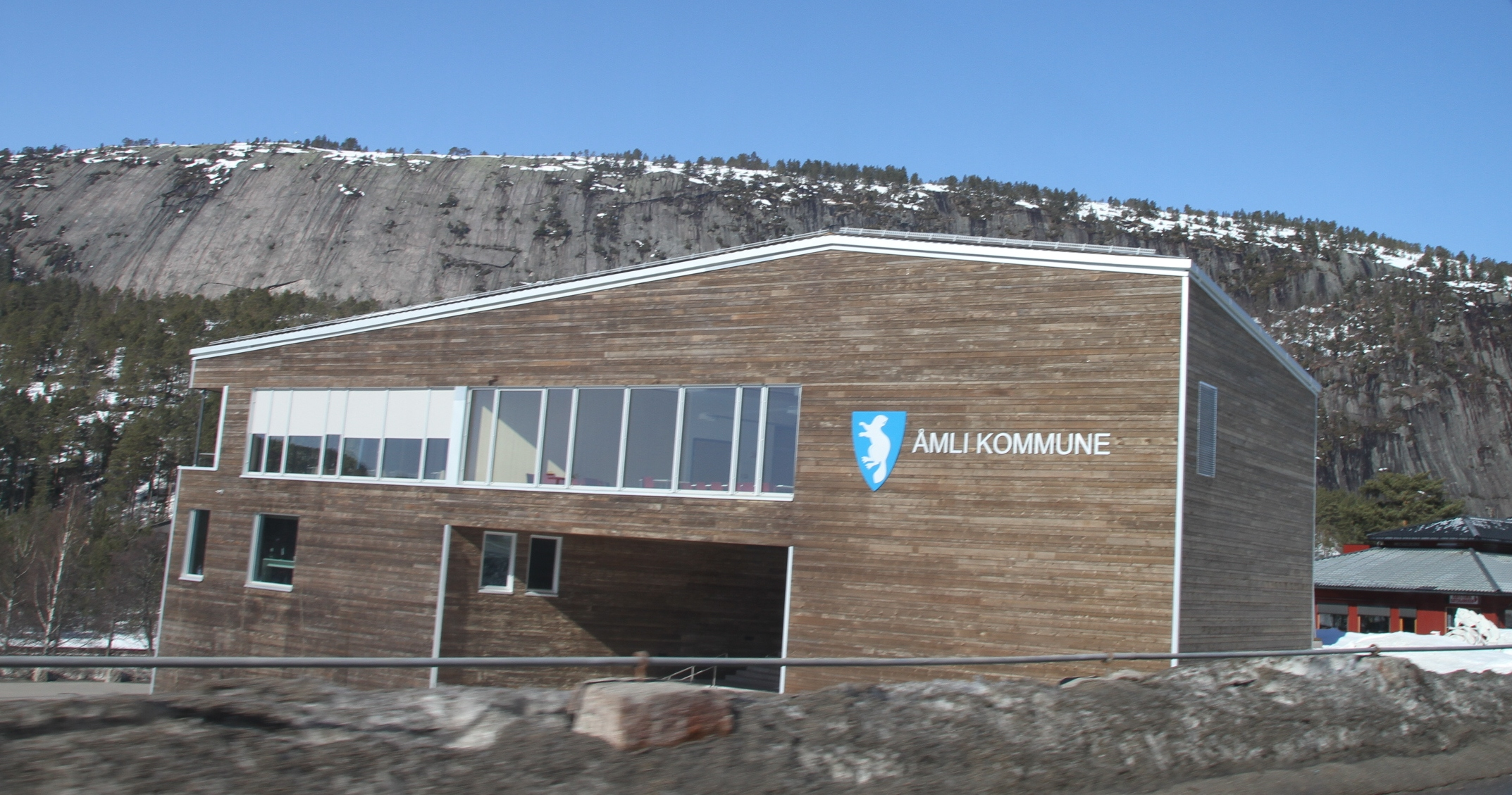
Municipal building

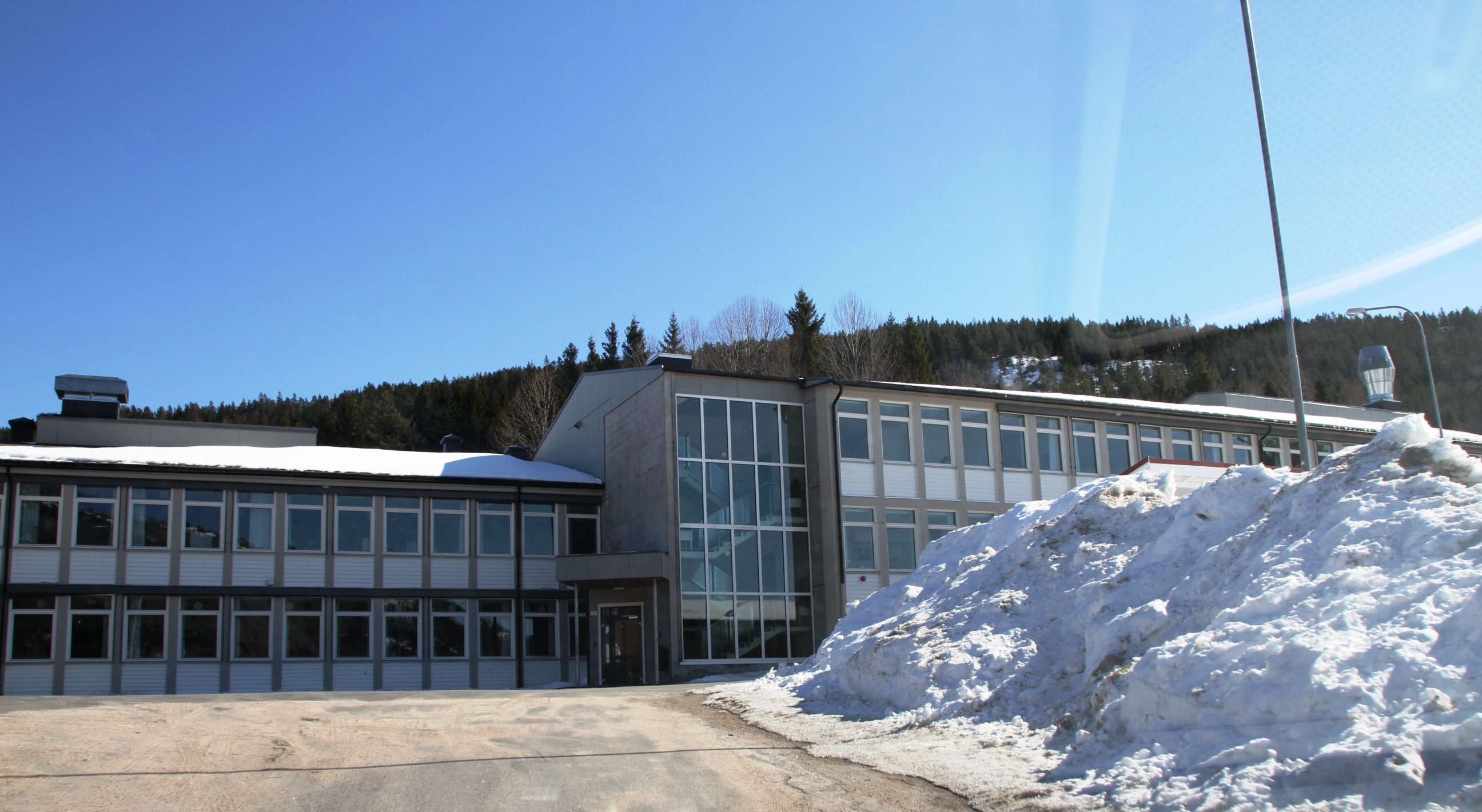
Åmli school

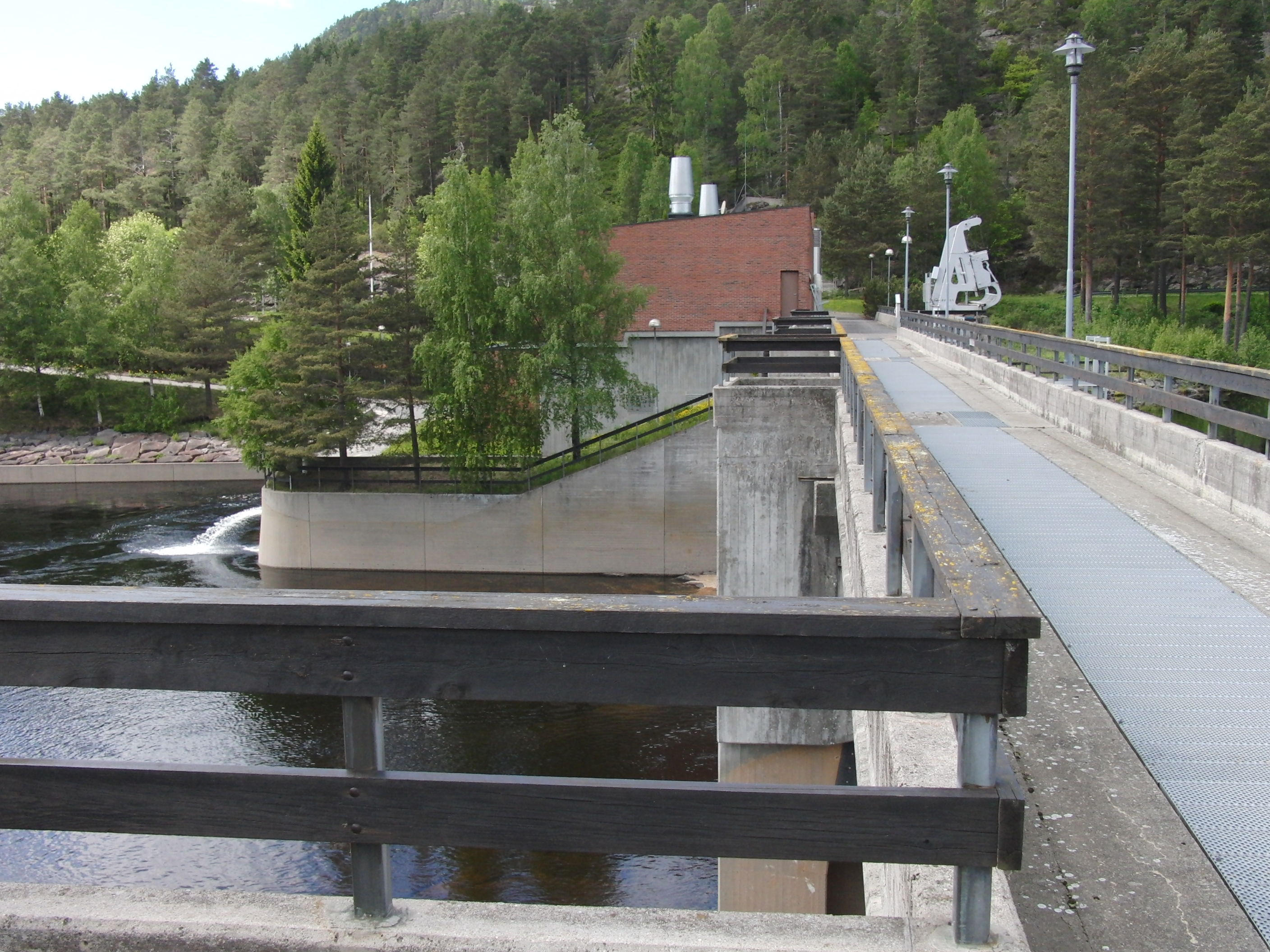
Åmli power station

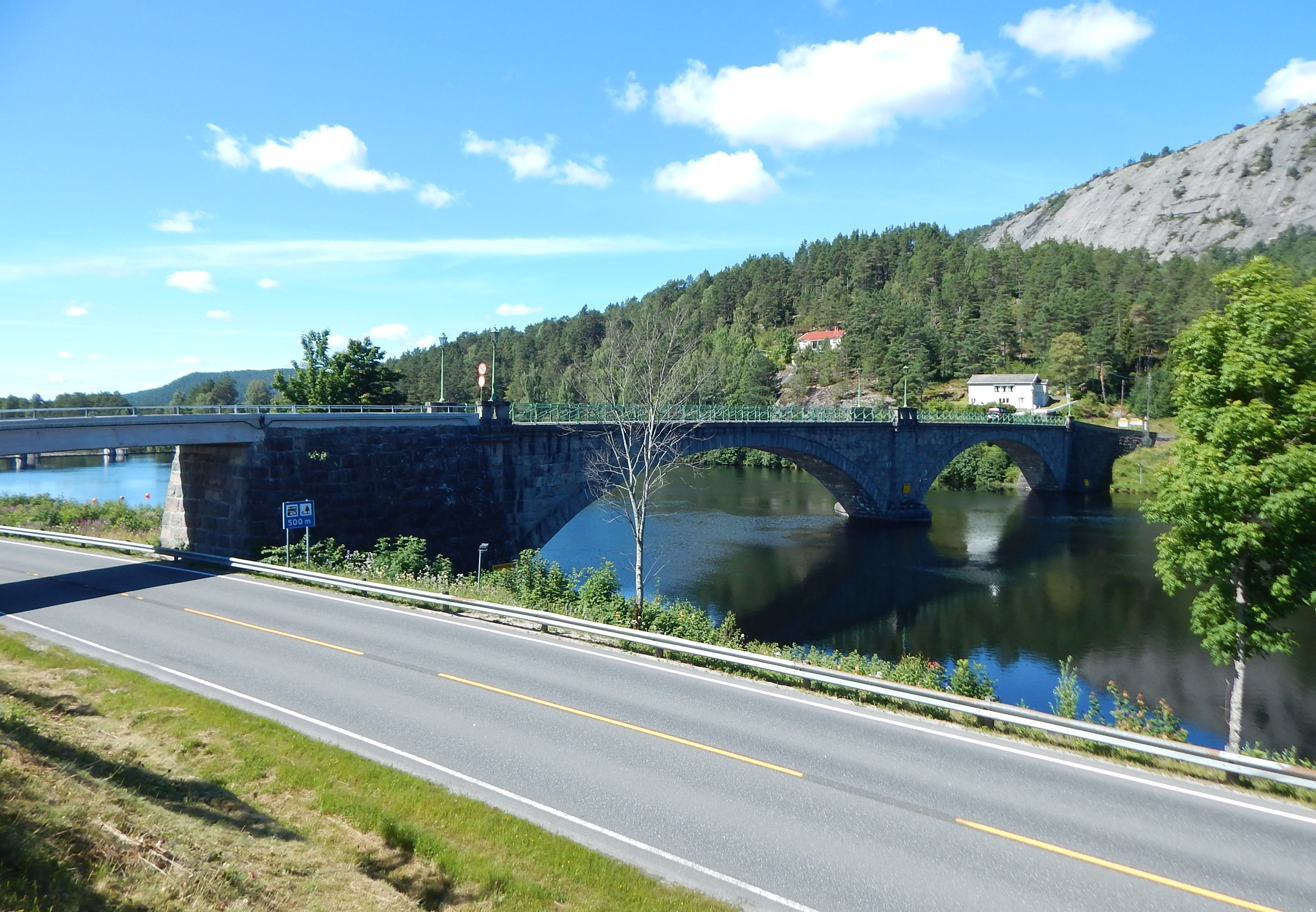
Åmfoss bridge in Åmli

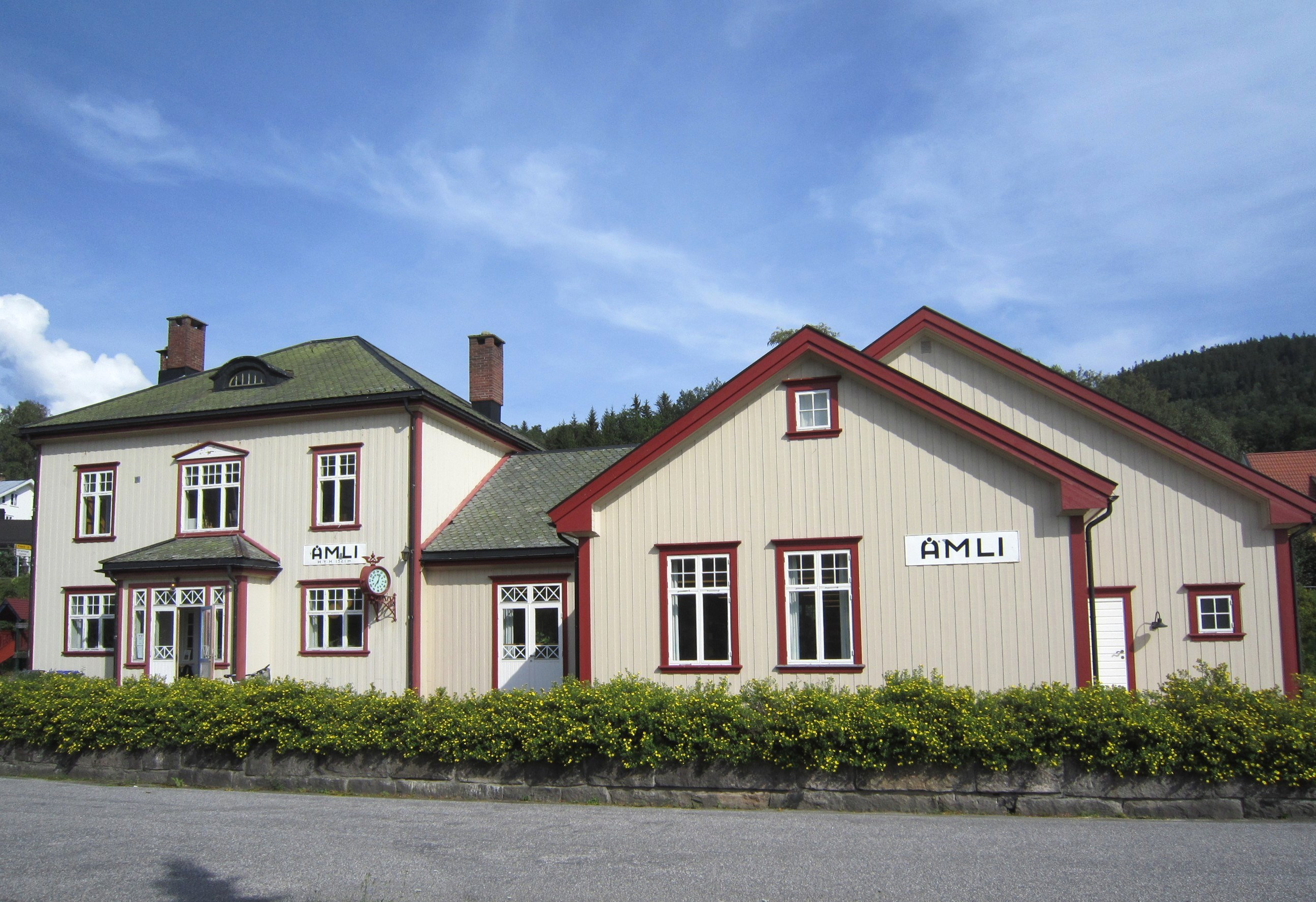
Former train station, now a library
