= Rise Station =

Railway station in Arendal, Norway

Rise
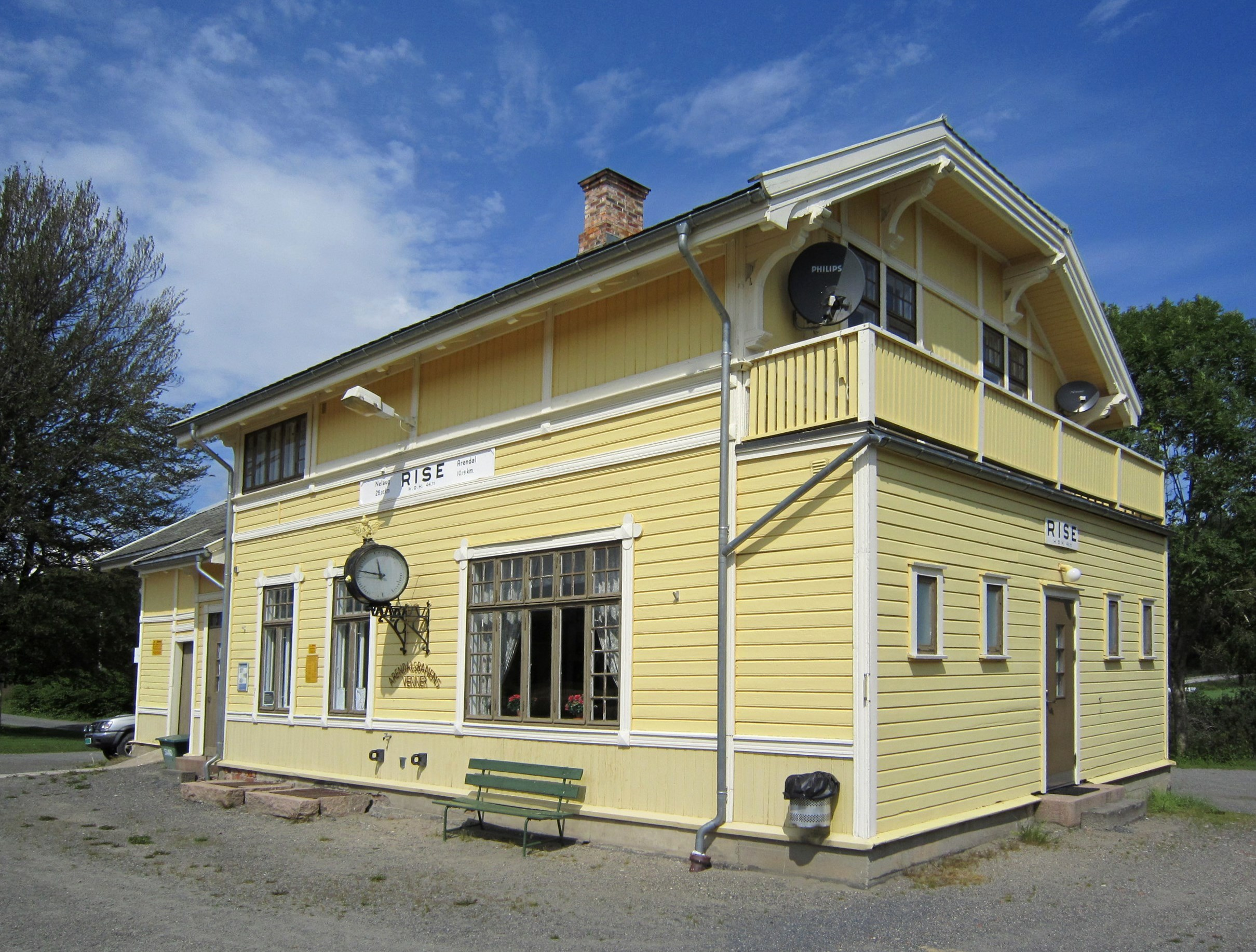

General information
- Location: Rise, Arendal Municipality; Norway
- Coordinates: 58°28′06″N 8°37′23″E
- Elevation: 44.8 m (147 ft) AMSL
- Owner: Bane NOR
- Operator: Go-Ahead Norge
- Lines: Arendal Line; Grimstad Line (closed)
- Distance: 307.44 km (191.03 mi) (Oslo S); 10.19 km (6.33 mi) (Arendal); 22.19 km (13.79 mi) (Grimstad)
- Platforms: 3

Construction
- Architect: Paul Armin Due

History
- Opened: 14 September 1907
Location

Rise Station (Norwegian: Rise stasjon) is a railway station at Rise in Arendal Municipality, Norway. Located on the Arendal Line, it is served by the Go-Ahead Norge. The station opened as the terminus of the Grimstad Line in 1907; the following year it became a transfer station to the Arendal Line. It then received a station building designed by Paul Armin Due. In 1935 and 1936, the lines were converted from narrow gauge to standard gauge, although for a year the station served as a break-of-gauge station. The Grimstad Line closed in 1961 and in 1983 the station was unstaffed.

== Facilities and service ==
Located at 344.8 meters (1,131 ft) above mean sea level, the station is 10.19 kilometers (6.33 mi) from Arendal Station and was 22.19 kilometers (13.79 mi) from Grimstad Station, and 307.44 kilometers (191.03 mi) from Oslo Central Station. The station is owned by the Norwegian National Rail Administration; it has parking for 15 cars, is unstaffed and lacks a ticket machine.

The station is served by the Norwegian State Railway's feeder service on the Arendal Line with up to five daily services per direction. Travel time to Arendal is 10 minutes while travel time to Nelaug is 25 minutes.

== History ==
The station opened on 14 September 1907 as the terminus of the private Grimstad–Froland Line (GFB) which ran to Grimstad. The station was from the opening owned by the Norwegian State Railways (NSB), who were in the process of building the Arendal–Åmli Line. GFB therefore had to pay rent to NSB until 1912, when NSB took over the Grimstad Line. Originally, the station consisted of temporary platform, a roundhouse, a turntable with a 6.5-meter (21 ft) diameter and a coal shed.

NSB built a station building designed by Paul Armin Due. It was of the Flikkeid-type, as it was a duplicate of Flikkeid Station on the Flekkefjord Line and was the same as was built at Froland Station on the Arendal Line. It was in Art Nouveau style with a goods room built as an extension. The outhouse was the same type as had been built at Flikkeid and at Urdland Station and has three places and a wood storage. Also the water tower was the same type as at Flikkeid. The station also received a guard residence and a small shed. The line from Treungen came from the north-west, while the lines from Arendal and Grimstad game from the south-east, with the Grimstad Line south of the Arendal Line. Track 1 had a side platform which it shared with the station building, while Track 2 and 3 had a shared island platform. Eastwards, Track 1 was only connected to the Arendal Line, while Track 3 and 4 was only connected to the Grimstad Line. All four were connected towards Treungen.

Rise was originally a transfer station between the Arendal Line and the Grimstad Line. Trains were normally coordinated so there would be a train to Arendal at Track 1, a train to Treungen at Track 2 and a train to Grimstad at Track 3. The Arendal Line was converted to standard gauge in 1935, and Rise Station temporarily became a station on the Sørland Line from 9 November. This caused a break-of-gauge at Rise, causing transshipment of all passengers and freight. This caused a break-of-gauge at Rise, causing transshipment of all passengers and freight. In 1936, the Grimstad Line was converted to standard gauge and the turntable replaced with one with a 16-meter (52 ft) diameter.

The last train to run on the Grimstad Line was on 31 August 1961. The passenger service was replaced by bus; the service from Grimstad to Rykene was extended to Rise, where there was transfer with the train. Later, the bus service was moved to transfer to the Grimstad bus was made in Arendal. Demolition of the line started on 19 September and lasted until 21 November, when all but the last 100 meters (330 ft) from Rise Station had been removed. The level crossing east of the station was subsequently replaced with an overpass. As the roundtable was no longer needed, it was removed, although the pit remains. Scheduled train remained at Rise until 1979. From 1 November 1983, the station was unstaffed. In 1985, the guard house and outhouse were sold. The line took electric traction into use on 15 June 1995. From 20 October, the service was terminated on the Arendal Line and the Bratsberg Line. NSB had a large shortage of motormen, and chose to close operations on the lines with least traffic to allocate sufficient personnel to areas with higher ridership. Traffic resumed on 24 June 2001.

Preceding station		Following station
Bråstad; Rossedalen	Arendal Line	Blakstad
Preceding station	Local trains	Following station
Bråstad	Arendal Line	Blakstad
