= Bråstad Station =

Railway station in Arendal, Norway

Bråstad
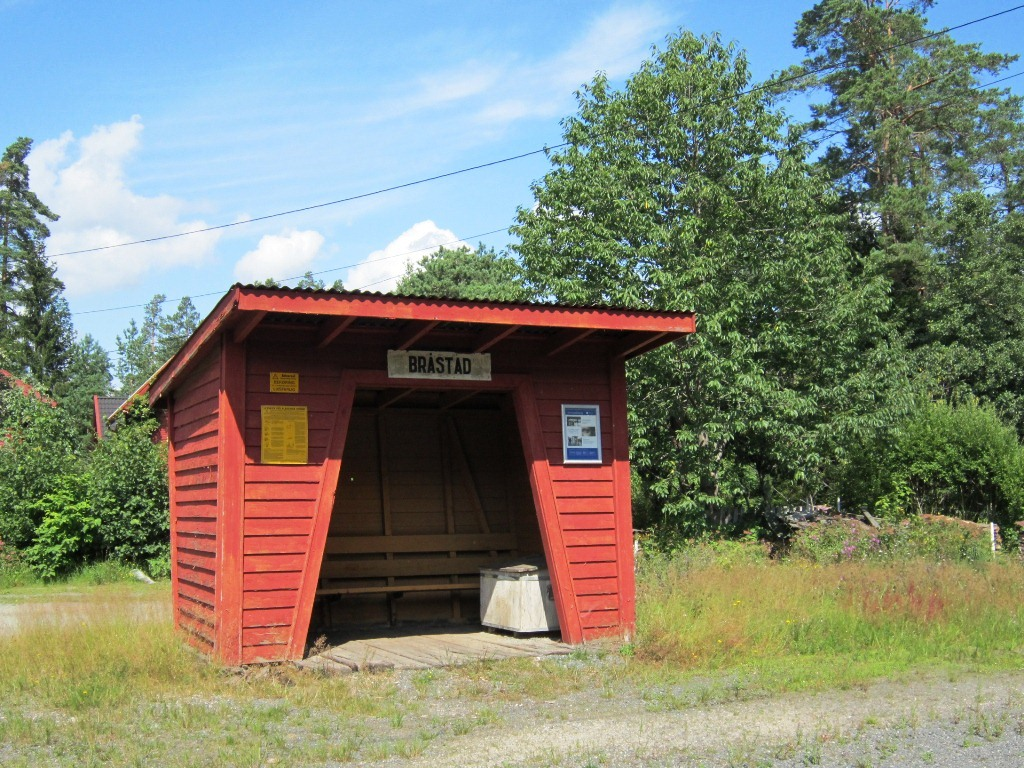
- Bråstad station (2011)

General information
- Location: Bråstad, Arendal Municipality; Norway
- Coordinates: 58°27′46″N 8°41′23″E
- Elevation: 38.9 m (128 ft)
- Owner: Bane NOR
- Operator: Go-Ahead Norge
- Line: Arendal Line
- Distance: 312.52 km (194.19 mi) (Oslo S); 5.11 km (3.18 mi) (Arendal)
- Platforms: 1

Construction
- Architect: Paul Armin Due

History
- Opened: 23 November 1908
Location

Bråstad Station (Norwegian: Bråstad stoppested) is a railway station at Bråstad in Arendal Municipality, Norway. Located on the Arendal Line it is served by Go-Ahead Norge. The station was opened as part of Arendal–Åmli Line on 23 November 1908 and originally consisted of a station building designed by Paul Armin Due, a guard house and a loading spur. The station was called Braastad until 1921 and remained staffed until 1928. Since the 1980s, the station has consisted of a shed and platform.

== Facilities and service ==
The station is 5.11 kilometers (3.18 mi) from Arendal Station at 38.9 meters (128 ft) above mean sea level, and 312.52 kilometers (194.19 mi) from Oslo Central Station. It has a shed and parking for three to five cars. The facilities are owned by the Norwegian National Rail Administration.

The station is served by the Go-Ahead Norge feeder service on the Arendal Line with up to five daily services per direction. Travel time to Arendal is 5 minutes while travel time to Nelaug is 30 minutes.

== History ==
The station was built close to the farm Bråstad on the only horizontal section of any size between Arendal and Rise. It opened on 23 November 1908 and was then the only intermediate station on the section of line between Arendal and Froland. It consisted of a station building designed by Paul Armin Due. Originally the station had a passing loop and a short spur for loading freight cars. There was also a one and a half-story residential house for a guard and an outhouse. The station was originally named Braastad, but was named Bråstad from 23 April 1921. The station was originally staffed, but became unstaffed from 15 May 1928. The passing loops and spur have since been removed. The residence and outhouse were sold in 1970 and the station building demolished in 1982. The line past the station took electric traction into use on 15 June 1995.

Preceding station		Following station
Stoa	Arendal Line	Rise; Rossedalen
Preceding station	Local trains	Following station
Stoa	Arendal Line	Rise
