= Bøylestad Station =

Railway station in Åmli, Norway

Bøylestad Station Bøylestad holdeplass
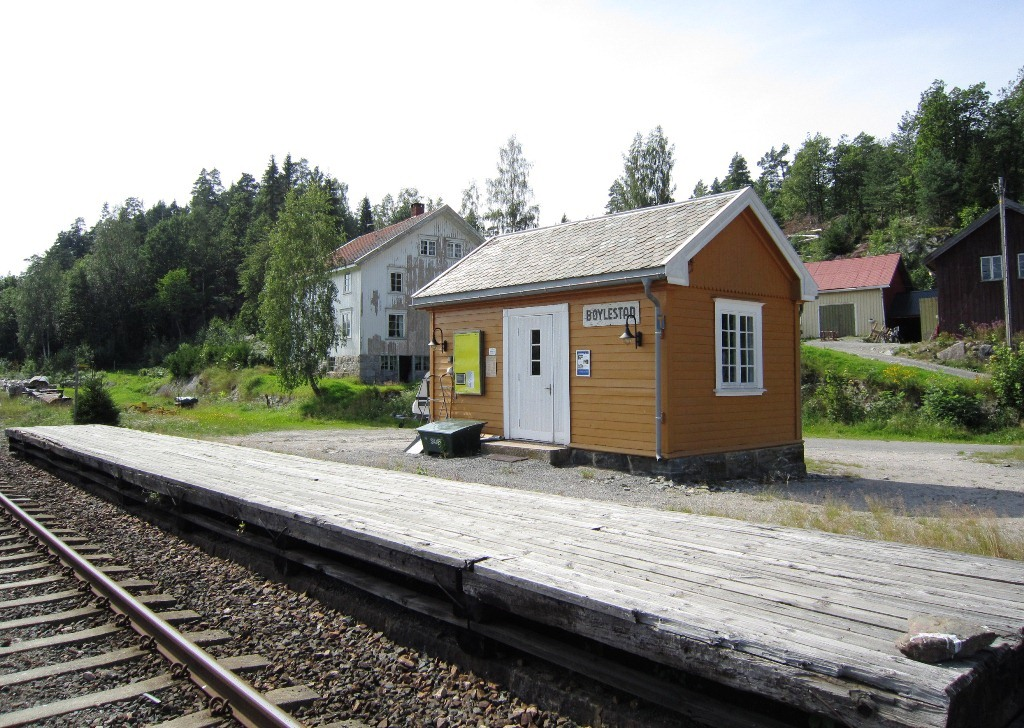
- View of the station

General information
- Location: Bøylestad, Froland Municipality; Norway
- Coordinates: 58.5760°N 08.7034°E
- Elevation: 75.0 km (46.6 mi)
- System: Railway station
- Owner: Bane NOR
- Operator: Go-Ahead Norge
- Line: Arendalsbanen
- Distance: 293.28 km (182.24 mi) (Oslo S); 22.91 km (14.24 mi) (Arendal)
- Platforms: 1
- Connections: None

Construction
- Parking: 5
- Cycle facilities: No
- Architect: Harald Kaas

History
- Opened: 1910
Location

Bøylestad Station (Norwegian: Bøylestad holdeplass) is a railway station in the village of Bøylestad in Froland Municipality in Agder county, Norway. Located on the Arendal Line, it is served by the Go-Ahead Norge. The station was opened in 1910 as part of Arendal–Åmli Line. The rural station has no services such as food or bathrooms.

Preceding station		Following station
Froland	Arendal Line	Flaten
Preceding station	Local trains	Following station
Froland	Arendal Line	Flaten
