= Rossedalen Station =

Railway station in Arendal, Norway

Rossedalen
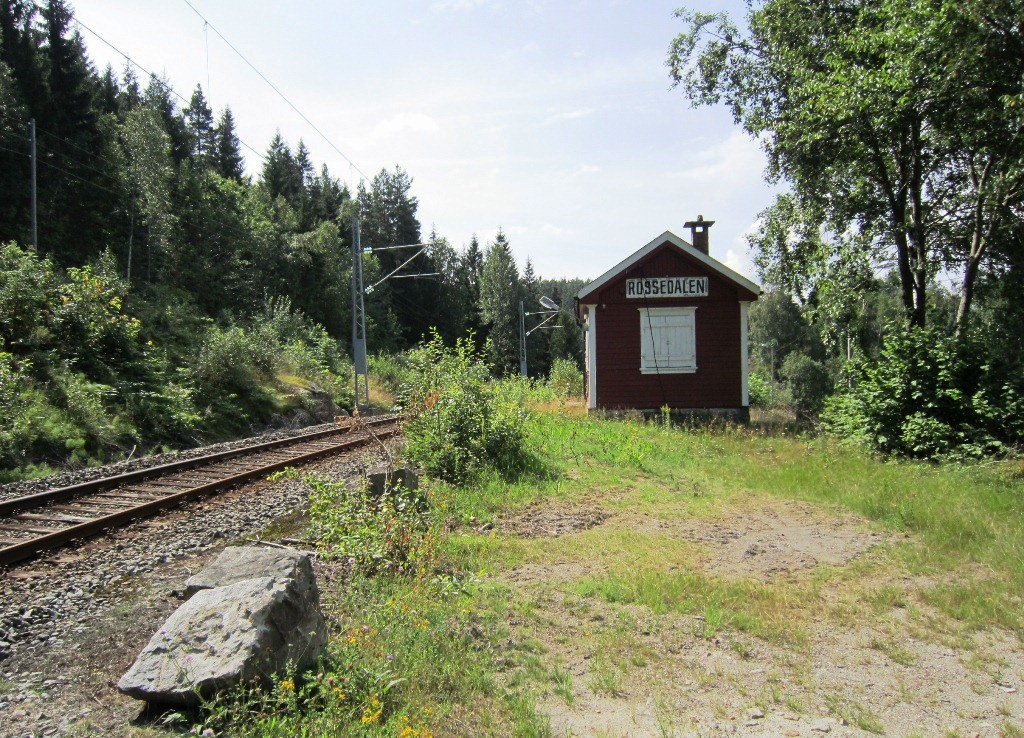

General information
- Location: Rossedalen, Arendal Municipality; Norway
- Coordinates: 58.46515°N 8.65705°E
- Elevation: 70.3 m (231 ft)
- Owner: Norwegian State Railways
- Line: Arendal Line
- Distance: 309.77 km (192.48 mi) (Oslo S); 7.86 km (4.88 mi) (Arendal)
- Platforms: 1

Construction
- Architect: Harald Kaas

History
- Opened: 1 May 1911
Location

Rossedalen Station (Norwegian: Rossedalen holdeplass) is a former railway station at Rossedalen in Arendal Municipality, Norway. Located on the Arendal Line, it was operated by the Norwegian State Railways. The station was opened on 1 May 1911 and originally consisted of a small station building. The station has never been staffed and has never had a spur or passing loop.

== Facilities and service ==
The station is 7.86 kilometers (4.88 mi) from Arendal Station at 70.3 meters (231 ft) above mean sea level, and 309.77 kilometers (192.48 mi) from Oslo Central Station.

== History ==
Plans for a station at Rossedalen were launched in 1910, two years after the line past the area opened. It received a small station building identical to the one at Torbjørnsbu Station, designed by Harald Kaas. The station has never been staffed, nor has it had any spurs or passing loops.

Preceding station		Following station
Bråstad	Arendal Line	Rise
