= Flaten Station =

Railway station in Åmli, Norway

Flaten
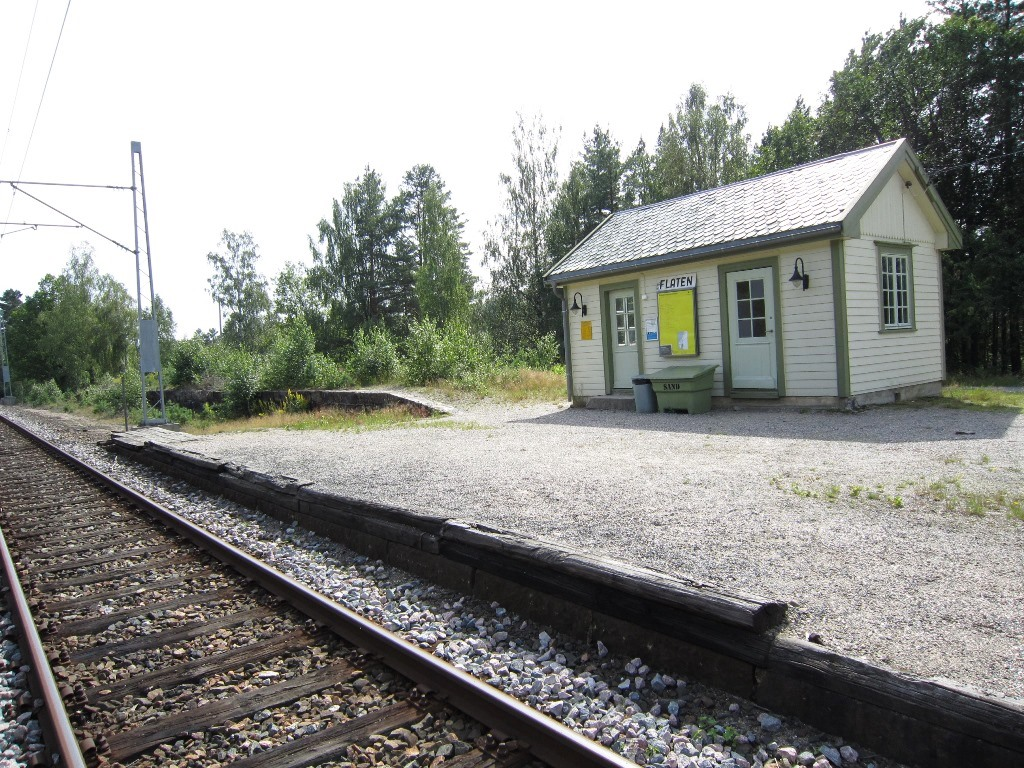

General information
- Location: Flaten, Åmli Municipality; Norway
- Coordinates: 58.6364°N 08.6813°E
- Elevation: 140.4 m (461 ft)
- System: Railway station
- Owner: Bane NOR
- Operator: Go-Ahead Norge
- Line: Arendalsbanen
- Distance: 285.54 km (177.43 mi) (Oslo S); 31.76 km (19.73 mi) (Arendal)
- Platforms: 1

Construction
- Parking: 5
- Architect: Harald Kaas

History
- Opened: 1910
Location

Flaten Station (Norwegian: Flaten holdeplass) is a railway station at the village of Flaten in Åmli Municipality in Agder county, Norway. Located along the Arendalsbanen railway line, it is served by Go-Ahead Norge. The station was opened in 1910 as part of Arendal–Åmli Line.

Preceding station		Following station
Bøylestad	Arendal Line	Nelaug
Preceding station	Local trains	Following station
Bøylestad	Arendal Line	Nelaug
