= Nelaug Station =

Railway station in Åmli, Norway

Nelaug
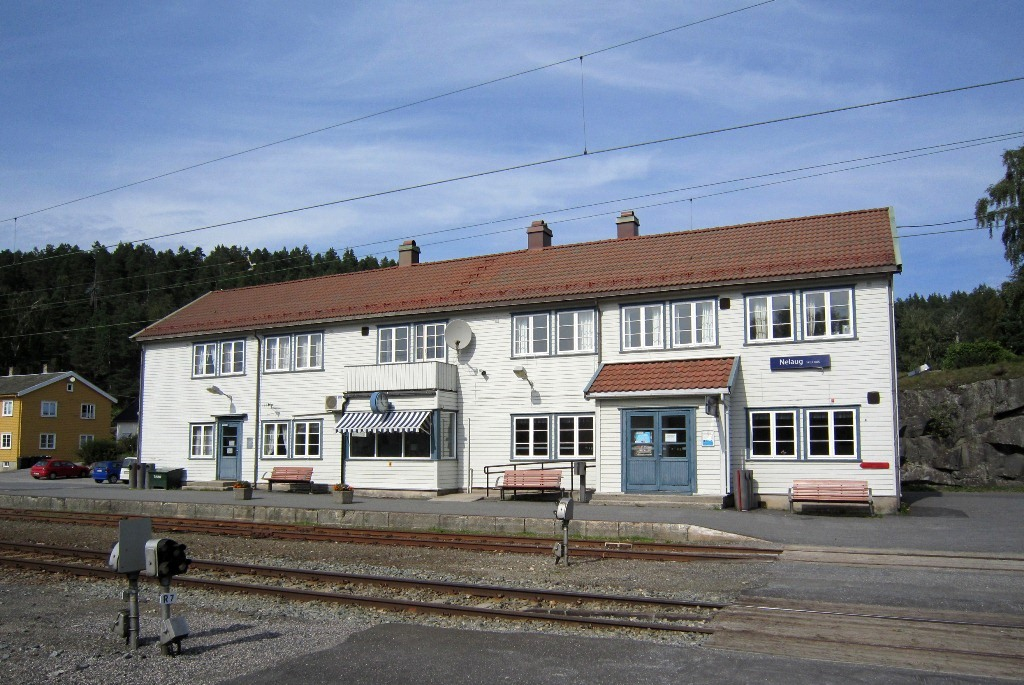
- View of Nelaug station in 2011

General information
- Location: Nelaug, Åmli Municipality; Norway
- Coordinates: 58.6577°N 08.6297°E
- Elevation: 141.1 m (463 ft)
- System: Railway station
- Owner: Bane NOR
- Operator: Go-Ahead Norge
- Lines: Sørlandsbanen; Arendalsbanen
- Distance: 281.41 km (174.86 mi)
- Connections: Bus to Treungen

Construction
- Parking: 10
- Architect: Bjarne Friis Baastad and Gudmund Hoel

Other information
- Station code: NEL

History
- Opened: 10 November 1910
Location

Nelaug Station (Norwegian: Nelaug stasjon) is a railway station located at the village of Nelaug in Åmli Municipality in Agder county, Norway. The station sits just north of the lake Nelaug. The station functions as a meeting station of the Sørlandsbanen and Arendalsbanen railway lines. The Arendalsbanen line is a branch line that runs from Nelaug to Arendal Station. Passengers from Oslo to Arendal must change trains at Nelaug. The station was opened on 10 November 1910, and in 1935, a new building was completed.

== History ==
Since 1910, Nelaug was a stop for the (originally narrow gauged) Treungen Line that was opened to Åmli. In 1935, the Sørland Line was finished from Oslo to Nelaug. At the same time the southern part of the Treungen Line was converted to standard gauge. Also at that time, a new station building was completed at Nelaug by the architects Bjarne Friis Baastad and Gudmund Hoel. From 1935 to 1938, Arendal was the terminal station of the Sørland Line, just like Kragerø Station had been from 1927 to 1935. In 1938 the line from Nelaug to Kristiansand Station was opened.

The traffic on the northern section of the Treungen Line was closed in 1967. The entire community of Nelaug, including store and school, is built up around the train station.

Preceding station	Express trains	Following station
Vennesla towards Stavanger	F5	Vegårshei towards Oslo S
Preceding station	Local trains	Following station
Flaten	Arendalsbanen	—
