= Froland Station =

Railway station in Froland, Norway

Froland Station Froland holdeplass
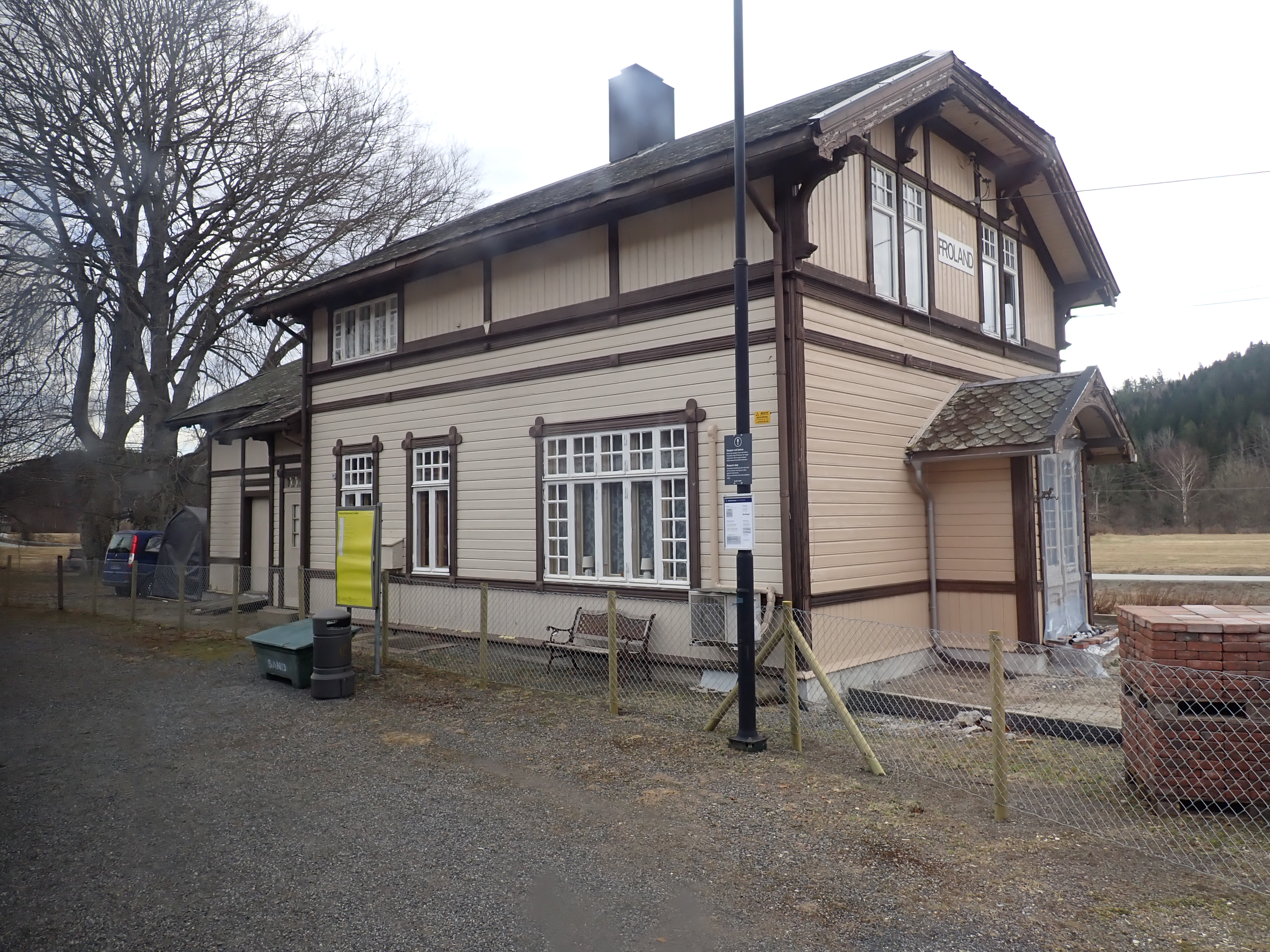
- View of the station

General information
- Location: Froland, Froland Municipality; Norway
- Coordinates: 58.5296°N 08.6536°E
- Elevation: 48.0 m (157.5 ft)
- System: Railway station
- Owner: Bane NOR
- Operator: Go-Ahead Norge
- Line: Arendalsbanen
- Distance: 299.51 km (186.11 mi) (Oslo S); 18.10 km (11.25 mi) (Arendal)
- Platforms: 1

Construction
- Parking: 5
- Cycle facilities: No
- Architect: Paul Armin Due

History
- Opened: 1908
Location

Froland Station (Norwegian: Froland holdeplass) is a railway station in the village of Froland which lies along the river Nidelva in Froland Municipality in Agder county, Norway. Located along the Arendalsbanen railway line, it is served by Go-Ahead Norge. The station was opened in 1908 as part of Arendal–Åmli Line.

Preceding station		Following station
Blakstad	Arendal Line	Bøylestad
Preceding station	Local trains	Following station
Blakstad	Arendal Line	Bøylestad
