= Flaten (disambiguation) =

Flaten may refer to:

== Places ==
=== Norway ===
- Flaten, Norway, a village in the municipality of Åmli in Aust-Agder county, Norway
- Flaten Station, a railway station in the village of Flaten in Åmli municipality, Aust-Agder county, Norway

=== Sweden ===
- Flaten, a lake in Stockholm, Sweden
- Flaten (district), a district in Stockholm, Sweden

== People ==
- Bertel Flaten (1900–1963), a Norwegian politician for the Liberal Party
- Ingebrigt Håker Flaten (born 1971), a Norwegian jazz musician and bassist
- Robert A. Flaten (1934–2025), an American diplomat
- Torgunn Flaten, a Norwegian singer/songwriter
