= Torbjørnsbu Station =

Railway station in Arendal, Norway

Torbjørnsbu

General information
- Location: Torbjørnsbu, Arendal Municipality; Norway
- Coordinates: 58.46522°N 8.74842°E
- Elevation: 21.2 m (70 ft)
- Owner: Norwegian State Railways
- Line: Arendal Line
- Distance: 316.23 km (196.50 mi) (Oslo S); 1.40 km (0.87 mi) (Arendal)
- Platforms: 1

History
- Opened: 1 May 1911
Location

Torbjørnsbu Station (Norwegian: Torbjørnsbu stoppested) is a former railway station at Torbjørnsbu in Arendal Municipality, Norway. Located on the Arendal Line, it was operated by the Norwegian State Railways. The station was opened on 1 May 1911 and originally consisted of a station building and a loading spur. The station remained staffed until 1939 and was later closed.

== Facilities and service ==
The station is 1.40 kilometers (0.87 mi) from Arendal Station at 21.2 meters (70 ft) above mean sea level, and 316.23 kilometers (196.50 mi) from Oslo Central Station. It was located at the western mouth of Barbu Tunnel.

== History ==
Plans for a station in the area started for a spur to be built near the western mouth of the Barbu Tunnel, at Myrene, to store rolling stock. The plans were then expanded to include a station, which opened on 1 May 1911. A station building, designed by Harald Kaas and which is identical to the one at Rossedalen Station, was built. Additional spurs and a longer platform were built in 1917 and 1918. However, there has never been a passing loop at the station. It became unstaffed in 1939 and later closed.

Preceding station		Following station
Arendal	Arendal Line	Stoa
