= Blakstad Station =

Railway station in Froland, Norway

Blakstad Station Blakstad holdeplass
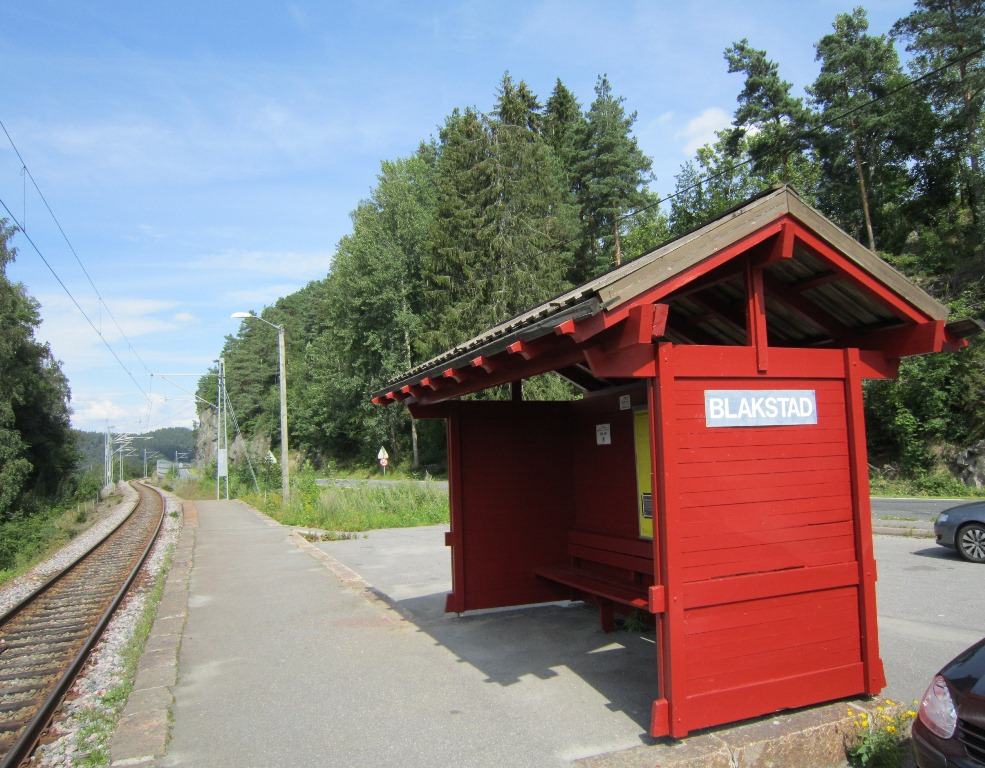
- View of the station

General information
- Location: Blakstad, Froland Municipality; Norway
- Coordinates: 58.5074°N 08.6487°E
- Elevation: 15.0 m (49.2 ft)
- System: Railway station
- Owner: Bane NOR
- Operator: Go-Ahead Norge
- Line: Arendalsbanen
- Distance: 302.50 km (187.96 mi) (Oslo S); 15.12 km (9.40 mi) (Arendal)
- Platforms: 1
- Connections: Taxi and bus

Construction
- Structure type: Covered shelter
- Parking: 10
- Cycle facilities: No

History
- Opened: 1989
Location

Blakstad Station (Norwegian: Blakstad holdeplass) is a railway station in the village of Blakstad on the east side of the river Nidelva in Froland Municipality in Agder county, Norway. Located along the Arendalsbanen railway line, it is served by the Go-Ahead Norge.

The station was opened in 1989 to replace three stations: the Old Blakstad Station about 1 kilometre (0.62 mi) further south, the Blakstad Bridge Station about 300 metres (980 ft) south, and the Hurv Station about 700 metres (2,300 ft) to the north.

Preceding station		Following station
Rise	Arendal Line	Froland
Preceding station	Local trains	Following station
Rise	Arendal Line	Froland
