= Class 21 =

Class 21 or 21 Class may refer to:

- Atlantic 21-class lifeboat
- Belgian Railways Class 21, Belgian electric locomotive
- British Rail Class 21 (NBL), British diesel-electric locomotive
- British Rail Class 21 (MaK), various locomotives used by Eurotunnel
- GS&WR Class 21
- Hormuz 21-class landing ship
- L&YR Class 21, British 0-4-0ST steam locomotive
- NSB Class 21, Norwegian 2-6-0 steam locomotive
- O 21-class submarine
- P21-class patrol vessel
- PKP class ET21
- South African Class 21 2-10-4, South African steam locomotive

== See also ==
- Type 21 (disambiguation)
