= Johan Frøstrup =

Norwegian judge and politician

Johan Henrik Kintzell Frøstrup (11 December 1852 – 20 May 1929) was a Norwegian judge and politician for the Conservative Party

He was born in Barbu. He was mayor of Arendal Municipality from 1896 to 1900, and then sat as a representative for the constituency Arendal og Grimstad in the Parliament of Norway from 1900 to 1903. In 1902, he was appointed stipendiary magistrate in Skien. He supported Arendal Station being located in Barbu instead of Kittelsbukt. He died in May 1929.
