= Flaten, Norway =

Village in Åmli Municipality, Norway

Flaten
- Village
- Interactive map of Flaten
- Coordinates: 58.6364°N 08.6813°E
- Country: Norway
- Region: Southern Norway
- County: Agder
- District: Østre Agder
- Municipality: Åmli Municipality
- Elevation: 140 m (460 ft)
- Time zone: UTC+01:00 (CET)
  - Summer (DST): UTC+02:00 (CEST)
- Post Code: 4868 Selåsvatn

Flaten is a village in Åmli Municipality in Agder county, Norway. It is located along the river Nidelva, about 4 kilometres (2.5 mi) southeast of the village of Nelaug. The population (2001) of Flaten was 32. The village has a railway station, Flaten Station, which is part of the Arendalsbanen railway line.
