= Type 21 =

Type 21 can refer to:

- Type 21 frigate, or Amazon-class frigate, a late-20th-century escort vessel of the Royal Navy.
- Type 021-class missile boat, a Chinese missile-firing naval vessel first produced in about 1975, and still in production.
- Type XXI submarine, a German technologically advanced submarine produced in 1945.
- Type 21 Radar, a radar of the Imperial Japanese Navy

== See also ==
- Class 21 (disambiguation)
