= NSB Class IV =

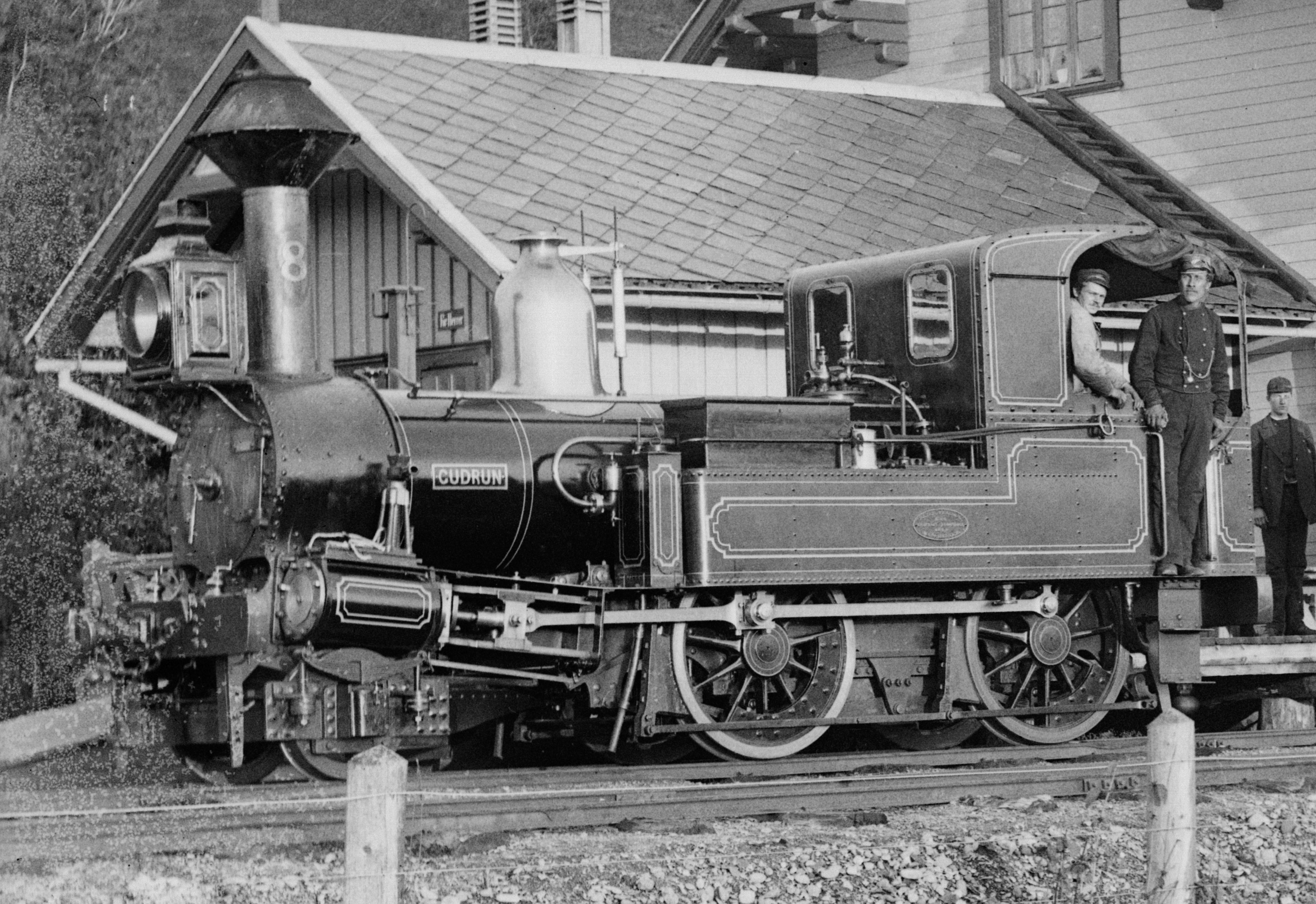
8 Cudrun at Melhus station (cropped image).

The NSB (Norwegian State Railways) Class IV (as in the number four, or "fire" in Norwegian) or Tryggve Class was a class of 1,067 mm (3 ft 6 in) narrow gauge 2-4-0T steam locomotives built by Beyer, Peacock & Company in Manchester, England. The 3 ft (914 mm) gauge Beyer Peacock locomotives built for the Isle of Man Railway strongly resemble this design.
