= NSB Class 21 =

Class of Norwegian steam locomotives

NSB type 21
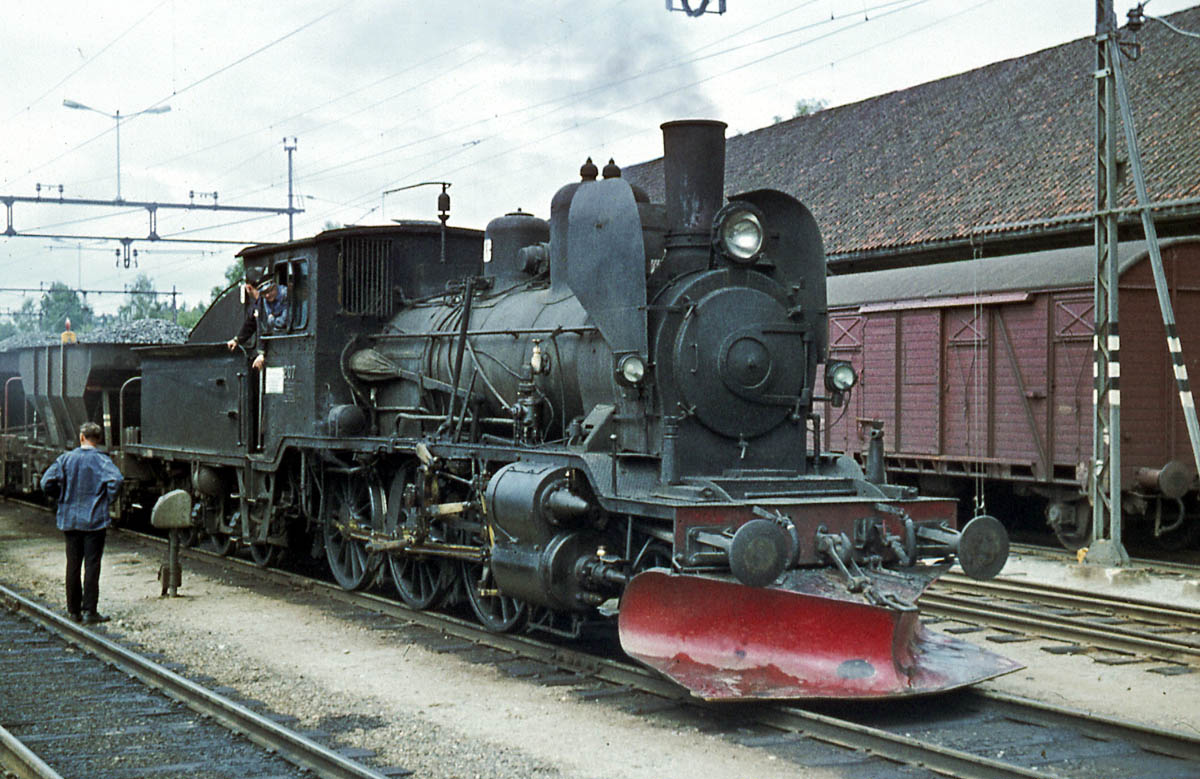
Type and origin
- Power type: Steam
- Builder: NOHAB, Hamar, Thune
- Build date: 1904 - 1917
- Total produced: 42
Specifications
- Configuration
  - Whyte: 2-6-0
  - UIC: 1'C-3
- Gauge: 4 ft 8 1/2 in (1,435 mm) standard gauge
- Driver dia.: 1,448 mm (4 ft 9.0 in)
- Wheelbase: 3,352 mm (11 ft 0 in)
- Length: 14,432 mm (47 ft 4.2 in)
- Fuel type: Coal
- Fuel capacity: 3 t (3.3 short tons; 3.0 long tons)
- Water cap.: 7.7 m^{3} (1,700 imp gal)
- Boiler pressure: 12 bar (170 psi)
- Cylinders: 2
Performance figures
- Maximum speed: Forward: 60 km/h (37 mph); Reverse: 45 km/h (28 mph)
- Tractive effort: 18,560 lbf (82.56 kN)
Career
- Operators: Norwegian State Railways
- Numbers: 146, 149–150, 174–183, 201–209, 224–225, 237, 251–253, 294–295, 312–315, 370–377
- Withdrawn: 1971
- Preserved: 5 (207, 225, 252, 376 and 377)

The NSB type 21 was a standard gauge locomotive, suitable for lightly laid lines (10–11 tonnes axle load), introduced in 1904 for the rebuilt Bergen-Vossbanen, and was in use until NSB phased out steam in 1970–71.

== The original three variants ==
The class 21 was one of NSB's most numerous steam locomotive types, With 42 locomotives divided into three subtypes, 21a, 21b and 21c.

=== 21A, a continuation of type 15c ===
The locomotives of type 21a were delivered to Vossebanen and are mostly similar to the type 15c . Due to the Vossebahn's many sharp curves, especially the harbour tracks in Bergen, the fixed wheelbase had to be reduced from 12ft 6in (3810 mm) on the type 15c to 10ft 11.97in (3352 mm), and the boiler had to be raised 5.2in (13.4 cm) so the firebox could fit between the two rear driving wheels. This change was significant enough that it was decided to give these locomotives a separate type designation - type 21.

The first five locomotives No. 174-178 were ordered in 1902 from Thune, and delivered in July 1904. They were transported in parts by boat from Kristiania to Bergen. The locomotives were to be used in all kinds of traffic, except for the local traffic near Bergen, a tank engine of type 20a class was used for that work. The precursor type 15 class (and type 11 class before that) was originally intended as a goods locomotive, but also proved to be well suited for ordinary passenger trains. One can therefore say that type 21 was an all-round locomotive. The locomotive were a successful on the Vosse Railway, because in 1904 and 1905 a further five locomotives were ordered for the railway, which were delivered in 1905 and 1906.

As a result of the construction of the Bergensbanen as a standard gauge line, the Vossebanen had to be converted to a standard gauge. For the same reason, the Randsfjord Railway had to be converted to standard gauge and this had to be completed by 1909 for the opening of the Bergen Railway. The Randsfjord railway was a reasonably flat railway and type 21 was considered very suitable. On 9 April 1908, six locomotives of type 21a were ordered from Thune for the Randfjord railway (no. 201-206), and the locomotives were delivered just over a year later. However, the fact that the Randsfjord line was to be converted to standard gauge line did not mean that the line from Vikersund to Krøderen was converted to standard gauge. On the contrary, it was first thought that it could continue as the narrow-gauge railway, thereby saving some money. Eventually it was realized that such an isolated narrow-gauge line was such a good idea, and on 5 August 1908 the Storting's railway committee decided that the Krøderbanen should also be converted to standard gauge, after the government had given the go-ahead for this. This meant that one more standard-gauge locomotive was needed, and what was to become locomotive no. 207 was ordered for the Krøder Railway, and delivered in 1909.

A further three locomotives of type 21a were ordered in 1908 and 1909 for Solørbanen (no. 146) and Gudbrandsdalsbanen (no. 149-150), and delivered in 1909 and 1910.

A total of 20 locomotives were built of type 21a

=== 21B, NSB's first superheater locomotive type ===
With the introduction of superheaters the coal savings were greater than using saturated steam locomotives. The NSB wanted to try the new technology, and the Randsfjord Railway needed an additional two locomotives for its standard gauge in 1909. A month after 201-206 were ordered, NSB ordered two more locomotives of type 21, but this time with superheaters. The new locomotive type received the designation 21b. The NSB wanted to gain experience with these locomotives before ordering more superheated locomotives, and the next three 21 locomotives were saturated steam locomotives of type 21a, no. 146, 149–150 as described in the previous chapter. After this, only superheater locomotives of type 21 were ordered. A total of 14 locomotives of type 21b were delivered between 1908 and 1919. Besides 208 and 209 for the Randsfjord Railway, these were locomotives for the Smaalens Railway (no. 224, 225, 237. 251-252, 295, 312-313, Kongsvingerbanen (no. 253, 314-315) and Meråkerbanen (no. 294).

=== 21C, superheater locomotive with feedwater preheaters ===
In order to improve fuel economy, feedwater preheaters became popular for a period from the First World War onwards. When the boiler needs more water, the water is injected into the boiler from the water tank. This water is cold compared to the water in the boiler. Bringing cold water into a hot boiler means that the boiler water is cooled down somewhat, and thus the steam pressure also drops slightly. If you preheat the water and then inject it at a higher temperature it would be more beneficial for the total fuel consumption. Knorr feedwater preheaters heated the steam through a container which is filled with steam from the boiler, and then it was injected into the boiler by a small pump.

A series of eight type 21 locomotives were ordered from the Swedish Nydquist & Holm (NOHAB) in 1918, and these were equipped with feedwater preheaters. They were delivered in 1919, given the numbers 370-377, and because of the feedwater preheater, they were designated type 21c. Because these locomotives were fitted with feedwater preheater they were almost 2 tonnes heavier.

However, the preheater was a complicated device that required a lot of maintenance. The disadvantage of this turned out to be greater than the gain in coal consumption, and therefore it was decided to remove most of the preheater from the locomotives, without this resulting in the locomotives changing their type designation.

== Rebuild type 21d and 21e ==
The superheater device was simple and robust, and produced significant savings. Depending on how much you superheat the steam, it could provide from 15% to 36% savings in steam consumption, by superheating to 250 and 400 °C. This corresponded to a saving in coal consumption of 6% and 21%. NSB therefore wanted to rebuild the newer saturated steam locomotives. The Type 21a belonged to that group, and 11 of these locomotives were rebuilt from the 1920s onwards, some through two stages. One locomotive, no. 182, was completely converted to a type 21b superheater locomotive after the locomotive had been destroyed in the Nidareid accident in 1921. The rest were converted to type 21d and/or 21e.

=== 21D, Compound superheater ===
The conversion started with six 21a locomotives (146, 149, 175, 176, 202, 207) getting superheater boilers, but remaining compounded locomotives. This happened in 1923-25.

=== 21E, twin overheads with external inflow ===
The rebuilding of the 21a to 21d was thus only half done. The slide is the device that distributes the steam between the front and back of the piston and partly lets fresh steam into the cylinder, partly lets used steam out through the chimney. On saturated steam locomotives with a relatively low temperature of the steam, a so-called flat slide valve had been used. When temperature and pressure increase, the flat slide valve became more difficult to move. It was decided to switch to a round slide valve instead. When a 21a locomotive was rebuilt to a 21d and kept the compounding system, they also kept the flat slide valve. This however was a poor decision. Because only after a few years it was decided to rebuild the 21d locomotives with circular slide valves and two same-sized cylinder, as the additional equipment with the compound arrangement was deemed not to be cost-effective enough when compared to superheating. By constructing the round slide valves slightly differently to the 21b locomotives, namely with external instead of internal steam inflow, more of the original construction could be retained. This gave rise to type 21e, which differs from type 21b with the opposite steam inflow into the cylinders, which also gave the locomotives a slightly different external appearance on the cylinders. The cylinders on type 21e are more curved than on 21b.

The rebuilding took place in two stages. The first locomotive to be rebuilt was no. 177 which was rebuilt in 1927 directly from 21a. Next followed nos.146, 175, 176, 202 and 207 in 1928 and 1929, all from type 21d. Between 1941 and 1948, three locomotives (nos.150, 203, 205) were converted from 21a to 21e. This makes a total of 9 locomotives that made up the type 21e.

== Technical Data ==
	21a	21b	21c	21d	21e
Cyl size	16.7in (452mm) / 25in (635mm)	17in (432mm)		17in (432mm) / 24.6in (625mm)	17in (432mm)
Stroke	24in (610mm)	24in (610mm)		24in (610mm)	24in (610mm)
	21a	21b	21c	21d	21e
Firegrate area	13.5 sq ft (1.26 m2)	13.5 sq ft (1.26 m2)			
Heating surface	841 sq ft (78.1 m2)	682.4 sq ft (63.4 m2)			
Superheater erea	-	175.4 sq ft (16.3 m2)			
	21a	21b	21c	21d	21e
Adhesion weight	27.9 long tons (31.2 short tons or 28.3 t)	28.1 long tons (31.5 short tons; 28.6t)	29.2 long tons (32.7 short tons; 29.7t)	31.2 Long tons (34.9 short tons; 31.7t)	30.3 Long tons (34.9 short tons; 30.8t)
Service weight	58.0 long tons (64.9 short tons or 58.9t)	58.2 long tons (65.1 short tons or 59.1)	59.9 long tons (67.1 short tons or 60.9t)	60.9 long tons (68.2 short tons or 61.9t)	61.5 long tons (68.9 short tons or 62.5t)
Loco weight	33.0 long tons (36.9 short tons or 33.5t)	33.0 long tons (36.9 short tons or 33.5t)	34.7 long tons (38.9 short tons or 35.3t)	36.3 long tons (40.7 short tons or 36.9t)	35.7 long tons (40.0 short tons or 36.3t)
Tender weight	11.7 long tons (13.1 short tons or 11.9t)				

== Phasing out of the saturated steam locomotives ==
Not all 21a locomotives were rebuilt. This is due to the fact that rail traffic was declining during parts of the interwar period, and a number of locomotives were put aside, especially the saturated steam locomotives. There was thus far no need for all the locomotives of a smaller size, and the type 21 was a locomotive type for light or short trains, used in particular on tracks that could not withstand heavier locomotives. With the Second World War, traffic increased dramatically again, but then there was no time and money for expensive reconstructions. Put aside saturated steam locomotives were put back into service again, and allowed to go on in the state they were in at the time, or they remained put aside until they were fully withdrawn and scrapped. In the first years after the war, the locomotive fleet was so run down that almost every engine had to be kept working or put back into traffic, and once again expensive rebuilds were postponed on locomotives that were assumed to have a few years of operation left.

Eight 21a locomotives were never rebuilt. Four of these (nos.178, 180, 181, 204) were set aside before the war, the first (no. 178) already in 1929. None of these came back into service again, but these were scrapped after being put into storage for 10–15 years. The remaining four (nos.174, 179, 183 and 205) were in service until the early 1950s, but were all scrapped by the end of 1955.

== The superheater locomotives ==
While all the saturated steam locomotives had been scrapped by 1955, the first superheated locomotive was scrapped in 1956. The "Steam Away" program had begun, and thus began a general replacement of steam locomotives with diesel locomotives, shift from steam to diesel and electric locomotives was made as entire stretches of track were electrified. The amount of type 21 locomotives gradually decreased, but despite the fact that these were small and light machines, or perhaps precisely because of this, the number of type 21 locomotives went down quite slowly. Because there were still many lines that couldn't permit locomotives with a higher axle load, and the type 21 locomotives were excellent for the often small traffic these lines had. The last line the type 21 saw regular service on was the Numedalsbanen. The weekly goods train ran with type 21 locomotives until May 1970, and the so-called Svene pukku normally used type 21 locomotives until autumn 1970. These trains were the last regularly steam-hauled trains on the NSB. The Type 21 became the last steam locomotive type used by NSB for ordinary train operation. In 1969 there were still seven type 21 locomotives on NSB's books.

== Incidents ==
On 7 March 1976, no. 377 "King Haakon VII" was near Loughborough Central on the preserved Great Central Railway when a fusible plug blew out of the locomotive's boiler into the firebox. This caused steam, boiling water and burning coal to be jettisoned through the firehole into the locomotive cab, causing serious injuries to two of the four footplate crew. The cause of the incident was determined to be that the fusible plug was fitted by an unqualified person using unsuitable tools for the work.

== Preserved locomotives ==
Because so many locomotives of type 21 were in service right up to the end of steam on the NSB, many of them have been preserved.

Number	Type	Name	Status	Current location	Notes	Image
207	21e	-	Stored	Krøderbanen museum railway	No. 207 was ordered for the Krøderbanen, it was one of the most common locomotives in use on the Numedalsbanen in 1970. This locomotive derailed and overturned in Bevergrenda 4 km north of Kongsberg on 1 October 1963. It was later sold to the Norwegian Railway Museum, but was deposited with the Norwegian Railway Club and is kept in one of the warehouses on the Krøderbanen museum railway.	
225	21b	-	Operational	Krøderbanen museum railway	No. 255 was one of the other steam locomotives for Numedalsbanen's freight and gravel trains in 1970. It was sent for scrap in 1971, but was bought by members of the Norwegian Railway Club. After many years of restoration work to bring the locomotive back to almost similar to its original appearance, it was restored to working condition in 1982 and then used until 1995 on the Krøderbanen and various other railways. The locomotive was then put into storage, it had an overhaul in 2009 and put back into service. The locomotive was taken out of service after the 2013 season due to leaks. The locomotive was taken into the workshop for complete overhaul. Among other things, a new boiler has been fitted, which was originally planned for 21b 252. In 2022, the locomotive was ready for service again.	
252	21b	-	Under overhaul	Krøderbanen museum railway	No. 252 also belonged to the Numedalsbane locomotives and was in use on the Norsk Jernbaneklubb's first excursion train with a steam locomotive, to the Krøderbanen in October 1970. The locomotive was then transferred to the Norwegian Technical Museum, but the Norsk Jernbaneklubb obtained a disposition agreement for the locomotive from 1973 and used it for various assignments until 1977, when the boiler failed the inspection for an overhaul. A new boiler was later built, but the locomotive is currently in bits. The new boiler that was built for 252 was instead used on no. 225 when it got a new boiler during its overhaul..	
376	21c	Norwegian	Under overhaul	Kent & East Sussex Railway	No. 376 was used for snow clearing on the Namsos railway until the winter of 1971. In the spring it went to Oslo, because the locomotive had been sold to the railway Kent & East Sussex Railway, where it is still located under the designation "No. 19 Norwegian".	
377	21c	King Haakon	Static display	Bressingham Steam Museum	No. 377 was also one of the Numedalsbane locomotives at the end. It was also sold to England, painted apple green and given the name "King Haakon VII", apparently because it was - wrongly - believed that it was this locomotive that pulled the train with King Haakon out of Oslo on 9 April 1940. The locomotive was put into service at Great Central Railway in 1973 until 1977 when it was withdrawn for boiler work. The locomotive was purchased in 1986 by Bressingham Steam and Gardens in Norfolk. The locomotive is currently out of service.	

== Gallery ==
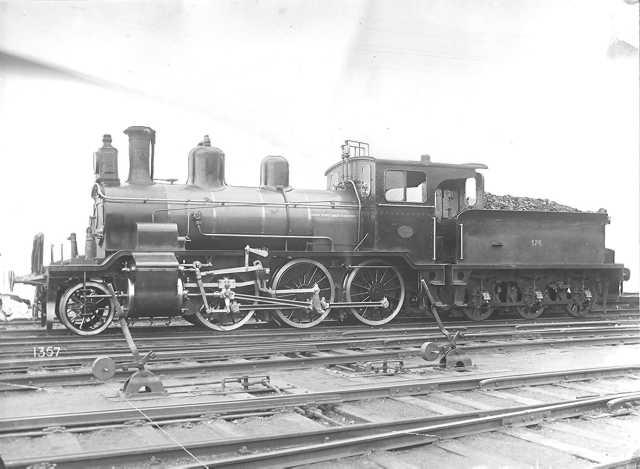
No. 174 (21a) as delivered in 1904

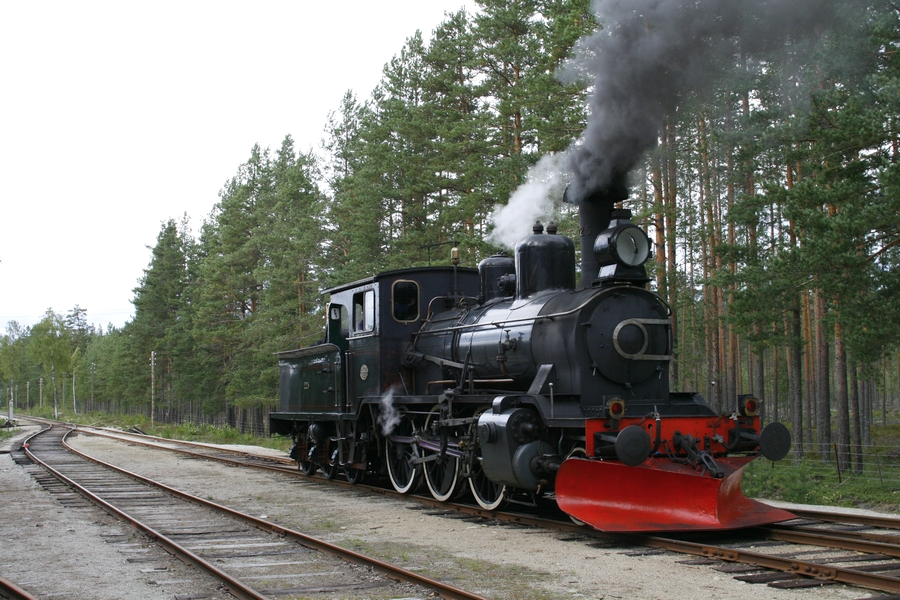
No. 225 at Kløftefoss station

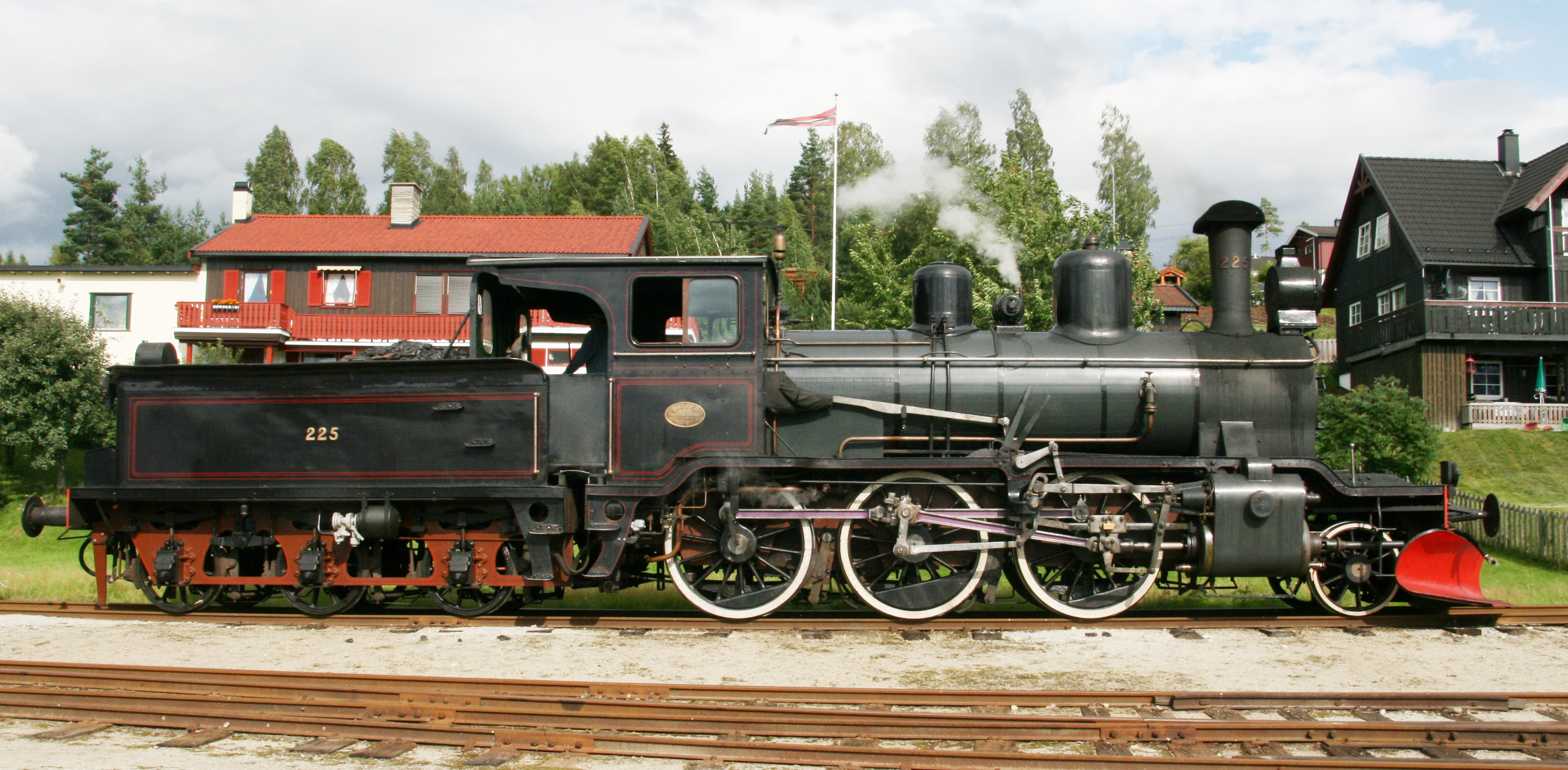
No. 225 on the Krøderbanen railway

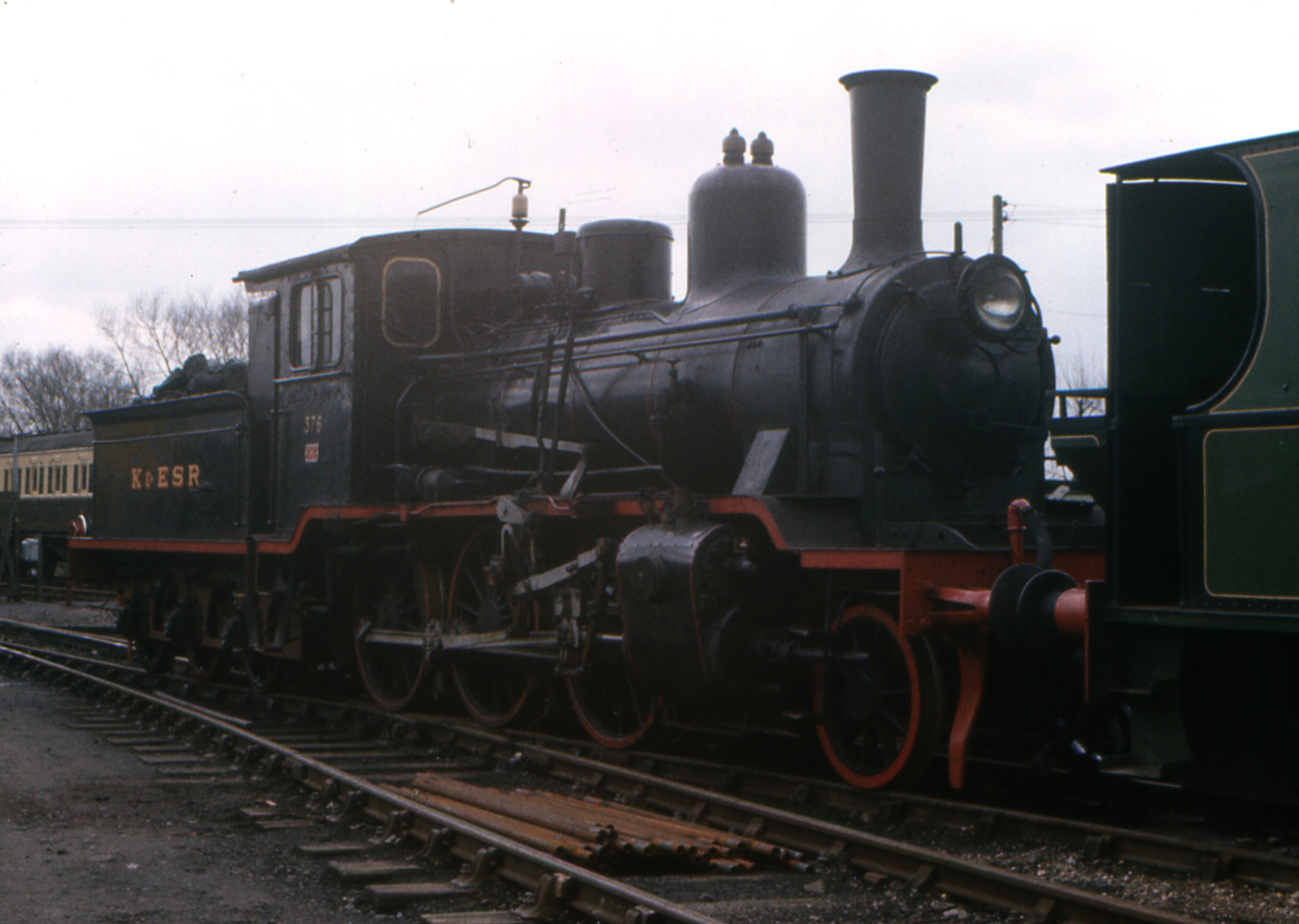
No. 376 in the yard at Bodiam in the 1970s

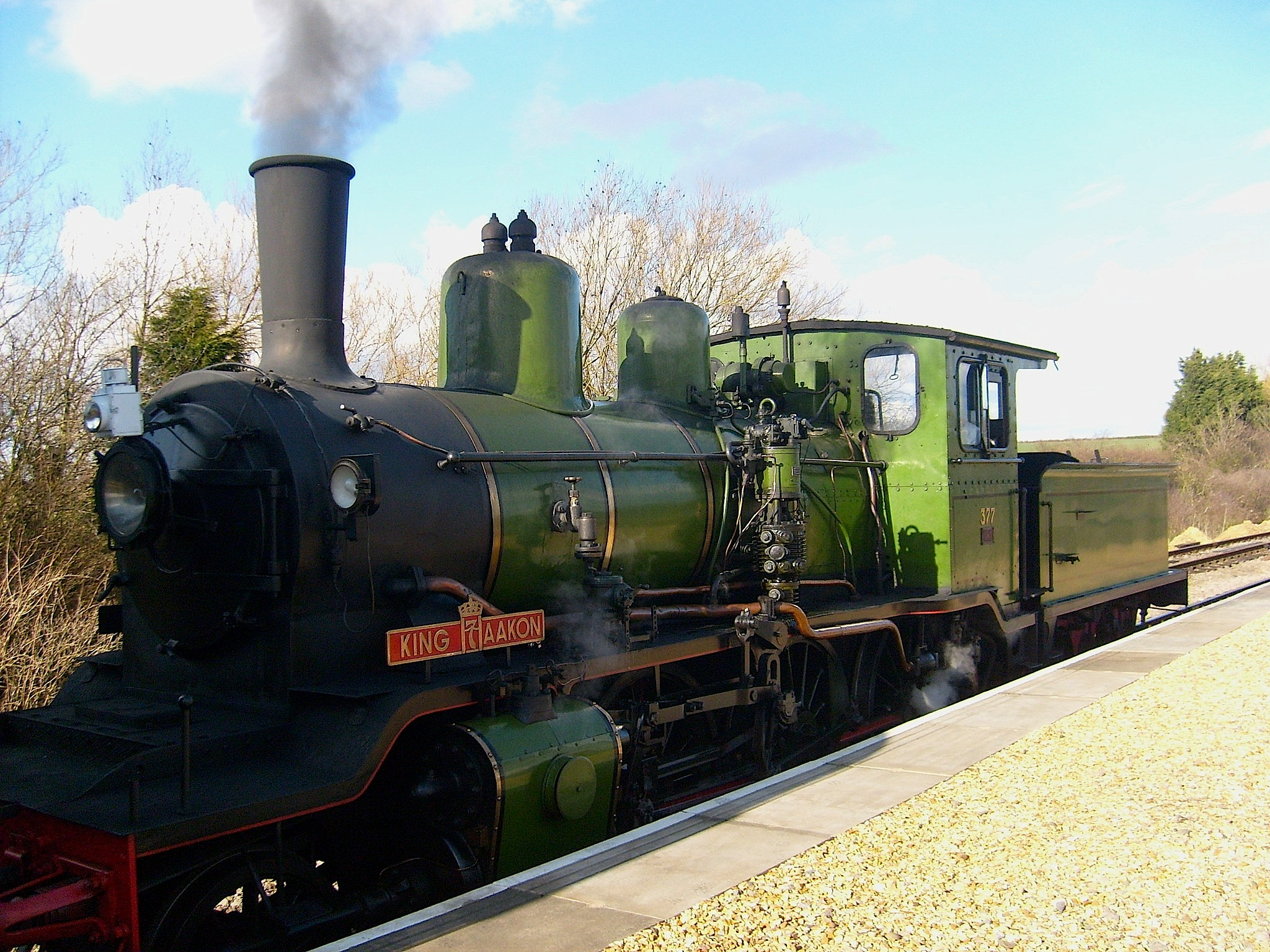
No. 377 at the NVR
