= Harald Kaas =

Norwegian architect (1868–1953)

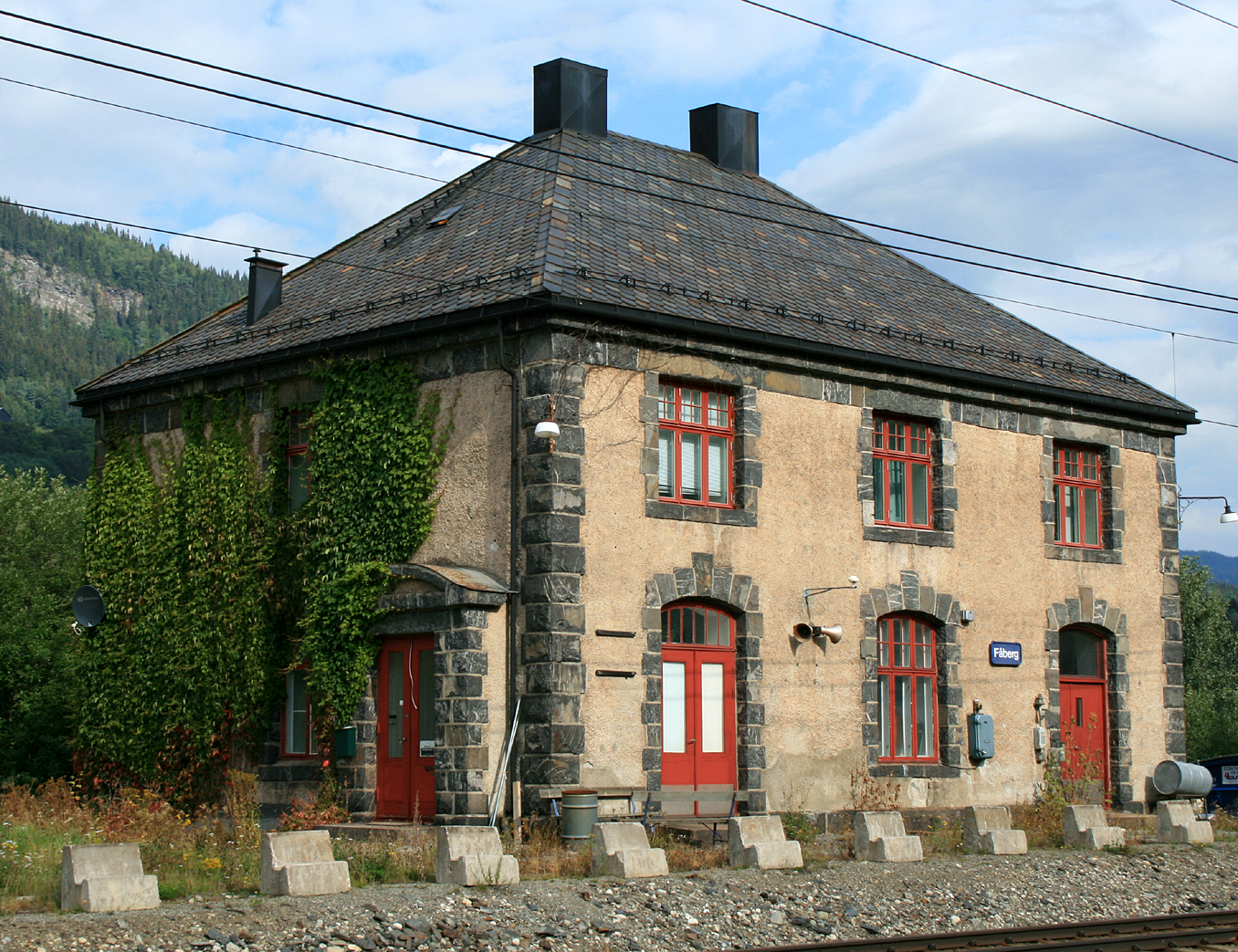
Fåberg Station

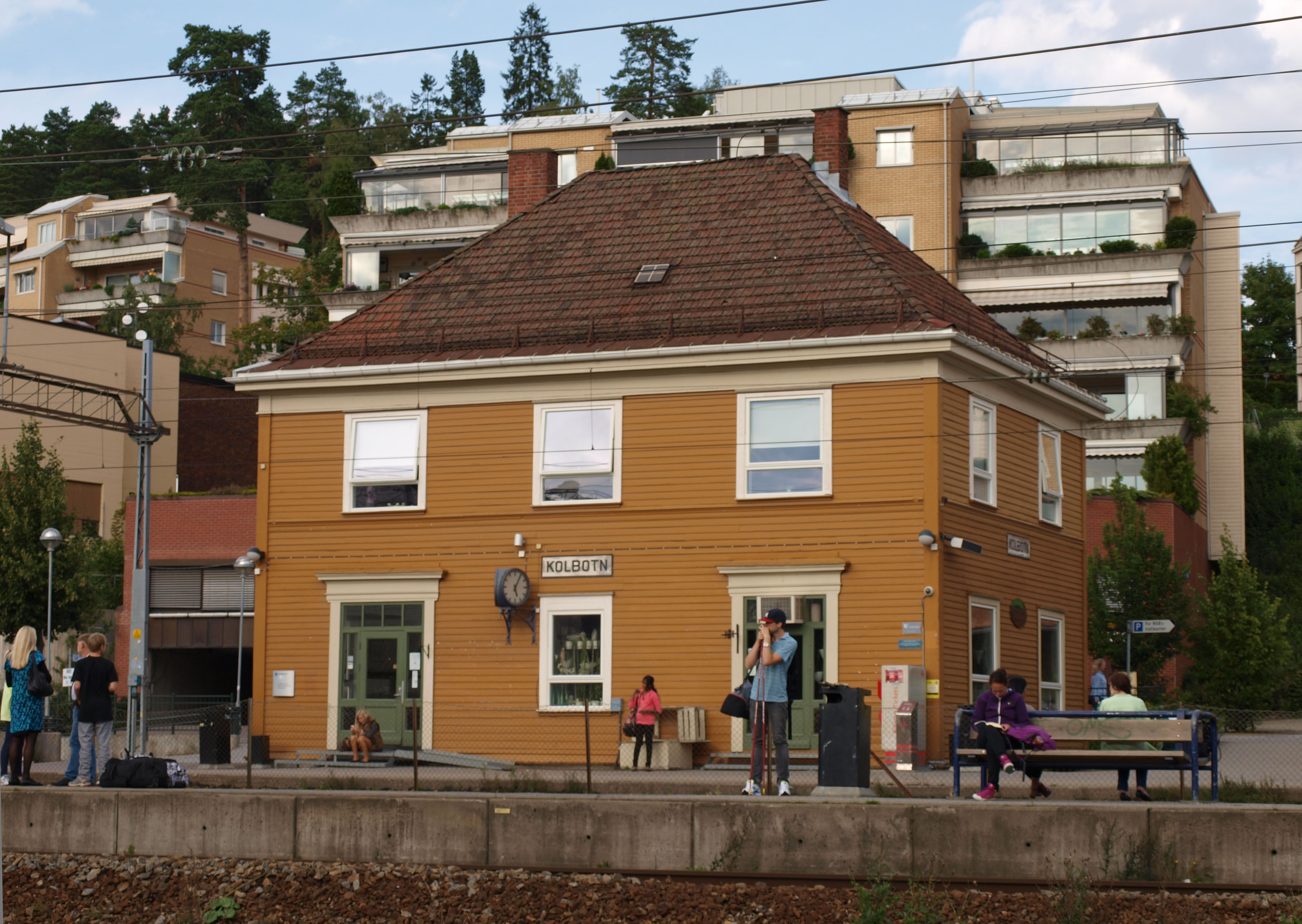
Kolbotn Station

Harald Kaas (19 May 1868 – 5 December 1953) was a Norwegian architect.

Kaas was born in Christiania (now Oslo), Norway. He studied at the Norwegian National Academy of Craft and Art Industry, then at Baugewerkschule in Eckernförde and finally at Polytechnicum in Munich.

He worked for a couple of years in the Colony of Natal in South Africa. He was employed by the Norwegian State Railways from 1908 to 1914, and designed stations on the Arendal Line, Bergen Line and Solør Line for the company. Kaas died on 5 December 1953 and was buried on 20 May 1954 at Vår Frelsers gravlund in Oslo.

== Selected works ==
- Vestfossen Station on Sørlandsbanen (1871)
- Fåberg Station on Dovrebanen (1894)
- Kolbotn Station on Østfoldbanen (1895)
