= Arendal station =

Railway station in Arendal, Norway

Arendal
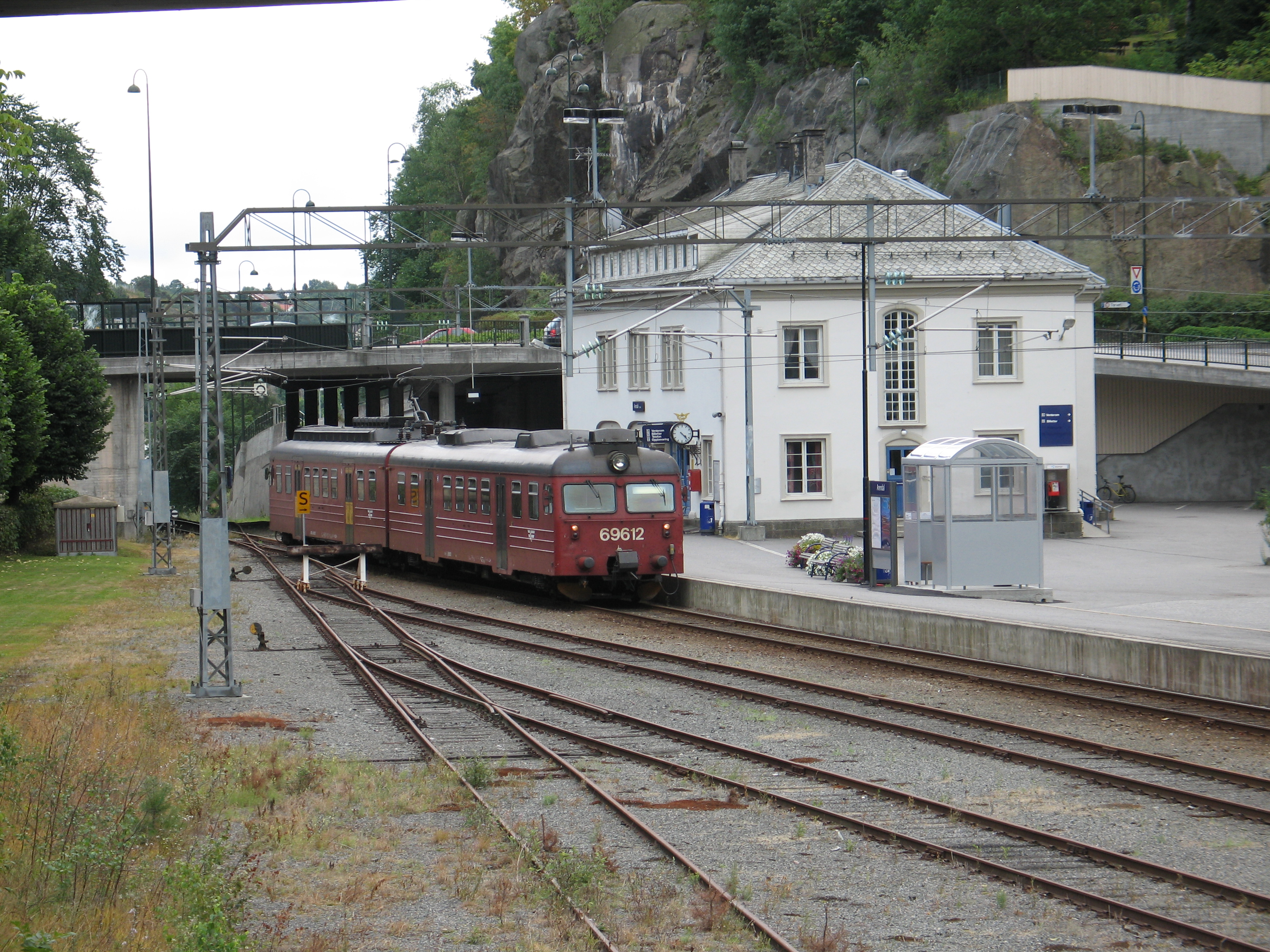
- NSB Class 69 train at Arendal Station

General information
- Location: Arendal, Arendal Municipality; Norway
- Coordinates: 58°27′53″N 8°46′12″E
- Elevation: 7.6 m (25 ft) AMSL
- Owner: Rom Eiendom
- Operator: Go-Ahead Norge
- Line: Arendal Line
- Distance: 317.63 km (197.37 mi)
- Platforms: 1

Construction
- Architect: Paul Armin Due (1908); Gudmund Hoel (1930)

History
- Opened: 23 November 1908
Location

Arendal Station (Norwegian: Arendal stasjon) is the terminus railway station of the Arendal Line, located in the town of Arendal in Arendal Municipality, Norway. The station opened on 23 November 1908 and is served by the Go-Ahead Norge.

== History ==
=== Planning ===
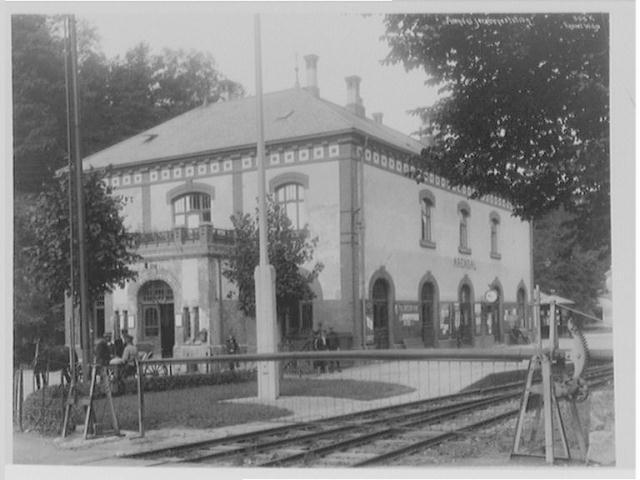
The original station design in 1912, designed by Paul Armin Due

The decision to build the Arendal–Treungen Line was made by Parliament in 1894, although this did not include which route to follow. In 1902, the Norwegian State Railways made six proposals for a route between Arendal and Solbergvann, each with a slightly different station location within Arendal.

The Strømsbu Line would give a station at Strømsbusletten, the Kittelsbukt Line would give a station at Kittelsbukt, the Barbu Line would give a station at Barbudalen, the Gaardal Line would give a station both at Strømsbubukten and Svinodden, the Langsæ Line would also give a station in Barbudalen, and the Holmesland and Lysgaard Line would give a station in the town center for passengers and port and freight station in Barbudalen and Koviken.

The town is surrounded by several hills, which made it difficult to find an ideal route for the Arendal–Treungen Line into town. The first proposal was to build the station outside the town limits, at Strømsbusletten. This was met by strong local opposition and local politicians quickly demanded that the terminus be located within the town borders. The municipal council hired Engineer Sam Eyde to plan a suitable route into town. He proposed filling in Kittelsbukt, a small bay in the town center, which would place the station next to the town square. The alternative would require 161,000 cubic meters (5,700,000 cu ft) of earthwork and would be 313,000 Norwegian krone (NOK) more expensive than the Stømsbusletten alternative.

A consensus was not reached for any alternative, and when Parliament voted on the proposal on 8 June 1903, no decision was made. Arendal's member of parliament, Johan Frøstrup, supported the Barbudalen alternative. He argued that this would make it easy to expand the line, give good transshipment to ships and be advantageous for future industry. After the parliamentarian rejection, the plans were sent back to the Ministry of Labour. In general, engineers and railway officials supported the Barbudalen alternative, while the town and surrounding area's population wanted Kittelsbukt. In 1904, the ministry supported the latter, but by then there was a majority in the Standing Committee on Railways for the Bardbudalen alternative.

In the meantime, Nikolai Prebensen won the parliamentary election in 1903 largely on the grounds that he supported the Kittelsbukt alternative. At the same time, the municipality had agreed to pay NOK 420,000 in local grants for the line, on condition that a station be built at Kittelsbukt. However, such a location would be NOK 238,000 more expensive than in Barbudalen.

In the proposal to parliament, the ministry presented five alternatives: the Barbu Line with stations in Barbudalen and a freight terminal in Barbubukta; the Strømsbu Line, with stations in Strømsbusletten and the port facilities on Svinodden; an alternative Strømsbu Line with stations in Kittelsbukt and Strømsbusletten with the port facilities at Svinodden; and two Kittelsbukt Line proposals with a station at Kittelsbukt and port facilities at Svinodden, one of which was Eyde's proposal.

Prebensen and Minister Hans Christian Albert Hansen supported the Kittelsbukt alternative, while the railway authorities supported the Barbu alternative. The debate in Parliament took place on 13 May with the voting taking place the following day. First the Kittelsbukt alternative lost with 40 against 77 votes. Then a proposal was made whereby Arendal Municipality would have to cover half the extra cost of a station at Kittelsbukt—52 representatives supported this, 65 opposed it. Finally, the Barbu alternative was unanimously supported.

=== Construction ===
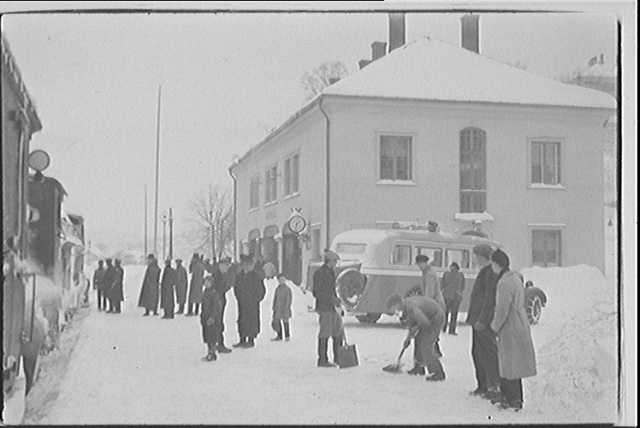
The station in 1936

The station building and most of the auxiliary buildings were designed in jugendstil by Paul Armin Due, who also designed the stations in Rise, Blakstad and Froland. The station building at Arendal was equipped with a waiting room, a dispatching room and offices in the ground floor and a residential area for the station master in the upper floor. The station also received a freight house, an out building with a workshop, carriage shed, a roundhouse with roof for four locomotives, a coal shed, a turntable and a water tower. NSB also bought a residence for the district manager in 1919, but this was sold after the position was moved to Kristiansand.

The roundhouse began use in 1910 and the workshop in 1912. Following the expansion of the line to Treungen in 1912, the freight house was made 9 meters (30 ft) longer, another outhouse was built and the workshop expanded. Two additional tracks were also laid at the station. The original station building had an insufficient foundation, as a log raft had been used. By the late 1920s, the building had sunk 70 centimeters (28 in). In 1929 and 1930, the station building and the outhouse was demolished and rebuilt with a new foundation, this time using piles to create a deep foundation. The new station building was designed by Gudmund Hoel of NSB Arkitektselskap. It used the old building's materials as much as possible and had the same dimensions.

From 20 October 1935, the narrow gauge track was converted to standard gauge. From 9 November, Arendal Station became a temporary terminus for the Sørland Line, as the line was completed to Nelaug and connected the Arendal Line. While terminus for the Sørland Line, Arendal experienced a larger increase in traffic, as all transport to the South Coast went through the town. On 21 June 1938, the Sørland Line between Nelaug and Grovane opened, and the Arendal Line became a branch.

The turntable had a 15-meter (49 ft) radius and was equipped with an electric motor at the end of the 1940s. It later also received a wooden decking which covered the pit. The freight house was rebuilt in 1952 and the tracks around it relaid. However, it was destroyed in a fire on 10 April 1970, caused by a package of firecrackers going off. The building was rebuilt and leased to Linjegods. After they started using a new building, the freight house was torn down in 1986.

The line was converted to electric traction, which came into use on 15 June 1995. From July 1997, NSB terminated the night train from Arendal because of lack of rolling stock. From 20 October, the service was terminated on the Arendal Line and the Bratsberg Line. NSB had a serious shortage of motormen, and chose to close operations on the lines with least traffic to allocate sufficient personnel to areas with higher ridership. Traffic resumed on 24 June 2001.

Preceding station		Following station
Terminus	Arendal Line	Stoa; Torbjørnsbu
Preceding station	Local trains	Following station
Terminus	Arendal Line	Stoa
