= Paul Armin Due =

Norwegian architect

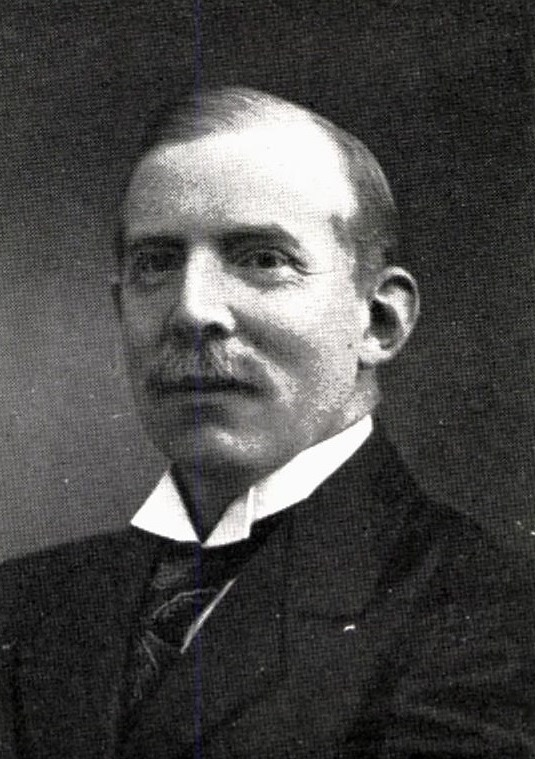
Paul Armin Due

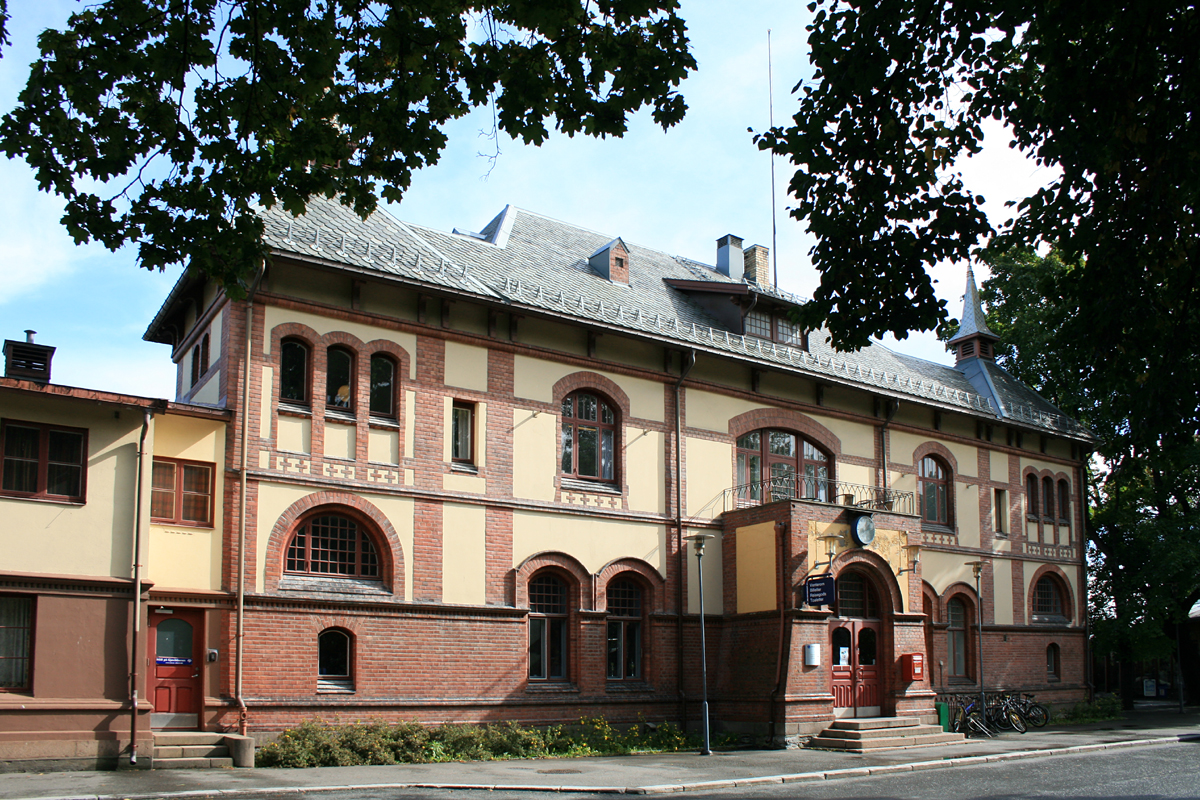
Gjøvik Railroad Station

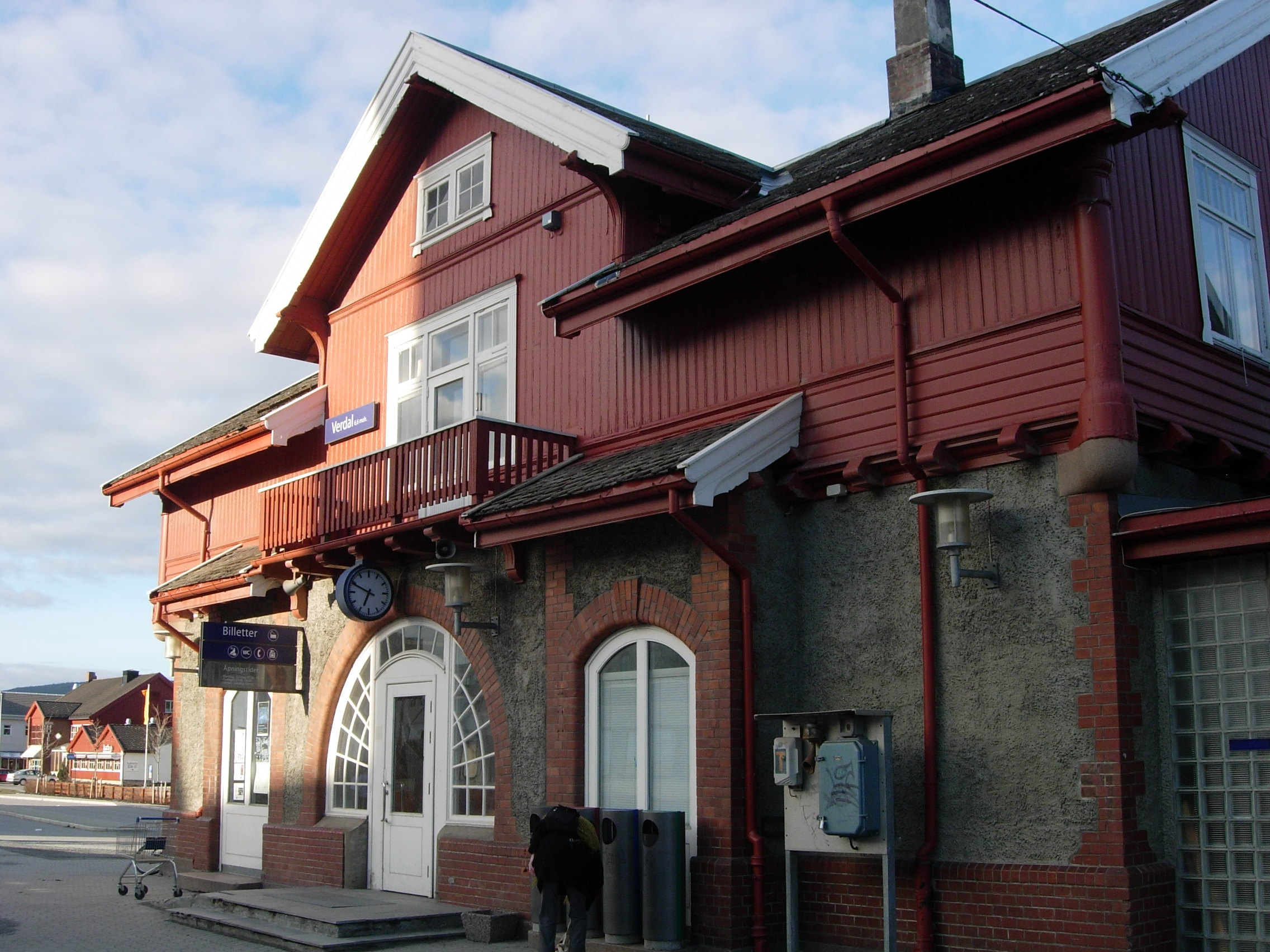
Verdal Railroad Station

Paul Armin Due (1870–1926) was a Norwegian architect

Paul Franz Wilhelm Armin Due was the son the renowned architect Paul Due. He graduated from Leibniz University Hannover in 1896 and spent two years working in Germany before returning to Norway to work for his father's architecture firm. The firm was at that time particularly engaged in the design of station buildings for the State railways. Until 1910 he designed a number of the stations built by the Norwegian State Railways, including virtually all stations north of Levanger Station on Hell–Sunnanbanen and many stations on Bergensbanen, including all those in Hallingdal. His stations are predominantly Jugendstil and simple North-German new renaissance.

Paul Armin Due established an independent architectural practice in Christiania in 1911, and carried out several villas in Aker Municipality. From 1916, he worked for the city of Christiania.
