= Go-Ahead Nordic =

Norwegian railway operator

- Industry: Rail transport
- Founded: 19 May 2016
- Defunct: 2027
- Headquarters: Oslo, Norway
- Number of employees: 283 (2026)
- Parent: Go-Ahead Group
- Website: go-aheadnordic.no

Go-Ahead Nordic is a railway operator in Norway that commenced operations in December 2019. It is a subsidiary of the Go-Ahead Group.

== History ==
In October 2018, Go-Ahead Nordic was awarded an eight-year contract by the Norwegian Railway Directorate to operate the Oslo South package, consisting of three routes operated by Vy beating off competition from SJ Norge and Vy with operations commencing on 15 December 2019. When next tendered, the contract was awarded to Vy who will takeover in 2027.

== Services ==
Go-Ahead Nordic operates services on the Arendal, Jæren and Sørlandet lines.

== Rolling stock ==
Go-Ahead Nordic operates 20 electric multiple units; two Class 69s, 11 Class 72s and seven Class 73s. It also operates three El 18 electric locomotives and 14 B7 carriages. All are leased from Norske Tog.
