= Arendal Line =

Railway line in Norway

Coordinates: 58°34′21.18″N 8°44′32.53″E

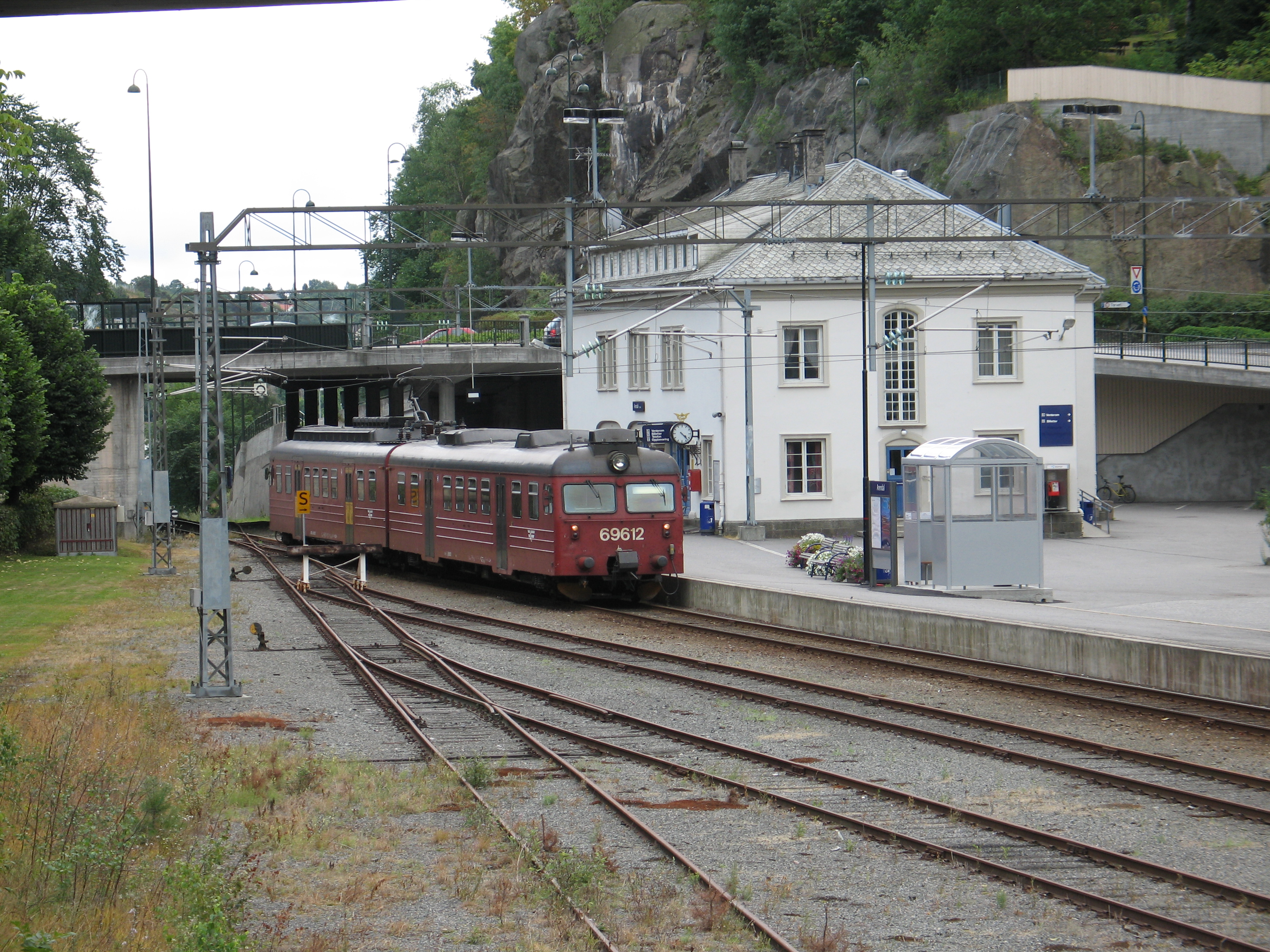
- Class 69 unit at Arendal Station

Overview
- Native name: Arendalsbanen
- Owner: Bane NOR
- Termini: Nelaug; Arendal

Service
- Type: Railway
- Operator: Go-Ahead Norge
- Rolling stock: Class 69

History
- Opened: 23 November 1908 (to Froland); 17 December 1910 (to Åmli); 14 December 1913 (to Treungen)

Technical
- Line length: 37 km (23 mi)
- Number of tracks: Single
- Character: Passenger
- Track gauge: 1,435 mm (4 ft 8 1/2 in) standard gauge
- Old gauge: 1,067 mm (3 ft 6 in)
- Electrification: 15 kV 16.7 Hz AC
- Highest elevation: 141.1 m (463 ft)

The Arendal Line (Norwegian: Arendalsbanen) is a 45-kilometer (28 mi) long railway line between Arendal and Simonstad in Norway. At Nelaug, 37 kilometers (23 mi) north of Arendal, the line intersects with the Sørland Line. The southern section is electrified and provides a feeder passenger service. The line originally ran 90 kilometers (56 mi) north from Arendal to Treungen and the lake Nisser, but the upper-most part has been removed. The line is owned by the Bane NOR and operated by Go-Ahead Norge using Class 69 trains.

Originally named the Arendal–Åmli Line, the first part of the line, from Arendal to Froland, opened on 23 November 1908. The line was extended to Åmli on 17 December 1910 and to Treungen on 14 December 1913, and was named the Arendal–Treungen Line. The line also had a branch, the Grimstad Line built 1907, from Rise to Grimstad. At this time this was the only railway at any of its stations, as the Sørland Line was not built in this region yet. Originally the line was 1,067 mm (3 ft 6 in) narrow gauge; in 1935, the Sørland Line was extended to Nelaug, and the section to Arendal rebuilt to standard gauge to allow the Sørland Line to have a temporary terminus in Arendal. The line became a branch again in 1938 and in 1946 the upper section, received standard gauge. The southern section was gradually named the Arendal Line, while the northern section became the Treungen Line. The latter was closed in 1967, following the closing of a mine which had used it for iron ore and a reduction in lumber transport. The section south of Nelaug was electrified in 1995.

== Route ==
The Arendal–Treungen Line was originally a 90.87-kilometer (56.46 mi) long railway. Since 1971, the line has only run to Simonstad, which is 44.48 kilometers (27.64 mi) from Arendal. At Nelaug, 36.20 kilometers (22.49 mi) from Arendal, the line meets with the Sørland Line. The line is owned by Bane NOR. Although electrified at 15 kV 16.7 Hz AC, it lacks centralized traffic control and Global System for Mobile Communications – Railway.

Of the demolished part of the line, particularly between Simonstad and Sandå, most has been converted to a highway. However, part of the route lies in forests; part of this is again used as forestry roads. Although there remains tracks and a water tower at Simonstad, the station building has been demolished. All station buildings further north on the line have been preserved. The station area at Åmli is a bus station, while the station building itself is a library. Many of the other station buildings are used for housing, although at Tjønnefoss it is a café. At Treungen, the entire station area remains, including the main building, water tower, cargo building, roundhouse and housing for railway employees.

== Service ==
The line operates with a single-fare structure so tickets cost the same no matter where passengers travel. The exception is between Arendal and Stoa, where all passengers travel on children fare. The line has stops at Arendal, Stoa, Bråstad, Blakstad, Froland, Bøylestad, Flaten and Nelaug.

== History ==
=== Planning ===
Planning of the line started in 1874, when Aust-Agder County Municipality (then Nedenes) established a railway committee. It was created based on the national ambitions of creating a Vestland Line (later named the Sørland Line) which would connect Rogaland and Agder to Oslo and Eastern Norway. There was controversy regarding the choice of route; while many proposals existed, the two main was an inland route and a coastal route. Nedenes County Railway Committee supported an inner route, stating the large amount of lumber which was logged in the interior parts of the county, and which depreciated in value during log driving—which could take up to three years.

During the early 1880s, Norway fell into a recession and railway construction halted. By 1884, planning of the Vestland Line had halted, and instead municipalities started planning lines which would connect the coastal towns to inland lakes. The hope was that if an inland line was later built, these would also act as branch lines, giving the towns railway connections to the capital. In Nordenes, it was proposed that both Arendal and Grimstad would have a branch line, which would connect somewhere north of towns, and continue northwards into the interior. In 1891, an agreement was reached between local politicians to build a line from the lake Nisser through Åmli and Moripen to Messel, where the line would branch to Grimstad and Arendal. Originally the proposal had called for the branching to occur even closer to the coast, at Rykene. Representatives from Arendal wanted an even further away branching point, and proposed Bøylestad.

In 1892, the Ministry of Labour proposed several lines in the area. One went from Grimstad via Arendal to Nisser via Nelaug, the other were the Kragerø Line and a line connecting to Risør. It was followed up by a proposal for a line from Kongsberg—then terminus of the Sørland Line—to Grovane, which had a railway to Kristiansand. The proposed line would have branches to Skien, Kragerø, Arendal, Åmli, Risør, Grimtad, Tvedestrand and Notodden. In 1893, the proposal was rejected by the Parliament of Norway, although the section from Arendal to Åmli was approved.

The plans were based on a station on the southern shore Langesævannet in Arendal, with a branch which would continue to the port at Ormviken. Along this route it would also be possible to continue the line to Grimstad. The line passed by parliament would run from Arendal via Harebakken, Blaakestad, Lyngraat Grube and Hersel to Bøylestad to Åmli. The plans, which were not voted over, involved the line continuing northwards to the country border to Telemark (then Bratsberg), where it would branch in two and run to Drangsvannet and Tveitsund. On 1 March 1894, parliament passed The Great Railway Compromise, which in addition to among other things the Bergen Line saw several smaller lines be passed, including from Arendal to Åmli.

The parliamentary decision required that 20 percent of the 4.2 million Norwegian krone (NOK) cost be granted locally. Arendal Municipality guaranteed for half of this, but the other municipalities and the county municipality were not willing to grant sufficient sums. In 1895 and 1896, a new route was surveyed via Messel instead of Hersel, and in 1896 the county council increased their grant from NOK 80,000 to 150,000 on condition that the new route be chosen. The new route was 8.6 kilometers (5.3 mi) long and had a more difficult terrain.

The Norwegian State Railways supported the Hersel line because it would be NOK 388,000 cheaper, while the lumber industry supported the Messel route. At the time, the branch to Grimstad was being planned built as a private railway, and from Messel to Blakstad the Messel route and the Grimstad Line would follow the same right-of-way. The ministry supported the Messel route, and that the section south of Nelaug was to be built with trunk route standard, resulting in higher standards. The route was passed by parliament on 11 June 1898, who also reduced local grants to 15 percent.

The renaming route issue was in Arendal and from the town to Solbergvann, a small lake just outside. Six lines were proposed in 1902: one via Strømsbusletten, one via Kittelsbukt, one via Barbudalen, two via Strømsbubukten, and one through the city center. In Arendal, the original plans was to build the station outside of town at Strømsbusletten. Sam Eyde was hired to make a new plan, and he proposed filling up Kittelsbukt and placing the station in the town center. The issue was voted over in parliament on 8 June 1903, but without any decision. In 1903, Nikolai Prebensen was elected to parliament from Arendal, with his support for the Kittelsbukt alternative a major cause for him winning the election. Five proposals were made by the ministry when they again sent the issue to parliament.

Prebensen and Minister Hans Christian Albert Hansen supported the Kittelsbukt alternative, while NSB and the majority of the Railway Committee supported the Barbu alternative. Parliament first voted against the Kittelsbukt alternative, then against an alternative for Kittelsbukt where the municipality covered half of the extra expenditure, and then finally voted unanimously for the Barbu alternative. At the same time, parliament decided to build the line with 1,067 mm (3 ft 6 in) narrow gauge, although the right-of-way was to be built to allow it to be converted to standard gauge later. The cost saving of building with narrow gauge was minimal, but this would allow the line to take over excess rolling stock from lines being converted from narrow to standard gauge. The upper section was to be built as class III, a light standard with a minimum curve radius of 250 meters (820 ft) and level crossings instead of underpasses for public roads. A proposal to build the line with electric traction was rejected. On 1 July 1907, parliament amended their decision by changing the route slightly at Bøylefoss and Flatenfoss to allow dams to be built.

=== Construction ===
Construction started the section between Solbergvannet and Blakstad on 17 December 1900. By March 1903, 75 percent of the leveling was completed. Work on the lower part started in 1904, and construction of the Barbu Tunnel started in September. The earthworks from the tunnel was used to fill up part of the port. Breakthrough was made on 26 May 1906 and the tunnel was completed in June 1907. Particularly the section from Arendal to Rise and from Froland to Simonstad required much leveling, and along the 21 kilometers (13 mi) from Evenstad to Foløya there was no road. Eleven barracks were built to house workers on the section.

On 1 July 1907, parliamentarian Finn Blakstad criticized the progress in the construction. By then, only 14 kilometers (8.7 mi) of the line had been leveled in addition to a few bridges being started. Given that construction had been going on for seven years, he estimated that at that speed the line would be completed in 1940. The Vestland Line Railway Committee sent a petition to the ministry on 28 November, stating that construction was going too slow, and that the municipalities had paid the necessary dues years ago. On 23 December, Lund stated that the 16-kilometer (9.9 mi) long section between Arendal and Froland would be opened the following year. This was among other things possible after Minister of Labour Nils Ihlen had promised to increase the number of workers from 300 to 600. In 1908, a large number of new navvies came from work at the Rjukan Line, which was at the time experiencing a strike.

Work on the Bøylefossen Bridge started in early 1908 and was completed in late 1909. Several embankments were built; the largest two were at Kilandskilen, made with 20,000 cubic meters (710,000 cu ft) of earthwork, and at Foløysund, which was made with 25,000 cubic meters (880,000 cu ft). The navvies were paid NOK 2.50 for a ten-hour work day. One person, Gustav Albertsen, was killed during construction, while laying ballast at Simonstad.

The Grimstad Line had been built faster, and was opened on 14 September 1907. On 17 October 1908, the first train ran between Arendal and Froland. However, regular services did not start until 23 November. The line had two train per day per direction, using a single train. Travel time was between 52 and 58 minutes, with intermediate stops at Bråstad, Rise and Blakstad. The first official opening of the line took place on 17 December 1910 by Prime Minister Wollert Konows, when the whole section from Arendal to Åmli was taken into use. Regular service from Froland to Åmli started the following day. The section from Arendal to Åmli cost NOK 5.3 million and received Class IV locomotives. During the early years, trains could be as long as having three locomotives and 22 cars. On Sundays, the train was used by people in Arendal to visit the surrounding areas, and these trains could have up to 400 passengers.

From the opening, there were two or three train per direction per day, of which one train only went between Froland and Arendal. Travel time between Arendal and Åmli was between two and a half and three hours. The morning trains from Åmli to Aendal and the afternoon express service the other way carried post. Post offices were established at Bøylestad, Flaten and Simonstad. Two additional stations, at Torbjørnsbu and Rossedalen, were taken into use on 1 May 1911. The same year, parliament decided that the Arendal Line would be its own district and not be administered along with the Setesdal Line from Kristiansand.

The decision to extend the line to Tveitsund (Treungen from 1926) was taken by parliament on 20 July 1908. The details for the section in Bratsberg was taken in 1910, and the remaining part in 1911. Construction started in late 1910 in the north, while the southern part started construction at the end of the year. About 300 people worked on the line, which saw a strike from 1 May 1912 until the end of August. Laying of track started during late 1912. North of Gaukås, the terrain was more hilly. At one place, 4,000 cubic meters (140,000 cu ft) of earth and 6,000 cubic meters (210,000 cu ft) needed to be removed to create a cutting. The line had a minimum curve radius of 250 meters (820 ft) and had gravel ballast. The permanent way was built wide enough for the line to be converted to standard gauge.

The 33.2-kilometer (20.6 mi) long section from Åmli to Tveitsund was officially opened on 14 December 1913. However, the station buildings were not yet ready, and dispatch of passenger and freight was at first done from sheds. The stations were gradually completed by 1914. All trains running to Åmli were extended to Treungen, and the line received some new rolling stock, including two Class XXIIId locomotives. The whole railway from Arendal to Tveitsund cost NOK 9.9 million.

=== Narrow gauge operations ===
At Tveitsund, the railway corresponded with the ferry Nissen and Dølen, which ran on Nisser. The Nissedal Municipal Council stated that the location of the station was problematic, as it was located on the south side of the river, while most access was from the north side. A bridge across the river was therefore built and opened in 1918. In 1916, a mine was opened at Søftestad on Nisser. The ore was transported by barge down the lake and transshipped to the railway. The passenger service with Dølen on Nisser was terminated in 1937.

After the opening of the line to Froland, NSB started operating ore trains from Froland to Arendal. The ore was mined at Gloserhei and hauled to Blakstad Station with horse. The mine halted production from 1914 to 1924, and after 1934 started using trucks, which ran all the way to Arendal. During the First World War, 514 tonnes (506 long tons; 567 short tons) of apatite was mined and transported by rail from Blakstad to Arendal. During the war, the railway increased its transport of wood, used to replace coal. The lack of coal also resulted in many cancellations on the line.

In 1910, construction work started for Bøylefoss Power Station; the railway ran right past and was used for transport of both materials and people. During construction, a halt was built there. The power station was completed in 1913. Construction of Høgefoss Power Station, also located along the line, started in 1919 and was completed the following year. Later construction included Flatenfoss Power Station between 1925 and 1928, and Evenstad Power Station between 1937 and 1940.

From about 1915, milk transport started along the lower part of the line. Milk weights were installed at Lindtviet, Løddesøl and Rise. From 1 July 1913 though 31 June 1914, the Treungen and Grimstad Lines had 157,986 passengers, of which 2,461 traveled on the 50% more expensive second class. By 1918–19, the ridership had increased by 10,000, while the number of second class riders was halved. From 1924, all second-class carriages were removed on both lines.

The line received two Cmb 13 diesel multiple units in 1927, and a third in 1930. This resulted in additional halts being created, and for a short while the multiple units would even stop at road crossings. In 1928, NSB unmanned the stations Bråstad, Haugsjø, Vallekilen, Seljås, Sandå and Gaukås. On the express trains that ran from Treungen to Arendal in the morning and the other direction in the evening, there was a post clerk. In addition to dispatching post, he sold newspapers, magazines, lottery tickets and could be hired to perform various smaller tasks while he was in Arendal.

=== Standard gauge ===
In 1927, the Sørland Line was extended to Neslandsvatn and received a temporary terminus at Kragerø via the Kragerø Line. The next stage of the line was the extension from Neslandsvatn to Nelaug, where it would connect to the Arendal Line and use it to reach the coast. In preparation for the arrival, NSB had in 1923 proposed to convert the Treungen and Grimstad Lines to standard gauge. This was denied, but again proposed in 1928. The cost was estimated at NOK 2.7 million. NSB also stated that an alternative was to close the line north of Nelaug and the Grimstad Line. In 1931, a new proposal was made, and finally a decision was made to rebuild the line from Arendal to Nelaug with dual gauge. By 1934, the proposal was changed so that the Grimstad Line was to be closed, the section from Arendal to Nelaug has standard gauge, and the northern part have narrow gauge. After local protests, it was decided by parliament to keep the Grimstad Line.

Since 1925, all maintenance on the line had been done with a standard gauge conversion in mind. Among other things, 30,000 narrow gauge ties had been replaced. Work on replacing the remaining ties started on 1 July 1932. Two years later, a third rail started being laid. On both sides of the bridge at Froland, the profile was too narrow, resulting in a curve radius of 220 meters (720 ft). Nelaug Station was built, and because the upper part of the line would retain narrow gauge, the new station received transshipment facilities. The last narrow-gauge train to Arendal ran on 19 October 1935. The following evening, standard-gauge operations were introduced. The first train from Arendal to Oslo ran on 2 November, and the new line officially opened on 9 November. The Grimstad Line retained narrow gauge until 9 November 1936.

While terminus for the Sørland Line, Arendal experienced a larger increase in traffic, as all transport to the South Coast went through the town. On 21 June 1938, the Sørland Line between Nelaug and Grovane opened, and the Arendal Line became a branch. Arendal District was closed, and the Arendal Line became part of Kristiansand District. Passengers from Arendal had to transfer to the express trains at Nelaug, and the second class carriage was terminated. However, the number of services along the line increased slightly, in part to allow fish to be transported with the express train to Oslo.

The section from Nelaug to Treungen had a break-of-gauge, causing increased operating costs and inconvenience. From 1935, the line received two daily trains per direction per day. This was increased to three the following year. In 1938, Class 9 locomotives were introduced on so-called "small trains", where the fireman also acted as conductor. After the Grimstad Line was converted to standard gauge, the class was also used on freight trains between Arendal and Grimstad. It would then back from Arendal to Rise, run forward to Grimstad, back from Grimtad to Rise and then run forward to Arendal.

In 1939, the mine at Søftestad reopened, with an annual production of 100,000 tonnes (98,000 long tons; 110,000 short tons) of iron ore. This was transported by truck to Treungen, where it was loaded onto trains. During the Second World War, non-local travel was not permitted without a permit. One of the large attractions was weekend trips to pick berries; at the most 1,000 people took the train from Arendal with this in mind.

The cost to change to standard gauge was estimated to NOK 1.3 million; this was deemed too expensive by the ministry in 1938. NSB bought 20 boxes for lumber and 16 boxcars with modules which could be easily transshipped between two cars. The decision to convert the gauge was made in 1942 and some of the necessary funds were granted. The change of gauge started on 8 July 1946, which also including increasing the axle load to 10 tonnes (9.8 long tons; 11 short tons). Trains ran to Simonstad, then Åmli and Treungen, as the conversion was gradually completed. The first through train ran on 20 July.

From 1950, NSB introduced an express train twice per day between Oslo and Kristiansand, using Class 66 units. A corresponding service was put up between Arendal and Nelaug; it ran without intermediate stops and used 38 minutes. In 1951, the line received two, and later three, Class 87 multiple units. The milk routes were terminated in 1952. In 1953, a new road from Fyresdal to Tjønnefoss opened, giving increased traffic from the station. In 1955, the last of the Cmb 13 trains were retired and a new Class 86 train was stationed in Arendal. It ran on the lower part of the line. If it was at service, a steam locomotives—normally Class 21—and carriages were used, which would cause delays.

On 17 June 1957, the tunnel between the town square and the station in Arendal opened. From 1950 to 1957, NSB replaced the tracks south of Nelaug with heavier 38 kilograms per meter (25 lb/ft) tracks. Heavier Class 18c locomotives were introduced, but these could only be used south of Nelaug. In 1960, the upper part of the line received a Class 86, and in 1965, a common reserve Class 86 was stationed in Drammen for Stavanger, Kristiansand and Drammen Districts. The Grimstad Line was closed from 1 September 1961. As part of NSB's campaign to retire steam locomotives, a Di 2 diesel locomotive was test-run on 16 February 1961. It ran on the Arendal–Nelaug section for a month in 1962, was proved too stiff. Trials in 1964 showed that the issues had been resolved, and the line too the class into use from 1965. The last steam locomotive was used in 1968.

=== Closing of the Treungen Line ===
During the 1950s, iron ore and lumber were the main use for the upper section of the line. By 1960, there were two or three weekly pure ore trains in addition to hopper cars in ordinary freight trains. A new lumber crane was installed at Treungen in 1962, with Hunsfoss Fabrikker stating they would be sending an additional 18 tonnes (18 long tons; 20 short tons) of lumber. In 1964, a five-year contract was signed with the mine for 44,000 tonnes (43,000 long tons; 49,000 short tons) of ore per year, but the following year the mine closed. The same year, only 1,000 tonnes (980 long tons; 1,100 short tons) of lumber were being sent by the line. There was a 23 percent drop in passenger traffic between 1962 and 1965, to 45,300 people, and the line lost NOK 700,000 that year. During the last years, the upper part of the line had three daily services with Class 87 trains and three weekly freight trains hauled by Di 2.

NSB proposed that the line be closed in 1966, and in April 1967, the Standing Committee on Transport and Communications had an inspection of the area, particularly looking at roads. The decision to close the line from 1 October 1967 was made by parliament on 22 June, and included NOK 12 million for new roads. There was a proposal to use part of the line to build an airport for Treungen. The line remained in sporadic use for some years, both for access to Fjone Power Station, and for the railway to have access to a gravel pit at Bjorevja. Passenger traffic was replaced by buses. Parliamentarian Osmund Faremo attempted to reopen the line in April 1968, but this was rejected by Minister Håkon Kyllingmark. Work to demolish the line in May, starting at Treungen.

On 26 October 1971, a sawmill at Nidarå opened. The section from Nelaug to Simonstad was reopened, and a 1-kilometer (0.62 mi) long branch line was built from Simonstad. Di 2 was set to haul the freight trains. Similar industry was planned at Suplandsfoss, 4 kilometers (2.5 mi) further north; plans to reopen the line to there were launched, but in 1970, NSB agreed that the Norwegian Public Roads Administration could use the remaining part of the line for National Road 415.

In 1984, the Di 2 locomotives were replaced with Skd 224, which can haul a train weight of 250 tonnes (250 long tons; 280 short tons), albeit at very low speeds. In 1988, the number of passenger trains on the Arendal Line was reduced from six to five, with trains corresponding with all trains on the Sørland Line to and from Oslo. After upgrades to the track, the maximum speed on the line was increased from 60 to 90 kilometers per hour (37 to 56 mph). In 1989, NSB decided to close a large number of branch line, but the Arendal Line was one of very few who were not closed. The same year, the stops Blakstad, Blakstad bru and Hurv were merged to a new stop.

=== Electrification ===
On 6 August 1993, the government approved the plans to electrify the Arendal Line south of Nelaug. NOK 20 million of the necessary 45 million was granted for the 1994 budget, with NOK 12 million being advanced from municipalities and the county. As a temporary remedy to replace the aging trains, Class 92 multiple units were put into service from 1994. The line took electric traction into use on 15 June 1995. NSB introduced Class 68 trains on the line, which were at the time the oldest electric multiple units used by the company. Six months later, NSB stated that unless they received addition grants, many smaller services, including the Arendal Line, would have to be terminated. From July 1997, NSB terminated the night train from Arendal because of lack of rolling stock.

In 2000, the railway company Timetoget had negotiated an agreement with NSB to take over passenger operations on the Bratsberg Line. The company started negotiating also taking over operations on the Arendal Line. They proposed using Y1 diesel railcars with a capacity for 70 people. With the introduction of the Class 73, NSB also proposed establishing a direct morning express from Arendal to Oslo without transfer at Nelaug. However, neither proposal was realized. From 20 October, the service was terminated on the Arendal Line and the Bratsberg Line. NSB had a large shortage of motormen, and chose to close operations on the lines with least traffic to allocate sufficient personnel to areas with higher ridership. Traffic resumed on 24 June 2001. From 1999 to 2003, the line halved it traffic, to 50,000 passengers per year. In the mid-2000s, Class 69 multiple units were put into service on the line. By 2007, ridership was again rising, with a 16 percent increase that year. In 2008, a new station at Stoa was opened, costing NOK 1.5 million.

On 15 December 2019 operation of the line passed from Vy to Go-Ahead Norge.

== See also ==
- List of gauge conversions
