= Aust-Agder =

County of Norway (1919–2019)

Aust-Agder County Aust-Agder fylke
- Former County
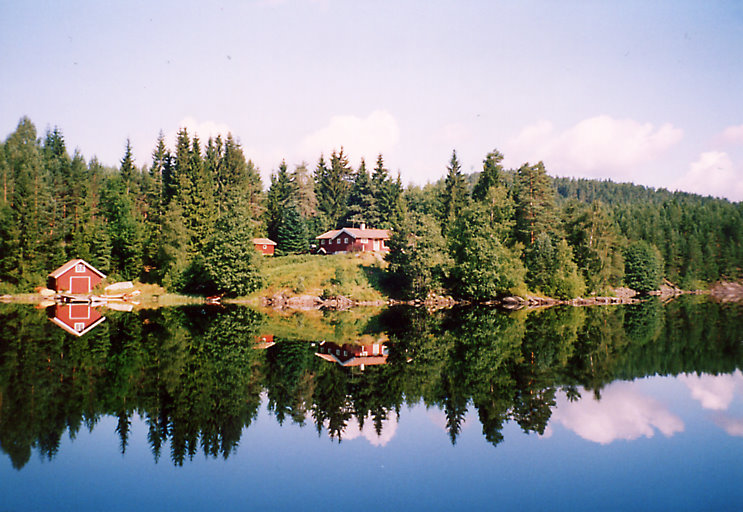
- The lake Vegår in 2001

- Flag Coat of arms

- Aust-Agder within Norway
- Coordinates: 58°34′00″N 08°34′00″E
- Country: Norway
- County: Aust-Agder
- District: Southern Norway
- Established: 1685
  - Preceded by: Agdesiden
- Disestablished: 1 Jan 2020
  - Succeeded by: Agder county
- Administrative centre: Arendal

Government
  - Body: Aust-Agder County Municipality
  - Governor (2016-2019): Svein Ytterdahl (Ap)
  - County mayor (2017-2019): Gro Bråten (Ap)

Area (upon dissolution)
  - Total: 9,158 km^{2} (3,536 sq mi)
  - Land: 8,353 km^{2} (3,225 sq mi)
  - Water: 805 km^{2} (311 sq mi)

Population (30 September 2019)
  - Total: 118,127
  - Density: 14.14/km^{2} (36.63/sq mi)
  - Change (10 years): ▲ +4.3%
- Demonym: Austegde

Official language
  - Norwegian form: Neutral
- Time zone: UTC+01:00 (CET)
  - Summer (DST): UTC+02:00 (CEST)
- ISO 3166 code: NO-09
- Income (per capita): 135,700 kr (2001)
- GDP (per capita): 208,275 kr (2001)
- GDP national rank: #18 in Norway (1.4% of country)

Aust-Agder (Norwegian: [ˈæ̂ʉstˌɑɡdər], lit. '"East Agder"') was a county (fylke) in Norway from 1 January 1919 to 31 December 2019, after it was merged with Vest-Agder county to form the new Agder county. In 2002, there were 102,945 inhabitants, which was 2.2% of Norway's population. Its area was 9,212 square kilometres (3,557 sq mi). The county's administrative center was the town of Arendal.

The county, located along the Skagerrak coast, extended from Gjernestangen in Risør Municipality to the Kvåsefjorden in Lillesand Municipality. The inner parts of the area included Setesdalsheiene and Austheiene mountain areas. Most of the population lived near the coast; about 78% of the county's inhabitants lived in the five coastal municipalities of Arendal, Grimstad, Lillesand, Tvedestrand, and Risør. The rest of the county was sparsely populated. Tourism was also important, as Arendal and the other coastal towns were popular attractions.

The county included the larger islands of Tromøya, Hisøya, Justøya, and Sandøya. The interior of the county encompassed the traditional district of Setesdal, through which the river Otra flows to the coast.

In 2017, the Parliament of Norway voted to merge Aust-Agder and Vest-Agder counties into one large county called Agder, effective 1 January 2020.

The county was part of the Aust-Agder District Court and the Church of Norway Diocese of Agder og Telemark.

== Name ==
The meaning of the name is "(the) eastern (part of) Agder", since the word aust is the Nynorsk form of "east".

Until 1919, the name of the county was Nedenes amt. The amt was named after the old Nedenes farm (Old Norse: Niðarnes), since this was the seat of the amtmann (County Governor). The first element is the genitive case of the river name Nið (now called Nidelva) and the last element is nes which means "headland". The meaning of the river name is unknown.

== Coat of arms ==
The coat of arms was from modern times. They were granted on 12 December 1958. It showed two horizontal golden bars on a red background. They symbolized the lumber trade and the recovery of iron ore that was important for Aust-Agder's growth. There were two bars to represent the two areas of the county: inland and coastal.

== Demographics ==
Historical population
Year	1951	1961	1971	1981	1991	2001	2011
Pop.	75,811	77,066	80,839	90,629	97,314	102,714	110,048
±%	—	+1.7%	+4.9%	+12.1%	+7.4%	+5.5%	+7.1%
Source: Statistics Norway.

Religion in Aust-Agder
religion	percent
Christianity	87.57%
Islam	0.75%
Buddhism	0.24%
Other	11.44%

Since the census of 1769, Aust-Agder has experienced a steady population growth: from 29,633 to 79,927 in 1900, and to 102,848 in 2001. There was significant emigration to the United States in the 19th century and early 20th century.

== Municipalities ==
The system of municipalities, or kommuner, was established in Norway on 1 January 1838, based on previously existing parishes (see formannskapsdistrikt law). Norway had been ceded to Sweden by Denmark in 1814, at which it promptly rebelled and won the right of self-rule, though nominally part of Sweden. In 1905, Norway declared total independence. Meanwhile, as the years progressed, the municipalities did not remain the same, but new ones were formed, old ones broken up, and land was transferred. From the 1990s until its dissolution in 2020, Aust-Agder was divided into 15 municipalities:

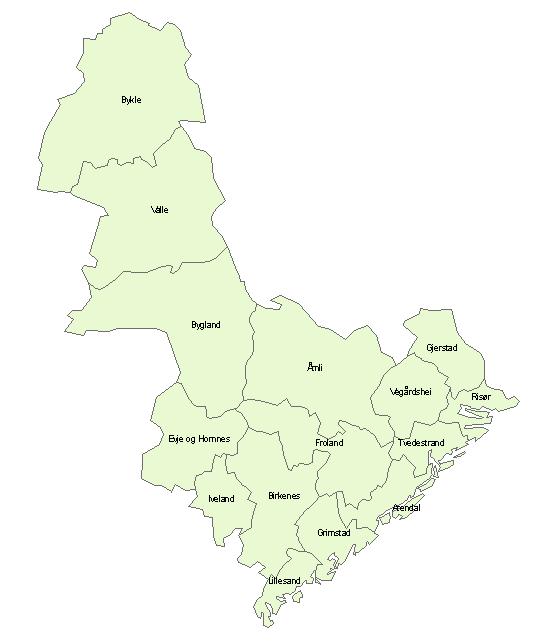
Map of the municipalities in the county

No.	Name	Adm. Center	Population	Area (km^{2})
0901	Risør Municipality	Risør	6,936	193
0904	Grimstad Municipality	Grimstad	22,692	304
0906	Arendal Municipality	Arendal	44,576	270
0911	Gjerstad Municipality	Gjerstad	2,511	322
0912	Vegårshei Municipality	Myra	2,104	356
0914	Tvedestrand Municipality	Tvedestrand	6,051	215
0919	Froland Municipality	Blakstad	5,713	645
0926	Lillesand Municipality	Lillesand	10,702	190
0928	Birkenes Municipality	Birkeland	5,178	674
0929	Åmli Municipality	Åmli	1,856	1,131
0935	Iveland Municipality	Birketveit	1,342	262
0937	Evje og Hornnes Municipality	Evje	3,614	550
0938	Bygland Municipality	Bygland	1,200	1,312
0940	Valle Municipality	Valle	1,246	1,265
0941	Bykle Municipality	Bykle	952	1,467
Total	Aust-Agder	Arendal	116,673	9,158

== Cities ==
- Arendal
- Grimstad
- Risør
- Lillesand
- Tvedestrand

== Parishes ==
- Arendal
- Austad
- Austre Moland
- Barbu
- Birkenes
- Bjorbekk
- Bygland
- Bykle
- Old Bykle
- Dypvåg
- Eide
- Engene
- Evje
- Færvik
- Fevik
- Fjære
- Fjellgardane
- Flosta
- Froland
- Frydendal
- Gjerstad
- Gjøvdal
- Grimstad
- Grøvdal, see Gjøvdal
- Herefoss
- Hisøy
- Holt
- Hommedal
- Hornnes
- Hylestad
- Høvåg
- Iveland
- Justøy
- Laget
- Landvik
- Lillesand
- Mykland
- Risør
- Sandnes
- Stokken
- Søndeled (Sønneløv)
- Tovdal
- Trefoldighet (Trinity)
- Tromøy
- Tvedestrand
- Valle
- Vegusdal
- Vegårshei
- Vestre Moland
- Østerhus
- Østre Moland, see Austre Moland
- Øyestad
- Åmli
- Årdal
- Arendal Branch (LDS, 1864-1914)
- Arendal Lutherske Frimenighet (1884-1908)
- Arendal (Den Katolske Apostoliske, 1889-1928)
- Arendal Metodistkirke (1868-1892)
- Risør Branch (LDS, 1851-1866)
- Risør Lutheran Frikirke, (1877-1995)
- Tvedestrand Baptist Menighet (1892-1895)

== Villages ==
- Akland
- Asdal
- Askerøya
- Askland
- Ausland
- Austad
- Bakken
- Berdalen
- Besteland
- Birkeland
- Birketveit
- Bjorbekk
- Bjåen
- Blakstad
- Borås
- Bossvika
- Bossvika
- Breive
- Brekka
- Brekkestø
- Brokke
- Bygland
- Byglandsfjord
- Bykle
- Bøylefoss
- Bøylestad
- Dypvåg
- Dølemo
- Dåsnesmoen
- Eikeland
- Engesland
- Eppeland
- Espenes
- Evje
- Evjemoen
- Eydehavn
- Fevik
- Fiane, Gjerstad
- Fiane, Tvedestrand
- Fie
- Flakk
- Flatebygd
- Flaten
- Froland
- Frolands verk
- Færvik
- Gautestad
- Gjennestad
- Gjerstad
- Gjeving
- Goderstad
- Grendi
- Gryting
- Grønland
- Heldalsmo
- Helldal
- Herefoss
- Hesnes
- Hillestad (Tovdal)
- Hinebu
- His (Hisøy)
- Holmsund
- Homborsund
- Homdrom
- Homme
- Hornnes
- Hoslemo
- Hovden
- Hovet
- Hynnekleiv
- Hødnebø
- Høvåg
- Håbbesland
- Håbbestad
- Jomås
- Jortveit
- Kalvøysund
- Kilen
- Kilsund
- Kjetså
- Klåholmen
- Kolbjørnsvik
- Kongshamn
- Krabbesund
- Kroken
- Kråkvåg
- Laget
- Langeid
- Lauvdal
- Lauveik
- Lauvrak
- Libru
- Lindtveit
- Litveit
- Longerak
- Longum
- Lyngør
- Løddesøl
- Løvjomås
- Merdø
- Mjølhus
- Mjåvatn
- Mo
- Moen
- Moi
- Mollestad
- Mykland
- Myra
- Narestø
- Nedenes
- Nelaug
- Nesgrenda
- Nipe
- Nordbygdi
- Nygrenda
- Nævesdal
- Oggevatn
- Ose
- Osedalen
- Pusnes
- Reddal
- Revesand
- Ribe
- Risdal
- Rise
- Roresand
- Rugsland
- Rygnestad
- Rykene
- Rysstad
- Rød, Arendal
- Rød, Gjerstad
- Rønnes
- Røysland
- Sagene
- Sagesund
- Saltrød
- Sandnes, Bygland
- Sandnes, Risør
- Sandvika (Borøy)
- Sennumstad
- Sivik
- Skaiå
- Skåmedal
- Skiftenes
- Skjeggedal
- Songe
- Staubø
- Stoa
- Strengereid
- Sundebru
- Svaland
- Søndeled
- Søre Herefoss
- Tjore
- Trøe
- Tveide
- Tveit
- Ubergsmoen
- Ulvøysund
- Uppstad
- Valle
- Vatnebu
- Vatnestrøm
- Vehus
- Vesterhus
- Vestøl
- Vik
- Vrengen
- Væting
- Ytre Ramse
- Østerholt
- Østerhus
- Østerå
- Øvre Dåsvatn
- Øvre Ramse
- Øyna
- Åkerøyhamn
- Åmdalsøyra
- Åmli
- Åneland
- Åraksbø
- Ås

== Former Municipalities ==
- Austre Moland Municipality
- Barbu Municipality
- Dypvåg Municipality
- Eide Municipality
- Evje Municipality
- Evje og Vegusdal Municipality
- Fjære Municipality
- Flosta Municipality
- Gjøvdal Municipality
- Herefoss Municipality
- Hisøy Municipality
- Holt Municipality
- Hornnes Municipality
- Hornnes og Iveland Municipality
- Hylestad Municipality
- Høvåg Municipality
- Landvik Municipality
- Moland Municipality
- Mykland Municipality
- Stokken Municipality
- Søndeled Municipality
- Tovdal Municipality
- Tromøy Municipality
- Vegusdal Municipality
- Vestre Moland Municipality
- Øyestad Municipality

== See also ==
- Vest-Agder
- Sørlandet
- Agder
