= Dypvåg =

Dypvåg may refer to:

== Places ==
- Dypvåg (village), a village in Tvedestrand Municipality in Agder county, Norway
- Dypvåg Municipality, a former municipality in the old Aust-Agder county, Norway
- Dypvåg Church, a church in Tvedestrand Municipality in Agder county, Norway
