= Østerå =

Village in Tvedestrand Municipality, Norway

- Village
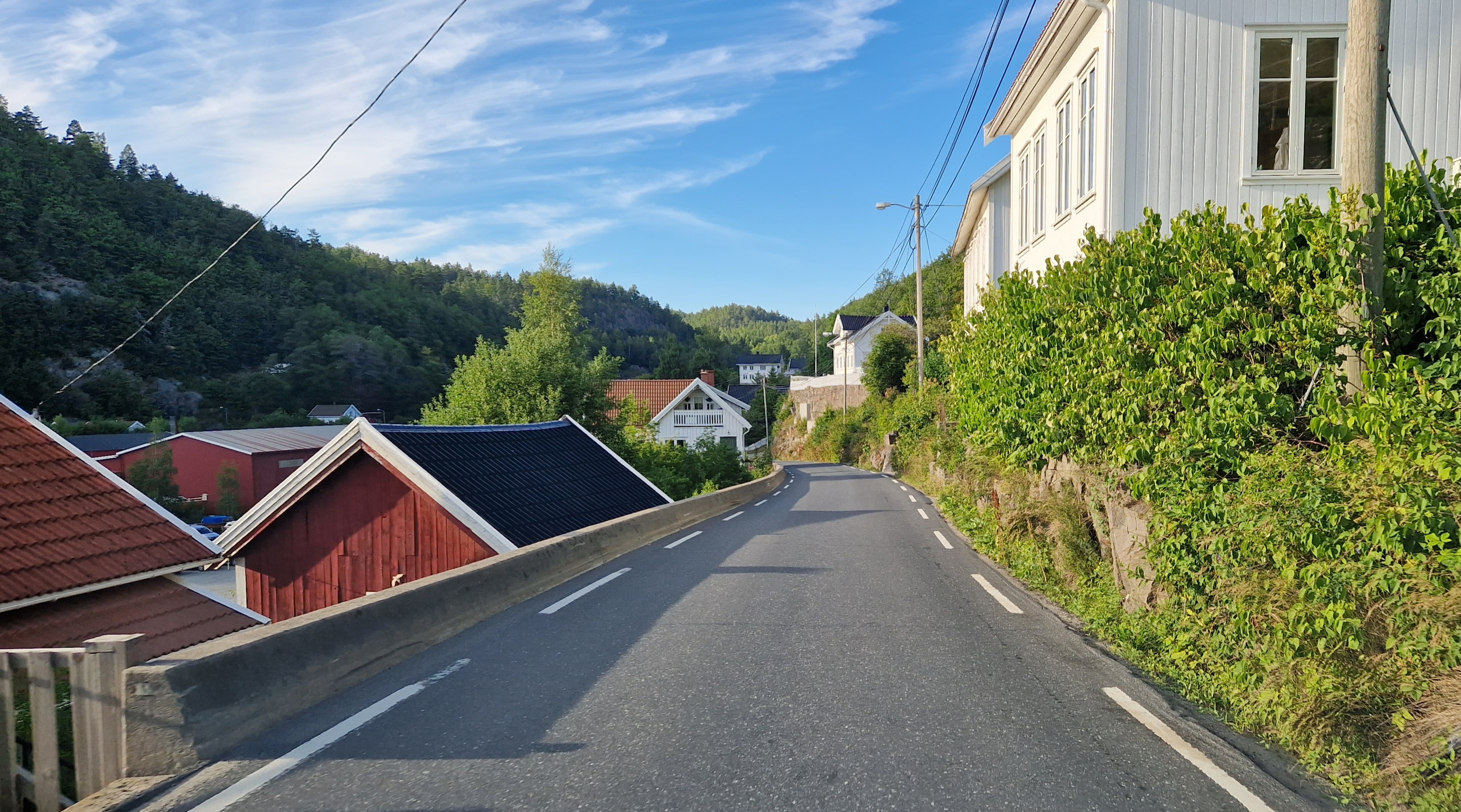
- View of the village
- Interactive map of Østerå
- Coordinates: 58.6281°N 08.9593°E
- Country: Norway
- Region: Southern Norway
- County: Agder
- District: Østre Agder
- Municipality: Tvedestrand Municipality
- Elevation: 26 m (85 ft)
- Time zone: UTC+01:00 (CET)
  - Summer (DST): UTC+02:00 (CEST)
- Post Code: 4900 Tvedestrand

Østerå is a village in Tvedestrand Municipality in Agder county, Norway. The village is located along the Norwegian County Road 411 on the shores of the Tvedestrandfjorden, just east of the town of Tvedestrand and about 3 kilometres (1.9 mi) north of the villages of Grønland and Sagesund.
