= Goderstad =

Village in Tvedestrand Municipality, Norway

- Village
- Interactive map of Goderstad
- Coordinates: 58.6003°N 08.8761°E
- Country: Norway
- Region: Southern Norway
- County: Agder
- District: Østre Agder
- Municipality: Tvedestrand Municipality
- Elevation: 62 m (203 ft)
- Time zone: UTC+01:00 (CET)
  - Summer (DST): UTC+02:00 (CEST)
- Post Code: 4900 Tvedestrand

Goderstad is a village in Tvedestrand Municipality in Agder county, Norway. The village is located along the European route E18 highway, about 2 kilometres (1.2 mi) south of the village of Fiane and the Holt Church.
