= Holt Municipality =

Former municipality in Aust-Agder, Norway

Holt Municipality Holt herred
- Former municipality
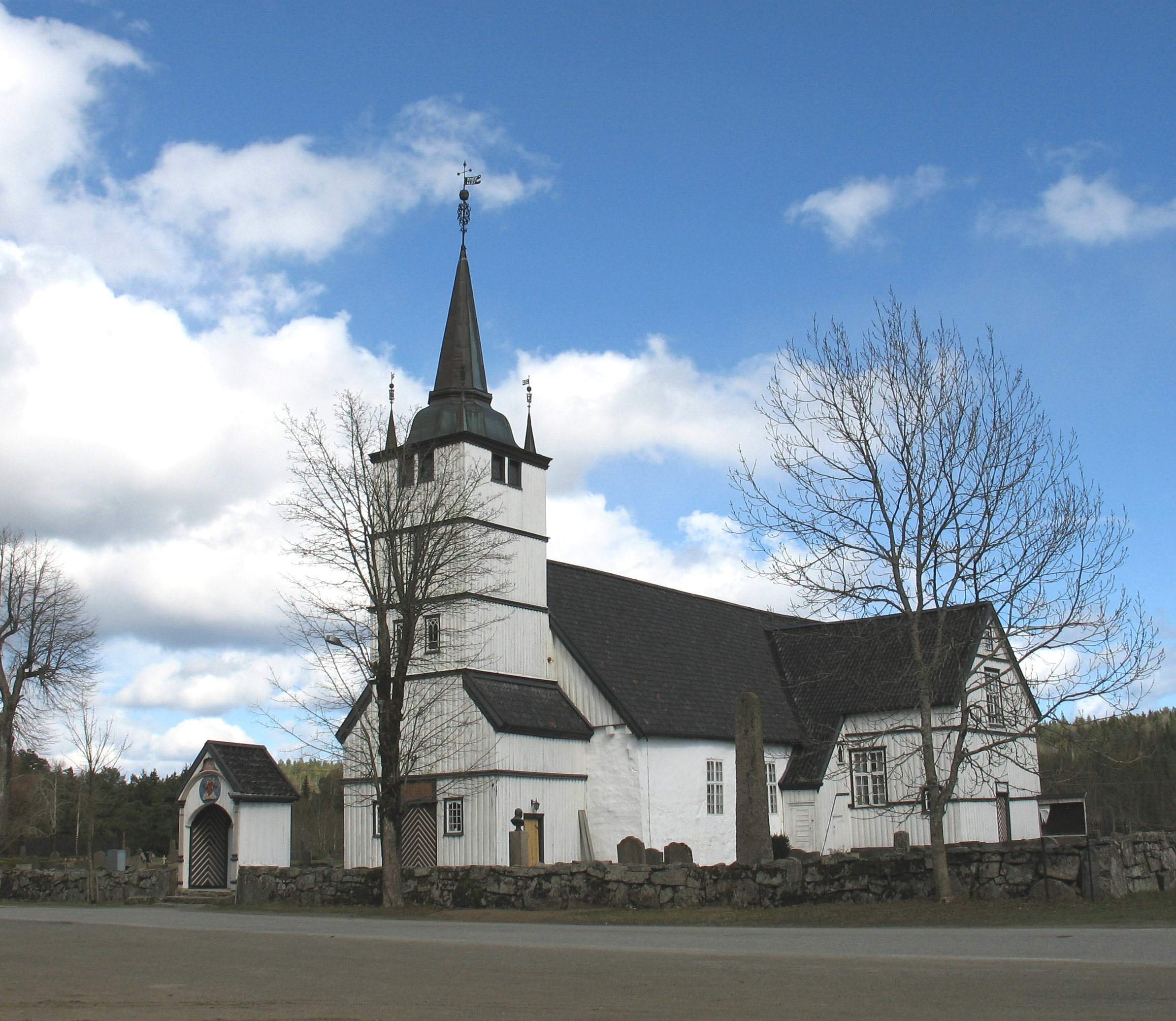
- View of Holt Church

- Aust-Agder within Norway

- Holt within Aust-Agder
- Coordinates: 58°36′24″N 08°52′16″E
- Country: Norway
- County: Aust-Agder
- District: Østre Agder
- Established: 1 Jan 1838
  - Created as: Formannskapsdistrikt
- Disestablished: 1 Jan 1960
  - Succeeded by: Tvedestrand Municipality
- Administrative centre: Fiane

Government
  - Mayor (1952–1959): Frithjof Bjørnstad (Bp)

Area (upon dissolution)
  - Total: 176.4 km^{2} (68.1 sq mi)
  - Rank: #415 in Norway
- Highest elevation: 261.37 m (857.5 ft)

Population (1959)
  - Total: 3,750
  - Rank: #230 in Norway
  - Density: 21.3/km^{2} (55/sq mi)
  - Change (10 years): ▲ +6%
- Demonym: Holting

Official language
  - Norwegian form: Neutral
- Time zone: UTC+01:00 (CET)
  - Summer (DST): UTC+02:00 (CEST)
- ISO 3166 code: NO-0914

Holt is a former municipality in the old Aust-Agder county, Norway. The 176.5-square-kilometre (68.1 sq mi) municipality existed from 1838 until its dissolution in 1960. The area is now part of Tvedestrand Municipality in the traditional district of Østre Agder in Agder county. The administrative centre was the village of Fiane where Holt Church is located.

Prior to its dissolution in 1960, the 176.4-square-kilometre (68.1 sq mi) municipality was the 415th largest by area out of the 743 municipalities in Norway. Holt Municipality was the 230th most populous municipality in Norway with a population of about 3,750. The municipality's population density was 21.3 inhabitants per square kilometre (55/sq mi) and its population had increased by 6% over the previous 10-year period.

The historic Holt Church probably dates from the twelfth century and has an ancient baptismal font. The interior was decorated by Torsten Hoff. The Nordkalottruta trail runs through the Holt area in Tvedestrand.

== General information ==
=== Administrative history ===
The parish of Holt was established as a municipality on 1 January 1838 (see formannskapsdistrikt law). According to the 1835 census, the municipality had a population of 3,116. On 1 January 1881, a small part of Holt Municipality (population: 52) was transferred to Dybvaag Municipality. Then on 1 July 1919, a small part of Holt Municipality (population: 14) was transferred to Moland Municipality.

During the 1960s, there were many municipal mergers across Norway due to the work of the Schei Committee. On 1 January 1960, Dypvåg Municipality was dissolved and the following areas were merged to form an enlarged Tvedestrand Municipality:

- all of Holt Municipality (population: 3,759)
- all of Dypvåg Municipality (population: 1,805)
- all of Tvedestrand Municipality (population: 868)

=== Name ===
The municipality (originally the parish) is named after the old Holt farm (Old Norse: Holt) since the first Holt Church was built there. The name is identical to the word holt which means "small forested area" or "grove (of trees)".

=== Churches ===
The Church of Norway had one parish (sokn) within Holt Municipality. At the time of the municipal dissolution, it was part of the Holt prestegjeld and the Aust-Nedenes prosti (deanery) in the Diocese of Agder.

Churches in Holt Municipality
Parish (sokn)	Church name	Location of the church	Year built
Holt	Holt Church	Fiane	c. 1100
Holt	Laget Chapel	Laget	1908

== Geography ==
The highest point in the municipality was the 261.37-metre (857.5 ft) tall mountain Ansmyrheia. Vegårshei Municipality was located to the north, Søndeled Municipality was located to the northeast, Dypvåg Municipality and Tvedestrand Municipality were located to the east, Flosta Municipality was located to the southeast, Stokken Municipality was located to the south, Austre Moland Municipality was located to the southwest, Froland Municipality was located to the west, and Åmli Municipality was located to the northwest.

== Government ==
While it existed, Holt Municipality was responsible for primary education (through 10th grade), outpatient health services, senior citizen services, welfare and other social services, zoning, economic development, and municipal roads and utilities. The municipality was governed by a municipal council of directly elected representatives. The mayor was indirectly elected by a vote of the municipal council. The municipality was under the jurisdiction of the Holt District Court and the Agder Court of Appeal.

=== Municipal council ===
The municipal council (Herredsstyre) of Holt Municipality was made up of 21 representatives that were elected to four year terms. The tables below show the historical composition of the council by political party.

Holt herredsstyre 1955–1959
Party name (in Norwegian)	Number of representatives
Labour Party (Arbeiderpartiet)	8
Conservative Party (Høyre)	2
Christian Democratic Party (Kristelig Folkeparti)	3
Farmers' Party (Bondepartiet)	3
Liberal Party (Venstre)	4
List of workers, fishermen, and small farmholders (Arbeidere, fiskere, småbrukere liste)	1
Total number of members:	21
Note: On 1 January 1960, Holt Municipality became part of Tvedestrand Municipality.

Holt herredsstyre 1951–1955
Party name (in Norwegian)	Number of representatives
Labour Party (Arbeiderpartiet)	8
Conservative Party (Høyre)	2
Christian Democratic Party (Kristelig Folkeparti)	2
Farmers' Party (Bondepartiet)	3
Liberal Party (Venstre)	5
Total number of members:	20

Holt herredsstyre 1947–1951
Party name (in Norwegian)	Number of representatives
Labour Party (Arbeiderpartiet)	8
Conservative Party (Høyre)	2
Christian Democratic Party (Kristelig Folkeparti)	3
Farmers' Party (Bondepartiet)	3
Joint list of the Liberal Party (Venstre) and the Radical People's Party (Radikale Folkepartiet)	4
Total number of members:	20

Holt herredsstyre 1945–1947
Party name (in Norwegian)	Number of representatives
Labour Party (Arbeiderpartiet)	9
Conservative Party (Høyre)	1
Christian Democratic Party (Kristelig Folkeparti)	5
Farmers' Party (Bondepartiet)	2
Joint list of the Liberal Party (Venstre) and the Radical People's Party (Radikale Folkepartiet)	3
Total number of members:	20

Holt herredsstyre 1937–1941*
Party name (in Norwegian)	Number of representatives
Labour Party (Arbeiderpartiet)	6
Conservative Party (Høyre)	3
Farmers' Party (Bondepartiet)	4
Liberal Party (Venstre)	5
List of workers, fishermen, and small farmholders (Arbeidere, fiskere, småbrukere liste)	2
Total number of members:	20
Note: Due to the German occupation of Norway during World War II, no elections were held for new municipal councils until after the war ended in 1945.

=== Mayors ===
The mayor (Norwegian: ordfører) of Holt Municipality was the political leader of the municipality and the chairperson of the municipal council. The following people have held this position:

- 1838–1842: Jacob Aall
- 1842–1843: Rev. Andreas Faye
- 1844–1847: Lars Jonsen Østeraa
- 1848–1849: Halvor T. Skjerkholt
- 1850–1853: Reier T. Lilleholt
- 1854–1857: Halvor T. Skjerkholt
- 1858–1861: Reier T. Lilleholt
- 1861–1865: Halvor T. Skjerkholt
- 1866–1866: Tor Reiersen Lilleholt
- 1866–1867: Peder Christensen Goderstad
- 1868–1869: Ole Torjesen Goderstad
- 1870–1871: Torbjørn T. Bjelland
- 1872–1875: Halvor H. Lunde
- 1876–1879: Torbjørn T. Bjelland
- 1880–1883: Lars Albretsen Myklebustad
- 1883–1887: Torjus Albretsen Myklebustad
- 1887–1891: Ole E. Grændsen
- 1891–1892: Lars Albretsen Myklebustad
- 1893–1901: Ole E. Grændsen
- 1902–1904: Torjus H. Skjerkholt
- 1905–1907: Ole E. Grændsen
- 1908–1910: Torjus H. Skjerkholt
- 1911–1913: Peder Tengelsen Langang
- 1914–1916: Torjus H. Skjerkholt
- 1917–1925: Stian Erichsen
- 1926–1937: Grunde O. Gliddi
- 1938–1938: Halvor T. Skjerkholt
- 1938–1943: Thoralf Skjerkholt
- 1943–1946: Erling Solberg (NS)
- 1946–1947: Søren Sørensen (Ap)
- 1948–1951: Erik Solberg (KrF)
- 1952–1959: Frithjof Bjørnstad (Bp)

== Attractions ==
=== Holt Church ===
Holt Church (Holt Kirke) is a cruciform church dating from the 1100s. The medieval-era church was constructed of stone. In 1753, it was expanded. The extension, choir and transepts were built of wood. The rebuilt church was also equipped with a chancel arch, decorated in the rococo style. The church has a baptismal font made out of soapstone, carved in high Gothic style. The Baroque altarpiece from 1732 is carved with a painting of Jesus in Gethsemane.

== Notable people ==
- Aasulv Olsen Bryggesaa, a local politician
- Helga Gitmark, a local politician
- Harald Selås, a local politician
- Torje Olsen Solberg, a local politician

== See also ==
- List of former municipalities of Norway
