= Tvedestrand Municipality =

Municipality in Agder, Norway

Tvedestrand Municipality Tvedestrand kommune
- Municipality
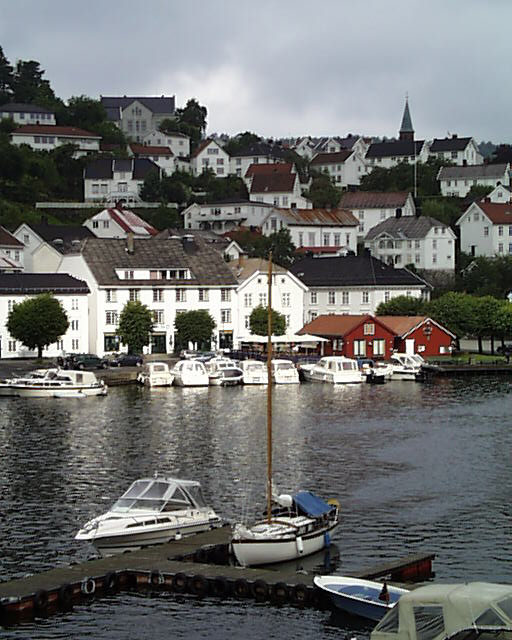
- View of Tvedestrand

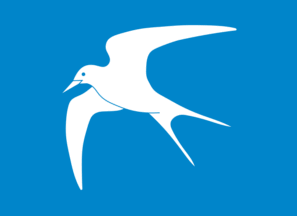
- Flag Coat of arms

- Agder within Norway

- Tvedestrand within Agder
- Coordinates: 58°37′26″N 08°55′40″E
- Country: Norway
- County: Agder
- District: Østre Agder
- Established: 1 Jan 1838
  - Created as: Formannskapsdistrikt
- Administrative centre: Tvedestrand

Government
  - Mayor (2020): Marianne Landaas (H)

Area
  - Total: 224.35 km^{2} (86.62 sq mi)
  - Land: 212.29 km^{2} (81.97 sq mi)
  - Water: 12.06 km^{2} (4.66 sq mi) 5.4%
  - Rank: #298 in Norway
- Highest elevation: 261.37 m (857.5 ft)

Population (2026)
  - Total: 6,430
  - Rank: #154 in Norway
  - Density: 30.3/km^{2} (78/sq mi)
  - Change (10 years): ▲ +6.9%
- Demonym: Tvedestrand-folk

Official language
  - Norwegian form: Bokmål
- Time zone: UTC+01:00 (CET)
  - Summer (DST): UTC+02:00 (CEST)
- ISO 3166 code: NO-4213
- Website: Official website

Tvedestrand is municipality in Agder county, Norway. It is located in the traditional district of Sørlandet. The administrative center is the town of Tvedestrand. There are many villages in the municipality including Dypvåg, Fiane, Gjeving, Goderstad, Grønland, Kilen, Klåholmen, Krokvåg, Laget, Lyngør, Nesgrenda, Østerå, Sagesund, Sandvika, and Songe.

The 224.35-square-kilometre (86.62 sq mi) municipality is the 298th largest by area out of the 357 municipalities in Norway. Tvedestrand Municipality is the 153rd most populous municipality in Norway with a population of 6,430. The municipality's population density is 30.3 inhabitants per square kilometre (78/sq mi) and its population has increased by 6.9% over the previous 10-year period.

The town of Tvedestrand has a white-painted town center with irregular streets climbing steep hills around the harbor. The natural environment of the area makes it a tourist destination. The municipality includes numerous islands, which makes it popular in the summer for boaters. The number of people in the municipality practically doubles in the summer, due to vacationers. There are approximately 1,700 summer cottages (hytter) around the fjord and coastal areas. Tvedestrand has over 2,000 buildings that are more than 100 years old.

== General information ==
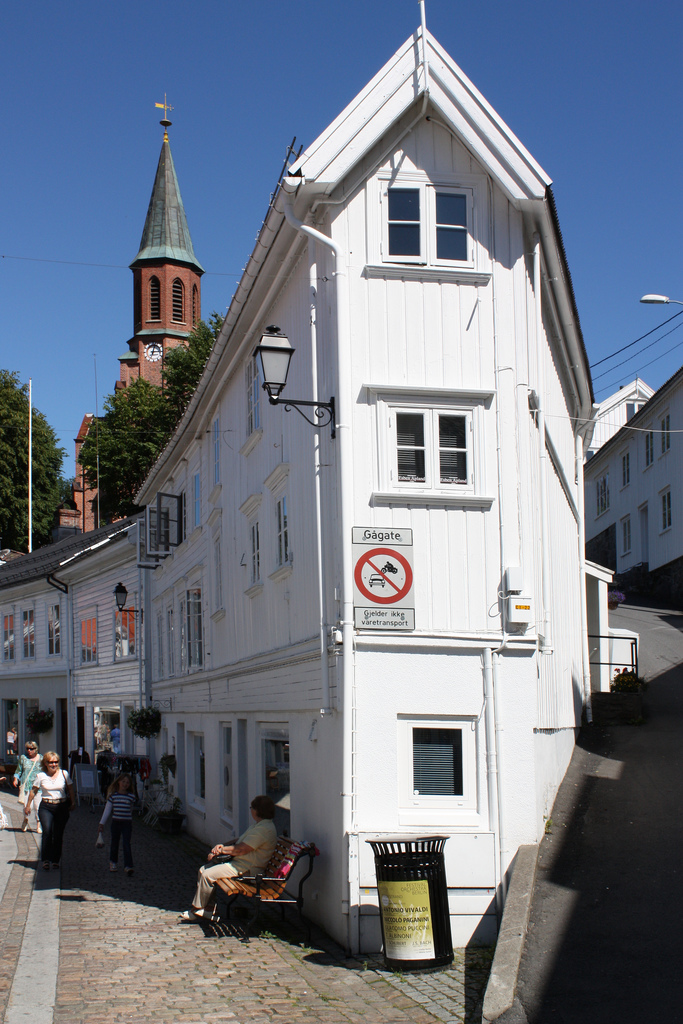
From the town centre of Tvedestrand

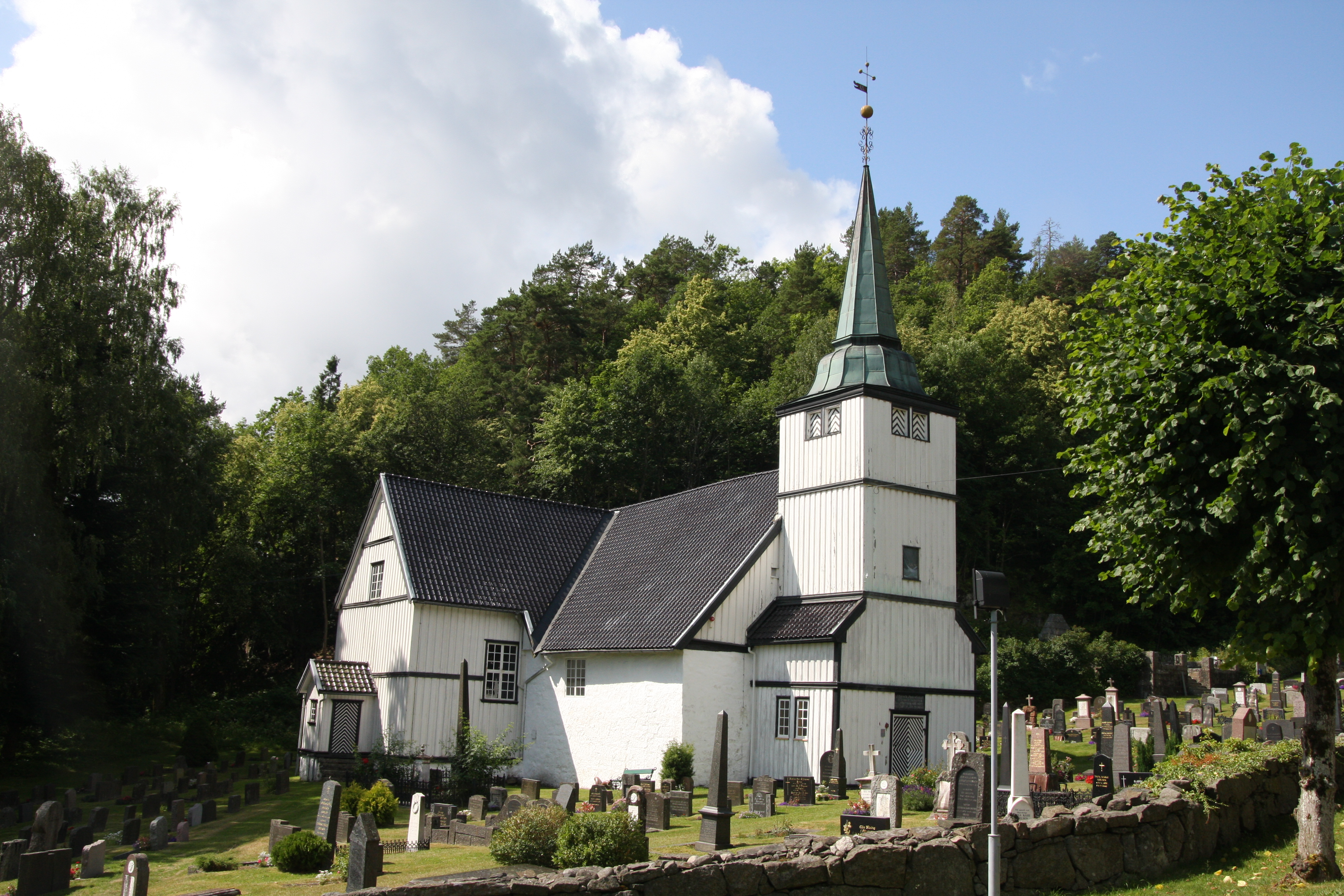
Dypvåg Church

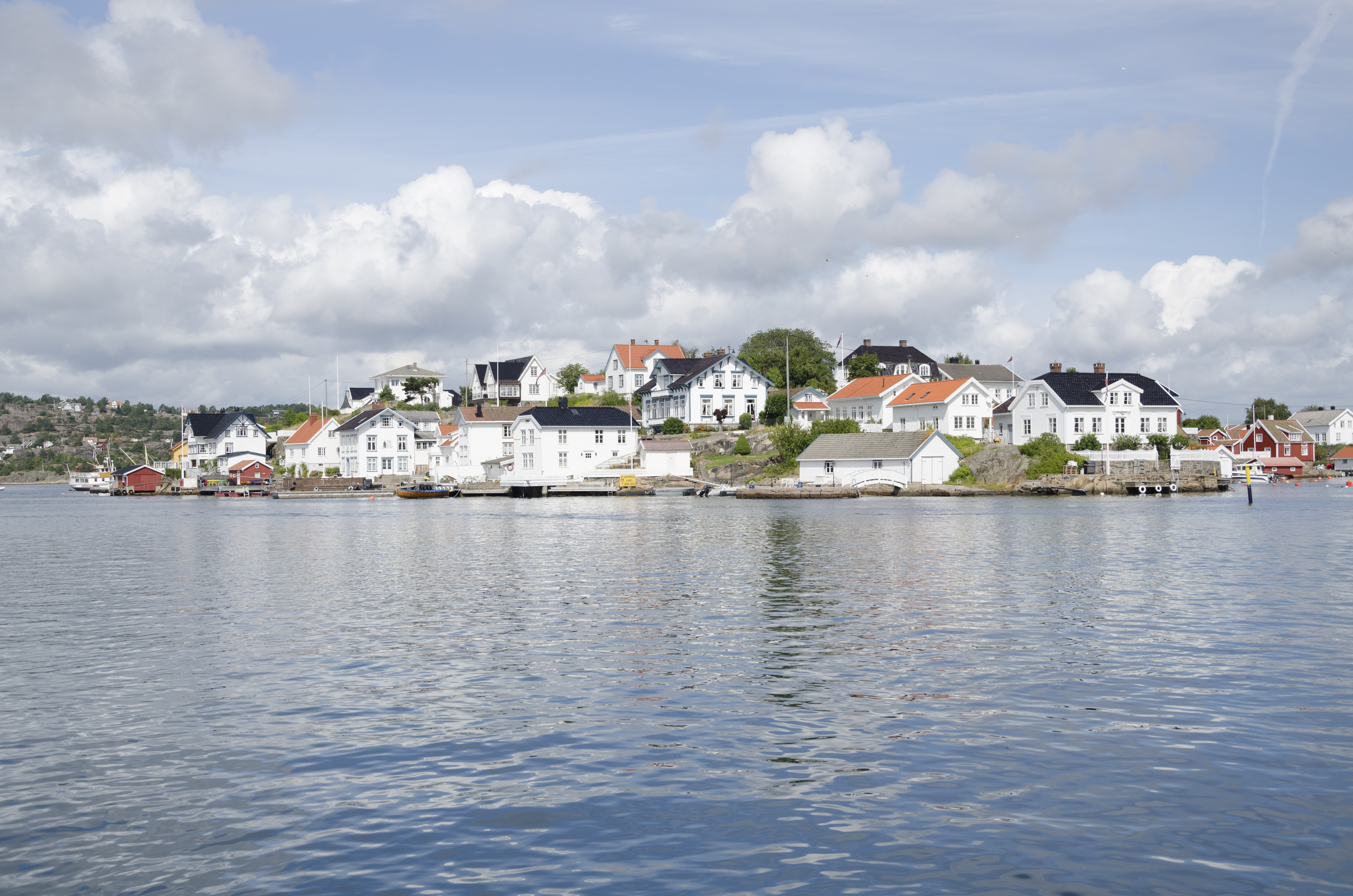
View of the village of Lyngør

=== Administrative history ===
The ladested of Tvedestrand was established as a municipality on 1 January 1838 (see formannskapsdistrikt law).

During the 1960s, there were many municipal mergers across Norway due to the work of the Schei Committee. On 1 January 1960, the following areas were merged to form an enlarged Tvedestrand Municipality:

- all of Tvedestrand Municipality (population: 868)
- all of Dypvåg Municipality (population: 1,805)
- all of Holt Municipality (population: 3,759)

On 1 January 1962, the Strengereid area (population: 375) of Tvedestrand Municipality was transferred to the neighboring Moland Municipality. Then on 1 January 1964, the Holtegården area (population: 5) was transferred from Moland Muncipality to Tvedestrand Muncipality. On 1 January 1984, the uninhabited Folevatnet area in Tvedestrand Muncipality was transferred to the neighboring Risør Municipality.

In 2020, there were many municipal and county mergers across Norway due to the work of the Solberg cabinet. Historically, this municipality was part of the old Aust-Agder county. On 1 January 2020, the municipality became a part of the newly-formed Agder county (after Aust-Agder and Vest-Agder counties were merged).

On 1 January 2025, the 9.5-square-kilometre (3.7 sq mi) Røysland area (population: 100) was transferred from Risør Municipality to the neighboring Tvedestrand Municipality.

=== Name ===
The town and municipality is named after the old Tveite farm (Old Norse: Þveitar) since that is the location of the present town of Tvedestrand. The first element is the farm name which is the genitive case of the word þveit which means "clearing" or "small farm". The last element is strǫnd which means "beach" or "strand". Thus this is the beach of the Tveit farm.

=== Coat of arms ===
The coat of arms was granted on 4 April 1986. The official blazon is "Azure, a tern volant argent" (Norwegian: I blått en oppflyvende sølv terne). This means the arms have a blue field (background) and the charge is a tern, a type of local seabird. The tern has a tincture of argent which means it is commonly colored white, but if it is made out of metal, then silver is used. The blue color in the field and the tern were chosen to represent the sea since the municipality was historically dependent on it for its economy. The arms were designed by Daniel Rike. The municipal flag has the same design as the coat of arms.

=== Churches ===
The Church of Norway has three parishes (sokn) within Tvedestrand Muncipality. It is part of the Aust-Nedenes prosti (deanery) in the Diocese of Agder og Telemark.

Churches in Tvedestrand Muncipality
Parish (sokn)	Church name	Location of the church	Year built
Dypvåg	Dypvåg Church	Dypvåg	c. 1200
Holt	Holt Church	Fiane	c. 1100
Holt	Laget Church	Laget	1908
Tvedestrand	Tvedestrand Church	Tvedestrand	1861

== History ==
Holt Church probably dates from the twelfth century and it has an ancient baptismal font. The interior was decorated by Torsten Hoff.

Around 1600, Tvedestrand was mainly a harbour for the Berge and Tveite farms' boats, hence the name Tvedestrand (strand means beach or coast in Norwegian).

Lyngør was the site of the Battle of Lyngør between English and Dano-Norwegian forces during the Napoleonic Wars resulting in the sinking of the frigate of the Dano-Norwegian forces, Najaden by the British ship-of-the-line Dictator in 1812.

The town, as it now exists, was built in the 19th century as a harbour for Norway's longest existing iron works, Næs jernverk. Lying in the parish of Holt, Næs jernverk has one of the largest and most significant of the surviving mansions in Sørlandet, built by Ulrich Schnell. Schnell bought up various iron works in the neighborhood and set up several sawmills in the district. He obtained a special license to export timber directly from Tvedestrand, establishing the basis for an international harbor.

== Government ==
Tvedestrand Municipality is responsible for primary education (through 10th grade), outpatient health services, senior citizen services, welfare and other social services, zoning, economic development, and municipal roads and utilities. The municipality is governed by a municipal council of directly elected representatives. The mayor is indirectly elected by a vote of the municipal council. The municipality is under the jurisdiction of the Agder District Court and the Agder Court of Appeal.

=== Municipal council ===
The municipal council (Kommunestyre) of Tvedestrand Municipality is made up of 23 representatives that are elected to four-year terms. The tables below show the current and historical composition of the council by political party.

Tvedestrand kommunestyre 2023–2027
Party name (in Norwegian)	Number of representatives
Labour Party (Arbeiderpartiet)	5
Progress Party (Fremskrittspartiet)	2
Conservative Party (Høyre)	7
Industry and Business Party (Industri‑ og Næringspartiet)	2
Christian Democratic Party (Kristelig Folkeparti)	1
Centre Party (Senterpartiet)	3
Socialist Left Party (Sosialistisk Venstreparti)	2
Liberal Party (Venstre)	1
Total number of members:	23

Tvedestrand kommunestyre 2019–2023
Party name (in Norwegian)	Number of representatives
Labour Party (Arbeiderpartiet)	5
Progress Party (Fremskrittspartiet)	1
Conservative Party (Høyre)	5
Christian Democratic Party (Kristelig Folkeparti)	1
Centre Party (Senterpartiet)	5
Liberal Party (Venstre)	2
Xtra-List (Xtra-lista)	4
Total number of members:	23

Tvedestrand kommunestyre 2015–2019
Party name (in Norwegian)	Number of representatives
Labour Party (Arbeiderpartiet)	6
Progress Party (Fremskrittspartiet)	1
Green Party (Miljøpartiet De Grønne)	1
Conservative Party (Høyre)	3
Christian Democratic Party (Kristelig Folkeparti)	1
Centre Party (Senterpartiet)	4
Liberal Party (Venstre)	2
Tvedestrand Cross-party List (Tvedestrand Tverrpolitiske Liste)	7
Total number of members:	25

Tvedestrand kommunestyre 2011–2015
Party name (in Norwegian)	Number of representatives
Labour Party (Arbeiderpartiet)	6
Progress Party (Fremskrittspartiet)	1
Conservative Party (Høyre)	4
Christian Democratic Party (Kristelig Folkeparti)	2
Centre Party (Senterpartiet)	3
Liberal Party (Venstre)	1
Tvedestrand Cross-party List (Tvedestrand Tverrpolitiske Liste)	8
Total number of members:	25

Tvedestrand kommunestyre 2007–2011
Party name (in Norwegian)	Number of representatives
Labour Party (Arbeiderpartiet)	4
Conservative Party (Høyre)	5
Christian Democratic Party (Kristelig Folkeparti)	2
Centre Party (Senterpartiet)	4
Socialist Left Party (Sosialistisk Venstreparti)	2
Liberal Party (Venstre)	1
Tvedestrand cross-party list (Tvedestrand tverrpolitiske liste)	7
Total number of members:	25

Tvedestrand kommunestyre 2003–2007
Party name (in Norwegian)	Number of representatives
Labour Party (Arbeiderpartiet)	5
Progress Party (Fremskrittspartiet)	2
Conservative Party (Høyre)	2
Christian Democratic Party (Kristelig Folkeparti)	3
Centre Party (Senterpartiet)	2
Socialist Left Party (Sosialistisk Venstreparti)	3
Tvedestrand cross-party list (Tvedestrand Tverrpolitiske Liste)	8
Total number of members:	25

Tvedestrand kommunestyre 1999–2003
Party name (in Norwegian)	Number of representatives
Labour Party (Arbeiderpartiet)	6
Progress Party (Fremskrittspartiet)	2
Conservative Party (Høyre)	4
Christian Democratic Party (Kristelig Folkeparti)	5
Centre Party (Senterpartiet)	4
Socialist Left Party (Sosialistisk Venstreparti)	2
Liberal Party (Venstre)	1
Tvedestrand cross-party list (Tvedestrand tverrpolitisk liste)	5
Total number of members:	29

Tvedestrand kommunestyre 1995–1999
Party name (in Norwegian)	Number of representatives
Labour Party (Arbeiderpartiet)	7
Conservative Party (Høyre)	4
Christian Democratic Party (Kristelig Folkeparti)	3
Centre Party (Senterpartiet)	5
Socialist Left Party (Sosialistisk Venstreparti)	1
Liberal Party (Venstre)	1
Tvedestrand cross-party list (Tvedestrand tverrpolitiske liste)	8
Total number of members:	29

Tvedestrand kommunestyre 1991–1995
Party name (in Norwegian)	Number of representatives
Labour Party (Arbeiderpartiet)	7
Progress Party (Fremskrittspartiet)	4
Conservative Party (Høyre)	5
Christian Democratic Party (Kristelig Folkeparti)	3
Centre Party (Senterpartiet)	5
Socialist Left Party (Sosialistisk Venstreparti)	3
Liberal Party (Venstre)	2
Total number of members:	29

Tvedestrand kommunestyre 1987–1991
Party name (in Norwegian)	Number of representatives
Labour Party (Arbeiderpartiet)	9
Progress Party (Fremskrittspartiet)	4
Conservative Party (Høyre)	6
Christian Democratic Party (Kristelig Folkeparti)	3
Centre Party (Senterpartiet)	4
Socialist Left Party (Sosialistisk Venstreparti)	1
Joint list of the Liberal Party (Venstre) and Liberal People's Party (Liberale Folkepartiet)	2
Total number of members:	29

Tvedestrand kommunestyre 1983–1987
Party name (in Norwegian)	Number of representatives
Labour Party (Arbeiderpartiet)	10
Progress Party (Fremskrittspartiet)	3
Conservative Party (Høyre)	7
Christian Democratic Party (Kristelig Folkeparti)	4
Liberal People's Party (Liberale Folkepartiet)	1
Centre Party (Senterpartiet)	2
Liberal Party (Venstre)	2
Total number of members:	29

Tvedestrand kommunestyre 1979–1983
Party name (in Norwegian)	Number of representatives
Labour Party (Arbeiderpartiet)	9
Progress Party (Fremskrittspartiet)	2
Conservative Party (Høyre)	8
Christian Democratic Party (Kristelig Folkeparti)	4
New People's Party (Nye Folkepartiet)	1
Centre Party (Senterpartiet)	2
Liberal Party (Venstre)	3
Total number of members:	29

Tvedestrand kommunestyre 1975–1979
Party name (in Norwegian)	Number of representatives
Labour Party (Arbeiderpartiet)	9
Conservative Party (Høyre)	8
Christian Democratic Party (Kristelig Folkeparti)	6
Centre Party (Senterpartiet)	3
Joint list of the Liberal Party (Venstre) and New People's Party (Nye Folkepartiet)	3
Total number of members:	29

Tvedestrand kommunestyre 1971–1975
Party name (in Norwegian)	Number of representatives
Labour Party (Arbeiderpartiet)	11
Conservative Party (Høyre)	5
Christian Democratic Party (Kristelig Folkeparti)	4
Centre Party (Senterpartiet)	4
Liberal Party (Venstre)	5
Total number of members:	29

Tvedestrand kommunestyre 1967–1971
Party name (in Norwegian)	Number of representatives
Labour Party (Arbeiderpartiet)	13
Conservative Party (Høyre)	9
Christian Democratic Party (Kristelig Folkeparti)	5
Centre Party (Senterpartiet)	4
Liberal Party (Venstre)	6
Total number of members:	37

Tvedestrand kommunestyre 1963–1967
Party name (in Norwegian)	Number of representatives
Labour Party (Arbeiderpartiet)	14
Conservative Party (Høyre)	8
Christian Democratic Party (Kristelig Folkeparti)	4
Centre Party (Senterpartiet)	4
Liberal Party (Venstre)	7
Total number of members:	37

Tvedestrand kommunestyre 1959–1963
Party name (in Norwegian)	Number of representatives
Labour Party (Arbeiderpartiet)	13
Conservative Party (Høyre)	7
Christian Democratic Party (Kristelig Folkeparti)	4
Centre Party (Senterpartiet)	4
Liberal Party (Venstre)	8
Local List(s) (Lokale lister)	1
Total number of members:	37

Tvedestrand bystyre 1955–1959
Party name (in Norwegian)	Number of representatives
Labour Party (Arbeiderpartiet)	5
Conservative Party (Høyre)	8
Joint List(s) of Non-Socialist Parties (Borgerlige Felleslister)	6
Local List(s) (Lokale lister)	2
Total number of members:	21

Tvedestrand bystyre 1951–1955
Party name (in Norwegian)	Number of representatives
Labour Party (Arbeiderpartiet)	5
Conservative Party (Høyre)	8
Liberal Party (Venstre)	5
Local List(s) (Lokale lister)	2
Total number of members:	20

Tvedestrand bystyre 1947–1951
Party name (in Norwegian)	Number of representatives
Labour Party (Arbeiderpartiet)	6
Joint List(s) of Non-Socialist Parties (Borgerlige Felleslister)	14
Total number of members:	20

Tvedestrand bystyre 1945–1947
Party name (in Norwegian)	Number of representatives
Labour Party (Arbeiderpartiet)	7
Joint List(s) of Non-Socialist Parties (Borgerlige Felleslister)	7
Local List(s) (Lokale lister)	6
Total number of members:	20

Tvedestrand bystyre 1937–1941*
Party name (in Norwegian)	Number of representatives
Labour Party (Arbeiderpartiet)	3
Conservative Party (Høyre)	10
Local List(s) (Lokale lister)	7
Total number of members:	20
Note: Due to the German occupation of Norway during World War II, no elections were held for new municipal councils until after the war ended in 1945.

Tvedestrand bystyre 1934–1937
Party name (in Norwegian)	Number of representatives
Labour Party (Arbeiderpartiet)	3
Joint List(s) of Non-Socialist Parties (Borgerlige Felleslister)	17
Total number of members:	20

=== Mayors ===
The mayor (Norwegian: ordfører) of Tvedestrand Municipality is the political leader of the municipality and the chairperson of the municipal council. The following people have held this position:

- 1838–1840: Christian Holm
- 1841–1842: Mads H. Smith
- 1843–1846: Christian Holm
- 1847–1848: Mads H. Smith
- 1849–1849: Even Jørgensen
- 1850–1851: Henrik Schäffer
- 1852–1852: Even Jørgensen
- 1853–1853: Mads H. Smith
- 1854–1856: Johannes Holm
- 1857–1864: S. Lund
- 1865–1882: Fritz Smith
- 1882–1885: A.M. Arntsen
- 1886–1894: Ole Reiersen Lilleholt (V)
- 1894–1895: Severin Jorkjend
- 1896–1896: Andreas Biering Olsen
- 1897–1897: Godtfred Milberg
- 1898–1898: Andreas Biering Olsen
- 1899–1900: Lars Grundesen
- 1901–1904: Th. Hegland
- 1905–1906: Godtfred Milberg
- 1906–1909: Peder Christoffersen
- 1909–1910: Sv. Svensen
- 1910–1910: A.H. Grundesen
- 1911–1917: Jakob Ørbæk
- 1918–1919: A.H. Lindland
- 1920–1923: Johan W. Wroldsen
- 1924–1925: Kristen Bråten
- 1926–1930: Andreas Bjelland
- 1931–1931: Johan W. Wroldsen
- 1932–1934: Andorf Bjørnlund
- 1935–1940: Arnfinn Eskild
- 1945–1945: Halvor Slotta
- 1946–1946: Oluf Olsen
- 1947–1947: Birger Jorkjend
- 1948–1949: Egil Eide
- 1950–1954: Arnold Jorkjend
- 1955–1955: Egil Rosland
- 1956–1957: Olaf R. Walle
- 1958–1959: Egil Rosland
- 1960–1967: Albert Albretsen (V)
- 1968–1971: Jens Marcussen (H)
- 1972–1973: Albert Albretsen (V)
- 1974–1979: Erich Mørch (H)
- 1980–1983: Per B. Marcussen (H)
- 1984–1987: Karl Løhaugen (KrF)
- 1988–1991: Per Tveite (Sp)
- 1992–1995: May Britt Lunde (Ap)
- 1995–2003: Torleif Haugland (KrF)
- 2003–2019: Jan Dukene (LL)
- 2019–present: Marianne Landaas (H)

== Geography ==
Tvedestrand Municipality lies along the Skagerrak coast between the coastal towns of Arendal to the southwest and Risør to the northeast. Vegårshei Municipality lies to the north, Risør Municipality lies to the northeast, the Skagerrak lies to the east, Arendal Municipality lies to the south, Froland Municipality lies to the southwest, and Åmli Municipality lies to the west.

Tvedestrand belongs to the geographical region of Sørlandet in the Østre Agder area of Agder county. The town itself lies at the end of a picturesque fjord, Tvedestrandfjorden, which is the name for the inner part of the Oksefjorden (originally Ufsefjorden, meaning the fjord with steep, rocky sides). The municipality also encompasses the islands Borøy, Sandøy, and Askerøya as well as the unique village of Lyngør which lies on several small islands. Lyngør was acclaimed "Europe's best preserved village" by Europa Nostra in 1991. Lyngør Lighthouse is located by the village. Tvedestrand Municipality includes 162 islands, with a collected coastline of 214 kilometres (133 mi).

The river Storelva, one of the Southern Coast's best salmon and sea trout rivers, flows past the Næs jernverk and ultimately out into the Sandnesfjorden. The highest point in the municipality is the 261.37-metre (857.5 ft) tall mountain Ansmyrheia.

=== Climate ===
There are two climate zones in Tvedestrand under the Köppen classification. The outermost coast, influenced by the sea, experience a temperate oceanic climate (Köppen: Cfb), while the inner parts have a warm-summer humid continental climate (Köppen: Dfb), with temperatures in the coldest month typically averaging below 0°C. This means that snow cover can be inconsistent at the coast during winter, but is more reliable farther away from the coast. The town of Tvedestrand is somewhere in-between the two climate zones, with average temperatures in January and February hovering around 0°C. Daily highs in the town during July typically reach 21-22°C.

Lyngør Lighthouse is located about 13 kilometres (8.1 mi) from the town of Tvedestrand and has data going back to 1920. The station shows a typical climate for the outermost coast of the municipality. There, autumn is the wettest season and spring the driest. The all-time high temperature recorded here is 29.8 °C (85.6 °F), set on 12 August 1975.

Climate data for Lyngør Lighthouse 1991-2020 (4 m)
Month	Jan	Feb	Mar	Apr	May	Jun	Jul	Aug	Sep	Oct	Nov	Dec	Year
Mean daily maximum °C (°F)	3.4 (38.1)	3.1 (37.6)	5.5 (41.9)	9.1 (48.4)	13.9 (57.0)	17.7 (63.9)	20 (68)	19.6 (67.3)	16.1 (61.0)	11.2 (52.2)	7.1 (44.8)	4.2 (39.6)	10.9 (51.7)
Daily mean °C (°F)	1.2 (34.2)	0.7 (33.3)	2.6 (36.7)	6.1 (43.0)	10.8 (51.4)	14.7 (58.5)	17 (63)	16.8 (62.2)	13.5 (56.3)	8.9 (48.0)	5.1 (41.2)	2.1 (35.8)	8.3 (47.0)
Mean daily minimum °C (°F)	−0.7 (30.7)	−1.3 (29.7)	0.4 (32.7)	3.8 (38.8)	8.3 (46.9)	12.1 (53.8)	14.4 (57.9)	14.3 (57.7)	11.2 (52.2)	6.9 (44.4)	3.2 (37.8)	0.2 (32.4)	6.1 (42.9)
Average precipitation mm (inches)	86 (3.4)	61 (2.4)	59 (2.3)	52 (2.0)	67 (2.6)	67 (2.6)	81 (3.2)	108 (4.3)	102 (4.0)	130 (5.1)	114 (4.5)	91 (3.6)	1,018 (40)
Source 1: Yr (precipitation)
Source 2: NOAA - WMO averages 91-2020 Norway

=== Geology ===
A number of rare minerals are found in Tvedestrand Municipality:

- Sunstone, a rare feldspar exhibiting in certain directions a brilliant spangled appearance, which has led to its use as a gemstone.
- A rare yttrium phosphate mineral Xenotime.
- Thulite (also called rosaline), an opaque, massive pink variety of the mineral zoisite.

== Attractions ==
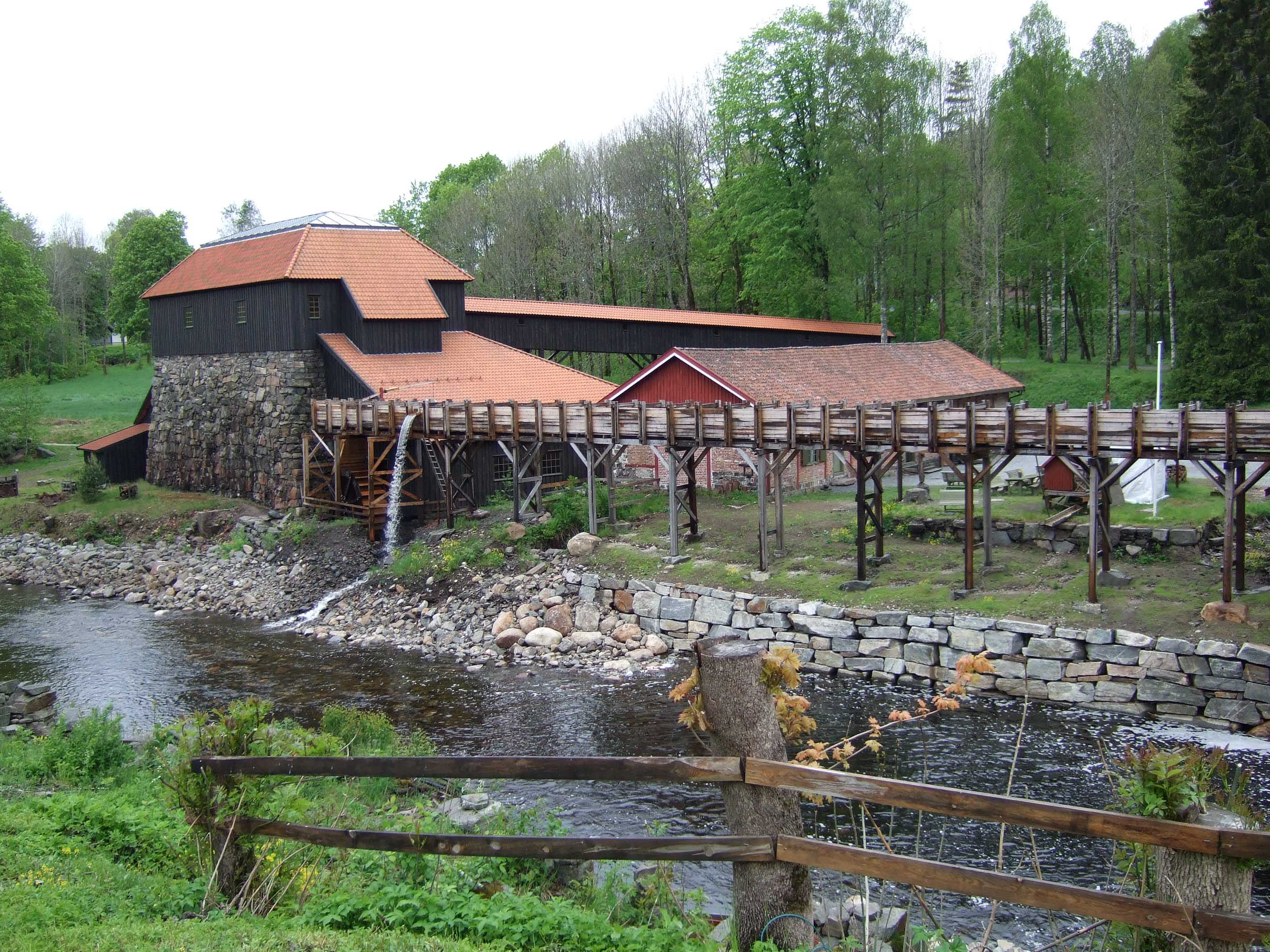
Næs verk

- The 18th century Næs jernverk are 7 kilometres (4.3 mi) from the town center.
- Tvedestrand is recognized as a book town, a small village with a large number of second-hand or antiquarian book shops.
- Interesting Places in Tvedestrand municipality:
  - Lyngør, a cluster of offshore islands which have been described as the 'Skagerrak Venice' and proclaimed by the European Commission to be “Europe’s best preserved village.”
  - Sagesund village
  - Sandøya island, including the villages of Kilen and Klåholmen
  - Borøya island

== Notable people ==
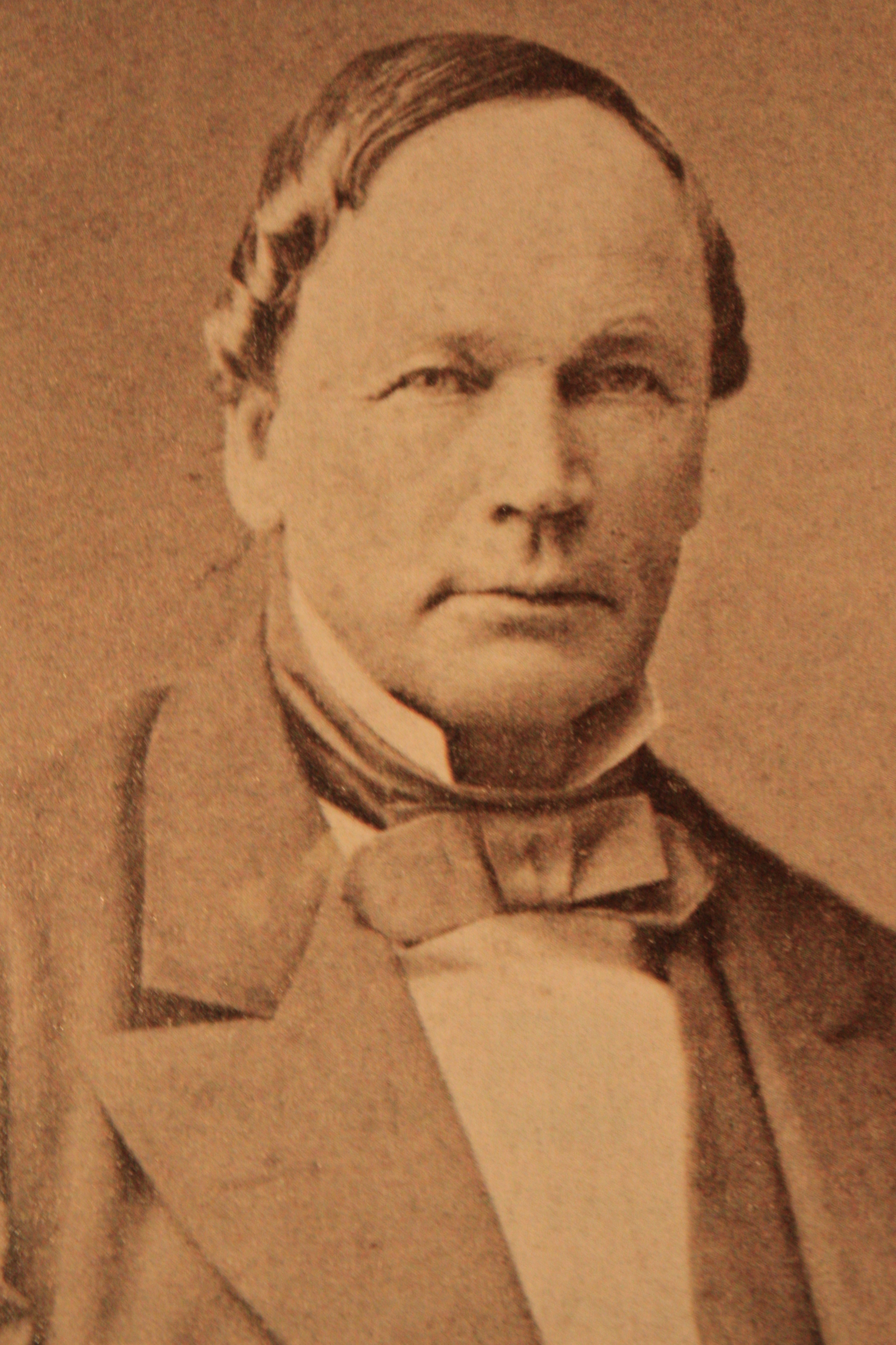
Knud Knudsen

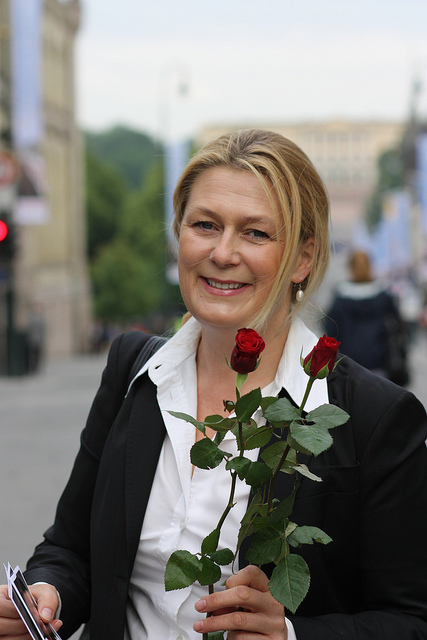
Gina Lund, 2012

- Peder Johnsen (1783 in Tvedestrand – 1836), a sailor who was a representative at the Norwegian Constituent Assembly
- Knud Knudsen (1812 in Tvedestrand – 1895), an educator, author, linguist, and philologist
- Elise Wærenskjold (1815 in Dypvåg – 1895), a Norwegian-American writer, temperance leader, and early pioneer in Texas
- Erik Eriksen (1820 in Lyngør – 1888), a polar captain
- Arne Garborg (1851–1924), an author who founded and edited the Tvedestrandsposten newspaper (still published in 2019)
- Jens Holmboe (1880 in Tvedestrand – 1943), a botanist, professor, and author
- Theo Findahl (1891 in Tvedestrand – 1976), a teacher, journalist, and foreign correspondent
- Alfred Engelsen (1893 – 1966 in Tvedestrand), a gymnast and diver who was team gold medallist at the 1912 Summer Olympics
- Kristian Vilhelm Koren Schjelderup Jr. (1894 in Dypvåg – 1980), a Norwegian Lutheran theologian, author, and bishop of the Diocese of Hamar 1947 to 1964
- Harald K. Schjelderup (1895 in Dypvåg – 1974), a physicist, philosopher, and psychologist; Norway's first professor of psychology
- Rolv Werner Erichsen (1899 in Holt – 1988), a newspaper editor
- Trond Bergh (born 1946 in Tvedestrand), an economic historian, writer, and academic
- Ketil Bjørnstad (born 1952), a pianist, composer, and author who lived in Tvedestrand in the 1970s and 1980s (his psychological thriller Twilight is based there)
- Gina Lund (born 1962), a civil servant and politician who was brought up in Tvedestrand
- Jenny Hval (born 1980), a singer-songwriter, record producer, musician, and novelist

== International relations ==
=== Twin towns — Sister cities ===
Tvedestrand has sister city agreements with the following places:

- Lysekil, Västra Götaland County, Sweden
