= Askerøya =

Island in Agder, Norway

- Interactive map of the island

Geography
- Location: Agder, Norway
- Coordinates: 58.6222°N 09.1024°E
- Area: 2.45 km^{2} (0.95 sq mi)
- Length: 4.5 km (2.8 mi)
- Width: 750 m (2460 ft)
- Highest elevation: 44 m (144 ft)
- Highest point: Flaufjell

Administration
- Norway
- County: Agder
- Municipality: Tvedestrand Municipality

Askerøya is an island in Tvedestrand Municipality in Agder county, Norway. The 2.46-square-kilometre (610-acre) island lies along the Skagerrak coast. The island is just southwest of the Lyngør area and just northeast of the islands of Borøya and Sandøya. There is no road connection to the island other than via a ferry. The highest point on the island is the 44-metre (144 ft) tall hill called Flaufjell.

== See also ==
- List of islands of Norway
