= Gjeving =

Village in Tvedestrand Municipality, Norway

- Village
- Interactive map of Gjeving
- Coordinates: 58.6479°N 09.1239°E
- Country: Norway
- Region: Southern Norway
- County: Agder
- District: Østre Agder
- Municipality: Tvedestrand Municipality
- Elevation: 2 m (6.6 ft)
- Time zone: UTC+01:00 (CET)
  - Summer (DST): UTC+02:00 (CEST)
- Post Code: 4912 Gjeving

Gjeving is a village in Tvedestrand Municipality in Agder county, Norway. The village is located along the Skagerrak coast, just off Norwegian County Road 411, about 15 kilometres (9.3 mi) east of the town of Tvedestrand and about 5 kilometres (3.1 mi) east of the village of Dypvåg. The island village of Lyngør lies just offshore to the south of Gjeving.

== Climate ==
Climate data for Lyngør Lighthouse 1991-2020 (4 m)
Month	Jan	Feb	Mar	Apr	May	Jun	Jul	Aug	Sep	Oct	Nov	Dec	Year
Mean daily maximum °C (°F)	3.4 (38.1)	3.1 (37.6)	5.5 (41.9)	9.1 (48.4)	13.9 (57.0)	17.7 (63.9)	20 (68)	19.6 (67.3)	16.1 (61.0)	11.2 (52.2)	7.1 (44.8)	4.2 (39.6)	10.9 (51.7)
Daily mean °C (°F)	1.2 (34.2)	0.7 (33.3)	2.6 (36.7)	6.1 (43.0)	10.8 (51.4)	14.7 (58.5)	17 (63)	16.8 (62.2)	13.5 (56.3)	8.9 (48.0)	5.1 (41.2)	2.1 (35.8)	8.3 (47.0)
Mean daily minimum °C (°F)	−0.7 (30.7)	−1.3 (29.7)	0.4 (32.7)	3.8 (38.8)	8.3 (46.9)	12.1 (53.8)	14.4 (57.9)	14.3 (57.7)	11.2 (52.2)	6.9 (44.4)	3.2 (37.8)	0.2 (32.4)	6.1 (42.9)
Average precipitation mm (inches)	86 (3.4)	61 (2.4)	59 (2.3)	52 (2.0)	67 (2.6)	67 (2.6)	81 (3.2)	108 (4.3)	102 (4.0)	130 (5.1)	114 (4.5)	91 (3.6)	1,018 (40)
Source 1: Yr (precipitation)
Source 2: NOAA - WMO averages 91-2020 Norway
