= Klåholmen =

Village in Tvedestrand Municipality, Norway

- Village
- Interactive map of Klåholmen
- Coordinates: 58.5977°N 09.0741°E
- Country: Norway
- Region: Southern Norway
- County: Agder
- District: Østre Agder
- Municipality: Tvedestrand Municipality
- Elevation: 5 m (16 ft)
- Time zone: UTC+01:00 (CET)
  - Summer (DST): UTC+02:00 (CEST)
- Post Code: 4915 Vestre Sandøya

Klåholmen is a village in Tvedestrand Municipality in Agder county, Norway. The village is located on the island of Sandøya, midway between the popular tourist destinations of Kilsund and Lyngør. The village is located about 12 kilometres (7.5 mi) southeast of the town of Tvedestrand on the mainland and about 2.5 kilometres (1.6 mi) northeast of the village of Kilen on the other end of the island.
