= Kilen, Tvedestrand =

Village in Tvedestrand Municipality, Norway

Kilen
- Village
- Interactive map of Kilen
- Coordinates: 58.5859°N 09.0397°E
- Country: Norway
- Region: Southern Norway
- County: Agder
- District: Østre Agder
- Municipality: Tvedestrand Municipality
- Elevation: 1 m (3.3 ft)
- Time zone: UTC+01:00 (CET)
  - Summer (DST): UTC+02:00 (CEST)
- Post Code: 4915 Vestre Sandøya

Kilen is a village in Tvedestrand Municipality in Agder county, Norway. The village is located on the island Sandøya, midway between the popular tourist destinations of Kilsund and Lyngør. The village is about 11 kilometres (6.8 mi) southeast of the town of Tvedestrand on the mainland and about 3 kilometres (1.9 mi) southwest of the village of Klåholmen on the other end of the island. The village (and island) is only accessible by boat.
