= Lyngør Lighthouse =

Coastal lighthouse in Tvedestrand, Norway

Lyngør Lighthouse Lyngør fyr
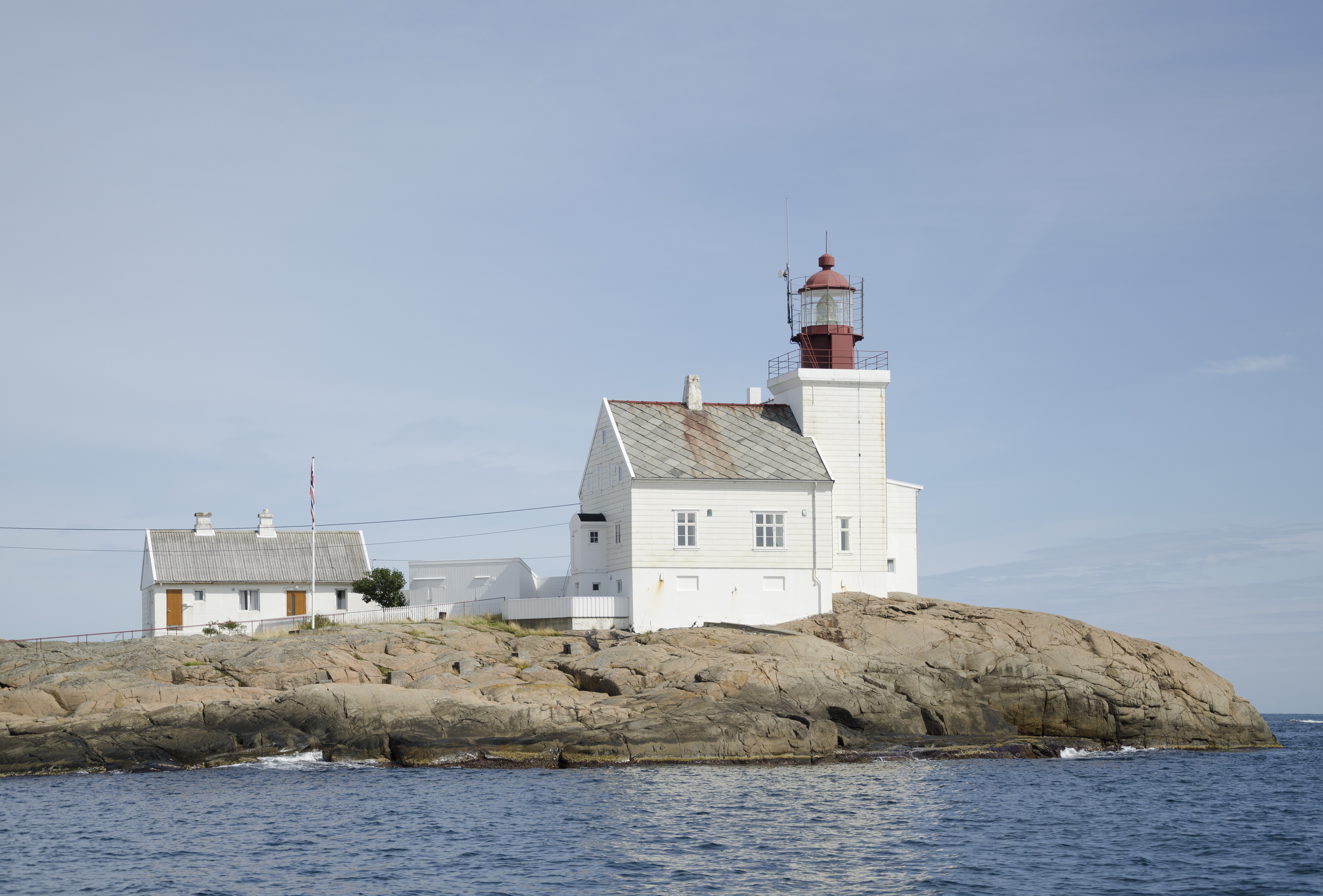
- View of the lighthouse
- Location: Agder, Norway
- Coordinates: 58.6359°N 09.1483°E

Tower
- Constructed: 1879
- Construction: Concrete tower
- Automated: 2004
- Height: 16.9 metres (55 ft)
- Shape: Square tower
- Markings: White with red top
- Operator: Norsk Fyrhistorisk Forening
- Heritage: cultural property, cultural heritage preservation in Norway
- Fog signal: None
- Racon: None

Light
- Focal height: 21.3 metres (70 ft)
- Lens: 3rd order Fresnel lens
- Intensity: 59,100 cd (fixed); 616,500 cd (flash)
- Range: 14 nmi (26 km; 16 mi)
- Characteristic: FFl W 60s
- Norway no.: 056600

Lyngør Lighthouse (Norwegian: Lyngør fyr) is a coastal lighthouse located on the island of Kjeholmen in the Lyngør area of Tvedestrand Municipality in Agder county, Norway. Established in 1879, the lighthouse was listed as a protected site in 1997. However, it was automated in 2004, and as a result, no one is stationed there any longer.

== Specifications ==
The Lyngør Lighthouse stands at a height of 16.9-metre (55 ft) and is characterized by its white, square, concrete tower with a red top, which is connected to a 2 1/2-story keeper's house. Positioned at an elevation of 21.3 metres (70 ft) above sea level, the light emits a continuous white glow, punctuated by a brighter flash once every 60 seconds. The lighthouse features an original 3rd order Fresnel lens mounted on the original rotating mechanism, with an intensity of 59,100 candela for the light and 616,500 candela for the flash. The light can be seen from all directions for up to 14 nautical miles (26 km; 16 mi). The facility is only accessible by boat, but the site is open to the public, and the keeper's house and tower are open as well, in fact, the building can be rented out for overnight accommodations.

== Media gallery ==
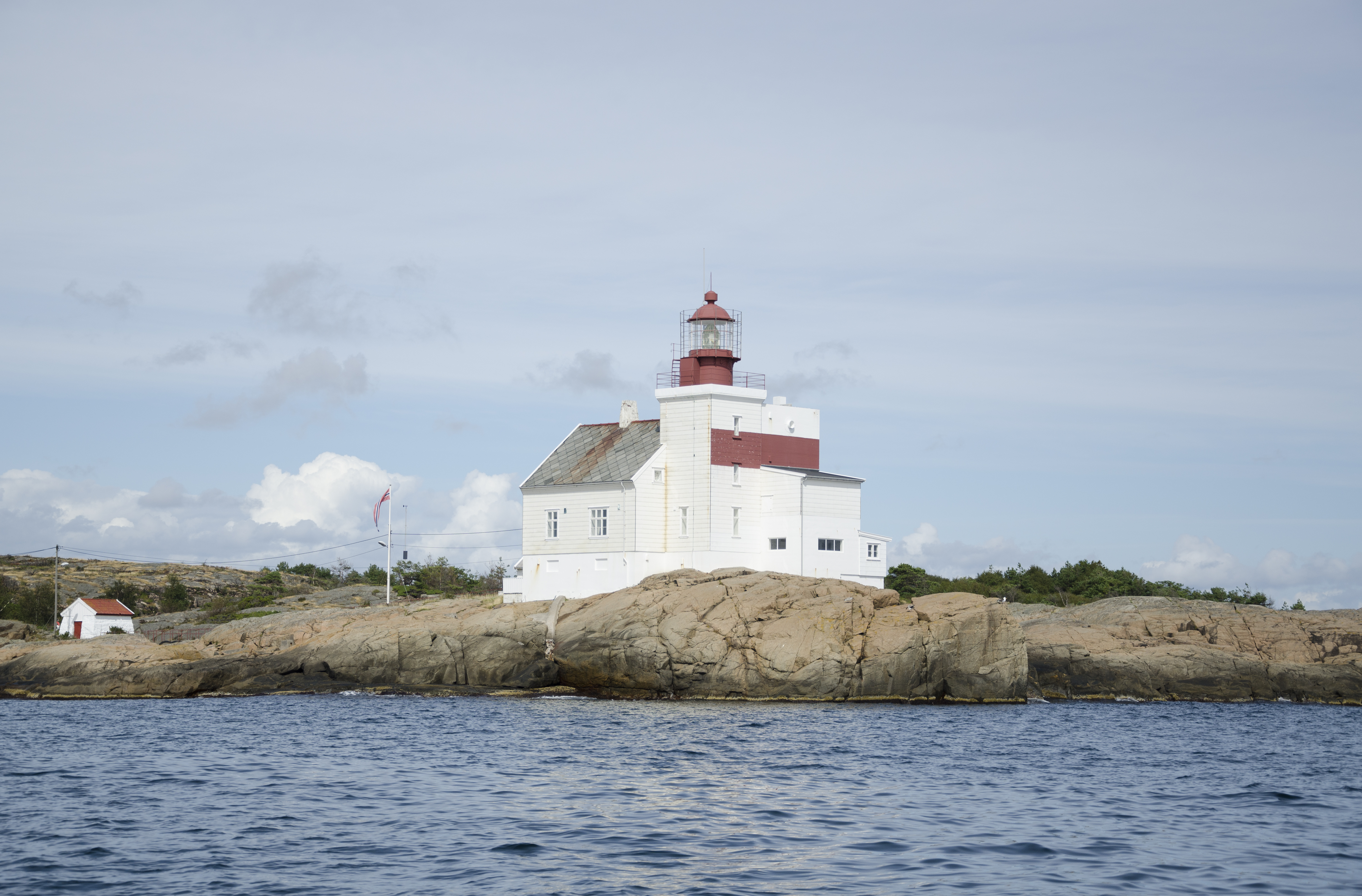

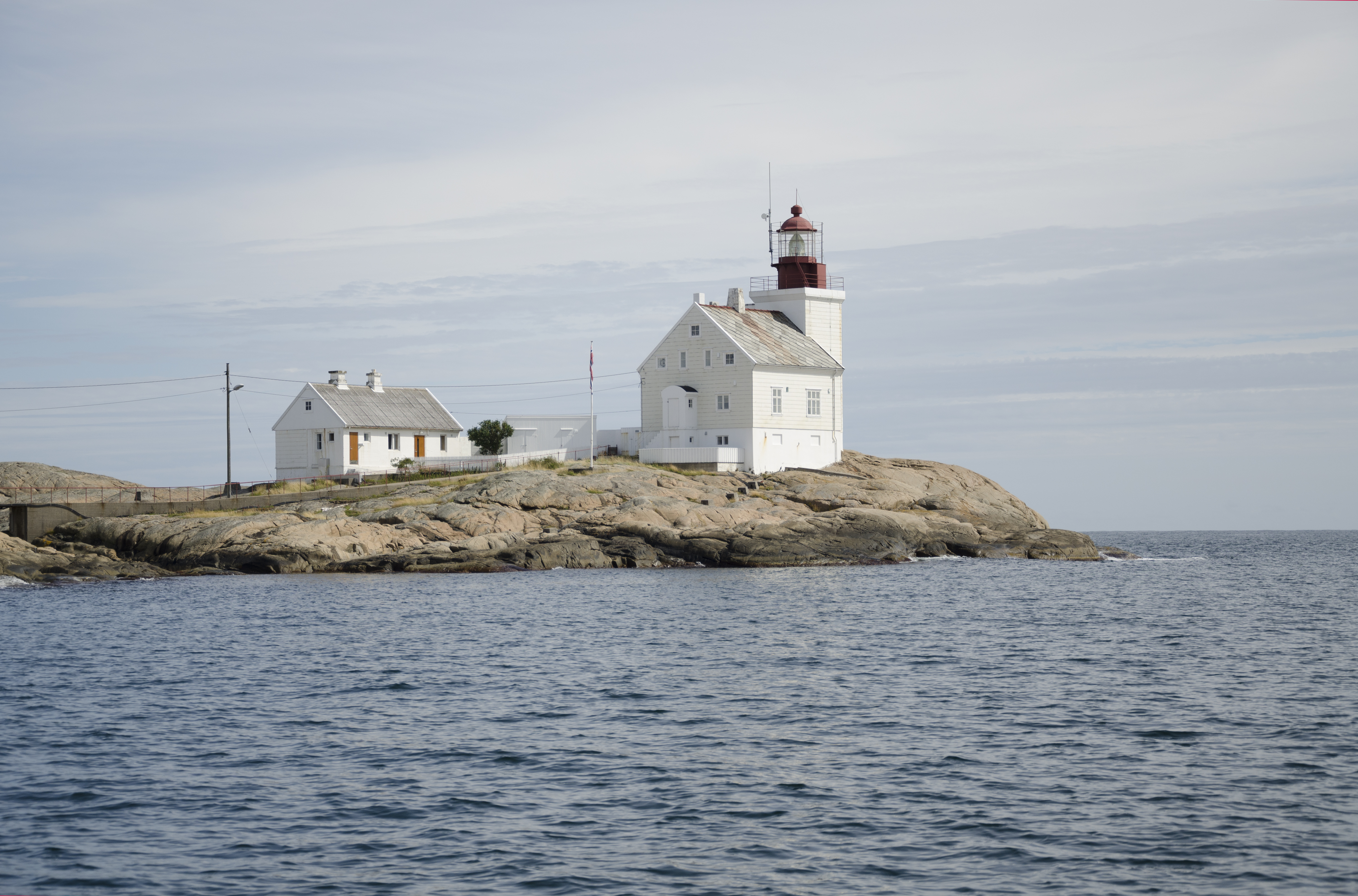

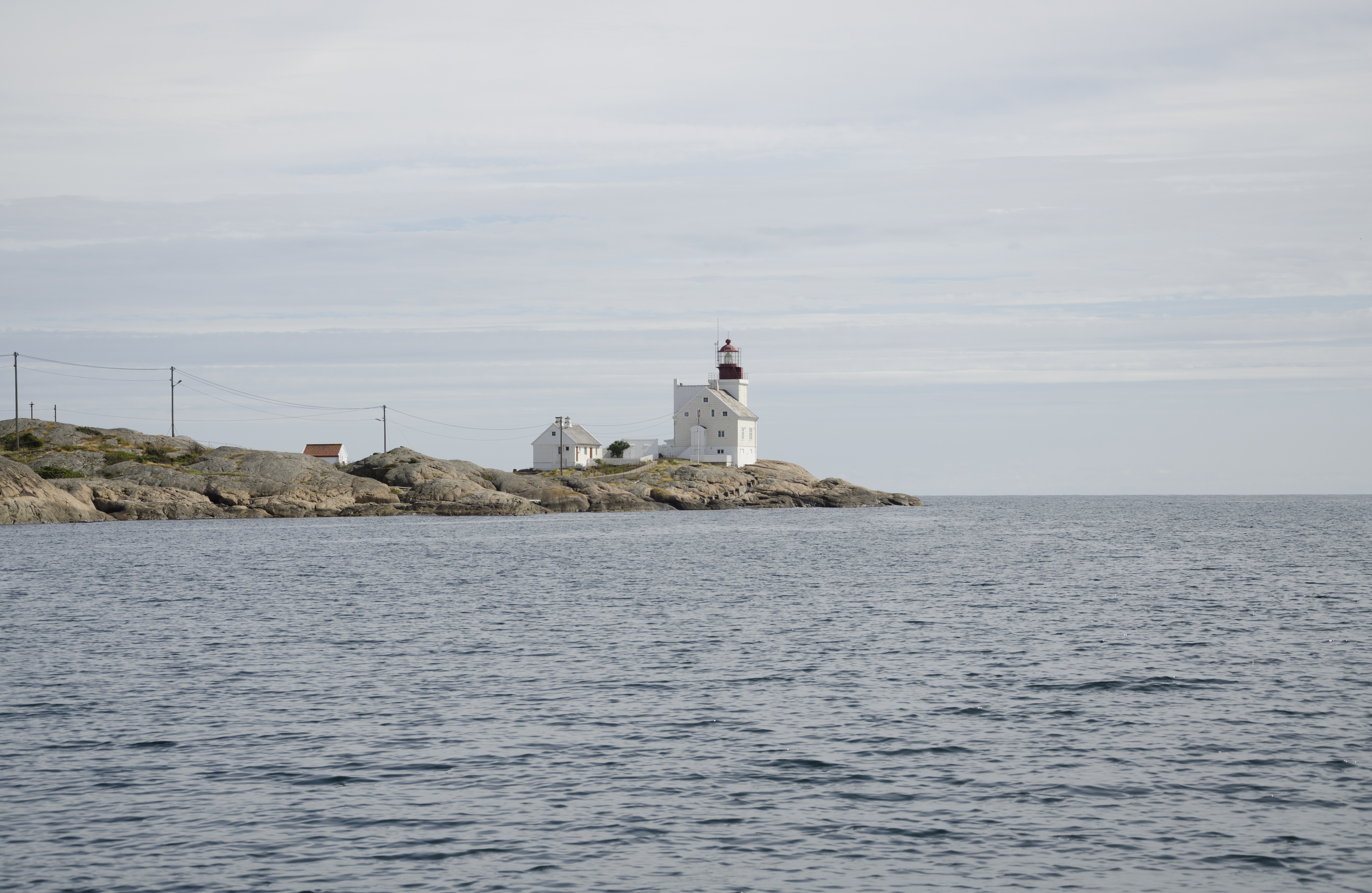

== Climate ==
Climate data for Lyngør Lighthouse 1991-2020 (4 m)
Month	Jan	Feb	Mar	Apr	May	Jun	Jul	Aug	Sep	Oct	Nov	Dec	Year
Mean daily maximum °C (°F)	3.4 (38.1)	3.1 (37.6)	5.5 (41.9)	9.1 (48.4)	13.9 (57.0)	17.7 (63.9)	20 (68)	19.6 (67.3)	16.1 (61.0)	11.2 (52.2)	7.1 (44.8)	4.2 (39.6)	10.9 (51.7)
Daily mean °C (°F)	1.2 (34.2)	0.7 (33.3)	2.6 (36.7)	6.1 (43.0)	10.8 (51.4)	14.7 (58.5)	17 (63)	16.8 (62.2)	13.5 (56.3)	8.9 (48.0)	5.1 (41.2)	2.1 (35.8)	8.3 (47.0)
Mean daily minimum °C (°F)	−0.7 (30.7)	−1.3 (29.7)	0.4 (32.7)	3.8 (38.8)	8.3 (46.9)	12.1 (53.8)	14.4 (57.9)	14.3 (57.7)	11.2 (52.2)	6.9 (44.4)	3.2 (37.8)	0.2 (32.4)	6.1 (42.9)
Average precipitation mm (inches)	86 (3.4)	61 (2.4)	59 (2.3)	52 (2.0)	67 (2.6)	67 (2.6)	81 (3.2)	108 (4.3)	102 (4.0)	130 (5.1)	114 (4.5)	91 (3.6)	1,018 (40)
Source 1: Yr (precipitation)
Source 2: NOAA - WMO averages 91-2020 Norway

== See also ==
- Lighthouses in Norway
- List of lighthouses in Norway
