= Theo Findahl =

Norwegian teacher, journalist and foreign correspondent

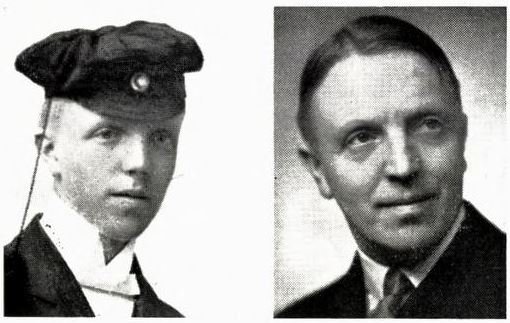
- Born: 24 August 1891; Tvedestrand, Norway
- Died: 19 May 1976 (aged 84)
- Occupations: Teacher; Journalist

Theo Findahl (24 August 1891 – 19 May 1976) was a Norwegian teacher, journalist and foreign correspondent.

Theodor Leonard Findahl was born in Tvedestrand in Nedenes, Norway. He was awarded a philological degree at the University of Oslo (1917). He worked as teacher until 1939, and from then as a foreign correspondent for the newspaper Aftenposten. He is particularly remembered for his reports from Germany on 5 and 7 April 1940, when he was a news correspondent in Berlin. These reports warned about the German attack on Norway, but the message was not taken seriously by the Norwegian Commanding Admiral.

After the war, he was a foreign correspondent for Aftenposten in London, New York City and finally in Rome. Among his books are Kloster og arena. Streiftog i Spanien from 1926, Den gule keiservei. Inntrykk fra Japan from 1933, Undergang. Berlin 1939–1945 from 1945, and Lange skygger. Dagbok fra krigens Berlin 1939–1945 from 1964.
