= Grønland, Agder =

Village in Tvedestrand Municipality, Norway

Grønland
- Village
- Interactive map of Grønland
- Coordinates: 58.6069°N 08.9559°E
- Country: Norway
- Region: Southern Norway
- County: Agder
- District: Østre Agder
- Municipality: Tvedestrand Municipality
- Elevation: 7 m (23 ft)
- Time zone: UTC+01:00 (CET)
  - Summer (DST): UTC+02:00 (CEST)
- Post Code: 4900 Tvedestrand

Grønland is a village in Tvedestrand Municipality in Agder county, Norway. The village is located along the Norwegian County Road 411 on the eastern shore of the Tvedestrandfjorden, about 4 kilometres (2.5 mi) southeast of the town of Tvedestrand and immediately west of the village of Sagesund.
