= Songe =

Village in Tvedestrand Municipality, Norway

- Village
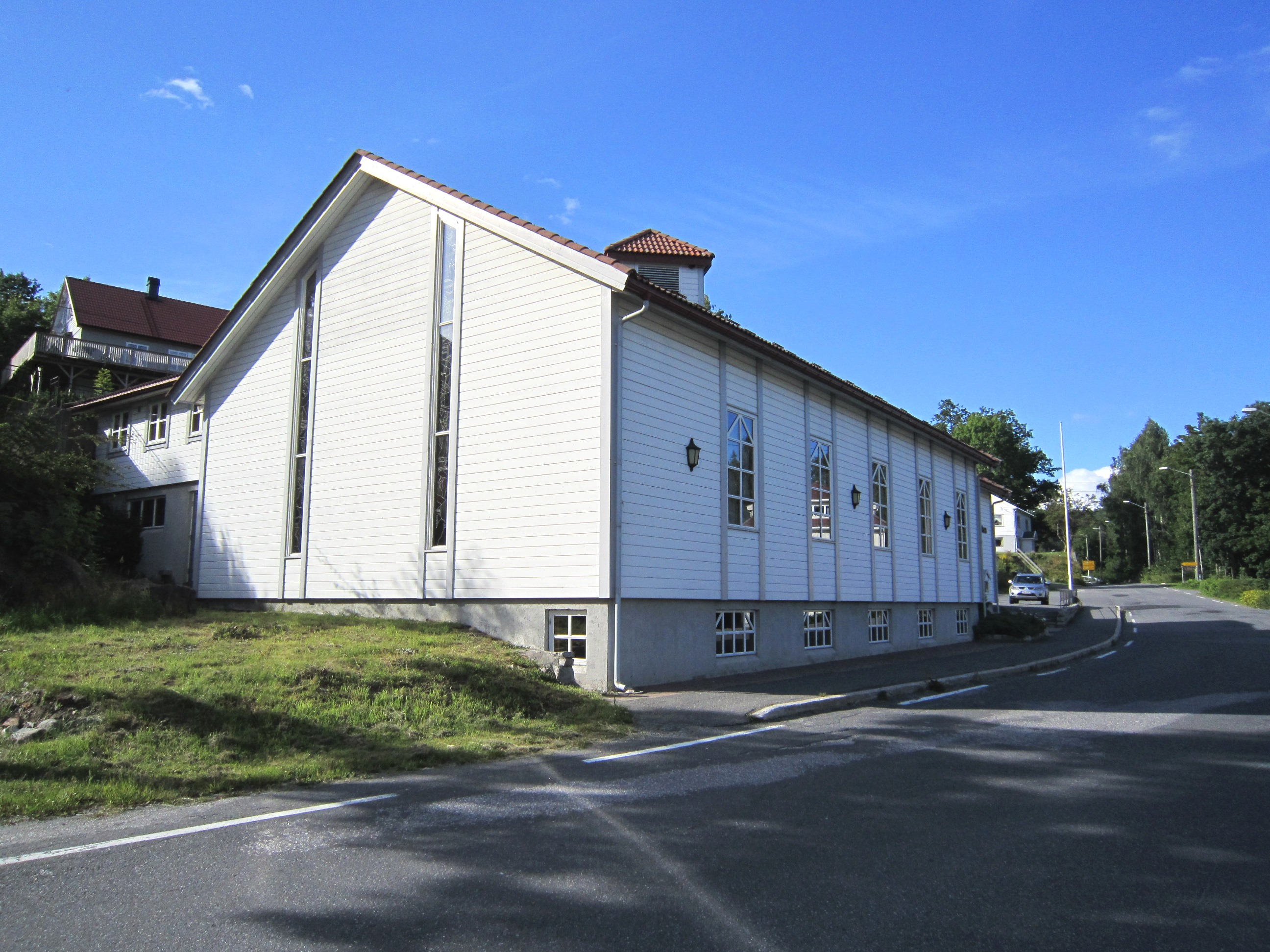
- View of the village Free Church
- Interactive map of Songe
- Coordinates: 58.6854°N 09.0044°E
- Country: Norway
- Region: Southern Norway
- County: Agder
- District: Østre Agder
- Municipality: Tvedestrand Municipality
- Elevation: 4 m (13 ft)
- Time zone: UTC+01:00 (CET)
  - Summer (DST): UTC+02:00 (CEST)
- Post Code: 4909 Songe

Songe is a village in Tvedestrand Municipality in Agder county, Norway. The village is located along the European route E18, about 10 kilometres (6.2 mi) northeast of the town of Tvedestrand and about 5 kilometres (3.1 mi) south of the village of Akland (in neighboring Risør Municipality).
