= Dypvåg Municipality =

Former municipality in Aust-Agder, Norway

Dypvåg Municipality Dypvåg herred
- Former municipality
- Dyvåg herred (historic name); Dyvaag herred (historic name); Dybvaag herred (historic name)
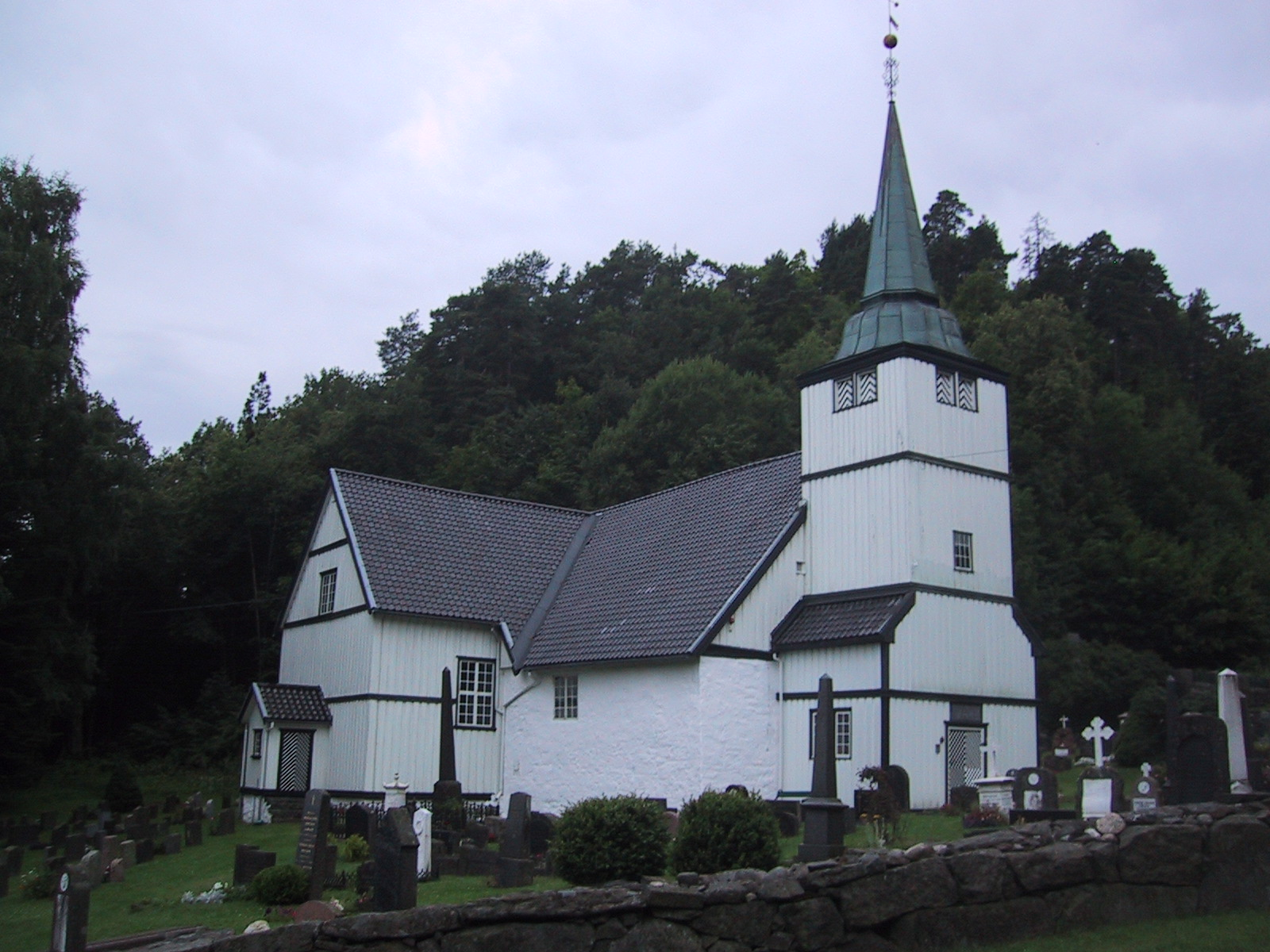
- View of the local church

- Aust-Agder within Norway

- Dypvåg within Aust-Agder
- Coordinates: 58°37′34″N 09°03′08″E
- Country: Norway
- County: Aust-Agder
- District: Østre Agder
- Established: 1 Jan 1838
  - Created as: Formannskapsdistrikt
- Disestablished: 1 Jan 1960
  - Succeeded by: Tvedestrand Municipality
- Administrative centre: Dypvåg

Government
  - Mayor (1948–1959): P. Lande (V)

Area (upon dissolution)
  - Total: 51.1 km^{2} (19.7 sq mi)
  - Rank: #624 in Norway
- Highest elevation: 144 m (472 ft)

Population (1959)
  - Total: 1,822
  - Rank: #493 in Norway
  - Density: 35.7/km^{2} (92/sq mi)
  - Change (10 years): ▼ −11%

Official language
  - Norwegian form: Bokmål
- Time zone: UTC+01:00 (CET)
  - Summer (DST): UTC+02:00 (CEST)
- ISO 3166 code: NO-0915

Dypvåg is a former municipality in the old Aust-Agder county, Norway. The 51.1-square-kilometre (19.7 sq mi) municipality existed from 1838 until its dissolution in 1960. The area is now part of Tvedestrand Municipality in the traditional district of Østre Agder in Agder county. The administrative centre was the village of Dypvåg where the Dypvåg Church is located.

Prior to its dissolution in 1960, the 51.1-square-kilometre (19.7 sq mi) municipality was the 624th largest by area out of the 743 municipalities in Norway. Dypvåg Municipality was the 493rd most populous municipality in Norway with a population of about 1,822. The municipality's population density was 35.7 inhabitants per square kilometre (92/sq mi) and its population had decreased by 11% over the previous 10-year period.

== General information ==
=== Administrative history ===
The parish of Dybvaag (later spelled "Dypvåg") was established as a municipality on 1 January 1838 (see formannskapsdistrikt law). On 1 January 1881, a small part of Holt Municipality (population: 52) was transferred to Dybvaag Municipality. Then, on 1 January 1887, a small uninhabited part of neighboring Søndeled Municipality was transferred to Dybvaag Municipality.

On 1 January 1902, Dybvaag Municipality was divided as follows: the southwestern district (population: 1,892) became the new Flosta Municipality and the northeastern district (population: 3,235) continued as a smaller Dybvaag Municipality.

During the 1960s, there were many municipal mergers across Norway due to the work of the Schei Committee. On 1 January 1960, Dypvåg Municipality was dissolved and the following areas were merged to form an enlarged Tvedestrand Municipality:

- all of Dypvåg Municipality (population: 1,805)
- all of Holt Municipality (population: 3,759)
- all of Tvedestrand Municipality (population: 868)

=== Name ===
The municipality (originally the parish) is named after the old Dybvaag farm (Old Norse: Djúpvágr or Djúpivágr) since the first Dypvåg Church was built there. The first element comes from the word djúpr which means "deep". The last element is vágr which means "inlet" or "bay".

Historically, the name of the municipality was spelled Dybvaag. On 3 November 1917, a royal resolution changed the spelling of the name of the municipality to Dyvaag. On 21 December 1917, a royal resolution enacted the 1917 Norwegian language reforms. Prior to this change, the name was spelled Dyvaag with the digraph "aa", and after this reform, the name was spelled Dyvåg, using the letter å instead. On 22 January 1932, a royal resolution changed the spelling of the name of the municipality to Dypvåg.

=== Churches ===
The Church of Norway had one parish (sokn) within Dypvåg Municipality. At the time of the municipal dissolution, it was part of the Dypvåg prestegjeld and the Aust-Nedenes prosti (deanery) in the Diocese of Agder.

Churches in Dypvåg Municipality
Parish (sokn)	Church name	Location of the church	Year built
Dypvåg	Dypvåg Church	Dypvåg	c. 1200

== Geography ==
The small municipality included the coastal area about 8 kilometres (5.0 mi) east of the town of Tvedestrand and several islands located just offshore. The highest point in the municipality was the 144-metre (472 ft) tall mountain Nordre Svartvannsåsen. Holt Municipality was located to the west and north, Søndeled Municipality was located to the northeast, the Skagerrak sea was located to the east and south, Flosta Municipality was located to the southwest, and Tvedestrand Municipality was located to the west.

== Government ==
While it existed, Dypvåg Municipality was responsible for primary education (through 10th grade), outpatient health services, senior citizen services, welfare and other social services, zoning, economic development, and municipal roads and utilities. The municipality was governed by a municipal council of directly elected representatives. The mayor was indirectly elected by a vote of the municipal council. The municipality was under the jurisdiction of the Holt District Court and the Agder Court of Appeal.

=== Municipal council ===
The municipal council (Herredsstyre) of Dypvåg Municipality was made up of 21 representatives that were elected to four year terms. The tables below show the historical composition of the council by political party.

Dypvåg herredsstyre 1955–1959
Party name (in Norwegian)	Number of representatives
Labour Party (Arbeiderpartiet)	6
Conservative Party (Høyre)	7
Liberal Party (Venstre)	8
Total number of members:	21
Note: On 1 January 1960, Dypvåg Municipality became part of Tvedestrand Municipality.

Dypvåg herredsstyre 1951–1955
Party name (in Norwegian)	Number of representatives
Labour Party (Arbeiderpartiet)	5
Conservative Party (Høyre)	6
Liberal Party (Venstre)	9
Total number of members:	20

Dypvåg herredsstyre 1947–1951
Party name (in Norwegian)	Number of representatives
Labour Party (Arbeiderpartiet)	5
Conservative Party (Høyre)	7
Joint list of the Liberal Party (Venstre) and the Radical People's Party (Radikale Folkepartiet)	8
Total number of members:	20

Dypvåg herredsstyre 1945–1947
Party name (in Norwegian)	Number of representatives
Labour Party (Arbeiderpartiet)	6
Conservative Party (Høyre)	7
Joint list of the Liberal Party (Venstre) and the Radical People's Party (Radikale Folkepartiet)	7
Total number of members:	20

Dypvåg herredsstyre 1937–1941*
Party name (in Norwegian)	Number of representatives
Labour Party (Arbeiderpartiet)	2
Conservative Party (Høyre)	9
Joint List(s) of Non-Socialist Parties (Borgerlige Felleslister)	2
Local List(s) (Lokale lister)	8
Total number of members:	20
Note: Due to the German occupation of Norway during World War II, no elections were held for new municipal councils until after the war ended in 1945.

=== Mayors ===
The mayor (Norwegian: ordfører) of Dypvåg Municipality was the political leader of the municipality and the chairperson of the municipal council. The following people have held this position:

- 1838–1840: Rev. Ole Hersted Schjøtt
- 1840–1841: Anders Larsen Eidbu
- 1842–1853: Rev. Christian Andreas Münster
- 1853–1855: G. Jensen Eidbu
- 1855–1857: Ellev Knudsen Askerøya
- 1858–1861: Ole Albretsen Tangvall
- 1862–1863: J.C. Christophersen Lyngør
- 1863–1867: P.E. Olsen Borøya
- 1868–1873: Christian Olsen Borøya
- 1874–1877: Knud J. Nilsen
- 1878–1879: Ole Edvard Ellingsen
- 1880–1885: Andreas Emil Olsen
- 1886–1898: Jens Martin Marcussen (H)
- 1899–1904: K. Jensen
- 1905–1910: Haakon Thorvald Hansen (H)
- 1911–1925: Jens Marcussen (V)
- 1926–1928: M. Hareide
- 1928–1929: Yngve Sørensen
- 1930–1937: Emanuel M. Christophersen
- 1938–1940: Halvor Halvorsen
- 1941–1942: Peder Danielsen (NS)
- 1942–1943: Bjarne Jacobsen Staubo (NS)
- 1945–1945: Halvor Halvorsen
- 1946–1947: Gottfred Henriksen
- 1948–1959: P. Lande (V)

== Notable people ==
- Jens Marcussen (1926-2007), a politician
- Kristian Vilhelm Koren Schjelderup, Jr. (1894-1980), a theologian
- Peter Olrog Schjøtt (1833-1926), a philologist

== See also ==
- List of former municipalities of Norway
