= Fiane, Tvedestrand =

Village in Tvedestrand Municipality, Norway

Fiane
- Village
- Interactive map of Fiane
- Coordinates: 58.6191°N 08.8786°E
- Country: Norway
- Region: Southern Norway
- County: Agder
- District: Østre Agder
- Municipality: Tvedestrand Municipality
- Elevation: 40 m (130 ft)
- Time zone: UTC+01:00 (CET)
  - Summer (DST): UTC+02:00 (CEST)
- Post Code: 4900 Tvedestrand

Fiane is a village in Tvedestrand Municipality in Agder county, Norway. The village is located at the intersection of the European route E18 highway and the Norwegian County Road 415. Fiane is about 4 kilometres (2.5 mi) west of the town of Tvedestrand and about 2.5 kilometres (1.6 mi) southeast of the village of Nesgrenda. The historic Holt Church lies just south of Fiane.

== History ==
This village was the administrative centre of the old Holt Municipality which existed from 1838 until 1960.
