= Sagesund =

Village in Tvedestrand Municipality, Norway

- Village
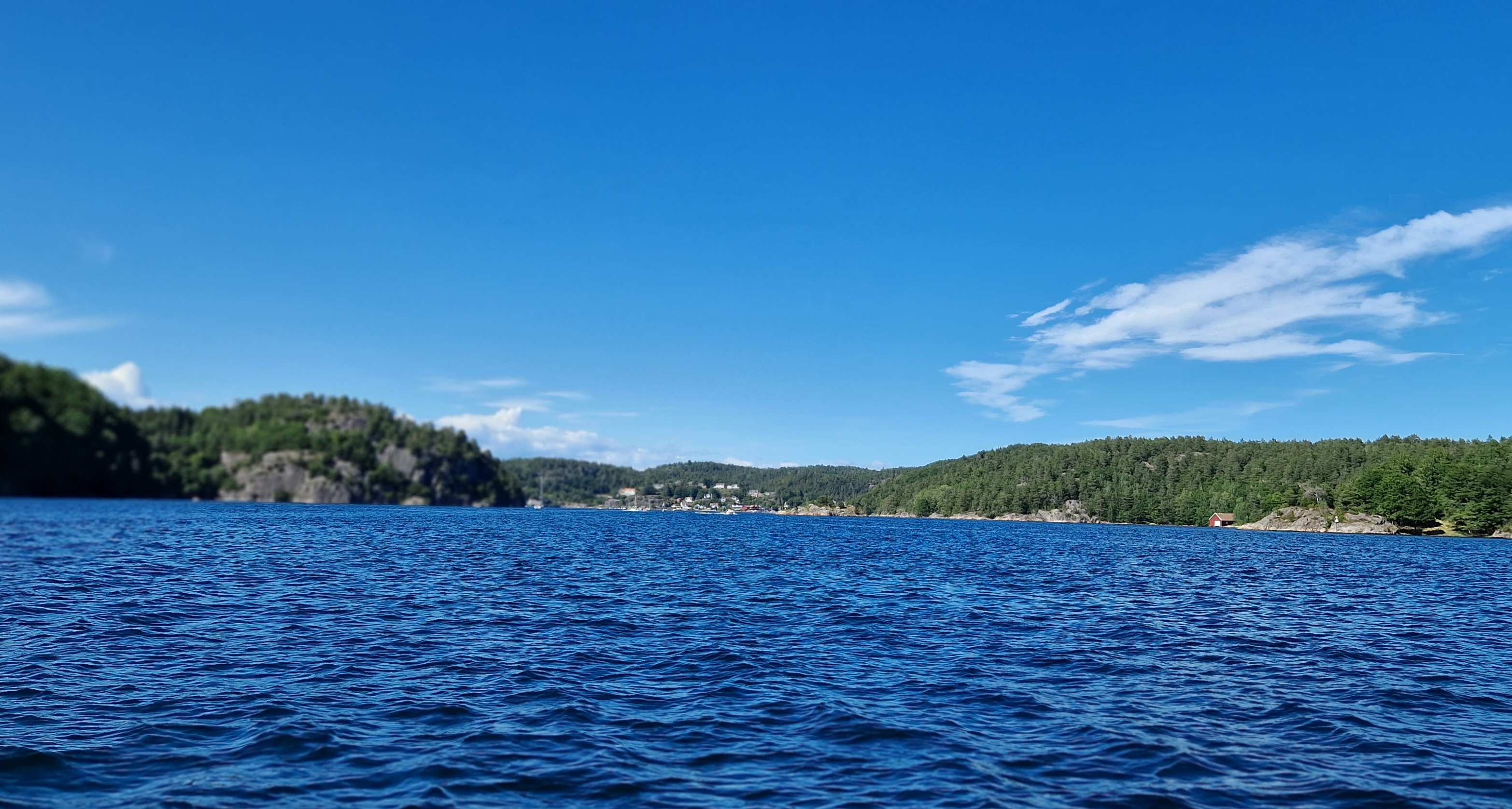
- View of the village in the distance
- Interactive map of Sagesund
- Coordinates: 58.6054°N 08.9724°E
- Country: Norway
- Region: Southern Norway
- County: Agder
- District: Østre Agder
- Municipality: Tvedestrand Municipality
- Elevation: 2 m (6.6 ft)
- Time zone: UTC+01:00 (CET)
  - Summer (DST): UTC+02:00 (CEST)
- Post Code: 4900 Tvedestrand

Sagesund is a small village in Tvedestrand Municipality in Agder county, Norway. It is located on the shore of the Oksefjorden and along the Norwegian County Road 411. Sagesund is located about 6.2 kilometres (3.9 mi) southeast of the town of Tvedestrand and about 4 kilometres (2.5 mi) west of the villages of Dypvåg and Krokvåg. There is also bus service from the town of Tvedestrand.

Approximately 50 people live there on a permanent basis. It is popular in the summer, when the population at least doubles. It has a sports arena with tennis courts, and a beach volleyball field. The fjord is also an excellent place for waterskiing and wakeboarding, but also for more quiet activities.

== History ==
Sagesund got its name from a sash saw mill, located in a creek. The lumbermill was used by local farmers. In the 19th century there were three shipyards here, building sailing ships, brigs, barques, schooners, etc. There used to be a large ice storage building. It was used to hold ice that was to be exported. In the 1950s, there were three stores, a post office, a galvanic workshop, an assembly house, and an electric sawmill.

The sailboat Origo started and ended its circumnavigation of the world from Sagesund in 1994. Nor Siglar, with half the crew from Sagesund, also included Sagesund as a natural stop on its way around the globe.
