= Holt Church =

Church in Agder, Norway

- Holt kirke
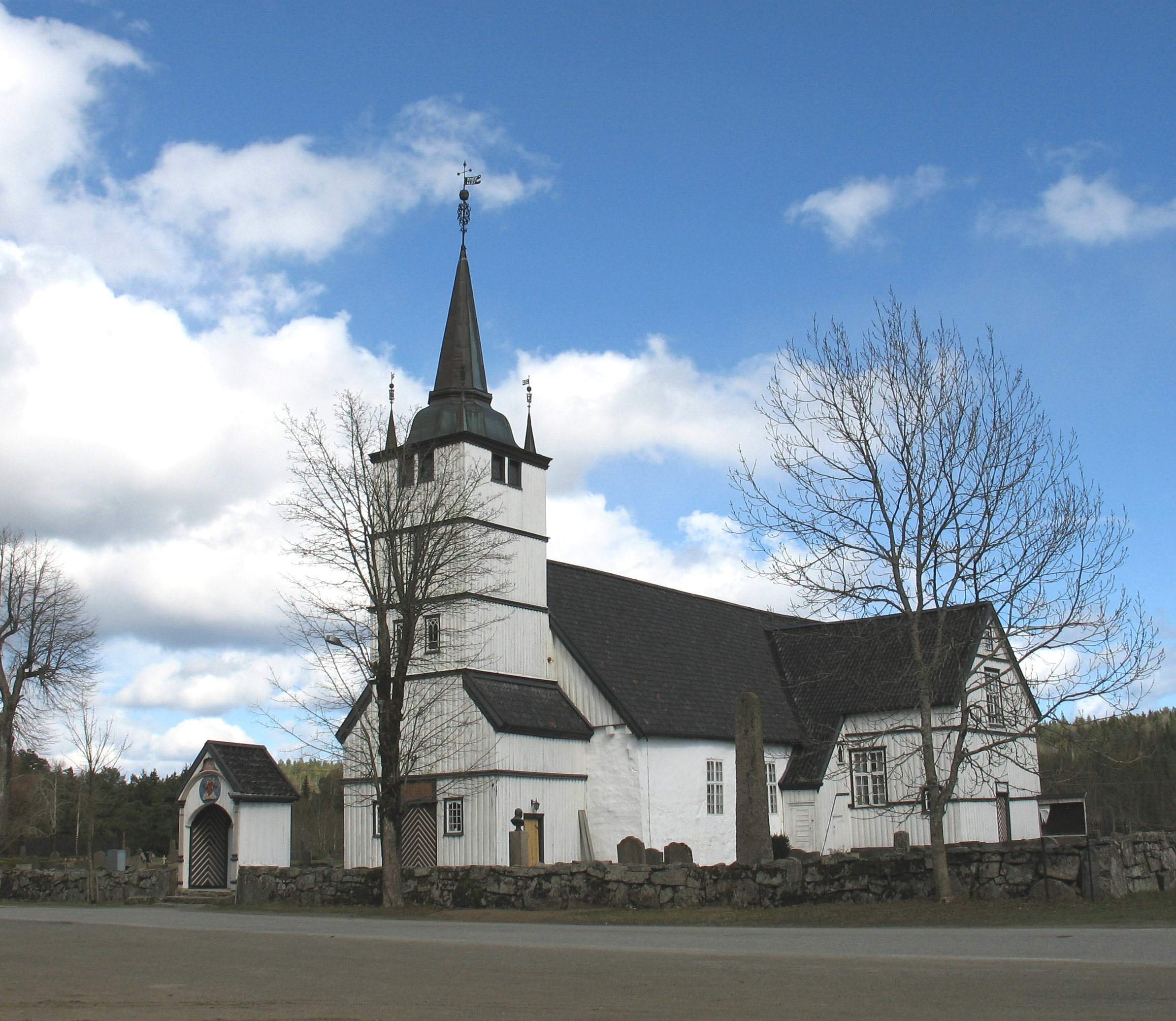
- View of the church
- Holt Church
- 58.606921°N 08.870548°E
- Location: Tvedestrand Municipality, Agder
- Country: Norway
- Denomination: Church of Norway
- Previous denomination: Catholic Church
- Churchmanship: Evangelical Lutheran

History
- Status: Parish church
- Founded: c. 1100
- Consecrated: c. 1100

Architecture
- Functional status: Active
- Architectural type: Cruciform
- Completed: c. 1100 (926 years ago)

Specifications
- Capacity: 430
- Materials: Stone and wood

Administration
- Diocese: Agder og Telemark
- Deanery: Aust-Nedenes prosti
- Parish: Holt
- Norwegian Cultural Heritage Site
- Type: Church
- Status: Automatically protected
- ID: 84613

Holt Church (Norwegian: Holt kirke) is a parish church of the Church of Norway in Tvedestrand Municipality in Agder county, Norway. It is located just south of the village of Fiane. It is one of the churches for the Holt parish which is part of the Aust-Nedenes prosti (deanery) in the Diocese of Agder og Telemark. The white, stone and wood church was originally built in a long church design around the year 1100 using plans drawn up by an unknown architect (later it was converted into a cruciform design). The church seats about 430 people.

== History ==
The earliest existing historical records of the church date back to the year 1374, but the church was likely built around 1100. The Romanesque stone building was originally built as a rectangular nave with a narrower, rectangular choir. In 1753, the old choir was torn down and two new timber-framed wings were added, along with a new choir, giving the building a cruciform design. The architect Lars Albretsen Øvernes led this renovation.

In 1814, this church served as an election church (Norwegian: valgkirke). Together with more than 300 other parish churches across Norway, it was a polling station for elections to the 1814 Norwegian Constituent Assembly which wrote the Constitution of Norway. This was Norway's first national elections. Each church parish was a constituency that elected people called "electors" who later met together in each county to elect the representatives for the assembly that was to meet at Eidsvoll Manor later that year.

== Media gallery ==
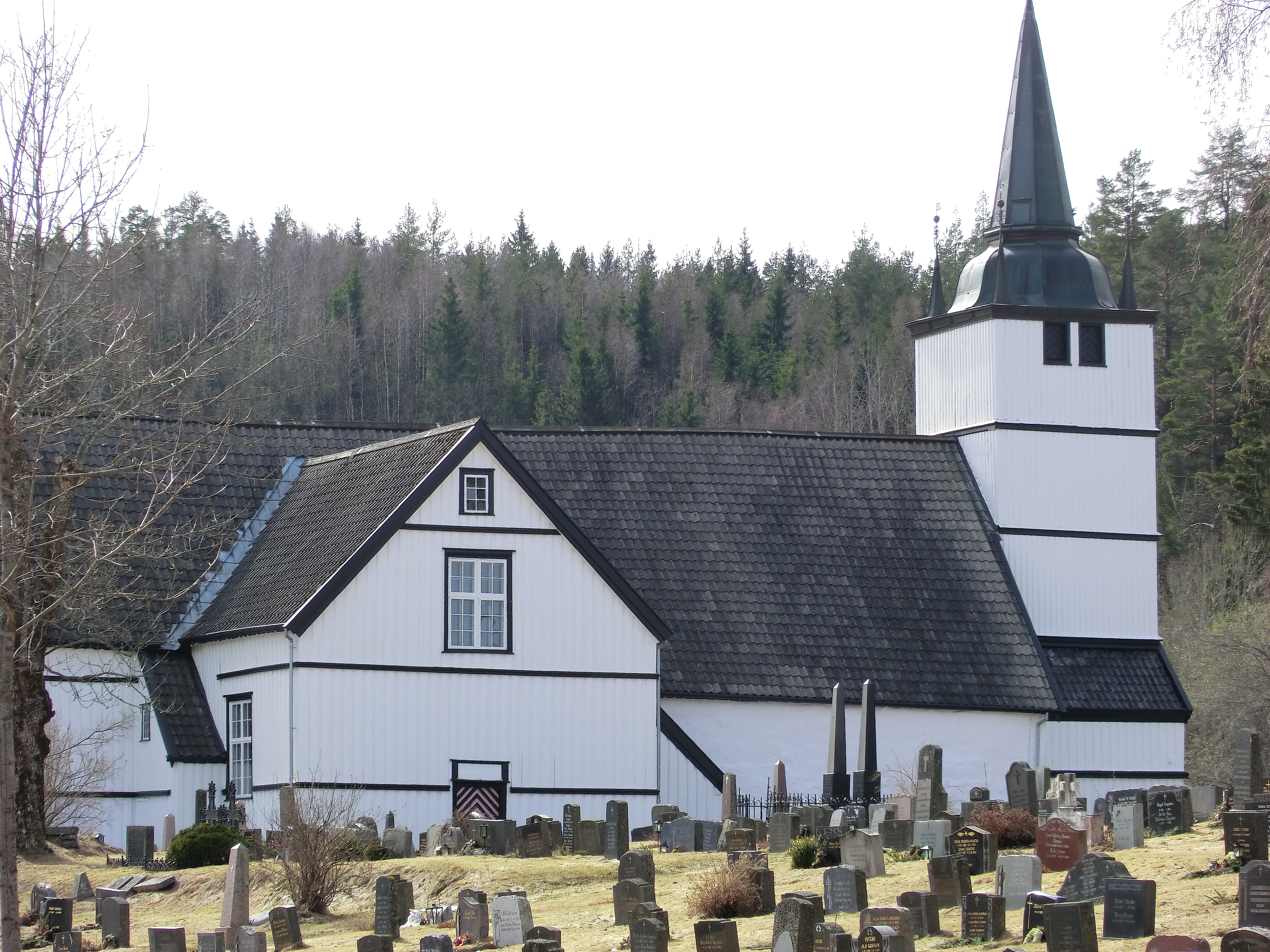

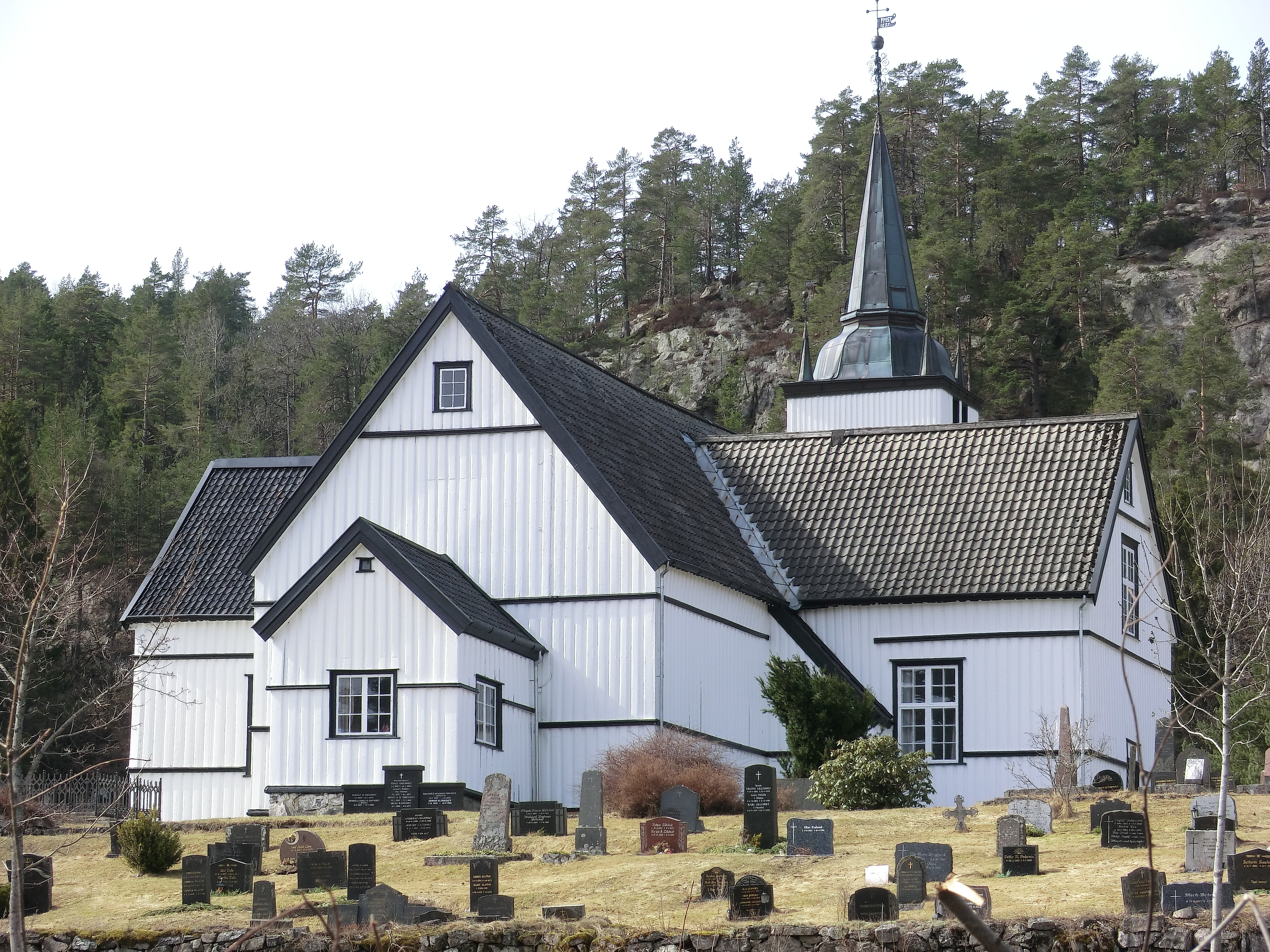

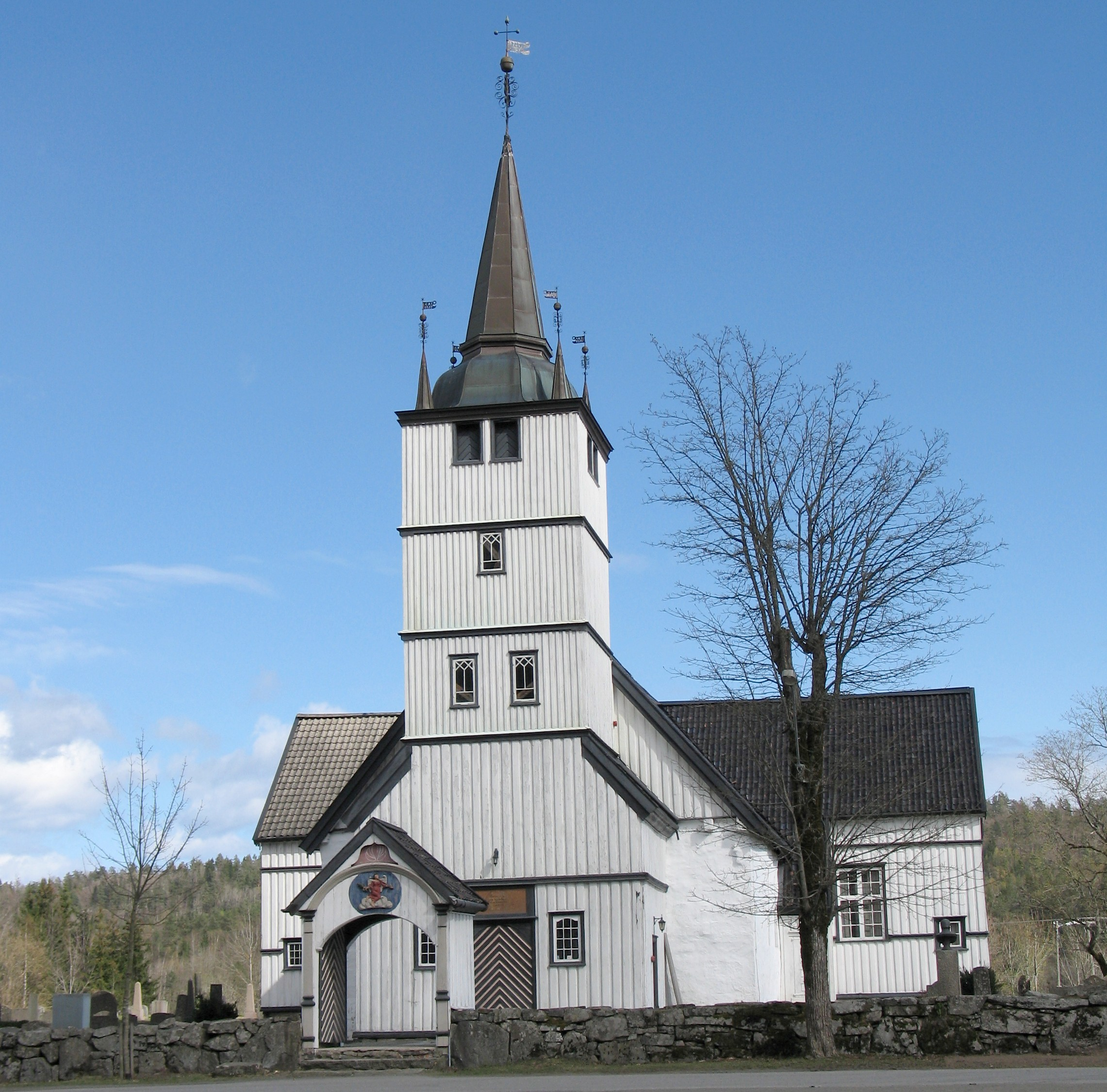

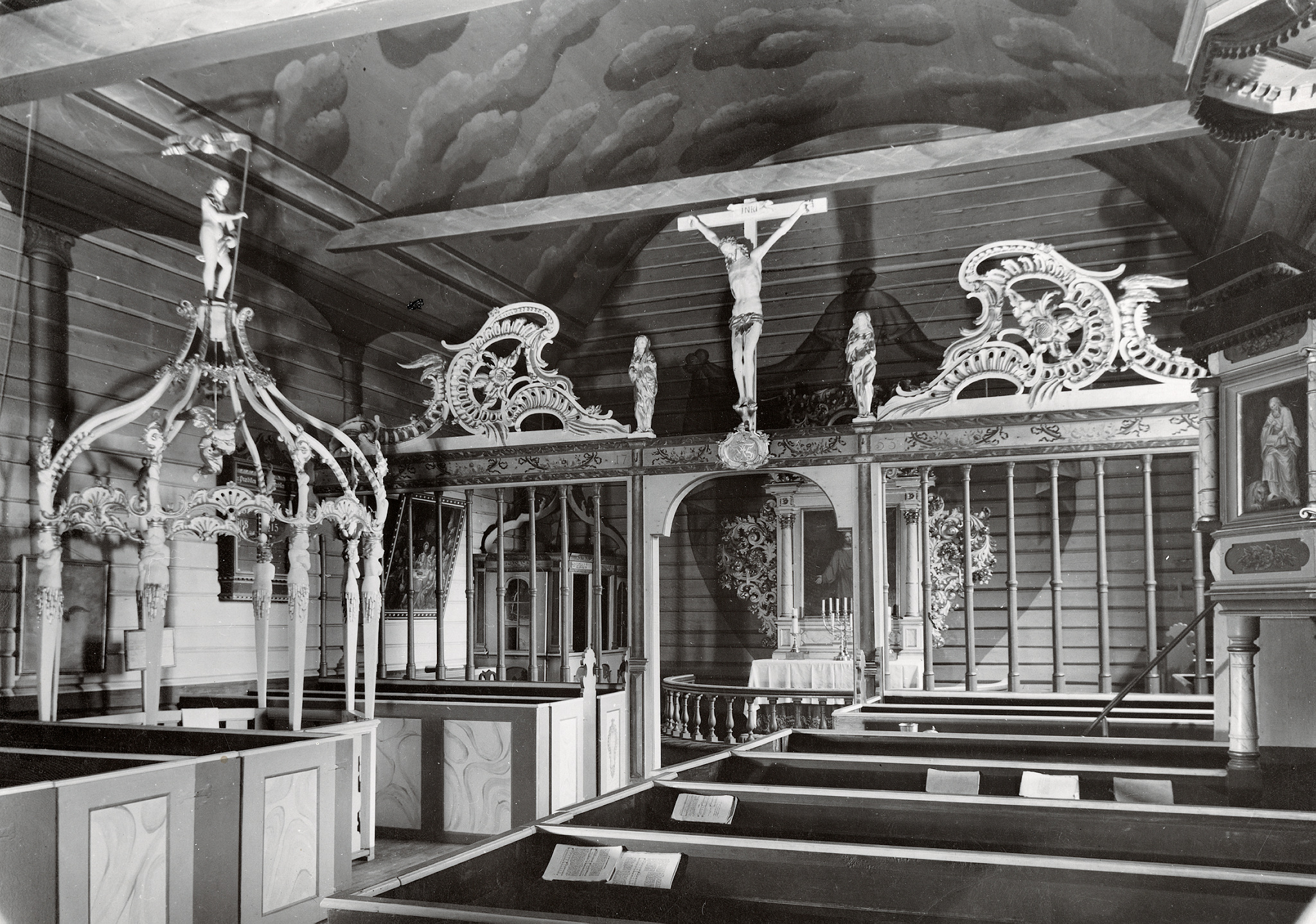

== See also ==
- List of churches in Agder og Telemark
