= Sandøya, Agder =

Island in Agder, Norway

Sandøya
- Interactive map of the island

Geography
- Location: Agder, Norway
- Coordinates: 58.5917°N 09.0477°E
- Area: 3.8 km^{2} (1.5 sq mi)

Administration
- Norway
- County: Agder
- Municipality: Tvedestrand Municipality

Demographics
- Population: 194 (2017)

Sandøya (lit. 'Sand island') is an island in Tvedestrand Municipality in Agder county, Norway. The 3.8-square-kilometre (1.5 sq mi) island is located along the southern Skagerrak coast and it has roughly 200 permanent residents (2017). The island has no bridge to the mainland, and the inhabitants rely on boats for transportation. Cars are parked at the nearby island Borøya. There are only four cars on the island, which are seldom in use. Being close to the popular tourist attraction Lyngør (a nearby group of islands frequented by thousands of tourists every summer), Sandøya is a popular summer vacation spot. The population rises to several thousand in the summer.

== Climate ==
The climate is mild, with mostly snow-free winters, and warm summers. The island probably gained its name because the soil consists mostly of sand. To maintain a garden, it is in many places necessary to enrich the soil with seaweed.

Though the island is in no way self-sufficient, with most of the adult residents working on the mainland, it manages to maintain a strong community, with a school, a kindergarten, a movie theater, a choir, a local store, a boat building workshop, and an architect's office. Several graphic artists also work on the island. The school teaches students from age six to age ten, after that, the children are sent to the mainland for further education.

== History ==
The history of the island is similar to many other communities along the southern coast of Norway. Sandøya saw its prime during the 19th century, all the way to the late 1940s. In this period, trading and seamanship dominated this part of Norway, and most adult men sought work on the sea. There was a certain class distinction between the different parts of the small island. The east part, called "østergården", was dominated by the common sailors and fishermen, while the western part, "vestergården", was dominated by the wealthy shipowners. Supposedly several of the old sailors, despite having traveled around the world several times, had never been to the other side of the island. All the traveling had an effect on the local dialect (which is, sadly, dying out); the language was assimilated with English terms picked up by the sailors. Words such as "roofet" (for roof instead of in Norwegian; "taket"), "spoona" (for spoon, instead in Norwegian; "skjeia"), and so on.

In its prime (around 1900), inhabitants of Sandøya numbered between 600 and 700, and the school had more than 100 students. The school is still active, but seldom with more than fifteen students. There was a dock with an advanced system for packaging and freezing fish, and several quartz mines. Along with hundreds of thousands of Norwegians, many inhabitants of Sandøya emigrated from Norway to the United States in the late 19th and early 20th centuries.

Sandøya experienced a sharp decline in population during the first half of the 20th century, as sailing was replaced with steam-powered boats. In the early 1970s, the population reached an all-time low, and the school survived a year or two with only two pupils. However, several families found the car-free and safe island a good place to raise children. The population steadily increased, the number of school children increased, and a new grocery store opened. The store is currently (fall 2006) expanding.

== Preserving the community ==
One factor which has helped to increase the population is district-friendly legislation executed by Tvedestrand Municipality called "boplikt". The law forbids sale of houses to buyers who do not live on Sandøya year-round. The result is that the houses on the island are artificially low priced. The law is debated, and there have been several efforts to change it, but it is still in effect.
