= Dypvåg (village) =

Village in Tvedestrand Municipality, Norway

- Village
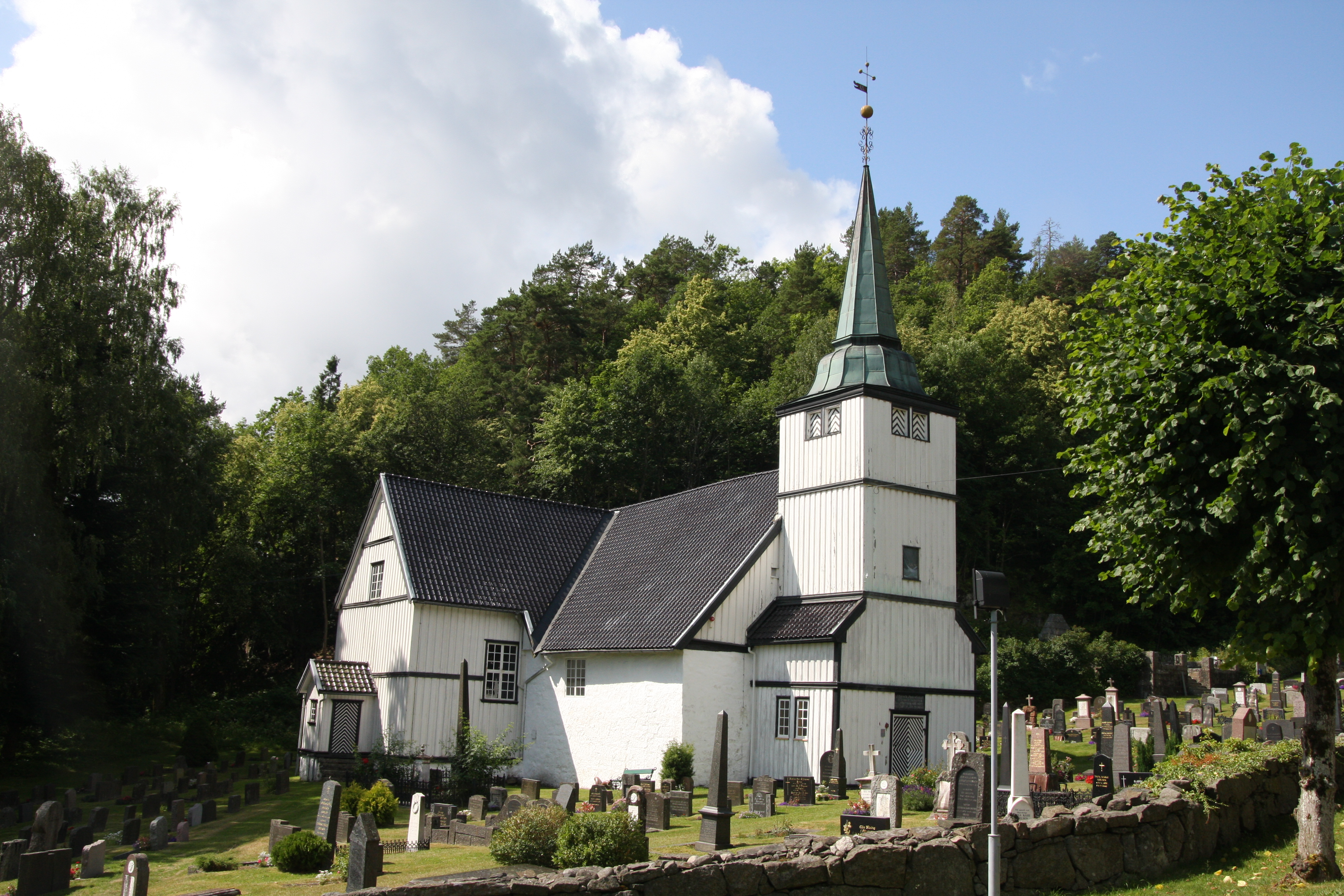
- View of the village church
- Interactive map of Dypvåg
- Coordinates: 58.6263°N 09.0523°E
- Country: Norway
- Region: Southern Norway
- County: Agder
- District: Østre Agder
- Municipality: Tvedestrand Municipality
- Elevation: 35 m (115 ft)
- Time zone: UTC+01:00 (CET)
  - Summer (DST): UTC+02:00 (CEST)
- Post Code: 4900 Tvedestrand

Dypvåg is a village in Tvedestrand Municipality in Agder county, Norway. The village is located along the Skagerrak coast and the Norwegian County Road 411, about 10 kilometres (6.2 mi) east of the town of Tvedestrand and the village of Krokvåg lies immediately west of Dypvåg.

== History ==
The village was the administrative centre of the old Dypvåg Municipality which existed from 1838 until its dissolution in 1960. The historic Dypvåg Church is also located in the village.

=== Name ===
The village is named after the old Dybvaag farm (Old Norse: Djúpvágr or Djúpivágr), since the first Dypvåg Church was built there. The first element comes from dype which means "deep" and the last element is våg which means "water" or "harbor". The spelling was changed from Dybvaag to Dypvåg around the early 20th century.

== Notable people ==
- Jens Marcussen (1926–2007), a politician
- Kristian Vilhelm Koren Schjelderup, Jr. (1894–1980), a theologian
- Peter Olrog Schjøtt (1833–1926), a philologist
