= Moland Municipality =

Former municipality in Aust-Agder, Norway

Moland Municipality Moland kommune
- Former municipality
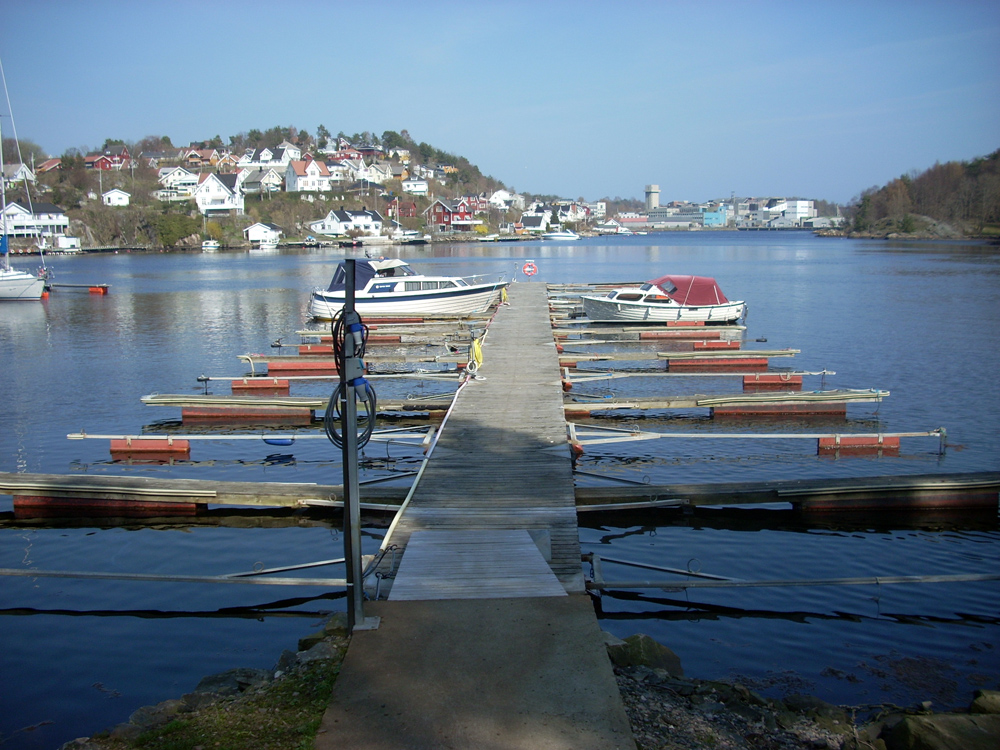
- View of Eydehavn harbour

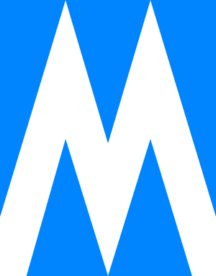
- Flag Coat of arms

- Aust-Agder within Norway

- Moland within Aust-Agder
- Coordinates: 58°32′52″N 08°48′40″E
- Country: Norway
- County: Aust-Agder
- District: Østre Agder
- Established: 1 January 1962
  - Preceded by: Tvedestrand, Stokken, Austre Moland, and Flosta municipalities
- Disestablished: 1 January 1992
  - Succeeded by: Arendal Municipality
- Administrative centre: Eydehavn

Government
  - Mayor (1989–1992): Sigurd Ledaal (H)

Area
  - Total: 127.1 km^{2} (49.1 sq mi)
  - Rank: #370 in Norway
- Highest elevation: 225 m (738 ft)

Population (1991)
  - Total: 8,148
  - Rank: #124 in Norway
  - Density: 64.1/km^{2} (166/sq mi)
  - Change (10 years): ▲ +10.3%
- Demonym: Molending

Official language
  - Norwegian form: Bokmål
- Time zone: UTC+01:00 (CET)
  - Summer (DST): UTC+02:00 (CEST)
- ISO 3166 code: NO-0918

Moland is a former municipality in the old Aust-Agder county, Norway. The 127.1-square-kilometre (49.1 sq mi) municipality existed from 1962 until its dissolution in 1992. The area is now part of Arendal Municipality in the traditional district of Østre Agder in Agder county. The administrative centre was the village of Eydehavn. Other villages in the municipality included Kilsund, Narestø, Saltrød, Brekka, Strengereid, Vatnebu, and Sagene.

Prior to its dissolution in 1992, the 127.1-square-kilometre (49.1 sq mi) municipality was the 370th largest by area out of the 448 municipalities in Norway. Moland Municipality was the 124th most populous municipality in Norway with a population of about 8,148. The municipality's population density was 64.1 inhabitants per square kilometre (166/sq mi) and its population had increased by 10.3% over the previous 10-year period.

== General information ==
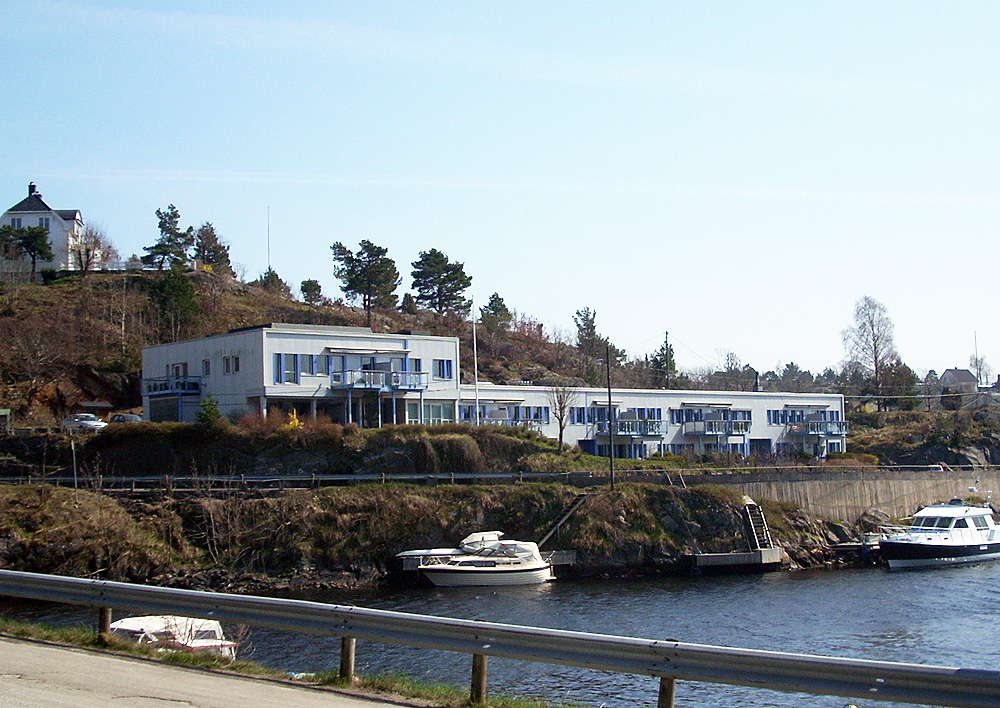
View of the old Moland municipal government building in Eydehavn

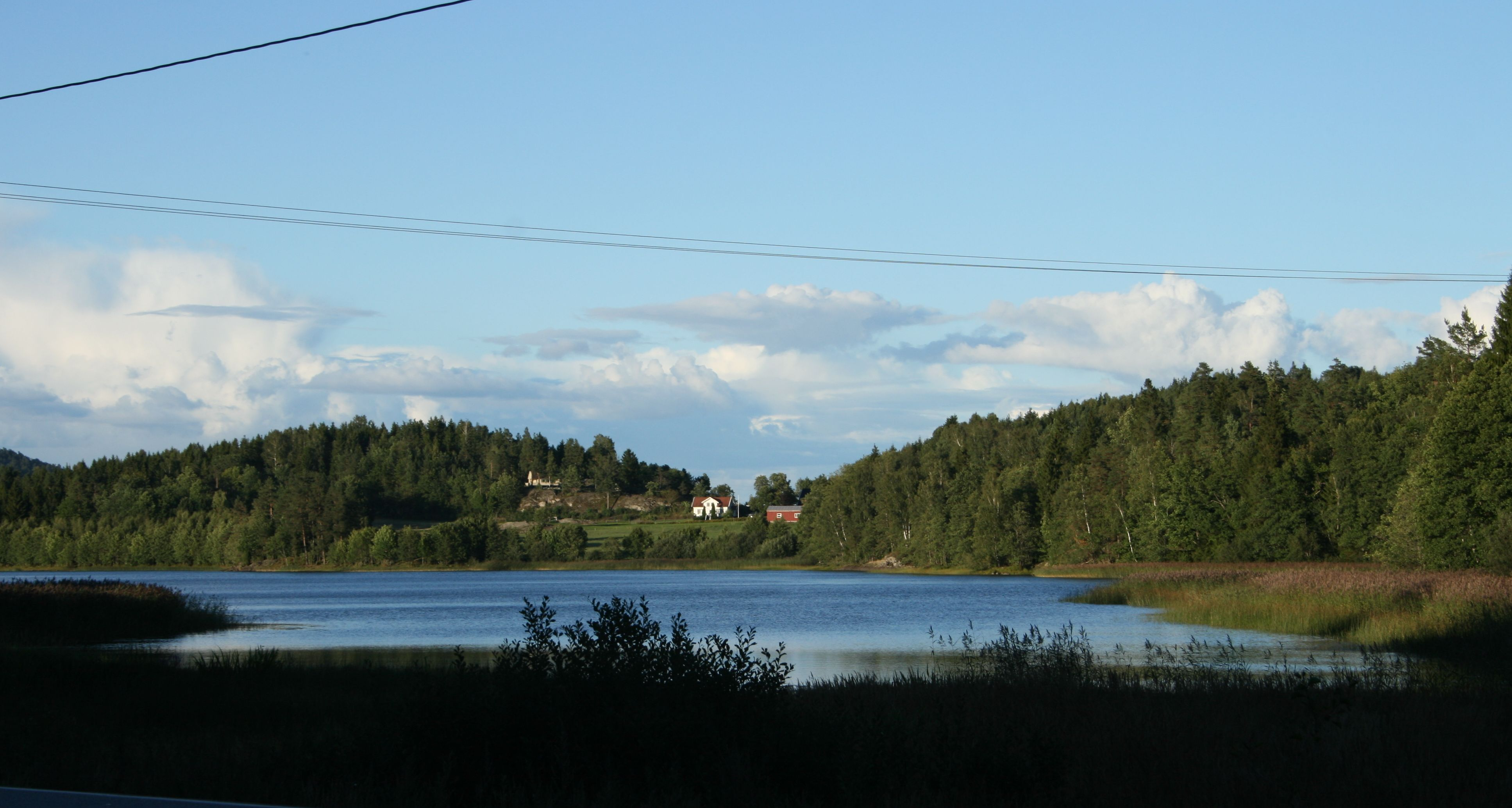
View of the lake Molandsvann.

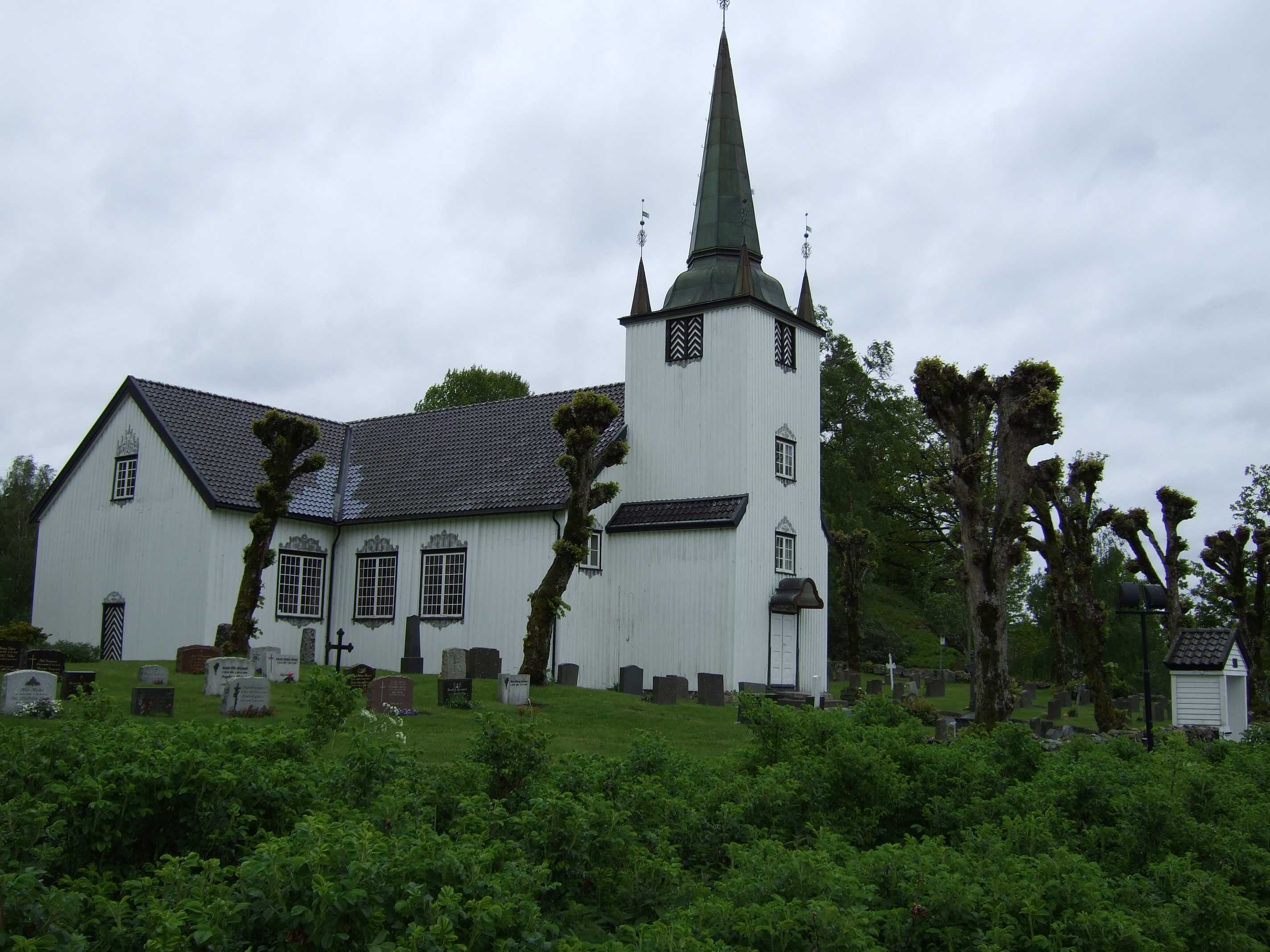
Austre Moland Church

During the 1960s, there were many municipal mergers across Norway due to the work of the Schei Committee. On 1 January 1962, the following areas were merged to form the new Moland Municipality:

- all of Austre Moland Municipality (population: 1,607)
- all of Flosta Municipality (population: 1,205)
- all of Stokken Municipality (population: 2,783)
- the Strengereid area of Tvedestrand Municipality (population: 375)

On 1 January 1992, Moland Municipality was dissolved and the following areas were merged to form an enlarged Arendal Municipality:

- all of Moland Municipality (population: 8,148)
- all of Arendal Municipality (population: 12,478)
- all of Hisøy Municipality (population: 4,026)
- all of Tromøy Municipality (population: 4,711)
- all of Øyestad Municipality (population: 8,679)

=== Name ===
The municipality (originally the parish) is named after the old Moland farm (Old Norse: Móðguland). The first element of the name is derived from the river Móðga. The river name comes from the Old Norse word móðigr which means "brave" or "courageous". The last element is land which means "land" or "district". Its predecessor Austre Moland Municipality had the prefix austre (which means "eastern") which was added to differentiate the place from Vestre Moland Municipality which was located a little further south along the coast of Norway, but since that municipality was dissolved, the prefix here was no longer needed.

=== Coat of arms ===
The coat of arms was granted on 7 January 1983. The official blazon is "Azure, a double chevron argent" (Norwegian: I blått en sølv dobbeltsparre). This means the arms have a blue field (background) and the charge is a double chevron that looks like the letter "M". The double chevron has a tincture of argent which means it is commonly colored white, but if it is made out of metal, then silver is used. The blue color in the field symbolizes the importance of the sea for this municipality which had a long and rugged coastline. The double chevron design was chosen since it looks like the letter "M", the initial letter in the name of the municipality. The three points in the "M" also refer to the three areas that formed Moland Municipality: Stokken Municipality, Flosta Municipality, and Austre Moland Municipality. The arms were designed by Oddvar André Enggav.

=== Churches ===
The Church of Norway had one parish (sokn) within Moland Municipality. At the time of the municipal dissolution, it was part of the Austre Moland prestegjeld and the Aust-Nedenes prosti (deanery) in the Diocese of Agder.

Churches in Moland Municipality
Parish (sokn)	Church name	Location of the church	Year built
Austre Moland	Austre Moland Church	Brekka	1673
Flosta	Flosta Church	Flosta	1632
Stokken	Stokken Church	Saltrød	1878

== Geography ==
The municipality consisted of the mainland area to the north and northeast of the town of Arendal plus the islands of Flosterøya and Tverrdalsøya. The highest point in the municipality was the 225-metre (738 ft) tall mountain Skrattereidknuten, a tripoint between Moland, Froland, and Tvedestrand municipalities.

Tvedestrand Municipality was located to the north, the Skagerrak was located to the east, Tromøy Municipality was located to the southeast, Arendal Municipality was located to the south, Øyestad Municipality was located to the southwest, and Froland Municipality was located to the west.

== Government ==
While it existed, Moland Municipality was responsible for primary education (through 10th grade), outpatient health services, senior citizen services, welfare and other social services, zoning, economic development, and municipal roads and utilities. The municipality was governed by a municipal council of directly elected representatives. The mayor was indirectly elected by a vote of the municipal council. The municipality was under the jurisdiction of the Nedenes District Court and the Agder Court of Appeal.

=== Municipal council ===
The municipal council (Kommunestyre) of Moland Municipality is made up of representatives that are elected to four-year terms. The tables below show the current and historical composition of the council by political party.

Moland kommunestyre 1988–1991
Party name (in Norwegian)	Number of representatives
Labour Party (Arbeiderpartiet)	15
Progress Party (Fremskrittspartiet)	3
Conservative Party (Høyre)	6
Christian Democratic Party (Kristelig Folkeparti)	3
Centre Party (Senterpartiet)	1
Socialist Left Party (Sosialistisk Venstreparti)	1
Liberal Party (Venstre)	2
Total number of members:	31
Note: On 1 January 1992, Moland Municipality became part of Arendal Municipality.

Moland kommunestyre 1984–1987
Party name (in Norwegian)	Number of representatives
Labour Party (Arbeiderpartiet)	16
Progress Party (Fremskrittspartiet)	2
Conservative Party (Høyre)	7
Christian Democratic Party (Kristelig Folkeparti)	4
Centre Party (Senterpartiet)	1
Liberal Party (Venstre)	1
Total number of members:	31

Moland kommunestyre 1980–1983
Party name (in Norwegian)	Number of representatives
Labour Party (Arbeiderpartiet)	14
Conservative Party (Høyre)	9
Christian Democratic Party (Kristelig Folkeparti)	5
Centre Party (Senterpartiet)	1
Liberal Party (Venstre)	2
Total number of members:	31

Moland kommunestyre 1976–1979
Party name (in Norwegian)	Number of representatives
Labour Party (Arbeiderpartiet)	16
Conservative Party (Høyre)	6
Christian Democratic Party (Kristelig Folkeparti)	5
New People's Party (Nye Folkepartiet)	2
Centre Party (Senterpartiet)	2
Total number of members:	31

Moland kommunestyre 1972–1975
Party name (in Norwegian)	Number of representatives
Labour Party (Arbeiderpartiet)	17
Conservative Party (Høyre)	5
Christian Democratic Party (Kristelig Folkeparti)	3
Centre Party (Senterpartiet)	2
Liberal Party (Venstre)	4
Total number of members:	31

Moland kommunestyre 1968–1971
Party name (in Norwegian)	Number of representatives
Labour Party (Arbeiderpartiet)	17
Conservative Party (Høyre)	5
Christian Democratic Party (Kristelig Folkeparti)	3
Centre Party (Senterpartiet)	1
Liberal Party (Venstre)	5
Total number of members:	31

Moland kommunestyre 1964–1967
Party name (in Norwegian)	Number of representatives
Labour Party (Arbeiderpartiet)	18
Conservative Party (Høyre)	5
Christian Democratic Party (Kristelig Folkeparti)	2
Centre Party (Senterpartiet)	1
Liberal Party (Venstre)	5
Total number of members:	31

=== Mayors ===
The mayor (Norwegian: ordfører) of Moland Municipality was the political leader of the municipality and the chairperson of the municipal council. The following people have held this position:

- 1962–1971: Thor Lund (Ap)
- 1971–1979: Ingar Olsen (Ap)
- 1979–1981: Tore A. Liltved (H)
- 1981–1983: Leif B. Svendsen (KrF)
- 1983–1989: Thor Lund (Ap)
- 1989–1991: Sigurd Ledaal (H)

== Notable people ==
- Tore A. Liltved, a local politician
- Thor Lund, a local politician and mechanic

== See also ==
- List of former municipalities of Norway
