= Norwegian County Road 410 =

Road in Norway

County Road 410
- Bokmål: Fylkesvei 410; Nynorsk: Fylkesveg 410

Route information
- Maintained by Norwegian Public Roads Administration
- Length: 33.8 km (21.0 mi)

Major junctions
- North end: E18 at Rødmyr
- South end: E18 at Harebakken

Location
- Country: Norway

Highway system
- Roads in Norway; National Roads; County Roads
← Fv409	→ Fv411

Norwegian county road 410 (Fylkesvei 410 or Fv410) is a Norwegian county road which runs for 33.8 kilometres (21.0 mi) between the Harebakken mall in Arendal Municipality and Rødmyr in Tvedestrand Municipality. Prior to 2010, this was a Norwegian national road, but in the transportation reforms that year, the road was transferred to county control.

The northern end of the road begins at the junction of the European route E18 highway and it heads south a short distance into the town of Tvedestrand. The road intersects with Norwegian County Road 411 in the town. After about 8 kilometres (5.0 mi), the road enters Arendal Municipality, where the road is locally called the Kystveien (English: the coast road) since it generally follows the coastline throughout the municipality. The road passes through the villages of Borås, Vatnebu, Strengereid, Eydehavn, and Saltrød before finally entering the town of Arendal. At Barbu, the road turns north into the Barbudalen valley. It passes the Arendal Station before intersecting with Norwegian County Road 420. The road passes the Harebakken mall before reaching the southern terminus of the road at the junction with the European route E18 highway.

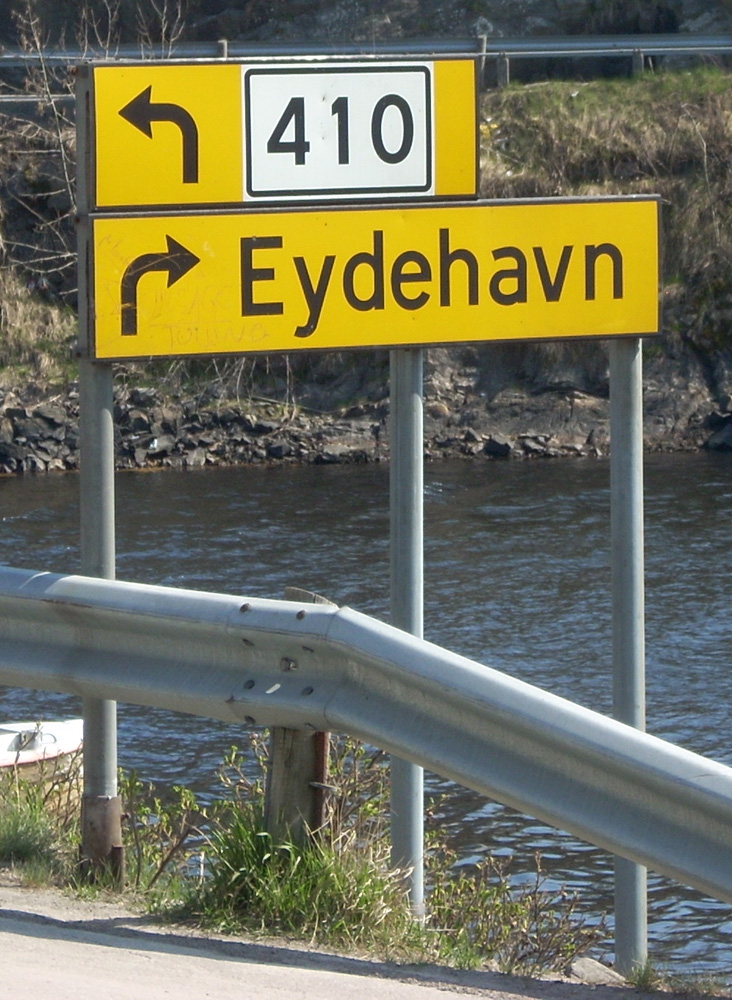
Sign for Fv 410

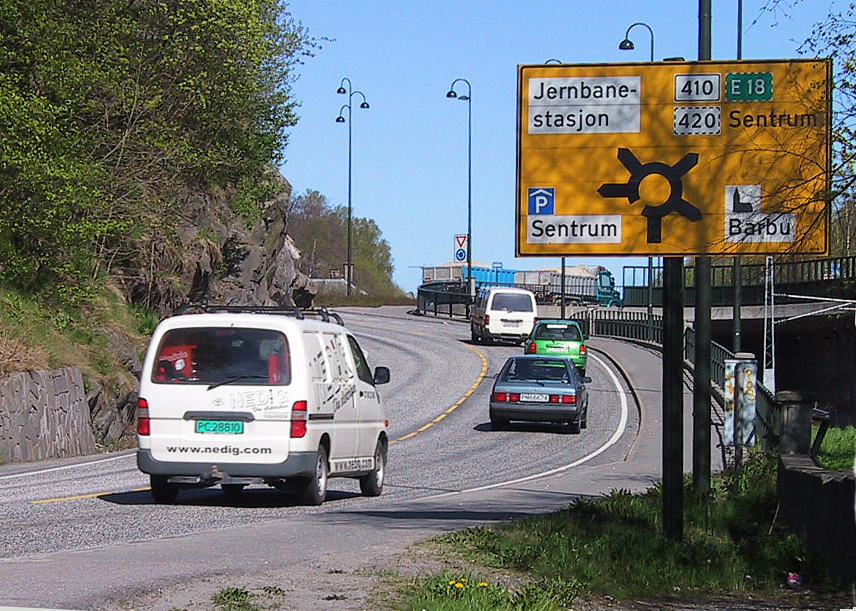
View of the roadway

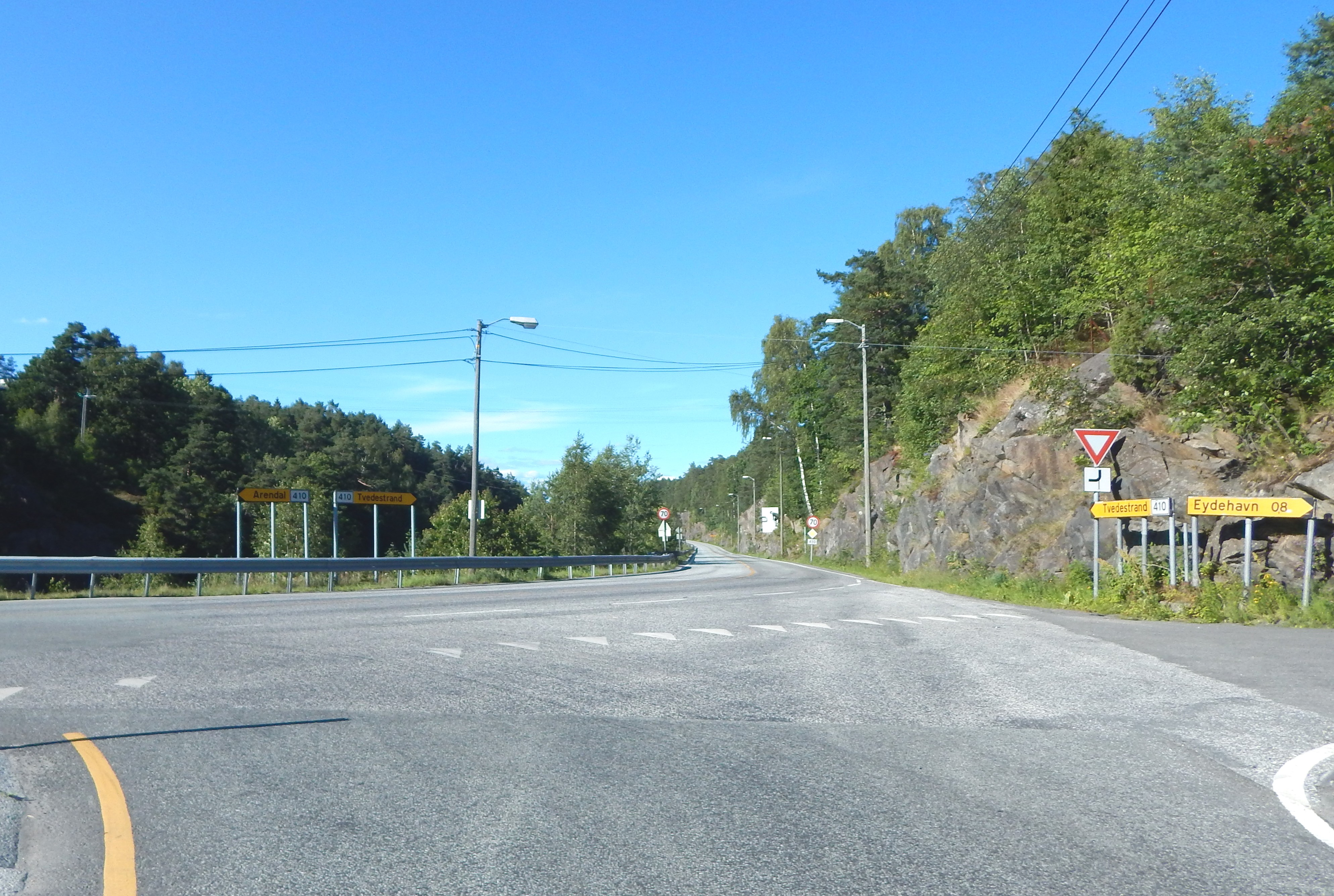
Alternate view of the road
