= Staubø =

Village in Arendal Municipality, Norway

- Village
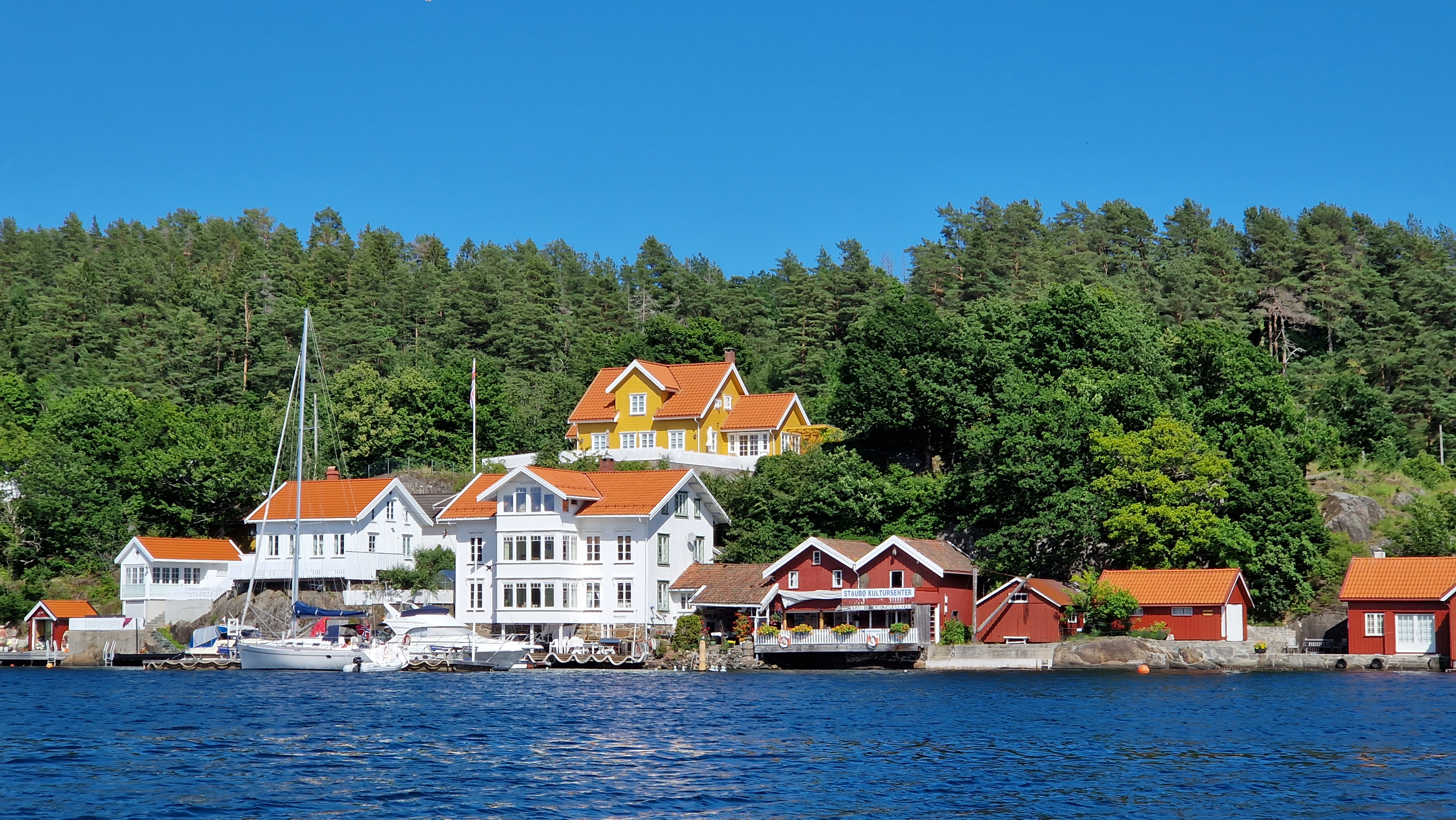
- View of the village
- Interactive map of Staubø
- Coordinates: 58.5627°N 08.9827°E
- Country: Norway
- Region: Southern Norway
- County: Agder
- District: Østre Agder
- Municipality: Arendal Municipality
- Elevation: 18 m (59 ft)
- Time zone: UTC+01:00 (CET)
  - Summer (DST): UTC+02:00 (CEST)
- Post Code: 4920 Staubø

Staubø is a village in Arendal Municipality in Agder county, Norway. The village is located on the western shore of the island of Tverrdalsøya. Staubø lies immediately north of the large village of Kilsund and about 1 kilometre (0.62 mi) northwest of the village of Holmsund. Staubø is considered part of the urban area of Kilsund by Statistics Norway.

== History ==
The area surrounding Staubø was part of the old Flosta Municipality (from 1902 to 1962) and during that time the village of Staubø was the administrative centre of Flosta Municipality.
