= Flosta Municipality =

Former municipality in Aust-Agder, Norway

Flosta Municipality Flosta herred
- Former municipality
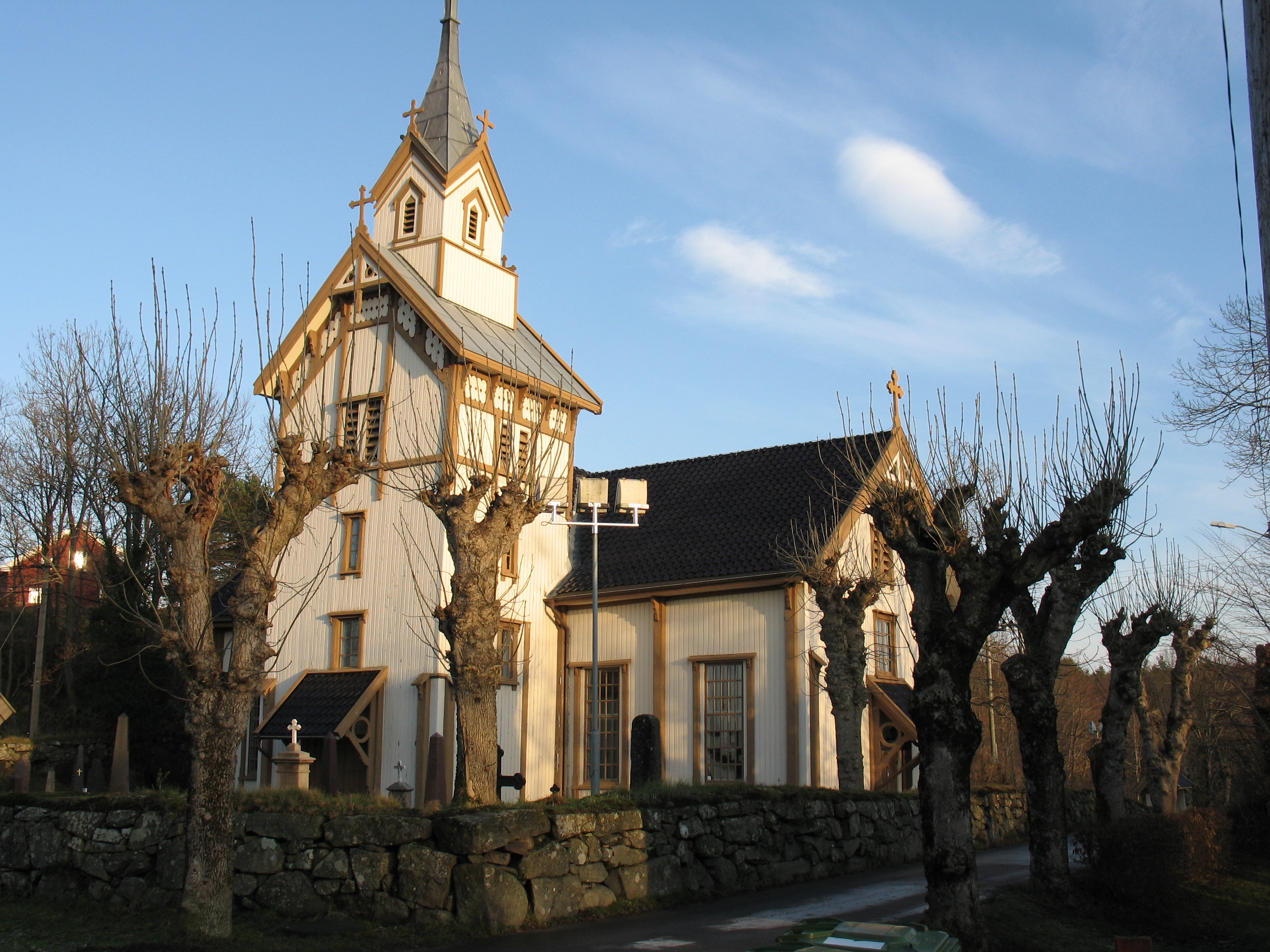
- View of the Flosta Church

- Aust-Agder within Norway

- Flosta within Aust-Agder
- Coordinates: 58°31′43″N 08°56′02″E
- Country: Norway
- County: Aust-Agder
- District: Østre Agder
- Established: 1 Jan 1902
  - Preceded by: Dybvaag Municipality
- Disestablished: 1 Jan 1962
  - Succeeded by: Moland Municipality
- Administrative centre: Kilsund

Government
  - Mayor (*1959–1961): Torstein Lønvik (H)

Area (upon dissolution)
  - Total: 18.9 km^{2} (7.3 sq mi)
  - Rank: #663 in Norway
- Highest elevation: 123 m (404 ft)

Population (1961)
  - Total: 1,218
  - Rank: #607 in Norway
  - Density: 64.4/km^{2} (167/sq mi)
  - Change (10 years): ▼ −6.6%
- Demonym: Flostafolk

Official language
  - Norwegian form: Bokmål
- Time zone: UTC+01:00 (CET)
  - Summer (DST): UTC+02:00 (CEST)
- ISO 3166 code: NO-0916

Flosta is a former municipality in the old Aust-Agder county, Norway. The 18.9-square-kilometre (7.3 sq mi) municipality existed from 1902 until its dissolution in 1962. The area is now part of Arendal Municipality in the traditional district of Østre Agder in Agder county. The administrative centre was at Staubø in the village of Kilsund. Other villages in the municipality included Eikeland, Borås, and Vatnebu.

Prior to its dissolution in 1962, the 18.9-square-kilometre (7.3 sq mi) municipality was the 663rd largest by area out of the 731 municipalities in Norway. Flosta Municipality was the 607th most populous municipality in Norway with a population of about 1,218. The municipality's population density was 64.4 inhabitants per square kilometre (167/sq mi) and its population had decreased by 6.6% over the previous 10-year period.

== General information ==
The municipality of Flosta was established on 1 January 1902 when Dybvaag Municipality was divided into two: the southwestern district (population: 1,892) became the new Flosta Municipality and the northeastern district (population: 3,235) continued as a smaller Dybvaag Municipality. The new Flosta Municipality included the islands of Flosterøya and Tverrdalsøya and some of the mainland north of those islands.

During the 1960s, there were many municipal mergers across Norway due to the work of the Schei Committee. On 1 January 1962, Flosta Municipality was dissolved and the following areas were merged to form the new Moland Municipality:

- all of Flosta Municipality (population: 1,205)
- all of Austre Moland Municipality (population: 1,607)
- all of Stokken Municipality (population: 2,783)
- the Strengereid area of Tvedestrand Municipality (population: 375)

Later, on 1 January 1992, Moland Municipality (population: 8,148) was merged into the neighboring Arendal Municipality.

=== Name ===
The municipality (originally the parish) is named after the island of Flosterøya (Old Norse: Flóstr) since the historic Flosta Church was built there. The meaning of the name is unknown, but one theory is that it comes from the word flóðr which means "high tide" or "flood".

=== Churches ===
The Church of Norway had one parish (sokn) within Flosta Municipality. At the time of the municipal dissolution, it was part of the Dypvåg prestegjeld and the Aust-Nedenes prosti (deanery) in the Diocese of Agder.

Churches in Flosta Municipality
Parish (sokn)	Church name	Location of the church	Year built
Flosta	Flosta Church	Flosta	1632

== Geography ==
The municipality primarily encompassed the two islands of Flosterøya and Tverrdalsøya and about 9 square kilometres (3.5 sq mi) on the mainland just north of the islands including the villages of Eikeland, Borås, and Vatnebu. The highest point in the municipality was the 123-metre (404 ft) tall mountain Eikelandsheia on the mainland. Dypvåg Municipality was located to the north, the Skagerrak was located to the east, Tromøy Municipality was located to the south, Stokken Municipality was located to the southwest, and Holt Municipality was located to the west.

== Government ==
While it existed, Flosta Municipality was responsible for primary education (through 10th grade), outpatient health services, senior citizen services, welfare and other social services, zoning, economic development, and municipal roads and utilities. The municipality was governed by a municipal council of directly elected representatives. The mayor was indirectly elected by a vote of the municipal council. The municipality was under the jurisdiction of the Holt District Court and the Agder Court of Appeal.

=== Municipal council ===
The municipal council (Herredsstyre) of Flosta Municipality was made up of 13 representatives that were elected to four year terms. The tables below show the historical composition of the council by political party.

Flosta herredsstyre 1959–1961
Party name (in Norwegian)	Number of representatives
Labour Party (Arbeiderpartiet)	5
Conservative Party (Høyre)	4
Liberal Party (Venstre)	4
Total number of members:	13
Note: On 1 January 1962, Flosta Municipality became part of Moland Municipality.

Flosta herredsstyre 1955–1959
Party name (in Norwegian)	Number of representatives
Labour Party (Arbeiderpartiet)	5
Conservative Party (Høyre)	4
Liberal Party (Venstre)	4
Total number of members:	13

Flosta herredsstyre 1951–1955
Party name (in Norwegian)	Number of representatives
Labour Party (Arbeiderpartiet)	4
Liberal Party (Venstre)	4
List of workers, fishermen, and small farmholders (Arbeidere, fiskere, småbrukere liste)	4
Total number of members:	12

Flosta herredsstyre 1947–1951
Party name (in Norwegian)	Number of representatives
Labour Party (Arbeiderpartiet)	3
Joint List(s) of Non-Socialist Parties (Borgerlige Felleslister)	9
Total number of members:	12

Flosta herredsstyre 1945–1947
Party name (in Norwegian)	Number of representatives
Labour Party (Arbeiderpartiet)	5
Local List(s) (Lokale lister)	7
Total number of members:	12

Flosta herredsstyre 1937–1941*
Party name (in Norwegian)	Number of representatives
Labour Party (Arbeiderpartiet)	2
Joint List(s) of Non-Socialist Parties (Borgerlige Felleslister)	2
Local List(s) (Lokale lister)	8
Total number of members:	12
Note: Due to the German occupation of Norway during World War II, no elections were held for new municipal councils until after the war ended in 1945.

=== Mayors ===
The mayor (Norwegian: ordfører) of Flosta Municipality was the political leader of the municipality and the chairperson of the municipal council. The following people have held this position:

- 1902–1903: Erik Andersen Kilsund
- 1903–1904: Christian Taraldsen Nærestø
- 1905–1913: Terje Andersen Nærestø
- 1914–1916: Anders Berntzen Arnevik
- 1917–1919: Thor Thorsen Brårvik
- 1920–1921: Andreas Kolstad
- 1922–1922: Gunder P. Jensen Nærestø
- 1923–1928: Elling Ellingsen Sundet
- 1929–1941: Bernt Berntzen Arnevik
- 1942–1945: Bjarne Jacobsen (NS)
- 1945–1951: Bernt Berntzen Arnevik
- 1951–1955: John Christian Johnsen (V)
- 1955–1959: Bertin Stiansen (Ap)
- 1959–1961: Torstein Lønvik (H)

== See also ==
- List of former municipalities of Norway
