= Stokken =

Stokken may refer to:

== Places ==
- Stokken Church, a church in Arendal Municipality in Agder county, Norway
- Stokken Municipality, a former municipality in the old Aust-Agder county, Norway

== People ==
- Aagot Støkken (1923-2008), a Norwegian actress
- Martin Stokken (1923-1984), a Norwegian cross-country skier
