= Borås (disambiguation) =

Borås is a city in southwestern Sweden in Vastra Gotaland county.

Borås or Boras may also refer to:

== People ==
- Scott Boras (born 1952) is an American sports agent, specializing in baseball

== Places ==
=== Kazakhstan ===
- Beskaragay, also known as "Boras"

=== Norway ===
- Borås, Norway, a village in the municipality of Arendal in Agder county

=== Sweden ===
- Borås Municipality, a municipality in Västra Götaland county
- Borås Arena, a football stadium in the city of Borås
- University of Borås, a university college in the city of Borås

== Sports ==
- Borås Basket, a professional basketball club based in the Swedish town of Borås
- Borås AIK, a Swedish football club located in Borås
- KFUM Borås, a Swedish multi-sport club based in Borås
- Borås Ishall, an indoor arena located in Borås, Sweden
- Borås HC, a Swedish professional ice hockey club, based in Borås

== Other ==
- Borås Djurpark, a zoo in the northern part of central Borås in Sweden
- Borås Tidning, a Swedish-language daily newspaper published in Borås, Sweden

== See also ==
- Borras, a hamlet in Wales
- Bora (disambiguation)
