= Stokken Municipality =

Former municipality in Aust-Agder, Norway

Stokken Municipality Stokken herred
- Former municipality
- Aust-Agder within Norway

- Stokken within Aust-Agder
- Coordinates: 58°29′30″N 08°50′38″E
- Country: Norway
- County: Aust-Agder
- District: Østre Agder
- Established: 1 July 1919
  - Preceded by: Austre Moland Municipality
- Disestablished: 1 Jan 1962
  - Succeeded by: Moland Municipality
- Administrative centre: Eydehavn

Government
  - Mayor (1945–1961): Johannes Kinserdal (Ap)

Area (upon dissolution)
  - Total: 10.7 km^{2} (4.1 sq mi)
  - Rank: #671 in Norway
- Highest elevation: 113 m (371 ft)

Population (1961)
  - Total: 2,747
  - Rank: #340 in Norway
  - Density: 256.7/km^{2} (665/sq mi)
  - Change (10 years): ▲ +20.7%
- Demonym: Stokkenfolk

Official language
  - Norwegian form: Bokmål
- Time zone: UTC+01:00 (CET)
  - Summer (DST): UTC+02:00 (CEST)
- ISO 3166 code: NO-0917

Stokken is a former municipality in the old Aust-Agder county, Norway. The 10.7-square-kilometre (4.1 sq mi) municipality existed from 1919 until its dissolution in 1962. The area is now part of Arendal Municipality in the traditional district of Østre Agder in Agder county. The administrative centre was the village of Eydehavn. Stokken Church was the main church for the small municipality located just outside the town of Arendal.

Prior to its dissolution in 1962, the 10.7-square-kilometre (4.1 sq mi) municipality was the 671st largest by area out of the 731 municipalities in Norway. Stokken Municipality was the 340th most populous municipality in Norway with a population of about 2,747. The municipality's population density was 256.7 inhabitants per square kilometre (665/sq mi) and its population had increased by 20.7% over the previous 10-year period.

== General information ==
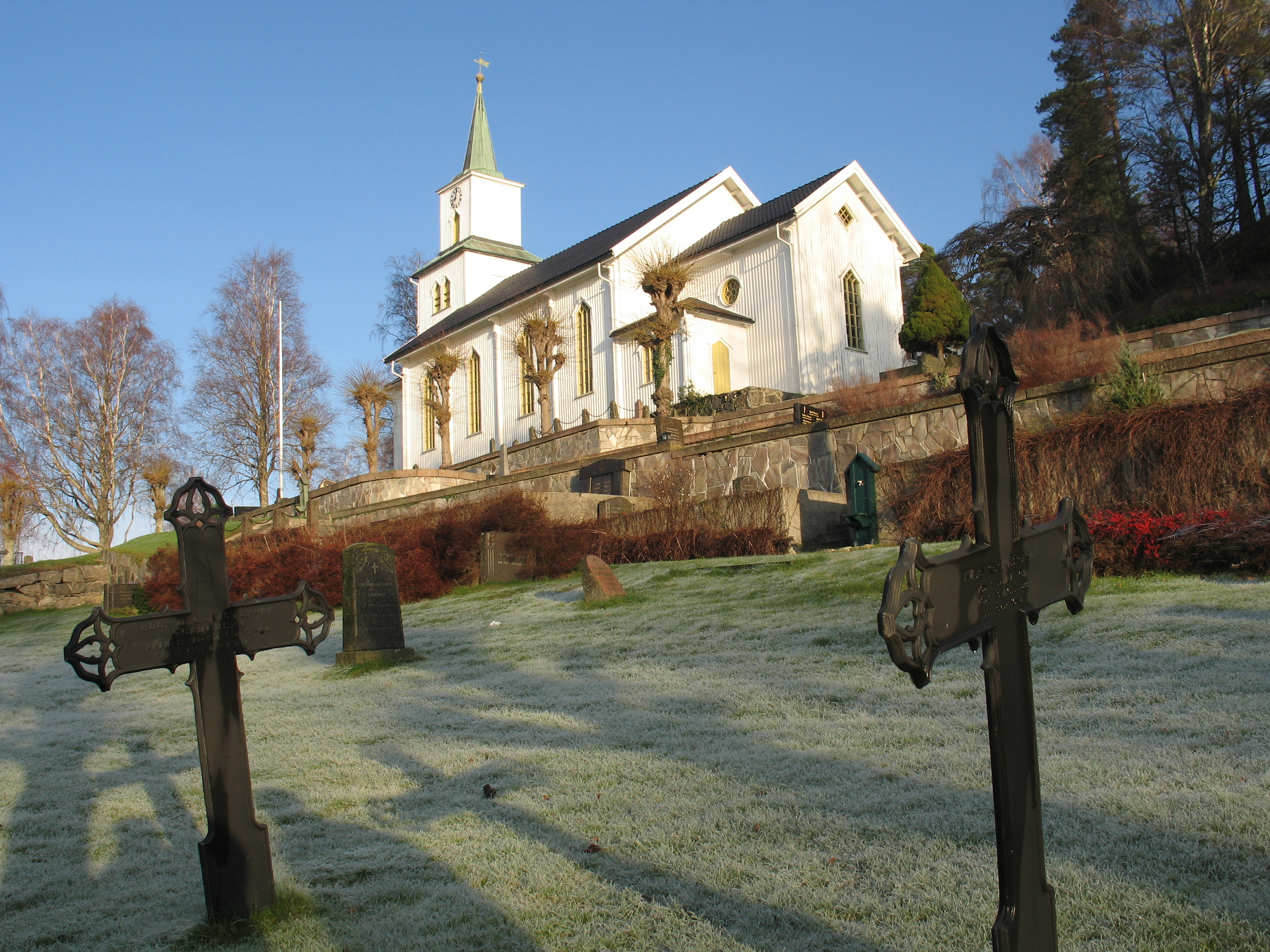
View of the local Stokken Church

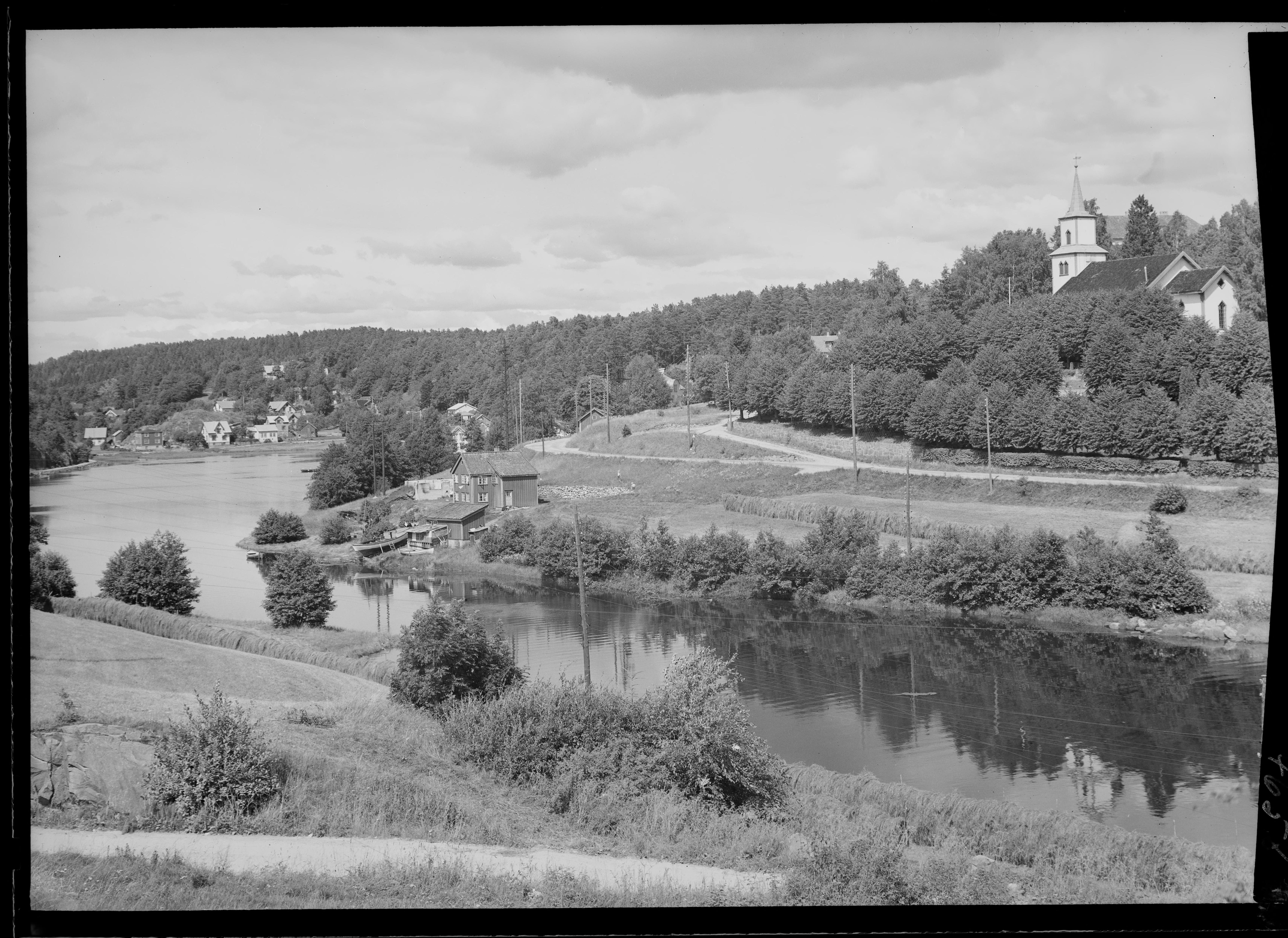
View of the Saltrød area in 1947

The municipality of Stokken was established on 1 July 1919 when Austre Moland Municipality was divided into two: the southeastern district (population: 1,683) became the new Stokken Municipality and the northwestern district (population: 1,289) continued as a smaller Austre Moland Municipality.

During the 1960s, there were many municipal mergers across Norway due to the work of the Schei Committee. On 1 January 1962, Stokken Municipality was dissolved and the following areas were merged to form the new Moland Municipality:

- all of Stokken Municipality (population: 2,783)
- all of Austre Moland Municipality (population: 1,607)
- all of Flosta Municipality (population: 1,205)
- the Strengereid area of Tvedestrand Municipality (population: 375)

Later, on 1 January 1992, Moland Municipality (population: 8,148) was merged into the neighboring Arendal Municipality.

=== Name ===
The municipality (originally the parish) is named Stokken, after the old name for the local school district. The name is the definite form of the word stokk which means "log" or "tree trunk".

=== Churches ===
The Church of Norway had one parish (sokn) within Stokken Municipality. At the time of the municipal dissolution, it was part of the Austre Moland prestegjeld and the Aust-Nedenes prosti (deanery) in the Diocese of Agder.

Churches in Stokken Municipality
Parish (sokn)	Church name	Location of the church	Year built
Stokken	Stokken Church	Saltrød	1878

== Geography ==
The highest point in the municipality was the 113-metre (371 ft) tall mountain Ørnereiråsen. Austre Moland Municipality was located to the west and north, Holt Municipality was located to the northeast, Tromøy Municipality was located to the east and south, and Arendal Municipality was located to the southwest.

== Government ==
While it existed, Stokken Municipality was responsible for primary education (through 10th grade), outpatient health services, senior citizen services, welfare and other social services, zoning, economic development, and municipal roads and utilities. The municipality was governed by a municipal council of directly elected representatives. The mayor was indirectly elected by a vote of the municipal council. The municipality was under the jurisdiction of the Nedenes District Court and the Agder Court of Appeal.

=== Municipal council ===
The municipal council (Herredsstyre) of Stokken Municipality was made up of 19 representatives that were elected to four year terms. The tables below show the historical composition of the council by political party.

Stokken herredsstyre 1959–1961
Party name (in Norwegian)	Number of representatives
Labour Party (Arbeiderpartiet)	15
Joint List(s) of Non-Socialist Parties (Borgerlige Felleslister)	4
Total number of members:	19
Note: On 1 January 1962, Stokken Municipality became part of Moland Municipality.

Stokken herredsstyre 1955–1959
Party name (in Norwegian)	Number of representatives
Labour Party (Arbeiderpartiet)	14
Joint List(s) of Non-Socialist Parties (Borgerlige Felleslister)	5
Total number of members:	19

Stokken herredsstyre 1951–1955
Party name (in Norwegian)	Number of representatives
Labour Party (Arbeiderpartiet)	12
Joint List(s) of Non-Socialist Parties (Borgerlige Felleslister)	4
Total number of members:	16

Stokken herredsstyre 1947–1951
Party name (in Norwegian)	Number of representatives
Labour Party (Arbeiderpartiet)	11
Joint List(s) of Non-Socialist Parties (Borgerlige Felleslister)	5
Total number of members:	16

Stokken herredsstyre 1945–1947
Party name (in Norwegian)	Number of representatives
Labour Party (Arbeiderpartiet)	13
Communist Party (Kommunistiske Parti)	1
Joint List(s) of Non-Socialist Parties (Borgerlige Felleslister)	2
Total number of members:	16

Stokken herredsstyre 1937–1941*
Party name (in Norwegian)	Number of representatives
Labour Party (Arbeiderpartiet)	11
Joint List(s) of Non-Socialist Parties (Borgerlige Felleslister)	5
Total number of members:	16
Note: Due to the German occupation of Norway during World War II, no elections were held for new municipal councils until after the war ended in 1945.

=== Mayors ===
The mayor (Norwegian: ordfører) of Stokken Municipality was the political leader of the municipality and the chairperson of the municipal council. The following people have held this position:

- 1919–1921: Guttorm Fløistad
- 1921–1921: Andres Haugmoen
- 1922–1928: Nils Hjelmtveit
- 1928–1931: Hans J. Bakke
- 1931–1937: Nils Hjelmtveit
- 1937–1941: Syver Kristiansen
- 1942–1945: Lauritz Harry Jensen (NS)
- 1945–1961: Johannes Kinserdal (Ap)

== See also ==
- List of former municipalities of Norway
