= Borås, Norway =

Village in Arendal Municipality, Norway

Borås
- Village
- Interactive map of Borås
- Coordinates: 58.56731°N 8.95184°E
- Country: Norway
- Region: Southern Norway
- County: Agder
- District: Østre Agder
- Municipality: Arendal Municipality
- Elevation: 16 m (52 ft)
- Time zone: UTC+01:00 (CET)
  - Summer (DST): UTC+02:00 (CEST)
- Post Code: 4900 Tvedestrand

Borås is a village in Arendal Municipality in Agder county, Norway. The village is located along the Norwegian County Road 410 on the east side (mainland side) of the Eikelandsfjorden. The large village of Kilsund lies about 3 kilometres (1.9 mi) to the southeast on the nearby island of Tverrdalsøya and the village of Vatnebu lies about 2 kilometres (1.2 mi) to the south on the mainland.
