= Åmdalsøyra =

Village in Arendal Municipality, Norway

Åmdalsøyra Omdalsøyra Omdalsøyren
- Village
- Interactive map of Åmdalsøyra
- Coordinates: 58.49457°N 8.88108°E
- Country: Norway
- Region: Southern Norway
- County: Agder
- District: Østre Agder
- Municipality: Arendal Municipality
- Elevation: 6 m (20 ft)
- Time zone: UTC+01:00 (CET)
  - Summer (DST): UTC+02:00 (CEST)
- Post Code: 4812 Kongshavn

Åmdalsøyra is a village in Arendal Municipality in Agder county, Norway, along the Tromøysundet strait on the northern shore of the island of Tromøya. The village of Kongshavn lies just to the southwest of Åmdalsøyra, and the village of Eydehavn lies just across the strait on the mainland.
