= Holmesund =

Village in Arendal Municipality, Norway

Holmesund Holmsund
- Village
- Interactive map of Holmesund
- Coordinates: 58.5578°N 08.9952°E
- Country: Norway
- Region: Southern Norway
- County: Agder
- District: Østre Agder
- Municipality: Arendal Municipality
- Elevation: 8 m (26 ft)
- Time zone: UTC+01:00 (CET)
  - Summer (DST): UTC+02:00 (CEST)
- Post Code: 4920 Staubø

Holmesund is a village in Arendal Municipality in Agder county, Norway. The village is located on the eastern shore of the island of Tverrdalsøya, about 1 kilometre (0.62 mi) east of the large village of Kilsund and about the same distance southeast of the village of Staubø. Holmesund is considered by Statistics Norway to be part of the Kilsund urban area.
