= Norwegian County Road 411 =

Road in Agder, Norway

Coordinates: 58.62433°N 08.926863°E

County Road 411
- Bokmål: Fylkesvei 411; Nynorsk: Fylkesveg 411

Route information
- Maintained by Norwegian Public Roads Administration
- Length: 27.8 km (17.3 mi)

Major junctions
- Northeast end: Fv416 Bossvik, Risør Municipality
- Southwest end: Fv410 Tvedestrand

Location
- Country: Norway

Highway system
- Roads in Norway; National Roads; County Roads
← Fv410	→ Fv412

Norwegian county road 411 (Fv411) is a Norwegian county road in Agder county, Norway. The 27.8-kilometre (17.3 mi) long road runs through Tvedestrand Municipality and Risør Municipality. The western end of the road starts at the junction of Norwegian County Road 410 in the town of Tvedestrand in Tvedestrand Municipality. It then heads along the coastline until it reaches the junction with Norwegian County Road 416 at Bossvika in Risør Municipality.
