= Kongshavn, Arendal =

Village in Arendal Municipality, Norway

Kongshavn Kongshamn (unofficial)
- Village
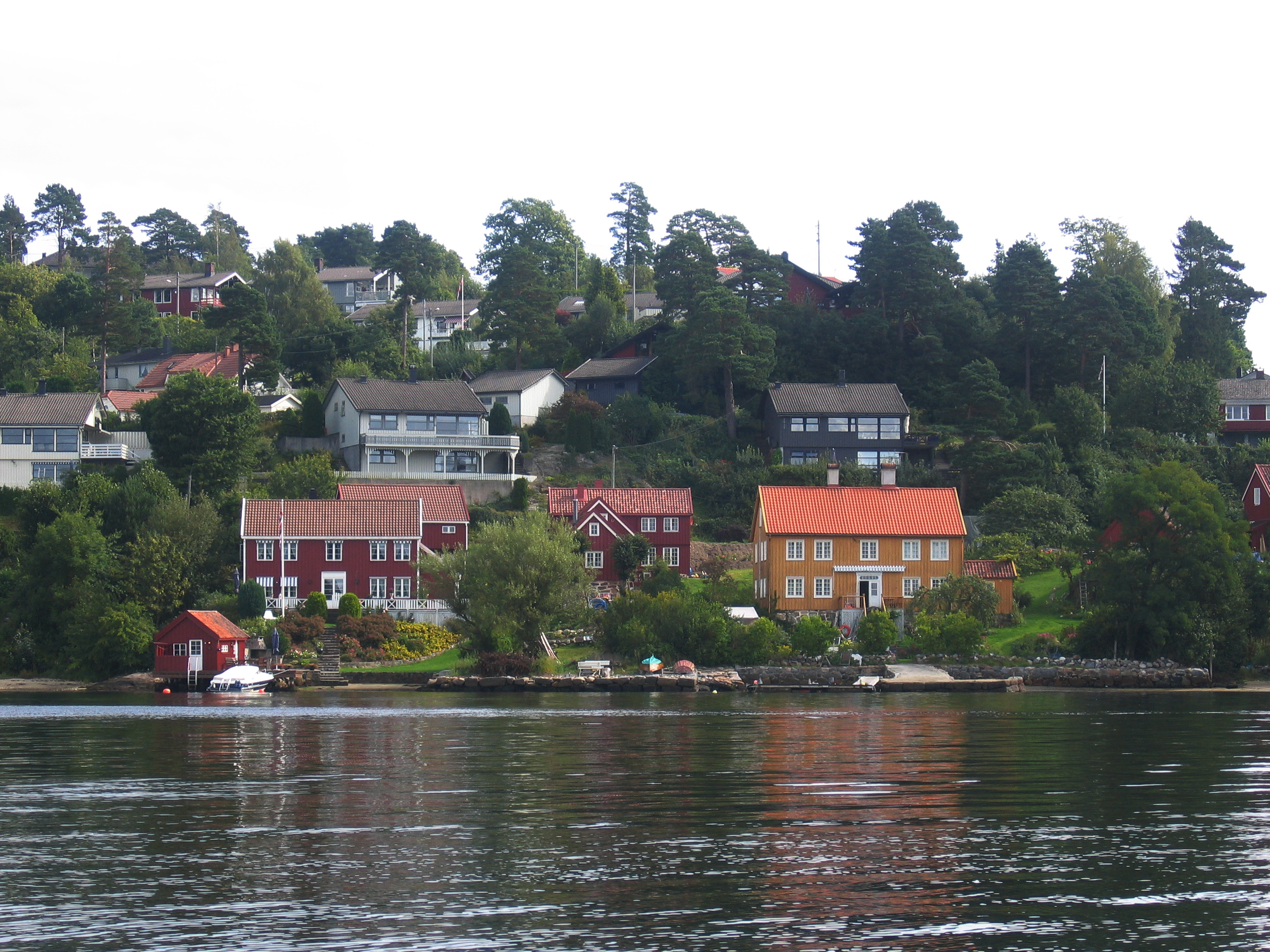
- View of the Kongshavn area on Tromøya
- Interactive map of Kongshavn
- Coordinates: 58.4862°N 08.8634°E
- Country: Norway
- Region: Southern Norway
- County: Agder
- District: Østre Agder
- Municipality: Arendal Municipality

Area
  - Total: 0.96 km^{2} (0.37 sq mi)
- Elevation: 11 m (36 ft)

Population (2012)
  - Total: 891
  - Density: 928/km^{2} (2,400/sq mi)
- Time zone: UTC+01:00 (CET)
  - Summer (DST): UTC+02:00 (CEST)
- Post Code: 4812 Kongshavn

Kongshavn is a village in Arendal Municipality in Agder county, Norway. Kongshavn is located on the north side of the island of Tromøya, across the Tromøysundet strait from the village of Eydehavn. It is about 11 kilometres (6.8 mi) east of the town of Arendal and it is directly west of the village of Åmdalsøyra.

The 0.96-square-kilometre (240-acre) village had a population (2012) of 891 and a population density of 928 inhabitants per square kilometre (2,400/sq mi). Since 2012, the population and area data for this village area has not been separately tracked by Statistics Norway.

== Name ==
It is said that Kongshavn was a safe haven for the king's ships during the Viking Age. Kongshavn is a Norwegian language word meaning "King's Landing" or "King's Port". The first element is kong which means "king" and the second element is havn which means "harbor".
