= Sagene, Agder =

Village in Arendal Municipality, Norway

Sagene
- Village
- Interactive map of Sagene
- Coordinates: 58.53651°N 8.8557°E
- Country: Norway
- Region: Southern Norway
- County: Agder
- District: Østre Agder
- Municipality: Arendal Municipality
- Elevation: 24 m (79 ft)
- Time zone: UTC+01:00 (CET)
  - Summer (DST): UTC+02:00 (CEST)
- Post Code: 4810 Eydehavn

Sagene is a village in Arendal Municipality in Agder county, Norway. The village is located about 2 kilometres (1.2 mi) northwest of the village of Strengereid and about 3 kilometres (1.9 mi) southeast of the village of Brekka. The lake Langangsvannet lies just east of the village and the lake Molandsvann lies a short distance to the west of the village.
