= Vatnebu =

Village in Arendal Municipality, Norway

- Village
- Interactive map of Vatnebu
- Coordinates: 58.5533°N 08.9404°E
- Country: Norway
- Region: Southern Norway
- County: Agder
- District: Østre Agder
- Municipality: Arendal Municipality
- Elevation: 17 m (56 ft)
- Time zone: UTC+01:00 (CET)
  - Summer (DST): UTC+02:00 (CEST)
- Post Code: 4900 Tvedestrand

Vatnebu is a village in Arendal Municipality in Agder county, Norway. The village is located on the mainland near the Skagerrak coast, about 2 kilometres (1.2 mi) southwest of the village of Kilsund on the nearby island of Tverrdalsøya and about 8 kilometres (5.0 mi) northeast of the village of Eydehavn.
