= Kilsund =

Village in Arendal Municipality, Norway

- Village
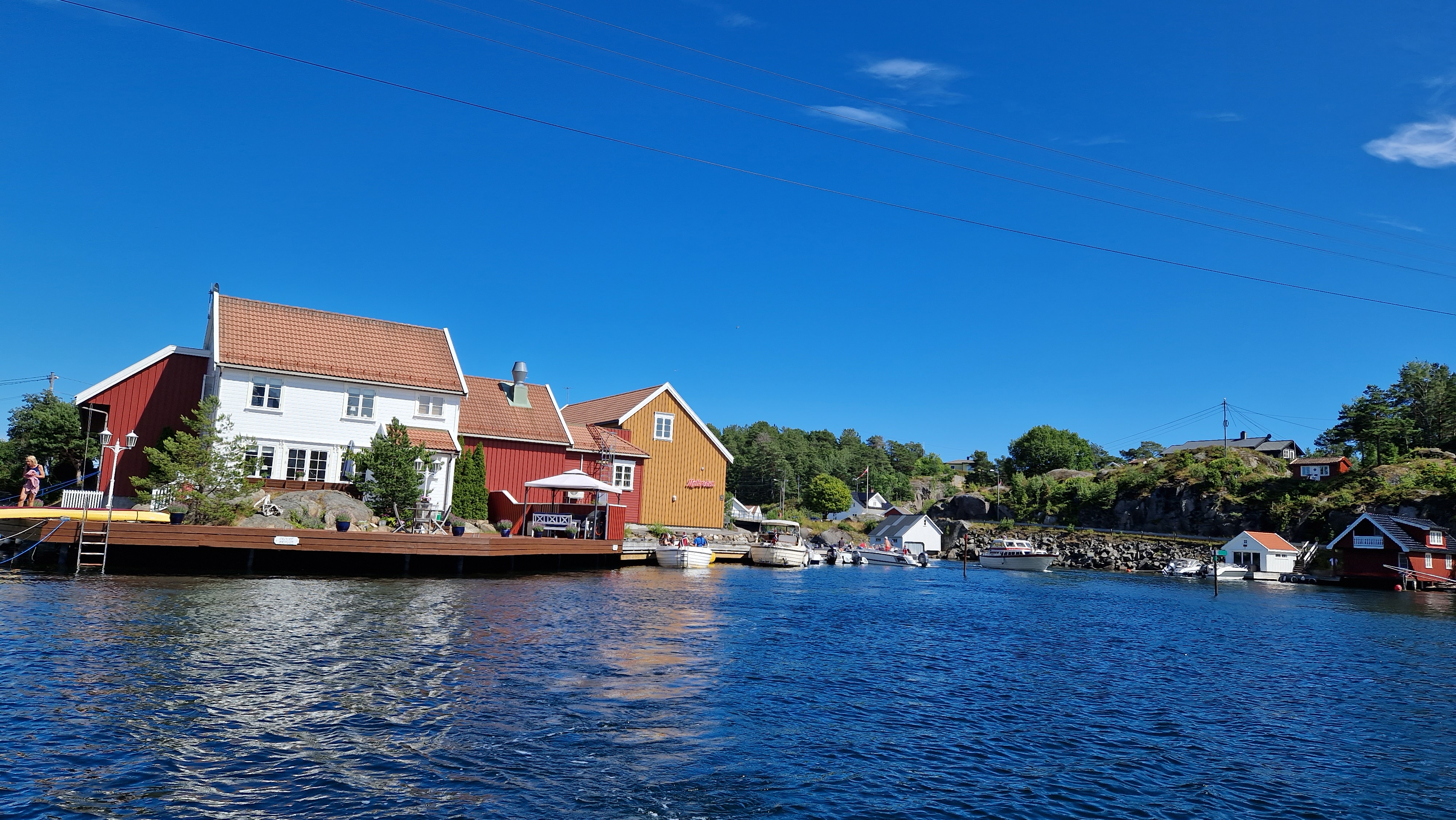
- View of the village
- Interactive map of Kilsund
- Coordinates: 58.55322°N 8.97692°E
- Country: Norway
- Region: Southern Norway
- County: Agder
- District: Østre Agder
- Municipality: Arendal Municipality

Area
  - Total: 1.01 km^{2} (0.39 sq mi)
- Elevation: 28 m (92 ft)

Population (2025)
  - Total: 656
  - Density: 650/km^{2} (1,700/sq mi)
- Time zone: UTC+01:00 (CET)
  - Summer (DST): UTC+02:00 (CEST)
- Post Code: 4920 Staubø

Kilsund is a village in Arendal Municipality in Agder county, Norway. The village is located on the island of Tverrdalsøya, although the village has grown over the bridge onto the nearby island of Flosterøya a short distance to the south. The village lies about 6.5 kilometres (4.0 mi) northeast of the village of Strengereid, about 10 kilometres (6.2 mi) northeast of the village of Eydehavn, about 16 kilometres (9.9 mi) northeast of the town of Arendal, and about 8 kilometres (5.0 mi) south of the town of Tvedestrand. Kilsund has two small villages located just to the north and east: Staubø and Holmesund.

The 1.01-square-kilometre (250-acre) village has a population (2025) of 656 and a population density of 650 inhabitants per square kilometre (1,700/sq mi).
