= Austre Moland Municipality =

Former municipality in Aust-Agder, Norway

Austre Moland Municipality Austre Moland herad
- Former municipality
- Østre Moland herred (historic name)
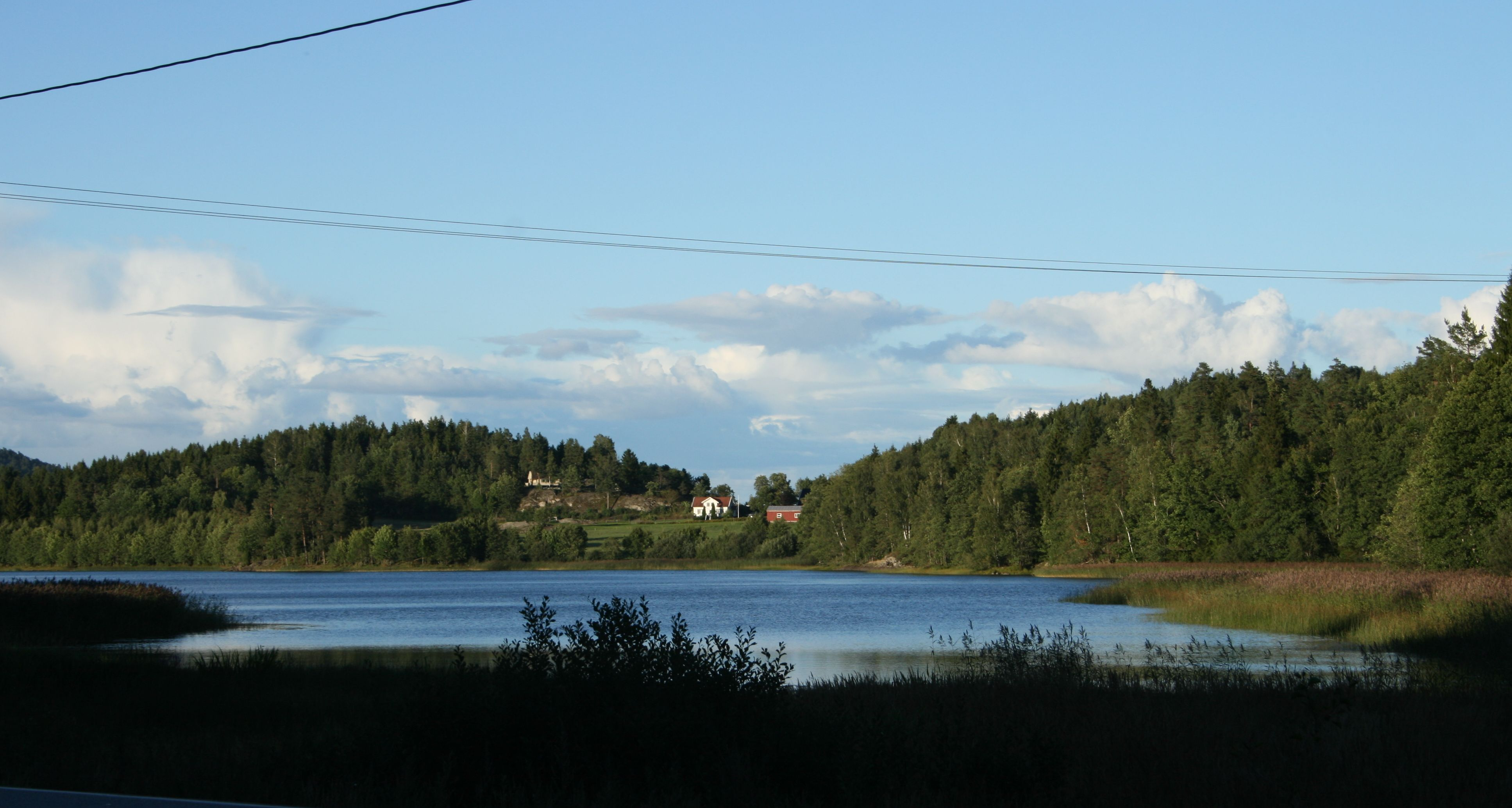
- View of the local lake Molandsvannet

- Aust-Agder within Norway

- Austre Moland within Aust-Agder
- Coordinates: 58°32′37″N 08°48′42″E
- Country: Norway
- County: Aust-Agder
- District: Østre Agder
- Established: 1 Jan 1838
  - Created as: Formannskapsdistrikt
- Disestablished: 1 Jan 1962
  - Succeeded by: Moland Municipality
- Administrative centre: Brekka

Government
  - Mayor (1959–1961): Torstein Bråten (V)

Area (upon dissolution)
  - Total: 86.1 km^{2} (33.2 sq mi)
  - Rank: #557 in Norway
- Highest elevation: 225 m (738 ft)

Population (1961)
  - Total: 1,556
  - Rank: #545 in Norway
  - Density: 18.1/km^{2} (47/sq mi)
  - Change (10 years): ▲ +5.9%
- Demonym: Molending

Official language
  - Norwegian form: Nynorsk
- Time zone: UTC+01:00 (CET)
  - Summer (DST): UTC+02:00 (CEST)
- ISO 3166 code: NO-0918

Austre Moland is a former municipality in the old Aust-Agder county, Norway. The 86.1-square-kilometre (33.2 sq mi) municipality existed from 1838 until its dissolution in 1962. The area is now part of Arendal Municipality in the traditional district of Østre Agder in Agder county. The administrative centre was the village of Brekka where the Austre Moland Church is located.

Prior to its dissolution in 1962, the 86.1-square-kilometre (33.2 sq mi) municipality was the 557th largest by area out of the 731 municipalities in Norway. Austre Moland Municipality was the 545th most populous municipality in Norway with a population of about 1,556. The municipality's population density was 18.1 inhabitants per square kilometre (47/sq mi) and its population had increased by 5.9% over the previous 10-year period.

== General information ==
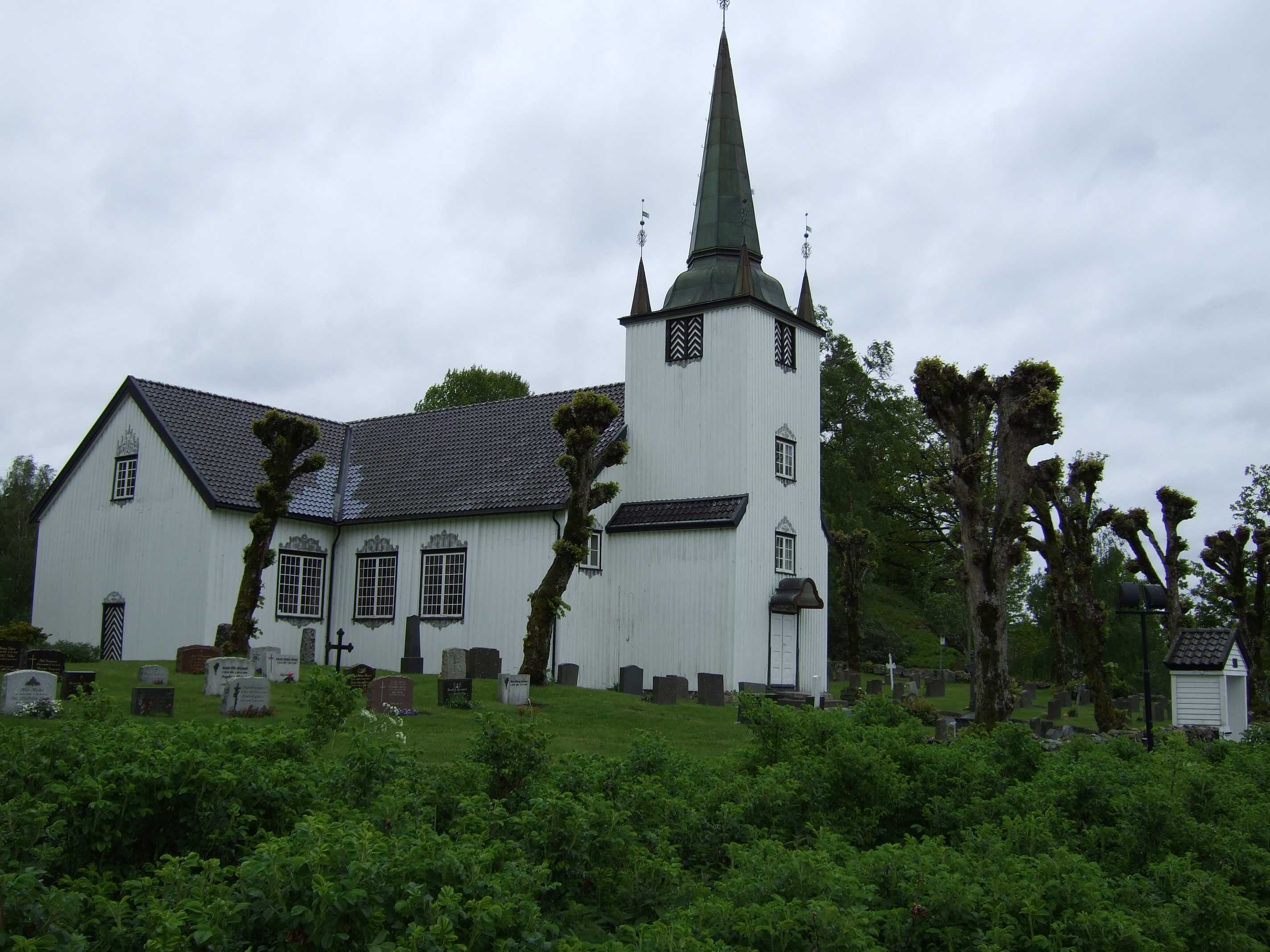
View of the Austre Moland Church

The parish of Østre Moland (later spelled Austre Moland) was established as a municipality on 1 January 1838 (see formannskapsdistrikt law). According to the 1835 census the municipality had a population of 4,513. On 1 January 1875, a small rural area of the town of Arendal was removed from the town and split between two neighboring municipalities: the western part (population: 52) was transferred to Øiestad Municipality and the eastern part (population: 22) was transferred to Østre Moland Municipality.

On 1 May 1878, Østre Moland Municipality was divided as follows:

- the southwestern district (population: 4,874) became the new Barbu Municipality
- the southeastern district (population: 2,320) became the new Tromøy Municipality
- the northern district (population: 2,524) continued as a smaller Østre Moland Municipality

On 1 July 1919, Austre Moland Municipality was divided as follows: the southern coastal district (population: 1,683) became the new Stokken Municipality and the northern district (population: 1,289) continued as a smaller Austre Moland Municipality. Also on that date, a small border area (population: 14) in Holt Municipality was transferred into Austre Moland Municipality. In 1936, a small area of Øyestad Municipality (population: 33) was transferred to Austre Moland Municipality. In 1944, a small area of Austre Moland Municipality (population: 44) was transferred into the town of Arendal.

During the 1960s, there were many municipal mergers across Norway due to the work of the Schei Committee. On 1 January 1962, Austre Moland Municipality was dissolved and the following areas were merged to form the new Moland Municipality:

- all of Austre Moland Municipality (population: 1,607)
- all of Flosta Municipality (population: 1,205)
- all of Stokken Municipality (population: 2,783)
- the Strengereid area of Tvedestrand Municipality (population: 375)

Later, on 1 January 1992, Moland Municipality (population: 8,148) was merged into the neighboring Arendal Municipality.

=== Name ===
The municipality (originally the parish) is named Østre Moland after the old Moland farm (Old Norse: Móðguland). The prefix østre (which means "eastern") was added to differentiate the place from Vestre Moland Municipality which was located a little further south along the coast of Norway. The first element of the name is derived from the river name Móðga, which can be linked with the Old Norse word móðigr which means "brave" or "courageous". The last element is land which means "land" or "district". The spelling of the prefix was later changed from østre to austre during the 20th century, but the meaning did not change.

=== Churches ===
The Church of Norway had one parish (sokn) within Austre Moland Municipality. At the time of the municipal dissolution, it was part of the Austre Moland prestegjeld and the Aust-Nedenes prosti (deanery) in the Diocese of Agder.

Churches in Austre Moland Municipality
Parish (sokn)	Church name	Location of the church	Year built
Austre Moland	Austre Moland Church	Brekka	1673

== Geography ==
The highest point in the municipality was the 225-metre (738 ft) tall mountain Skrattereidknuten, a tripoint between Austre Moland, Froland, and Holt municipalities. Holt Municipality was located to the north and east, Stokken Municipality was located to the southeast, Arendal Municipality was located to the south, Øyestad Municipality was located to the southwest, and Froland Municipality was located to the west.

== Government ==
While it existed, Austre Moland Municipality was responsible for primary education (through 10th grade), outpatient health services, senior citizen services, welfare and other social services, zoning, economic development, and municipal roads and utilities. The municipality was governed by a municipal council of directly elected representatives. The mayor was indirectly elected by a vote of the municipal council. The municipality was under the jurisdiction of the Nedenes District Court and the Agder Court of Appeal.

=== Municipal council ===
The municipal council (Heradsstyre) of Austre Moland Municipality was made up of 17 representatives that were elected to four year terms. The tables below show the historical composition of the council by political party.

Austre Moland heradsstyre 1959–1961
Party name (in Nynorsk)	Number of representatives
Labour Party (Arbeidarpartiet)	6
Conservative Party (Høgre)	2
Christian Democratic Party (Kristeleg Folkeparti)	3
Centre Party (Senterpartiet)	2
Liberal Party (Venstre)	4
Total number of members:	17
Note: On 1 January 1962, Austre Moland Municipality became part of Moland Municipality.

Austre Moland heradsstyre 1955–1959
Party name (in Nynorsk)	Number of representatives
Labour Party (Arbeidarpartiet)	7
Conservative Party (Høgre)	2
Christian Democratic Party (Kristeleg Folkeparti)	2
Farmers' Party (Bondepartiet)	2
Liberal Party (Venstre)	4
Total number of members:	17

Austre Moland heradsstyre 1951–1955
Party name (in Nynorsk)	Number of representatives
Labour Party (Arbeidarpartiet)	6
Conservative Party (Høgre)	2
Christian Democratic Party (Kristeleg Folkeparti)	2
Farmers' Party (Bondepartiet)	2
Liberal Party (Venstre)	4
Total number of members:	16

Austre Moland heradsstyre 1947–1951
Party name (in Nynorsk)	Number of representatives
Labour Party (Arbeidarpartiet)	5
Conservative Party (Høgre)	3
Farmers' Party (Bondepartiet)	2
Joint list of the Liberal Party (Venstre) and the Radical People's Party (Radikale Folkepartiet)	6
Total number of members:	16

Austre Moland heradsstyre 1945–1947
Party name (in Nynorsk)	Number of representatives
Labour Party (Arbeidarpartiet)	6
Conservative Party (Høgre)	2
Farmers' Party (Bondepartiet)	2
Joint list of the Liberal Party (Venstre) and the Radical People's Party (Radikale Folkepartiet)	6
Total number of members:	16

Austre Moland heradsstyre 1937–1941*
Party name (in Nynorsk)	Number of representatives
Labour Party (Arbeidarpartiet)	4
Conservative Party (Høgre)	4
Farmers' Party (Bondepartiet)	2
Liberal Party (Venstre)	6
Total number of members:	16
Note: Due to the German occupation of Norway during World War II, no elections were held for new municipal councils until after the war ended in 1945.

=== Mayors ===
The mayor (Nynorsk: ordførar) of Austre Moland Municipality was the political leader of the municipality and the chairperson of the municipal council. The following people have held this position:

- 1838–1839: Knut Stiansen Noddeland
- 1839–1841: Engelbrekt Fasland Hald
- 1842–1843: Rev. Johannes Sandberg
- 1844–1845: Fredrik Martinius Wold
- 1846–1847: Tellef Thorsen Myren
- 1848–1851: Christen Torjussen Staksnæs
- 1851–1853: Jens Johannessen Alve
- 1854–1855: Aanon J. Bie
- 1856–1857: Peder Jørgensen Fløistad
- 1858–1859: Aanon J. Bie
- 1859–1860: Stian Knutsen Tveiten
- 1860–1861: Aanon J. Bie
- 1862–1873: Christen Torjussen Staksnæs
- 1874–1875: Erik Gundersen Fløistad
- 1876–1878: O.B. Sørensen Bratteklev
- 1878–1895: Ivar Fløistad
- 1895–1901: Anton Aanonsen Salterød
- 1902–1904: Lars O. Skjulestad
- 1905–1907: Anton Aanonsen Salterød
- 1908–1922: Lars O. Skjulestad
- 1923–1929: Anders Noddeland
- 1939–1945: Torjus Lona
- 1945–1959: Anders Johnsen Tveite
- 1959–1961: Torstein Bråten (V)

== See also ==
- List of former municipalities of Norway
