= Strengereid =

Village in Arendal Municipality, Norway

- Village
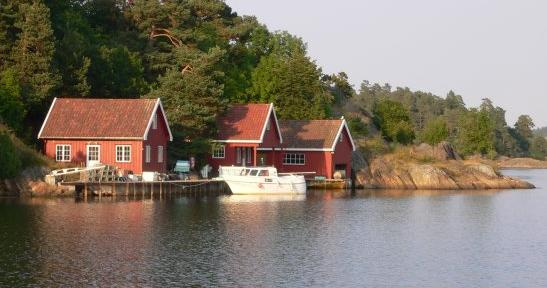
- View of the village
- Interactive map of Strengereid
- Coordinates: 58.5266°N 8.88854°E
- Country: Norway
- Region: Southern Norway
- County: Agder
- District: Østre Agder
- Municipality: Arendal Municipality
- Elevation: 6 m (20 ft)
- Time zone: UTC+01:00 (CET)
  - Summer (DST): UTC+02:00 (CEST)
- Post Code: 4810 Eydehavn

Strengereid is a village in Arendal Municipality in Agder county, Norway. It is located along the Norwegian County Road 410, about 3 kilometres (1.9 mi) northeast of the village of Eydehavn and just west of the island of Flosterøya. The village of Sagene lies about 2 kilometres (1.2 mi) to the northwest.

== History ==
Originally, Strengereid was part of the Tvedestrand Municipality, but on 1 January 1962, the Strengereid area was merged with the neighboring Flosta Municipality (west), Stokken Municipality (south), and Austre Moland Municipality (northwest) to form the new Moland Municipality. At that time Strengereid had 375 inhabitants. Then, on 1 January 1992, Moland Municipality was incorporated into Arendal Municipality.
