= Tvedestrand (town) =

- Town/City
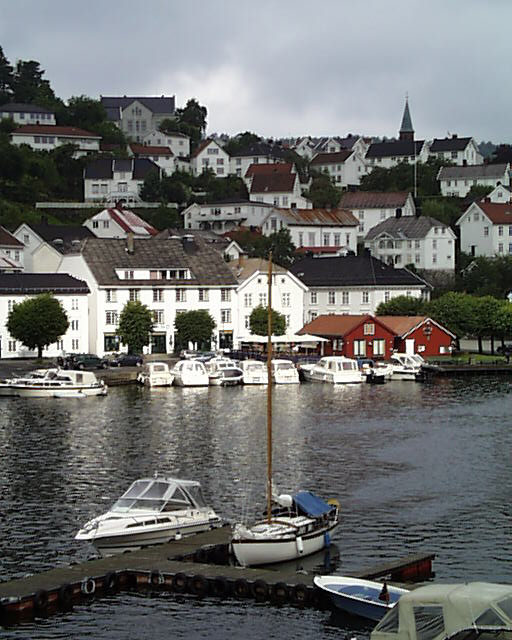
- View of the town
- Interactive map of Tvedestrand
- Coordinates: 58.62267°N 8.93106°E
- Country: Norway
- Region: Southern Norway
- County: Agder
- District: Østre Agder
- Municipality: Tvedestrand Municipality
- Established as
- Town (By): 1997

Area
  - Total: 2.39 km^{2} (0.92 sq mi)
- Elevation: 2 m (6.6 ft)

Population (2025)
  - Total: 2,891
  - Density: 1,210/km^{2} (3,100/sq mi)
- Time zone: UTC+01:00 (CET)
  - Summer (DST): UTC+02:00 (CEST)
- Post Code: 4900 Tvedestrand

Tvedestrand is a town and the administrative centre of Tvedestrand Municipality in Agder county, Norway. The town is located at the northern end of the Tvedestrandfjorden at the intersection of the Norwegian County Road 411 and Norwegian County Road 410. The Tvedestrand Church is located in the central part of the town. The 2.39-square-kilometre (590-acre) town has a population (2025) of 2,891 and a population density of 1,210 inhabitants per square kilometre (3,100/sq mi). In Norway, Tvedestrand is considered a by which can be translated as either a "town" or "city" in English.

== History ==
Tvedestrand had been a small coastal village with a small amount of industry when it became the main port of departure for the materials from the nearby Næs Jernverk (iron works) starting in 1738. In 1836, the port was declared to be a ladested and then on 1 January 1838, it became a town-municipality under the new civil municipality law (see formannskapsdistrikt law). The town status was granted to allow it a special license to export timber and iron from the harbour. On 1 January 1858, there was a boundary adjustment that added 70 more residents to the town of Tvedestrand from the neighboring rural Holt Municipality.

During the 1960s, there were many municipal mergers across Norway due to the work of the Schei Committee. On 1 January 1960, the neighboring Dypvåg Municipality (population: 1,805) and Holt Municipality (population: 3,759) were merged with the town of Tvedestrand (population: 868) to form a much larger Tvedestrand Municipality. Due to the merger, however, Tvedestrand lost its town status. A new law was passed in 1996 that allowed municipalities to declare urban areas as towns once again. In 1997, the municipality approved the town status for the former town of Tvedestrand.

=== Name ===
The first element is the genitive case of the name of the old Tveite farm (Old Norse: Þveitar) and the last element is strond which means "strand" or "beach". The name of the farm is the plural form of þveit which means "small farm".

== Government ==
In Norway, municipalities are the unit of local government. This means that cities and towns are simply designations for urban areas, but under current Norwegian law, they have no actual government authority. The town of Tvedestrand lies within Tvedestrand Municipality and is therefore governed by the municipal council of Tvedestrand Municipality.

== Media gallery ==
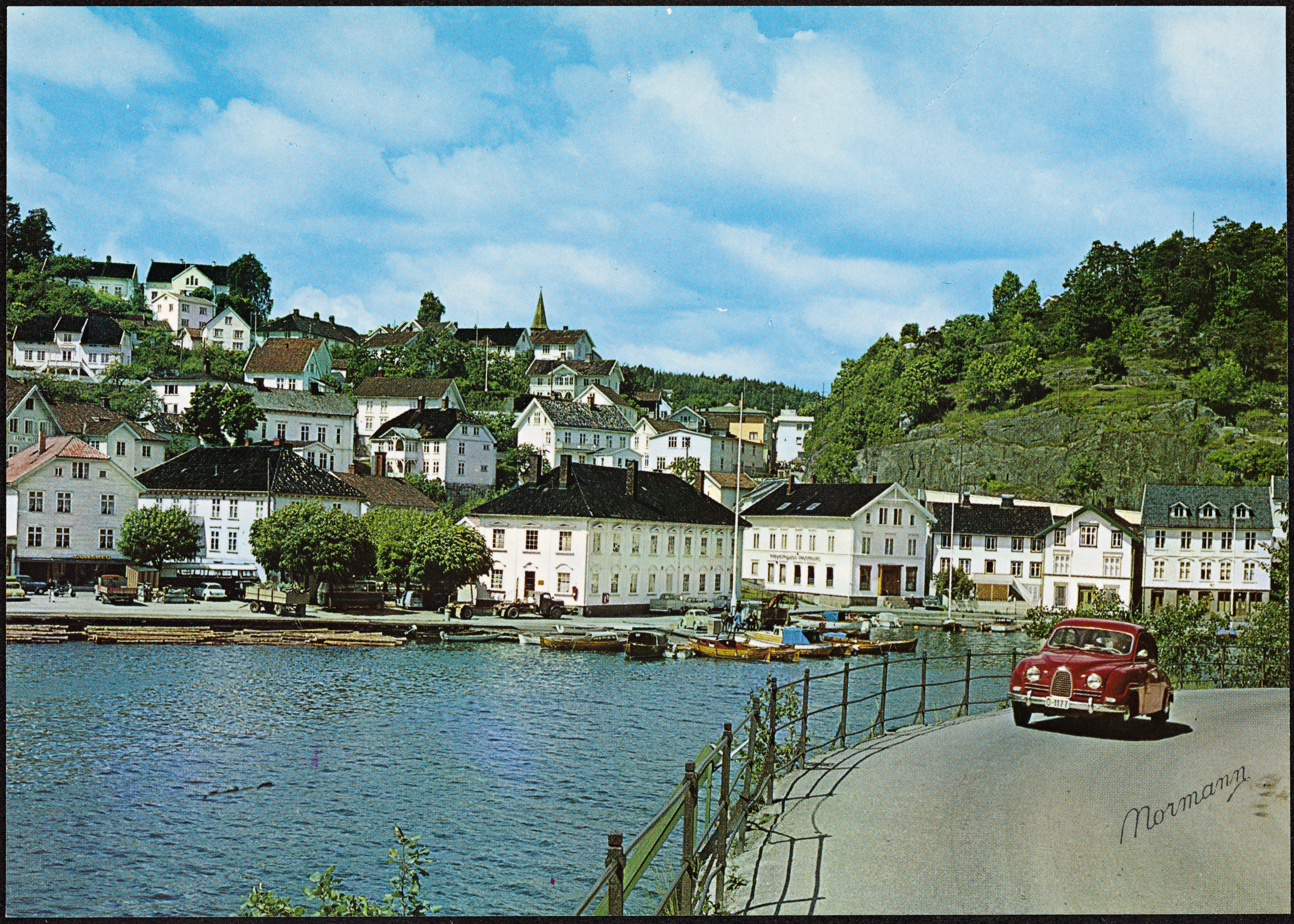

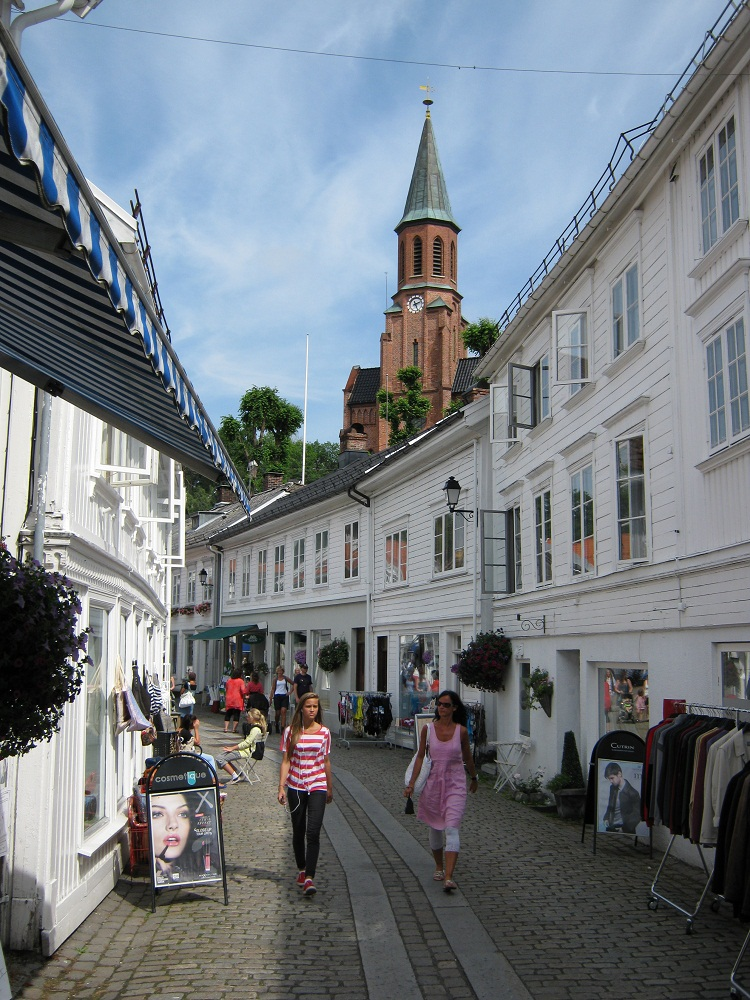

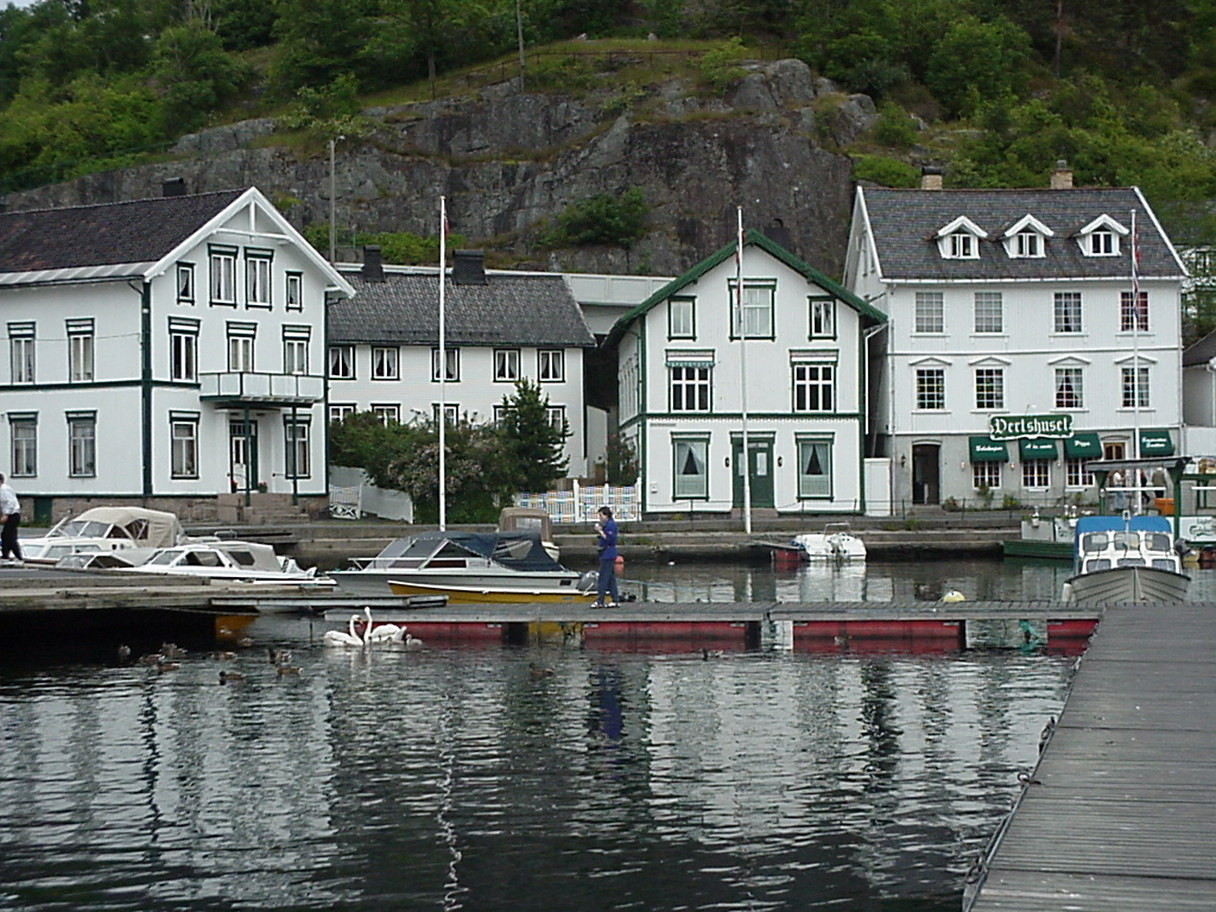

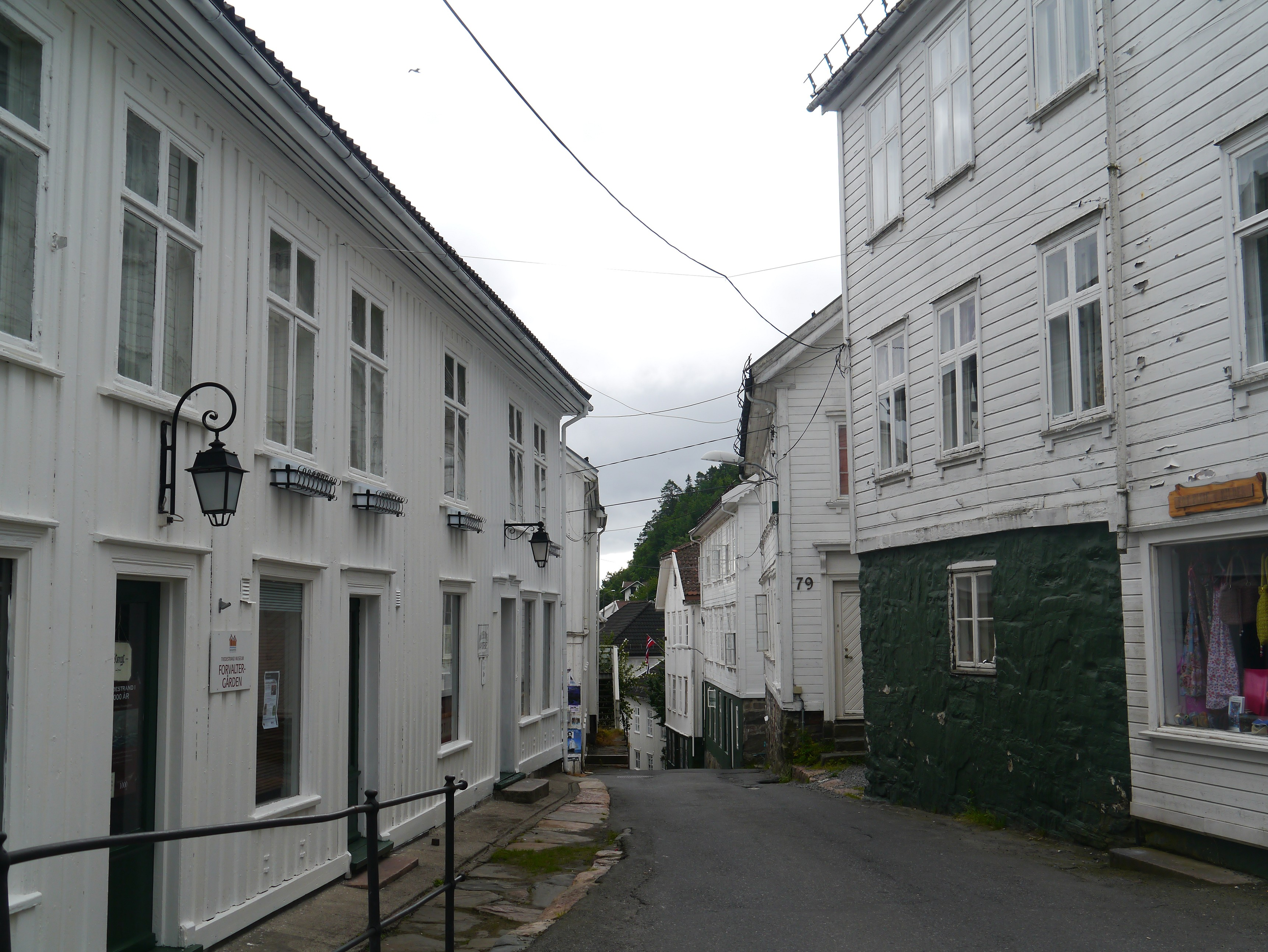

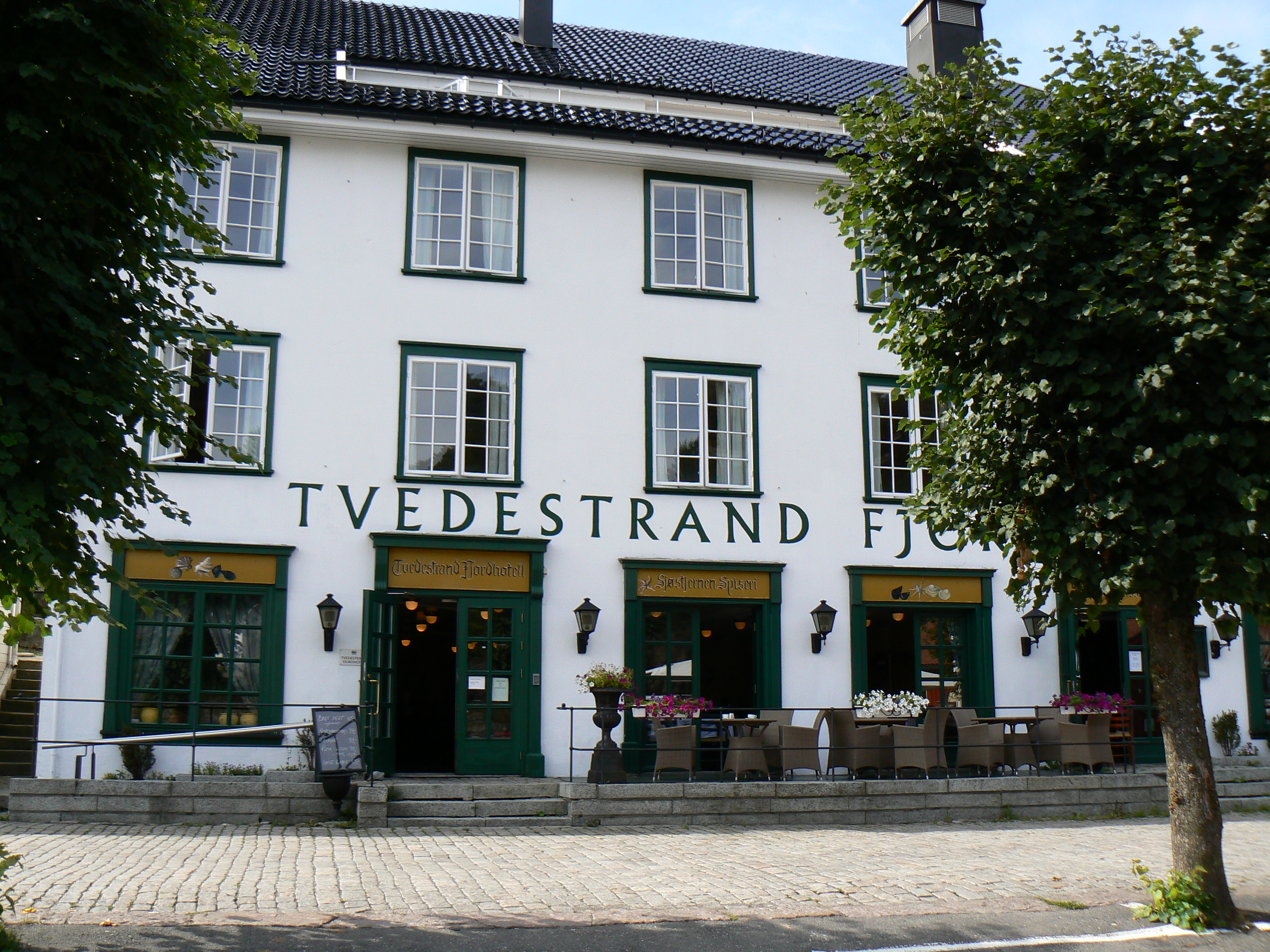

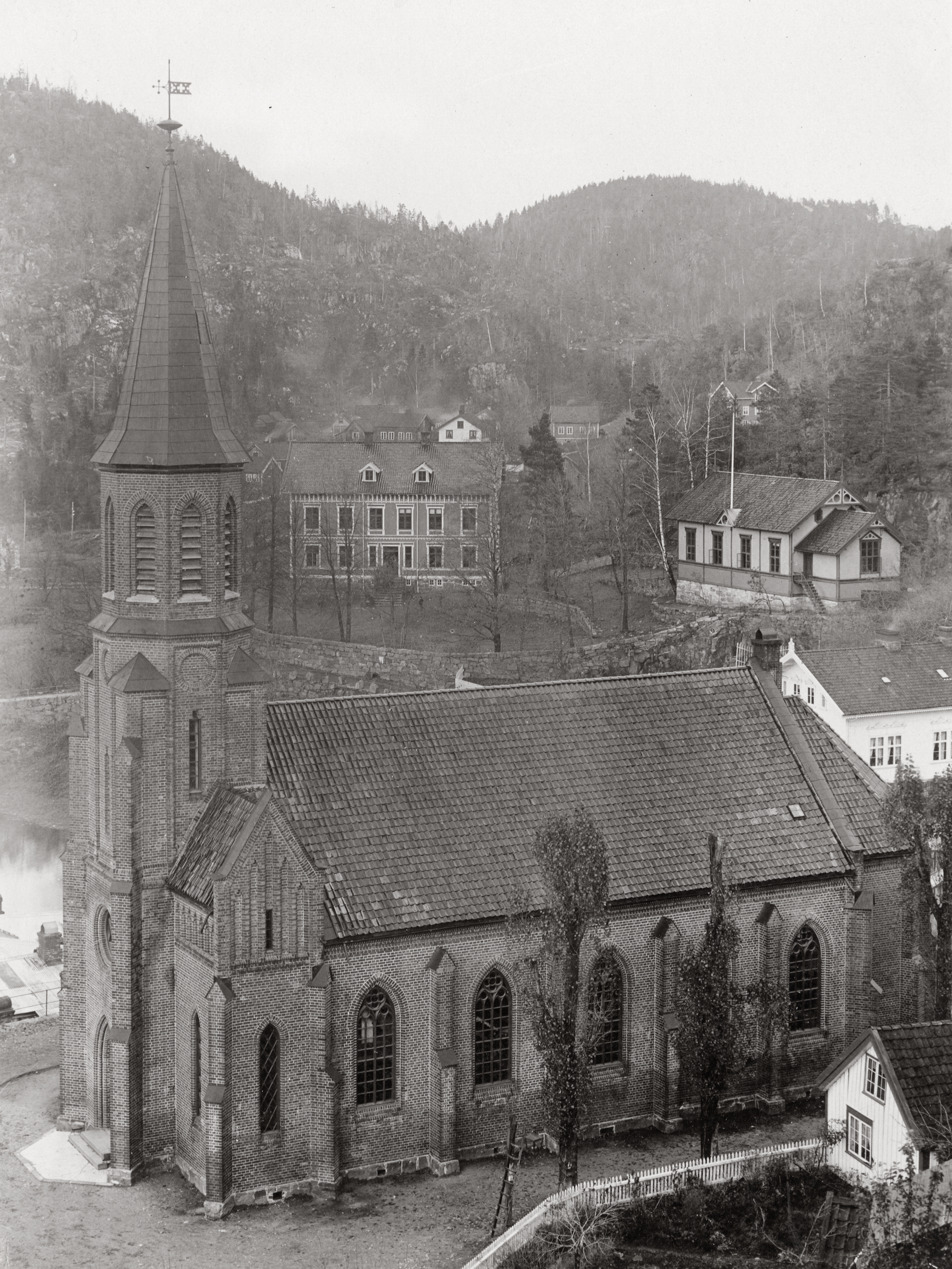

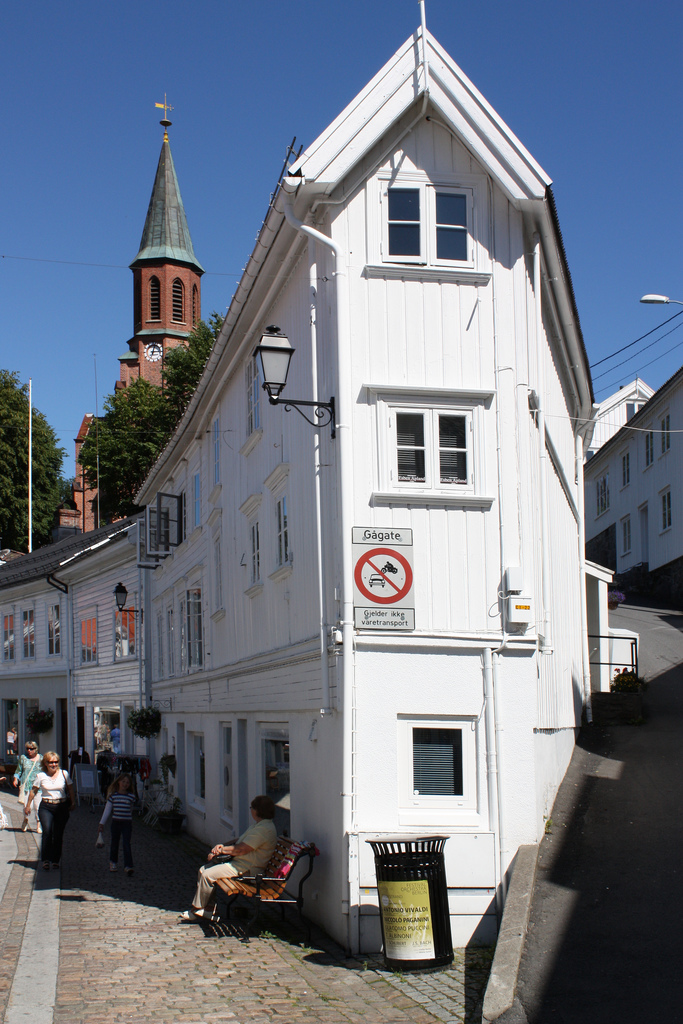

== See also ==
- List of towns and cities in Norway
