= Saltrød =

Village in Arendal Municipality, Norway

- Village
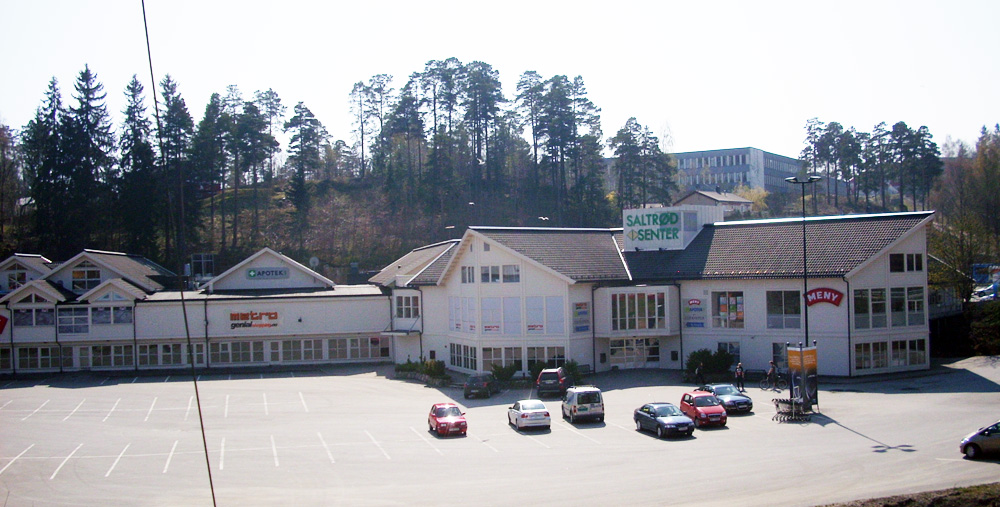
- View of the village mall
- Interactive map of Saltrød
- Coordinates: 58.48953°N 8.83651°E
- Country: Norway
- Region: Southern Norway
- County: Agder
- District: Østre Agder
- Municipality: Arendal Municipality
- Elevation: 50 m (160 ft)
- Time zone: UTC+01:00 (CET)
  - Summer (DST): UTC+02:00 (CEST)
- Post Code: 4815 Saltrød

Saltrød is a village in Arendal Municipality in Agder county, Norway. The village is located along the Norwegian County Road 410, about 5 kilometres (3.1 mi) northeast of the town of Arendal and about 2 kilometres (1.2 mi) southwest of the village of Eydehavn. The village lies along the Tromøysundet strait, looking across the water towards the island of Tromøy. Stokken Church is located in Saltrød.
