= Stokken Church =

Church in Agder, Norway

- Stokken kirke
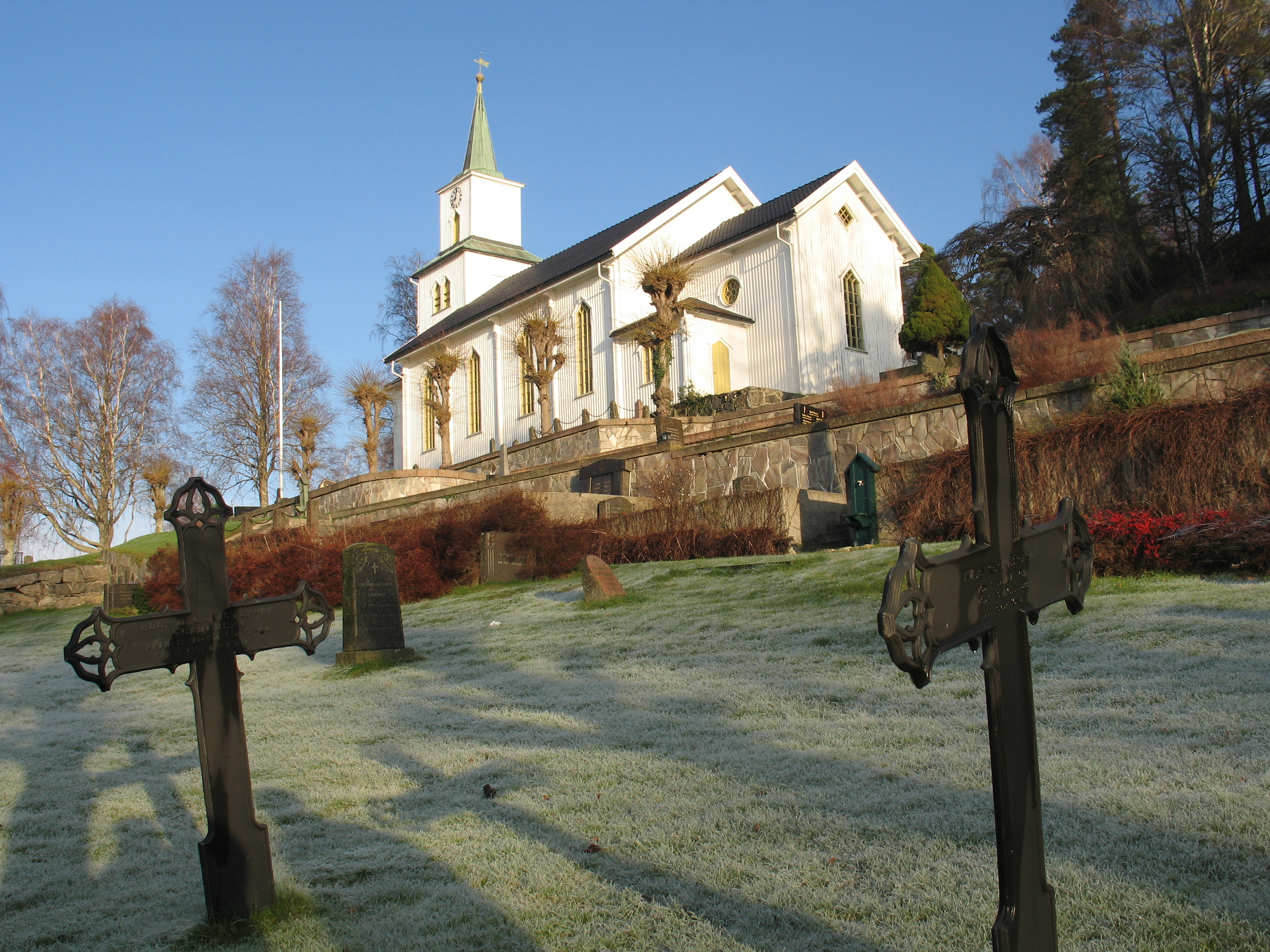
- View of the church
- Stokken Church
- 58.4919°N 08.8440°E
- Location: Arendal Municipality, Agder
- Country: Norway
- Denomination: Church of Norway
- Churchmanship: Evangelical Lutheran

History
- Status: Parish church
- Founded: 1879
- Consecrated: 13 Aug 1879

Architecture
- Functional status: Active
- Architect: J.C. Reuter
- Architectural type: Long church
- Completed: 1879 (147 years ago)

Specifications
- Capacity: 400
- Materials: Wood

Administration
- Diocese: Agder og Telemark
- Deanery: Arendal prosti
- Parish: Moland
- Norwegian Cultural Heritage Site
- Type: Church
- Status: Not protected
- ID: 85573

Stokken Church (Norwegian: Stokken kirke) is a parish church of the Church of Norway in Arendal Municipality in Agder county, Norway. It is located in the village of Saltrød. It is one of the churches for the Moland parish which is part of the Arendal prosti (deanery) in the Diocese of Agder og Telemark. The white, wooden church was built in a long church design in 1878 using plans drawn up by the architect Johan Christoff Friedrich Reuter. The church seats about 400 people.

== History ==
The church was originally built as a chapel of ease for the Stokken congregation of the Austre Moland parish. The timber-framed church stands on a slope at Stuenes. It was designed by Johan Christoff Friedrich Reuter and the builder Carl Svendsen was the lead builder. The church was consecrated on 13 August 1879.

The altarpiece, depicting Jesus in the Garden of Gethsemane, was painted by Hedevig Lund for Austre Moland Church in 1869, but the work was not accepted by the congregation at the time. Some years later, it was given to the new church in Stokken. The work needed to have a new piece added to it to function as an altarpiece.

In 1929, the master painter Emil Rummelhoff decorated the church's gallery with a frieze, with heads of grain and grapes to symbolize the Eucharist. At the same time, he painted the entire interior of the church, and for the restoration for the church's centennial in 1979 the Norwegian Directorate for Cultural Heritage recommended that Rummelhoff's design be retained.

The church bells were cast at the Olsen Nauen Bell Foundry in 1879. The organ has nine stops and was produced by Josef Hilmar Jørgensen in 1928.

The plans for Stokken Church were later used to build Færvik Church and Bjorbekk Church.

== Media gallery ==
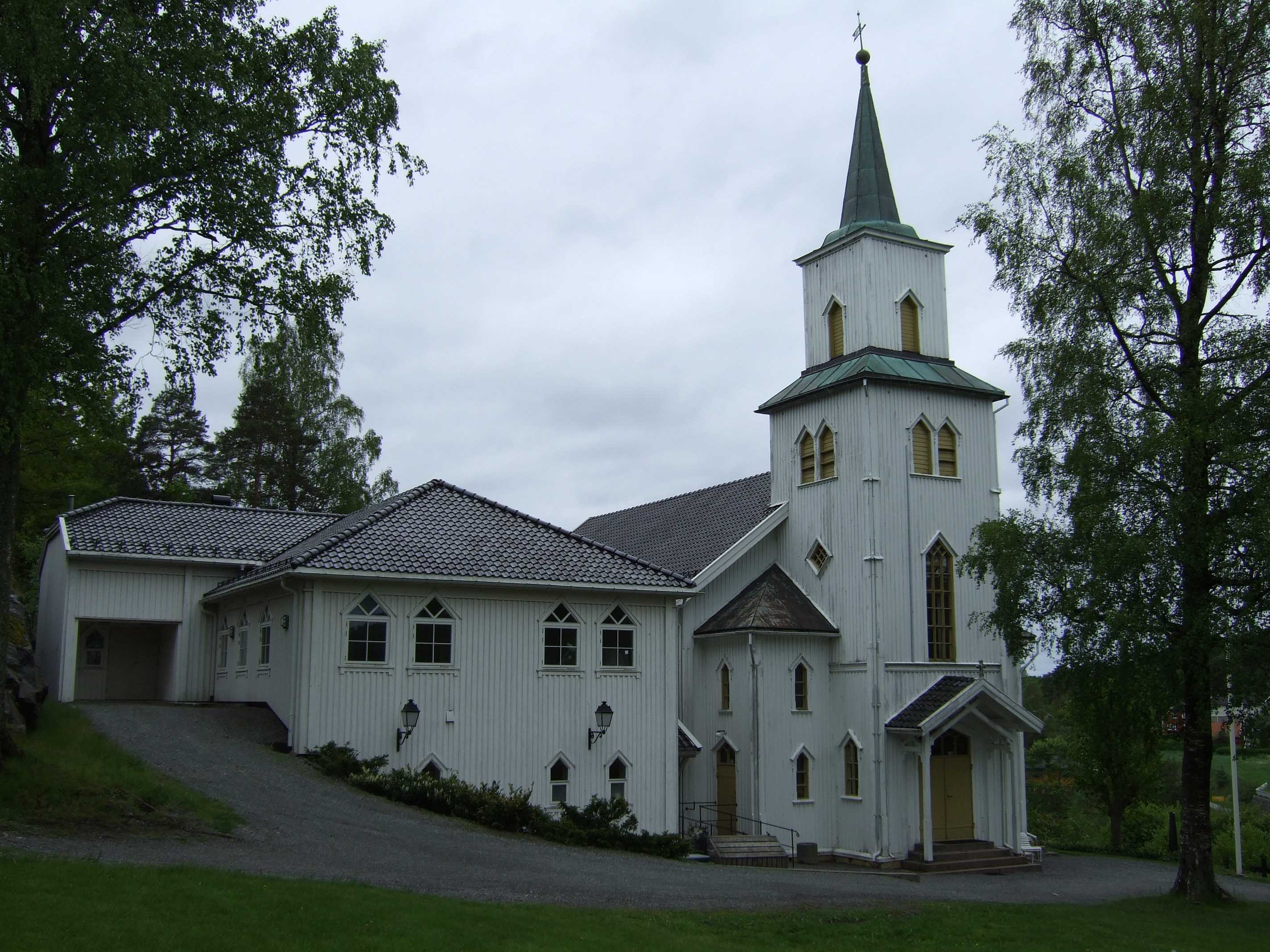

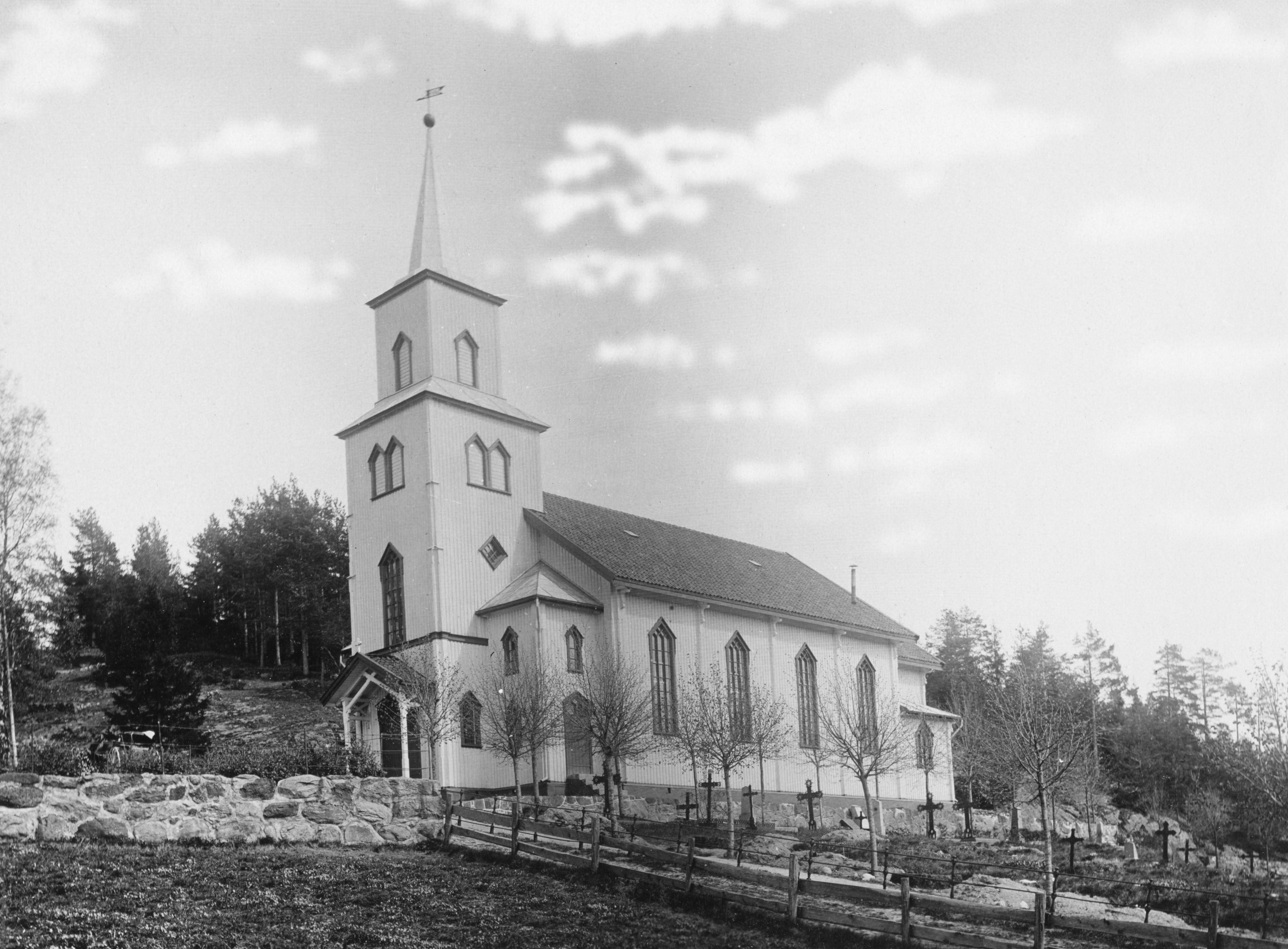

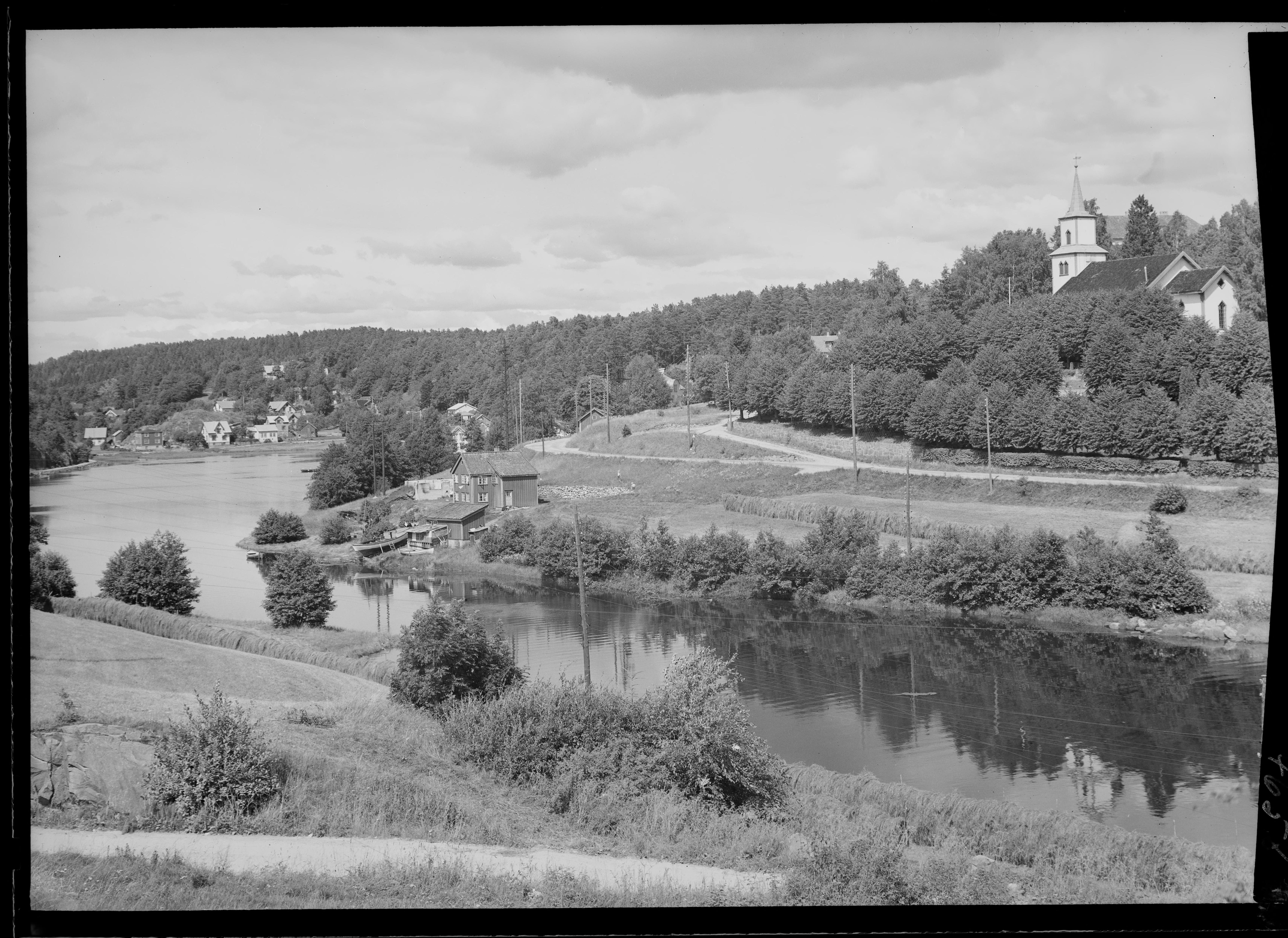

== See also ==
- List of churches in Agder og Telemark
