= Tverrdalsøya =

Lake in Agder, Norway

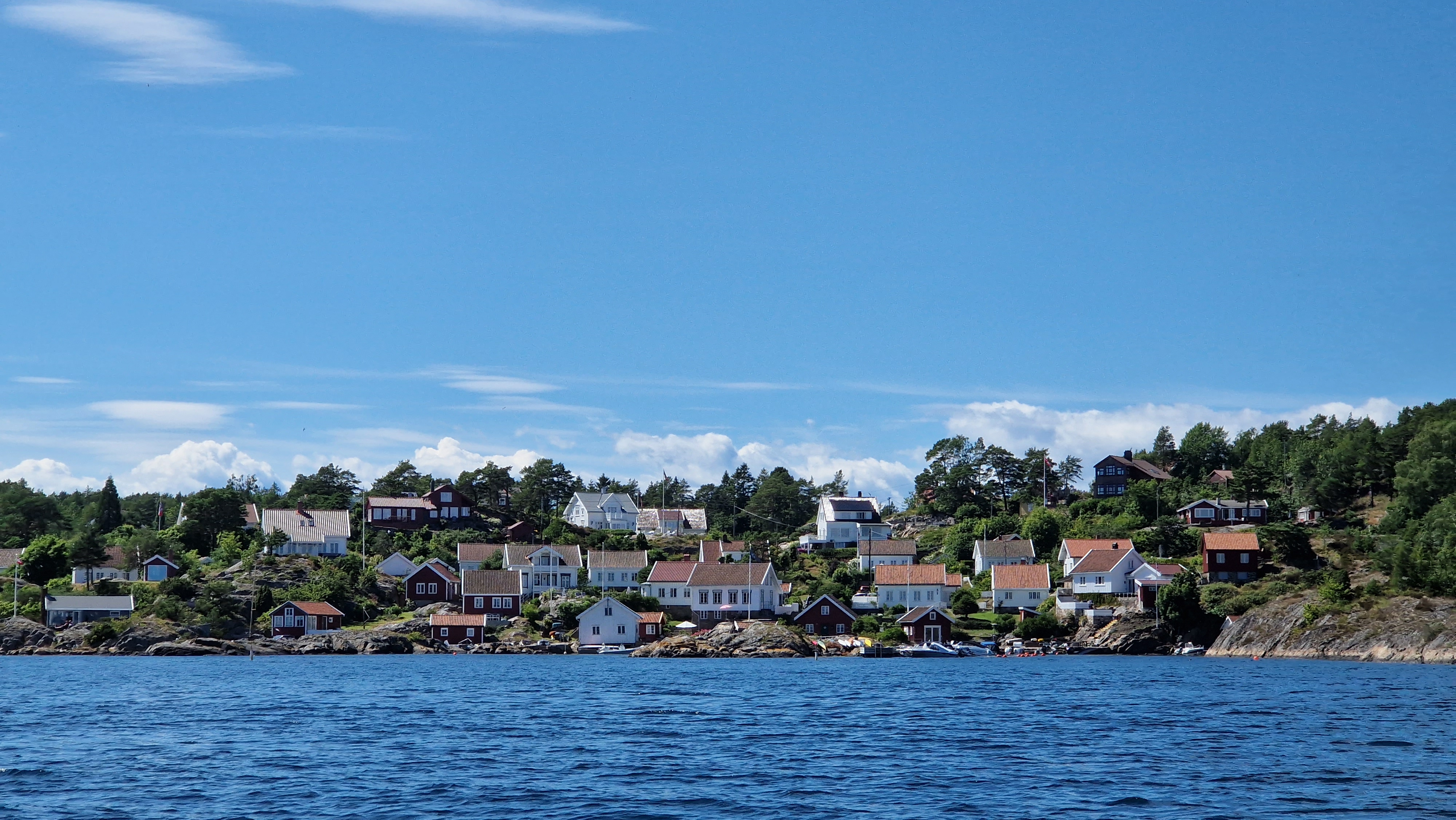
- Interactive map of the island

Geography
- Location: Agder, Norway
- Coordinates: 58.57726°N 8.98102°E
- Area: 3.4 km^{2} (1.3 sq mi)
- Length: 4 km (2.5 mi)
- Width: 2 km (1.2 mi)
- Highest elevation: 70 m (230 ft)
- Highest point: Bronheiene

Administration
- Norway
- County: Agder
- Municipality: Arendal Municipality

Tverrdalsøya is an island in Arendal Municipality in Agder county, Norway. The 3.4-square-kilometre (1.3 sq mi) island lies between the Oksefjorden, Eikelandsfjorden, and Kilsundet straits just off the mainland coast at the entrance to the Tvedestrandsfjorden which leads north to the town of Tvedestrand. The island of Flosterøya lies immediately to the south and the island of Borøya lies immediately to the east. The main population centre on the island is the village of Kilsund at the southern end of the island.

Historically, the island was a part of the old Dybvaag Municipality until 1902 when it was made a part of the new Flosta Municipality. In 1962, it became a part of the new Moland Municipality and then in 1992 it became part of Arendal Municipality.

== See also ==
- List of islands of Norway
