= Eydehavn =

Village in Arendal Municipality, Norway

- Village
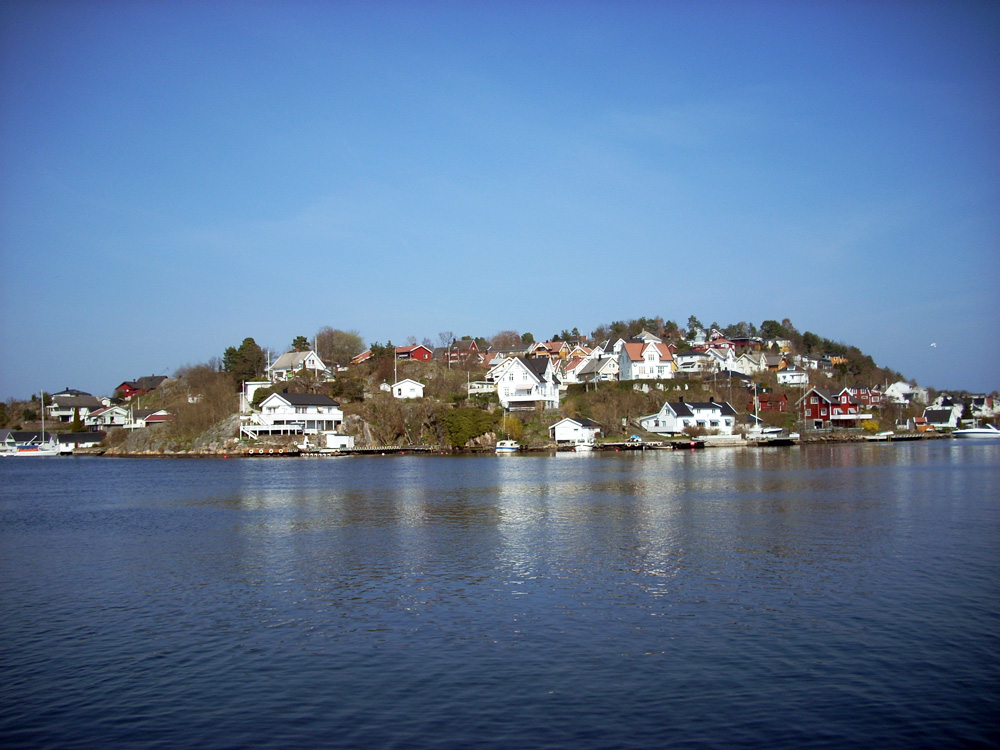
- View of the village
- Interactive map of Eydehavn
- Coordinates: 58.4998°N 08.8644°E
- Country: Norway
- Region: Southern Norway
- County: Agder
- District: Østre Agder
- Municipality: Arendal Municipality
- Elevation: 18 m (59 ft)
- Time zone: UTC+01:00 (CET)
  - Summer (DST): UTC+02:00 (CEST)
- Post Code: 4810 Eydehavn

Eydehavn is a village in Arendal Municipality in Agder county, Norway. The village is located about 10 kilometres (6.2 mi) northeast of the centre of the town of Arendal, about 2 kilometres (1.2 mi) northeast of the village of Saltrød, about 2 kilometres (1.2 mi) south of the village of Strengereid, and just across the Tromøysundet strait from Kongshavn on the island of Tromøya. The village is named after Sam Eyde, the Norwegian engineer and industrialist. The local sports team is called IL Sørfjell and have teen teams in a variety of sports. Eydehavn has about 1,100 residents as of 2015.

== History ==
Eydehavn grew up around a smelting factory and an aluminium factory starting around 1912. The village became quite the industrial hub for the area. In 1919, when the new Stokken Municipality was created, the village of Eydehavn was chosen to be the administrative centre. In 1962, Stokken Municipality was merged with some other areas and together they formed the new Moland Municipality. Eydehavn was then chosen to be the administrative centre of Moland Municipality as well. In 1992, Moland Municipality was incorporated into an enlarged Arendal Municipality.
