= Ahsham =

Ahsham or Ehsham (Persian: احشام) may refer to:

- Ahsham (film)
- Ahsham (Mughal Infantry)
- Ehsham, Fars
- Ahsham-e Ahmad (disambiguation)
- Ahsham-e Ali Ahmad Kheyari
- Ahsham-e Bakhshui
- Ahsham-e Hajj Khurshid
- Ahsham-e Hasan
- Ahsham-e Jamal
- Ahsham-e Khodadad
- Ahsham Khosrow Khan
- Ahsham-e Kohneh
- Ahsham-e Manu Ahmadi
- Ahsham-e Mohammad Heydar
- Ahsham-e Ommid Ali
- Ahsham Qaedha
- Ahsham-e Sartal
- Ahsham-e Seyyed
- Ahsham-e Sheykhi
- Ahsham-e Zaer Hoseyn-e Ghazanfari
- Ahsham-e Zar-e Mohammad
- Ahsham-e Muhammad Ahsham Ijaz
