= Gurak, Iran (disambiguation) =

Gurak, Iran is a village in Fars Province, Iran.

Gurak (Persian: گورك) may also refer to:

- Gurak-e Dezhgah
- Gurak-e Do
- Gurak-e Kalleh Bandi
- Gurak-e Khvorshidi
- Gurak-e Mohammad Rahimi
- Gurak-e Sadat
- Gurak-e Soleymani

== See also ==
- Ghurak, Iran (disambiguation)
