= Barbu =

Barbu may refer to:

== People ==
- Barbu (name), a list of people with the name and surname Barbu
- Alejandro Barbudo Lorenzo, nicknamed Barbu, Spanish footballer

== Places ==
- Barbu, Iran, a village in the Bushehr Province of Iran
- Barbu, Norway, a neighborhood in the city of Arendal in Agder county, Norway
- Barbu Church, a church in the city of Arendal in Norway
- Barbu Municipality, a former municipality in the old Nedenes county, Norway

== Other ==
- Barbu (card game), a card game originating in France
- Barbu (Polydactylus virginicus), a species of threadfin fish from the West Atlantic
