= Eshkali =

Eshkali (Persian: اشكالي) may refer to:

- Eshkali, Bushehr, a village in Tangestan County
  - Eshkali Avaz Hoseyn, a neighborhood in the village
  - Eshkali Mohammad Hajji, a neighborhood in the village
  - Eshkali Seyyedi, a neighborhood in the village
  - Eshkali Zayer Hoseyn, a neighborhood in the village
- Eshkali, Mazandaran
