= Khardan =

Khardan (Persian: خاردان) may refer to the following villages in Iran:

- Khardan, Chaharmahal and Bakhtiari
- Khardan, Baft, in Baft County of Kerman Province
- Khardan, Jiroft, in Jiroft County of Kerman Province
- Khardan-e Do, in Bardsir County of Kerman Province

== See also ==
- Hardan (disambiguation)
