= Vahdatabad =

Vahdatabad (Persian: وحدت اباد) may refer to:

- Vahdatabad, Bushehr
- Vahdatabad, Fars
- Vahdatabad, Ilam
- Vahdatabad, Kerman
- Vahdatabad, Sirjan, Kerman Province
- Vahdatabad, Kohgiluyeh and Boyer-Ahmad
- Vahdatabad-e Mugarmun, Kohgiluyeh and Boyer-Ahmad Province
