= Ghurak, Iran =

Ghurak (Persian: غورك), also rendered as Qurak, may refer to:

- Ghurak-e Olya
- Ghurak-e Sofla
- Ghurak-e Vosta

== See also ==
- Gurak, Iran (disambiguation)
