= Gulaki =

Gulaki (Persian: گولكي) may refer to:

- Gulaki, Bushehr
- Gulaki, Semnan
