= Leylak =

Leylak لیلک
- village
- Location within Iran
- Coordinates: 28°53′06″N 51°02′14″E
- Country: Iran
- Province: Bushehr
- County: Tangestan
- Bakhsh: Delvar
- Rural District: Delvar

Population (2006)
  - Total: 543
- Time zone: UTC+3:30 (IRST)
  - Summer (DST): UTC+4:30 (IRDT)

Leylak (Persian: لیلک, also Romanized as Leylak and Līlak; also known as Līlag, Persian: لیلگ) is a village in Delvar Rural District, Delvar District, Tangestan County, Bushehr Province, Iran. At the 2006 census, its population was 543, in 113 families.
