= Bashi =

Bashi باشي
- Village
- Location within Iran
- Coordinates: 28°40′58″N 51°04′41″E
- Country: Iran
- Province: Bushehr
- County: Tangestan
- Bakhsh: Delvar
- Rural District: Delvar

Population (2006)
  - Total: 708
- Time zone: UTC+3:30 (IRST)
  - Summer (DST): UTC+4:30 (IRDT)

Bashi (Persian: باشي, also Romanized as Bāshī) is a village in Delvar Rural District, Delvar District, Tangestan County, Bushehr Province, Iran. At the 2006 census, its population was 708, in 166 families.
