= Mokhdan =

Mokhdan or Makhdan (Persian: مخدان) may refer to the following places in Iran:

- Mokhdan, Deyr
- Mokhdan, Bord Khun, Deyr County
- Makhdan, Tangestan
