= Gavi =

Gavi or GAVI may refer to:

- GAVI (originally Global Alliance for Vaccines and Immunization), an international partnership that promotes vaccination

== Places ==
- Gavi (island), a small Italian island in the Mediterranean Sea
- Gavi, Bushehr, a village in Bushehr province, Iran
- Gavi, Kerala, a village in Pathanamthitta, in Kerala state, India
- Gavi, Piedmont, a municipality in the province of Alessandria in the northwestern Italian region Piedmont
- Gavi, Sistan and Baluchestan, a village in Sistan and Baluchestan province, Iran
- Gavi-ye Sofla, a village in South Khorasan province, Iran

== People ==
- Gavi (footballer) (Pablo Martín Páez Gavira; born 2004), Spanish association footballer

== Other ==
- Cortese di Gavi, a wine appellation, produced in the area of the Piemontese town above, often called simply Gavi
- Gavi Gangadhareshwara Temple, an Indian rock-cut architecture in Bangalore
- Gavi Dam in Pathanamthitta district of Kerala, India
