= Mohammad Ameri =

Village in Bushehr province, Iran

Mohammad Ameri Persian: محمدعامري
- Village
- Location within Iran
- Coordinates: 28°43′38″N 51°04′26″E
- Country: Iran
- Province: Bushehr
- County: Tangestan
- District: Delvar
- Rural District: Delvar

Population (2016)
  - Total: 2,499
- Time zone: UTC+3:30 (IRST)

Mohammad Ameri (Persian: محمدعامري) (Note: Also romanized as Moḩammad ‘Āmerī; also known as Madumari and Moḩammad ‘Omari) is a village in Delvar Rural District of Delvar District (Note: Formerly Saheli District) in Tangestan County, Bushehr province, Iran.

== Demographics ==
=== Population ===
At the time of the 2006 National Census, the village's population was 2,040 in 454 households. The following census in 2011 counted 2,293 people in 564 households. The 2016 census measured the population of the village as 2,499 people in 680 households. It was the most populous village in its rural district.
