= Bu ol Kheyr =

Village in Bushehr province, Iran

Bu ol Kheyr Persian: بوالخير
- Village
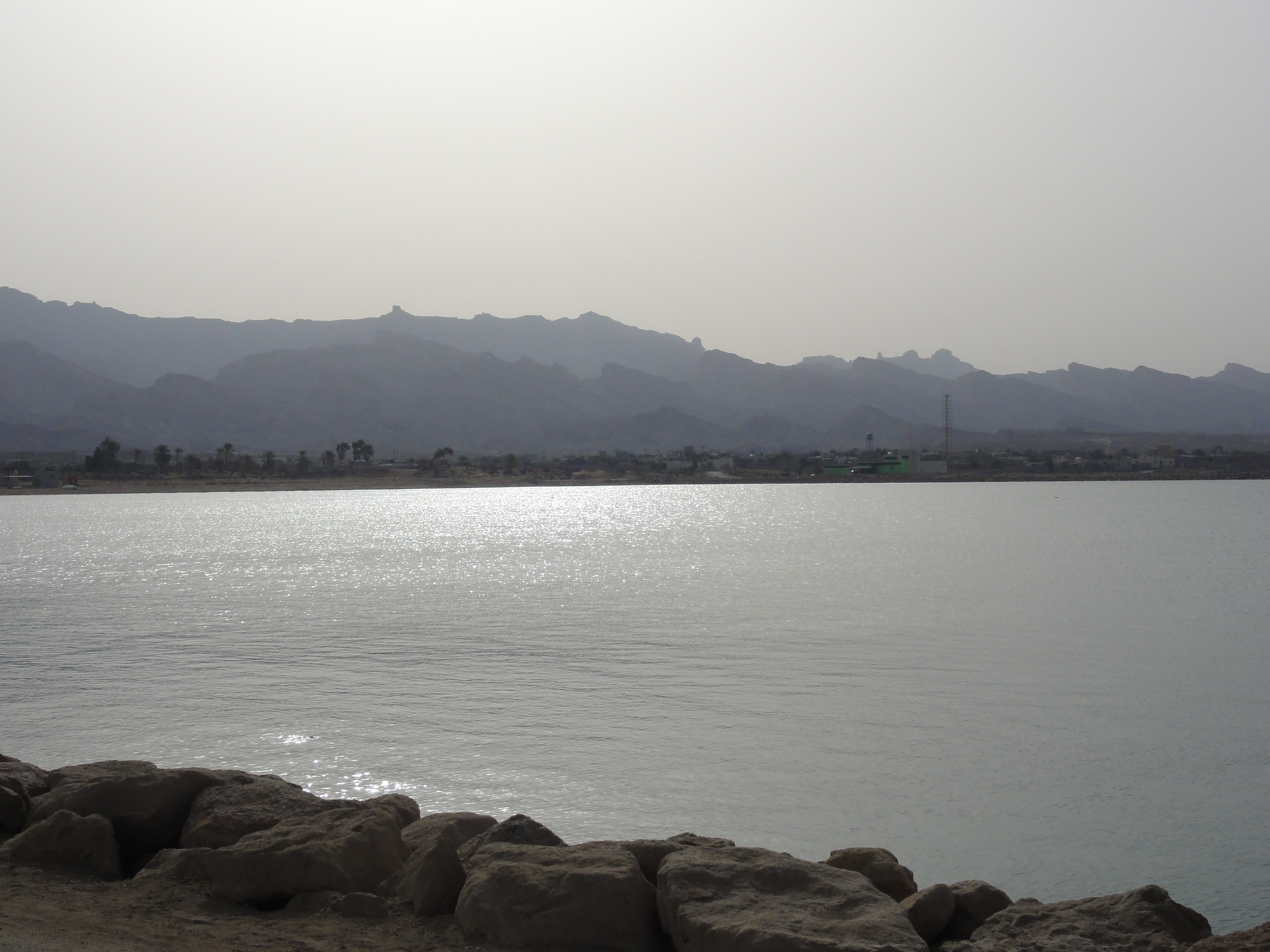

- Location within Iran
- Coordinates: 28°31′49″N 51°05′42″E
- Country: Iran
- Province: Bushehr
- County: Tangestan
- District: Delvar
- Rural District: Bu ol Kheyr

Population (2016)
  - Total: 2,252
- Time zone: UTC+3:30 (IRST)

Bu ol Kheyr (Persian: بوالخير) (Note: Also romanized as Bū al Kheyr and Bū ol Kheyr; also known as Bol Kheyr, Bolkheir, Bolkheyr, Bowlkhayr, Bū al Kheyz, and Bū‘l Khair) is a village in, and the capital of, Bu ol Kheyr Rural District in Delvar District (Note: Formerly Saheli District) of Tangestan County, Bushehr province, Iran.

== Demographics ==
=== Population ===
At the time of the 2006 National Census, the village's population was 1,940 in 466 households. The following census in 2011 counted 1,978 people in 520 households. The 2016 census measured the population of the village as 2,252 people in 674 households.
