= Karri, Iran =

Village in Bushehr province, Iran

Karri Persian: كري
- Village
- Location within Iran
- Coordinates: 28°25′05″N 51°08′26″E
- Country: Iran
- Province: Bushehr
- County: Tangestan
- District: Delvar
- Rural District: Bu ol Kheyr

Population (2016)
  - Total: 704
- Time zone: UTC+3:30 (IRST)

Karri (Persian: كري) (Note: Also romanized as Kari, Karrī, and Korrī) is a village in Bu ol Kheyr Rural District of Delvar District (Note: Formerly Saheli District) in Tangestan County, Bushehr province, Iran.

== Demographics ==
=== Population ===
At the time of the 2006 National Census, the village's population was 641 in 153 households. The following census in 2011 counted 685 people in 183 households. The 2016 census measured the population of the village as 704 people in 203 households.
