= Ameri, Tangestan =

Village in Bushehr province, Iran

Ameri Persian: عامري
- Village
- Location within Iran
- Coordinates: 28°30′35″N 51°06′03″E
- Country: Iran
- Province: Bushehr
- County: Tangestan
- District: Delvar
- Rural District: Bu ol Kheyr

Population (2016)
  - Total: 2,581
- Time zone: UTC+3:30 (IRST)

Ameri (Persian: عامري) (Note: Also romanized as ‘Āmerī) is a village in Bu ol Kheyr Rural District of Delvar District (Note: Formerly Saheli District) in Tangestan County, Bushehr province, Iran.

== Demographics ==
=== Population ===
At the time of the 2006 National Census, the village's population was 1,914 in 447 households. The following census in 2011 counted 2,200 people in 573 households. The 2016 census measured the population of the village as 2,581 people in 742 households. It was the most populous village in its rural district.
