= Hussein Ali =

Hussein Ali may refer to:

- Hussein Ali Al-Saedi (born 1996), Iraqi footballer
- Hussein Ali (footballer, born 1982), Egyptian footballer
- Hussein Ali (judoka) (born 1990), Iraqi judoka
- Hussein Ali (footballer, born 2002), Iraqi football right-back
- Husain Ali (born 1981), Bahraini footballer
- Hussain Ali Baba (born 1982), Bahraini footballer
- Hoseyn Ali, Bushehr, village in IRan
- Hussain Ali, Maldivian singer and military officer
- Hossain Ali, Bangladeshi cricketer
