= Hardan =

Hardan can refer to:

- Hardan, Chaharmahal and Bakhtiari, a village in Iran
- Hardan (Iraq), a village in Iraq
- Assaad Hardan (1951), Lebanese politician and the leader of the Syrian Social Nationalist Party in Lebanon
- Mohammed Al-Hardan, Bahreini footballer
- Hardan al-Tikriti (1925-1971), senior Iraqi Air Force commander and politician

== See also ==
- Khardan (disambiguation)
