= Khorshidi =

Khorshidi may refer to

- Khorshidi dynasty in Iran (c.1184–1597)
- Alireza Khorshidi (born 1952), Iranian football forward
- Gurak-e Khvorshidi, a village in Iran
