= Shamshiri, Bushehr =

Neighborhood in Bushehr province, Iran

Shamshiri Persian: شمشيري
- Neighborhood
- Location within Iran
- Coordinates: 28°55′12″N 51°08′28″E
- Country: Iran
- Province: Bushehr
- County: Tangestan
- District: Central
- Rural District: Baghak
- Village: Baghak-e Jonubi

Population (2006)
  - Total: 122
- Time zone: UTC+3:30 (IRST)

Shamshiri (Persian: شمشيري) is a neighborhood in the village of Baghak-e Jonubi in Baghak Rural District of the Central District in Tangestan County, Bushehr province, Iran.

== Demographics ==
=== Population ===
At the time of the 2006 National Census, Shamshiri's population was 122 in 26 households, when it was a village in Baghak Rural District.

== History ==
In 2010, the villages of Ali Shams ol Din, Bagh-e Salem-e Jonubi, Bagh-e Salem-e Shomali, Deh-e Now, Deh Kohneh, Jovey, Mal Barik, Rameh Char, Shamshiri, and Tokhmari merged to form the village of Baghak-e Jonubi.
