= Berikan =

Berikan بريكان
- Village
- Location within Iran
- Coordinates: 28°17′21″N 51°14′07″E
- Country: Iran
- Province: Bushehr
- County: Tangestan
- Bakhsh: Delvar
- Rural District: Bu ol Kheyr

Population (2006)
  - Total: 218
- Time zone: UTC+3:30 (IRST)
  - Summer (DST): UTC+4:30 (IRDT)

Berikan (Persian: بريكان, also Romanized as Berīkān and Barīkān; also known as Bārīku) is a village in Bu ol Kheyr Rural District, Delvar District, Tangestan County, Bushehr Province, Iran. At the 2006 census, its population was 218, in 58 families.
