= Deh-e Ebrahim =

Ebrahim, Iran or Deh-e Ebrahim or Deh Ebrahim (Persian: ده ابراهيم) may refer to:

- Ebrahim, Bushehr
- Deh-e Ebrahim, Khuzestan
- Deh-e, Kohgiluyeh and Boyer-Ahmad
- Deh-e Ebrahim, Sistan and Baluchestan
