= Gurak-e Dezhgah =

Gurak-e Dezhgah گورك دژگاه
- Village
- Location within Iran
- Coordinates: 28°55′48″N 51°02′19″E
- Country: Iran
- Province: Bushehr
- County: Tangestan
- Bakhsh: Delvar
- Rural District: Delvar

Population (2006)
  - Total: 433
- Time zone: UTC+3:30 (IRST)
  - Summer (DST): UTC+4:30 (IRDT)

Gurak-e Dezhgah (Persian: گورك دژگاه, also Romanized as Gūrak-e Dezhgāh; also known as Dezh Gāh and Dezhgāh) is a village in Delvar Rural District, Delvar District, Tangestan County, Bushehr Province, Iran. At the 2006 census, its population was 433, in 106 families.
