= Chah Talekh-e Shomali =

Village in Bushehr province, Iran

Chah Talekh-e Shomali Persian: چاه تلخ شمالي
- Village
- Location within Iran
- Coordinates: 28°51′09″N 51°02′42″E
- Country: Iran
- Province: Bushehr
- County: Tangestan
- District: Delvar
- Rural District: Delvar

Population (2016)
  - Total: 844
- Time zone: UTC+3:30 (IRST)

Chah Talekh-e Shomali (Persian: چاه تلخ شمالي) is a village in Delvar Rural District of Delvar District (Note: Formerly Saheli District) in Tangestan County, Bushehr province, Iran.

== Demographics ==
=== Population ===
At the time of the 2006 National Census, the village's population was 683 in 160 households. The following census in 2011 counted 752 people in 212 households. The 2016 census measured the population of the village as 844 people in 241 households.
