= Bagh-e Salem-e Shomali =

Neighborhood in Bushehr province, Iran

Bagh-e Salem-e Shomali Persian: باغ سالم شمالي
- Neighborhood
- Country: Iran
- Province: Bushehr
- County: Tangestan
- District: Central
- Rural District: Baghak
- Village: Baghak-e Jonubi

Population (2006)
  - Total: 30
- Time zone: UTC+3:30 (IRST)

Bagh-e Salem-e Shomali (Persian: باغ سالم شمالي) (Note: Also romanized as Bāgh-e Sālem-e Shomālī; also known as Bāgh-e Sālem) is a neighborhood in the village of Baghak-e Jonubi in Baghak Rural District of the Central District in Tangestan County, Bushehr province, Iran.

== Demographics ==
=== Population ===
At the time of the 2006 National Census, Bagh-e Salem-e Shomali's population was 30 in 8 households, when it was a village in Baghak Rural District.

== History ==
In 2010, the villages of Ali Shams ol Din, Bagh-e Salem-e Jonubi, Bagh-e Salem-e Shomali, Deh-e Now, Deh Kohneh, Jovey, Mal Barik, Rameh Char, Shamshiri, and Tokhmari merged to form the village of Baghak-e Jonubi.
