= Pahlavan Koshi =

Village in Bushehr province, Iran

Pahlavan Koshi Persian: پهلوانكشي
- Village
- Location within Iran
- Coordinates: 28°54′32″N 51°02′15″E
- Country: Iran
- Province: Bushehr
- County: Tangestan
- District: Delvar
- Rural District: Delvar

Population (2016)
  - Total: 1,296
- Time zone: UTC+3:30 (IRST)

Pahlavan Koshi (Persian: پهلوان كشي) (Note: Also romanized as Pahlavān Koshī; also known as Pahlavān Koshī-ye Bozorg and Pahlevān Koshī-ye Bozorg) is a village in Delvar Rural District of Delvar District (Note: Formerly Saheli District) in Tangestan County, Bushehr province, Iran.

== Demographics ==
=== Population ===
At the time of the 2006 National Census, the village's population was 977 in 234 households. The following census in 2011 counted 1,146 people in 308 households. The 2016 census measured the population of the village as 1,296 people in 383 households.
