= Gargur =

Village in Bushehr province, Iran

Gargur Persian: گرگور
- Village
- Location within Iran
- Coordinates: 28°52′16″N 51°02′50″E
- Country: Iran
- Province: Bushehr
- County: Tangestan
- District: Delvar
- Rural District: Delvar

Population (2016)
  - Total: 1,002
- Time zone: UTC+3:30 (IRST)

Gargur (Persian: گرگور) (Note: Also romanized as Gargoor and Gargūr; also known as Gargūr-e Meyān, and Gargūr-e Mīān) is a village in Delvar Rural District of Delvar District (Note: Formerly Saheli District) in Tangestan County, Bushehr province, Iran.

== Demographics ==
=== Population ===
At the time of the 2006 National Census, the village's population was 795 in 161 households. The following census in 2011 counted 874 people in 225 households. The 2016 census measured the population of the village as 1,002 people in 282 households.
