= Ali Shams ol Din =

Neighborhood in Bushehr province, Iran

Ali Shams ol Din Persian: عالي شمس الدين
- Neighborhood
- Location within Iran
- Coordinates: 28°54′38″N 51°09′13″E
- Country: Iran
- Province: Bushehr
- County: Tangestan
- District: Central
- Rural District: Baghak
- Village: Baghak-e Jonubi

Population (2006)
  - Total: 158
- Time zone: UTC+3:30 (IRST)

Ali Shams ol Din (Persian: عالي شمس الدين) (Note: Also romanized as ‘Ālī Shams od Dīn and ‘Ālī Shams ol Dīn; also known as Āl Shams od Dīn and Āl-e Shams od Dīn) is a neighborhood in the village of Baghak-e Jonubi in Baghak Rural District of the Central District in Tangestan County, Bushehr province, Iran.

== Demographics ==
=== Population ===
At the time of the 2006 National Census, Ali Shams ol Din's population was 158 in 37 households, when it was a village in Baghak Rural District.

== History ==
In 2010, the villages of Ali Shams ol Din, Bagh-e Salem-e Jonubi, Bagh-e Salem-e Shomali, Deh-e Now, Deh Kohneh, Jovey, Mal Barik, Rameh Char, Shamshiri, and Tokhmari merged to form the village of Baghak-e Jonubi.
