= Barbu, Iran =

Barbu Nazar بربو نزار
- Village
- Location within Iran
- Coordinates: 28°38′54″N 51°04′35″E
- Country: Iran
- Province: Bushehr
- County: Tangestan
- Bakhsh: Delvar
- Rural District: Bu ol Kheyr

Population (2006)
  - Total: 42
- Time zone: UTC+3:30 (IRST)
  - Summer (DST): UTC+4:30 (IRDT)

Barbu Nazar (Persian: بربو نزار, also Romanized as Barbū Nazar) is a village in Bu ol Kheyr Rural District, Delvar District, Tangestan County, Bushehr Province, Iran. At the 2006 census, its population was 42, in 12 families.
