= Bagh-e Salem-e Jonubi =

Neighborhood in Bushehr province, Iran

Bagh-e Salem-e Jonubi Persian: باغ سالم جنوبي
- Neighborhood
- Country: Iran
- Province: Bushehr
- County: Tangestan
- District: Central
- Rural District: Baghak
- Village: Baghak-e Jonubi

Population (2006)
  - Total: 108
- Time zone: UTC+3:30 (IRST)

Bagh-e Salem-e Jonubi (Persian: باغ سالم جنوبي) is a neighborhood in the village of Baghak-e Jonubi in Baghak Rural District of the Central District in Tangestan County, Bushehr province, Iran.

== Demographics ==
=== Population ===
At the time of the 2006 National Census, Bagh-e Salem-e Jonubi's population was 108 in 27 households, when it was a village in Baghak Rural District.

== History ==
In 2010, the villages of Ali Shams ol Din, Bagh-e Salem-e Jonubi, Bagh-e Salem-e Shomali, Deh-e Now, Deh Kohneh, Jovey, Mal Barik, Rameh Char, Shamshiri, and Tokhmari merged to form the village of Baghak-e Jonubi.
