= Zaer Ebrahimi =

Zaer Ebrahimi زايرابراهيمي
- Village
- Location within Iran
- Coordinates: 28°57′15″N 51°03′15″E
- Country: Iran
- Province: Bushehr
- County: Tangestan
- Bakhsh: Delvar
- Rural District: Delvar

Population (2006)
  - Total: 214
- Time zone: UTC+3:30 (IRST)
  - Summer (DST): UTC+4:30 (IRDT)

Zaer Ebrahimi (Persian: زايرابراهيمي, also Romanized as Zā'er Ebrāhīmī; also known as Ebrāhīm) is a village in Delvar Rural District, Delvar District, Tangestan County, Bushehr Province, Iran. 56 families made up its 214 residents in 2006, according to the census.
