= Ahsham-e Jamal =

Gorak-e Jamali گورک جمالی
- Village
- Location within Iran
- Coordinates: 28°55′20″N 51°02′05″E
- Country: Iran
- Province: Bushehr
- County: Tangestan
- Bakhsh: Delvar
- Rural District: Delvar

Population (2006)
  - Total: 148
- Time zone: UTC+3:30 (IRST)
  - Summer (DST): UTC+4:30 (IRDT)

Gorak-e Jamali (Persian: گورک جمالی, also Romanized as Gorak-e Jamali) is a village in Delvar Rural District, Delvar District, Tangestan County, Bushehr Province, Iran. At the 2006 census, its population was 148, in 36 families.
