= Barikan =

Barikan (Persian: باريكان) may refer to various places in Iran:

- Barikan, Alborz
- Barikan, Bushehr
- Berikan, Bushehr Province
