= Khodaruha =

Neighborhood in Bushehr province, Iran

Khodaruha Persian: خدروها
- Neighborhood
- Country: Iran
- Province: Bushehr
- County: Tangestan
- District: Central
- Rural District: Baghak
- Village: Baghak-e Shomali

Population (2006)
  - Total: 86
- Time zone: UTC+3:30 (IRST)

Khodaruha (Persian: خدروها) (Note: Also romanized as Khodarūhā) is a neighborhood in the village of Baghak-e Shomali in Baghak Rural District of the Central District in Tangestan County, Bushehr province, Iran.

== Demographics ==
=== Population ===
At the time of the 2006 National Census, Khodaruha's population was 86 in 20 households, when it was a village in Baghak Rural District.

== History ==
In 2010, the villages of Ahsham-e Khodadad, Ahsham-e Mohammad Heydar, Ahsham-e Zar-e Mohammad, and Khodaruha merged to form the village of Baghak-e Shomali.
