= Khvor-e Shahabi =

Village in Bushehr province, Iran

Khvor-e Shahabi Persian: خورشهابي
- Village
- Location within Iran
- Coordinates: 28°29′07″N 51°06′36″E
- Country: Iran
- Province: Bushehr
- County: Tangestan
- District: Delvar
- Rural District: Bu ol Kheyr

Population (2016)
  - Total: 1,444
- Time zone: UTC+3:30 (IRST)

Khvor-e Shahabi (Persian: خورشهابي) (Note: Also romanized as Khvor-e Shahābī and Khūr Shahābī; also known as Khor Chakābī, Khor Shahab, Khūr Shahā’ī, Khur-e Shahāb, and Khvor-e Shahāb) is a village in Bu ol Kheyr Rural District of Delvar District (Note: Formerly Saheli District) in Tangestan County, Bushehr province, Iran.

== Demographics ==
=== Population ===
At the time of the 2006 National Census, the village's population was 1,130 in 265 households. The following census in 2011 counted 1,295 people in 360 households. The 2016 census measured the population of the village as 1,444 people in 443 households.
