= Bonju =

Village in Bushehr province, Iran

Bonju Persian: بنجو
- Village
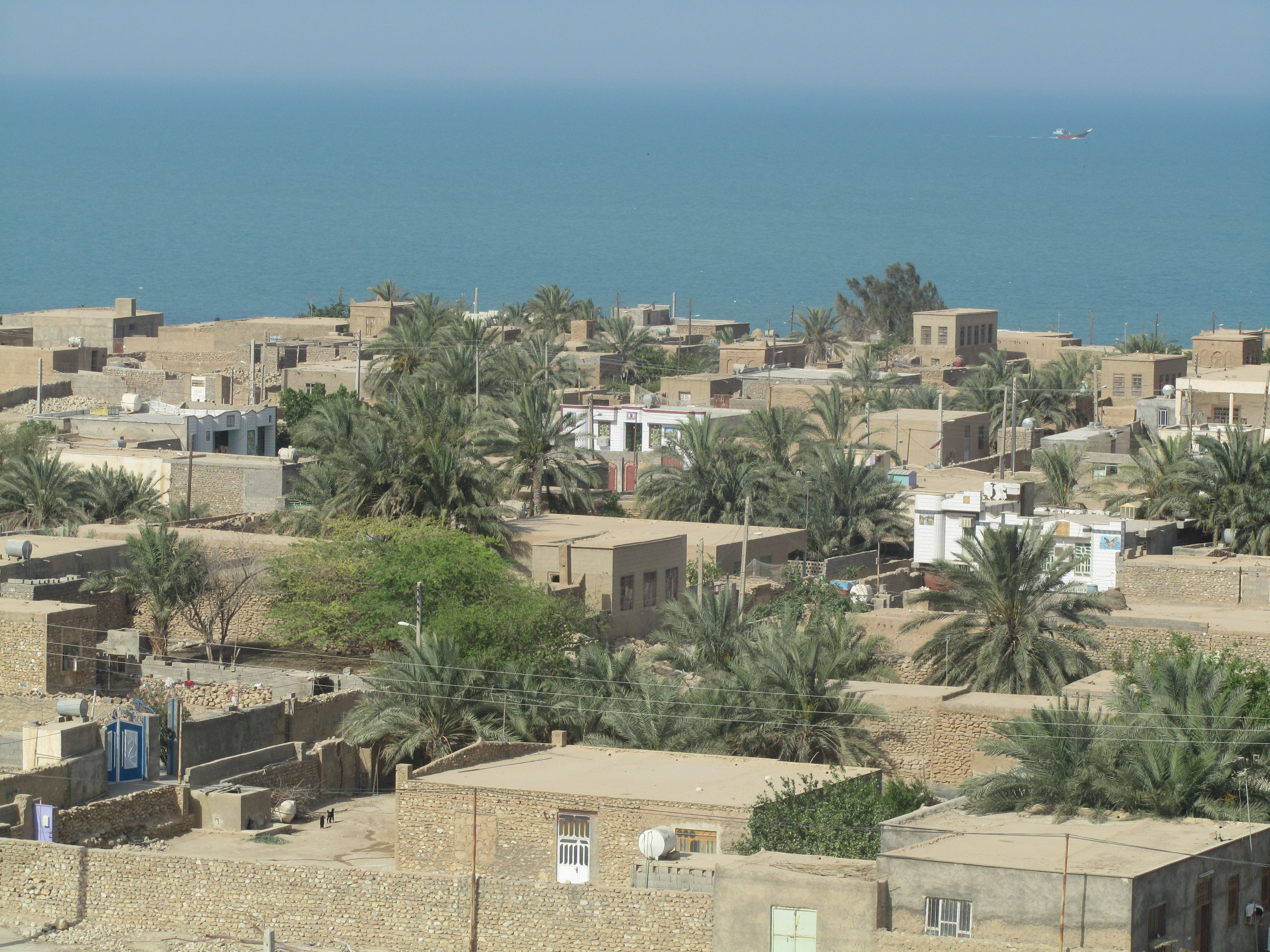
- Aerial, sea-facing view of the village of Bonju

- Location within Iran
- Coordinates: 28°28′22″N 51°06′54″E
- Country: Iran
- Province: Bushehr
- County: Tangestan
- District: Delvar
- Rural District: Bu ol Kheyr

Population (2016)
  - Total: 679
- Time zone: UTC+3:30 (IRST)

Bonju (Persian: بنجو) (Note: Also romanized as Bonjū) is a village in Bu ol Kheyr Rural District of Delvar District (Note: Formerly Saheli District) in Tangestan County, Bushehr province, Iran.

== Demographics ==
=== Population ===
At the time of the 2006 National Census, the village's population was 595 in 134 households. The following census in 2011 counted 638 people in 169 households. The 2016 census measured the population of the village as 679 people in 198 households.
