= Jainag =

Village in Bushehr province, Iran

Jainag Persian: جايينگ
- Village
- Location within Iran
- Coordinates: 28°47′12″N 51°04′06″E
- Country: Iran
- Province: Bushehr
- County: Tangestan
- District: Delvar
- Rural District: Delvar

Population (2016)
  - Total: 2,387
- Time zone: UTC+3:30 (IRST)

Jainag (Persian: جايينگ) (Note: Also romanized as Jā'īnag; also known as Gavainak, Goinak, Govīnak, Jā’enak, Jā'īnak, Jāvīnak, and Kūyenak) is a village in Delvar Rural District of Delvar District (Note: Formerly Saheli District) in Tangestan County, Bushehr province, Iran.

== Demographics ==
=== Population ===
At the time of the 2006 National Census, the village's population was 2,152 in 482 households. The following census in 2011 counted 2,309 people in 592 households. The 2016 census measured the population of the village as 2,387 people in 701 households.
