= Gurak-e Soleymani =

Gurak-e Soleymani گورك سليماني
- Village
- Location within Iran
- Coordinates: 28°56′11″N 51°02′49″E
- Country: Iran
- Province: Bushehr
- County: Tangestan
- Bakhsh: Delvar
- Rural District: Delvar

Population (2006)
  - Total: 240
- Time zone: UTC+3:30 (IRST)
  - Summer (DST): UTC+4:30 (IRDT)

Gurak-e Soleymani (Persian: گورك سليماني, also Romanized as Gūrak-e Soleymānī) is a village in Delvar Rural District, Delvar District, Tangestan County, Bushehr Province, Iran. At the 2006 census, its population was 240, in 57 families.
