= Rostami, Bu ol Kheyr =

Village in Bushehr province, Iran

Rostami Persian: رستمي
- Village
- Location within Iran
- Coordinates: 28°34′24″N 51°05′02″E
- Country: Iran
- Province: Bushehr
- County: Tangestan
- District: Delvar
- Rural District: Bu ol Kheyr

Population (2016)
  - Total: 1,671
- Time zone: UTC+3:30 (IRST)

Rostami (Persian: رستمي) (Note: Also romanized as Rostamī; also known as Bandar-e Rostamī and Rustami) is a village in Bu ol Kheyr Rural District of Delvar District (Note: Formerly Saheli District) in Tangestan County, Bushehr province, Iran.

== Demographics ==
=== Population ===
At the time of the 2006 National Census, the village's population was 1,427 in 341 households. The following census in 2011 counted 1,518 people in 381 households. The 2016 census measured the population of the village as 1,671 people in 465 households.
