= Gahi, Iran =

Gahi گاهي
- Village
- Location within Iran
- Coordinates: 28°32′46″N 51°05′18″E
- Country: Iran
- Province: Bushehr
- County: Tangestan
- Bakhsh: Delvar
- Rural District: Bu ol Kheyr

Population (2006)
  - Total: 540
- Time zone: UTC+3:30 (IRST)
  - Summer (DST): UTC+4:30 (IRDT)

Gahi (Persian: گاهي, also Romanized as Gāhī; also known as Gāvi) is a village in Bu ol Kheyr Rural District, Delvar District, Tangestan County, Bushehr Province, Iran. At the 2006 census, its population was 540, in 120 families.
