= Barbu Municipality =

Former municipality in Aust-Agder, Norway

Barbu Municipality Barbu kommune
- Former municipality
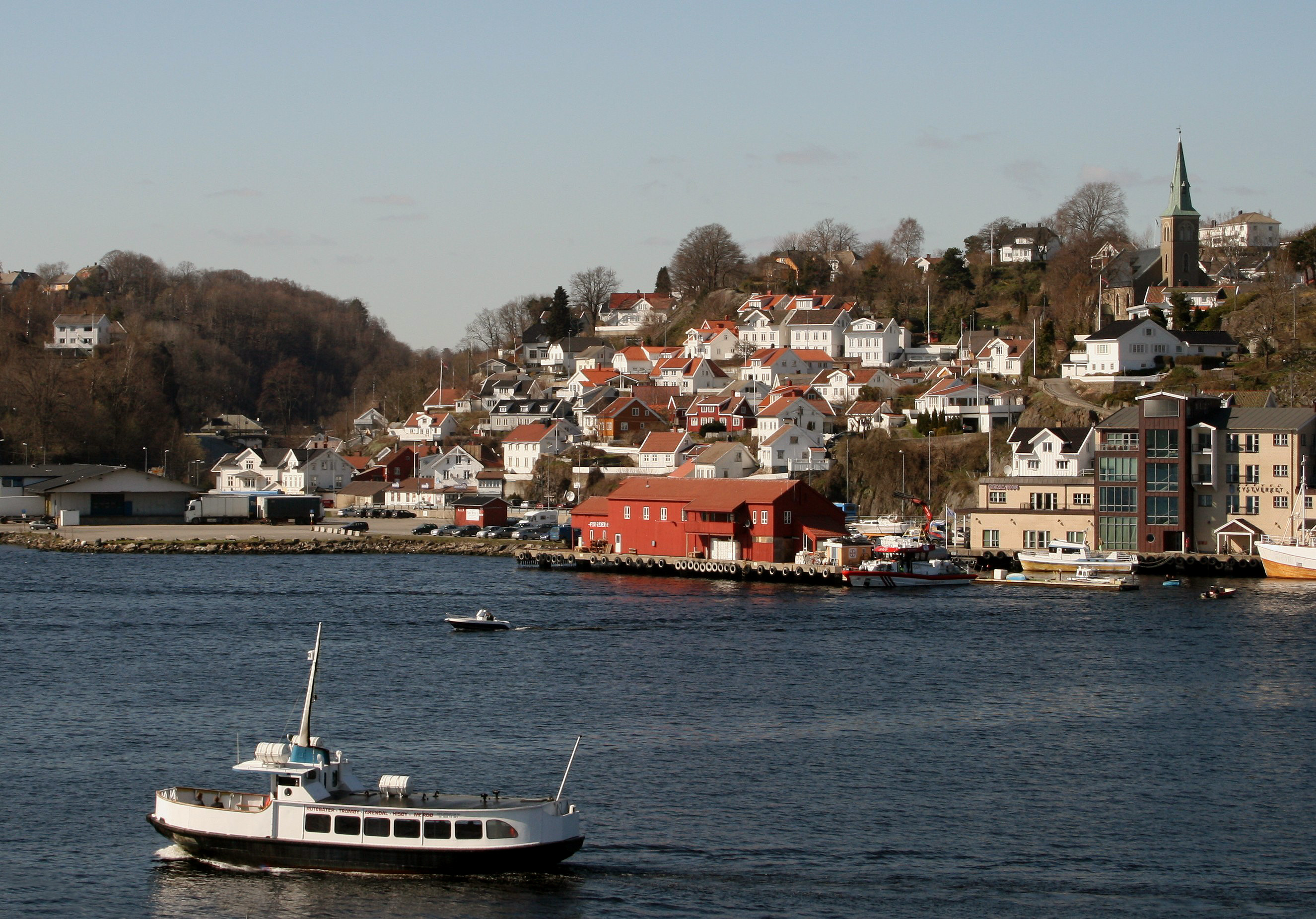
- View of Barbu

- Aust-Agder within Norway

- Barbu within Aust-Agder
- Coordinates: 58°27′59″N 08°46′41″E
- Country: Norway
- County: Aust-Agder
- District: Østre Agder
- Established: 1 Jan 1878
  - Preceded by: Østre Moland Municipality
- Disestablished: 1 Jan 1902
  - Succeeded by: Arendal Municipality
- Administrative centre: Barbu

Government
  - Mayor (1896–1901): O. Johnsen

Area
  - Total: 15.3 km^{2} (5.9 sq mi)
- Highest elevation: 114 m (374 ft)

Population (1902)
  - Total: 6,787
  - Density: 444/km^{2} (1,150/sq mi)
- Demonym: Barbufolk
- Time zone: UTC+01:00 (CET)
  - Summer (DST): UTC+02:00 (CEST)
- ISO 3166 code: NO-0990

Barbu is a former municipality in the old Nedenes county, Norway. The 15.3-square-kilometre (5.9 sq mi) municipality existed from 1878 until its dissolution in 1902. The area is now part of Arendal Municipality in the traditional district of Østre Agder in Agder county. The administrative centre was the village of Barbu near the location of Barbu Church. Today the village of Barbu is a borough at the head of the Galtesundet strait within the town of Arendal. Barbu is also a parish (sogn) in the Arendal prosti (deanery) within the Diocese of Agder og Telemark.

== General information ==
The municipality of Barbu was established on 1 May 1878 when Østre Moland Municipality was divided into three:

- the southwestern district (population: 4,874) became the new Barbu Municipality
- the southeastern district (population: 2,320) became the new Tromøy Municipality
- the northern district (population: 2,524) continued as a smaller Østre Moland Municipality

On 1 January 1902, Barbu Municipality (population: 6,787) was dissolved and merged into Arendal Municipality, vastly increasing the size of Arendal.

=== Name ===
The municipality (originally the parish) is named after the old Barbu farm (Old Norse: Berubú). The first element is likely derived from the female name Bera. Another theory is that the first element is the old name for a local river. The last element is bú which means "dwelling" or "farm".

=== Churches ===
The Church of Norway had one parish (sokn) within Barbu Municipality. At the time of the municipal dissolution, it was part of the Barbu prestegjeld and the Arendal prosti (deanery) in the Diocese of Agder.

Churches in Barbu Municipality
Parish (sokn)	Church name	Location of the church	Year built
Barbu	Barbu Church	Barbu	1880

== Geography ==
The municipality was located just to the north of what was then the 0.34-square-kilometre (84-acre) town of Arendal. The highest point in the municipality was the 114-metre (374 ft) tall mountain Varden, a tripoint on the border of Østre Moland Municipality, Øiestad Municipality, and Barbu Municipality. Østre Moland Municipality was located to the north, Tromø Municipality was located to the east, Hisøy Municipality and Arendal Municipality were located to the south, and Øyestad Municipality was located to the west.

== Government ==
While it existed, Barbu Municipality was responsible for primary education (through 10th grade), outpatient health services, senior citizen services, welfare and other social services, zoning, economic development, and municipal roads and utilities. The municipality was governed by a municipal council of directly elected representatives. The mayor was indirectly elected by a vote of the municipal council. The municipality was under the jurisdiction of the Nedenes District Court and the Agder Court of Appeal.

=== Mayors ===
The mayor (Norwegian: ordfører) of Barbu Municipality was the political leader of the municipality and the chairperson of the municipal council. The following people have held this position:

- 1878–1881: Ditlef Lundgren
- 1882–1883: O. Johnsen
- 1884–1887: Rev. J.A. Gjerløw
- 1888–1893: O. Johnsen
- 1894–1895: C. Aasen
- 1896–1901: O. Johnsen

== See also ==
- List of former municipalities of Norway
