= Gurak-e Sadat =

Village in Bushehr province, Iran

Gurak-e Sadat Persian: گورك سادات
- Village
- Location within Iran
- Coordinates: 28°56′40″N 51°03′00″E
- Country: Iran
- Province: Bushehr
- County: Tangestan
- District: Delvar
- Rural District: Delvar

Population (2016)
  - Total: 1,066
- Time zone: UTC+3:30 (IRST)

Gurak-e Sadat (Persian: گورك سادات) (Note: Also romanized as Gūrak Sādāt and Gūrak-e Sādāt; also known as Goorak, Gūrak, Kūrak, Mahāni, and Ma‘nā’ī) is a village in Delvar Rural District of Delvar District (Note: Formerly Saheli District) in Tangestan County, Bushehr province, Iran.

== Demographics ==
=== Population ===
At the time of the 2006 National Census, the village's population was 669 in 151 households. The following census in 2011 counted 908 people in 240 households. The 2016 census measured the population of the village as 1,066 people in 324 households.
