= Khiari =

Khiari خياري
- Village
- Location within Iran
- Coordinates: 28°52′11″N 51°10′39″E
- Country: Iran
- Province: Bushehr
- County: Tangestan
- Bakhsh: Central
- Rural District: Baghak

Population (2006)
  - Total: 434
- Time zone: UTC+3:30 (IRST)
  - Summer (DST): UTC+4:30 (IRDT)

Khiari (Persian: خياري, also Romanized as Khīārī and Khīyarī; also known as Aḩsham-e ‘Alī Aḩmad Kheyārī and Aḩsham-e ‘Alī Aḩmad Khīārī) is a village in Baghak Rural District, in the Central District of Tangestan County, Bushehr Province, Iran. At the 2006 census, its population was 434, in 107 families.
