= Delvar =

City in Bushehr province, Iran

Delvar Persian: دلوار
- City
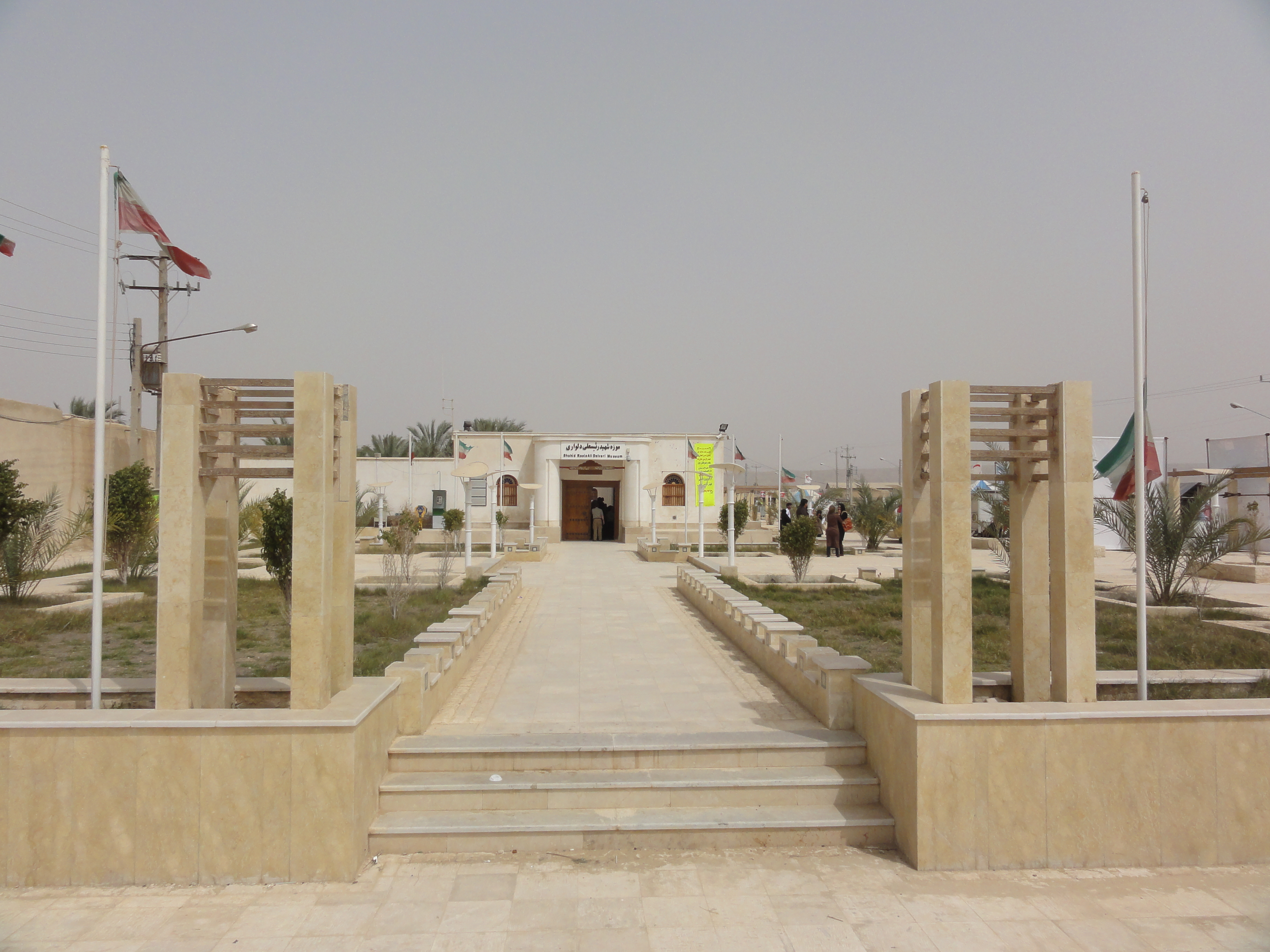
- The exterior of the Raisali Delvari Museum

- Location within Iran
- Coordinates: 28°45′41″N 51°04′12″E
- Country: Iran
- Province: Bushehr
- County: Tangestan
- District: Delvar
- Established as a city: 1996

Population (2016)
  - Total: 4,442
- Time zone: UTC+3:30 (IRST)

Delvar (Persian: دلوار) (Note: Also known as Bandar-e Delvār (بندر دلوار), Del Vāz, Dilba, Dilbār, and Dirbāk) is a city in, and the capital of, Delvar District (Note: Formerly Saheli District) in Tangestan County, Bushehr province, Iran. It also serves as the administrative center for Delvar Rural District. The village of Delvar was converted to a city in 1996. Delvar lies near the coast, and a stadium is to the southeast of the city.

== Demographics ==
=== Population ===
At the time of the 2006 National Census, the city's population was 3,201 in 723 households. The following census in 2011 counted 3,704 people in 922 households. The 2016 census measured the population of the city as 4,442 people in 1,238 households.

== See also ==
Media related to Delvar at Wikimedia Commons
