= Sartal, Bushehr =

Village in Bushehr province, Iran

Sartal Persian: سرتل
- Village
- Location within Iran
- Coordinates: 28°54′53″N 51°02′04″E
- Country: Iran
- Province: Bushehr
- County: Tangestan
- District: Delvar
- Rural District: Delvar

Population (2016)
  - Total: 532
- Time zone: UTC+3:30 (IRST)

Sartal (Persian: سرتل) (Note: Formerly Ahsham-e Sartal (احشام سرتل), also romanized as Aḩshām-e Sartal) is a village in Delvar Rural District of Delvar District (Note: Formerly Saheli District) in Tangestan County, Bushehr province, Iran.

== Demographics ==
=== Population ===
At the time of the 2006 National Census, the village's population was 359 in 86 households. The following census in 2011 counted 480 people in 122 households. The 2016 census measured the population of the village as 532 people in 152 households.
