= Barbu (name) =

Barbu is a male Romanian given name or a surname; of obscure origin, it may derive from either the word barbă ("beard") or serve as the masculine form of Barbara.

== As a given name ==
- Barbu Alinescu (1890–1952), Romanian general
- Barbu Bellu (1825–1900), Romanian baron and politician
- Barbu Brezianu (1909–2008), Romanian poet, art critic, art historian and judge
- Barbu Catargiu (1807–1862), Romanian politician and journalist
- Barbu III Craiovescu (died 1565), de facto Prince of Wallachia
- Barbu Ștefănescu Delavrancea (1858–1918), Romanian dramatist and poet
- Barbu Fundoianu (1898–1944), Romanian and French poet-philosopher
- Barbu Lăzăreanu (1881–1957), Romanian literary historian, bibliographer and left-wing activist
- Barbu Paris Mumuleanu (1794–1836), Wallachian poet
- Barbu Nemțeanu (1887–1919), Romanian poet
- Barbu Solacolu (1897–1976), Romanian poet and social scientist
- Barbu Dimitrie Știrbei (1799–1869), Prince of Wallachia
- Barbu Știrbey (1872–1946), Prime Minister of Romania

== As a surname ==
- Alexandru Barbu (born 1987), Romanian alpine skier
- Constantin Barbu (born 1971), Romanian football player
- Daniel Barbu (born 1957), Romanian political scientist
- Eugen Barbu (1924–1993), Romanian novelist and journalist
- Filaret Barbu (1903–1984), Romanian operetta composer
- Florin Barbu (born 1974), Romanian bass guitarist
- Gelu Barbu (1932–2016), Romanian-born Spanish ballet dancer and choreographer
- Gheorghe Barbu (born 1951), Romanian politician
- Ion Barbu (1895–1961), Romanian mathematician and poet
- Marga Barbu (1929–2009), Romanian actress
- Marin Barbu (born 1958), Romanian football player and coach
- Natalia Barbu (born 1979), Moldovan singer and songwriter
- Ștefan Barbu (1908–1970), Romanian football player
- Sulfina Barbu (born 1967), Romanian politician
- Viorel P. Barbu (born 1941), Romanian mathematician

== See also ==
- Ion Barbu (disambiguation)
