= Shureki =

Village in Bushehr province, Iran

Shureki Persian: شوركي
- Village
- Location within Iran
- Coordinates: 28°50′09″N 51°12′07″E
- Country: Iran
- Province: Bushehr
- County: Tangestan
- District: Central
- Rural District: Baghak

Population (2016)
  - Total: 1,415
- Time zone: UTC+3:30 (IRST)

Shureki (Persian: شوركي) (Note: Also romanized as Shooraki, Shūrakī, and Shūrekī; also known as Gepū Shūrakī, Gīv Shā’īkī, Gīv Shū’īkī, Gīv Shūrakī, and Sūraki) is a village in, and the capital of Baghak Rural District in the Central District of Tangestan County, Bushehr province, Iran.

== Demographics ==
=== Population ===
At the time of the 2006 National Census, the village's population was 1,396 in 313 households. The following census in 2011 counted 1,539 people in 417 households. The 2016 census measured the population of the village as 1,415 people in 393 households.
