= Baghak-e Jonubi =

Village in Bushehr province, Iran

Baghak-e Jonubi Persian: باغک جنوبی
- Village
- Location within Iran
- Coordinates: 28°55′10″N 51°08′45″E
- Country: Iran
- Province: Bushehr
- County: Tangestan
- District: Central
- Rural District: Baghak
- Established: 2010

Population (2016)
  - Total: 1,173
- Time zone: UTC+3:30 (IRST)

Baghak-e Jonubi (Persian: باغک جنوبی) (Note: Also romanized as Bāghak-e Jonūbī) is a village in Baghak Rural District of the Central District of Tangestan County, Bushehr province, Iran.

== History ==
In 2010, the villages of Ali Shams ol Din, Bagh-e Salem-e Jonubi, Bagh-e Salem-e Shomali, Deh-e Now, Deh Kohneh, Jovey, Mal Barik, Rameh Char, Shamshiri, and Tokhmari merged to form the village of Baghak-e Jonubi.

== Demographics ==
=== Population ===
At the time of the 2011 National Census, the village's population was 1,210 people in 320 households. The 2016 census measured the population of the village as 1,173 people in 362 households.
