= Gurak-e Kalleh Bandi =

Village in Bushehr province, Iran

Gurak-e Kalleh Bandi Persian: گورك كله بندي
- Village
- Location within Iran
- Coordinates: 28°56′14″N 51°02′22″E
- Country: Iran
- Province: Bushehr
- County: Tangestan
- District: Delvar
- Rural District: Delvar

Population (2016)
  - Total: 1,340
- Time zone: UTC+3:30 (IRST)

Gurak-e Kalleh Bandi (Persian: گورك كله بندي) (Note: Also romanized as Gūrak-e Kalleh Bandī; also known as Gūrak-e Kelebandī) is a village in Delvar Rural District of Delvar District (Note: Formerly Saheli District) in Tangestan County, Bushehr province, Iran.

== Demographics ==
=== Population ===
At the time of the 2006 National Census, the village's population was 670 in 167 households. The following census in 2011 counted 1,066 people in 292 households. The 2016 census measured the population of the village as 1,340 people in 383 households.
