= Ahsham-e Hajj Khurshid =

Ahsham-e Hajj Khurshid احشام حاج خورشيد
- Village
- Country: Iran
- Province: Bushehr
- County: Tangestan
- Bakhsh: Central
- Rural District: Baghak

Population (2006)
  - Total: 70
- Time zone: UTC+3:30 (IRST)
  - Summer (DST): UTC+4:30 (IRDT)

Ahsham-e Hajj Khurshid (Persian: احشام حاج خورشيد, also Romanized as Aḩsham-e Ḩājj Khūrshīd) is a village in Baghak Rural District, in the Central District of Tangestan County, Bushehr Province, Iran. At the 2006 census, its population was 70, in 18 families. The 2006 headcount of the population is yet to be updated.
