= Ahmadabad, Tangestan =

Village in Bushehr province, Iran

Ahmadabad Persian: احمداباد
- Village
- Location within Iran
- Coordinates: 28°56′50″N 51°08′20″E
- Country: Iran
- Province: Bushehr
- County: Tangestan
- District: Central
- Rural District: Baghak

Population (2016)
  - Total: 503
- Time zone: UTC+3:30 (IRST)

Ahmadabad (Persian: احمداباد) (Note: Also romanized as Aḩmadābād; also known as Aḩmadābād-e Bālā) is a village in Baghak Rural District of the Central District in Tangestan County, Bushehr province, Iran.

== Demographics ==
=== Population ===
At the time of the 2006 National Census, the village's population was 431 in 109 households. The following census in 2011 counted 464 people in 129 households. The 2016 census measured the population of the village as 503 people in 159 households.
