= Ahsham-e Manu Ahmadi =

Ahsham-e Manu Ahmadi احشام منواحمدي
- Village
- Location within Iran
- Coordinates: 28°08′48″N 51°29′48″E
- Country: Iran
- Province: Bushehr
- County: Deyr
- Bakhsh: Bord Khun
- Rural District: Abkosh

Population (2006)
  - Total: 206
- Time zone: UTC+3:30 (IRST)
  - Summer (DST): UTC+4:30 (IRDT)

Ahsham-e Manu Ahmadi (Persian: احشام منواحمدي, also Romanized as Aḩsham-e Manū Aḩmadī and Aḩshām-e Manū Aḩmadī) is a village in Abkosh Rural District, Bord Khun District, Deyr County, Bushehr Province, Iran. At the 2006 census, its population was 206, in 35 families.
