= Ahsham-e Zar-e Mohammad =

Neighborhood in Bushehr province, Iran

Ahsham-e Zar-e Mohammad Persian: احشام زارمحمد
- Neighborhood
- Country: Iran
- Province: Bushehr
- County: Tangestan
- District: Central
- Rural District: Baghak
- Village: Baghak-e Shomali

Population (2006)
  - Total: 199
- Time zone: UTC+3:30 (IRST)

Ahsham-e Zar-e Mohammad (Persian: احشام زارمحمد( (Note: Also romanized as Aḩshām-e Zār-e Moḩammad; also known as Aḩshām-e Zā‘er Moḩammadī, Aḩshām-e Zā'er-e Moḩammadī, and Aḩshām-e Zā‘er-e Moḩammadī) is a neighborhood in the village of Baghak-e Shomali in Baghak Rural District of the Central District in Tangestan County, Bushehr province, Iran.

== Demographics ==
=== Population ===
At the time of the 2006 National Census, Ahsham-e Zar-e Mohammad's population was 199 in 46 households, when it was a village in Baghak Rural District.

== History ==
In 2010, the villages of Ahsham-e Khodadad, Ahsham-e Mohammad Heydar, Ahsham-e Zar-e Mohammad, and Khodaruha merged to form the village of Baghak-e Shomali.
