= Baghak-e Shomali =

Village in Bushehr province, Iran

Baghak-e Shomali Persian: باغک شمالی
- Village
- Location within Iran
- Coordinates: 28°56′02″N 51°08′38″E
- Country: Iran
- Province: Bushehr
- County: Tangestan
- District: Central
- Rural District: Baghak
- Established: 2010

Population (2016)
  - Total: 506
- Time zone: UTC+3:30 (IRST)

Baghak-e Shomali (Persian: باغک شمالی) (Note: Also romanized as Bāghak-e Shomālī) is a village in Baghak Rural District of the Central District of Tangestan County, Bushehr province, Iran.

== History ==
In 2010, the villages of Ahsham-e Khodadad, Ahsham-e Mohammad Heydar, Ahsham-e Zar-e Mohammad, and Khodaruha merged to form the village of Baghak-e Shomali.

== Demographics ==
=== Population ===
At the time of the 2011 National Census, the village's population was 517 people in 131 households, The 2016 census measured the population of the village as 506 people in 149 households.
