= Boneh Gaz =

Village in Bushehr province, Iran

Boneh Gaz Persian: بنه گز
- Village
- Location within Iran
- Coordinates: 28°56′46″N 51°06′50″E
- Country: Iran
- Province: Bushehr
- County: Tangestan
- District: Central
- Rural District: Baghak

Population (2016)
  - Total: 3,254
- Time zone: UTC+3:30 (IRST)

Boneh Gaz (Persian: بنه گز) (Note: Also romanized as Boneh-ye Gaz and Boneh-ye Gez) is a village in Baghak Rural District of the Central District in Tangestan County, Bushehr province, Iran.

== Demographics ==
=== Population ===
At the time of the 2006 National Census, the village's population was 2,960 in 725 households. The following census in 2011 counted 3,305 people in 897 households. The 2016 census measured the population of the village as 3,254 people in 962 households. It was the most populous village in its rural district.
