= Shahniya =

Village in Bushehr province, Iran

Shahniya Persian: شهنيا
- Village
- Location within Iran
- Coordinates: 28°07′19″N 51°29′17″E
- Country: Iran
- Province: Bushehr
- County: Deyr
- District: Bord Khun
- Rural District: Abkosh

Population (2016)
  - Total: 2,070
- Time zone: UTC+3:30 (IRST)

Shahniya (Persian: شهنيا) (Note: Also romanized as Shah Nīā and Shahnīyā; also known as Shahīnā and Tahnā) is a village in Abkosh Rural District of Bord Khun District in Deyr County, Bushehr province, Iran.

== Demographics ==
=== Population ===
At the time of the 2006 National Census, the village's population was 1,330 in 276 households. The following census in 2011 counted 1,816 people in 464 households. The 2016 census measured the population of the village as 2,070 people in 567 households. It was the most populous village in its rural district.
