= Golaki =

Golaki گلكي
- Village
- Location within Iran
- Coordinates: 28°46′29″N 51°13′32″E
- Country: Iran
- Province: Bushehr
- County: Tangestan
- Bakhsh: Central
- Rural District: Baghak

Population (2006)
  - Total: 224
- Time zone: UTC+3:30 (IRST)
  - Summer (DST): UTC+4:30 (IRDT)

Golaki (Persian: گلكي, also Romanized as Golakī; also known as Gīlīkī and Gulaki) is a village in Baghak Rural District, in the Central District of Tangestan County, Bushehr Province, Iran. At the 2006 census, its population was 224, in 46 families.
