= Abkosh =

Village in Bushehr province, Iran

Abkosh Persian: ابكش
- Village
- Location within Iran
- Coordinates: 28°09′31″N 51°31′44″E
- Country: Iran
- Province: Bushehr
- County: Deyr
- District: Bord Khun
- Rural District: Abkosh

Population (2016)
  - Total: 750
- Time zone: UTC+3:30 (IRST)

Abkosh (Persian: ابكش) (Note: Also romanized as Ābkash and Ābkosh) is a village in, and the capital of, Abkosh Rural District in Bord Khun District of Deyr County, Bushehr province, Iran.

== Demographics ==
=== Population ===
At the time of the 2006 National Census, the village's population was 819 in 144 households. The following census in 2011 counted 855 people in 198 households. The 2016 census measured the population of the village as 750 people in 199 households.
