= Rashm =

Village in Semnan province, Iran

Rashm Persian: رشم
- Village
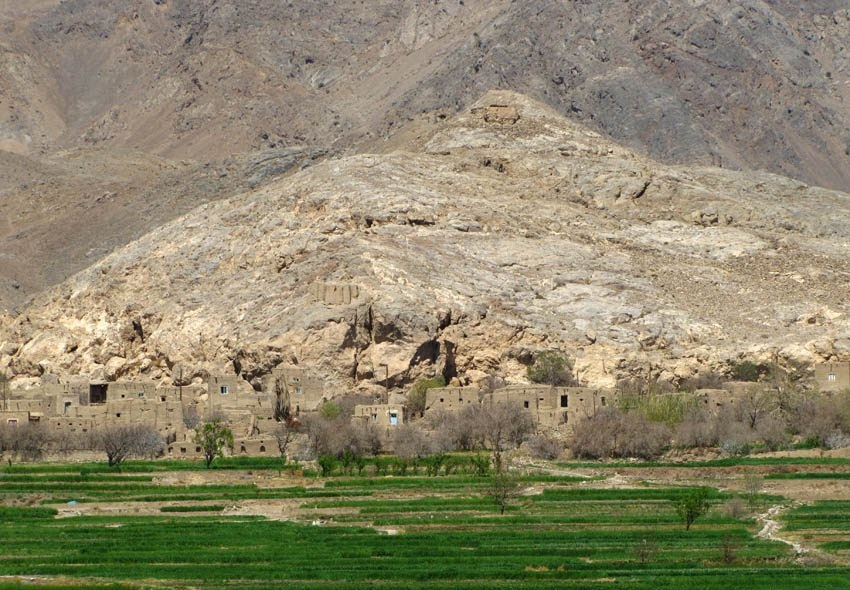
- The village of Rashm in 2011

- Location within Iran
- Coordinates: 35°16′49″N 54°29′25″E
- Country: Iran
- Province: Semnan
- County: Damghan
- District: Amirabad
- Rural District: Qohab-e Rastaq

Population (2016)
  - Total: 263
- Time zone: UTC+3:30 (IRST)

Rashm (Persian: رشم) (Note: Also romanized as Reshm and Rishm; also known as Gulāki) is a village in Qohab-e Rastaq Rural District of Amirabad District in Damghan County, Semnan province, Iran.

== Demographics ==
=== Population ===
At the time of the 2006 National Census, the village's population was 327 in 78 households. The following census in 2011 counted 334 people in 101 households. The 2016 census measured the population of the village as 263 people in 99 households.
