= Ion Barbu (disambiguation) =

Ion Barbu (1895–1961), Romanian mathematician and poet

Ion Barbu may also refer to:

- Ion Barbu (athlete) (born 1930), Romanian racewalker
- Ion Barbu (footballer, born 1938) (1938–2011), Romanian football player
- Ion Barbu (footballer, born 1977), Romanian football player
