= Khardan, Chaharmahal and Bakhtiari =

Khardan خاردان
- Village
- Location within Iran
- Coordinates: 31°31′22″N 50°49′00″E
- Country: Iran
- Province: Chaharmahal and Bakhtiari
- County: Lordegan
- Bakhsh: Central
- Rural District: Milas

Population (2006)
  - Total: 2,566
- Time zone: UTC+3:30 (IRST)
  - Summer (DST): UTC+4:30 (IRDT)

Khardan (Persian: خاردان, also Romanized as Khārdān) is a village in Milas Rural District, in the Central District of Lordegan County, Chaharmahal and Bakhtiari Province, Iran. At the 2006 census, its population was 2,566, in 526 families.
