= Ghurak-e Olya =

Ghurak-e Olya غورك عليا
- Village
- Location within Iran
- Coordinates: 30°15′52″N 51°11′06″E
- Country: Iran
- Province: Kohgiluyeh and Boyer-Ahmad
- County: Basht
- Bakhsh: Basht
- Rural District: Babuyi

Population (2006)
  - Total: 148
- Time zone: UTC+3:30 (IRST)
  - Summer (DST): UTC+4:30 (IRDT)

Ghurak-e Olya (Persian: غورك عليا, also Romanized as Ghūrak-e ‘Olyā; also known as Ghūrak, Ghūrak-e Bālā, and Qūrak) is a village in Babuyi Rural District, Basht District, Basht County, Kohgiluyeh and Boyer-Ahmad Province, Iran. At the 2006 census, its population was 148, in 29 families.
