= Ahsham Qaedha =

Ahsham Qaedha احشام قائدها
- Village
- Location within Iran
- Coordinates: 28°27′39″N 51°18′05″E
- Country: Iran
- Province: Bushehr
- County: Dashti
- Bakhsh: Central
- Rural District: Khvormuj

Population (2006)
  - Total: 133
- Time zone: UTC+3:30 (IRST)
  - Summer (DST): UTC+4:30 (IRDT)

Ahsham Qaedha (Persian: احشام قائدها, also Romanized as Aḩshām Qā’edhā and Aḩshām Qāyedhā; also known as Ahahām Qāidān, Aḩshām-e Qā’dhā, Ahsham Ghayedha, and Aḩshām Qeydān) is a village in Khvormuj Rural District, in the Central District of Dashti County, Bushehr Province, Iran. At the 2006 census, its population was 133, in 33 families.
