= Abkosh Rural District =

Rural district in Bushehr province, Iran

Abkosh Rural District Persian: دهستان آبکش
- Rural District
- Location within Iran
- Coordinates: 28°11′N 51°36′E
- Country: Iran
- Province: Bushehr
- County: Deyr
- District: Bord Khun
- Established: 1993
- Capital: Abkosh

Population (2016)
  - Total: 4,352
- Time zone: UTC+3:30 (IRST)

Abkosh Rural District (Persian: دهستان آبکش) is in Bord Khun District of Deyr County, Bushehr province, Iran. Its capital is the village of Abkosh.

== Demographics ==
=== Population ===
At the time of the 2006 National Census, the rural district's population was 3,954 in 776 households. There were 4,222 inhabitants in 1,034 households at the following census of 2011, The 2016 census measured the population of the rural district as 4,352 in 1,170 households. The most populous of its nine villages was Shahniya, with 2,070 people.

=== Other villages in the rural district ===
- Mokhdan
- Vahdatabad
