= Vahdatabad, Bushehr =

Village in Bushehr province, Iran

Vahdatabad Persian: وحدت اباد
- Village
- Location within Iran
- Coordinates: 28°10′18″N 51°32′03″E
- Country: Iran
- Province: Bushehr
- County: Deyr
- District: Bord Khun
- Rural District: Abkosh

Population (2016)
  - Total: 325
- Time zone: UTC+3:30 (IRST)

Vahdatabad (Persian: وحدت اباد) (Note: Also romanized as Vaḥdatābād) is a village in Abkosh Rural District of Bord Khun District in Deyr County, Bushehr province, Iran.

== Demographics ==
=== Population ===
At the time of the 2006 National Census, the village's population was 369 in 71 households. The following census in 2011 counted 387 people in 86 households. The 2016 census measured the population of the village as 325 people in 86 households.
