= Vahdatabad, Ilam =

Vahdatabad وحدت اباد
- Village
- Location within Iran
- Coordinates: 33°12′58″N 47°17′13″E
- Country: Iran
- Province: Ilam
- County: Darreh Shahr
- Bakhsh: Central
- Rural District: Zarrin Dasht

Population (2006)
  - Total: 923
- Time zone: UTC+3:30 (IRST)
  - Summer (DST): UTC+4:30 (IRDT)

Vahdatabad (Persian: وحدت اباد, also Romanized as Vaḩdatābād; also known as Khānparī and Khān Parī va Shāh Parī) is a village in Zarrin Dasht Rural District, in the Central District of Darreh Shahr County, Ilam Province, Iran. At the 2006 census, its population was 923, in 181 families. The village is populated by Kurds.
