= Eshkali Mohammad Hajji =

Neighborhood in Bushehr province, Iran

Eshkali Mohammad Hajji Persian: اشكالي محمدحاجي
- Neighborhood
- Location within Iran
- Coordinates: 28°59′39″N 51°15′46″E
- Country: Iran
- Province: Bushehr
- County: Tangestan
- District: Central
- Rural District: Ahram
- Village: Eshkali

Population (2016)
  - Total: 335
- Time zone: UTC+3:30 (IRST)

Eshkali Mohammad Hajji (Persian: اشكالي محمدحاجي) (Note: Also romanized as Eshkālī Moḩammad Ḩājjī) is a neighborhood in the village of Eshkali in Ahram Rural District of the Central District in Tangestan County, Bushehr province, Iran.

== Demographics ==
=== Population ===
At the time of the 2006 National Census, Eshkali Mohammad Hajji's population was 224 in 48 households, when it was a village in Ahram Rural District. The following census in 2011 counted 250 people in 68 households. The 2016 census measured the population of the village as 335 people in 88 households.

In 2021, the villages of Eshkali Avaz Hoseyn, Eshkali Mohammad Hajji, Eshkali Seyyedi, and Eshkali Zayer Hoseyn merged in the formation of the village of Eshkali.
