= Eshkali, Bushehr =

Village in Bushehr province, Iran

Eshkali Persian: اشكالي
- Village
- Location within Iran
- Coordinates: 28°59′39″N 51°15′46″E
- Country: Iran
- Province: Bushehr
- County: Tangestan
- District: Central
- Rural District: Ahram
- Established: 2021
- Time zone: UTC+3:30 (IRST)

Eshkali (Persian: اشكالي) is a village in Ahram Rural District of the Central District in Tangestan County, Bushehr province, Iran.

== History ==
The villages of Eshkali Avaz Hoseyn, Eshkali Mohammad Hajji, Eshkali Seyyedi, and Eshkali Zayer Hoseyn merged in 2021 to form the new village of Eshkali.
