= Ali Hoseyni =

Village in Bushehr province, Iran

Ali Hoseyni Persian: عالي حسيني
- Village
- Location within Iran
- Coordinates: 28°45′23″N 51°14′36″E
- Country: Iran
- Province: Bushehr
- County: Tangestan
- District: Central
- Rural District: Baghak

Population (2016)
  - Total: 2,248
- Time zone: UTC+3:30 (IRST)

Ali Hoseyni (Persian: عالي حسيني) (Note: Also romanized as ‘Ālī Ḩoseynī and Ālī Ḩoseynī; also known as Ḩoseyn ‘Alī and Husain ‘Ali) is a village in Baghak Rural District of the Central District in Tangestan County, Bushehr province, Iran, The people of this village are from the Lor tribe and are known as the Sorkhi.

== Demographics ==
=== Population ===
At the timu of the 2006 National Census, the 's population was 1,922 in 393 households. The following census in 2011 counted 2,119 people in 502 households. The 2016 census measured the population of the village as 2,248 people in 609 households.
