= Mansuri-ye Vosta =

Mansuri-ye Vosta منصوري وسطي
- Village
- Location within Iran
- Coordinates: 28°57′26″N 51°16′22″E
- Country: Iran
- Province: Bushehr
- County: Tangestan
- Bakhsh: Central
- Rural District: Ahram

Population (2006)
  - Total: 67
- Time zone: UTC+3:30 (IRST)
  - Summer (DST): UTC+4:30 (IRDT)

Mansuri-ye Vosta (Persian: منصوري وسطي, also Romanized as Manşūrī-ye Vosţá; also known as Aḩshām-e Bakhshū’ī, Manşīreya, Manşīrīā, and Manşūrī) is a village in Ahram Rural District, in the Central District of Tangestan County, Bushehr Province, Iran. At the 2006 census, its population was 67, in 18 families.
