= Sajadiyeh, Bushehr =

Village in Bushehr province, Iran

Sajadiyeh Persian: سجاديه
- Village
- Location within Iran
- Coordinates: 28°04′35″N 51°28′58″E
- Country: Iran
- Province: Bushehr
- County: Deyr
- District: Bord Khun
- Rural District: Bord Khun

Population (2016)
  - Total: 398
- Time zone: UTC+3:30 (IRST)

Sajadiyeh (Persian: سجاديه) (Note: Formerly known as Ahsham-e Kohneh (احشام كهنه), also romanized as Aḩshām-e Kohneh) is a village in Bord Khun Rural District of Bord Khun District in Deyr County, Bushehr province, Iran.

== Demographics ==
=== Population ===
At the time of the 2006 National Census, the village's population was 186 in 36 households, when it was named Ahsham-e Kohneh. The following census in 2011 counted 210 people in 49 households, by which time the name of the village had been changed to Sajadabad. The 2016 census measured the population of the village as 398 people in 114 households.
