= Ahsham-e Ahmad =

Ahsham-e Ahmad or Ahsham Ahmad (Persian: احشام احمد) may refer to:

- Ahsham-e Ahmad, Deyr
- Ahsham-e Ahmad, Ganaveh
