= Khardun =

Khardun خاردون
- Village
- Location within Iran
- Coordinates: 29°13′57″N 57°12′45″E
- Country: Iran
- Province: Kerman
- County: Jiroft
- Bakhsh: Sarduiyeh
- Rural District: Sarduiyeh

Population (2006)
  - Total: 119
- Time zone: UTC+3:30 (IRST)
  - Summer (DST): UTC+4:30 (IRDT)

Khardun (Persian: خاردون, also Romanized as Khārdūn; also known as Khāfkūh and Khārdān) is a village in Sarduiyeh Rural District, Sarduiyeh District, Jiroft County, Kerman Province, Iran. As of the 2006 census, its population was 119, with there being 20 families.
