= Ghurak-e Sofla =

Ghurak-e Sofla غورك سفلي
- Village
- Location within Iran
- Coordinates: 30°16′30″N 51°11′02″E
- Country: Iran
- Province: Kohgiluyeh and Boyer-Ahmad
- County: Basht
- Bakhsh: Basht
- Rural District: Babuyi

Population (2006)
  - Total: 72
- Time zone: UTC+3:30 (IRST)
  - Summer (DST): UTC+4:30 (IRDT)

Ghurak-e Sofla (Persian: غورك سفلي, also Romanized as Ghūrak-e Soflá; also known as Ghūrak-e Pā’īn) is a village in Babuyi Rural District, Basht District, Basht County, Kohgiluyeh and Boyer-Ahmad Province, Iran. At the 2006 census, its population was 72, in 17 families.
