= Eshkali Avaz Hoseyn =

Neighborhood in Bushehr province, Iran

Eshkali Avaz Hoseyn Persian: اشكالي عوض حسين
- Neighborhood
- Country: Iran
- Province: Bushehr
- County: Tangestan
- District: Central
- Rural District: Ahram
- Village: Eshkali

Population (2016)
  - Total: 133
- Time zone: UTC+3:30 (IRST)

Eshkali Avaz Hoseyn (Persian: اشكالي عوض حسين) (Note: Also romanized as Eshkālī ʿAvaz̤ Ḩoseyn) is a neighborhood in the village of Eshkali in Ahram Rural District of the Central District in Tangestan County, Bushehr province, Iran.

== Demographics ==
=== Population ===
At the time of the 2006 National Census, Eshkali Avaz Hoseyn's population was 70 in 15 households, when it was a village in Ahram Rural District. The following census in 2011 counted 79 people in 21 households. The 2016 census measured the population of the village as 133 people in 29 households.

In 2021, the villages of Eshkali Avaz Hoseyn, Eshkali Mohammad Hajji, Eshkali Seyyedi, and Eshkali Zayer Hoseyn merged in the formation of the village of Eshkali.
