= Ghurak-e Vosta =

Ghurak-e Vosta غورك وسطي
- Village
- Location within Iran
- Coordinates: 30°16′00″N 51°10′00″E
- Country: Iran
- Province: Kohgiluyeh and Boyer-Ahmad
- County: Basht
- Bakhsh: Basht
- Rural District: Babuyi

Population (2006)
  - Total: 19
- Time zone: UTC+3:30 (IRST)
  - Summer (DST): UTC+4:30 (IRDT)

Ghurak-e Vosta (Persian: غورك وسطي, also Romanized as Ghūrak-e Vosţá; also known as Ghūrak-e Mīānī) is a village in Babuyi Rural District, Basht District, Basht County, Kohgiluyeh and Boyer-Ahmad Province, Iran. At the 2006 census, its population was 19, in 5 families.
