= Barbu, Norway =

Neighborhood in Arendal Municipality, Norway

Barbu
- Neighborhood
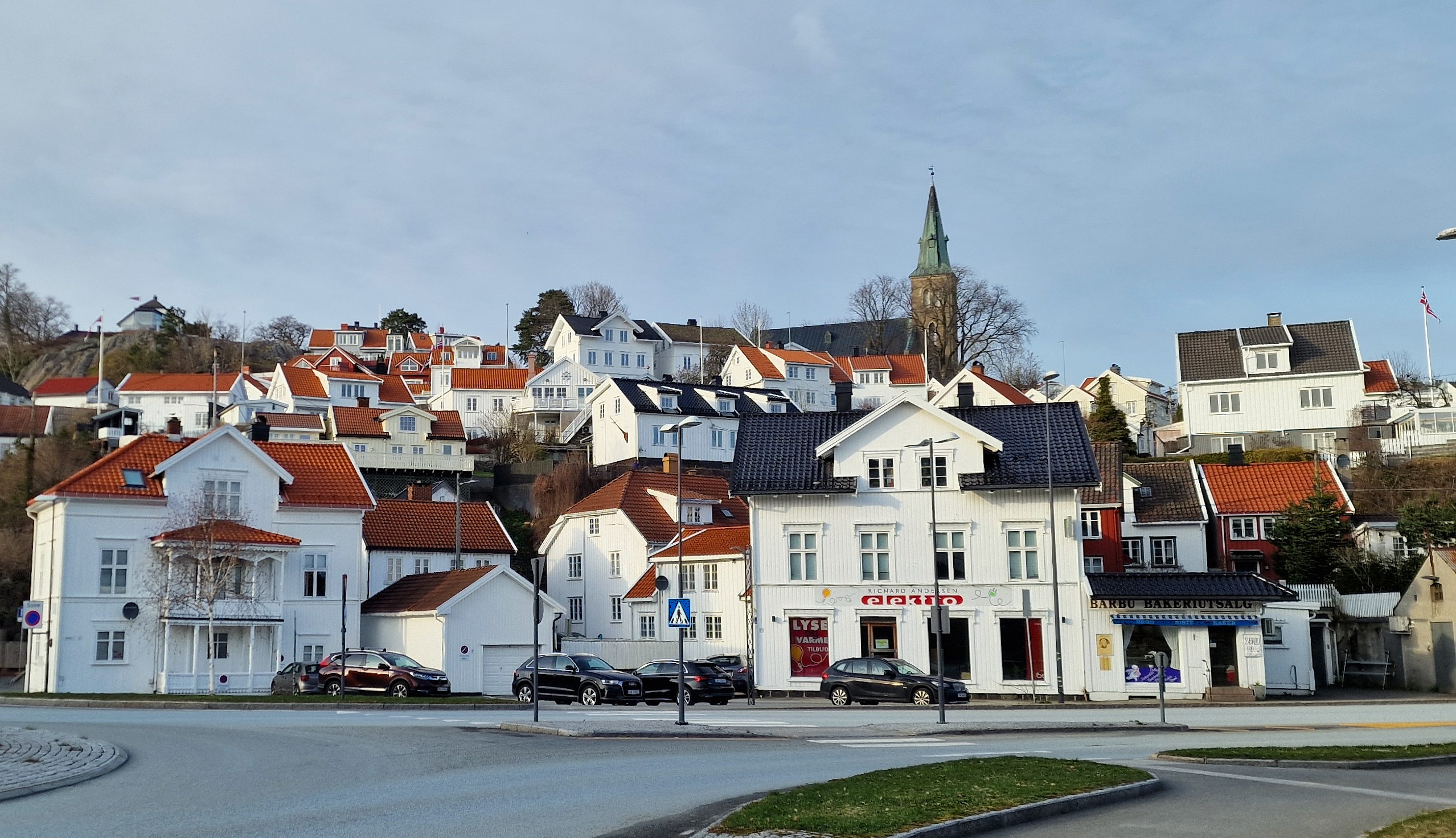
- View of the area
- Interactive map of Barbu
- Coordinates: 58.46271°N 8.77414°E
- Country: Norway
- Region: Southern Norway
- County: Agder
- District: Østre Agder
- Municipality: Arendal Municipality
- Elevation: 2 m (6.6 ft)
- Time zone: UTC+01:00 (CET)
  - Summer (DST): UTC+02:00 (CEST)
- Post Code: 4844 Arendal

Barbu is a neighborhood in Arendal Municipality in Agder county, Norway. The neighborhood is part of the urban town of Arendal, located just northeast of the main city centre. Barbu Church is located in the neighborhood.

== History ==
The original town of Arendal was quite small in size. Originally, the area surrounding the small town was part of Østre Moland Municipality. In 1878, the area immediately surrounding the town was separated and became the new Barbu Municipality. In 1902, all of Barbu Municipality was merged into the growing town of Arendal, vastly increasing the size of the town.
