= Vahdatabad, Kerman =

Vahdatabad وحدت اباد
- Village
- Location within Iran
- Coordinates: 29°50′22″N 57°01′06″E
- Country: Iran
- Province: Kerman
- County: Bardsir
- Bakhsh: Central
- Rural District: Negar
- Time zone: UTC+3:30 (IRST)
  - Summer (DST): UTC+4:30 (IRDT)

Vahdatabad (Persian: وحدت اباد, also Romanized as Vaḩdatābād) is a village in Negar Rural District, in the Central District of Bardsir County, Kerman Province, Iran. A census in 2006 acknowledged its existence, but its population was not reported.
