= Makhdan, Tangestan =

Makhdan مخدان
- Village
- Location within Iran
- Coordinates: 28°45′12″N 51°29′57″E
- Country: Iran
- Province: Bushehr
- County: Tangestan
- Bakhsh: Central
- Rural District: Ahram

Population (2006)
  - Total: 35
- Time zone: UTC+3:30 (IRST)
  - Summer (DST): UTC+4:30 (IRDT)

Makhdan (Persian: مخدان, also Romanized as Makhdān) is a village in Ahram Rural District, in the Central District of Tangestan County, Bushehr Province, Iran. At the 2006 census, its population was 35, in 10 families.
