= Ahsham Khosrow Khan =

Ahsham Khosrow Khan احشام خسروخان
- Village
- Country: Iran
- Province: Hormozgan
- County: Hajjiabad
- Bakhsh: Central
- Rural District: Dar Agah

Population (2006)
  - Total: 39
- Time zone: UTC+3:30 (IRST)
  - Summer (DST): UTC+4:30 (IRDT)

Ahsham Khosrow Khan (Persian: احشام خسروخان, also Romanized as Aḩshām Khosrow Khān) is a village in Dar Agah Rural District, in the Central District of Hajjiabad County, Hormozgan Province, Iran. At the 2006 census, its population was 39, in 8 families.
