= Vahdatabad, Fars =

Vahdatabad وحدت اباد
- Village
- Location within Iran
- Coordinates: 29°10′03″N 52°27′42″E
- Country: Iran
- Province: Fars
- County: Firuzabad
- Bakhsh: Meymand
- Rural District: Khvajehei

Population (2006)
  - Total: 853
- Time zone: UTC+3:30 (IRST)
  - Summer (DST): UTC+4:30 (IRDT)

Vahdatabad (Persian: وحدت اباد, also Romanized as Vaḩdatābād) is a village in Khvajehei Rural District, Meymand District, Firuzabad County, Fars province, Iran. At the 2006 census, its population was 853, in 212 families.
