= Gurak-e Khvorshidi =

Village in Bushehr province, Iran

Gurak-e Khvorshidi Persian: گورك خورشيدي
- Village
- Location within Iran
- Coordinates: 28°57′02″N 51°02′55″E
- Country: Iran
- Province: Bushehr
- County: Tangestan
- District: Delvar
- Rural District: Delvar

Population (2016)
  - Total: 1,246
- Time zone: UTC+3:30 (IRST)

Gurak-e Khvorshidi (Persian: گورك خورشيدي) (Note: Also romanized as Gūrak-e Khvorshīdī; also known as Khorshīdī, Khowrshīdī, and Khvorshīdī) is a village in Delvar Rural District of Delvar District (Note: Formerly Saheli District) in Tangestan County, Bushehr province, Iran.

== Demographics ==
=== Population ===
At the time of the 2006 National Census, the village's population was 654 in 147 households. The following census in 2011 counted 867 people in 218 households. The 2016 census measured the population of the village as 1,246 people in 350 households.
