= Mokhdan, Bord Khun =

Village in Bushehr province, Iran

Mokhdan Persian: مخدان
- Village
- Location within Iran
- Coordinates: 28°08′35″N 51°30′41″E
- Country: Iran
- Province: Bushehr
- County: Deyr
- District: Bord Khun
- Rural District: Abkosh

Population (2016)
  - Total: 942
- Time zone: UTC+3:30 (IRST)

Mokhdan (Persian: مخدان) (Note: Also romanized as Mokhdān; also known as Moghdān and Mukhdān) is a village in Abkosh Rural District of Bord Khun District in Deyr County, Bushehr province, Iran.

== Demographics ==
=== Population ===
At the time of the 2006 National Census, the village's population was 877 in 181 households. The following census in 2011 counted 870 people in 224 households. The 2016 census measured the population of the village as 942 people in 243 households.
