= Khardan-e Do =

Khardan-e Do خاردان2
- Village
- Location within Iran
- Coordinates: 29°49′21″N 56°20′01″E
- Country: Iran
- Province: Kerman
- County: Bardsir
- Bakhsh: Central
- Rural District: Kuh Panj

Population (2006)
  - Total: 21
- Time zone: UTC+3:30 (IRST)
  - Summer (DST): UTC+4:30 (IRDT)

Khardan-e Do (Persian: خاردان2, also Romanized as Khārdān-e Do; also known as Khārdūn) is a village in Kuh Panj Rural District, in the Central District of Bardsir County, Kerman Province, Iran. At the 2006 census, its population was 21, in 5 families.
