= Khardan, Baft =

Khardan خاردان
- Village
- Location within Iran
- Coordinates: 28°45′08″N 56°07′21″E
- Country: Iran
- Province: Kerman
- County: Baft
- Bakhsh: Central
- Rural District: Khabar

Population (2006)
  - Total: 125
- Time zone: UTC+3:30 (IRST)
  - Summer (DST): UTC+4:30 (IRDT)

Khardan (Persian: خاردان, also Romanized as Khārdān; also known as Aḩshām-e Ommīd ‘Alī, Akbarābād-e Kāhdān, Kāhedān, and Kāhedān-e Pā’īn) is a village in Khabar Rural District, in the Central District of Baft County, Kerman Province, Iran. At the 2006 census, its population was 125, in 25 families.
