= Eshkali Zayer Hoseyn =

Neighborhood in Bushehr province, Iran

Eshkali Zayer Hoseyn Persian: اشكالي زائرحسين
- Neighborhood
- Location within Iran
- Country: Iran
- Province: Bushehr
- County: Tangestan
- District: Central
- Rural District: Ahram
- Village: Eshkali

Population (2016)
  - Total: 66
- Time zone: UTC+3:30 (IRST)

Eshkali Zayer Hoseyn (Persian: اشكالي زائرحسين) (Note: Also romanized as Eshkālī Zāyer Ḩoseyn; also known as Ahsham Hasan, Aḩsḩām-e Ḩasan, Aḩshām-e Zā’er Ḩoseyn-e Ghazanfarī, Khasham Ḩasan, Oshkālī, Oshkālī Zā’er ’oseynī, and Shekārī-ye Zāyer Ḩoseyn) is a neighborhood in the village of Eshkali in Ahram Rural District of the Central District in Tangestan County, Bushehr province, Iran.

== Demographics ==
=== Population ===
At the time of the 2006 National Census, Eshkali Zayer Hoseyn's population was 62 in 14 households, when it was a village in Ahram Rural District. The following census in 2011 counted 56 people in 15 households. The 2016 census measured the population of the village as 66 people in 20 households.

In 2021, the villages of Eshkali Avaz Hoseyn, Eshkali Mohammad Hajji, Eshkali Seyyedi, and Eshkali Zayer Hoseyn merged in the formation of the village of Eshkali.
