= Barbu Church =

Church in Agder, Norway

- Barbu kirke
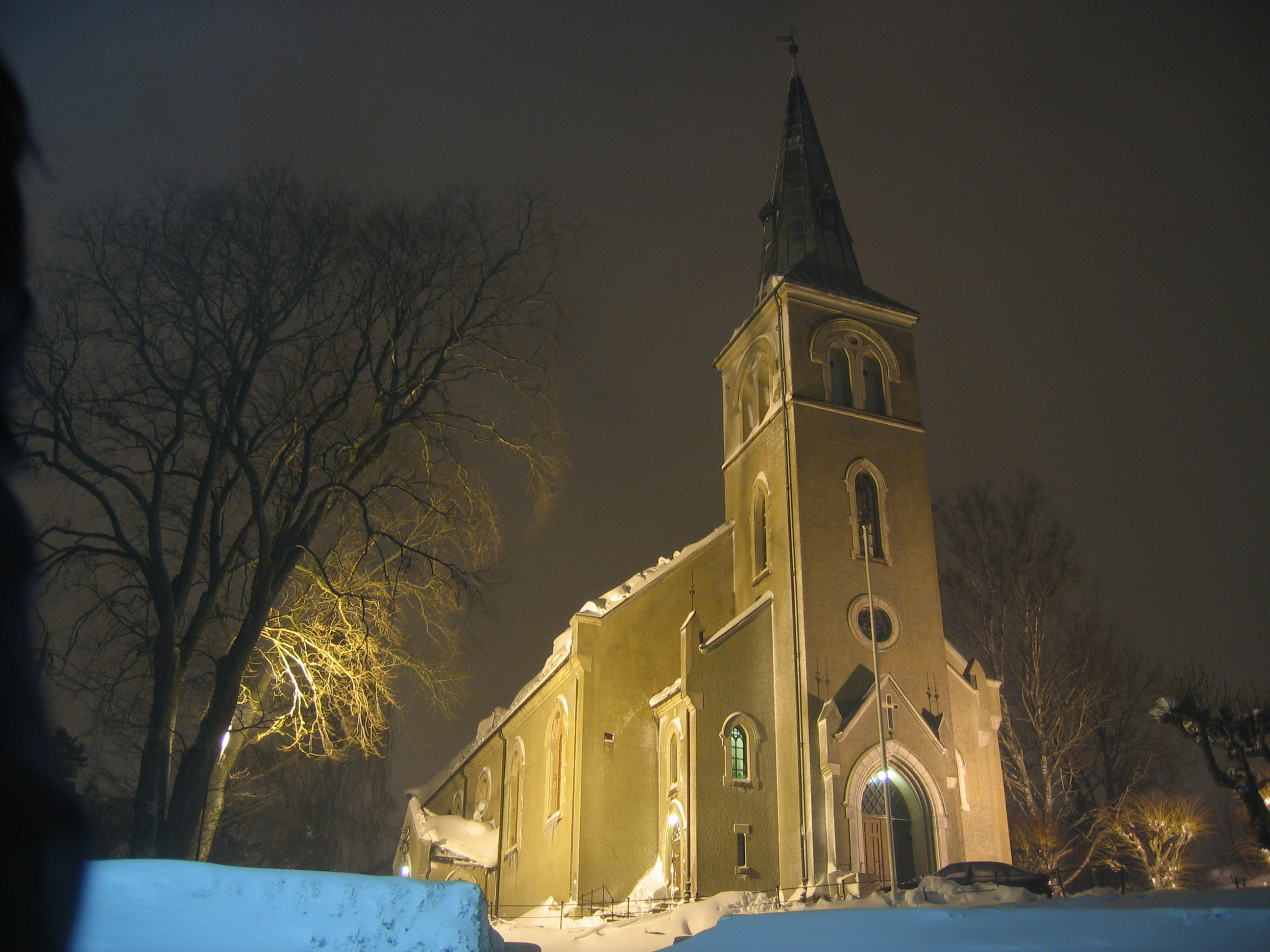
- View of the church
- Barbu Church
- 58.4643°N 08.7753°E
- Location: Arendal Municipality, Agder
- Country: Norway
- Denomination: Church of Norway
- Churchmanship: Evangelical Lutheran

History
- Status: Parish church
- Founded: 1880
- Consecrated: 17 Sept 1880

Architecture
- Functional status: Active
- Architect: Jacob Wilhelm Nordan
- Architectural type: Long church
- Completed: 1880 (146 years ago)

Specifications
- Capacity: 500
- Materials: Brick

Administration
- Diocese: Agder og Telemark
- Deanery: Arendal prosti
- Parish: Barbu
- Norwegian Cultural Heritage Site
- Type: Church
- Status: Listed
- ID: 83851

Barbu Church (Norwegian: Barbu kirke) is a parish church of the Church of Norway in Arendal Municipality in Agder county, Norway. It is located in the Barbu area of the town of Arendal. It is the church for the Barbu parish which is part of the Arendal prosti (deanery) in the Diocese of Agder og Telemark. The brown, brick church was built in a long church design in 1880 using plans drawn up by the architect Jacob Wilhelm Nordan. The church seats about 500 people.

== History ==
Originally, people living in the Barbu area were part of the Tromøy Church parish, and they had a long journey to the church. In 1859, fundraising and planning began for a new church on the mainland part of the parish. There was no agreement on where the church should be located and due to the quickly growing areas, it was decided to build two churches. Stokken Church was built in 1877 for the northeastern part of the mainland part of the parish and then in 1880 Barbu Church was built to serve the southwestern part of the mainland area in the parish. The new church was consecrated on 17 September 1880 by the Bishop Jørgen Engebretsen Moe. The brick church has a rectangular nave with a chancel that is a half-octagon. The brick building exterior is covered with gray/brown plaster.

== Media gallery ==
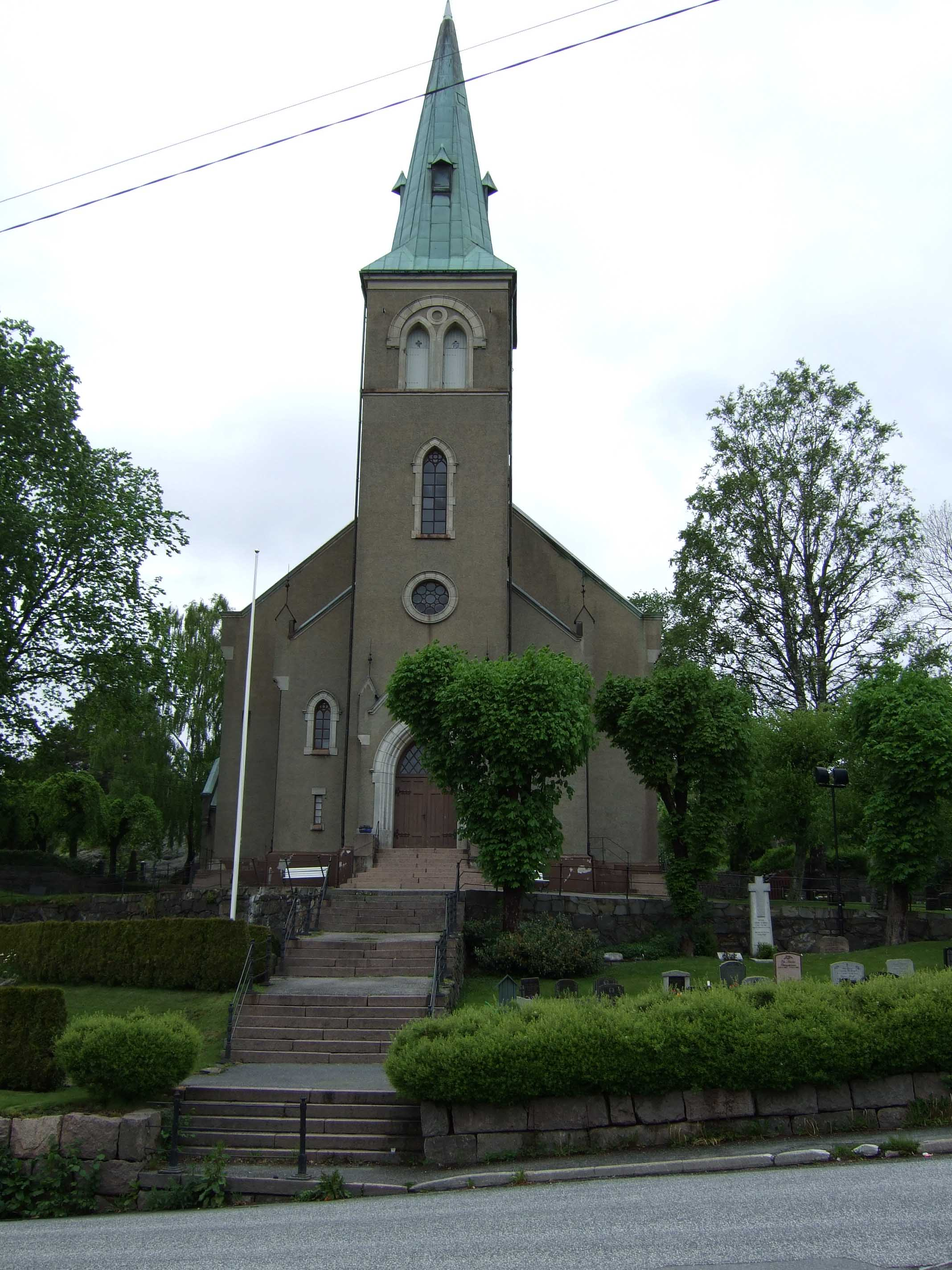

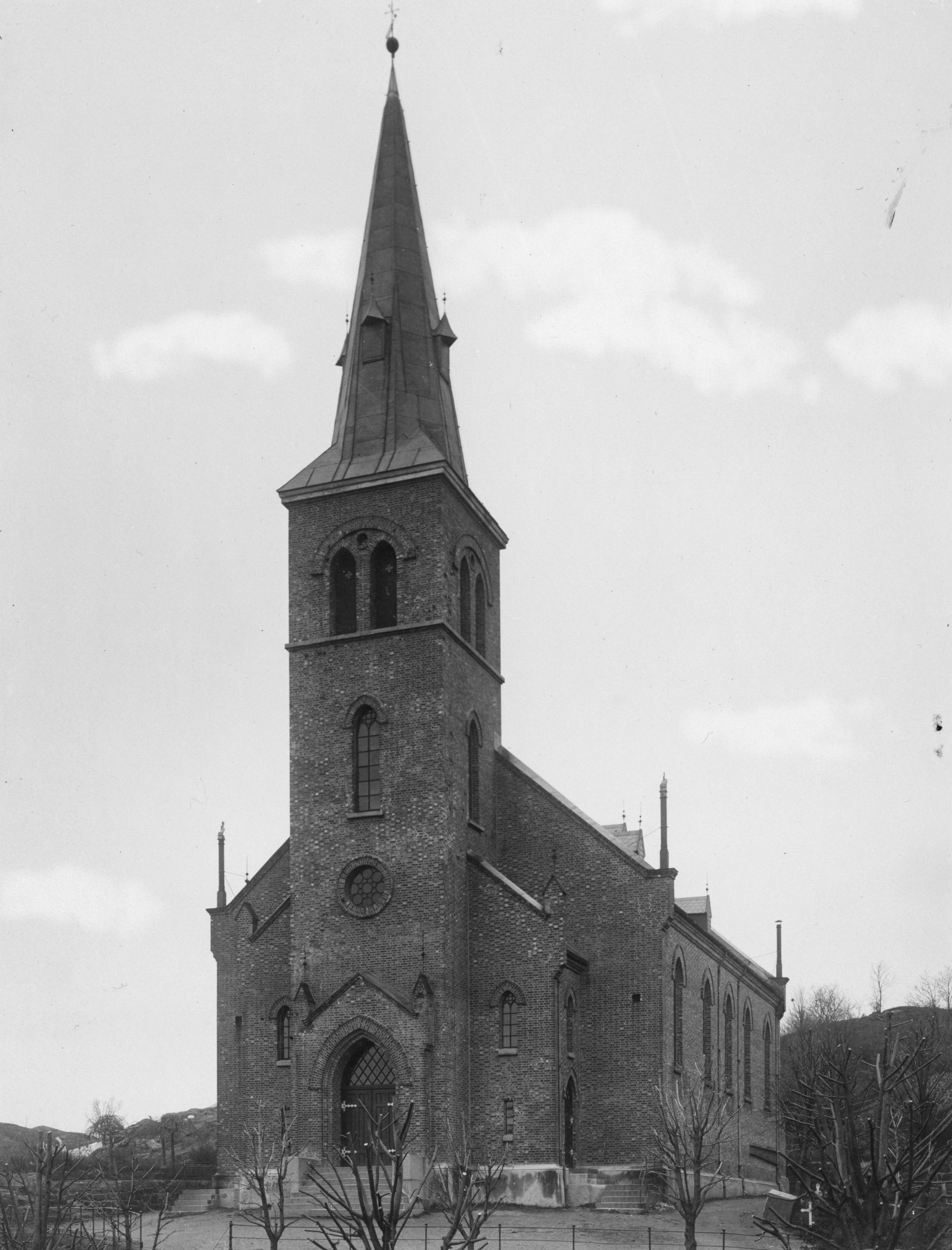

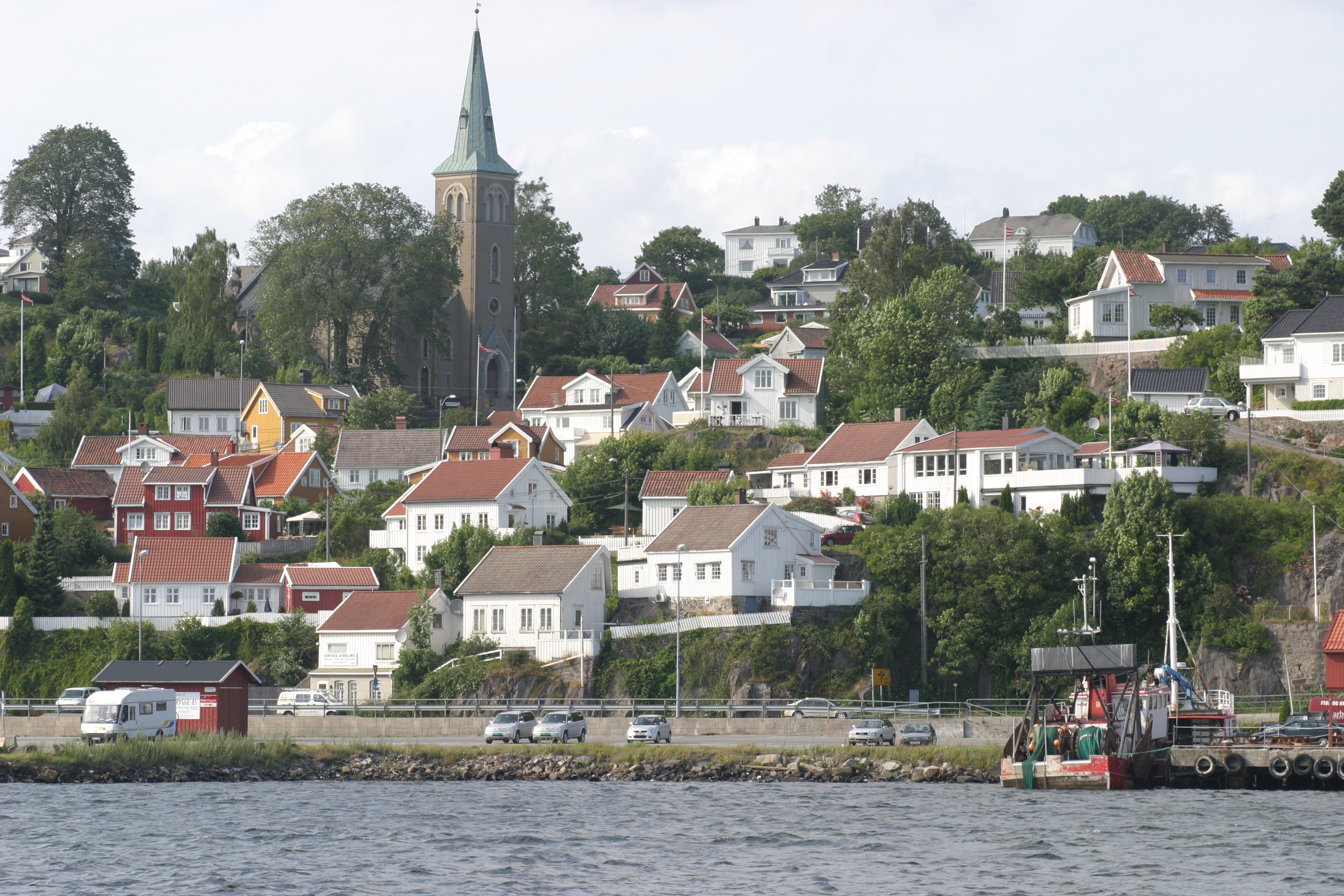

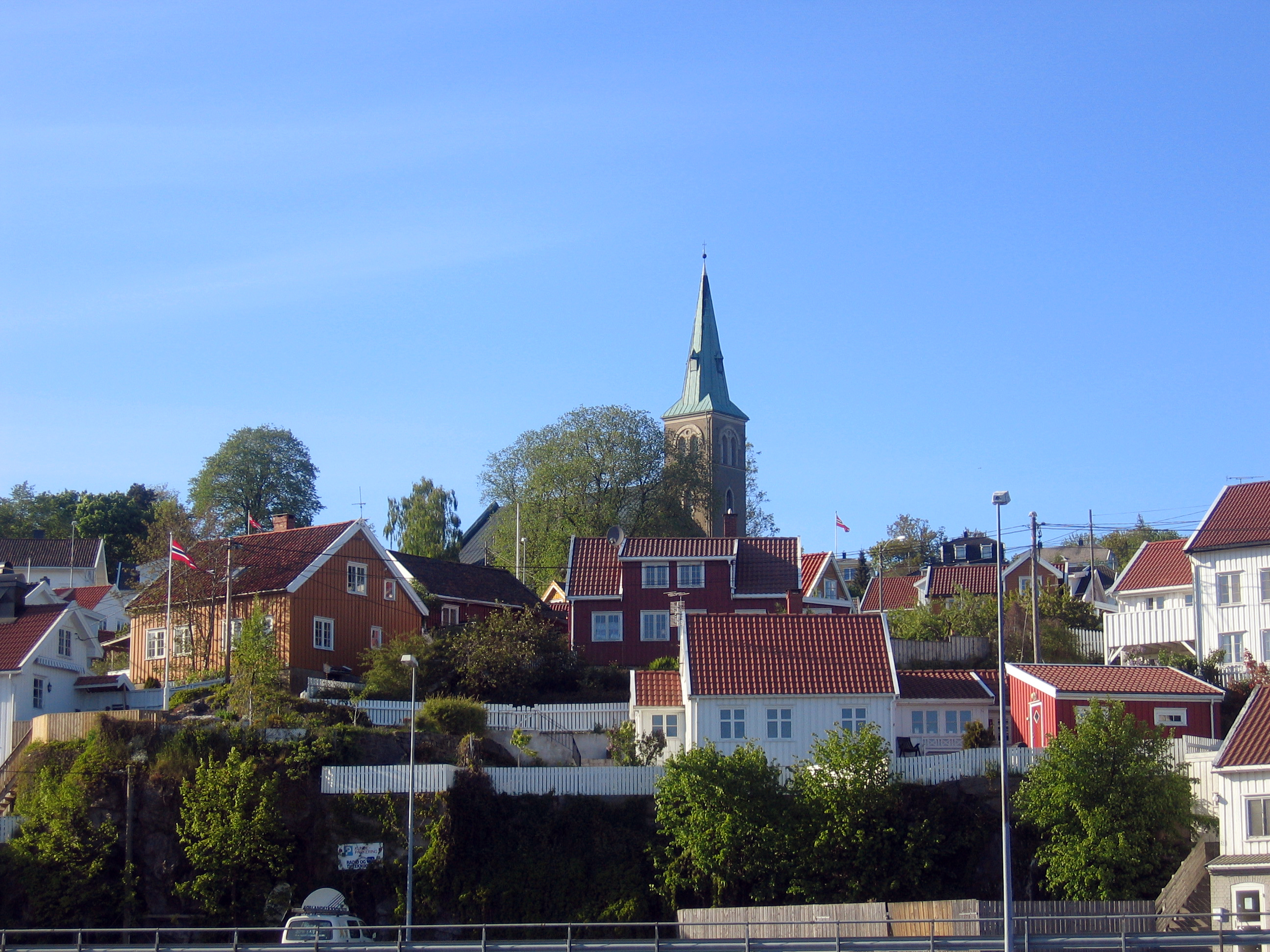

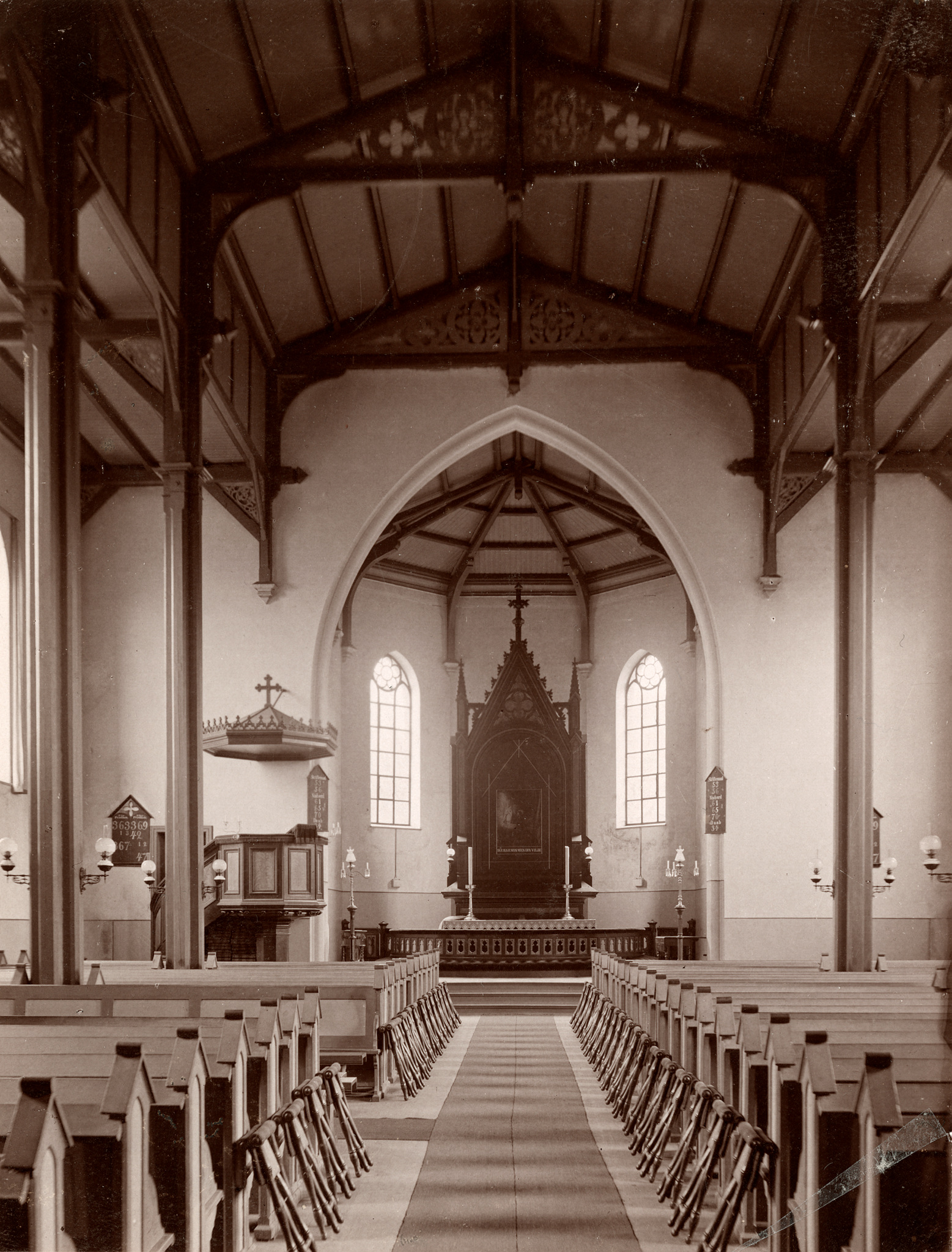

== See also ==
- List of churches in Agder og Telemark
