= Eshkali Seyyedi =

Neighborhood in Bushehr province, Iran

Eshkali Seyyedi Persian: اشکالی سیدی
- Neighborhood
- Location within Iran
- Country: Iran
- Province: Bushehr
- County: Tangestan
- District: Central
- Rural District: Ahram
- Village: Eshkali

Population (2016)
  - Total: 99
- Time zone: UTC+3:30 (IRST)

Eshkali Seyyedi (Persian: اشکالی سیدی) (Note: Also romanized as Eshkālī Seyyedī; also known as Aḩshām-e Seyyed) is a neighborhood in the village of Eshkali in Ahram Rural District of the Central District in Tangestan County, Bushehr province, Iran.

== Demographics ==
=== Population ===
At the time of the 2006 National Census, Eshkali Seyyedi's population was 59 in 12 households, when it was a village in Ahram Rural District. The following census in 2011 counted 76 people in 20 households. The 2016 census measured the population of the village as 99 people in 28 households.

In 2021, the villages of Eshkali Avaz Hoseyn, Eshkali Mohammad Hajji, Eshkali Seyyedi, and Eshkali Zayer Hoseyn merged in the formation of the village of Eshkali.
