= Bu ol Kheyr Rural District =

Rural district in Bushehr province, Iran

Bu ol Kheyr Rural District Persian: دهستان بوالخير
- Rural District
- Location within Iran
- Coordinates: 28°28′N 51°11′E
- Country: Iran
- Province: Bushehr
- County: Tangestan
- District: Delvar
- Established: 1986
- Capital: Bu ol Kheyr

Population (2016)
  - Total: 11,604
- Time zone: UTC+3:30 (IRST)

Bu ol Kheyr Rural District (Persian: دهستان بوالخير) is in Delvar District (Note: Formerly Saheli District) of Tangestan County, Bushehr province, Iran. Its capital is the village of Bu ol Kheyr.

== Demographics ==
=== Population ===
At the time of the 2006 National Census, the rural district's population was 9,707 in 2,287 households. There were 10,547 inhabitants in 2,761 households at the following census of 2011. The 2016 census measured the population of the rural district as 11,604 in 3,378 households. The most populous of its 17 villages was Ameri, with 2,581 people.

=== Other villages in the rural district ===
- Bonju
- Karri
- Khvor-e Shahabi
- Rostami
