= Delvar Rural District =

Rural district in Bushehr province, Iran

Delvar Rural District Persian: دهستان دلوار
- Rural District
- Location within Iran
- Coordinates: 28°49′N 51°04′E
- Country: Iran
- Province: Bushehr
- County: Tangestan
- District: Delvar
- Established: 1986
- Capital: Delvar

Population (2016)
  - Total: 20,435
- Time zone: UTC+3:30 (IRST)

Delvar Rural District (Persian: دهستان دلوار) is in Delvar District (Note: Formerly Saheli District) of Tangestan County, Bushehr province, Iran. It is administered from the city of Delvar.

== Demographics ==
=== Population ===
At the time of the 2006 National Census, the rural district's population was 15,109 in 3,476 households. There were 17,903 inhabitants in 4,636 households at the following census of 2011. The 2016 census measured the population of the rural district as 20,435 in 5,857 households. The most populous of its 26 villages was Mohammad Ameri, with 2,499 people.

=== Other villages in the rural district ===
- Chah Talekh-e Shomali
- Gargur
- Gurak-e Kalleh Bandi
- Gurak-e Khvorshidi
- Gurak-e Sadat
- Jainag
- Pahlavan Koshi
- Sartal. (Note: Formerly Ahsham-e Sartal)
