= Baghak Rural District =

Rural district in Bushehr province, Iran

Baghak Rural District Persian: دهستان باغك
- Rural District
- Location within Iran
- Coordinates: 28°52′N 51°12′E
- Country: Iran
- Province: Bushehr
- County: Tangestan
- District: Central
- Established: 1986
- Capital: Shureki

Population (2016)
  - Total: 12,483
- Time zone: UTC+3:30 (IRST)

Baghak Rural District (Persian: دهستان باغك) is in the Central District of Tangestan County, Bushehr province, Iran. Its capital is the village of Shureki.

== Demographics ==
=== Population ===
At the time of the 2006 National Census, the rural district's population was 12,087 in 2,803 households. There were 12,637 inhabitants in 3,363 households at the following census of 2011. The 2016 census measured the population of the rural district as 12,483 in 3,653 households. The most populous of its 36 villages was Boneh Gaz, with 3,254 people.

=== Other villages in the rural district ===
- Ahmadabad
- Ali Hoseyni
- Baghak-e Jonubi
- Baghak-e Shomali
- Qaba Kolaki
