= Delvar District =

District in Bushehr province, Iran

Delvar District Persian: بخش دلوار
- District
- Location within Iran
- Coordinates: 28°37′N 51°08′E
- Country: Iran
- Province: Bushehr
- County: Tangestan
- Capital: Delvar

Population (2016)
  - Total: 36,481
- Time zone: UTC+3:30 (IRST)

Delvar District (Persian: بخش دلوار) (Note: Formerly Saheli District (بخش ساحلی)) is in Tangestan County, Bushehr province, Iran. Its capital is the city of Delvar.

== Demographics ==
=== Population ===
At the time of the 2006 National Census, the district's population was 28,017 in 6,486 households. The following census in 2011 counted 32,154 people in 8,319 households. The 2016 census measured the population of the district as 36,481 inhabitants living in 10,473 households.

=== Administrative divisions ===
Delvar District Population
Administrative Divisions	2006	2011	2016
Bu ol Kheyr RD	9,707	10,547	11,604
Delvar RD	15,109	17,903	20,435
Delvar (city)	3,201	3,704	4,442
Total	28,017	32,154	36,481
RD = Rural District
