= List of Swedish billionaires by net worth =

Annual ranking by net worth by Forbes magazine

This is a ranking of Swedish billionaires. The following list is based on the annual wealth and assets assessment of the world's billionaires compiled and published by American business magazine Forbes which included 45 Swedes whose net worth exceeds $1 billion in 2025.

== 2025 list ==
The forty-five billionaires are listed as follows, including their Sweden rank (S#) and world rank (W#), citizenship, age, net worth, and source of wealth:

S#	W#	Name	Citizenship	Age (y.o.)	Net worth (billions of USD)	Source of wealth	Ref.
1	108	Stefan Persson	Sweden	79	18.6	H&M	
2	199	Antonia Ax:son Johnson	Sweden	83	12	Diversified	
3	213	Martin Lorentzon	Sweden	57	11.4	Spotify	
4	236	Finn Rausing	Sweden	71–72	10.7	Packaging: Tetra Laval	
5	236	Jörn Rausing	Sweden	66	10.7	Packaging: Tetra Laval	
6	236	Kirsten Rausing	Sweden	74	10.7	Packaging: Tetra Laval	
7	248	Carl Bennet	Sweden	74–75	10.6	Investments	
8	382	Fredrik Lundberg	Sweden	75	8	Real estate, investments	
9	401	Daniel Ek	Sweden	43	7.8	Spotify	
10	453	Carl Douglas	Sweden	61	7.2	Investments	
11	474	Eric Douglas	Sweden	58	7	Investments	
12	569	Frederik Paulsen Jr	Sweden	76	6.1	Health care	
13	620	Sofia Högberg Schörling	Sweden	46–47	5.7	Investments	
14	620	Märta Schörling Andreen	Sweden	40–41	5.7	Investments	
15	887	Roger Samuelsson	Sweden	61–62	4.1	Drug delivery devices	
16	887	Erik Selin	Sweden	58–59	4.1	Real estate	
17	902	Torbjörn Törnqvist	Sweden	72–73	4	Oil trading	
18	1172	Dan Olsson	Sweden	78–79	3.1	Diversified	
19	1362	Ali Ghodsi	Sweden	46–47	2.7	Data analytics	
20	1408	Bertil Hult	Sweden	85	2.6	Education	
21	1408	Lottie Tham & family	Sweden	77	2.6	H&M	
22	1573	Katarina Martinson	Sweden	45	2.3	Investments	
23	1626	Elisabeth Douglas	Sweden	83–84	2.2	Investments	
24	1626	Louise Lindh	Sweden	46–47	2.2	Investments	
25	1688	Stefan Olsson	Sweden	76–77	2.1	Diversified	
26	1850	Conni Jonsson	Sweden	66	1.9	Asset management	
27	2019	Jenny Lindén Urnes	Sweden	55	1.7	Powdered metal	
28	2019	David Mindus	Sweden	53–54	1.7	Real estate	
29	2019	Karl-Johan Persson	Sweden	51	1.7	H&M	
30	2019	Anton Osika	Sweden	36	1.6	Lovable	
31	2019	Fabian Hedin	Sweden	27	1.6	Lovable	
32	2110	Tom Persson	Sweden	41	1.6	H&M	
33	2110	Charlotte Söderström	Sweden	48–49	1.6	H&M	
34	2233	Thomas von Koch	Sweden	59–60	1.5	Asset management	
35	2479	Fredrik Österberg	Sweden	54–55	1.3	Gambling products	
36	2479	Per Sandberg	Sweden	63–64	1.3	Pharmaceuticals	
37	2479	Markus Persson	Sweden	47	1.3	Computer games	
38	2623	Sven Hagströmer	Sweden	82	1.2	Financial services	
39	2623	Karl Hedin	Sweden	75–76	1.2	Lumber	
40	2623	Victor Jacobsson	Sweden	43–44	1.2	Fintech	
41	2623	Thomas Sandell	Sweden	65–66	1.2	Hedge funds	
42	2623	Jens von Bahr	Sweden	54–55	1.2	Gambling products	
43	2790	Per Franzén	Sweden	48–49	1.1	Private equity	
44	2790	Jonas Kamprad	Sweden	59–60	1.1	IKEA	
45	2790	Mathias Kamprad	Sweden	57	1.1	IKEA	
46	2790	Peter Kamprad	Sweden	62	1.1	IKEA	
47	2933	Caspar Callerström	Sweden	51–52	1	Financial services	
