= Moelven =

Moelv, Moelven, or Moelva may refer to:

== Places ==
- Moelv, a town in Ringsaker Municipality in Innlandet county, Norway
- Moelv Station, a railway station in the town of Moelv in Ringsaker Municipality in Innlandet county, Norway
- Moelva (Ringsaker), a river in Ringsaker Municipality in Innlandet county, Norway
- Moelva (Agder), a river in Birkenes and Lillesand municipalities in Agder county, Norway

== Other ==
- Moelven Industrier, a Norwegian company
- Moelven IL, a sports club in Ringsaker Municipality in Innlandet county, Norway

== See also ==
- Moälven, a river in Sweden
