= Mollestad =

Village in Birkenes Municipality, Norway

Mollestad Vestre Mollestad / Østre Mollestad
- Village
- Interactive map of Mollestad
- Coordinates: 58.3187°N 08.1876°E
- Country: Norway
- Region: Southern Norway
- County: Agder
- Municipality: Birkenes Municipality
- Elevation: 35 m (115 ft)
- Time zone: UTC+01:00 (CET)
  - Summer (DST): UTC+02:00 (CEST)
- Post Code: 4760 Birkeland

Mollestad is a village in Birkenes Municipality in Agder county, Norway. The village is located on both sides of the river Tovdalselva, just south of the municipal centre of Birkeland. The Birkenes Church is located in eastern Mollestad (Østre Mollestad). The Norwegian National Road 41 runs through the village. The village of Rugsland lies to the south, the village of Svaland lies to the west, and the village of Tveide lies to the east.

== See also ==
- Mollestad Oak
