= Holmen (company) =

Swedish forest industry company 1875-

Holmen AB
- Company type: Aktiebolag
- Traded as: Nasdaq Stockholm: HOLM A, HOLM B
- Industry: Forestry products
- Founded: 1875; 151 years ago (MoDo)
- Headquarters: Stockholm, Sweden
- Key people: Fredrik Lundberg (Chairman of the board); Henrik Sjölund (President and CEO)
- Products: Printing paper, sawn timber, paperboard
- Number of employees: 2,976 (2017)
- Website: https://www.holmen.com/

Holmen AB is a Swedish company which bases its business in the forest industry and the pulp and paper industry. Holmen's main products are paperboard for consumer packaging and graphical applications. Printing paper for magazines, supplements, direct mail, directories, books and newspapers. Holmen also produce sawn timber for flooring, window components, furniture or construction.

== History ==
Holmen was originally called Mo och Domsjö AB (MoDo), a Swedish company created in 1874. Carl Kempe (1799-1872), a Pomeranian-born merchant, originally partnered with his brother-in-law, but was from 1836 single owner of a sawmill in Mo, at the river Moälven, near Örnsköldsvik in northern Sweden. Carl Kempe later established a steam-powered sawmill at Domsjö on Moälven. The latter has been running as an independent company called Domsjö Fabriker since 2000, and in 2011 it was acquired by India's Aditya Birla Group.

The company Mo och Domsjö AB was created in 1874 by Carl Kempe's sons from these holdings, among several other industries controlled by the Kempe family. It was led at various times by the brothers Bernhard (1830-1908), Wilhelm and Frans Kempe (1847-1924) and remained in the control of the Kempe family for most of the next century.

Originally producing and exporting timber, the company moved into pulp and paper at the end of the 19th and early years of the 20th century and into wood-based chemicals during the middle part of the 20th century. The name was usually abbreviated to Modo and has since 1963 through sponsoring given its name to the ice hockey team Modo Hockey.

The company was merged with the Norrköping-based industrial company Holmens Bruk AB in 1988 under the name Mo och Domsjö AB.

In February 2000, the group changed its name to Holmen AB.

In June 2016 the newsprint mill in Madrid, Spain, was sold to International Paper.

== Organisation ==
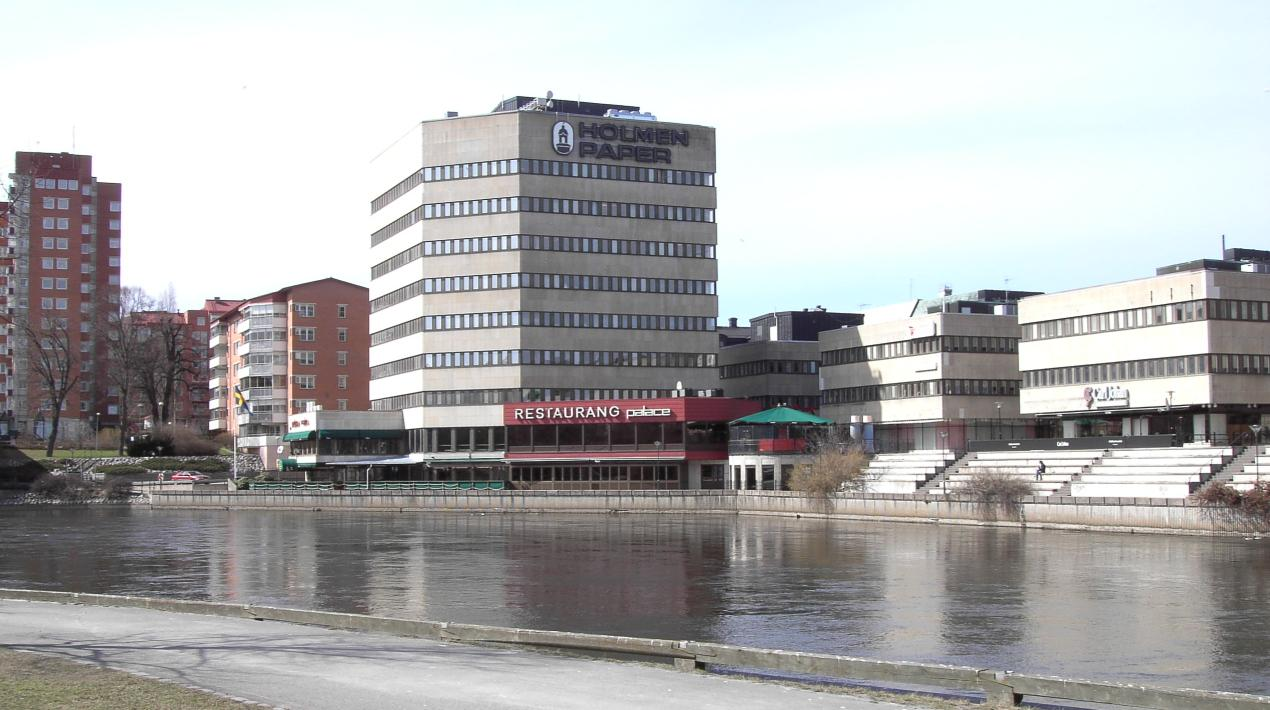
The Holmen Paper headquarters in Norrköping, Sweden

Holmen consists of several subsidiaries: Holmen Board and Paper, Holmen Trävaror (eng: Wood Products), Holmen Skog and Holmen Energi. The largest one is Holmen Board and Paper with a total of four paper and paperboard mills in Sweden; Hallsta, Iggesund and Braviken in Sweden as well as one mill in Workington, UK.

== Sustainability ==
In January 2017 Holmen was ranked number 21 on the Global 100.

== Owners ==
The largest owner in Holmen is L E Lundbergföretagen, controlled by billionaire Fredrik Lundberg with 32.9% of the shares and 61.6% of the total vote.

== Markets ==
The European market makes up about 88% of Holmen's total net sales. Holmen's single largest market is Sweden, with 24% of the net sales.

== Products ==
The business area Iggesund Paperboard produces paperboard for use in the premium packaging and graphics sectors. The brands consist of Invercote and Inverform produced at the Iggesund Mill and Incada produced at the Workington Mill.

The business area Holmen Paper produces paper for magazines, catalogues, direct mail, supplements, book paper and gift wrap at the two paper mills. The brands include: Holmen TRND, Holmen VIEW, Holmen UNIQ, Holmen NEWS, Holmen GIFT, Holmen XLNT, Holmen PLUS and Holmen BOOK.

The business area Holmen Timber makes construction timber and joinery timber at three sawmills in Sweden.
