= Moälven (ship) =

Swedish tugboat

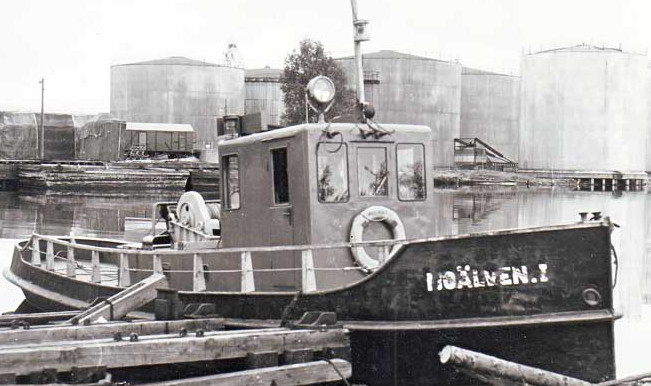
- Moälven, Sweden

History

Sweden
- Name: Moälven
- Owner: Mo och Domsjö, Örnsköldsvik, Sweden 1921 – about 1970; Private owners from about 1970
- Ordered: 1920
- Builder: Jerfeds Mekaniska Verkstad, Bonäset, Örnsköldsviks kommun
- Completed: 1921
- Status: In service

General characteristics
- Type: Tugboat
- Tonnage: 14 NRT
- Length: 14 m (45 ft 11 in)
- Installed power: Bolinder-Munktell BM 1113 diesel engine
- Propulsion: Stern propeller
- Speed: 6 knots (11 km/h; 6.9 mph)

Moälven was a Swedish tugboat built 1921 for Mo och Domsjö in Örnsköldsvik, Sweden and in use up to about 1970.

She was launched in 1921 as Moälven and was a conventionally-built timber rafting tugboat at Jerfeds Mekaniska Verkstad in Örnsköldsvik Municipality, in Västernorrland County, Sweden. Moälven was owned and used by the Mo och Domsjö company to pull logs rafted for towing from the areas along the river Moälven down to Domsjö Fabriker in Örnsköldsvik.

She was sold to a private owner and converted from a timber tugboat to a pleasure craft around 1970.

== Gallery ==
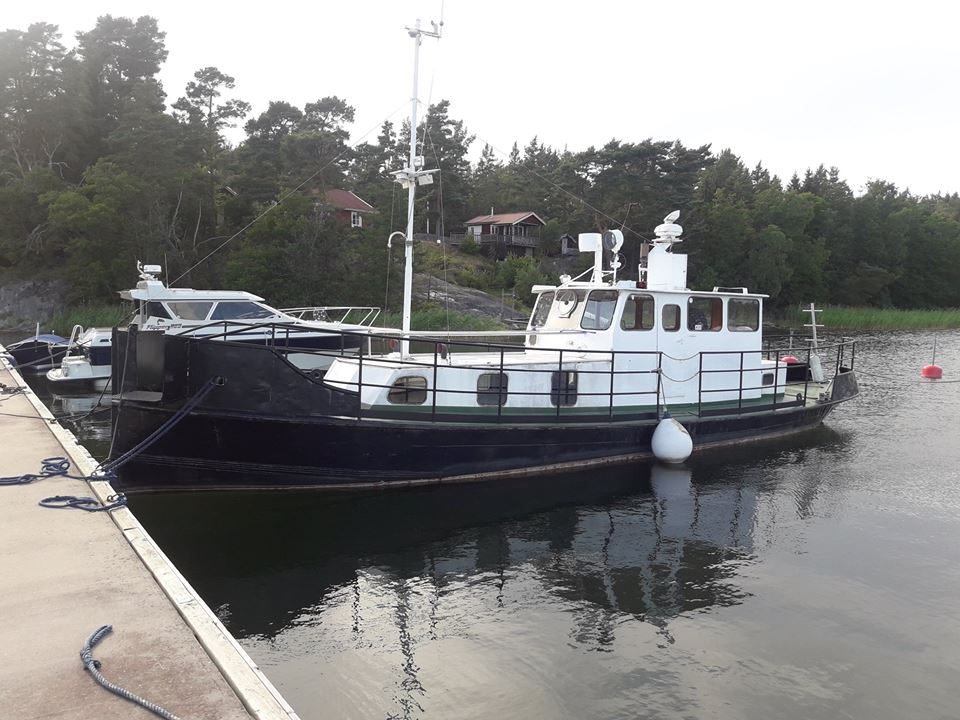
Boat in 2017
