= Rugsland =

Village in Birkenes Municipality, Norway

- Village
- Interactive map of Rugsland
- Coordinates: 58.2895°N 08.1762°E
- Country: Norway
- Region: Southern Norway
- County: Agder
- Municipality: Birkenes Municipality
- Elevation: 34 m (112 ft)
- Time zone: UTC+01:00 (CET)
  - Summer (DST): UTC+02:00 (CEST)
- Post Code: 4760 Birkeland

Rugsland is a village in Birkenes Municipality in Agder county, Norway. The village is located on the western shore of the river Tovdalselva, about 5 kilometres (3.1 mi) south of the village of Mollestad. The village of Svaland lies about 5 kilometres (3.1 mi) to the northwest.
