= Moelva (Agder) =

Moelva Maa Elv (historic spelling)
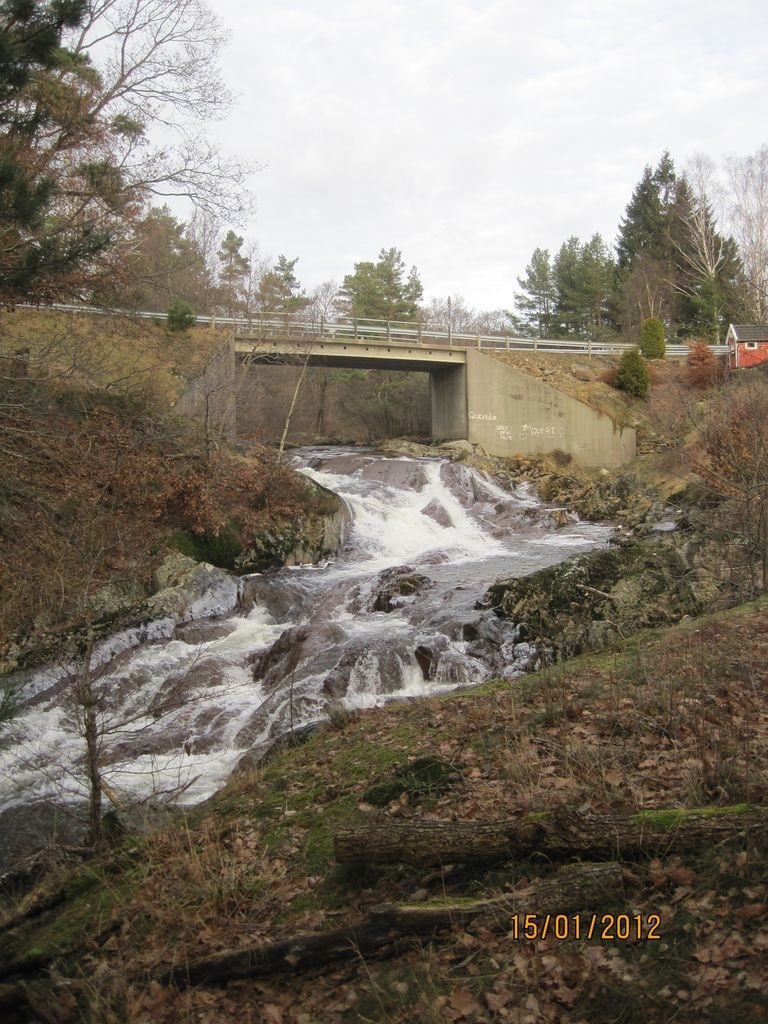
- View of the river

Location
- Country: Norway
- County: Agder
- Municipalities: Lillesand and Birkenes

Physical characteristics
- Source
  - location: Southern hill of Søndagsheia, Tveide
  - coordinates: 58.2812°N 8.2219°E
  - elevation: 175 metres (574 ft)
- Mouth
  - location: Tingsakerfjorden, Lillesand
  - coordinates: 58.2551°N 8.3883°E
  - elevation: 0 metres (0 ft)
- Length: 20.8 km (12.9 mi)
- Basin size: 3,454 km^{2} (1,334 sq mi)
- Discharge
  - average: 1.04 m^{3}/s (37 cu ft/s)

Basin features
- River system: Lillesand-Birkenes

Moelva is a river in Agder, Norway. The river flows through Birkenes Municipality and Lillesand Municipality. It originates from a hill south of Tveide in Birkenes Municipality and empties into the Tingsakerfjord, east of the town of Lillesand in Lillesand Municipality. Large parts of the disused, former railway Lillesand-Flaksvand Line followed the river bank.

An old stone bridge is still located by Helvetesfossen. It was restored by the Norwegian Public Roads Administration in 1993.

== Hydropower ==
The hydropower company Lillesand Elektrisitetsverk was started as a private company in 1916. There were dams in all tributaries to Moelva, dam at Helvetesfossen and pipeline down to the power station at Tingsaker, that had a turbine of 150 horsepower (110 kW), a generator of 125 kilowatts (168 hp), and an oil transformer of 7 kilowatts (9.4 hp). The power plant was sold and closed in 1970.

== Fishing ==
Moelva is a sea trout leader in the lower part. It is Lillesand Municipality that has been responsible for both the preparation and clearing of the riverbed and built a threshold dam in the lower part of the river. The sea trout population has recovered after a decline due to pollution.

== Gallery ==
Former power plant

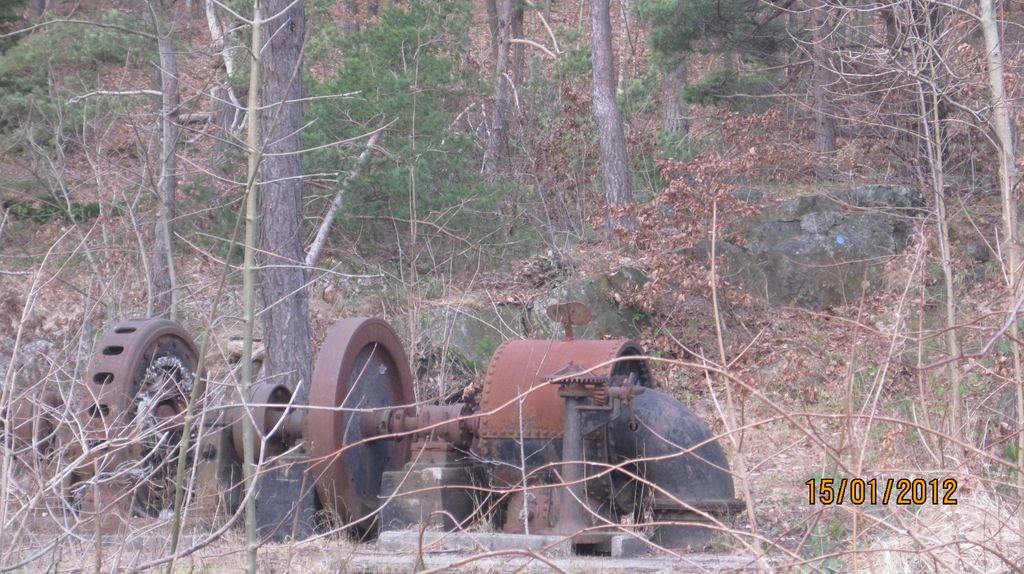
Old equipment from the power plant.

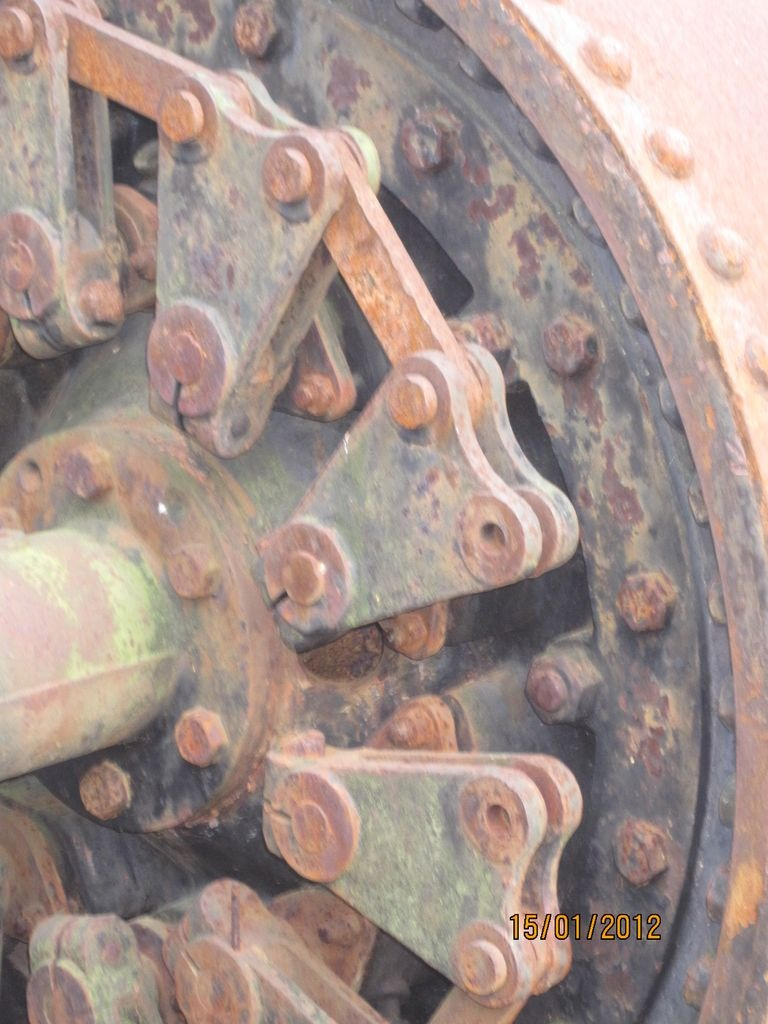
Preserved cultural monument from the former power plant.

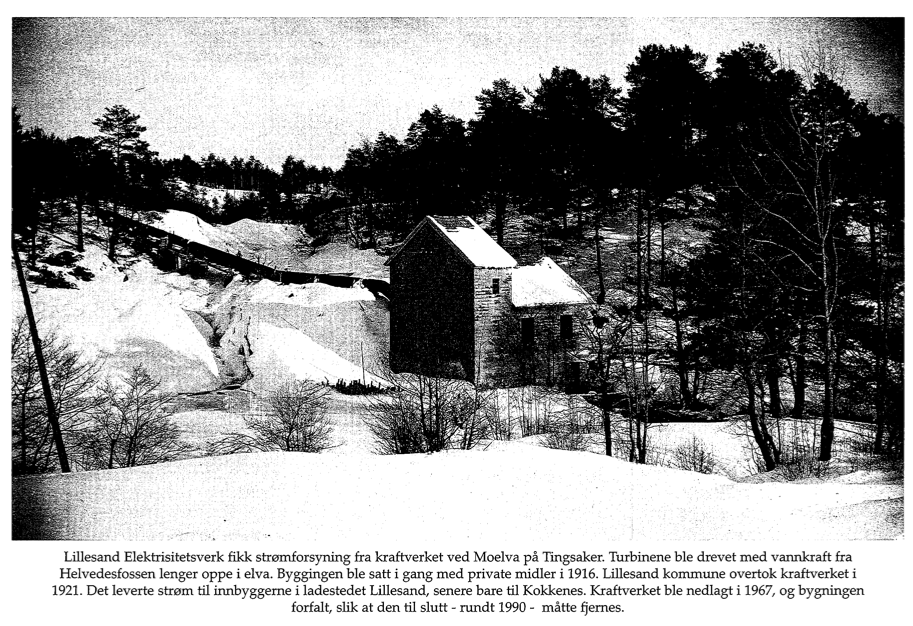
The power plant in 1917.

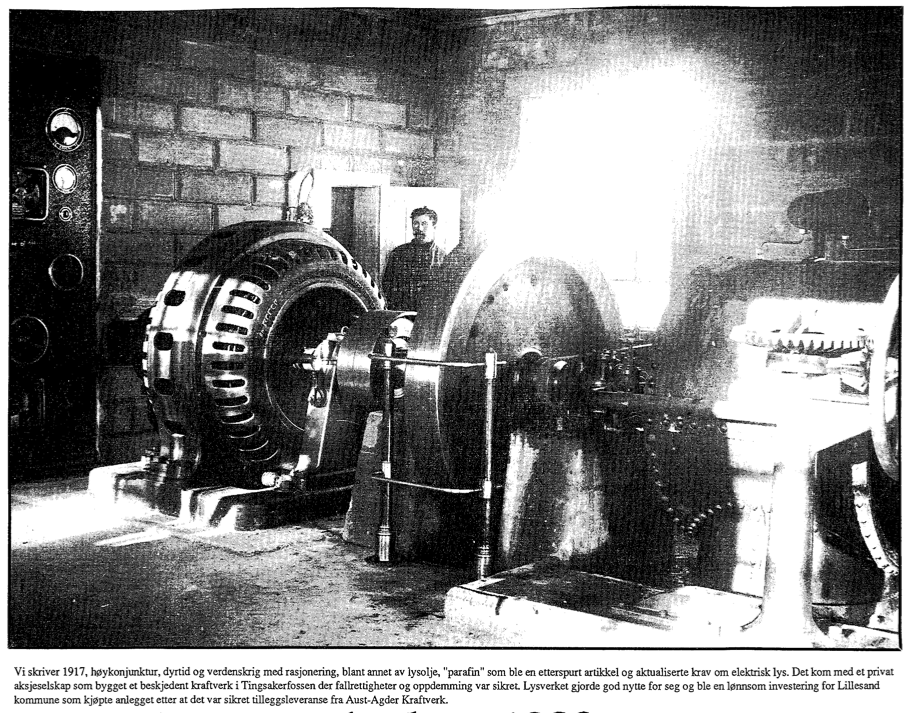
Interior of the power plant in 1917.

== See also ==
- List of rivers in Norway
