= Lars Erik Lundberg =

Swedish businessman

- Born: 4 July 1920; Norrköping, Sweden
- Died: 2001 (aged 80–81)
- Education: Stockholm Technical Institute
- Occupation: businessman
- Title: Founder and CEO of L E Lundbergforetagen
- Children: Fredrik Lundberg
- Relatives: Louise Lindh (granddaughter); Katarina Martinson (granddaughter)

Lars Erik Lundberg (4 July 1920 - 2001) was a Swedish businessman, the founder of L E Lundbergföretagen.

== Early life ==
Lars Erik Lundberg was born on 4 July 1920 in Norrköping. He received a bachelor's degree in civil engineering from the Stockholm Technical Institute.

== Career ==
In 1944, Lundberg founded L E Lundbergföretagen in Norrköping, as a construction company, building residential property, but diversified into other areas over time.

== Personal life ==
He died in 2001.

The company is now controlled by his son Fredrik Lundberg, and daughters Louise Lindh and Katarina Martinson, all billionaires.
