= Louise Lindh =

Swedish businesswoman (born 1979)

- Born: Louise Lundberg; 1979 (age 46–47)
- Occupation: Businesswoman
- Title: CEO of L E Lundbergforetagen's property division
- Spouse: Mr Lindh
- Parent: Fredrik Lundberg
- Relatives: Lars Erik Lundberg (grandfather); Katarina Martinson (sister)

Louise Lindh (born 1979) is a Swedish billionaire businesswoman. She owns 14% of L E Lundbergforetagen, the family's holding company, which owns property, pulp and paper companies, and was founded by her grandfather Lars Erik Lundberg. As of March 31, 2022, she held 1% of capital value, and 1.3% of the voting shares, of Industrivärden, a Nordic investment company.

She was born in 1979, the daughter of Fredrik Lundberg.

Lindh runs Lundbergforetagen's property division, and has been a director of L E Lundbergföretagen since 2010.

Lindh is married, and lives in Stockholm, Sweden.
