= Birkenes Church =

Church in Agder, Norway

- Birkenes kirke
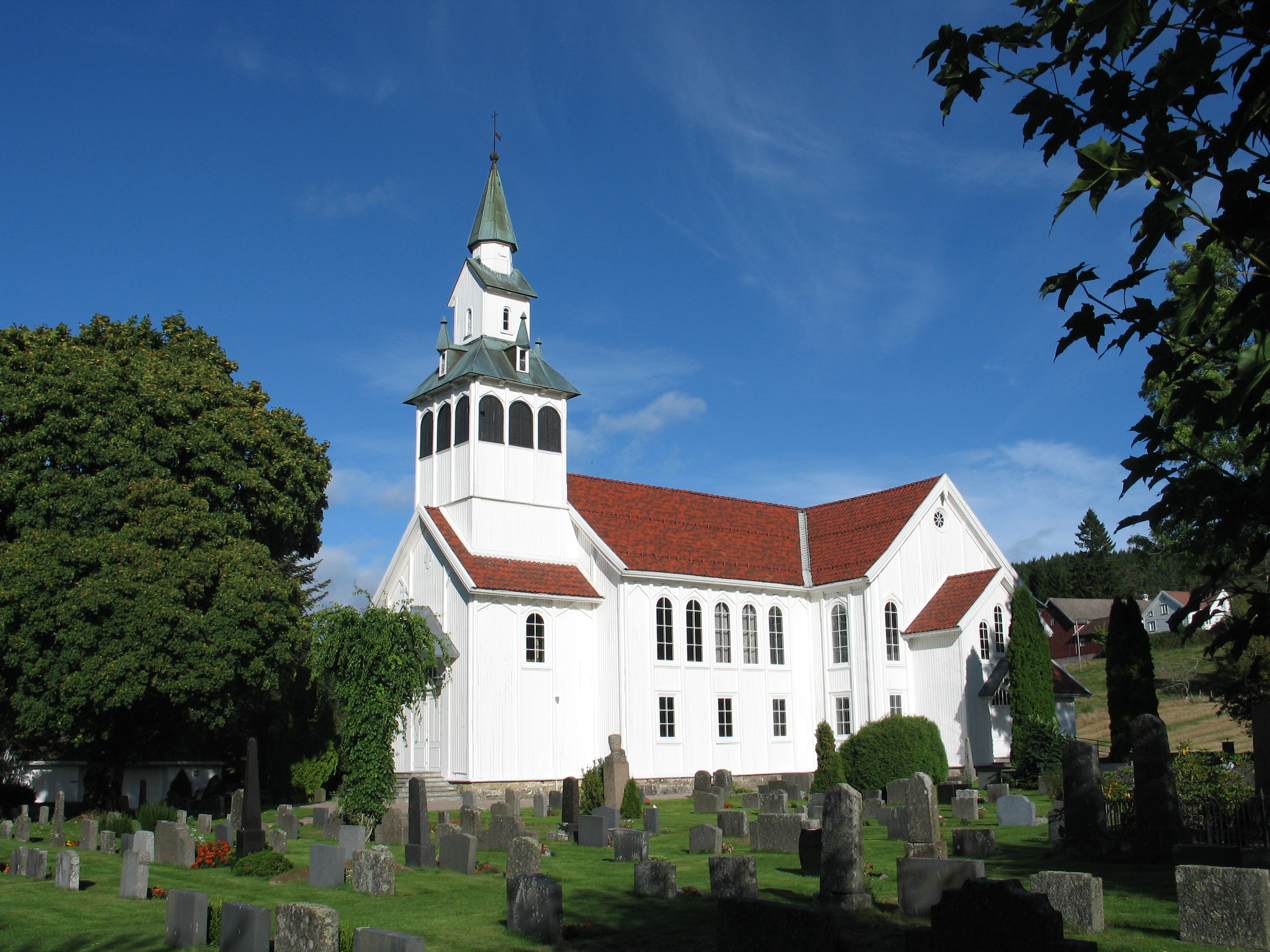
- View of the church
- Birkenes Church
- 58.311398°N 08.19018°E
- Location: Birkenes Municipality, Agder
- Country: Norway
- Denomination: Church of Norway
- Previous denomination: Catholic Church
- Churchmanship: Evangelical Lutheran

History
- Status: Parish church
- Founded: 12th century
- Consecrated: 1 Dec 1858

Architecture
- Functional status: Active
- Architect: Christian Heinrich Grosch
- Architectural type: Cruciform
- Completed: 1858 (168 years ago)

Specifications
- Capacity: 650
- Materials: Wood

Administration
- Diocese: Agder og Telemark
- Deanery: Vest-Nedenes prosti
- Parish: Birkenes
- Norwegian Cultural Heritage Site
- Type: Church
- Status: Listed
- ID: 83889

Birkenes Church (Norwegian: Birkenes kirke) is a parish church of the Church of Norway in Birkenes Municipality in Agder county, Norway. It is located in the village of Mollestad, about 3.5 kilometres (2.2 mi) southwest of the municipal centre of Birkeland. It is the church for the Birkenes parish which is part of the Vest-Nedenes prosti (deanery) in the Diocese of Agder og Telemark. The white, wooden church was built in a cruciform design in 1858 using plans drawn up by the architect Christian Heinrich Grosch. The church seats about 650 people.

== History ==
The earliest existing historical records of the church date back to the year 1344, but the church was not new that year, it was likely built in the 1100s. The first church on this site was a stone building that had a rectangular nave and a narrower, nearly square-shaped choir. Over the years, a wooden tower was added on the west end of the building. From 1660 to 1662, a new entry was constructed for the church and repairs to the tower were undertaken. During the 1680s, the church was whitewashed on the inside and outside. From 1723 until 1762, the church was sold into private ownership. In 1820, the tower was taken down and rebuilt. A sacristy was built in 1841. In 1858, the old church was torn down and a new wooden church was built on the same site. Some of the stone from its walls was reused in the foundation of a new church and to build stone walls surrounding the church cemetery. The new wooden church was consecrated on 1 December 1858 by the Bishop Jacob von der Lippe. In 1964, the zinc-covered tower was redone with a new copper roof. In 1987, the sacristy was enlarged to include a small kitchen.

=== Cemetery ===
The cemetery surrounds the church and it has been expanded several times. In 1888-1889, the main gate was moved from the west side to the east side, opposite the sacristy. There is also a gate on the south side. Starting in 1965, work was done to create a mortuary room under the sacristy. After much back and forth, a separate mortuary was built in 1970 using drawings by the architect Gabriel Tallaksen. In 1981, a tool house with a break room for cemetery workers was built as well.

== Media gallery ==
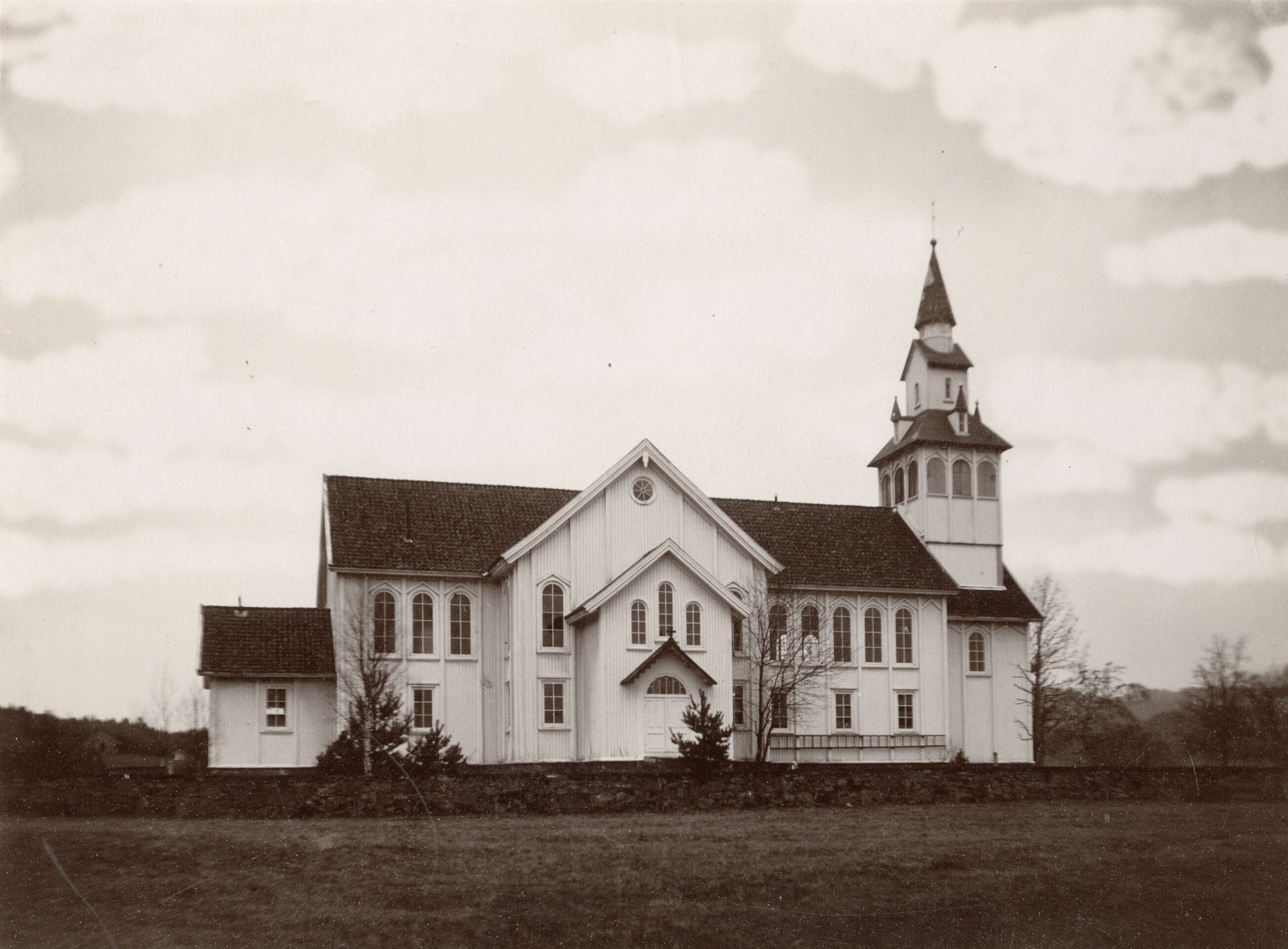
Historic view of the church

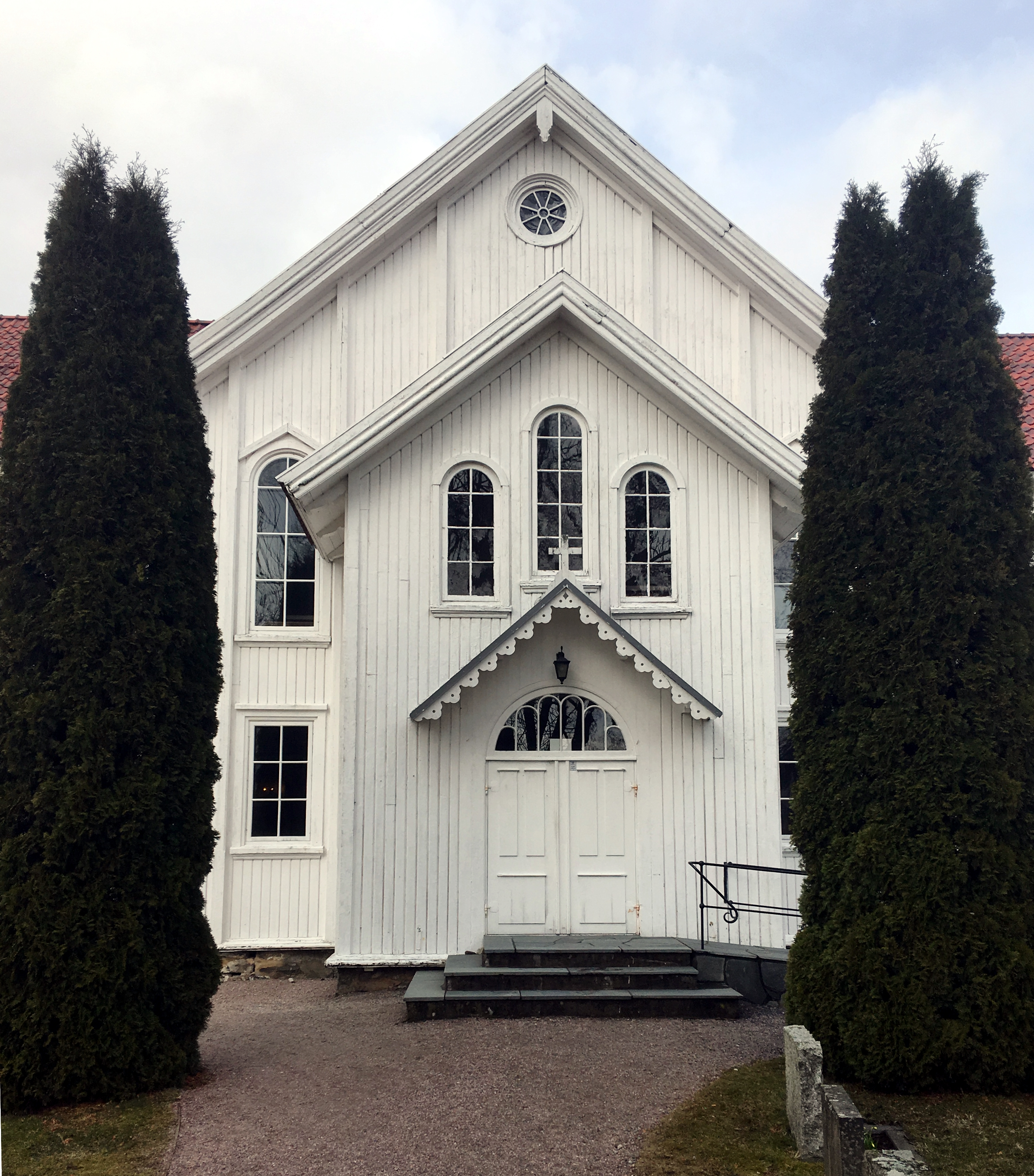
Entrance to the church

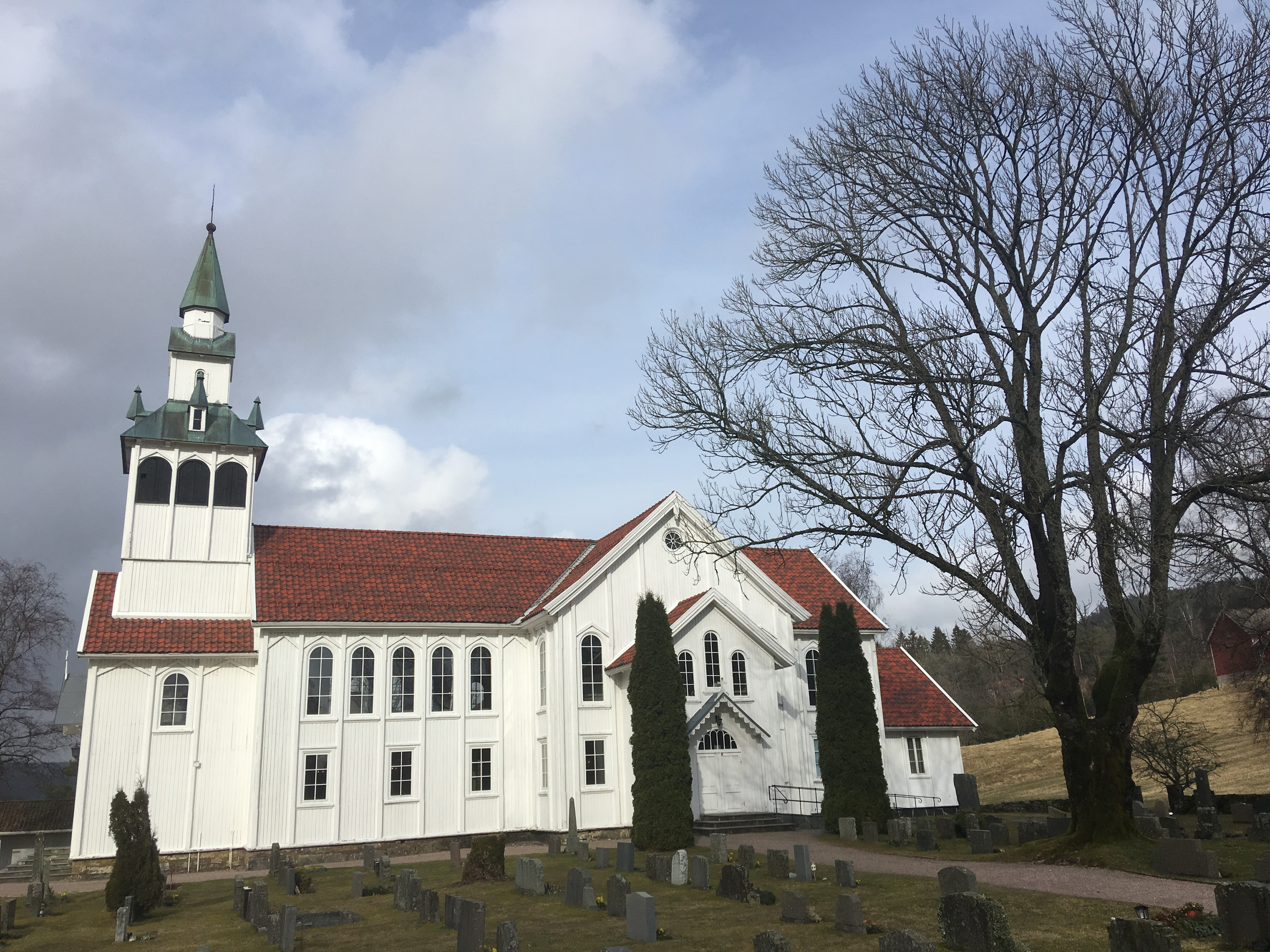
Side view of the church

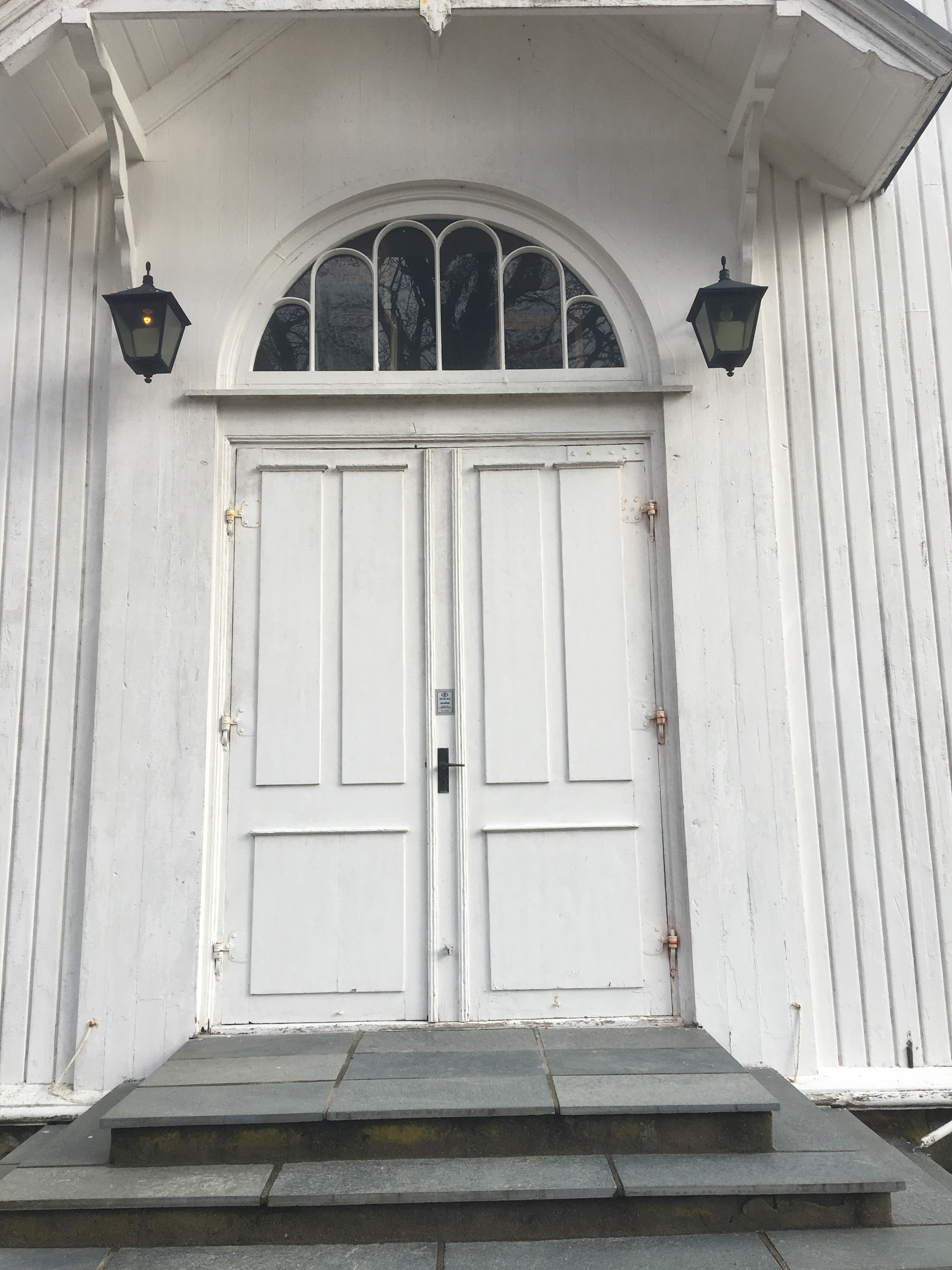
Main doors of the church

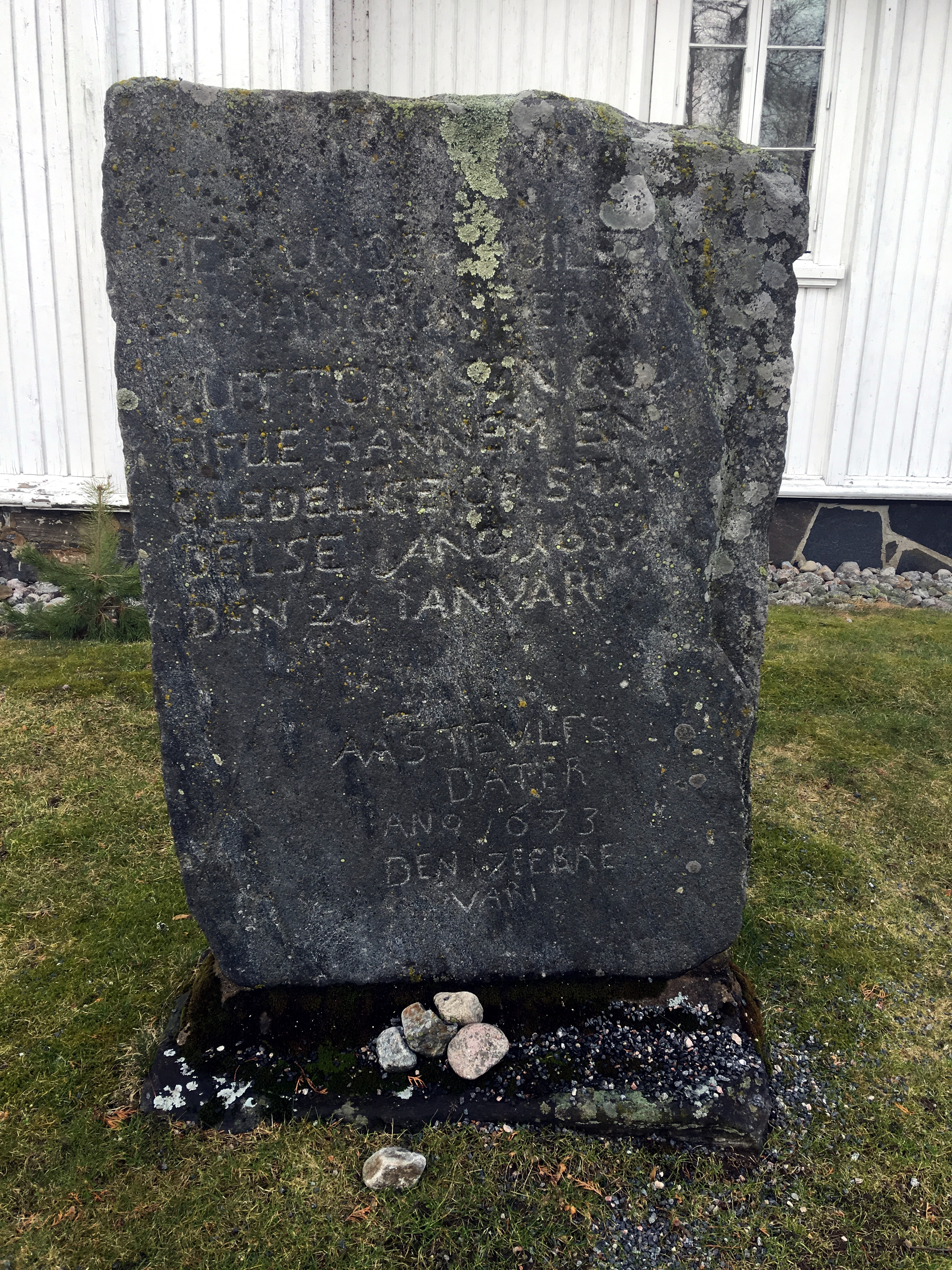
Gravestone from 1689 found in the floor of the old church that was torn down in 1858.

== See also ==
- List of churches in Agder og Telemark
