= Bolinder-Munktell =

Former Swedish tractor manufacturer

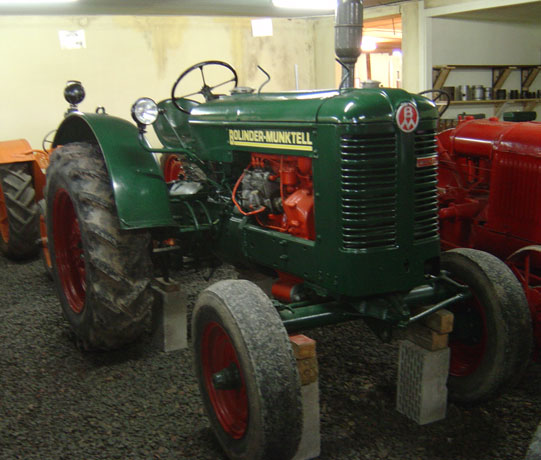
1950s BM tractor, model BM 35

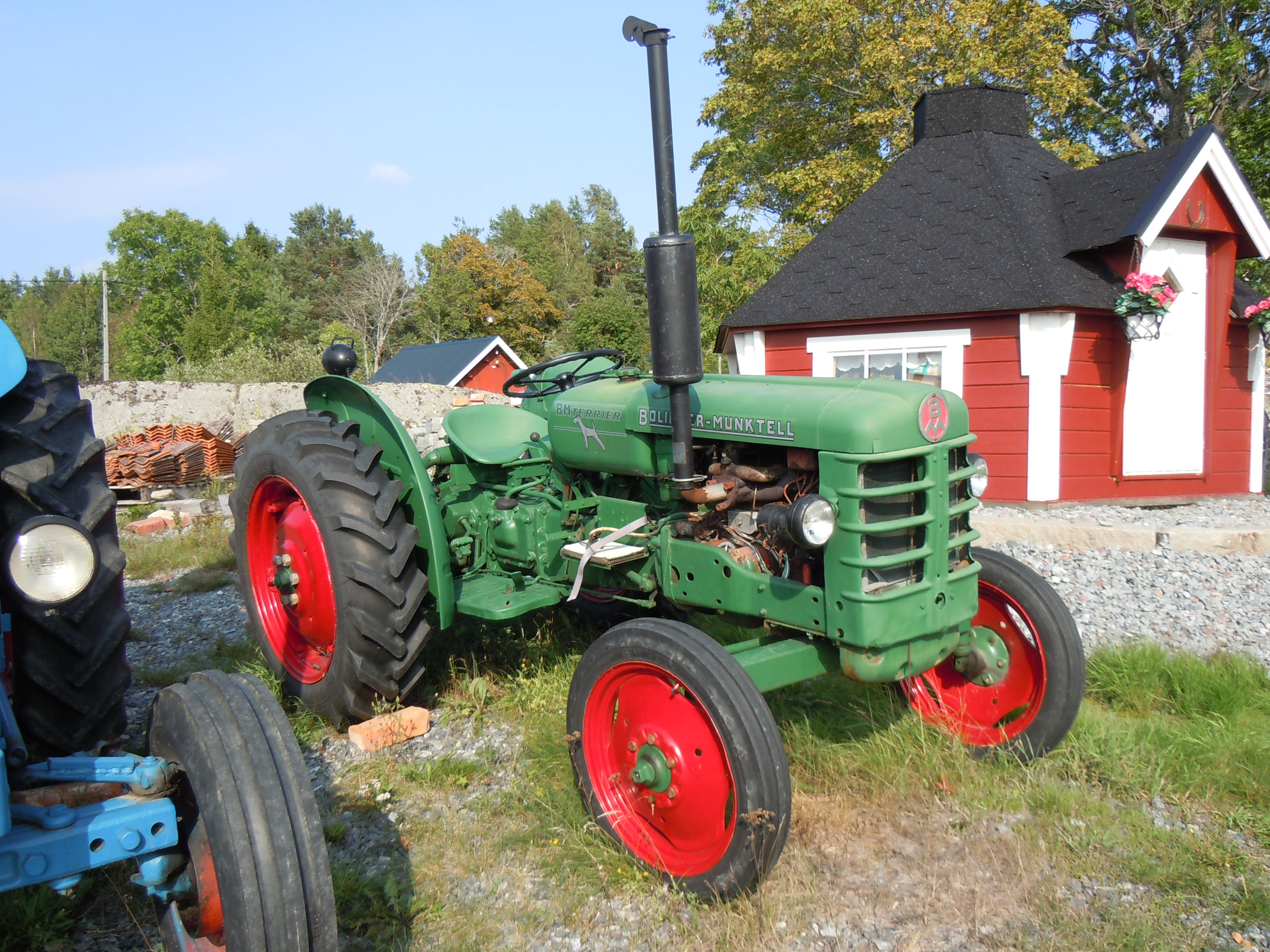
Bolinder-Munktell 425 Terrier

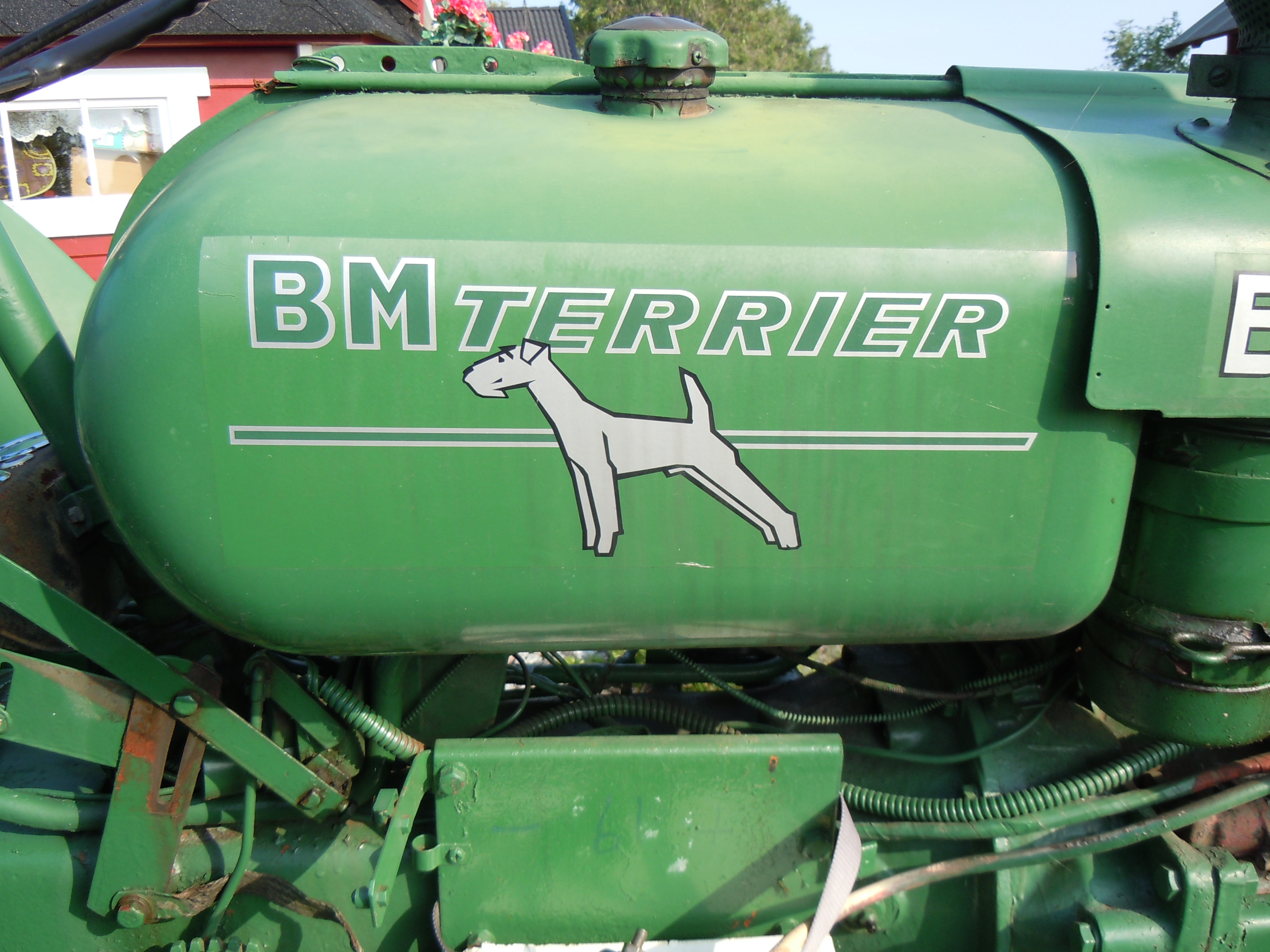
11 200 Terriers were built between 1957 and 1962

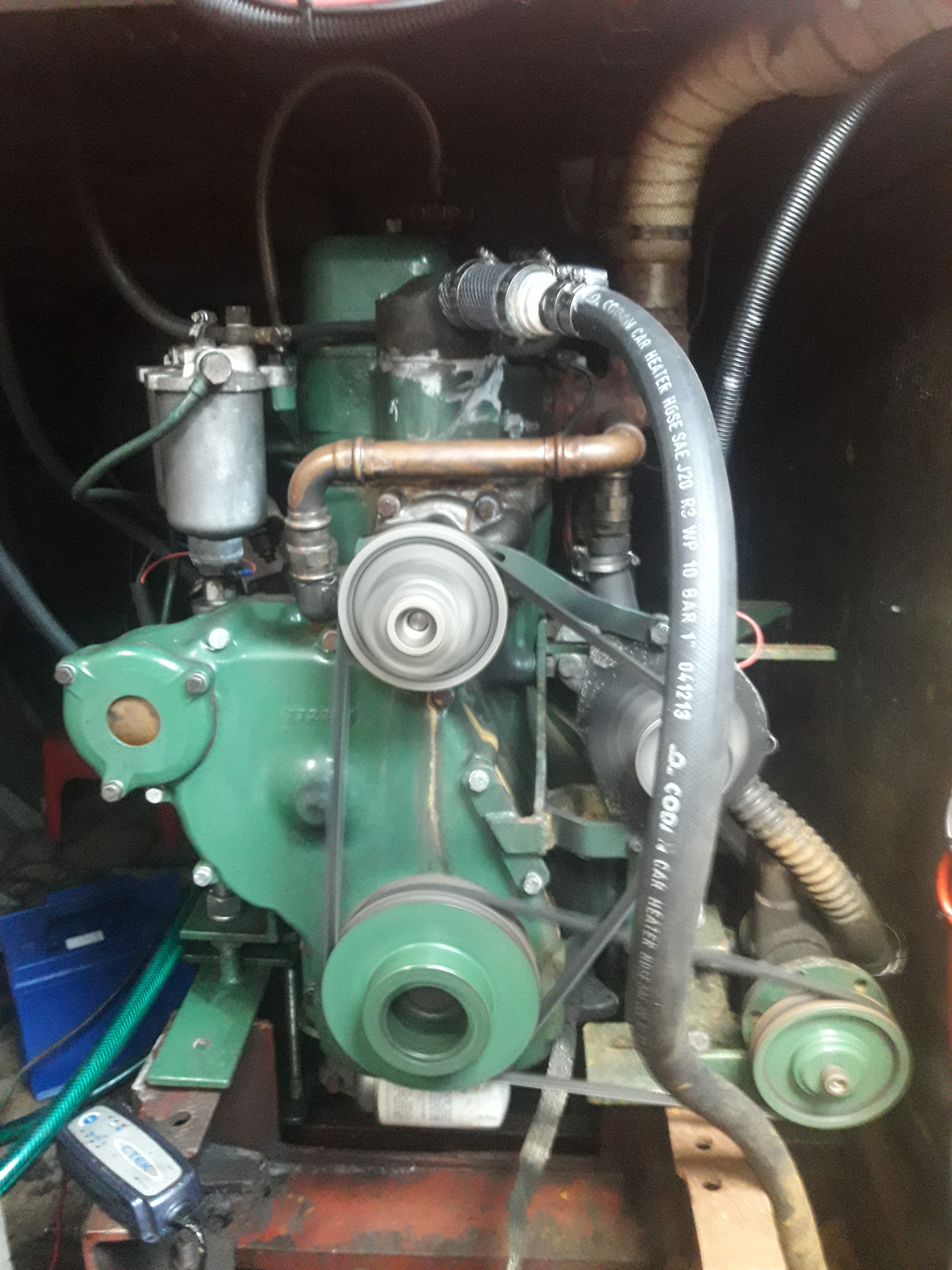
Bolinder-Munktell BM 1113 tractor engine, used in the ship Moälven

AB Bolinder-Munktell (BM) was a tractor and machines manufacturer founded in Eskilstuna, Sweden in 1932 through the merger of the mechanical companies Bolinders and Munktells Mekaniska Verkstad.

Bolinder are also well known as manufacturers of 'Semi-Diesel' or 'Hot bulb' engines.

In 1950 BM was bought by Volvo. In 1973 the company changed its name to Volvo BM AB and then in 1995 to Volvo Construction Equipment.

The product range has changed with the times. Up to the beginning of the 20th century agricultural machines such as threshers were an important product.

== Products ==
=== Marine engines ===
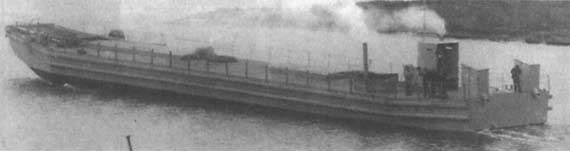
A Bolinder-class landing craft, a Russian ship class, named after the supplier of semi-diesel engines installed in them

Bolinder produced a wide range of marine engines, mostly of the semi-diesel (hot-bulb) type. Some of those sizes proved to be ideal in narrow boats, and some Bolinder motors are still in use for this purpose. When starting, the cylinder head has to be heated with a kerosene blowtorch to get the hot bulb heated, and to be able to start the combustion process.

=== Tractors ===
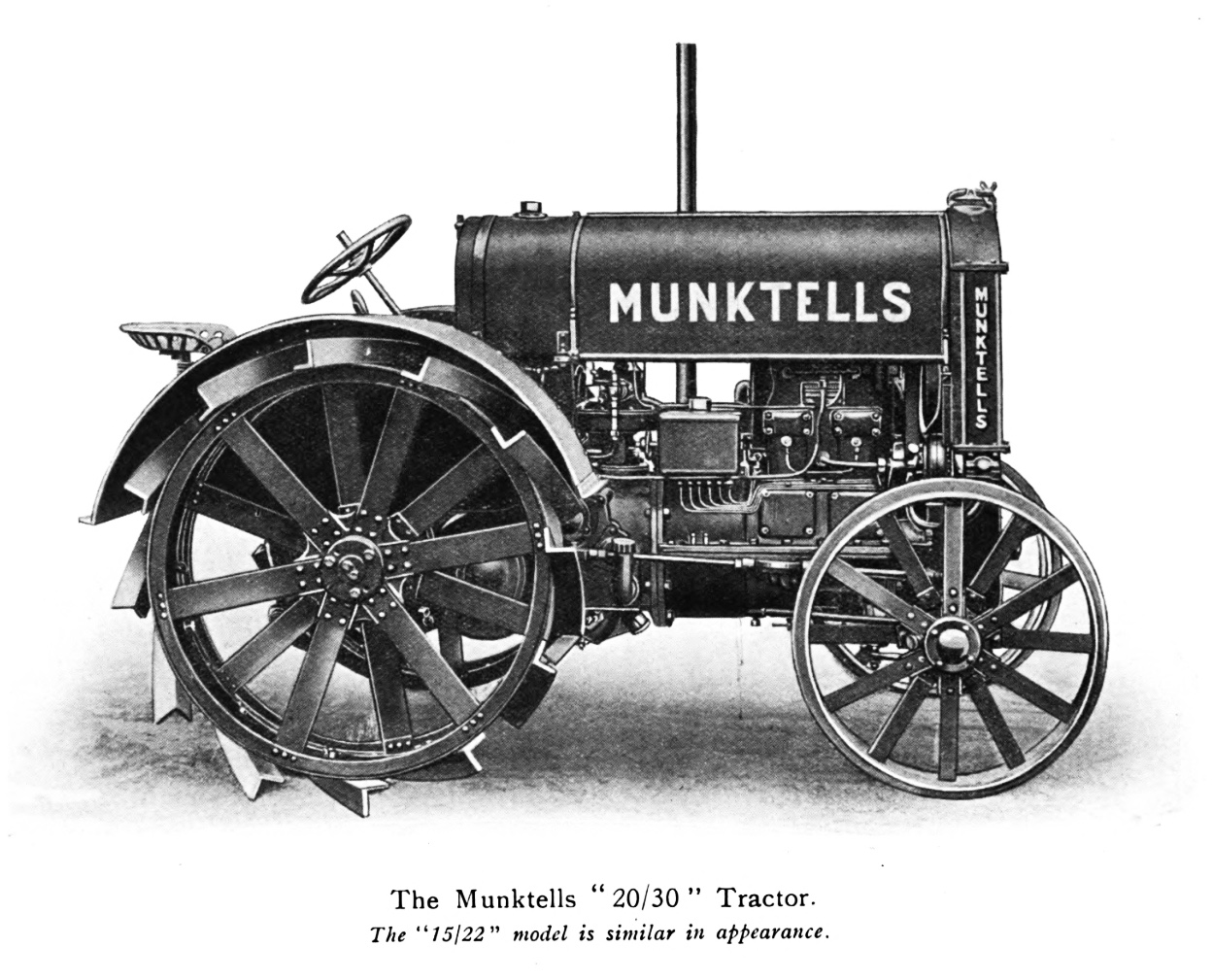
Munktell 20-30 (1927-1938)

Tractor production commenced in 1913, with the type 30-40. Tractors were the main product up to the 1970s, and gained an unsurpassed reputation for durability.

- Bolinder-Munktell BM 10 (1947-1952)
- Bolinder-Munktell BM 20 (1945-1950)
- Bolinder-Munktell BM 21 (1951-1952)
- Bolinder-Munktell BM 230 Viktor (1955-1961)
- Bolinder-Munktell BM 35/36 (1952-1959)

=== Construction equipment ===
From the 1950s new products in the construction equipment and forestry machinery categories emerged. These were initially based on the tractor chassis. Soon the construction equipment became the dominant product range and remains so today. Products developed in the 1960s, and still in production, are wheel loaders and articulated haulers.

== History ==
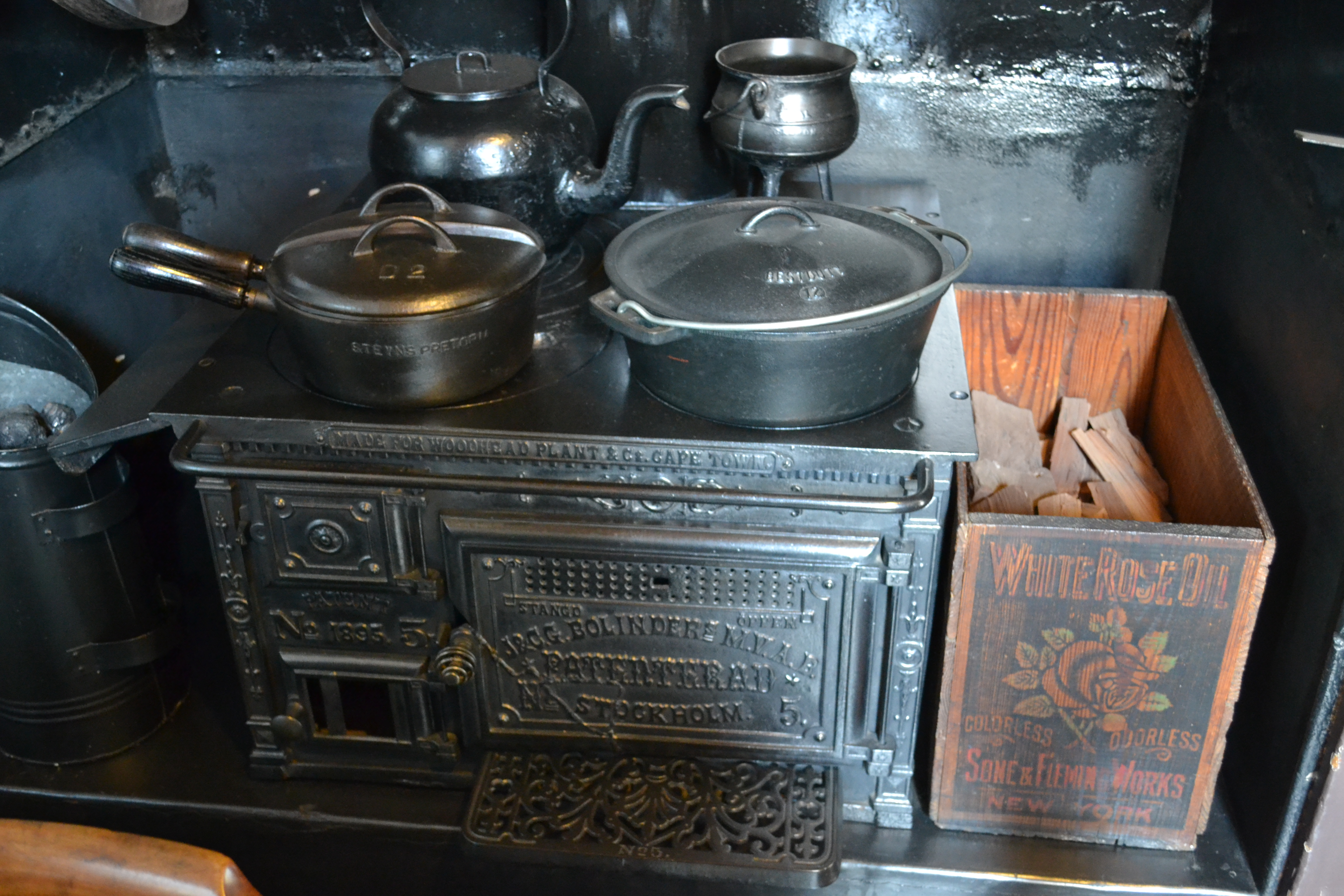
A J&C.G. Bolinders stove from 1895

Bolinder-Munktell traces its origins to the engineering workshops Munktells Mekaniska Verkstad AB (established in Eskilstuna by Johan Theofron Munktell in 1832) and J. & C.G. Bolinders Mekaniska Verkstad AB (established in Stockholm by Jean and Carl Gerhard Bolinder in 1845). In 1950 the main shareholder Handelsbanken sold its shares to Volvo who turned the company into a subsidiary.

== See also ==
- Bandvagn 202
