= Katarina Martinson =

Swedish billionaire businesswoman (born 1981)

- Born: Katarina Lundberg; 1981 (age 44–45)
- Education: Stockholm School of Economics
- Board member of: Husqvarna; L E Lundbergforetagen
- Spouse: Mr Martinson
- Parent: Fredrik Lundberg
- Relatives: Lars Erik Lundberg (grandfather); Louise Lindh (sister)

Katarina Martinson (born 1981) is a Swedish billionaire businesswoman. She owns 14% of L E Lundbergforetagen, the family holding company, which owns property, pulp and paper companies, and was founded by her grandfather Lars Erik Lundberg.

She was born in 1981, the daughter of Fredrik Lundberg. She has a master's degree from the Stockholm School of Economics.

She is a director of L E Lundbergforetagen.

Martinson is married, and lives in Stockholm, Sweden.
