= Moliden =

- Location within Västernorrland Location within Sweden
- Coordinates: 63°23′N 18°28′E
- Country: Sweden
- Province: Ångermanland
- County: Västernorrland County
- Municipality: Örnsköldsvik Municipality

Area
  - Total: 0.63 km^{2} (0.24 sq mi)

Population (31 December 2010)
  - Total: 300
  - Density: 476/km^{2} (1,230/sq mi)
- Time zone: UTC+1 (CET)
  - Summer (DST): UTC+2 (CEST)

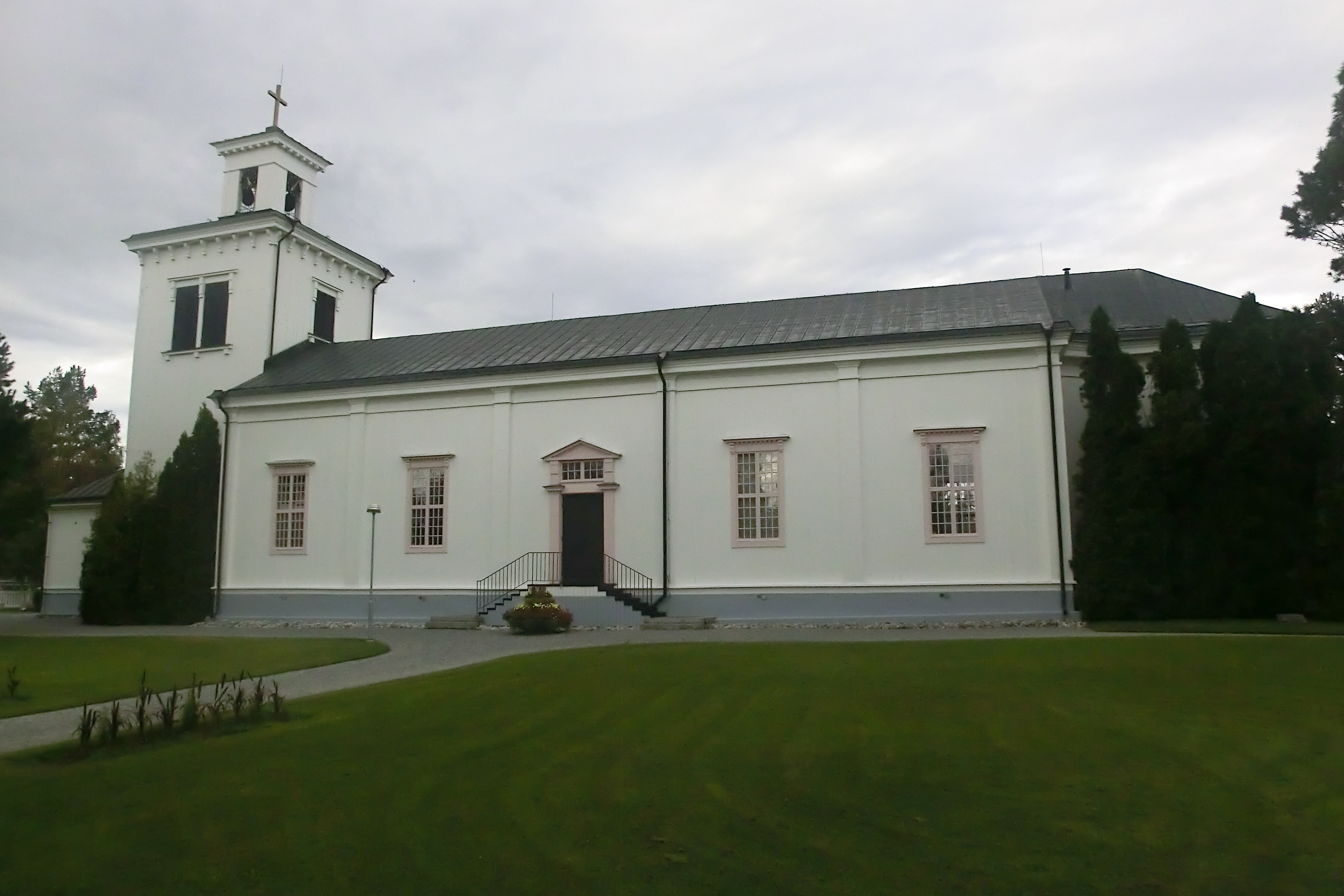

Moliden is a locality situated in Örnsköldsvik Municipality, Västernorrland County, Sweden. It had 300 inhabitants in 2010. Moliden is close to Gottne, Själevad, Bredbyn, and Billsta.
