= Domsjö Fabriker =

Swedish biorefinery located in Örnsköldsvik

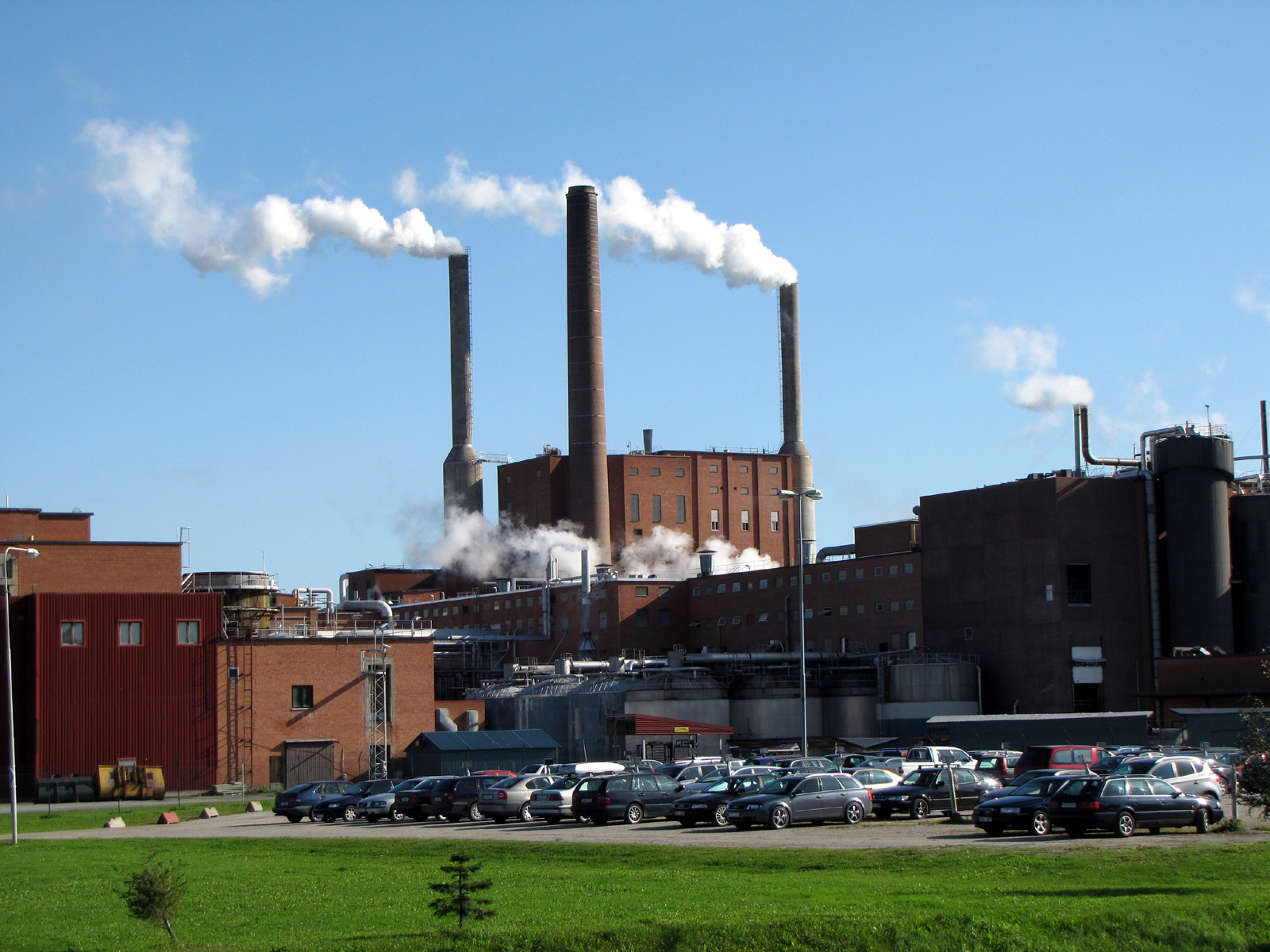
- The Domsjö Fabriker refinery
- Company type: Subsidiary
- Industry: Forestry
- Predecessor: Mo och Domsjo
- Founded: 2000; 25 years ago
- Headquarters: Örnsköldsvik, Sweden
- Parent: Aditya Birla Group
- Website: domsjo.adityabirla.com

Domsjö Fabriker is a Swedish biorefinery located in Örnsköldsvik that converts raw forest materials into specialty cellulose, lignin, and bio-ethanol. In 2000 it was spun off from the forest company Mo och Domsjö AB (MoDo), of which it had been a part since the early 20th century, and sold to a private consortium.

The Domsjö sulphite mill was started in 1903. In 2015, it produced 220,000 metric tons of cellulose. India's Aditya Birla Group acquired the company for US$340 million in 2011.
