= Mollestad Oak =

Oak tree in Southern Norway

Coordinates: 58.31940°N 8.19086°E

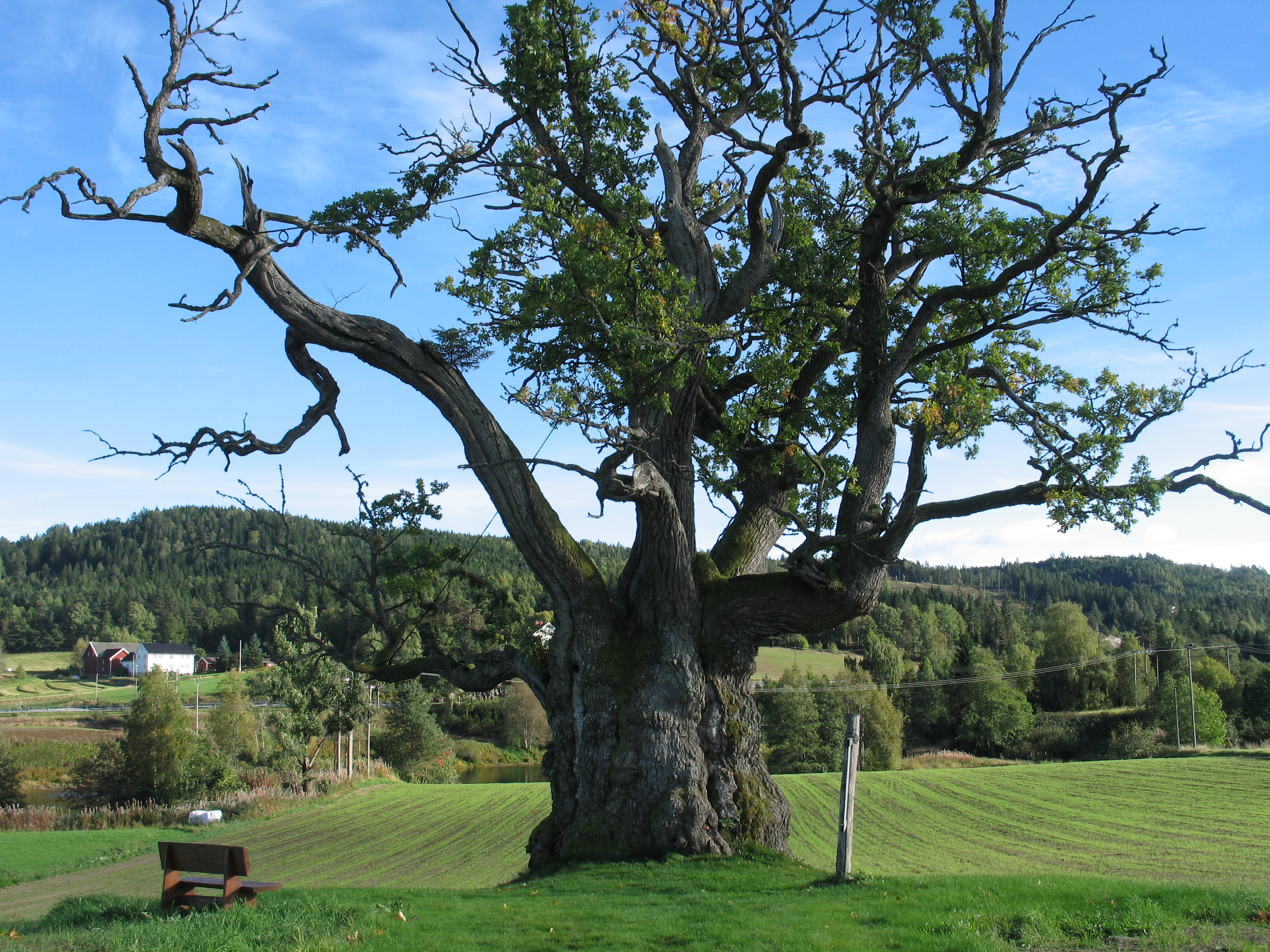
The Mollestad Oak

The Mollestad Oak (Norwegian: Mollestadeika or Vetteika) is a monumental, legendary oak near the Norwegian village of Mollestad in Birkenes Municipality, Norway. The oak has a circumference of 9.21 metres (30.2 ft), measured in 2001, and a height of around 13 metres (43 ft), which makes the Mollestad Oak one of the largest trees in Norway. Its age is estimated at 1000 years. The oak is traditionally a knot oak and the trunk extends to a height of 4 metres (13 ft). The oak is located on a field. In the direction of the oak from the road, there is a grassy strip over which the oak can be reached.

== The legend ==
The nickname Vetteika comes from the vættir. She believed that when the farm builder died, he returned as a guardian spirit. The trees that grew around his burial mound were protected and the surrounding land sacred. It was believed that when these trees were damaged this would bring bad luck. To ensure that everything went well, sacrifices were made to the tree, including the first brewed beer of the year.
