= Lovable (company) =

Swedish vibe coding platform and company

Lovable Labs Incorporated
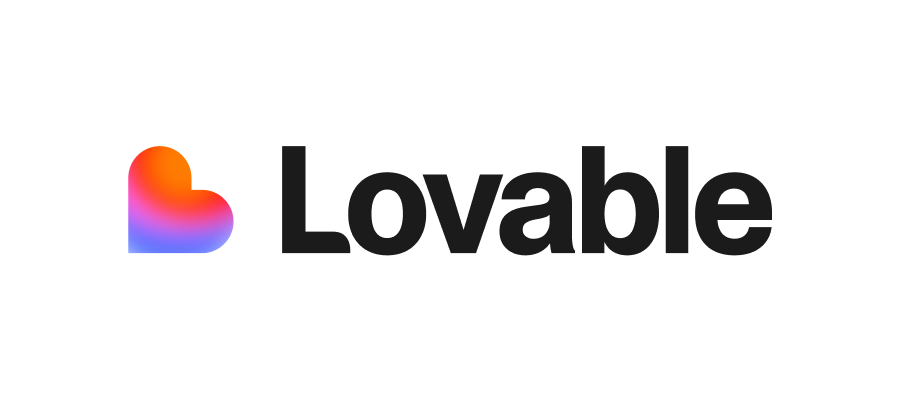
- Logo used From 2025 To Current year
- Type: Private
- Industry: Software
- Founded: 2023; 3 years ago in Stockholm, Sweden
- Founders: Anton Osika; Fabian Hedin
- Headquarters: Stockholm, Sweden
- Key people: Anton Osika (CEO); Fabian Hedin (CTO)
- Number of employees: 120 (2025)
- Website: lovable.dev

Lovable is a Swedish vibe coding platform and company. Founded in Stockholm in 2023, it provides software that allows users to enter prompts to automate software development.

== History ==
In 2023, Anton Osika developed GPT Engineer, open-source software that used large language models to code software applications. Osika and Fabian Hedin then developed GPT Engineer App, a commercialized version of GPT Engineer. In December 2024, Osika and Hedin renamed the app "Lovable" before launching open access.

== Funding ==
In February 2025, Lovable raised a $200 million Series A led by Accel at a $1.8 billion valuation, making it one of the fastest growing technology companies in Europe.

In November 2025, Bloomberg reported that Lovable said it had reached $200 million in annual recurring revenue (ARR), and that it was close to raising new funding that would value the company above $6 billion.

In December 2025, Lovable raised $330 million in a Series B funding round led by CapitalG and Menlo Ventures at a $6.6 billion valuation. Khosla Ventures, Salesforce Ventures, and Databricks Ventures also participated, among other investors.

In August 2026, the company raised a $400 million Series C round, led by Menlo Ventures and the Scaleup Europe Fund, at a valuation of $13.3 billion. At the time the company reported hosting 60 million projects, which cumulatively attracted 900 million monthly visitors.

== Security ==
In March 2025, a Replit employee discovered a security vulnerability in websites created with Lovable. The platform allows websites to connect to the Supabase database platform. Many websites did not correctly configure access controls for their database, which made their contents public. Lovable responded by automatically checking websites for access controls, but this scan did not determine whether the access controls were correct.

== Awards ==
In 2025, Anton Osika and Fabian Hedin received the KTH Innovation Award, an award funded by KTH Royal Institute of Technology, with donations from Mathias Uhlén, professor at KTH, and Spotify founder Daniel Ek.
