= Moälven =

Coordinates: 63.26982°N 18.67801°E

Moälven Själevadsån
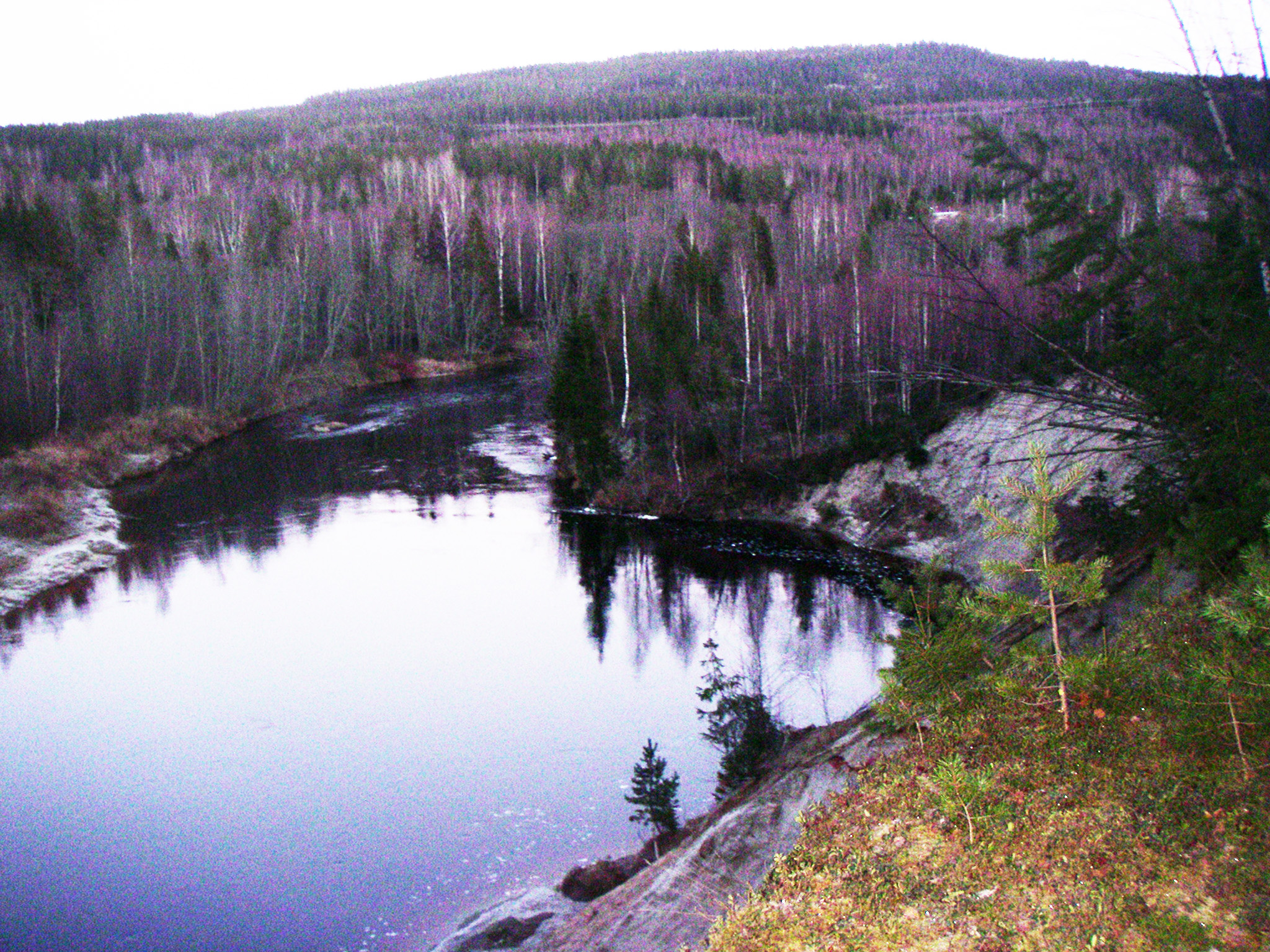
- Moälven at Moliden

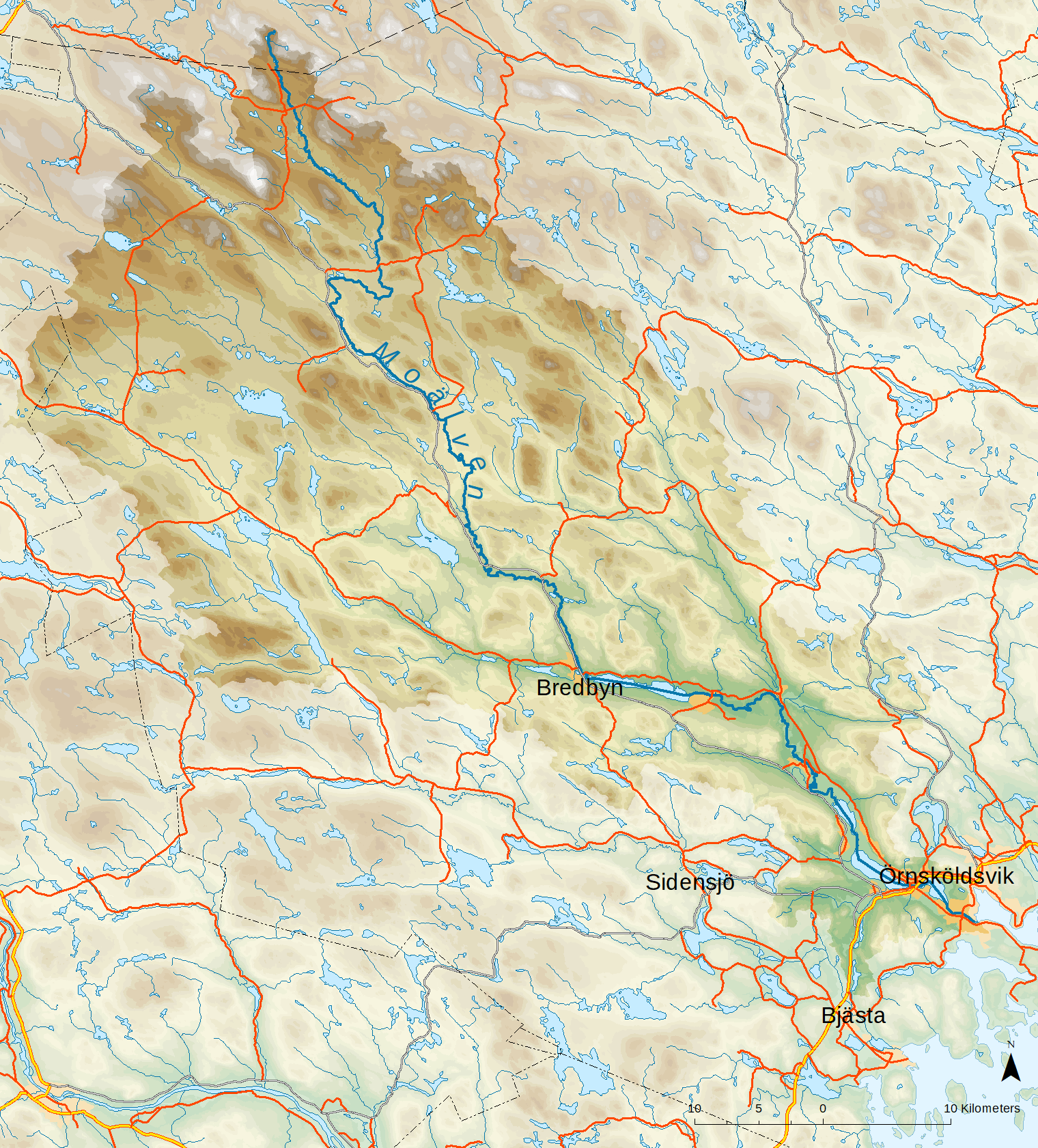
- Map of Moälven and the drainage basin.

Location
- Country: Sweden

Physical characteristics
- Length: 140 km (87 mi)
- Basin size: 2,307.2 km^{2} (890.8 sq mi)

Moälven (or Själevadsån) is a river in Örnsköldsvik Municipality, Västernorrland County, Sweden.

== See also ==
- Moälven (ship)
