= Anton Osika =

Swedish entrepreneur (born 1990)

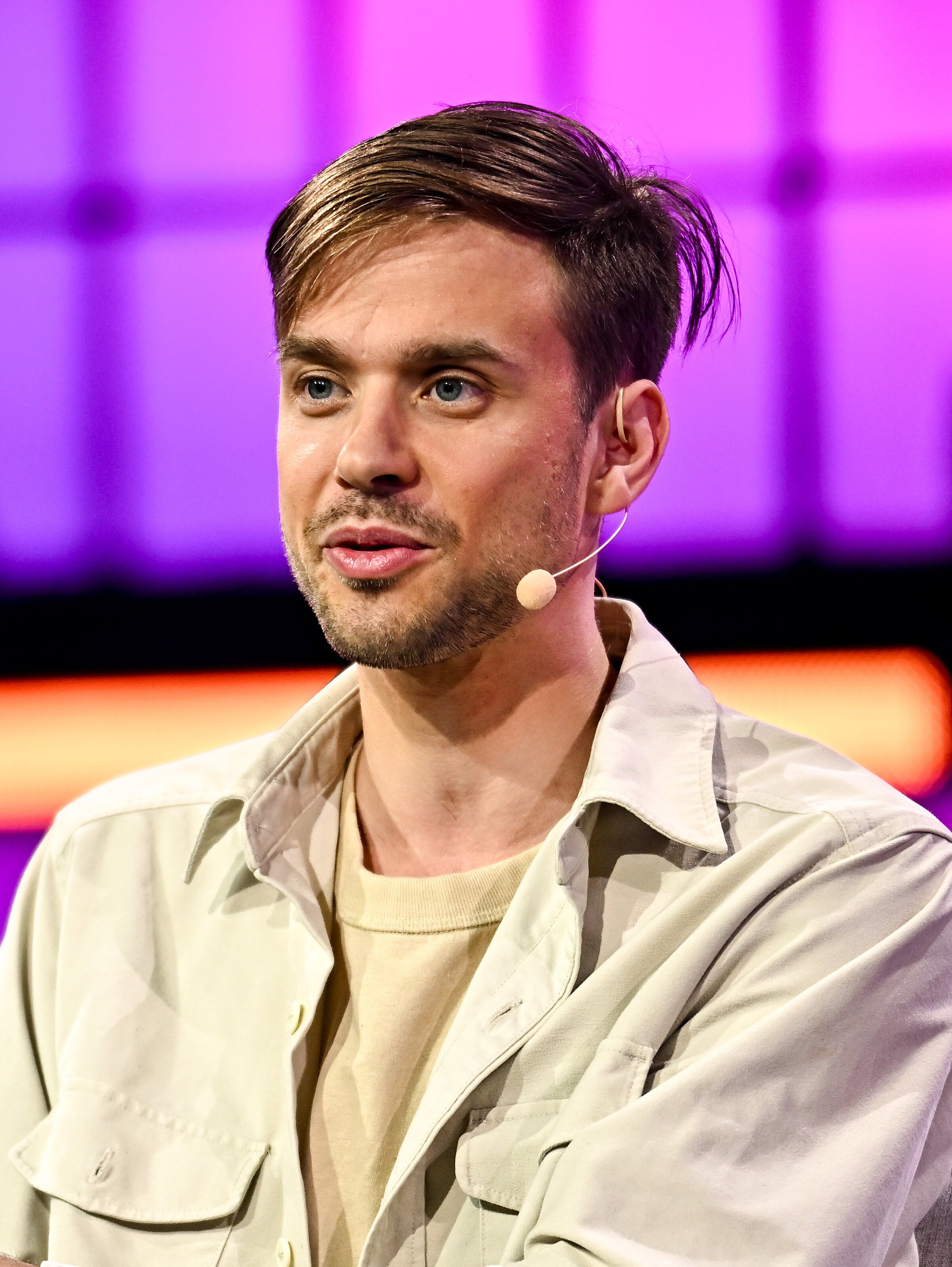
- Osika in 2025
- Born: August 10, 1990 (age 36); Sweden
- Education: KTH Royal Institute of Technology (MSc, Engineering Physics and Applied Mathematics); Hong Kong University of Science and Technology (BSc, Physics)
- Occupations: Software engineer, entrepreneur
- Years active: 2013–present
- Known for: Co-founder and CEO of Lovable; Co-founder of Depict.ai; Co-founder of Sana Labs
- Title: Chief executive officer, Lovable

Anton Osika (born 10 August 1990) is a Swedish software engineer and entrepreneur. He is the co-founder and chief executive officer of Lovable. Osika has also co-founded the companies Depict.ai and Sana Labs, and is known for creating the open-source AI coding project GPT-Engineer.

== Early life and education ==
Osika was born on 10 August 1990 in Sweden. He earned a Bachelor of Science in Physics from the Hong Kong University of Science and Technology, and later completed a Master of Science in Engineering Physics and Applied Mathematics at KTH Royal Institute of Technology in Sweden.

Early in his career he worked in engineering and research roles, including work related to the ATLAS experiment at CERN.

== Career ==
Osika worked as a software engineer and machine-learning researcher before founding startups focused on artificial intelligence and data systems. He was an early engineer at Sana Labs, a company developing AI-based learning and knowledge-management software, and reached a $500 million valuation.

He later co-founded Depict.ai, where he served as chief technology officer, developing machine-learning systems for e-commerce product recommendations.

In 2023, Osika released GPT-Engineer, an open-source tool designed to generate complete software projects from natural-language descriptions using large language models. The project gained significant attention among developers and helped inspire the creation of a commercial product.

Later in 2023, Osika co-founded Lovable with Swedish entrepreneur Fabian Hedin. The company was founded in Stockholm and launched publicly in November 2024.

Lovable develops an AI software-building platform that allows users to generate and modify applications through natural-language instructions. The company reported rapid early growth and reached approximately $100 million in annual recurring revenue within eight months of launch.

Following a funding round for Lovable in December 2025 that valued the company at about $6.6 billion, Osika became a billionaire according to estimates by Forbes.

In 2025, Osika signed the Founders Pledge, committing to donate 50% of his net worth to meaningful causes if Lovable succeeds.

== Awards ==
In September 2025, Osika and Hedin received the KTH Innovation Award from KTH Royal Institute of Technology for their work on Lovable and AI-driven software development.
