= Erik Selin =

Swedish billionaire property developer

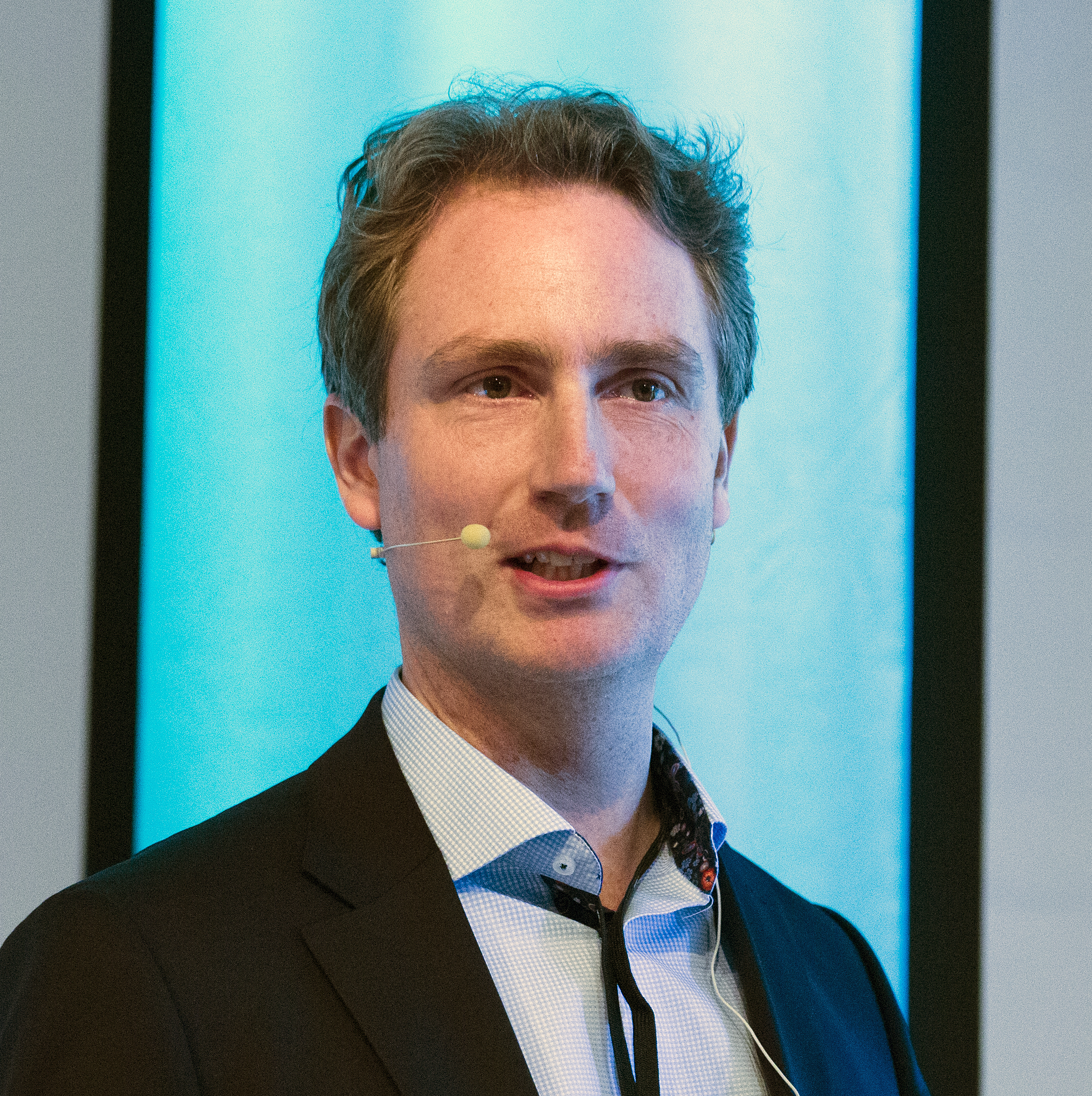
- Selin, 2013
- Born: 1967 (age 58–59)
- Occupation: Property developer
- Spouse: Divorced

Erik Selin (born 1967) is a Swedish billionaire property developer, and the CEO and controlling owner of Fastighets AB Balder.

Selin is the chairman of Collector Credit AB, SATO Oyj, and Collector AB. Selin is divorced and lives in Gothenburg, Sweden.
