= Fredrik Lundberg =

Swedish businessman (born 1951)

- Born: 5 August 1951 (age 75); Norrköping, Sweden
- Citizenship: Sweden
- Education: KTH Royal Institute of Technology
- Occupation: Businessman
- Known for: President/CEO of L E Lundbergföretagen AB
- Spouse: Married
- Children: Katarina Martinson; Louise Lindh
- Parent: Lars Erik Lundberg (father)

Fredrik Lundberg (born 5 August 1951) is a Swedish businessman. His father was Lars Erik Lundberg (1920–2001) founder of L E Lundbergföretagen.

== Career ==
Fredrik Lundberg is president and CEO of L E Lundbergföretagen, of which he inherited a controlling stake from his father. He is the ninth wealthiest person in Sweden, and on number 529 of the richest people in the world according to Forbes magazine 2019.

Fredrik Lundberg enjoys hunting and was a one-time unofficial world junior champion of curling. He is also a supporter of IFK Norrköping and has financially supported their endeavours to return to Allsvenskan.

In June 2011, he received the award Chair of the Year 2011 Årets Ordförande for his work in Cardo AB from Styreinformasjon as in Oslo.

== See also ==
- List of billionaires
- List of Swedes by net worth
