= Billsta =

- Location within Västernorrland Location within Sweden
- Coordinates: 63°20′N 18°30′E
- Country: Sweden
- Province: Ångermanland
- County: Västernorrland County
- Municipality: Örnsköldsvik Municipality

Area
  - Total: 1.07 km^{2} (0.41 sq mi)

Population (31 December 2010)
  - Total: 361
  - Density: 337/km^{2} (870/sq mi)
- Time zone: UTC+1 (CET)
  - Summer (DST): UTC+2 (CEST)

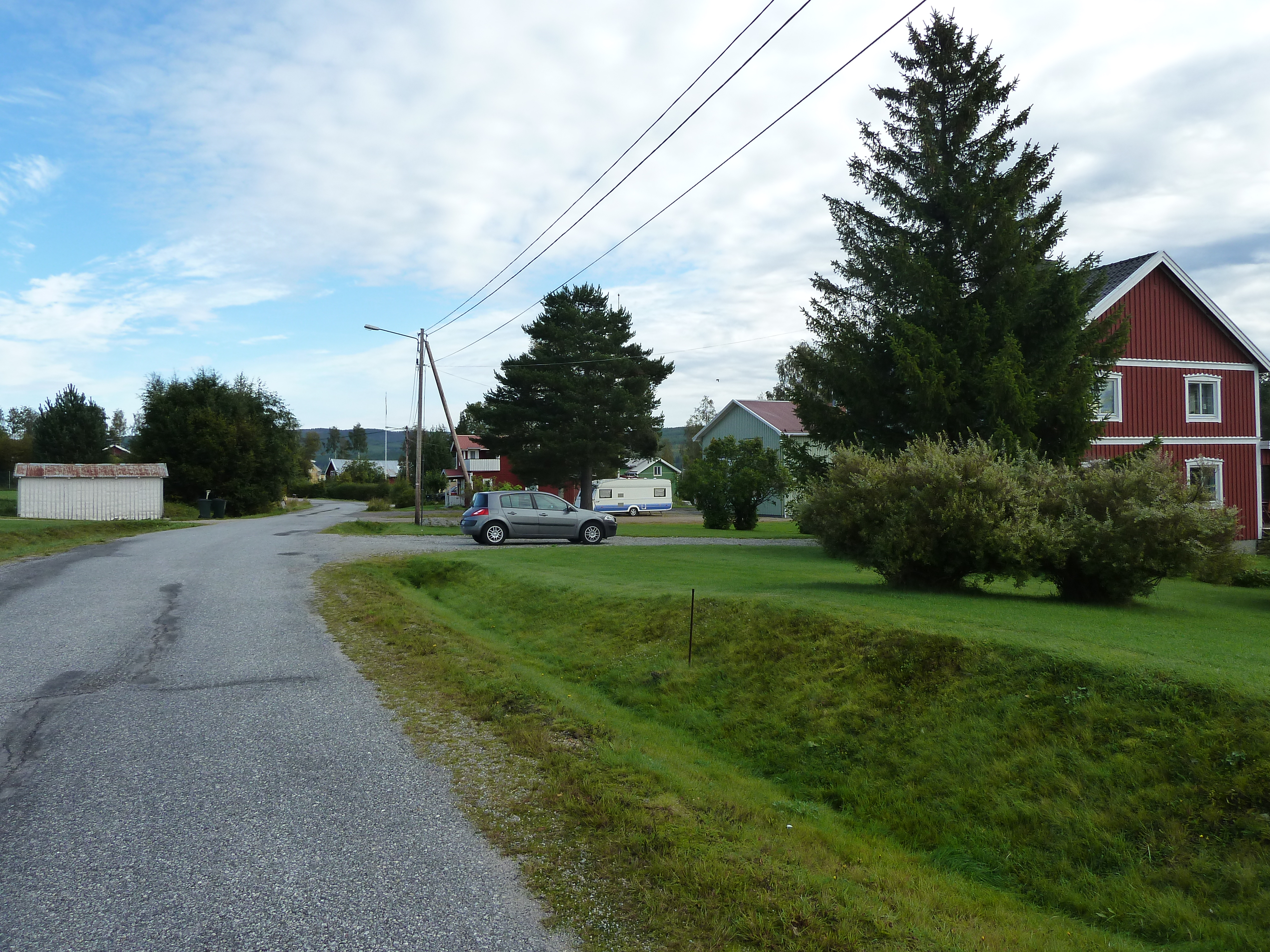

Billsta is a locality situated in Örnsköldsvik Municipality, Västernorrland County, Sweden. It had 361 inhabitants in 2010.
