= L E Lundbergföretagen =

Swedish investment company

L E Lundbergföretagen AB
- Type: Aktiebolag
- Traded as: Nasdaq Stockholm: LUND B
- Industry: Investment
- Founded: 1944; 82 years ago
- Founder: Lars Erik Lundberg
- Headquarters: Stockholm, Sweden,
- Key people: Mats Guldbrand (Chairman of the board), Fredrik Lundberg (President and CEO)
- Website: www.lundbergforetagen.se

L E Lundbergföretagen AB (called Lundbergföretagen or Lundbergs) is an investment company controlled by the Swedish businessman Fredrik Lundberg and family.

== History ==
In 1944, when Lars Erik Lundberg was only 24, he formed the company that was later to become Lundbergs in his apartment in Norrköping. This company engaged in construction operations and focused on residential building.

At an early stage, Lars Erik Lundberg started to show an interest in investing in proprietary properties, having understood the value represented by expansion into an additional business sector, real estate management. This move created greater stability in the company, which could gradually reduce its dependence on construction operations. It is this foundation upon which Fastighets AB L E Lundberg’s property operations rest today.

At the end of the 1970s, Lundbergs began to consider a further expansion of the group’s operations and, during the 1980s, a series of investments were made within new industries. Finance companies were acquired and developed, as were several smaller industrial companies. Investments were also made in certain publicly listed companies. The group’s operations became increasingly diversified and, during the second half of the 1980s, it was decided that investments outside the core area of construction and real estate operations would be concentrated in a limited number of publicly listed companies.

In 1983, shares in Lundbergs, with Lars Erik Lundberg's son Fredrik Lundberg as President and CEO, were listed on the Stockholm Stock Exchange. From its original status as a wholly owned family company, the step was now fully taken into the glare of the public eye. However, the Lundberg family retained a clear majority holding in the Company.

Accordingly, during its first 60 years, Lundbergs has developed from a construction company to an investment company with interests in several areas.

At year-end 2023, L E Lundbergföretagen AB had a net asset value of SEK 135.1 billion ($12.8 billion) and consolidated net sales of SEK 28.7 billion ($2.7 billion). Profit after tax totalled SEK 8.7 million ($821 million).

In 2024, Fredrik Lundberg stepped down as Chairman of the Board and was replaced by Louise Lindh. She was previously CEO of the subsidiary Lundbergs Fastigheter and was replaced by Johan Ladenberg.

== Investments ==
Lundbergs held shares in the following companies as of 22 September 2009:

=== Operating companies ===
- Fastighets AB L E Lundberg – real estate

=== Listed holdings ===
- Hufvudstaden AB – real estate (45.3% stake, 88.1% voting rights)
- Holmen AB – pulp and paper industry (28% stake, 52% voting rights)
- Cardo AB – industrial doors, logistics systems, water treatment systems, process equipment. (41.3% stake, 41.3% voting rights)
- Industrivärden AB – investment company (11.2% stake, 15.5% voting rights)
- Indutrade AB – marketing, components, systems and services (10% stake, 10% voting rights)
- Husqvarna – Auto, chainsaw and sewing machine manufacturer (7,5 % stake, 24,9 % voting rights)
- Handelsbanken – banking (1.8% stake, 1.8% voting rights)
- Sandvik – high-technology engineering group, tooling, materials technology, mining and construction (1.2% stake, 1.2% voting rights)

== See also ==
=== Other Swedish investment companies ===
- Ratos
- Investment AB Kinnevik
- Investment AB Latour
- Investor AB
- Industrivärden
