= Tveide =

Village in Birkenes Municipality, Norway

- Village
- Interactive map of Tveide
- Coordinates: 58.3024°N 08.2295°E
- Country: Norway
- Region: Southern Norway
- County: Agder
- Municipality: Birkenes Municipality
- Elevation: 71 m (233 ft)
- Time zone: UTC+01:00 (CET)
  - Summer (DST): UTC+02:00 (CEST)
- Post Code: 4760 Birkeland

Tveide is a village in Birkenes Municipality in Agder county, Norway. The village is located about 3 kilometres (1.9 mi) south of the municipal centre of Birkeland. Historically, there was a railway station here along the now-closed Lillesand-Flaksvand Line.
