= Svaland =

Village in Birkenes Municipality, Norway

- Village
- Interactive map of Svaland
- Coordinates: 58.3138°N 08.1122°E
- Country: Norway
- Region: Southern Norway
- County: Agder
- Municipality: Birkenes Municipality
- Elevation: 318 m (1,043 ft)
- Time zone: UTC+01:00 (CET)
  - Summer (DST): UTC+02:00 (CEST)
- Post Code: 4760 Birkeland

Svaland is a village in Birkenes Municipality in Agder county, Norway. The village is located in a very rural area about 10 kilometres (6.2 mi) southwest of the village of Birkeland and about the same distance northeast of the village of Vennesla.
