= Søndeled =

Søndeled may refer to:

== Places ==
- Søndeled (village), a village in Risør Municipality in Agder county, Norway
- Søndeled Municipality, a former municipality in the old Aust-Agder county, Norway
- Søndeled Church, a church in Risør Municipality in Agder county, Norway
