= Søndeled Municipality =

Former municipality in Aust-Agder, Norway

Søndeled Municipality Søndeled herred
- Former municipality
- Østerrisør landdistrikt (historic name)
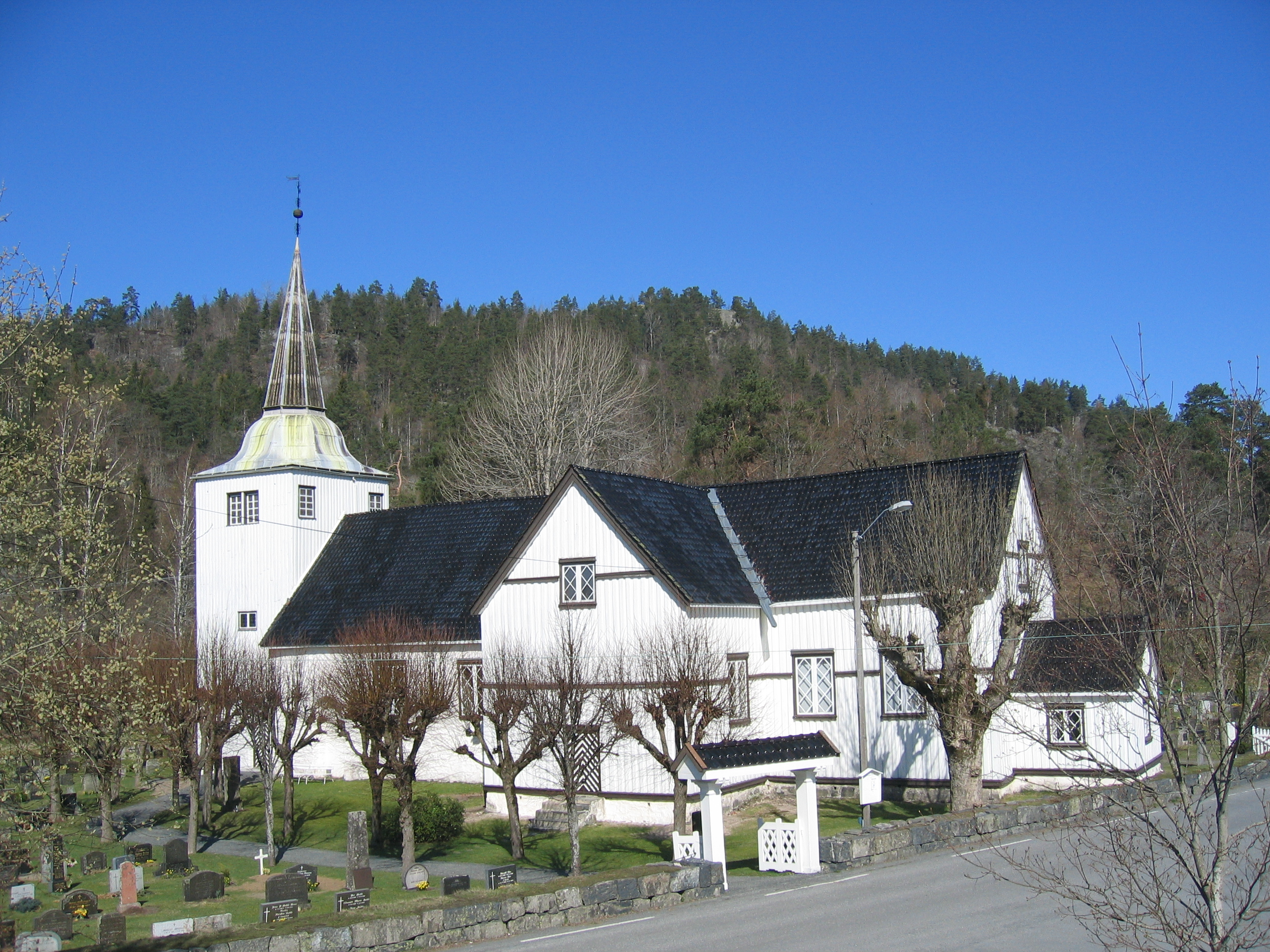
- View of the Søndeled Church

- Aust-Agder within Norway

- Søndeled within Aust-Agder
- Coordinates: 58°45′38″N 09°04′30″E
- Country: Norway
- County: Aust-Agder
- District: Østre Agder
- Established: 1 Jan 1838
  - Created as: Formannskapsdistrikt
- Disestablished: 1 Jan 1964
  - Succeeded by: Risør Municipality
- Administrative centre: Søndeled

Government
  - Mayor (1956–1963): Jakob Vik

Area
  - Total: 188.5 km^{2} (72.8 sq mi)
  - Rank: #383 in Norway
- Highest elevation: 244.26 m (801.4 ft)

Population (1963)
  - Total: 3,152
  - Rank: #288 in Norway
  - Density: 16.7/km^{2} (43/sq mi)
  - Change (10 years): ▲ +1.1%
- Demonym: Sønndøling

Official language
  - Norwegian form: Neutral
- Time zone: UTC+01:00 (CET)
  - Summer (DST): UTC+02:00 (CEST)
- ISO 3166 code: NO-0913

Søndeled is a former municipality in the old Aust-Agder county, Norway. The 188.5-square-kilometre (72.8 sq mi) municipality existed from 1838 until its dissolution in 1964. The area is now part of Risør Municipality in the traditional district of Østre Agder in Agder county. The administrative centre was the village of Søndeled at the innermost part of the Søndeledfjorden. Other villages in Søndeled included Stamsøy, Akland, Moen, Bossvika, and Sivik.

Prior to its dissolution in 1964, the 188.5-square-kilometre (72.8 sq mi) municipality was the 383rd largest by area out of the 689 municipalities in Norway. Søndeled Municipality was the 288th most populous municipality in Norway with a population of about 3,152. The municipality's population density was 16.7 inhabitants per square kilometre (43/sq mi) and its population had increased by 1.1% over the previous 10-year period.

== General information ==
=== Administrative history ===
The parish of "Østerrisør landdistrikt" was established as a municipality on 1 January 1838 (see formannskapsdistrikt law). It was called Østerrisør (lit. 'East Risør') to distinguish itself from Vesterrisør (lit. 'West Risør'). It was called a "landdistrikt" because it was the rural district surrounding the neighboring town of Østerrisør. In 1865, the name was changed to Søndeled Municipality.

On 1 January 1867, an uninhabited part of Søndeled Municipality was transferred to the neighboring Dybvaag Municipality. Later, on 1 January 1901, a small urban area of eastern Søndeled Municipality (population: 658) was transferred to the neighboring town of Risør.

During the 1960s, there were many municipal mergers across Norway due to the work of the Schei Committee. On 1 January 1964, Søndeled Municipality (population: 3,134) was dissolved and merged with Risør Municipality (population: 3,002) to form an enlarged Risør Municipality.

=== Name ===
The municipality (originally the parish) is named after the local Søndeledfjorden (Old Norse: Sundaleið) since the first Søndeled Church was built there. The first element is the plural genitive case of the word sund which means "sound" or "strait". The last element is the plural form of leið which means "way" or "path". Thus, the name means something like the "paths between the straits".

=== Churches ===
The Church of Norway had two parishes (sokn) within Søndeled Municipality. At the time of the municipal dissolution, it was part of the Søndeled prestegjeld and the Aust-Nedenes prosti (deanery) in the Diocese of Agder.

Churches in Søndeled Municipality
Parish (sokn)	Church name	Location of the church	Year built
Indre Søndeled	Indre Søndeled Church	Søndeled	c. 1150
Ytre Søndeled	Ytre Søndeled Church	Frydendal (just outside the town of Risør)	1878

== Geography ==
The municipality encompassed the land around the Søndeledfjorden. The highest point in the municipality was the 244.26-metre (801.4 ft) tall mountain Espehaugen, located near the border with Vegårshei Municipality. Sannidal Municipality (in Telemark county) was located to the north, Skåtøy Municipality (in Telemark county) was located to the northeast, the Skagerrak was located to the east, Risør Municipality was an enclave located in the eastern part of Søndeled Municipality, Tvedestrand Municipality was located to the south, Vegårshei Municipality was located to the west, and Gjerstad Municipality was located to the northwest.

== Government ==
While it existed, Søndeled Municipality was responsible for primary education (through 10th grade), outpatient health services, senior citizen services, welfare and other social services, zoning, economic development, and municipal roads and utilities. The municipality was governed by a municipal council of directly elected representatives. The mayor was indirectly elected by a vote of the municipal council. The municipality was under the jurisdiction of the Holt District Court and the Agder Court of Appeal.

=== Municipal council ===
The municipal council (Herredsstyre) of Søndeled Municipality was made up of 25 representatives that were elected to four year terms. The tables below show the historical composition of the council by political party.

Søndeled herredsstyre 1959–1963
Party name (in Norwegian)	Number of representatives
Labour Party (Arbeiderpartiet)	8
Christian Democratic Party (Kristelig Folkeparti)	5
Liberal Party (Venstre)	8
Joint List(s) of Non-Socialist Parties (Borgerlige Felleslister)	4
Total number of members:	25
Note: On 1 January 1964, Søndeled Municipality became part of Risør Municipality.

Søndeled herredsstyre 1955–1959
Party name (in Norwegian)	Number of representatives
Labour Party (Arbeiderpartiet)	8
Christian Democratic Party (Kristelig Folkeparti)	5
Liberal Party (Venstre)	8
Joint List(s) of Non-Socialist Parties (Borgerlige Felleslister)	4
Total number of members:	25

Søndeled herredsstyre 1951–1955
Party name (in Norwegian)	Number of representatives
Labour Party (Arbeiderpartiet)	8
Christian Democratic Party (Kristelig Folkeparti)	4
Liberal Party (Venstre)	9
Joint List(s) of Non-Socialist Parties (Borgerlige Felleslister)	3
Total number of members:	24

Søndeled herredsstyre 1947–1951
Party name (in Norwegian)	Number of representatives
Labour Party (Arbeiderpartiet)	6
Christian Democratic Party (Kristelig Folkeparti)	7
Joint list of the Liberal Party (Venstre) and the Radical People's Party (Radikale Folkepartiet)	11
Total number of members:	24

Søndeled herredsstyre 1945–1947
Party name (in Norwegian)	Number of representatives
Labour Party (Arbeiderpartiet)	9
Christian Democratic Party (Kristelig Folkeparti)	6
Joint list of the Liberal Party (Venstre) and the Radical People's Party (Radikale Folkepartiet)	7
Local List(s) (Lokale lister)	2
Total number of members:	24

Søndeled herredsstyre 1937–1941*
Party name (in Norwegian)	Number of representatives
Labour Party (Arbeiderpartiet)	7
Liberal Party (Venstre)	12
List of workers, fishermen, and small farmholders (Arbeidere, fiskere, småbrukere liste)	1
Joint List(s) of Non-Socialist Parties (Borgerlige Felleslister)	4
Total number of members:	24
Note: Due to the German occupation of Norway during World War II, no elections were held for new municipal councils until after the war ended in 1945.

=== Mayors ===
The mayor (Norwegian: ordfører) of Søndeled Municipality was the political leader of the municipality and the chairperson of the municipal council. The following people have held this position:

- 1838–1839: Hovor Halvorsen Akland
- 1840–1841: Halvor Olsen Stamsø
- 1842–1845: Hovor Halvorsen Akland
- 1846–1849: Halvor Mogensen Akland
- 1850–1853: Hovor Halvorsen Akland
- 1854–1855: Halvor Mogensen Akland
- 1856–1859: Halvor Olsen Stamsø
- 1859–1879: Ole Torjesen Lindstøl
- 1880–1881: Anders Hovorsen Moland
- 1882–1883: Gregers Tengelsen Øia
- 1884–1885: Ole Eriksen Skjelsø
- 1886–1891: Halvor Halvorsen Stamsø
- 1892–1895: Peder Tjøstelsen Aas
- 1896–1900: Tallak Lindstøl
- 1901–1902: Hovor Andersen Moland
- 1902–1904: Peder Tjøstelsen Aas
- 1905–1910: Hovor Andersen Moland
- 1911–1914: Halvor Gundersen Homme
- 1914–1916: Ole Johnsen Egeland
- 1917–1919: Lars Løkketangen
- 1920–1922: Halvor Gundersen Homme
- 1923–1928: Lars Løkketangen
- 1929–1931: Guttorm Moland
- 1932–1934: Anders Dørsdal
- 1935–1940: Anders Sletten
- 1941–1942: Ingvald Urfjell
- 1943–1944: Tjøstel Skjeldsø
- 1945–1945: Ingvald Urfjell
- 1945–1945: Anders Sletten
- 1946–1955: Ola Røysland
- 1956–1963: Jakob Vik

== See also ==
- List of former municipalities of Norway
