= Risør Municipality =

Municipality in Agder, Norway

Risør Municipality Risør kommune
- Municipality
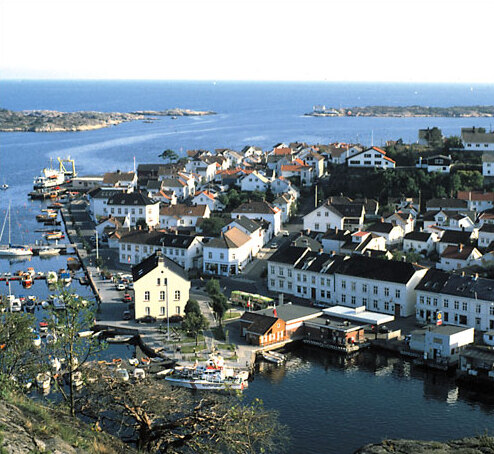
- View of the town of Risør

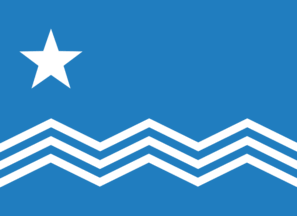
- Flag Coat of arms

- Agder within Norway

- Risør within Agder
- Coordinates: 58°43′35″N 09°11′40″E
- Country: Norway
- County: Agder
- District: Østre Agder
- Established: 1 Jan 1838
  - Created as: Formannskapsdistrikt
- Administrative centre: Risør

Government
  - Mayor (2023): Kai Strat (H)

Area
  - Total: 183.66 km^{2} (70.91 sq mi)
  - Land: 170.69 km^{2} (65.90 sq mi)
  - Water: 12.97 km^{2} (5.01 sq mi) 7.1%
  - Rank: #309 in Norway
- Highest elevation: 244.26 m (801.4 ft)

Population (2026)
  - Total: 6,683
  - Rank: #149 in Norway
  - Density: 39.2/km^{2} (102/sq mi)
  - Change (10 years): ▼ −3.4%
- Demonym: Risøring

Official language
  - Norwegian form: Neutral
- Time zone: UTC+01:00 (CET)
  - Summer (DST): UTC+02:00 (CEST)
- ISO 3166 code: NO-4201
- Website: Official website

Risør (pronounced [rɪːˌsøːr]) is a municipality in Agder county, Norway. It is located on the Skagerrak coast in the traditional region of Sørlandet. The administrative centre of Risør municipality is the town of Risør. There are many villages in Risør such as Akland, Bossvika, Fie, Hødnebø, Krabbesund, Moen, Nipe, Røysland, Sandnes, Sivik, Søndeled, and Stamsøy.

The 183.66-square-kilometre (70.91 sq mi) municipality is the 309th largest by area out of the 357 municipalities in Norway. Risør Municipality is the 149th most populous municipality in Norway with a population of 6,683. The municipality's population density is 39.2 inhabitants per square kilometre (102/sq mi) and its population has decreased by 3.4% over the previous 10-year period.

Risør Municipality is a tourist destination, and the surrounding area includes many small lakes and hills. Together with its coastline, the municipality is known for its tourist attractions such as the wooden boat festival which is staged during the first week of August every year. It also has a growing reputation as the regional capital of arts and crafts, which culminates in the "Villvin-festival" during the summer holiday.

== General information ==
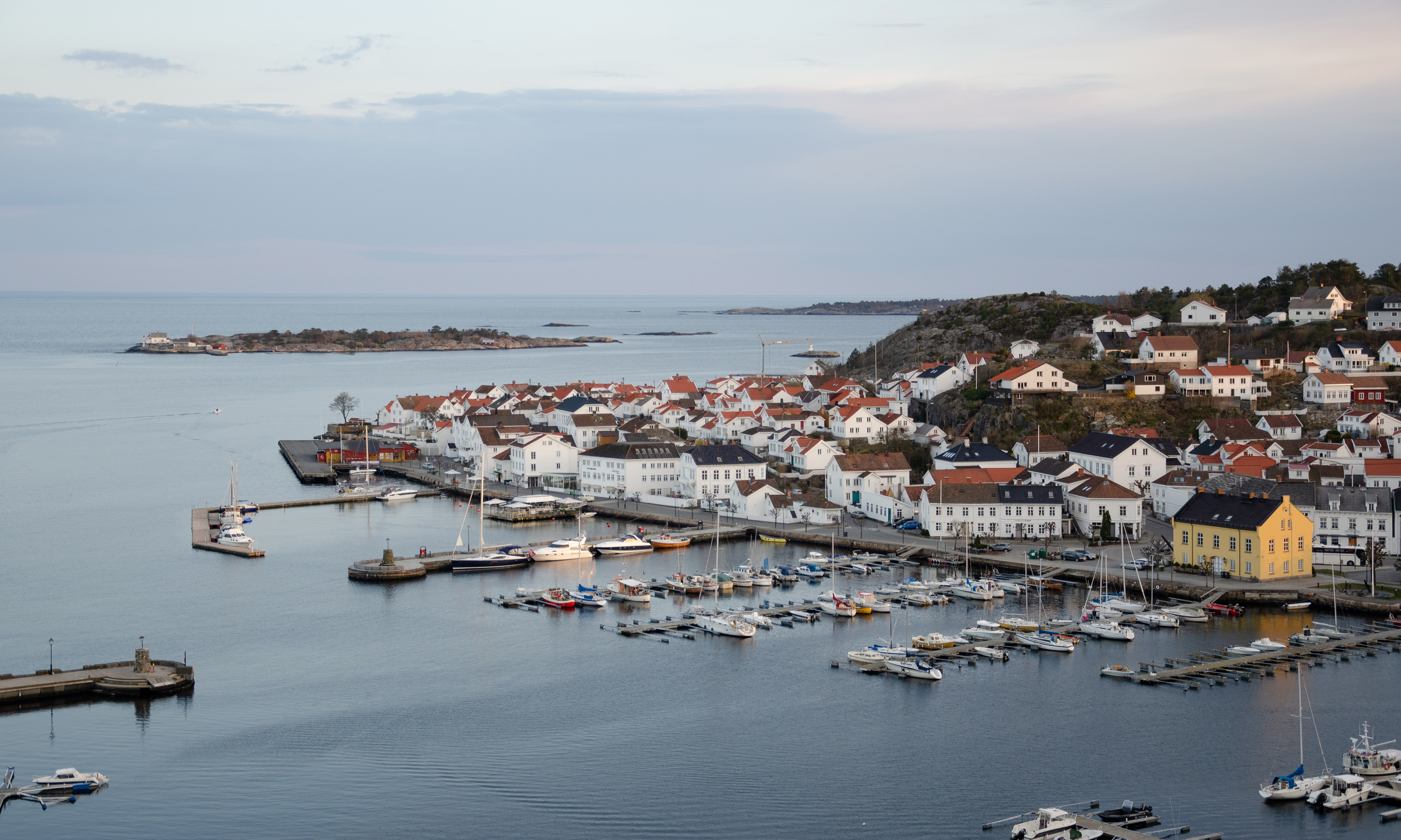
View of the outer harbour

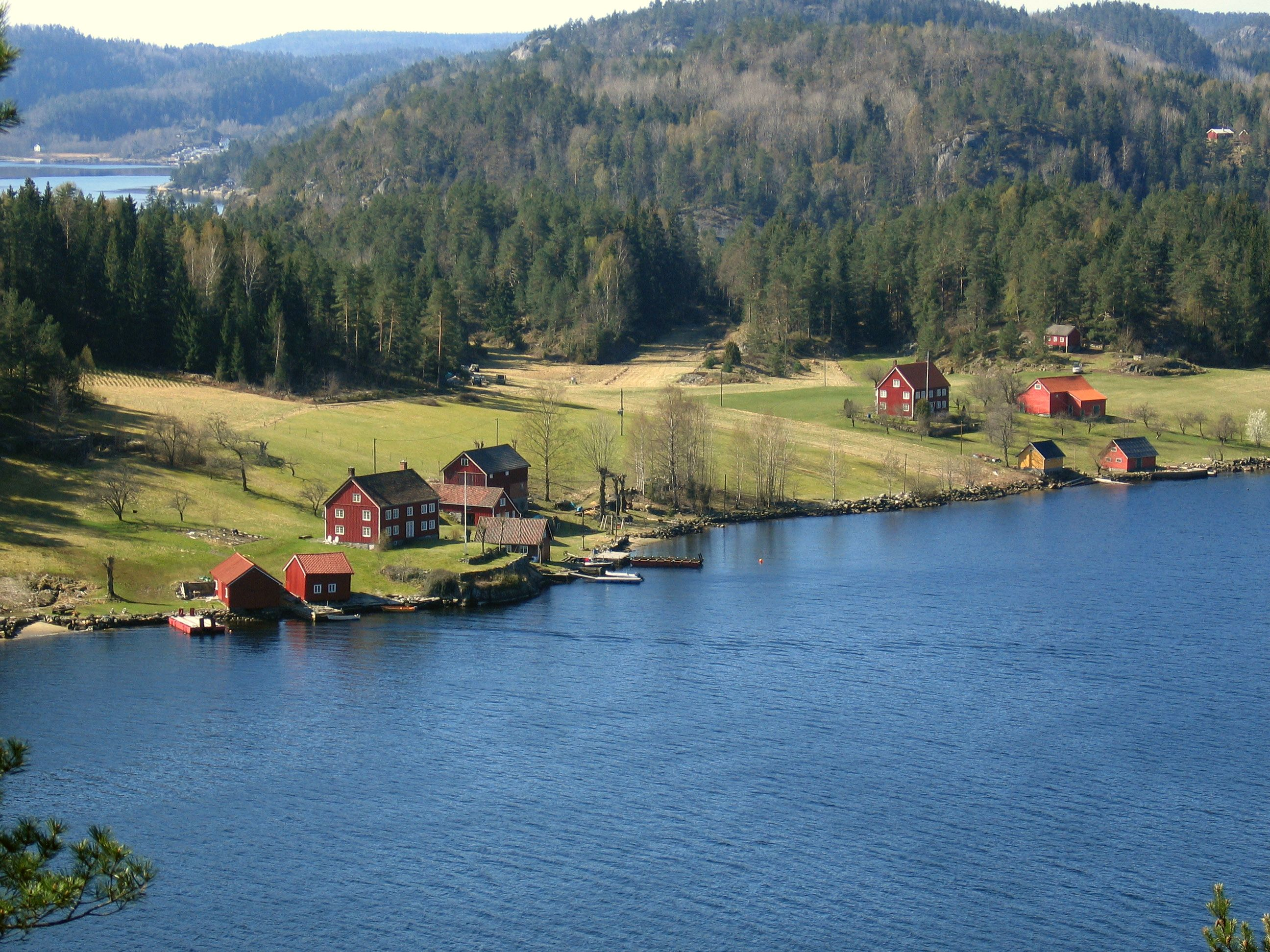
A farm along the Søndeledfjorden

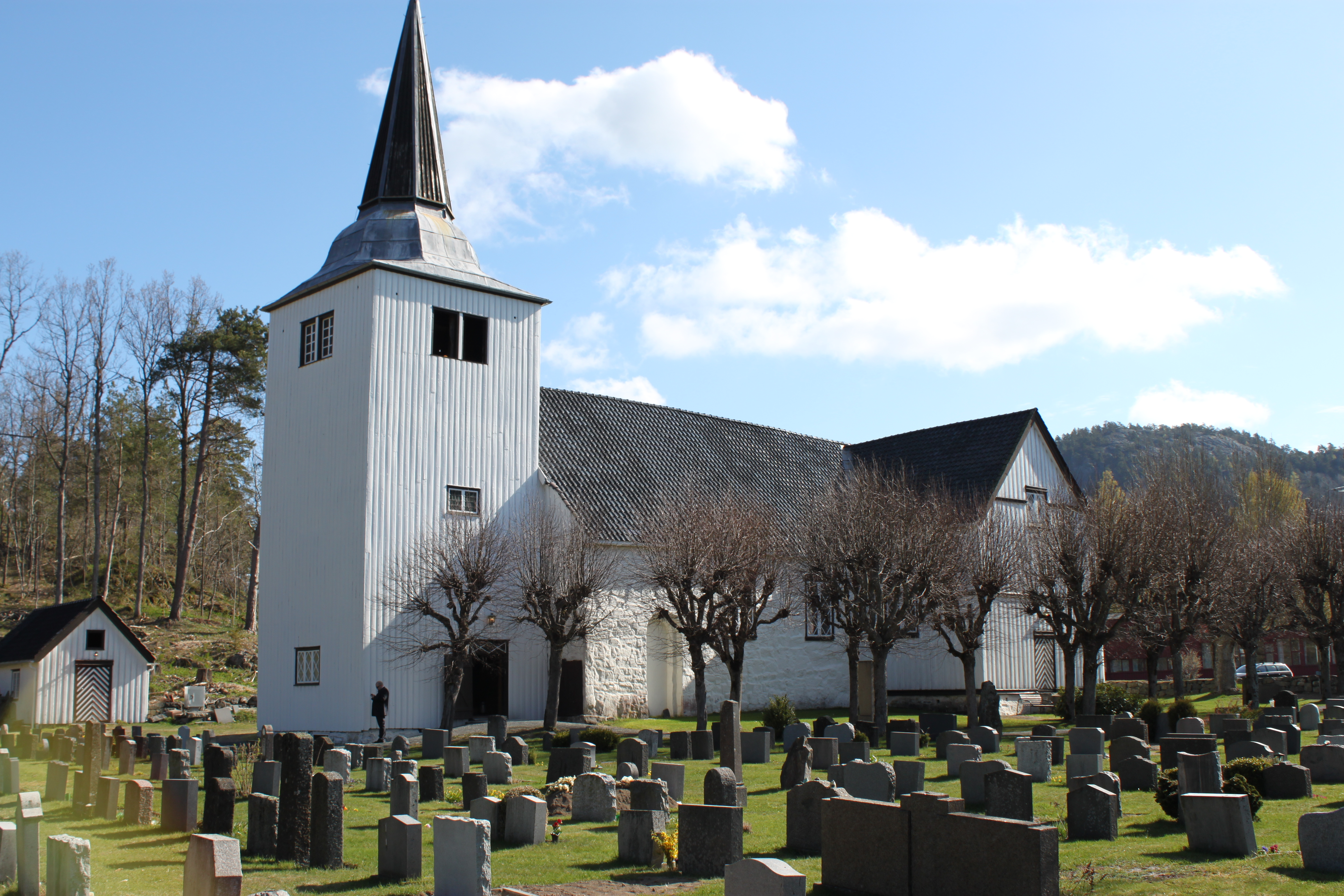
Søndeled Church, built c. 1150

=== Administrative history ===
The kjøpstad of Risør was established as a municipality on 1 January 1838 (see formannskapsdistrikt law). On 1 January 1901, a small part of the neighboring Søndeled Municipality (population: 658) was transferred into Risør Municipality.

During the 1960s, there were many municipal mergers across Norway due to the work of the Schei Committee. On 1 January 1964, Søndeled Municipality (population: 3,134) was dissolved and merged with Risør Municipality (population: 3,002) to form an enlarged Risør Municipality. On 1 January 1984, the uninhabited Folevatnet area of neighboring Tvedestrand Municipality was transferred to Risør Municipality.

In 2020, there were many municipal and county mergers across Norway due to the work of the Solberg cabinet. Historically, this municipality was part of the old Aust-Agder county. On 1 January 2020, the municipality became a part of the newly-formed Agder county (after Aust-Agder and Vest-Agder counties were merged).

On 1 January 2025, the 9.5-square-kilometre (3.7 sq mi) Røysland area (population: 100) was transferred from Risør Municipality to the neighboring Tvedestrand Municipality.

=== Name ===
The town and municipality is named after the small island of Risøya which is located on the sea, just off the coast of the town. The name likely comes from the Old Norse name Ríseyjar. The first element is rís which means "thicket" or "brush". The last element is eyjar which means "islands". The relatively more modern Danish language version of eyjar is øer, hence the current spelling of "Risør". The old name of the town (prior to 1909) was Øster Riisöer or Østerrisør (with øster meaning "eastern" Risør). After 1909, it was simply called Risør. The prefix was added in the 16th century to distinguish this town from the town of Vesterrisør, the old name of the nearby town of Mandal. After Vesterrisør was renamed Mandal, the prefix was dropped as it was no longer needed.

=== Coat of arms ===
The coat of arms was granted on 18 July 1891. The blazon is "Azure, per fess a rocky island sable with lighthouse and two stars argent over barry wavy azure and argent". This means the arms have a blue field (background) and the charge is a black rocky island coming out of blue waves with a lighthouse on the island and two stars in the sky. The charge has a tincture of argent which means it is commonly colored white, but if it is made out of metal, then silver is used. The arms often have a mural crown over the shield. The lighthouse was chosen to symbolize the Holmen fortress built in 1788. The history of these arms is quite curious. It is said that on 18 July 1891 King Oscar II visited the town of Risør so a menu had to be printed. It was printed with a coat of arms on the top, which was probably designed by the printer. That afternoon the King approved the new arms, mainly because his name was printed under the arms on the menu.

The municipal flag does not has the same design as the coat of arms. The blue flag has one white star in the top left corner and three jagged horizontal white stripes.

=== Churches ===
The Church of Norway has two parishes (sokn) within Risør Municipality. It is part of the Aust-Nedenes prosti (deanery) in the Diocese of Agder og Telemark.

Churches in Risør Municipality
Parish (sokn)	Church name	Location of the church	Year built
Risør	Frydendal Church	Risør	1879
Risør	Risør Church	Risør	1647
Søndeled	Søndeled Church	Søndeled	c. 1150

== History ==
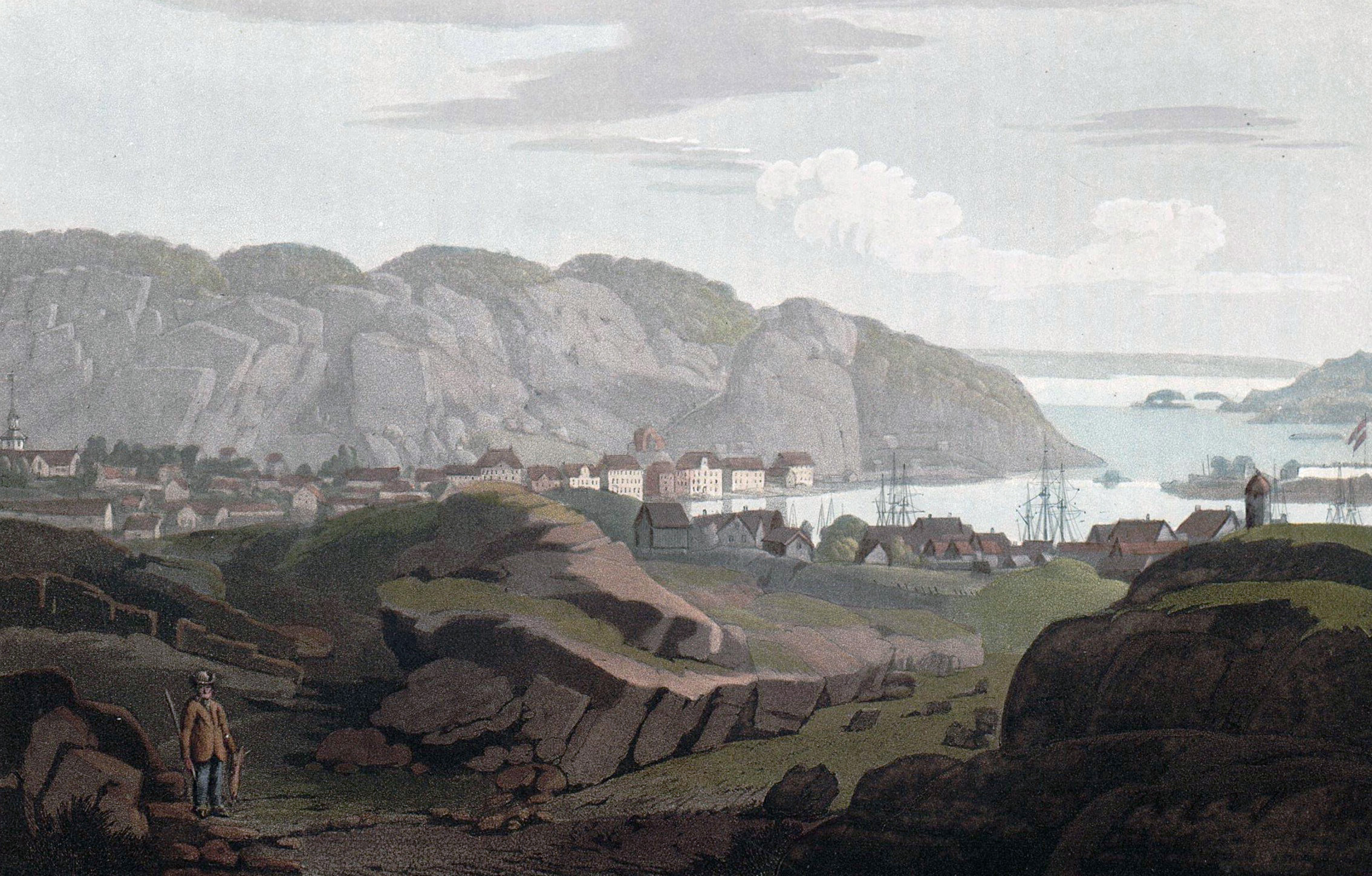
Painting of the town c. 1800

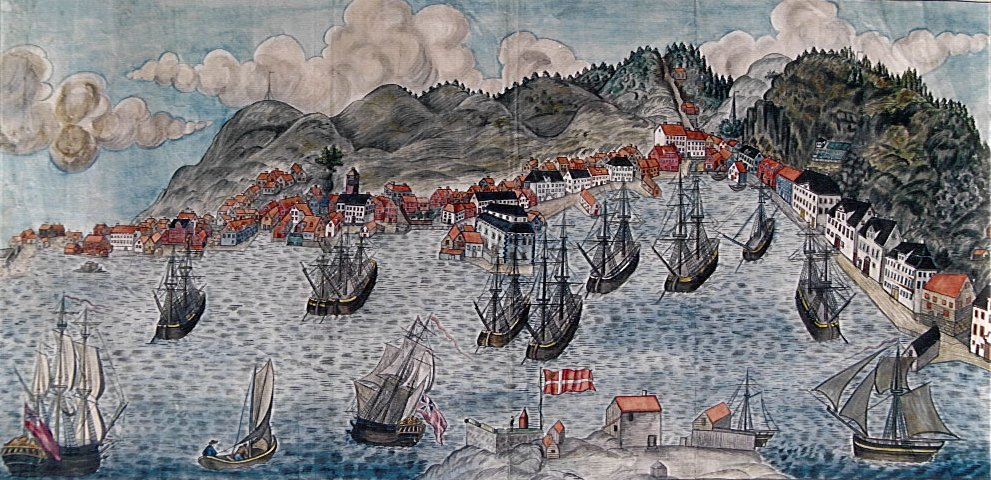
Painting of the battery at Holmen

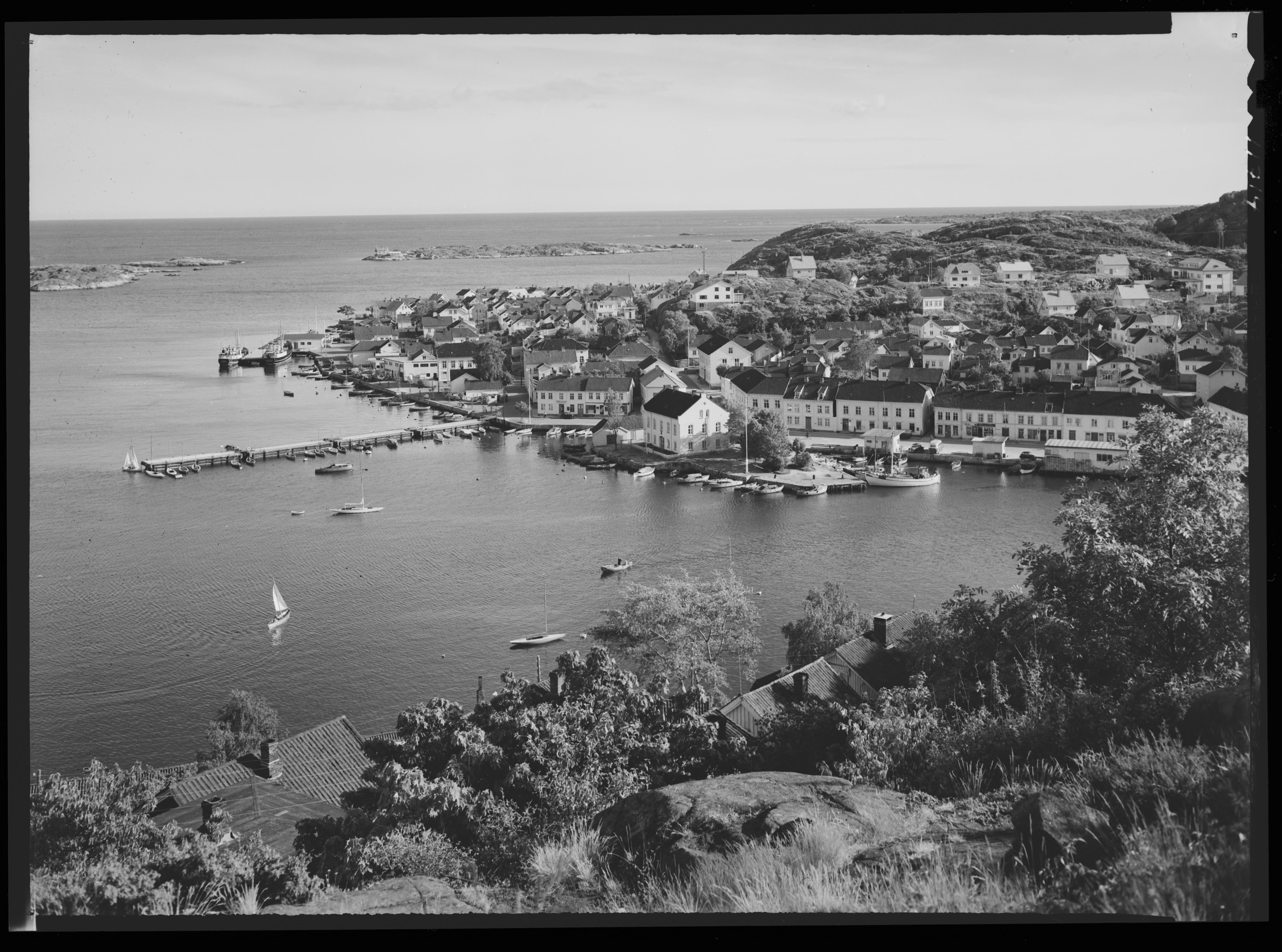
Picture of the harbour c. 1950

The village of Risør was a small fishing village in the prestegjeld of Søndeled when Dutch vessels began to call there to purchase timber around the year 1570. By 1607, two inns had been opened to serve Dutch sailors. In 1630, Risør became a privileged port (ladested). The town has a timber church, Risør Church which was built in the Baroque style in 1647.

In 1723, Risør was granted town status kjøpstad as a which granted it a number of commercial privileges. By the end of the 18th century, 96 sailing vessels were owned by Risør merchants. It was the sixth largest shipping town and one of four shipbuilding centers in Norway.

In Letters on Sweden, Norway, and Denmark, Mary Wollstonecraft wrote extensively while visiting Risør in 1783, including the following remarks:

- On entering Risør: "We were a considerable time entering amongst the islands, before we saw about two hundred houses crowded together under a very high rock—still higher appearing above."
- While at Risør: "...seaports are not favorable to improvement. The captains acquire a little superficial knowledge by traveling, which their indefatigable attention to the making of money prevents their digesting; and the fortune that they thus laboriously acquire is spent, as it usually is in towns of this description, in show and good living."
- While departing Risør: "The view of the town was now extremely fine. A huge rocky mountain stood up behind it, and a vast cliff stretched on each side, forming a semicircle. In a recess of the rocks was a clump of pines, amongst which a steeple rose picturesquely beautiful."

Risør played a role in the Napoleonic Wars in 1807–1814, when Denmark–Norway took France's side, and therefore became the enemy of Norway's most important trading-partner: Great Britain. (It is from this period that Henrik Ibsen took his subject, when he created his famous poem Terje Vigen.) It was south of Risør, in Lyngør (now in the neighboring Tvedestrand Municipality) that several British warships, headed by HMS Dictator of the English navy pursued and sank the last major vessel and the pride of Norway: the frigate HDMS Najaden.

On 1 January 1838, the new formannskapsdistrikt law came into effect, granting each parish and town in Norway the rights to have a self-governing council. Thus, Risør was a small town with a council to run it.

Risør was almost wiped off the map in 1861. A great fire swept across the small town leaving just 85 houses and the 1647 Risør Church. The entire road network was re-worked after the fire to remove the small streets and alleys and have wider roads that are there today. The city was redesigned and rebuilt and today it presents a positive impression of a well kept town with white, wooden houses. White was chosen because it was an expensive paint and the residents wanted to give an expression of prosperity. Still today, most houses have white paint, although some have other colors on the sides and back of their houses.

By the second half of the 19th century, over 100 sailing vessels were based at their home port in Risør and more than 1,000 sailors called Risør home. The transition to steamships and the economic damage of World War I, however, destroyed Risør's shipping industry.

On 1 January 1901, an area of the neighboring Søndeled Municipality (population: 658) was transferred to the city, greatly expanding Risør. During the 1960s, there were many municipal mergers across Norway due to the work of the Schei Committee. On 1 January 1964, the town of Risør (population: 3,002) and the entire municipality of Søndeled (population: 3,134) were merged to form a new, much larger municipality of Risør, with the town being the administrative centre.

== Geography ==
Risør is the easternmost coastal municipality in Agder county, located on the peninsula between the mouths of the Søndeledfjorden and Sandnesfjorden, providing ready access to the Skagerrak. The highest point in the municipality is the 244.26-metre (801.4 ft) tall mountain Espehaugen in the western part of the municipality. The Nordfjorden is a branch of the Søndeledfjorden that flows to the north of the large island of Barmen. Risør Municipality is bordered to the southwest by Tvedestrand Municipality, to the northwest by Vegårshei Municipality and Gjerstad Municipality, and to the northeast by Kragerø Municipality in Telemark county.

== Government ==
Risør Municipality is responsible for primary education (through 10th grade), outpatient health services, senior citizen services, welfare and other social services, zoning, economic development, and municipal roads and utilities. The municipality is governed by a municipal council of directly elected representatives. The mayor is indirectly elected by a vote of the municipal council. The municipality is under the jurisdiction of the Agder District Court and the Agder Court of Appeal.

=== Municipal council ===
The municipal council (Kommunestyre) of Risør Municipality is made up of 29 representatives that are elected to four-year terms. The tables below show the current and historical composition of the council by political party.

Risør kommunestyre 2023–2027
Party name (in Norwegian)	Number of representatives
Labour Party (Arbeiderpartiet)	9
Progress Party (Fremskrittspartiet)	3
Conservative Party (Høyre)	9
Red Party (Rødt)	3
Centre Party (Senterpartiet)	1
Liberal Party (Venstre)	4
Total number of members:	29

Risør kommunestyre 2019–2023
Party name (in Norwegian)	Number of representatives
Labour Party (Arbeiderpartiet)	9
Progress Party (Fremskrittspartiet)	2
Conservative Party (Høyre)	9
Christian Democratic Party (Kristelig Folkeparti)	1
Red Party (Rødt)	3
Centre Party (Senterpartiet)	2
Liberal Party (Venstre)	3
Total number of members:	29

Risør kommunestyre 2015–2019
Party name (in Norwegian)	Number of representatives
Labour Party (Arbeiderpartiet)	13
Progress Party (Fremskrittspartiet)	2
Green Party (Miljøpartiet De Grønne)	1
Conservative Party (Høyre)	5
Christian Democratic Party (Kristelig Folkeparti)	2
Centre Party (Senterpartiet)	1
Liberal Party (Venstre)	5
Total number of members:	29

Risør kommunestyre 2011–2015
Party name (in Norwegian)	Number of representatives
Labour Party (Arbeiderpartiet)	11
Progress Party (Fremskrittspartiet)	2
Conservative Party (Høyre)	5
Christian Democratic Party (Kristelig Folkeparti)	2
Red Party (Rødt)	4
Centre Party (Senterpartiet)	1
Liberal Party (Venstre)	4
Total number of members:	29

Risør kommunestyre 2007–2011
Party name (in Norwegian)	Number of representatives
Labour Party (Arbeiderpartiet)	8
Progress Party (Fremskrittspartiet)	4
Conservative Party (Høyre)	6
Christian Democratic Party (Kristelig Folkeparti)	3
Pensioners' Party (Pensjonistpartiet)	1
Red Electoral Alliance (Rød Valgallianse)	4
Centre Party (Senterpartiet)	1
Liberal Party (Venstre)	4
Total number of members:	31

Risør kommunestyre 2003–2007
Party name (in Norwegian)	Number of representatives
Labour Party (Arbeiderpartiet)	7
Progress Party (Fremskrittspartiet)	2
Conservative Party (Høyre)	7
Christian Democratic Party (Kristelig Folkeparti)	3
Red Electoral Alliance (Rød Valgallianse)	3
Centre Party (Senterpartiet)	5
Socialist Left Party (Sosialistisk Venstreparti)	2
Liberal Party (Venstre)	2
Total number of members:	31

Risør kommunestyre 1999–2003
Party name (in Norwegian)	Number of representatives
Labour Party (Arbeiderpartiet)	8
Progress Party (Fremskrittspartiet)	2
Conservative Party (Høyre)	4
Christian Democratic Party (Kristelig Folkeparti)	4
Red Electoral Alliance (Rød Valgallianse)	3
Centre Party (Senterpartiet)	8
Liberal Party (Venstre)	2
Total number of members:	31

Risør kommunestyre 1995–1999
Party name (in Norwegian)	Number of representatives
Labour Party (Arbeiderpartiet)	10
Progress Party (Fremskrittspartiet)	2
Conservative Party (Høyre)	7
Christian Democratic Party (Kristelig Folkeparti)	3
Red Electoral Alliance (Rød Valgallianse)	2
Centre Party (Senterpartiet)	4
Liberal Party (Venstre)	3
Total number of members:	31

Risør kommunestyre 1991–1995
Party name (in Norwegian)	Number of representatives
Labour Party (Arbeiderpartiet)	12
Progress Party (Fremskrittspartiet)	2
Conservative Party (Høyre)	5
Christian Democratic Party (Kristelig Folkeparti)	4
Red Electoral Alliance (Rød Valgallianse)	1
Centre Party (Senterpartiet)	3
Socialist Left Party (Sosialistisk Venstreparti)	2
Liberal Party (Venstre)	2
Total number of members:	31

Risør kommunestyre 1987–1991
Party name (in Norwegian)	Number of representatives
Labour Party (Arbeiderpartiet)	10
Progress Party (Fremskrittspartiet)	4
Conservative Party (Høyre)	7
Christian Democratic Party (Kristelig Folkeparti)	4
Red Electoral Alliance (Rød Valgallianse)	1
Centre Party (Senterpartiet)	1
Socialist Left Party (Sosialistisk Venstreparti)	1
Liberal Party (Venstre)	3
Total number of members:	31

Risør kommunestyre 1983–1987
Party name (in Norwegian)	Number of representatives
Labour Party (Arbeiderpartiet)	12
Progress Party (Fremskrittspartiet)	2
Conservative Party (Høyre)	7
Christian Democratic Party (Kristelig Folkeparti)	5
Centre Party (Senterpartiet)	1
Socialist Left Party (Sosialistisk Venstreparti)	1
Liberal Party (Venstre)	3
Total number of members:	31

Risør kommunestyre 1979–1983
Party name (in Norwegian)	Number of representatives
Labour Party (Arbeiderpartiet)	10
Conservative Party (Høyre)	7
Christian Democratic Party (Kristelig Folkeparti)	5
Centre Party (Senterpartiet)	1
Socialist Left Party (Sosialistisk Venstreparti)	1
Liberal Party (Venstre)	4
Cross-party list (Tverrpolitisk liste)	3
Total number of members:	31

Risør kommunestyre 1975–1979
Party name (in Norwegian)	Number of representatives
Labour Party (Arbeiderpartiet)	9
Conservative Party (Høyre)	5
Christian Democratic Party (Kristelig Folkeparti)	5
New People's Party (Nye Folkepartiet)	2
Centre Party (Senterpartiet)	1
Liberal Party (Venstre)	1
Cross-party local list (Tverrpolitisk Bygdeliste)	8
Total number of members:	31

Risør kommunestyre 1971–1975
Party name (in Norwegian)	Number of representatives
Labour Party (Arbeiderpartiet)	12
Conservative Party (Høyre)	5
Christian Democratic Party (Kristelig Folkeparti)	5
Centre Party (Senterpartiet)	2
Socialist People's Party (Sosialistisk Folkeparti)	1
Liberal Party (Venstre)	6
Total number of members:	31

Risør kommunestyre 1967–1971
Party name (in Norwegian)	Number of representatives
Labour Party (Arbeiderpartiet)	14
Conservative Party (Høyre)	5
Christian Democratic Party (Kristelig Folkeparti)	5
Centre Party (Senterpartiet)	1
Liberal Party (Venstre)	6
Total number of members:	31

Risør kommunestyre 1963–1967
Party name (in Norwegian)	Number of representatives
Labour Party (Arbeiderpartiet)	14
Conservative Party (Høyre)	5
Christian Democratic Party (Kristelig Folkeparti)	4
Centre Party (Senterpartiet)	1
Liberal Party (Venstre)	7
Total number of members:	31

Risør bystyre 1959–1963
Party name (in Norwegian)	Number of representatives
Labour Party (Arbeiderpartiet)	10
Conservative Party (Høyre)	5
Liberal Party (Venstre)	6
Total number of members:	21

Risør bystyre 1955–1959
Party name (in Norwegian)	Number of representatives
Labour Party (Arbeiderpartiet)	10
Conservative Party (Høyre)	4
Liberal Party (Venstre)	4
Joint List(s) of Non-Socialist Parties (Borgerlige Felleslister)	3
Total number of members:	21

Risør bystyre 1951–1955
Party name (in Norwegian)	Number of representatives
Labour Party (Arbeiderpartiet)	10
Conservative Party (Høyre)	4
Liberal Party (Venstre)	3
Joint List(s) of Non-Socialist Parties (Borgerlige Felleslister)	3
Total number of members:	20

Risør bystyre 1947–1951
Party name (in Norwegian)	Number of representatives
Labour Party (Arbeiderpartiet)	9
Conservative Party (Høyre)	4
Christian Democratic Party (Kristelig Folkeparti)	3
Joint list of the Liberal Party (Venstre) and the Radical People's Party (Radikale Folkepartiet)	4
Total number of members:	20

Risør bystyre 1945–1947
Party name (in Norwegian)	Number of representatives
Labour Party (Arbeiderpartiet)	12
Conservative Party (Høyre)	3
Communist Party (Kommunistiske Parti)	1
Joint list of the Liberal Party (Venstre) and the Radical People's Party (Radikale Folkepartiet)	3
Local List(s) (Lokale lister)	9
Total number of members:	28

Risør bystyre 1937–1941*
Party name (in Norwegian)	Number of representatives
Labour Party (Arbeiderpartiet)	11
Temperance Party (Avholdspartiet)	4
Liberal Party (Venstre)	5
Joint list of the Conservative Party (Høyre) and the Free-minded People's Party (Frisinnede Folkeparti)	8
Total number of members:	28
Note: Due to the German occupation of Norway during World War II, no elections were held for new municipal councils until after the war ended in 1945.

Risør bystyre 1934–1937
Party name (in Norwegian)	Number of representatives
Labour Party (Arbeiderpartiet)	9
Temperance Party (Avholdspartiet)	5
Free-minded People's Party (Frisinnede Folkeparti)	4
Conservative Party (Høyre)	5
Liberal Party (Venstre)	5
Total number of members:	28

Risør bystyre 1931–1934
Party name (in Norwegian)	Number of representatives
Labour Party (Arbeiderpartiet)	8
Temperance Party (Avholdspartiet)	5
Free-minded People's Party (Frisinnede Folkeparti)	4
Conservative Party (Høyre)	5
Liberal Party (Venstre)	6
Total number of members:	28

Risør bystyre 1928–1931
Party name (in Norwegian)	Number of representatives
Labour Party (Arbeiderpartiet)	9
Temperance Party (Avholdspartiet)	6
Free-minded Liberal Party (Frisinnede Venstre)	4
Conservative Party (Høyre)	5
Liberal Party (Venstre)	4
Total number of members:	28

Risør bystyre 1925–1928
Party name (in Norwegian)	Number of representatives
Labour Party (Arbeiderpartiet)	6
Temperance Party (Avholdspartiet)	6
Liberal Party (Venstre)	7
Joint list of the Conservative Party (Høyre) and the Free-minded Liberal Party (Frisinnede Venstre)	9
Total number of members:	28

Risør bystyre 1922–1925
Party name (in Norwegian)	Number of representatives
Labour Party (Arbeiderpartiet)	5
Temperance Party (Avholdspartiet)	7
Liberal Party (Venstre)	6
Joint list of the Conservative Party (Høyre) and the Free-minded Liberal Party (Frisinnede Venstre)	9
Local List(s) (Lokale lister)	1
Total number of members:	28

Risør bystyre 1919–1922
Party name (in Norwegian)	Number of representatives
Labour Party (Arbeiderpartiet)	5
Temperance Party (Avholdspartiet)	5
Liberal Party (Venstre)	9
Joint list of the Conservative Party (Høyre) and the Free-minded Liberal Party (Frisinnede Venstre)	9
Total number of members:	28

=== Mayors ===
The mayor (Norwegian: ordfører) of Risør Municipality is the political leader of the municipality and the chairperson of the municipal council. The following people have held this position:

- 1837–1838: Niels Peter Bøyesen
- 1838–1839: Hans Eilert Steenfeldt
- 1839–1840: Rev. Ulrik Bugge
- 1841–1844: Frederik Christian Hagemann
- 1845–1845: Jacob Wetlesen Prebensen
- 1846–1846: Severin Vincent Heiberg Segelcke
- 1847–1847: Rev. Johan Dürendahl
- 1848–1848: Severin Vincent Heiberg Segelcke
- 1849–1849: Robert Nicolai Hornemann
- 1850–1850: Peter Holm
- 1851–1851: Jacob Wetlesen Prebensen
- 1852–1854: Peter Holm
- 1855–1858: Morten Kjersig Brogaard
- 1859–1859: Dr. Henrik Scheen
- 1859–1859: Rolf Olsen
- 1860–1860: Anders Olsen Huseland
- 1861–1861: Johan Christian Steen
- 1862–1866: Jacob Wetlesen Prebensen
- 1867–1867: Hans Bang
- 1868–1868: Johan Olivarius Horn
- 1868–1869: Johannes Henrik Aas Horn
- 1870–1870: Ole Halvorsen Neergaard
- 1871–1876: Peder Christian Bjørnsgaard
- 1877–1879: Søren Hess Lem Hille
- 1880–1880: Halfdan Torp
- 1880–1909: Jacob Christian Wetlesen Prebensen
- 1910–1910: Ole Petter Ohlsen
- 1911–1913: Anders Grasaas
- 1914–1916: Ole Petter Ohlsen
- 1917–1919: Anders Grasaas
- 1920–1921: Fritz Smith Prebensen
- 1922–1922: Andreas Hansson (V)
- 1923–1923: Fritz Smith Prebensen
- 1924–1927: Mathias J. Nervik
- 1928–1929: Anders Grasaas
- 1930–1930: Rolf Bergendahl
- 1931–1932: Anders Grasaas
- 1933–1934: Thomas Juell
- 1935–1937: Rolf Bergendahl
- 1938–1939: Alexander Prebensen
- 1940–1940: Harald Bjørseth
- 1941–1942: Johannes Kringlebotn (NS)
- 1943–1945: Nils Lønningdahl (NS)
- 1945–1945: Harald Bjørseth
- 1945–1947: Alexander Prebensen
- 1948–1950: Nils Grasaas
- 1951–1951: Leif Juell
- 1952–1952: Mathias Nervik
- 1953–1955: Olaf Larsen
- 1956–1957: Mathias Nervik
- 1958–1959: Arne Myhrvold
- 1960–1963: Mads Victor Norman (H)
- 1964–1967: Jakob Vik
- 1968–1979: Mads Victor Norman (H)
- 1979–1983: Kittil Røysland (H)
- 1983–1987: Odd Moen (KrF)
- 1987–1995: Laila Amalie Skarheim (Ap)
- 1995–2007: Lars Sæland Lauvhjell (Sp)
- 2007–2011: Knut Henning Thygesen (R)
- 2011–2023: Per Kristian Lunden (Ap)
- 2023–present: Kai Strat (H)

=== Politics ===
In the 2007 municipal elections, Risør had the highest vote for the Red Electoral Alliance in Norway at 13.7 per cent. Also, Knut Henning Thygesen was elected as the only mayor from the Red Party through a direct mayor election.

== Transportation ==
Risør is located along the Skagerrak coast. The Stangholmen Lighthouse sits just offshore, marking a shipping channel leading to the town harbour. The European route E18 highway runs along the western edge of the municipality. The Norwegian County Road 416 connects the E18 highway with the town centre in the eastern side of the municipality. Other main roads in Risør include Norwegian County Road 411 and Norwegian County Road 418.

== Economy ==
Risør Municipality historically depended on shipping and industrial industries. The historic timber and fishing industries thrived for a few hundred years, but now they have mostly vanished. Paper production served as an economic basis for a time, until the pulp factory was closed in 1970. Today Risør is more of a tourist destination with a burgeoning art colony and music festivals. Summer vacationers account for a major part of the economy.

== Attractions ==
Risør has many tourist attractions.

- A world class chamber music festival, is held in late June
- A bluegrass music-festival every mid-July. Norway's only festival of its kind.
- A popular artists’ market (Villvinmarked or "Villvin-festival") is held in July
- A wooden boat festival (Trebåtfestival) is held in August. During the festival the population swells to 20,000 people.
- Den Hellige Ånds Church, built in 1647
- The citadel at Tangen, a fortification from the Napoleonic Wars (with modifications from the German occupation period)
- Risør Akvarium, salt water aquarium with over 100 different species. The only salt water aquarium in the south region of Norway.
- Risør Underwater Post Office, is established in 2004.

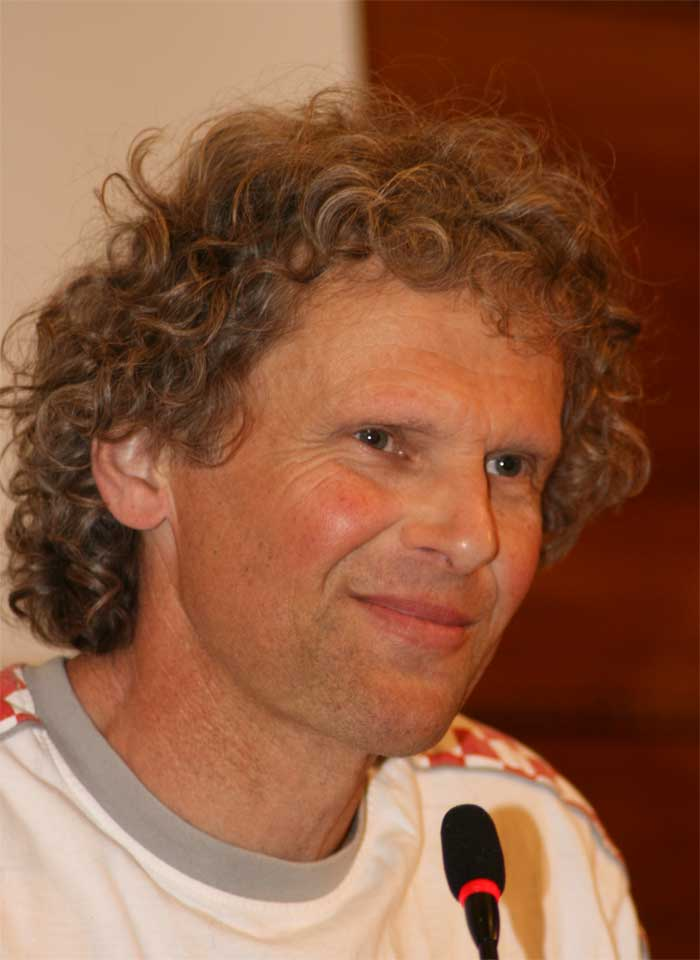
K.H. Thygesen

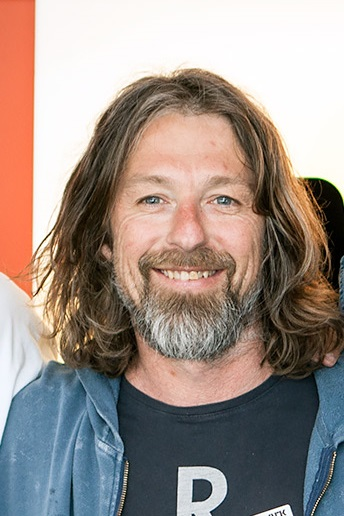
Erik Mykland

== Notable people ==
- Isak Lauritssøn Falck (1601–1669), a land-owner and timber merchant who developed the growing town of Risør
- Christian Jensen Lofthuus (1750-1797), a peasant who led a revolt in 1786 called Lofthusreisingen
- Henrik Carstensen (1753–1835), a timber merchant, shipowner, rep. Norwegian Constituent Assembly
- Carsten Henrik Bruun (1828–1907), a shipmaster of whaling vessels, also involved in sealing
- Nikolai Prebensen (1850–1938), a politician and County Governor of Finnmark & Aust-Agder
- Dikken Zwilgmeyer (1853–1913), a fiction writer of children's literature
- Isak Martinius Skaugen (1875–1962), a sea captain who founded I. M. Skaugen a shipping co.
- Ove Ansteinsson (1884–1942), a journalist and author
- Per Sunderland (1924–2012), a stage and film actor
- Victor D. Norman (born 1946), a politician & professor of economy and rector at NHH
- Carl Magnus Neumann (born 1944), a jazz saxophonist who lived in Risør starting in 2000
- Knut Henning Thygesen (born 1953), an author, politician, and mayor of Risør in 2007
- Erik Mykland (born 1971), a footballer with 371 club caps and 78 for Norway
