= Sigurd Marcussen =

Norwegian politician

Sigurd Marcussen (20 April 1905 – 20 December 2006) was a Norwegian politician for the Labour Party.

In 1935, he was elected to the municipal council of Risør Municipality. After the Second World War he moved to the rural, neighboring Søndeled Municipality and was elected to the municipal council there in 1951, but never took the seat as he got a leading position in his trade union. He served as a deputy representative to the Parliament of Norway from Aust-Agder during the term 1950–1953. In 2006 he was awarded honorary membership of his party.
