= Thygesen =

Thygesen is a surname. Notable people with the surname include:

- Jesper Thygesen (born 1969), Danish football director, commentator and former player
- Knut Henning Thygesen (born 1953), Norwegian author and politician
- Mikkel Thygesen (born 1984), Danish footballer
- Poul-Erik Thygesen (born 1950), Danish footballer
- Sara Thygesen (born 1991), Danish badminton player

== See also ==
- Meanings of minor planet names: 23001–24000#749
