= Frydendal Church =

Church in Agder, Norway

- Frydendal kirke
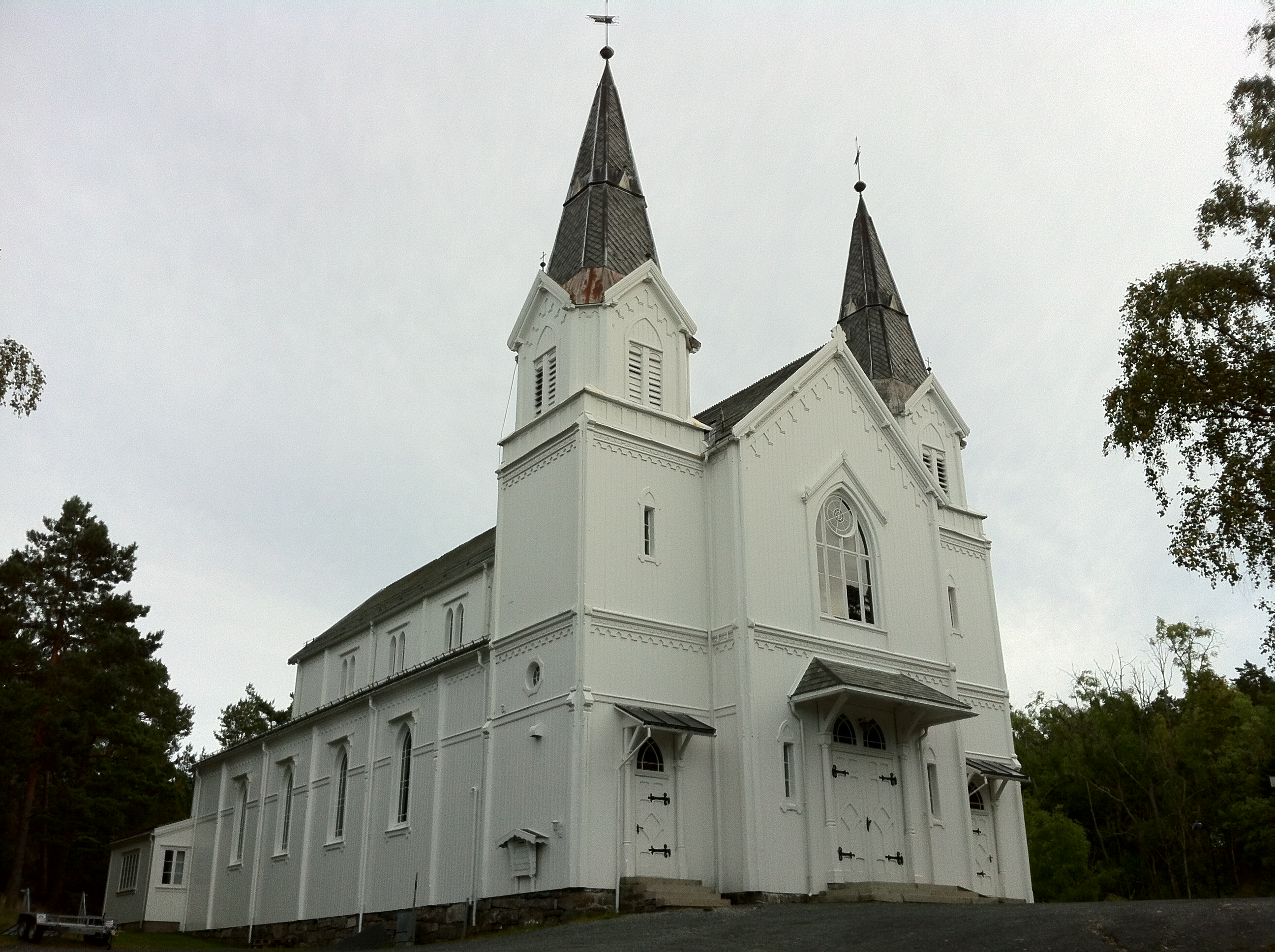
- View of the church
- Frydendal Church
- 58.71717°N 09.208820°E
- Location: Risør Municipality, Agder
- Country: Norway
- Denomination: Church of Norway
- Churchmanship: Evangelical Lutheran

History
- Former name: Ytre Søndeled Church
- Status: Parish church
- Founded: 1879
- Consecrated: 20 Aug 1879

Architecture
- Functional status: Active
- Architect: Henrik Nissen
- Architectural type: Long church
- Style: Neo-Gothic basilica
- Completed: 1879 (147 years ago)

Specifications
- Capacity: 300
- Materials: Wood

Administration
- Diocese: Agder og Telemark
- Deanery: Aust-Nedenes prosti
- Parish: Risør
- Norwegian Cultural Heritage Site
- Type: Church
- Status: Listed
- ID: 85895

Frydendal Church (Norwegian: Frydendal kirke) is a parish church of the Church of Norway in Risør Municipality in Agder county, Norway. It is located in the town of Risør. It is one of the two churches for the Risør parish which is part of the Aust-Nedenes prosti (deanery) in the Diocese of Agder og Telemark. The white, wooden church was built in a long church design in 1879 using plans drawn up by the architect Henrik Nissen. The church seats about 300 people.

== History ==
The saga of Olav Trygvasson talks about a church in Søndelef in Visedal an old name for the prestegjeld of Gjerstad. The church is mentioned in several historical documents dating back to the 1200s. The churches in Søndeled, Vegårshei, and Gjerstad were all part of the same parish based in Gjerstad until 1745 when Søndeled (which included Risør was separated to form its own prestegjeld. In 1877, Søndeled and Risør were split into two parishes. The town had Risør Church and the rest remained in Søndeled. The large parish of Søndeled was split into two parts and a new church was built in Frydendal, just outside the town of Risør. The old church was renamed Indre Søndeled (meaning "inner" - further from the ocean) and the new church was named Ytre Søndeled (meaning "outer" - closer to the ocean).

The new church was completed in 1879. It was designed by Henrik Nissen from Kristiania, and it was designed in a neo-Gothic basilica style. The church cost 41,884 kr to complete at that time. The new church was consecrated on 20 August 1879 by the priest from Søndeled Church, H.A. Arnesen, since the Bishop Jørgen Moe was ill. The church has a typical long church design with twin towers on the west end on either side of the main entrance.

In 1928, the church was renovated and refurbished, just in time for its 50th anniversary. Prior to 2006, the church was called Ytre Søndeled Church and it was part of the Ytre Søndeled parish. In 2006, the Ytre Søndeled parish was merged into the Risør parish and the church was renamed Frydendal Church.

== Media gallery ==
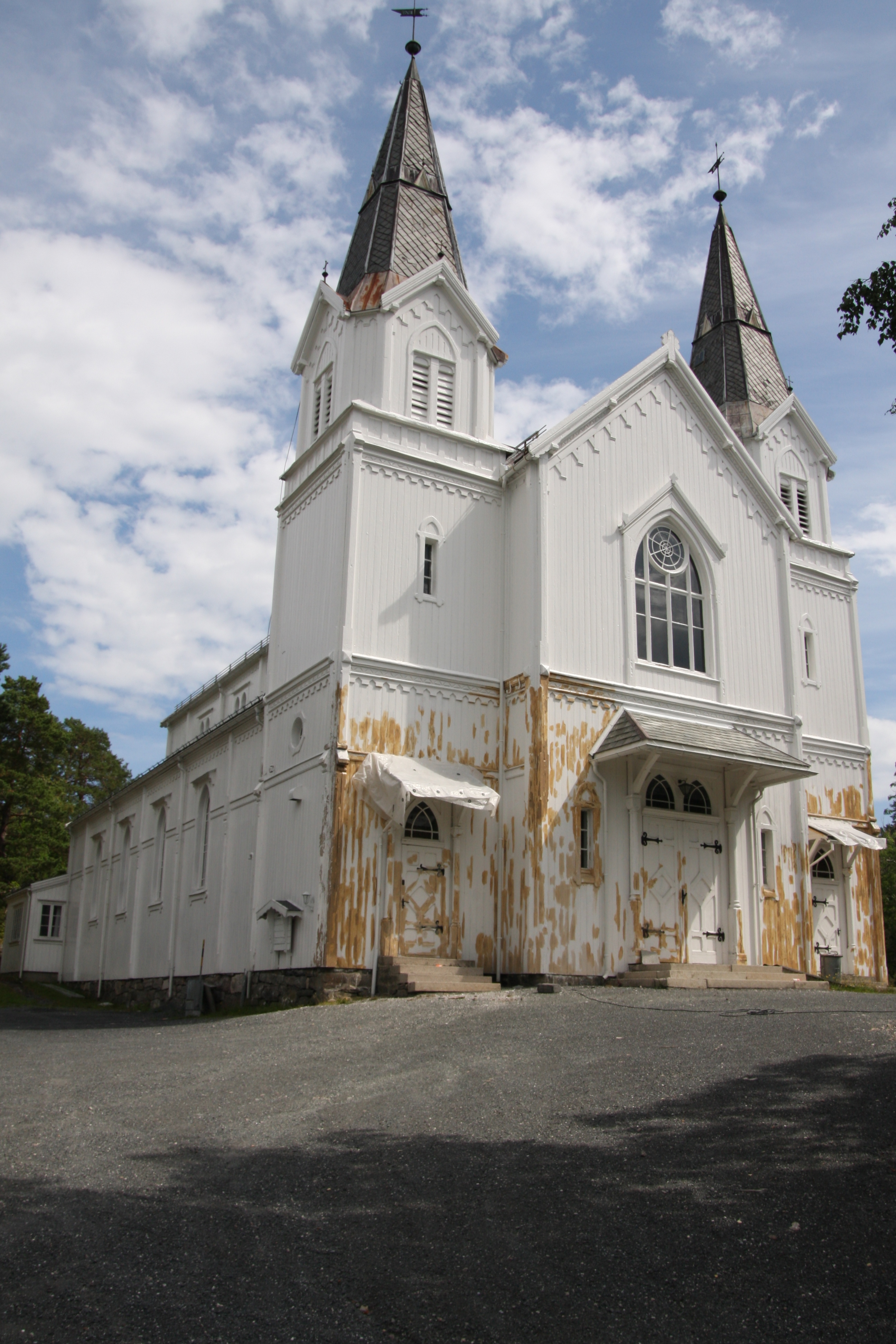
Front of the church

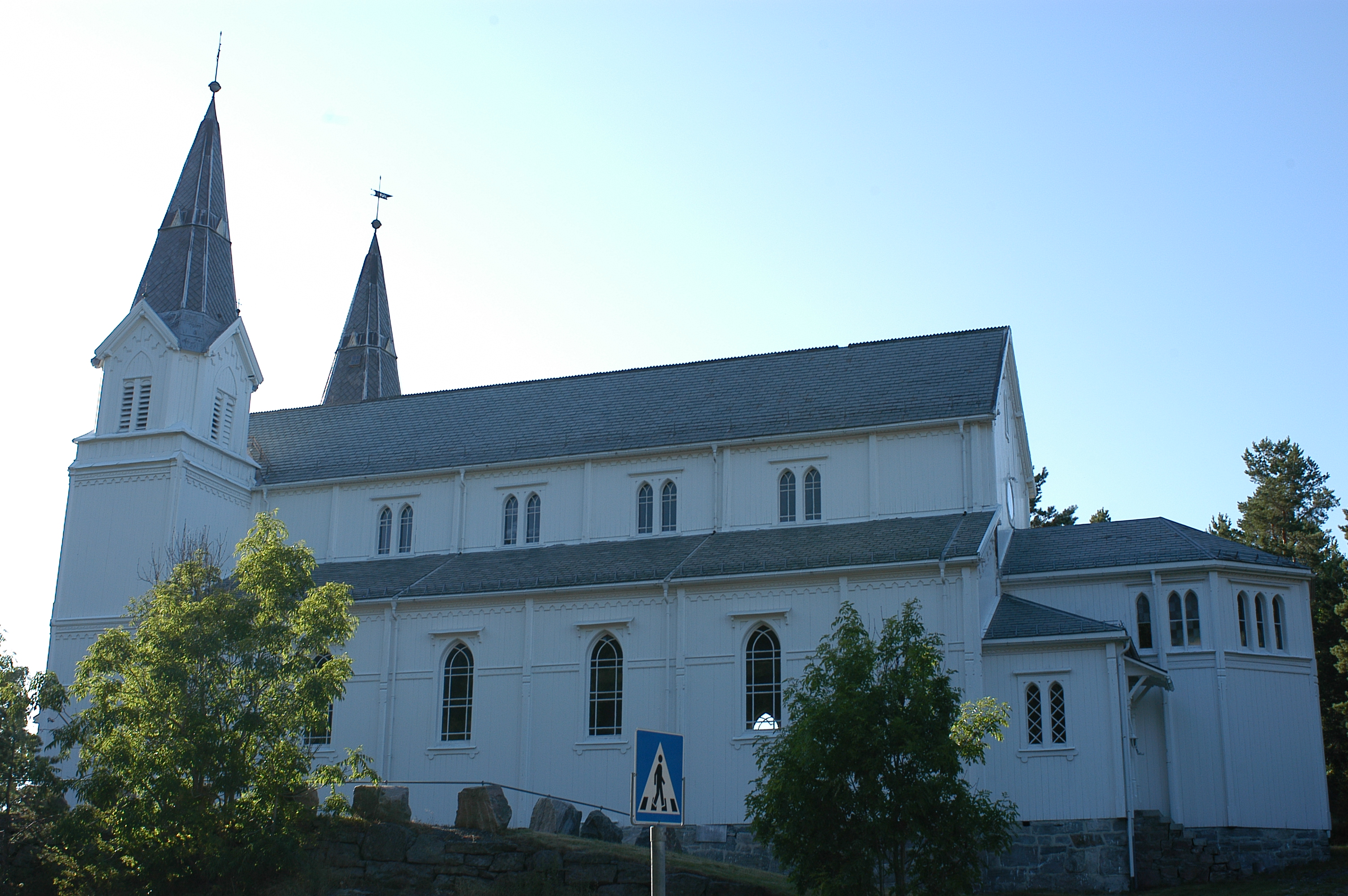
Side of the church

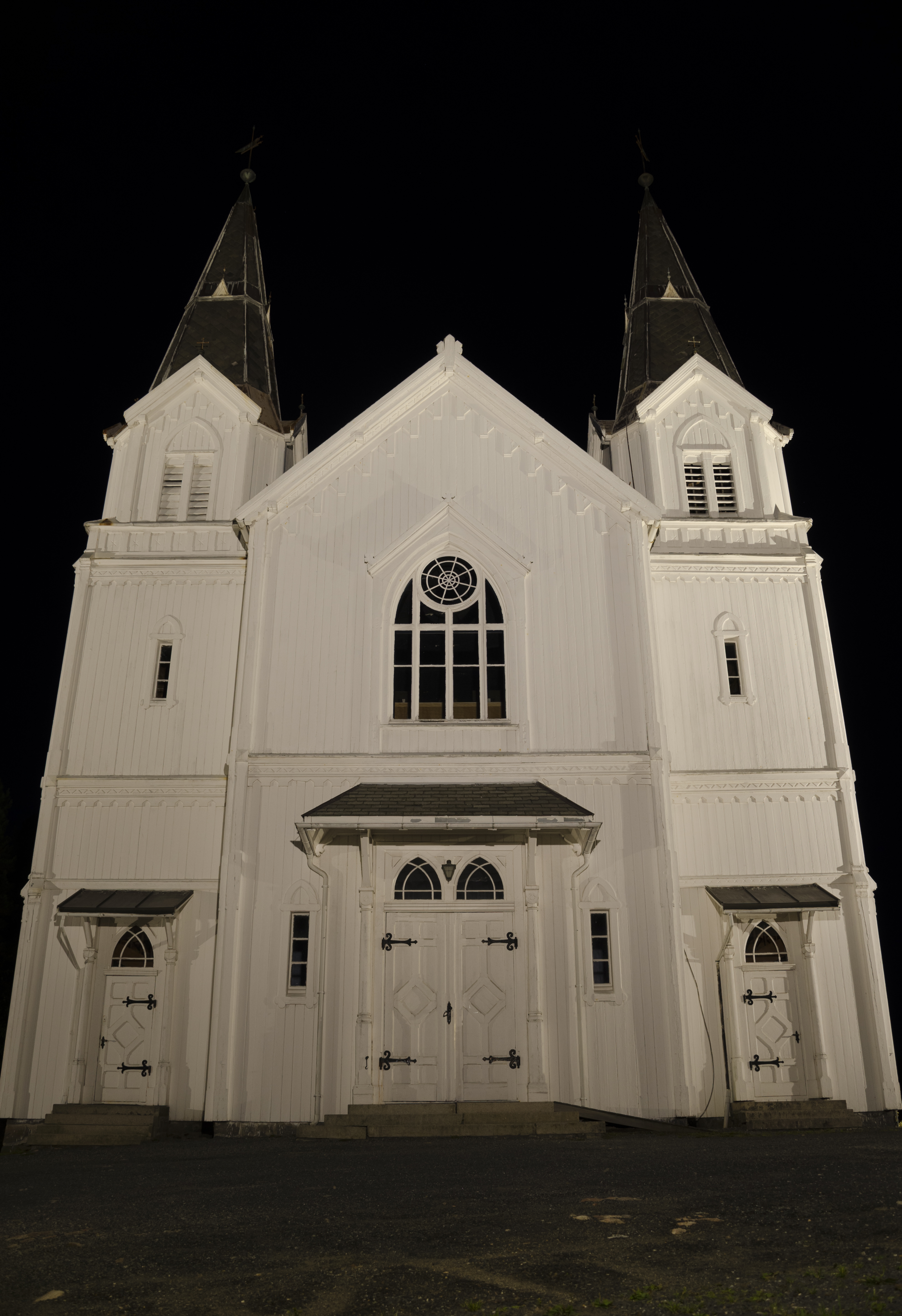
View of the church at night

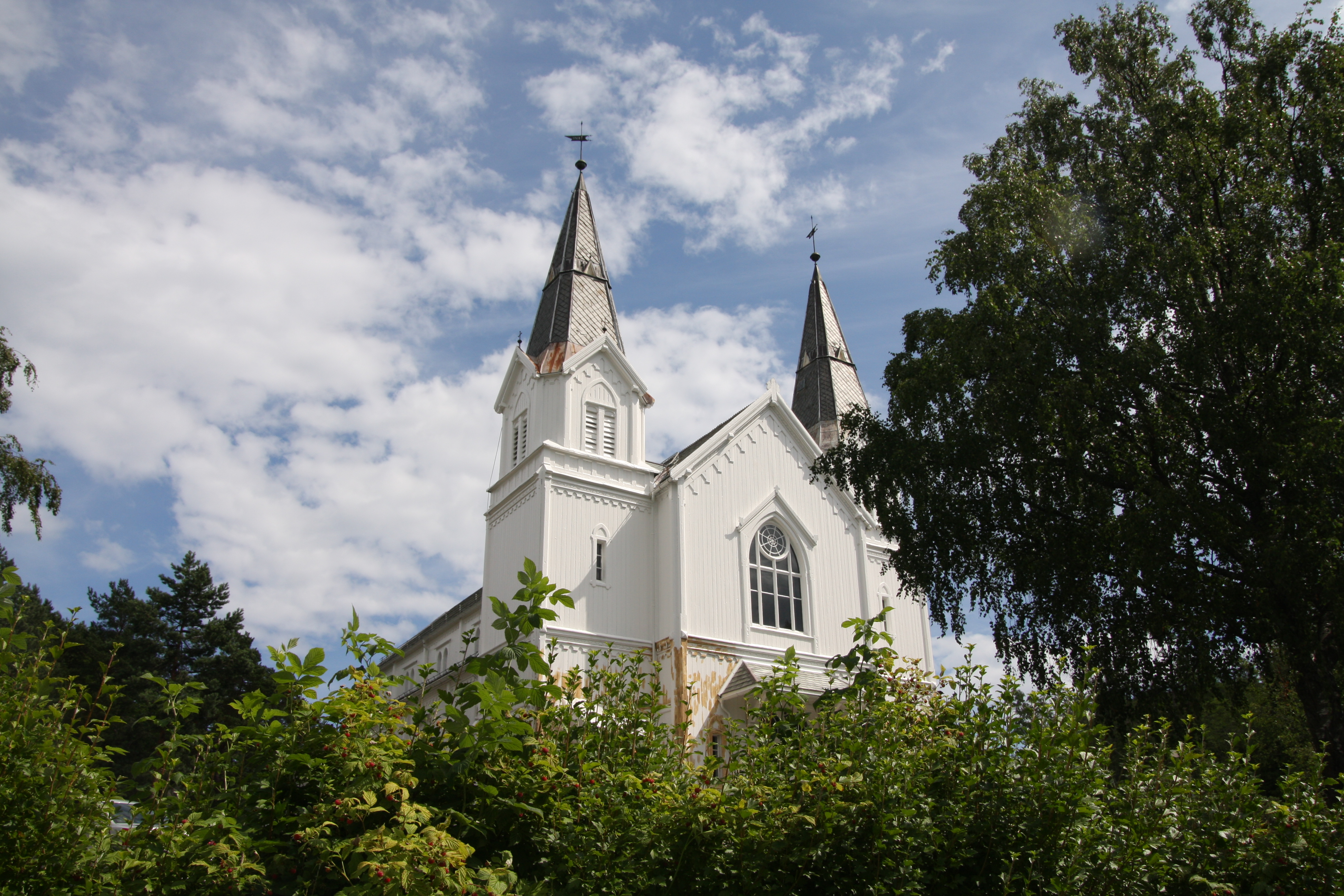
Alternate view

== See also ==
- List of churches in Agder og Telemark
