= Risør Church =

Church in Agder, Norway

- Risør kirke Den Hellige Ånds kirke
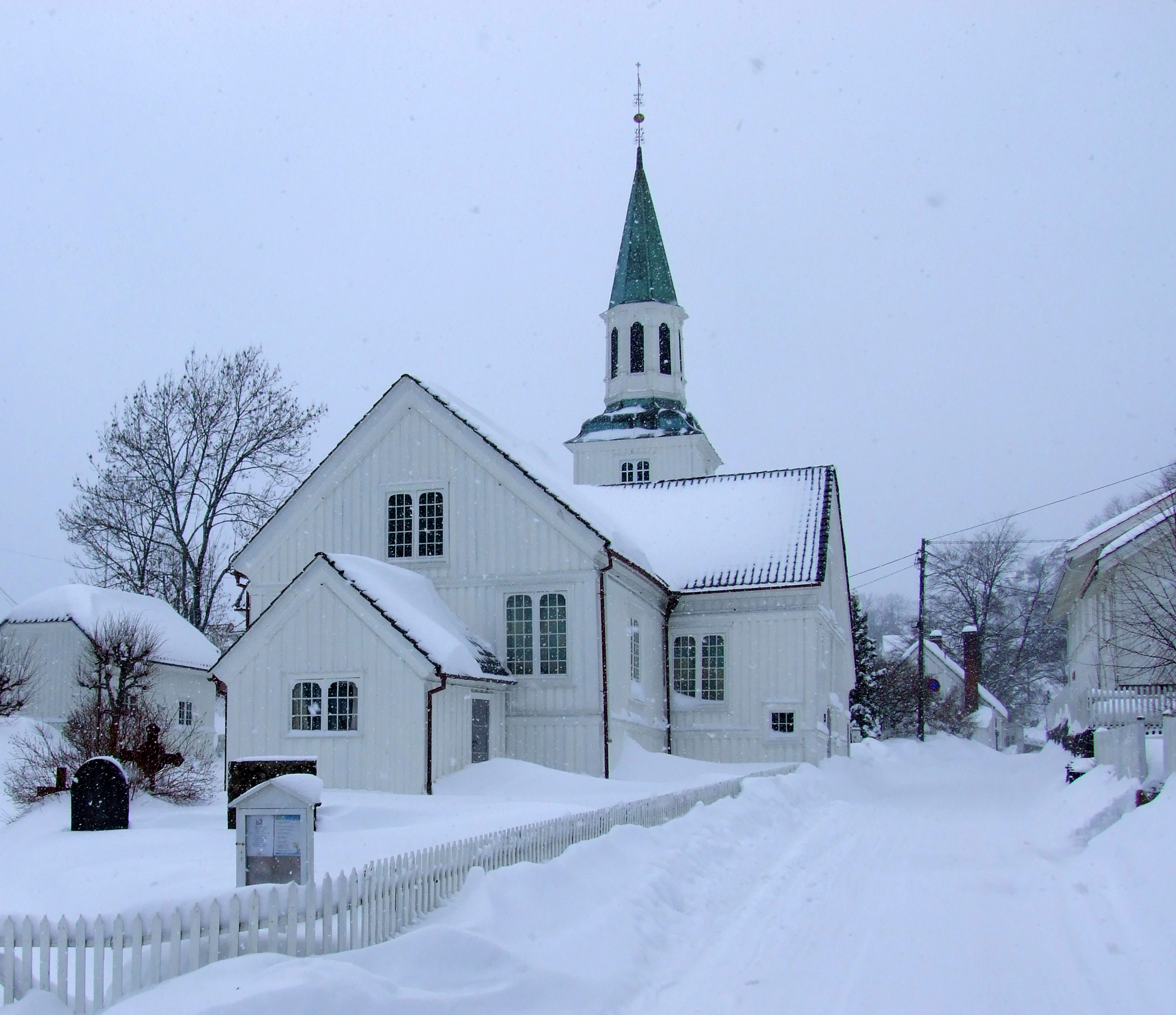
- View of the church
- Risør Church
- 58.721422°N 09.230704°E
- Location: Risør Municipality, Agder
- Country: Norway
- Denomination: Church of Norway
- Churchmanship: Evangelical Lutheran

History
- Status: Parish church
- Founded: 1647
- Consecrated: 1647
- Events: 1928: Renovation

Architecture
- Functional status: Active
- Architectural type: Cruciform
- Completed: 1647 (379 years ago)

Specifications
- Capacity: 450
- Materials: Wood

Administration
- Diocese: Agder og Telemark
- Deanery: Aust-Nedenes prosti
- Parish: Risør
- Norwegian Cultural Heritage Site
- Type: Church
- Status: Automatically protected
- ID: 85304

Risør Church (Norwegian: Risør kirke or Den Hellige Ånds kirke) is a parish church of the Church of Norway in Risør Municipality in Agder county, Norway. It is located in the town of Risør. It is one of the two churches for the Risør parish which is part of the Aust-Nedenes prosti (deanery) in the Diocese of Agder og Telemark. The white, wooden church was built in a cruciform design in 1647 using plans drawn up by an unknown architect. The church seats about 450 people.

== History ==
The area of Risør was part of the Søndeled Church parish which was historically an annex of the prestegjeld of Gjerstad. The town of Risør was growing during the 1600s and the nearest church was quite a distance away in Søndeled. So, a new church was built in the town in 1647. The church was consecrated in the summer of 1647 by the local Provost Salve Thomæson from Øyestad Church. The church was named Den Hellige Ånds kirke which means "Church of the Holy Spirit".

In 1721, the church received exterior panel siding. In 1733, the small tower on the roof was torn down and a new, larger tower was added over a new entry on the west end of the building. In 1739, a sacristy was built on the east end of the chancel. Both the tower and sacristy were built by Johannes Omholt. In 1794, merchant Nils Simonsen and his wife paid for a curved gate to be built in the opening between the choir and the nave. At the top of the carved gate sat the royal monogram for Christian VII. The gate was removed in 1848, but the monogram was kept and hung on the wall by the gallery stairs. In 1855, the interior walls were clad with panels. In 1880, the interior balcony seating was rebuilt. The church was renovated and restored in 1928 under the direction of the architect Ole Øvergaard.

=== Election church ===
In 1814, this church served as an election church (Norwegian: valgkirke). Together with more than 300 other parish churches across Norway, it was a polling station for elections to the 1814 Norwegian Constituent Assembly which wrote the Constitution of Norway. This was Norway's first national elections. Each church parish was a constituency that elected people called "electors" who later met together in each county to elect the representatives for the assembly that was to meet at Eidsvoll Manor later that year.

== Media gallery ==
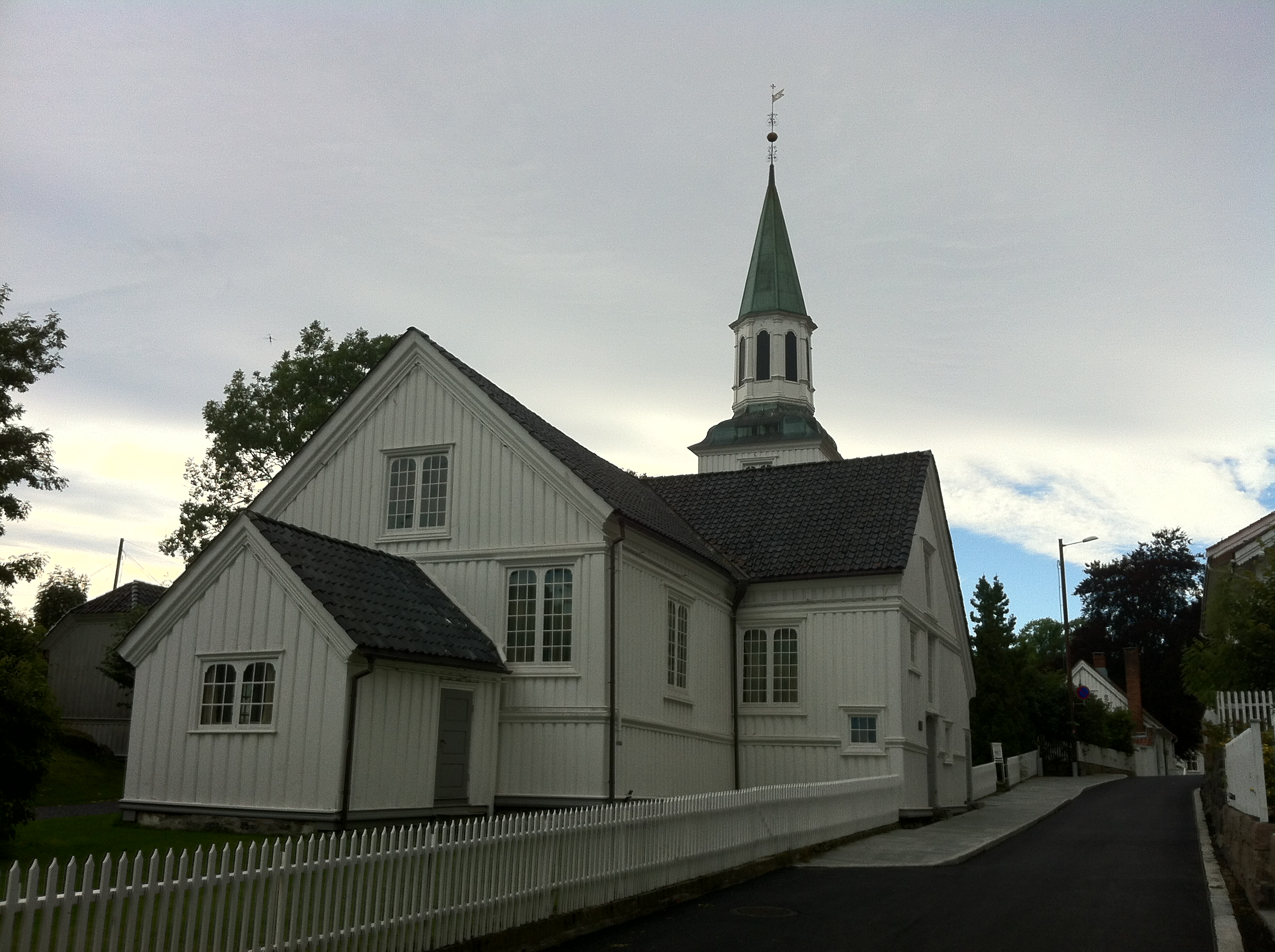
Exterior view

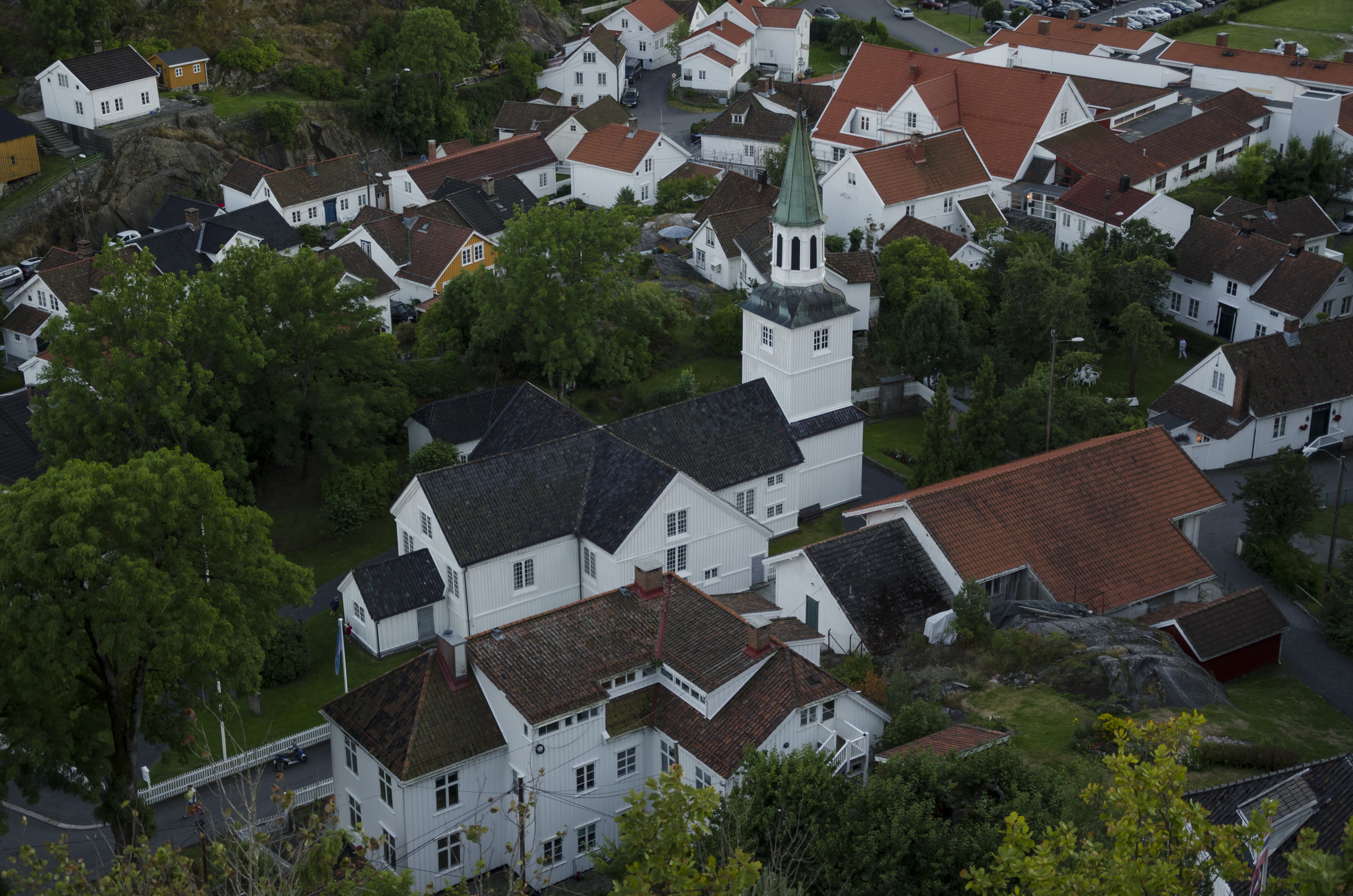
Aerial view of the church

== See also ==
- List of churches in Agder og Telemark
