= Stamsøy =

Village in Risør Municipality, Norway

- Village
- Interactive map of Stamsøy
- Coordinates: 58.7518°N 09.1323°E
- Country: Norway
- Region: Southern Norway
- County: Agder
- District: Østre Agder
- Municipality: Risør Municipality
- Elevation: 69 m (226 ft)
- Time zone: UTC+01:00 (CET)
  - Summer (DST): UTC+02:00 (CEST)
- Post Code: 4990 Søndeled

Stamsøy is a village in Risør Municipality in Agder county, Norway. The village is located along the north shore of the Søndeledfjorden, about 4 kilometres (2.5 mi) east of the village of Søndeled and about 3 kilometres (1.9 mi) west of the village of Sivik.

The historic spelling of the name, Stamsø, is also a family name for a number of people in the region. The Stamsø family name has roots that can be traced several centuries back in time. There was once a school at Stamsø, but it is no longer in use.
