= Coat of arms of Risør =

Coat of arms of Risør. The official version has a silver mural crown.

The Coat of arms of Risør was approved by King Oscar II of Norway on 18 July 1891. It depicts a fortification protruding from the sea. This fortification is a symbol of Holmen battery which was built in 1788 and manned during the Napoleonic Wars of 1807 to 1814. The coat of arms was approved in a very unusual way as it was first used as a decoration on the dinner menus used for the King's visit to Risør in 1891. During the course of dinner the king approved the design by writing Våbnet approberes Oscar 1891 18/7 (The coat of arms is approved) on one of the menus. This was the first new approval of a Norwegian coat of arms in 150 years and the only time it happened outside state council. The coat of arms had been in the making for quite some time and the design had been approved by the National archive of Norway (the heraldic authority) and later by the city council on 13 July. One architect Thorsen of Christiania is credited with the idea and artist Wilhelm Krogh did the final design.

== Sources ==
- Risør municipality general info on the coat of arms (Norwegian)
- Risør municipality longer article on the origins of the coat of arms (Norwegian)
