= Isak Lauritssøn Falck =

Isak Lauritssøn Falck (1601 – 9 March 1669) was a Norwegian land owner and timber merchant. He is associated with the development of the seaport of Risør in Nedenes county, Norway.

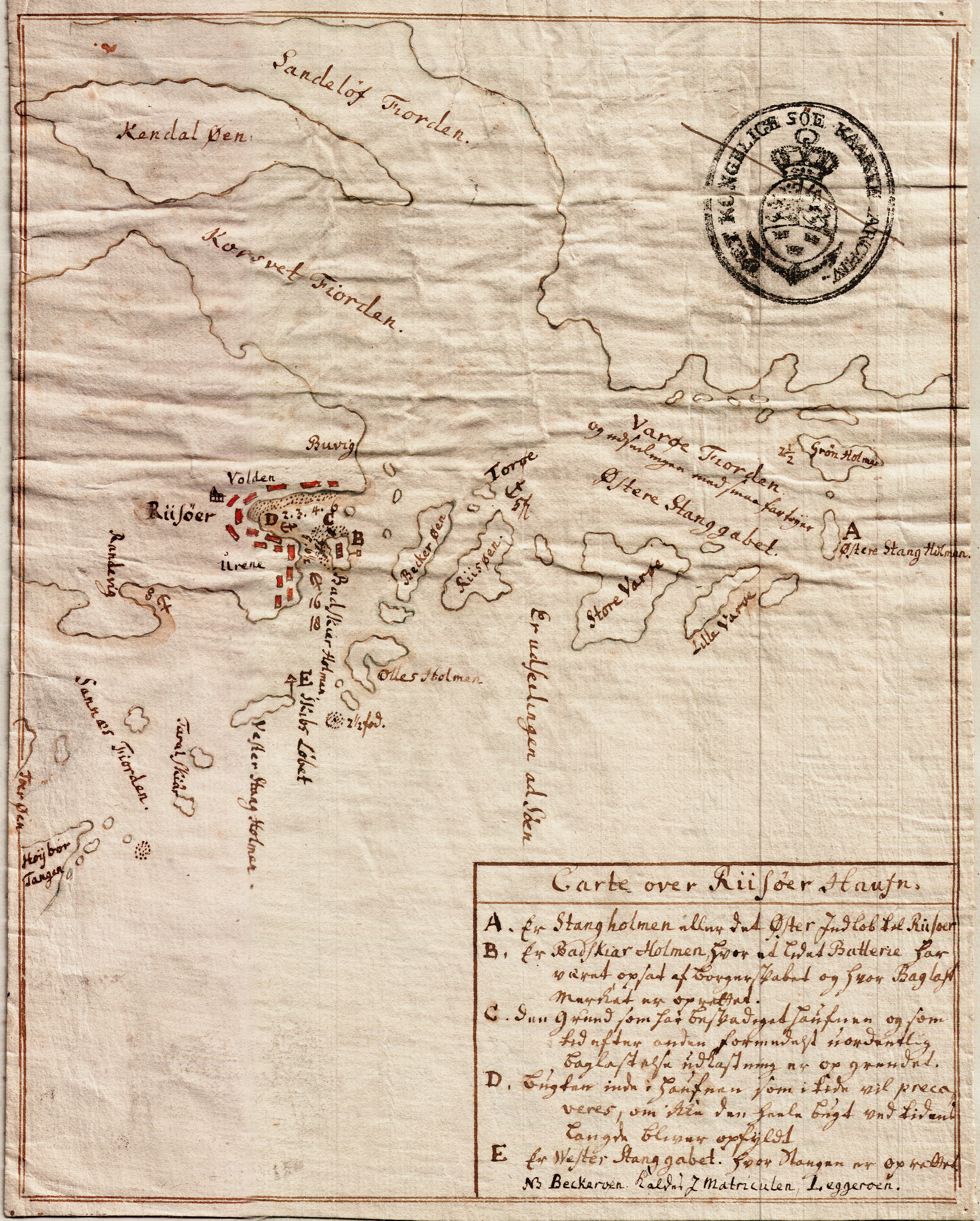
Historic map of Risør

He was born in Sandeherred (now part of Sandefjord Municipality) in Vestfold, Norway. He was the son of merchant Laurits Kristoffersen, a lumber merchant in Tønsberg. He settled in Risør during the 1620s. He acquired several farms with significant forests, started saw mills, and established a shipyard on the island of Badskjærholmen (now Holmen). In the 1650s, he bought the farm Randvik at Søndeled in Nedenes county, which included the harbour of Risør and surrounding areas.

In 1630, Risør became a privileged port (ladested) where citizens had the right to engage in trade and commodity importing, especially with lumber. Traders and merchants from the Netherlands were the principal recipients of the timber export. Risør operated as a port under the jurisdiction of Skien from 1630 and under Kristiansand from 1641. In 1659, the port built a custom house.
