= Søndeledfjorden =

Fjord in Agder, Norway

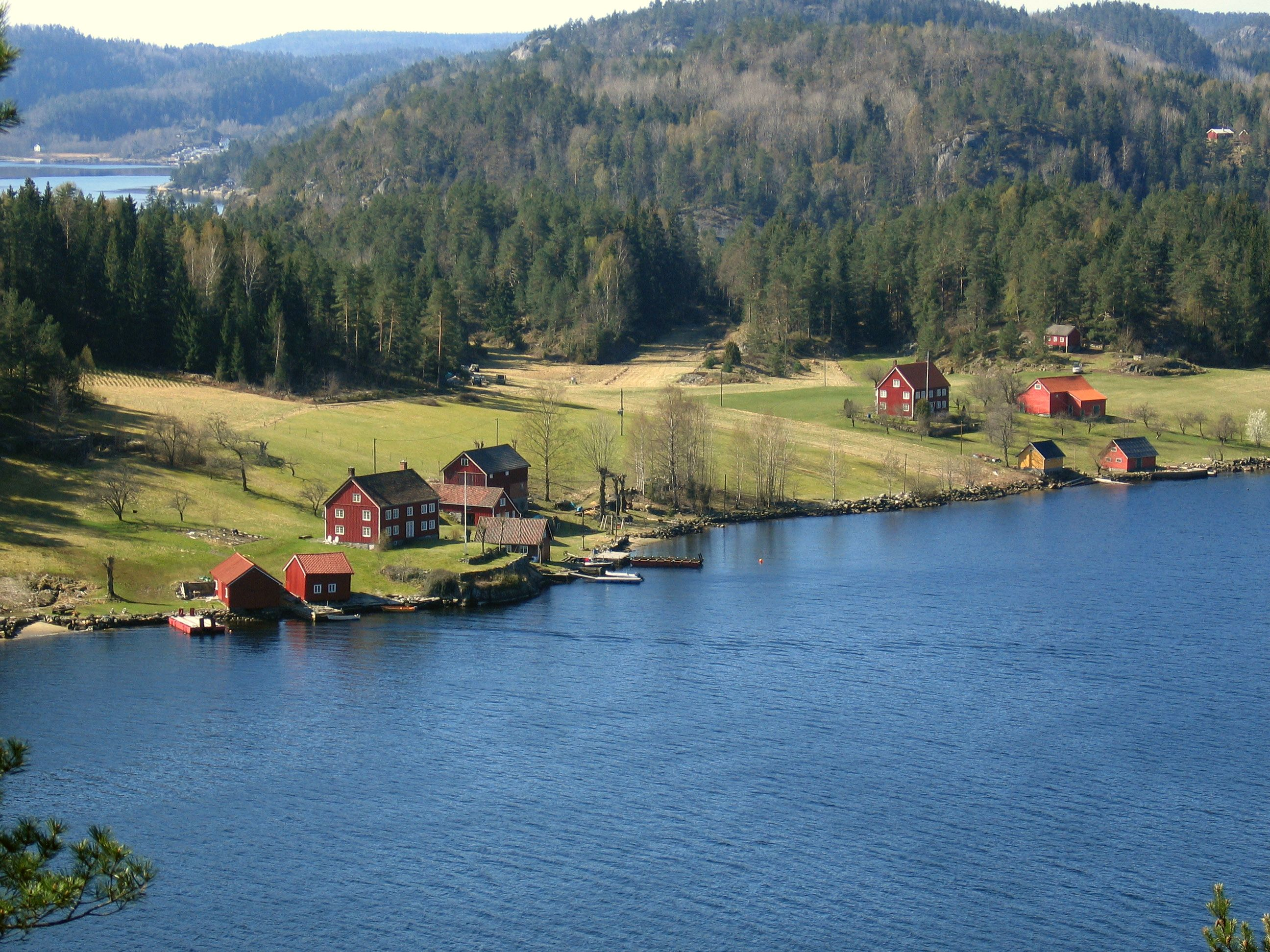
- View of the shoreline along the fjord
- Interactive map of the fjord
- Location: Agder county, Norway
- Coordinates: 58.7553°N 09.0709°E
- Type: Fjord
- Primary inflows: Brobøvann
- Primary outflows: Skagerrak
- Basin countries: Norway
- Max. length: 15 kilometres (9.3 mi)
- Max. width: 2 kilometres (1.2 mi)
- Islands: Barmen, Frøyna
- Settlements: Risør

Søndeledfjorden is a fjord in Risør Municipality in Agder county, Norway. The 15-kilometre (9.3 mi) long fjord begins at the village of Søndeled and flows east into the Skaggerak. The large island of Barmen sits in the middle of the fjord, effectively separating it into two fjords known as the Nordfjorden in the north and the Sørfjorden in the south. At the western end of Barmen, the Nordfjorden and Sørfjorden reconnect in an area known as the Rødsfjorden. There are many islands at the mouth of the fjord as well as in the fjord itself.

The town of Risør sits at the end of a peninsula on the south side of the mainland at the entrance to the fjord. There are many villages located around the fjord as well. On the south side, there are the villages of Moen and Bossvika, and on the north side, there are the villages of Sivik and Stamsø. The Norwegian County Road 416 runs along the southern coast of the fjord.

== See also ==
- List of Norwegian fjords
