= Sivik =

Village in Risør Municipality, Norway

- Village
- Interactive map of Sivik
- Coordinates: 58.7534°N 09.1778°E
- Country: Norway
- Region: Southern Norway
- County: Agder
- District: Østre Agder
- Municipality: Risør Municipality
- Elevation: 31 m (102 ft)
- Time zone: UTC+01:00 (CET)
  - Summer (DST): UTC+02:00 (CEST)
- Post Code: 4990 Søndeled

Sivik is a village in Risør Municipality in Agder county, Norway. The village is located along the northern shore of the Søndeledfjorden, about 3 kilometres (1.9 mi) east of the village of Stamsøy.
