= Knut Henning Thygesen =

Norwegian politician (born 1953)

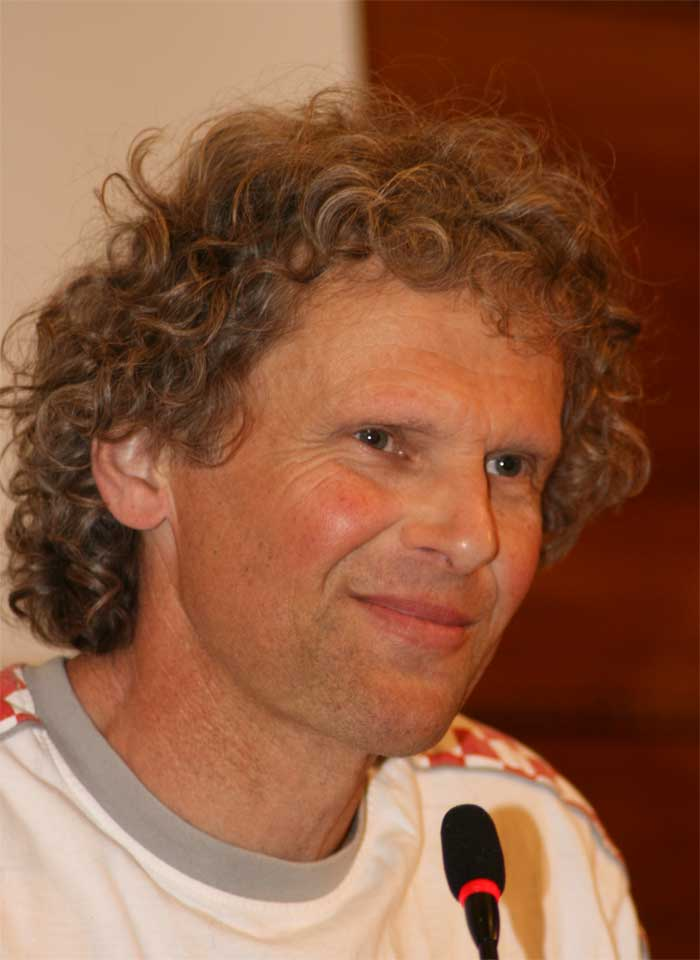

Mayor of Risør
- In office 2007–2011
- Preceded by: Lars Lauvhjell
- Majority: 44.5%

Personal details
- Born: 7 April 1953 (age 73) Risør, Norway
- Party: Red
- Education: Norwegian Institute of Technology
- Profession: Architect

Knut Henning Thygesen (born 7 April 1953) is a Norwegian author and politician for the Red Party. He was elected as mayor of Risør on 11 September 2007 in a direct mayor election as part of the 2007 municipal election with 44.5% of the votes. He is the only mayor ever for Red or any of its predecessors.

== Biography ==
Born in Risør, Norway, he started education as an architect from the Norwegian Institute of Technology in Trondheim where he among other things was editor of the student newspaper Under Dusken. After two years he moved to Bærum Municipality and started training as a construction worker. After finishing his qualifications he moved back to Risør. He spent 1979 in the Royal Norwegian Army. He has worked as a construction worker, architect, teacher and as an author since.

== Politics ==
Thygesen's interest for politics started at upper secondary school in the early 1970s, with the three topics Norwegian EEC membership, the protest against the Vietnam War and environmentalism. He was heavily engaged in the protests against the planned nuclear power plants that were suggested built in Risør.

Both in Trondheim, Bærum and in the army he studied marxism and environmentalism. He protested the Soviet Union's suppression of Eastern European countries. In 1978 he joined Red Youth (RU) and created one of the largest RU chapters in the country. He also for a shorter period was a member of the Workers' Communist Party.

Tygesen was a candidate for Red Electoral Alliance (what is now Red) for the first time in the 1983 election, but was not elected. But in the 1987 election he was elected and was elected for the sixth time in 2007 election. The last period he has also sat on the executive board. He was elected directly as mayor in the 2007 as the first mayor for Red in history.
