= Søndeled Church =

Church in Agder, Norway

- Søndeled kirke
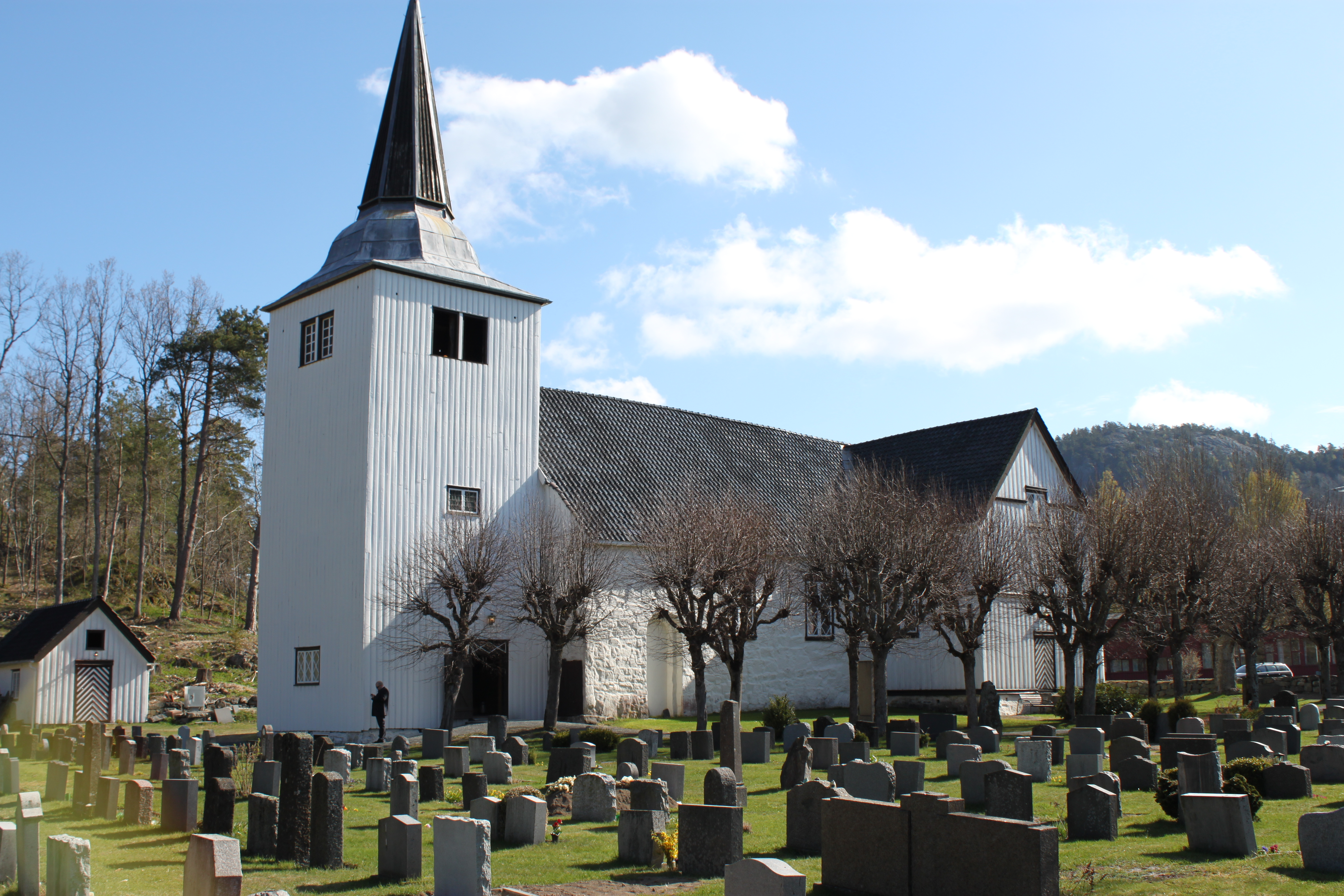
- View of the church
- Søndeled Church
- 58.76313°N 09.07986°E
- Location: Risør Municipality, Agder
- Country: Norway
- Denomination: Church of Norway
- Previous denomination: Catholic Church
- Churchmanship: Evangelical Lutheran

History
- Former name: Indre Søndeled Church
- Status: Parish church
- Founded: c. 1150
- Consecrated: c. 1150

Architecture
- Functional status: Active
- Architectural type: Cruciform
- Completed: c. 1150 (876 years ago)

Specifications
- Capacity: 450
- Materials: Stone/wood

Administration
- Diocese: Agder og Telemark
- Deanery: Aust-Nedenes prosti
- Parish: Søndeled
- Norwegian Cultural Heritage Site
- Type: Church
- Status: Automatically protected
- ID: 84718

Søndeled Church (Norwegian: Søndeled kirke) is a parish church of the Church of Norway in Risør Municipality in Agder county, Norway. It is located in the village of Søndeled. It is the church for the Søndeled parish which is part of the Aust-Nedenes prosti (deanery) in the Diocese of Agder og Telemark. The white, stone and wood church was built in a cruciform design around the year 1150 using plans drawn up by an unknown architect. The church seats about 450 people.

== History ==
The earliest existing historical records of the church date back to the year 1320, but the church was likely built during the mid- to late-1100s. The saga of Olav Trygvasson talks about a church in Søndelef in Visedal an old name for the prestegjeld of Gjerstad. The church is mentioned in several historical documents dating back to the 1200s. The churches in Søndeled, Vegårshei, and Gjerstad were all part of the same parish based in Gjerstad until 1745 when Søndeled (which included Risør was separated to form its own prestegjeld. In 1877, Søndeled and Risør were split into two parishes. The town had Risør Church and the rest remained in Søndeled. The large parish of Søndeled was split into two parts and a new church was built in Frydendal, just outside the town of Risør. The old church was renamed Indre Søndeled (meaning "inner" - further from the ocean) and the new church was named Ytre Søndeled (meaning "outer" - closer to the ocean).

The original Romanesque stone building had a rectangular nave with a smaller choir. In 1723, the church was purchased from the King by the people who live in the parish. The King sold the church to raise money to pay off his war debts. In 1752, a wooden tower was added on the west end of the building. In 1768, the old choir was demolished and the church was enlarged. New wings were added to the north and south and a new choir was built on the east. The result was a new cruciform design, with three of the four wings constructed in wood and the fourth wing on the west being the remaining medieval stone structure. In 1772, the tower was rebuilt. In 1775, the exterior of the church was clad with new siding.

In 1814, this church served as an election church (Norwegian: valgkirke). Together with more than 300 other parish churches across Norway, it was a polling station for elections to the 1814 Norwegian Constituent Assembly which wrote the Constitution of Norway. This was Norway's first national elections. Each church parish was a constituency that elected people called "electors" who later met together in each county to elect the representatives for the assembly that was to meet at Eidsvoll Manor later that year.

== Media gallery ==
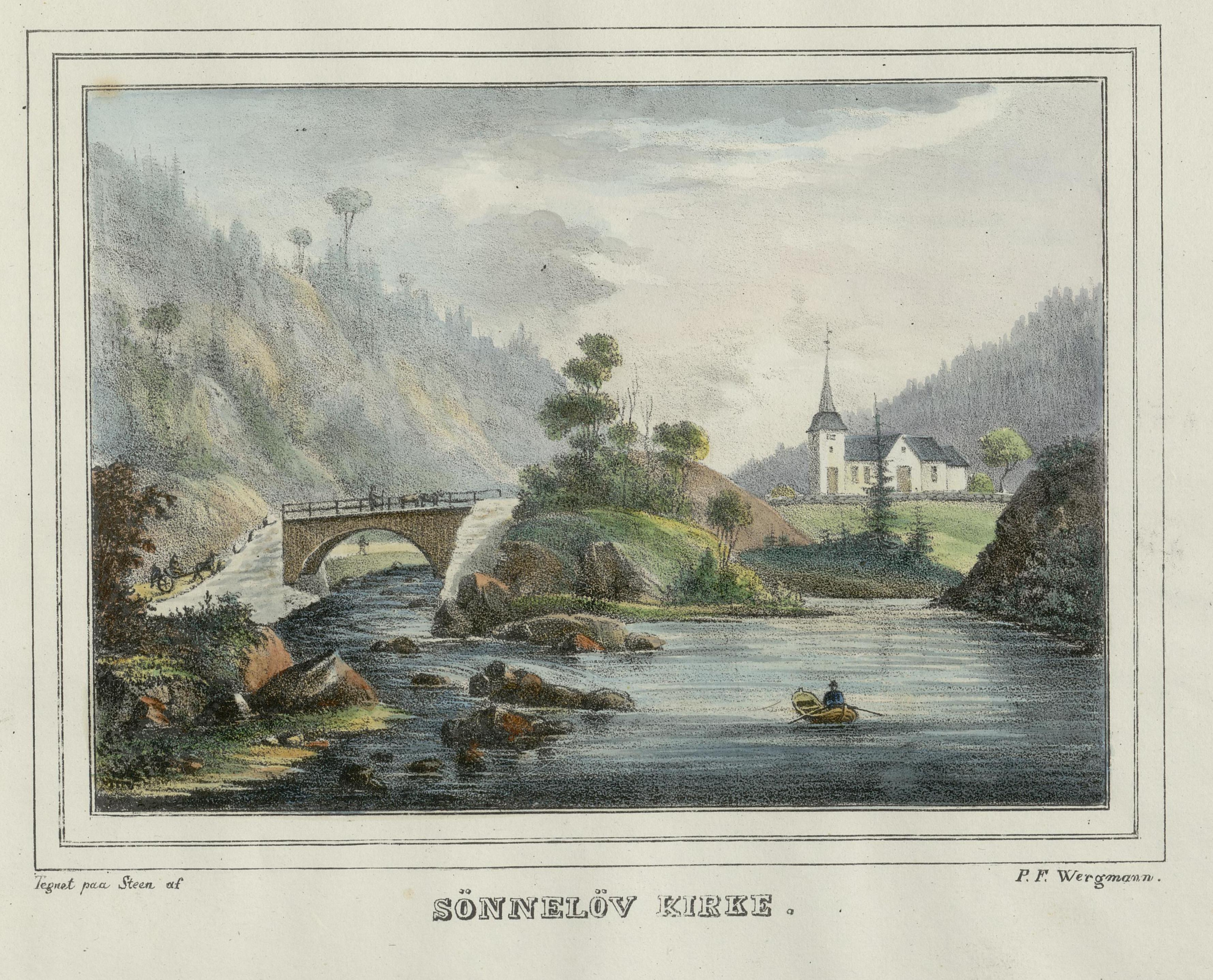
Historic painting of the church

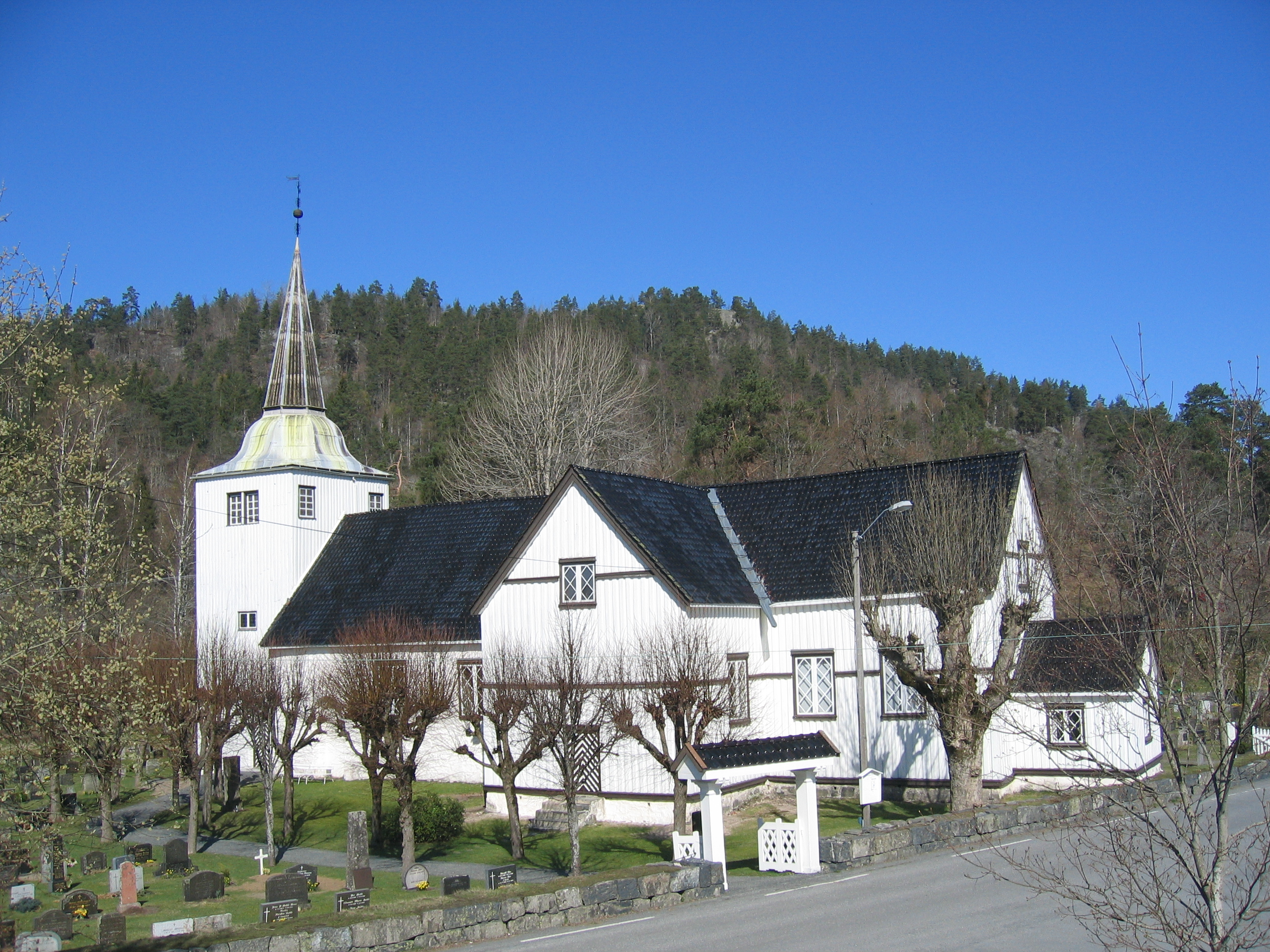
View of the exterior of the church

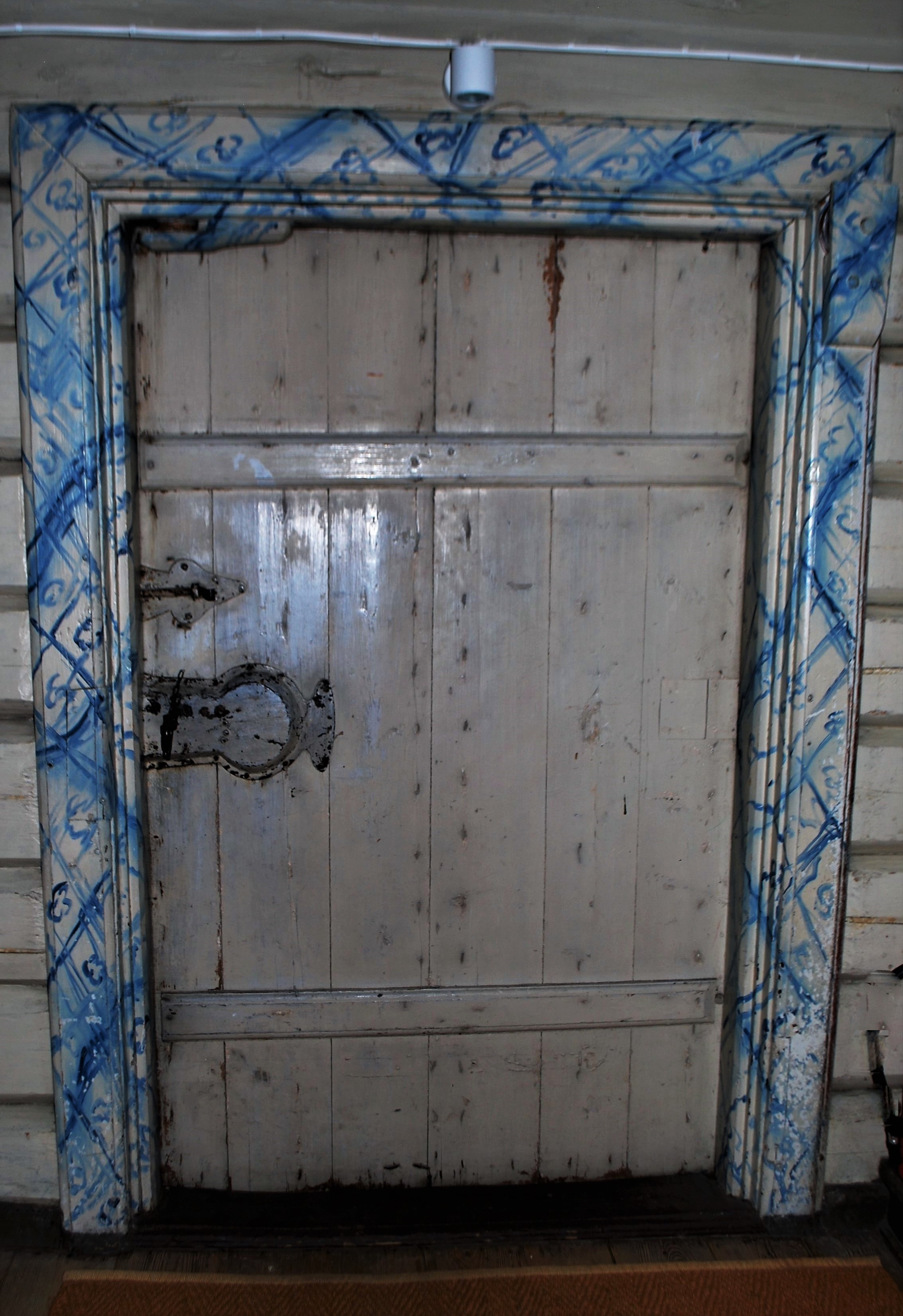
Søndeled Church

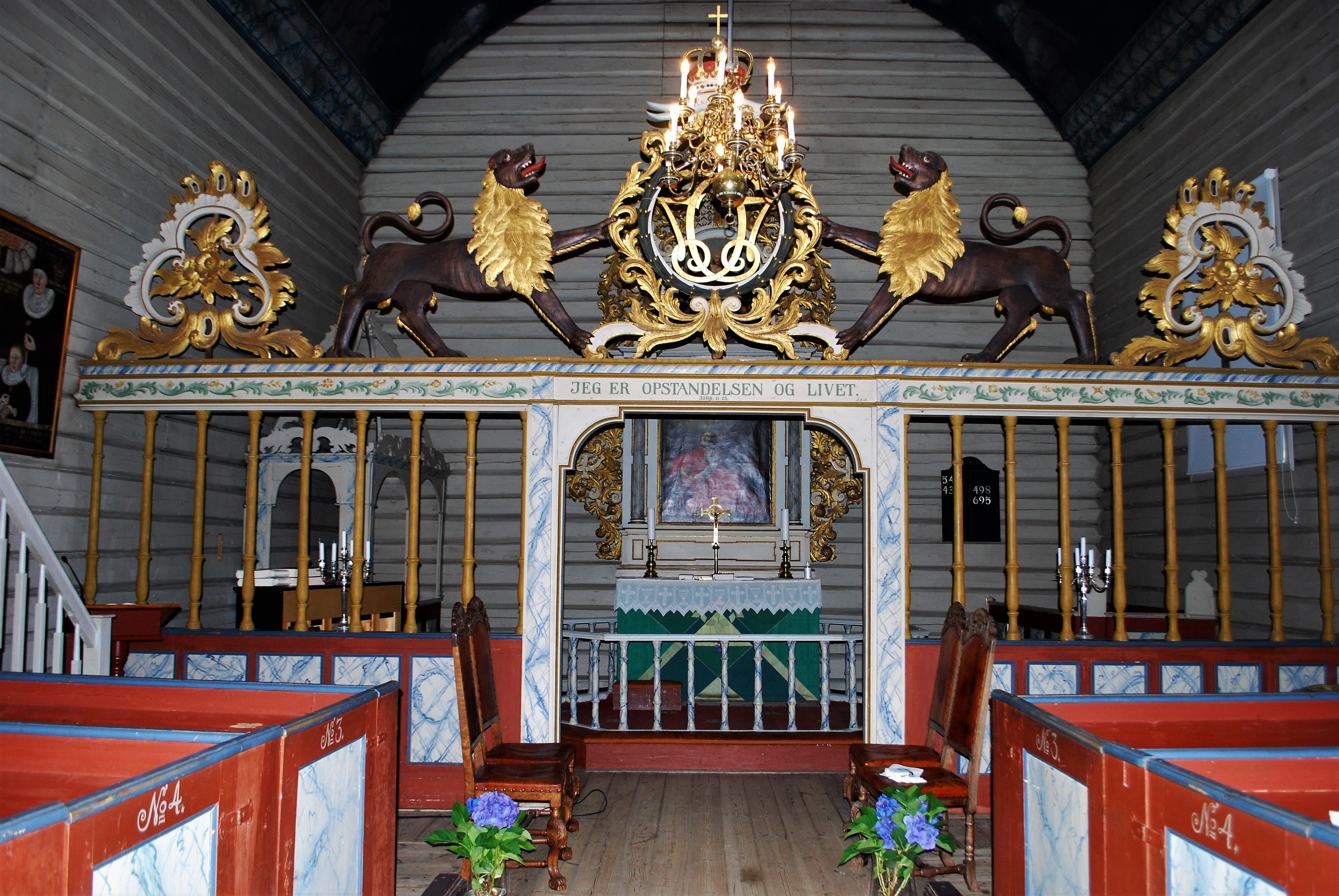
Søndeled Church

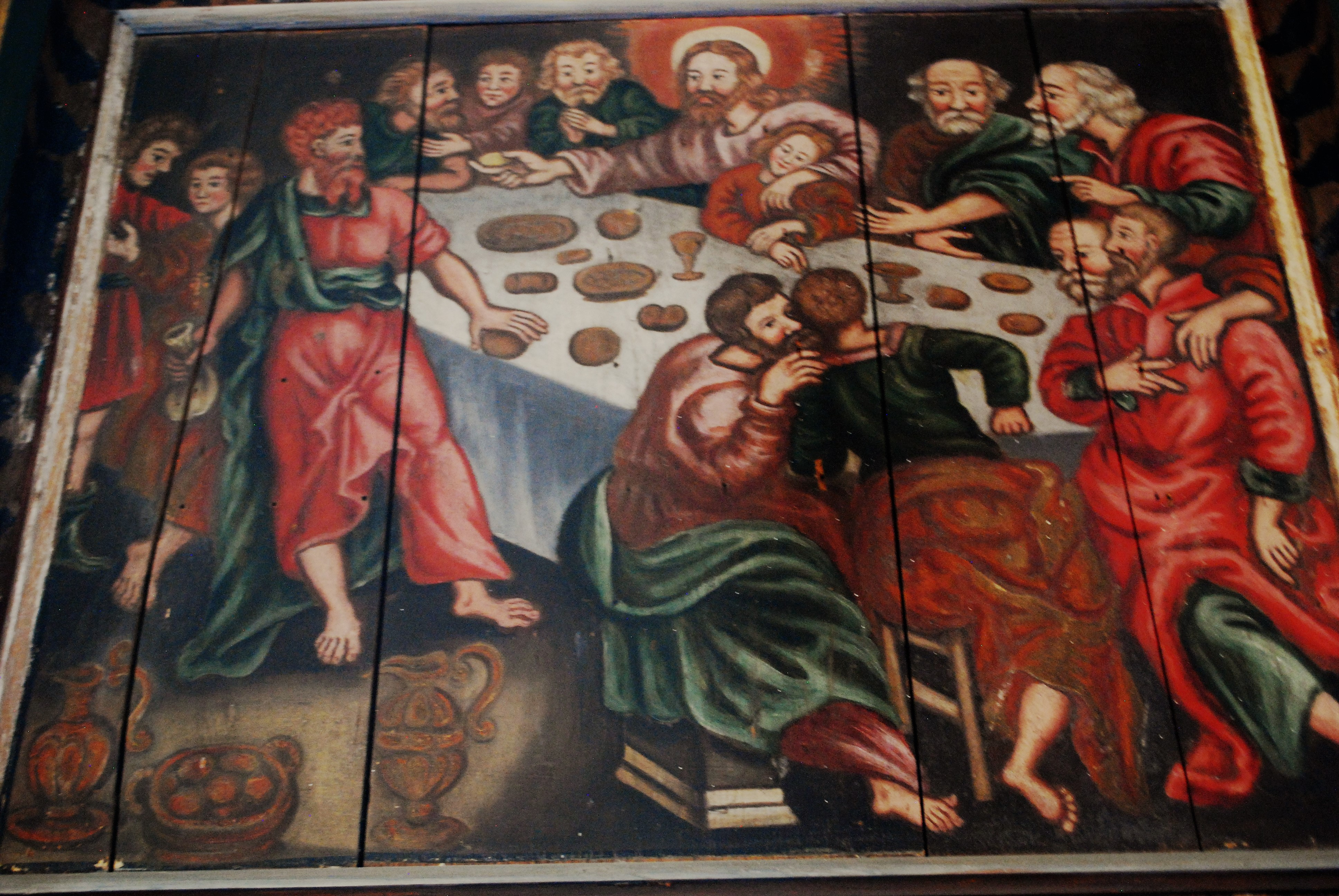
Søndeled Church

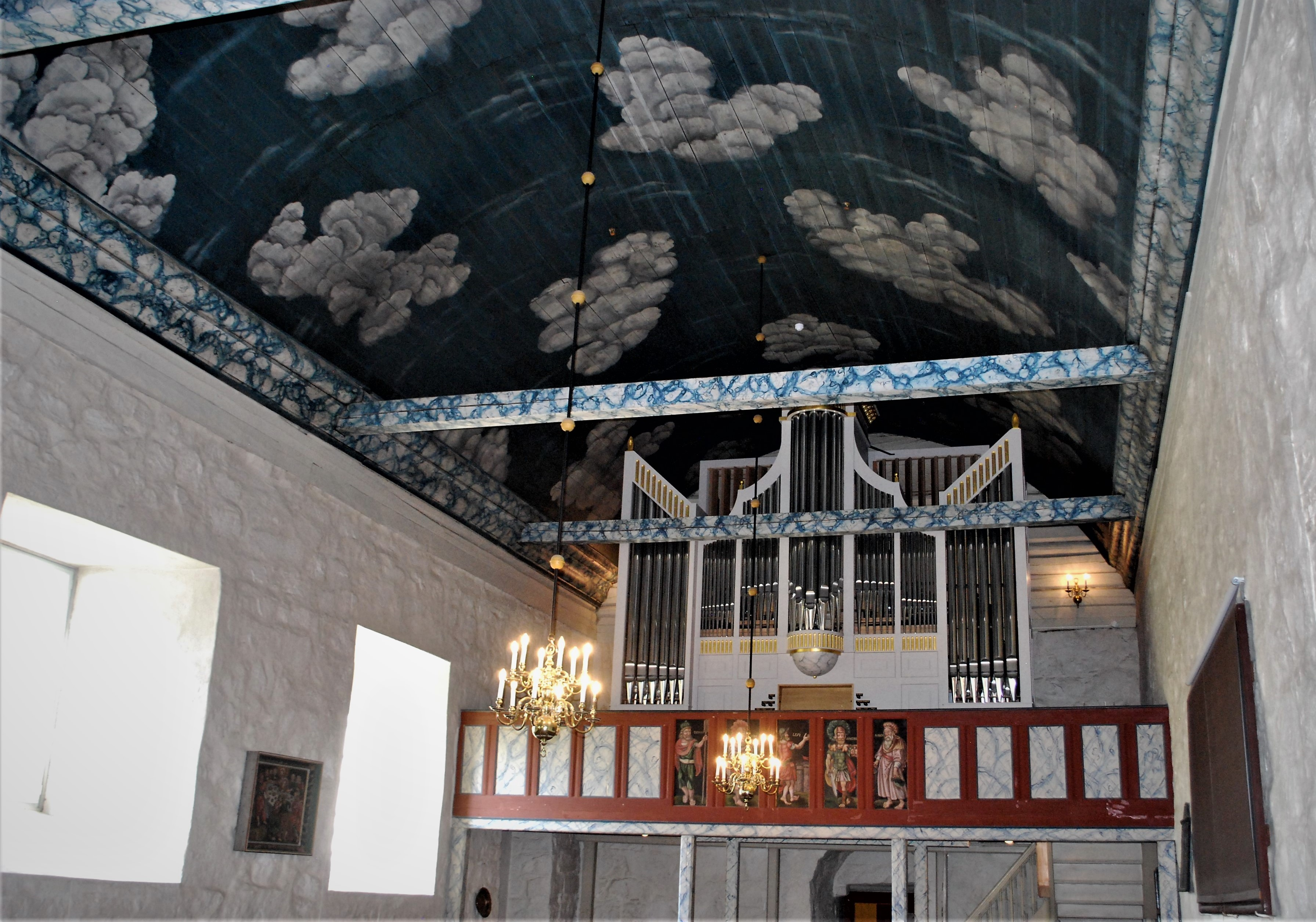
Søndeled Church

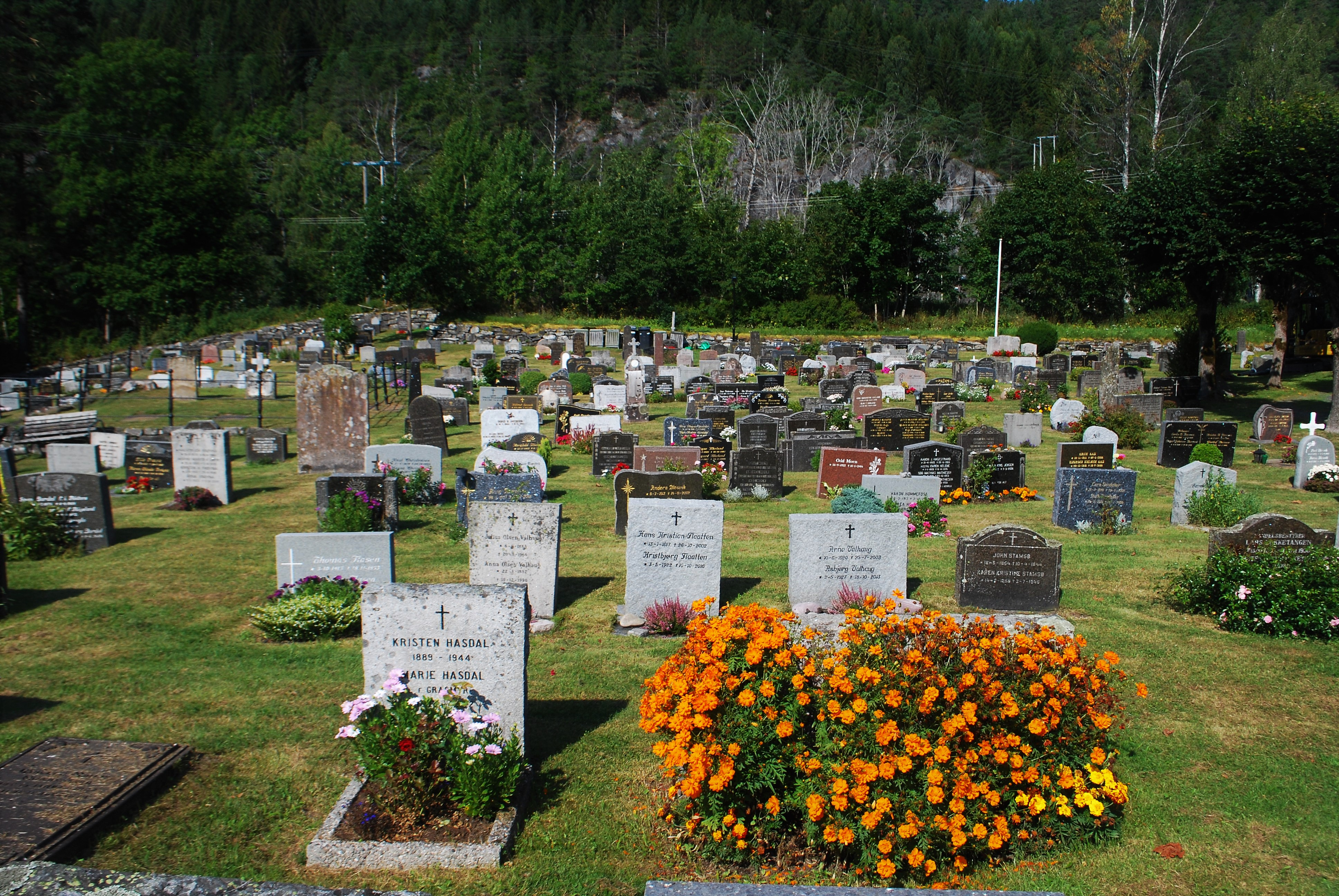
Søndeled Churchyard

== See also ==
- List of churches in Agder og Telemark
