= Søndeled (village) =

Village in Risør Municipality, Norway

- Village
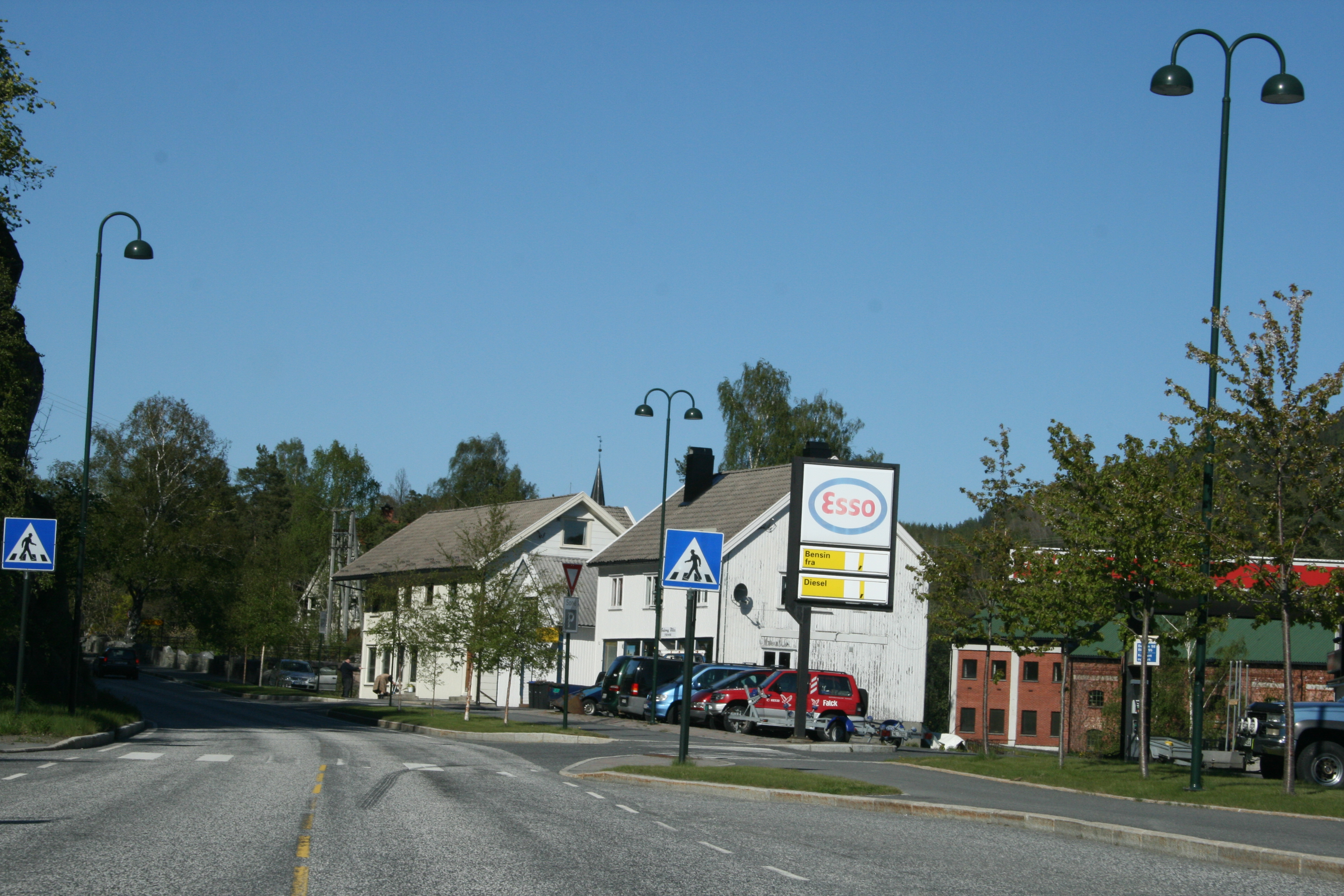
- View of a road through the village
- Interactive map of Søndeled
- Coordinates: 58.7609°N 09.0749°E
- Country: Norway
- Region: Southern Norway
- County: Agder
- District: Østre Agder
- Municipality: Risør Municipality
- Elevation: 12 m (39 ft)
- Time zone: UTC+01:00 (CET)
  - Summer (DST): UTC+02:00 (CEST)
- Post Code: 4990 Søndeled

Søndeled is a village in Risør Municipality in Agder county, Norway. The village is located at the western end of the Søndeledfjorden at the mouth of the river Brøbøvann. The villages of Fiane and Eikeland (both in Gjerstad Municipality) lie about 5 kilometres (3.1 mi) to the north, the village of Akland lies about 4.5 kilometres (2.8 mi) to the south, and the town of Risør is about 15 kilometres (9.3 mi) to the southeast. The Norwegian County Road 418 runs through the village, connecting to the European route E18 highway a short distance to the southwest. The village has a school, shops, and Søndeled Church.

== History ==
Historically, the village was the administrative centre of the old Søndeled Municipality which existed from 1838 until its dissolution in 1964. People from this area are called søndølingar.

=== Name ===
The village (and municipality) is named after the fjord that it sits along (Old Norse: Sundaleiðr, now called the Søndeledfjorden). The first element comes from the word sundene which means 'straits' and the last element is led (Old Norse: leið) which means 'path' or 'way'. Hence the name means the 'path between the straits'.

== Notable people ==
- Berge Helle Kringlebotn, a local politician
- Sigurd Marcussen, a local politician and trade union leader
