= Gjerstad =

Gjerstad may refer to:

== Places ==
=== Norway ===
- Gjerstad Municipality, a municipality in Agder county
- Gjerstad (village), the administrative centre of Gjerstad Municipality in Agder county
- Gjerstad Church, a church in Gjerstad Municipality in Agder county
- Gjerstad Station, a railway station on the Sørlandet Line located in Gjerstad Municipality in Agder county
- Gjerstad, Vestland, a village in Osterøy Municipality in Vestland county
- Gjerstad Church (Osterøy), a church in Osterøy Municipality in Vestland county
- Gjerstad, Nordland, a village in Hadsel Municipality in Nordland county

== People ==
- Einar Gjerstad (1897–1988), a Swedish archaeologist
- Frode Gjerstad (born 1948), a Norwegian Jazz musician
- Ingunn Gjerstad (born 1963), a Norwegian politician
- Joralf Gjerstad (1926–2021), a Norwegian healer
