= Sundebru =

Village in Gjerstad Municipality, Norway

- Village
- Interactive map of Sundebru
- Coordinates: 58.8382°N 09.0872°E
- Country: Norway
- Region: Southern Norway
- County: Agder
- District: Østre Agder
- Municipality: Gjerstad Municipality
- Elevation: 40 m (130 ft)
- Time zone: UTC+01:00 (CET)
  - Summer (DST): UTC+02:00 (CEST)
- Post Code: 4993 Sundebru

Sundebru is a village in Gjerstad Municipality in Agder county, Norway. The village is located on the west side of the southern end of the lake Gjerstadvatnet. The village lies north of the villages of Fiane and Eikeland, east of the village of Gryting, and west of the village of Østerholt. The village of Sundebru sits just north of the junction of Norwegian County Road 418, Norwegian County Road 417, and European route E18.
