= Akland =

Village in Risør Municipality, Norway

- Village
- Interactive map of Akland
- Coordinates: 58.7293°N 09.0415°E
- Country: Norway
- Region: Southern Norway
- County: Agder
- District: Østre Agder
- Municipality: Risør Municipality
- Elevation: 68 m (223 ft)
- Time zone: UTC+01:00 (CET)
  - Summer (DST): UTC+02:00 (CEST)
- Post Code: 4950 Risør

Akland is a village in Risør Municipality in Agder county, Norway. The village is located at the southwestern end of the Søndeledfjorden. It sits at the junction of the European route E18 highway, Norwegian County Road 416, and Norwegian County Road 418. The village of Moen lies about 2.5 kilometres (1.6 mi) to the east and the village of Søndeled lies about 4.5 kilometres (2.8 mi) to the north.
