= Rød, Gjerstad =

Village in Gjerstad Municipality, Norway

Rød
- Village
- Interactive map of Rød
- Coordinates: 58.8932°N 08.9935°E
- Country: Norway
- Region: Southern Norway
- County: Agder
- District: Østre Agder
- Municipality: Gjerstad Municipality
- Elevation: 110 m (360 ft)
- Time zone: UTC+01:00 (CET)
  - Summer (DST): UTC+02:00 (CEST)
- Post Code: 4980 Gjerstad

Rød is a village in Gjerstad Municipality in Agder county, Norway. The village is located along the Storelva river, about 2.5 kilometres (1.6 mi) north of the municipal centre of Gjerstad and about 6 kilometres (3.7 mi) northeast of the village of Vestøl.
