= Jan Olav Olsen =

Norwegian politician (born 1950)

Jan Olav Olsen (born 29 September 1950 in Arendal) is a Norwegian politician for the Conservative Party.

He was elected to the Norwegian Parliament from Aust-Agder in 2001, but was not re-elected in 2005.

Olsen held various positions on the municipal council of Gjerstad Municipality from 1983 to 1999, serving as mayor from 1991 until 1999. From 1999 to 2001 he was a member of Aust-Agder county council.

== See also ==
- Politics of Norway
- Inger Løite Member of same council, but from Labour Party
