= Gryting =

Village in Gjerstad Municipality, Norway

- Village
- Interactive map of Gryting
- Coordinates: 58.8298°N 09.0550°E
- Country: Norway
- Region: Southern Norway
- County: Agder
- District: Østre Agder
- Municipality: Gjerstad Municipality
- Elevation: 137 m (449 ft)
- Time zone: UTC+01:00 (CET)
  - Summer (DST): UTC+02:00 (CEST)
- Post Code: 4993 Sundebru

Gryting is a small village in Gjerstad Municipality in Agder county, Norway. The village is located along the Norwegian County Road 417 and the Sørlandsbanen railway line. The village of Sundebru lies about 3 kilometres (1.9 mi) to the east of Gryting.
