= Fiane =

Fiane may refer to:

== Places ==
- Fiane, Gjerstad, a village in Gjerstad municipality in Aust-Agder county, Norway
- Fiane, Tvedestrand, a village in Tvedestrand municipality in Aust-Agder county, Norway
