= Moen, Agder =

Village in Risør Municipality, Norway

Moen
- Village
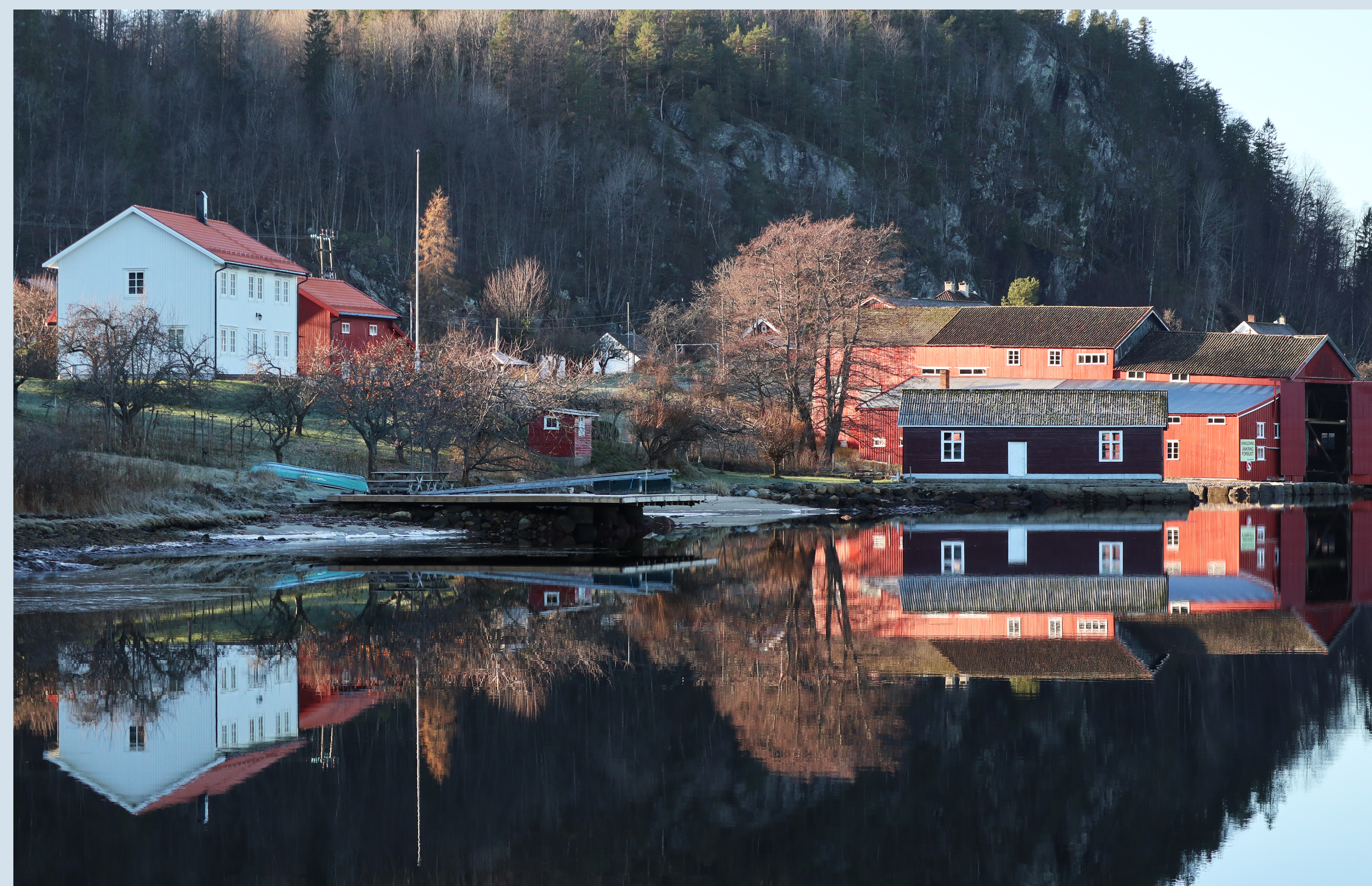
- View of stalls at the shipyard - boatbuilding at Moen in Risør, 2018
- Interactive map of Moen
- Coordinates: 58.7232°N 09.0733°E
- Country: Norway
- Region: Southern Norway
- County: Agder
- District: Østre Agder
- Municipality: Risør Municipality

Area
  - Total: 0.27 km^{2} (0.10 sq mi)
- Elevation: 39 m (128 ft)

Population (2025)
  - Total: 212
  - Density: 785/km^{2} (2,030/sq mi)
- Time zone: UTC+01:00 (CET)
  - Summer (DST): UTC+02:00 (CEST)
- Post Code: 4950 Risør

Moen is a village in Risør Municipality in Agder county, Norway. The village is located along the southern shore of the Søndeledfjorden, about 2.5 kilometres (1.6 mi) east of the village of Bossvika and about the same distance west of the village of Akland. The Norwegian County Road 416 runs through the village.

The 0.27-square-kilometre (67-acre) village has a population (2025) of 212 and a population density of 785 inhabitants per square kilometre (2,030/sq mi).
