= Ausland, Norway =

Village in Gjerstad Municipality, Norway

Ausland
- Village
- Interactive map of Ausland
- Coordinates: 58.8891°N 09.0439°E
- Country: Norway
- Region: Southern Norway
- County: Agder
- District: Østre Agder
- Municipality: Gjerstad Municipality
- Elevation: 104 m (341 ft)
- Time zone: UTC+01:00 (CET)
  - Summer (DST): UTC+02:00 (CEST)
- Post Code: 4980 Gjerstad

Ausland is a small farming village in Gjerstad Municipality in Agder county, Norway. The village is located along the river Auslandselva, about 2 kilometres (1.2 mi) west of the village of Gjerstad. The Sørlandsbanen railway line passes just south of the village area.
