= Vestøl =

Vestøl may refer to:

== People ==
- Aage Vestøl (1922–2008), a Norwegian chess player
- Bjørnar Vestøl (born 1974), a Norwegian cyclist
- Harald Vestøl (born 1945), a Norwegian politician

== Places ==
- Vestøl, Agder, a village in Gjerstad Municipality in Agder county, Norway
- Vestøl, Birkenes, a farm area in Birkenes Municipality in Agder county, Norway
