= Bossvika =

Village in Risør Municipality, Norway

- Village
- Interactive map of Bossvika
- Coordinates: 58.7185°N 09.1046°E
- Country: Norway
- Region: Southern Norway
- County: Agder
- District: Østre Agder
- Municipality: Risør Municipality
- Elevation: 26 m (85 ft)
- Time zone: UTC+01:00 (CET)
  - Summer (DST): UTC+02:00 (CEST)
- Post Code: 4950 Risør

Bossvika is a village in Risør Municipality in Agder county, Norway. The village is located along the southern shore of the Søndeledfjorden. The village lies at the junction of the Norwegian County Road 416 and the Norwegian County Road 411, about 8 kilometres (5.0 mi) west of the town of Risør, and about 2.5 kilometres (1.6 mi) east of the village of Moen.
