= Vestøl, Agder =

Village in Gjerstad Municipality, Norway

Vestøl
- Village
- Interactive map of Vestøl
- Coordinates: 58.8608°N 08.9218°E
- Country: Norway
- Region: Southern Norway
- County: Agder
- District: Østre Agder
- Municipality: Gjerstad Municipality
- Elevation: 279 m (915 ft)
- Time zone: UTC+01:00 (CET)
  - Summer (DST): UTC+02:00 (CEST)
- Post Code: 4980 Gjerstad

Vestøl is a village in Gjerstad Municipality in Agder county, Norway. The village is located in the rural uplands of the municipality, about 10 kilometres (6.2 mi) west of the municipal centre of Gjerstad. There is only one road leading to Vestøl, known as the Vestølveien road which starts at Rød and runs past the Åsbø farm area.
