= Gjerstad Station =

Railway station in Gjerstad, Norway

Gjerstad
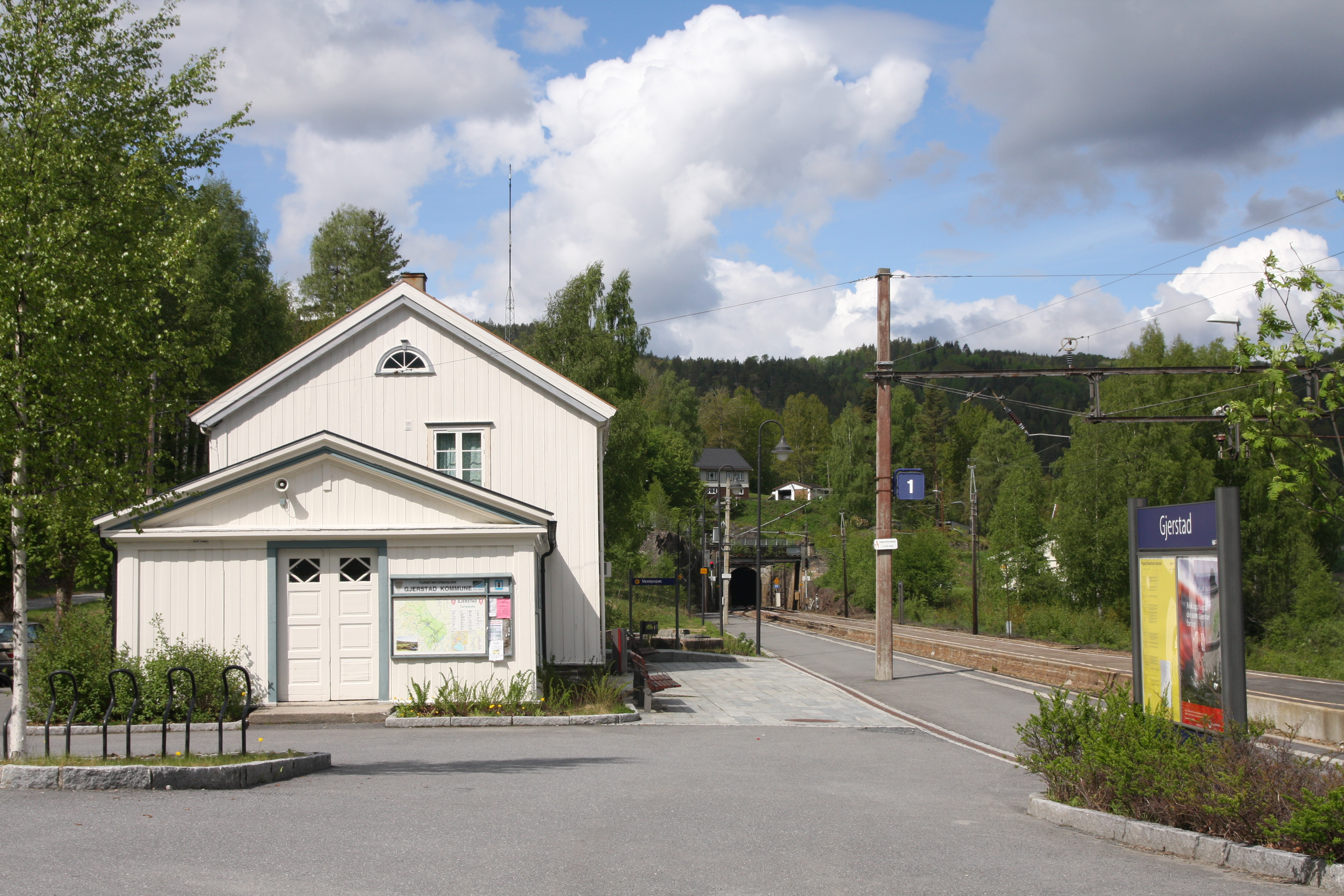

General information
- Location: Gjerstad, Gjerstad Municipality; Norway
- Coordinates: 58°52′12″N 09°01′23″E
- Elevation: 36.6 m (120 ft)
- System: Railway station
- Owner: Bane NOR
- Operator: Go-Ahead Norge
- Line: Sørlandsbanen
- Distance: 237.05 km (147.30 mi)
- Platforms: 2
- Connections: Bus: Tvedestrand, Risør

Construction
- Parking: 25

Other information
- Station code: GJE

History
- Opened: 10 November 1935
Location

Gjerstad Station (Norwegian: Gjerstad stasjon) is a railway station located in the village of Gjerstad in Gjerstad Municipality in Agder county, Norway. The station sits along the Sørlandsbanen railway line and it is served by express trains to Kristiansand and Oslo. The small station has a waiting room, parking for up to 25 cars, and bus and taxi connections to the surrounding area.

== History ==
The station was opened in 1935 when the Sørlandet Line was extended from Neslandsvatn Station to Arendal Station.

Preceding station	Express trains	Following station
Vegårshei towards Stavanger	F5	Neslandsvatn towards Oslo S
