= Torbjørn Urfjell =

Norwegian politician

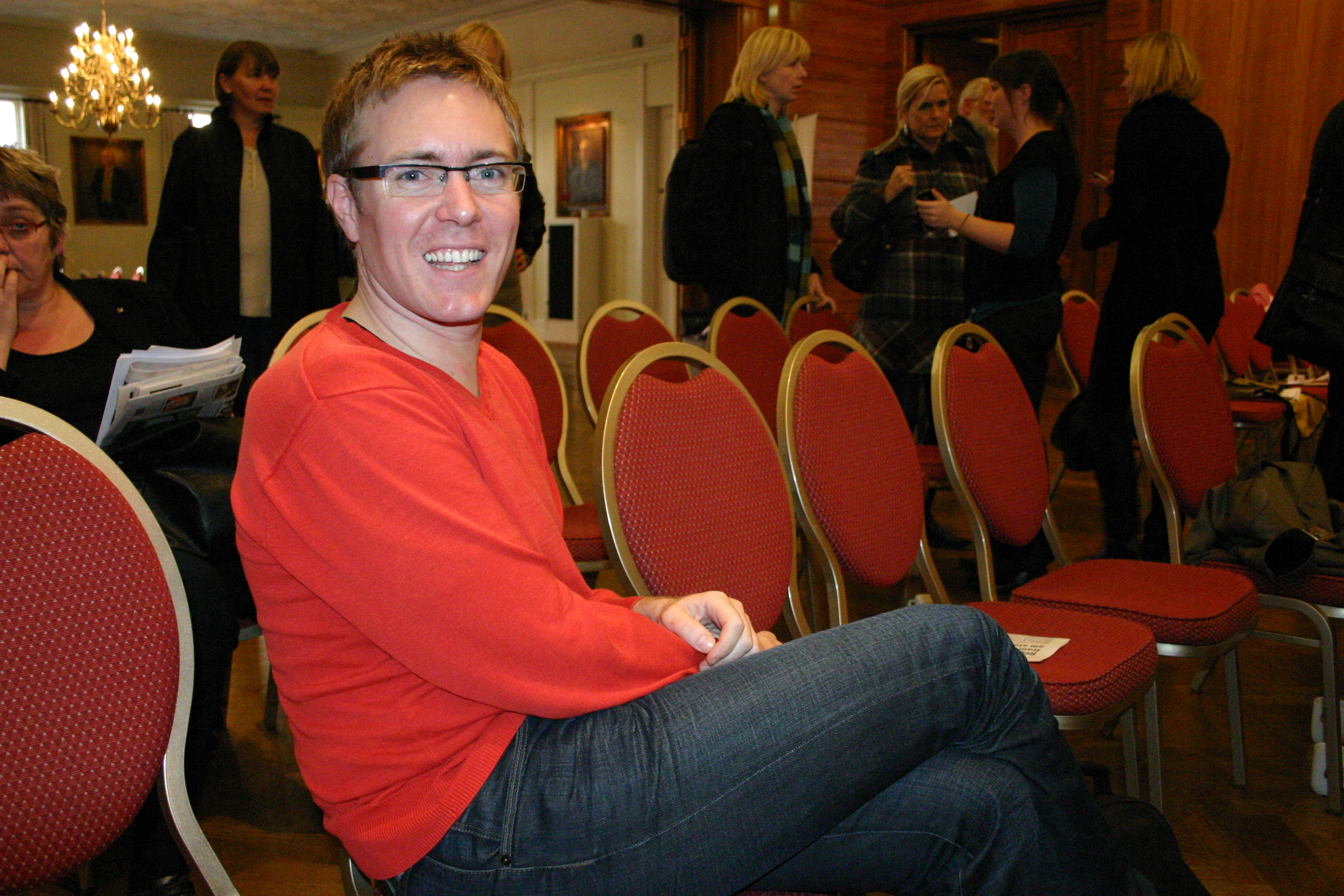
Torbjørn Urfjell

Torbjørn Urfjell (born 3 November 1977) is a Norwegian politician for the Socialist Left Party.

Hailing from Gjerstad Municipality, Urfjell took his secondary education in Risør and Vågsbygd, finishing in 1996. He became county leader in Socialist Youth in 1994, and remained a central board member until 2000. He served compulsory civilian national service instead of compulsory military service, and in 1998 he was selected as the nationwide spokesperson for the civilian national servicemen.

From 1999 to 2005, he was a member of the executive committee of the municipal council of Kristiansand Municipality. From 1999 to 2003 he was also a member of Vest-Agder county council, having been a deputy member from 1995 to 1999. In 2005, Urfjell was a candidate for the Parliament of Norway, but was not elected. However, Urfjell served as a political advisor in the Ministry of Foreign Affairs from 2005 to 2007, during Stoltenberg's Second Cabinet. In 2008, he was chosen as leader of the party chapter in rural Gjerstad.

Urfjell has been a national board member of the Norwegian National Association for Lesbian and Gay Liberation. In Kristiansand he has been selected for several cultural positions, including chair of Kristiansand Symphony Orchestra and deputy board member of Kilden Performing Arts Centre. In 2012, he was appointed as chair of Fond for lyd og bilde, and also became communications director of the United Nations Association of Norway.
