= Gjerstadvatnet =

Lake in Agder, Norway

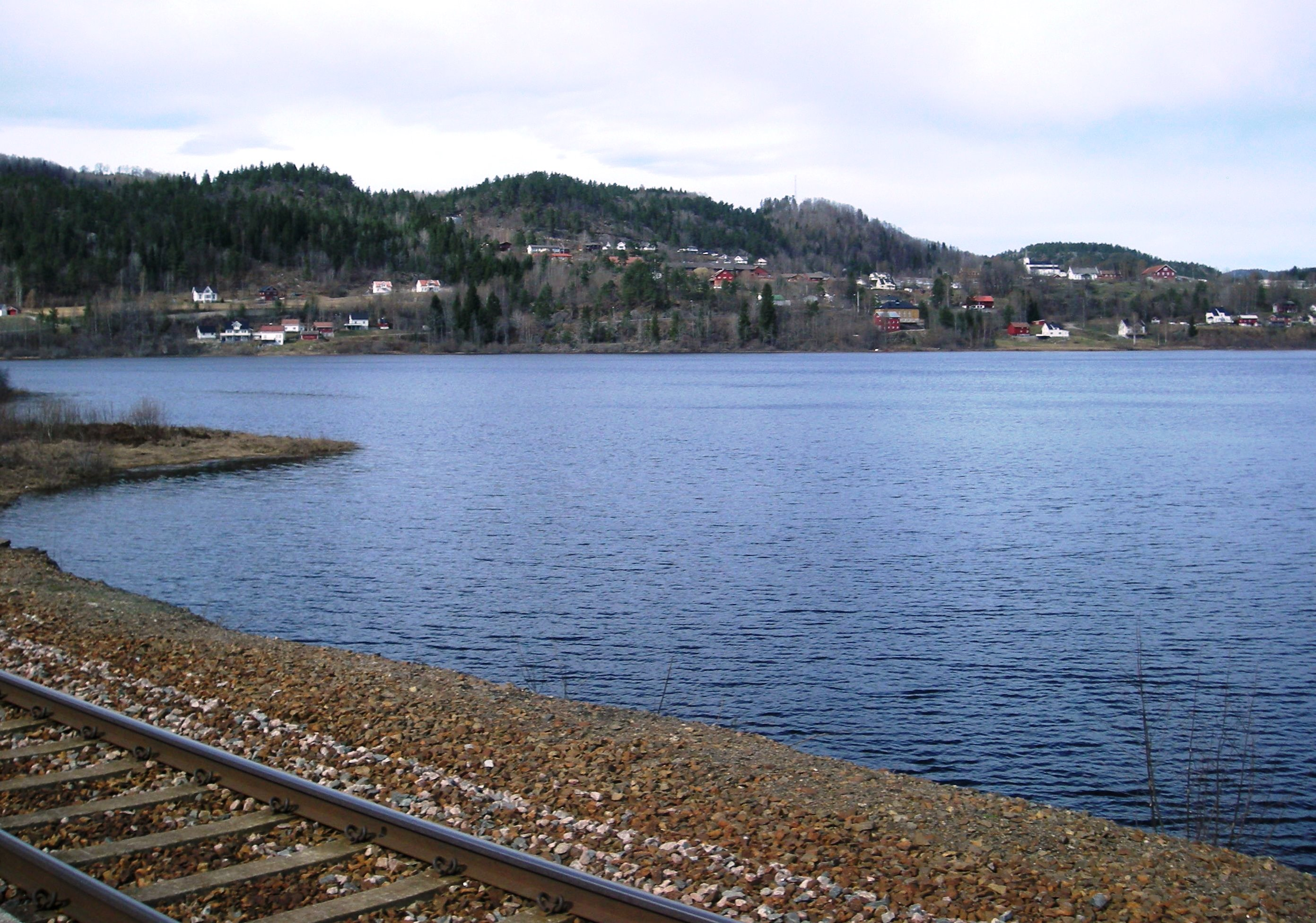
- View of the lake
- Interactive map of Gjerstadvatnet
- Location: Gjerstad Municipality, Agder
- Coordinates: 58.86151°N 9.05379°E
- Catchment area: 304.26 square kilometres (117.48 sq mi)
- Basin countries: Norway
- Max. length: 5.2 kilometres (3.2 mi)
- Max. width: 1 kilometre (0.62 mi)
- Surface area: 1.39 km^{2} (0.54 sq mi)
- Surface elevation: 31 metres (102 ft)
- References: NVE

Gjerstadvatnet is a lake in Gjerstad Municipality in Agder county, Norway. The 1.39-square-kilometre (0.54 sq mi) lake is 5.2 kilometres (3.2 mi) long. The long narrow lake ranges from 34 metres (112 ft) wide at Neset to about 1 kilometre (0.62 mi) wide at the northwest end of the lake. The village of Gjerstad lies at the northwestern end of the lake and the village of Østerholt is located at the southeastern end of the lake. Norwegian County Road 418 runs along the south side of the lake.

== See also ==
- List of lakes in Norway
