= Svenum Jensen Vævestad =

Norwegian farmer and politician (1849–1898)

Svenum Jensen Vævestad (6 April 1849 – 21 June 1898) was a Norwegian farmer and politician for the Liberal Party.

Vævestad was born and raised on Vevestad, a family farm in Gjerstad Municipality in Nedenes county, Norway. He was a member of the municipal council for Gjerstad Municipality (1882-1897) and was council treasurer (1893-1897). He was elected to the Norwegian Parliament in 1897, representing the constituency of Nedenes Amt. He served one term.
