= Eikeland =

Village in Gjerstad Municipality, Norway

- Village
- Interactive map of Eikeland
- Coordinates: 58.8021°N 09.0962°E
- Country: Norway
- Region: Southern Norway
- County: Agder
- District: Østre Agder
- Municipality: Gjerstad Municipality

Area
  - Total: 0.92 km^{2} (0.36 sq mi)
- Elevation: 42 m (138 ft)

Population (2025)
  - Total: 684
  - Density: 743/km^{2} (1,920/sq mi)
- Time zone: UTC+01:00 (CET)
  - Summer (DST): UTC+02:00 (CEST)
- Post Code: 4993 Sundebru

Eikeland is a village in southeastern part of Gjerstad Municipality in Agder, Norway. It is located about 15 kilometres (9.3 mi) southeast of the municipal center of Gjerstad and about 5 kilometres (3.1 mi) north of the village of Søndeled. The Norwegian County Road 418 runs through the village.

The 0.92-square-kilometre (230-acre) village has a population (2025) of 684 and a population density of 743 inhabitants per square kilometre (1,920/sq mi).

The village area was originally centered on the old Eikeland ironworks factory along the river, but has since spread out to the east and the urban area of Eikeland now includes the neighboring village of Fiane. The European Route E18 highway can be reached about 2 kilometres (1.2 mi) to the north of Eikeland.
