= Nybø =

Nybø is a surname. Notable people with the surname include:

- Håvard Nybø (born 1983), Norwegian racing cyclist
- Iselin Nybø (born 1981), Norwegian politician
- Olga Nybø (born 1930), Norwegian politician
- Sverre Bernhard Nybø (1903–1976), Norwegian politician
