= Østerholt =

Village in Gjerstad Municipality, Norway

- Village
- Interactive map of Østerholt
- Coordinates: 58.8459°N 09.1074°E
- Country: Norway
- Region: Southern Norway
- County: Agder
- District: Østre Agder
- Municipality: Gjerstad Municipality
- Elevation: 54 m (177 ft)
- Time zone: UTC+01:00 (CET)
  - Summer (DST): UTC+02:00 (CEST)
- Post Code: 4993 Sundebru

Østerholt is a village in Gjerstad Municipality in Agder county, Norway. The village is located along the European route E18 highway, just northeast of the village of Sundebru.
