= Fiane, Gjerstad =

Village in Gjerstad Municipality, Norway

Fiane
- Village
- Interactive map of Fiane
- Coordinates: 58.8050°N 09.0779°E
- Country: Norway
- Region: Southern Norway
- County: Agder
- District: Østre Agder
- Municipality: Gjerstad Municipality
- Elevation: 74 m (243 ft)
- Time zone: UTC+01:00 (CET)
  - Summer (DST): UTC+02:00 (CEST)
- Post Code: 4993 Sundebru

Fiane is a village in Gjerstad Municipality in Agder county, Norway. The village is located along the Norwegian County Road 418, just east of the European route E18 highway. The Fiane area is part of the Eikeland urban area, which has nearly 700 residents (2025). One of the schools for Gjerstad Municipality is located in Fiane.
