= Norwegian County Road 418 =

Road in Agder county, Norway

Coordinates: 58.73741°N 09.04239°E

County Road 418
- Bokmål: Fylkesvei 418; Nynorsk: Fylkesveg 418

Route information
- Maintained by Norwegian Public Roads Administration
- Length: 20 km (12 mi)

Major junctions
- North end: Fv71 Egddalen, Gjerstad Municipality
- South end: Fv416 Aspelund, Risør Municipality

Location
- Country: Norway

Highway system
- Roads in Norway; National Roads; County Roads
← Fv417	→ Fv419

Norwegian county road 418 (Fv418) is a Norwegian county road in Agder county, Norway. The 20-kilometre (12 mi) long road runs between the junction of Norwegian County Road 416 at the Aspelund farm in Risør Municipality and the junction with Norwegian County Road 71 at Egddalen in the village of Gjerstad in Gjerstad Municipality. A large portion of the road follows the southern shore of the lake Gjerstadvatnet. The route from Aspelund to Sundebru used to be part of the European route E18 highway.

== Municipalities and junctions ==
=== Aust-Agder county ===
Risør Municipality

Fv416 Aspelund
Fv4 from Vormli to Kvernvik (1.1 km)
Fv5 from Søndeled to Hasåsmyr
Rv351 Søndeled

Gjerstad Municipality

Fv78 from Fiane to Eikeland (2.4 km)
Fv77 from Fiane to Brokeland (0.5 km)
E18 Nybø
Fv417 Sundebru
E18 Sundebru
Fv76 to the county border at Høgstli → Kragerø
Fv71 from Egddalen to the county border at Øygarden → Fv515 (Telemark) to Øy in Åmli Municipality
