= Søren Georg Abel =

Norwegian priest and politician

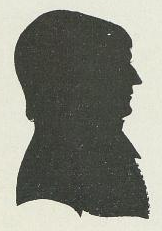
- A Silhouette portrait of Abel

Member of the Norwegian Parliament
- In office 1814–1814
- Constituency: Nedenæs Amt
- In office 1818–1818
- Constituency: Nedenæs Amt

Personal details
- Born: January 3, 1772 Mo, Telemark, Norway
- Died: May 5, 1820 (aged 48)
- Occupation: Priest, Politician
- Known for: Father of mathematician Niels Henrik Abel

Søren Georg Abel (3 January 1772 – 5 May 1820) was a Norwegian priest and politician, also known as the father of mathematician Niels Henrik Abel.

== Personal life ==
Søren Georg Abel was born on 3 January 1772 in Mo, Telemark as the son of Hans Mathias Abel (1738–1803) and Elisabeth Knuth Normann (1737–1817).

In 25 March 1800, he married Anne Marie Simonsen. Their second oldest son was Niels Henrik Abel (1802-1829), the world-famous mathematician. Søren Georg Abel was also a great-grandfather of the politician Hans Prydz (1868–1957).

== Career ==
Søren Georg Abel enrolled as a student of Lutheran theology in 1788 and graduated as cand.theol. in 1792. In 1794 he was hired as chaplain under his father, who was vicar in Gierestad og Wegaardsheien parish. As Abel maintained ties with Peder Hansen, bishop of Agder, Hansen suggested that Abel be appointed vicar in Bygland in 1798. This never materialized, but Abel was appointed vicar at Hesby Church on Findøe the next year. Regarding this position as a stepping stone, in 1801 Abel unsuccessfully applied for the vicarships in Sigdal, Holle and Aas. He remained in Findøe, and Niels Henrik Abel was born there in 1802.

In 1803 his father, the vicar, died. Abel applied for the vacant vicarship in Gierestad. Following a testimonial from Bishop Hansen and County Governor Koren, he was appointed. He later applied for ten other vicarships, but was not appointed and remained in Gierestad. In 1806 he published Religions-spørgsmaal med Svar, indrettede efter de unges Fatte-evne, a well-known explanation of Luther's Small Catechism.

In 1814 he was elected to the first session of the Norwegian Parliament, representing the rural constituency Nedenæs Amt (today named Aust-Agder). He was not re-elected in 1815, but returned in 1818 to serve a final term.

He died on 5 May 1820.
