= Inger Løite =

Norwegian politician (born 1958)

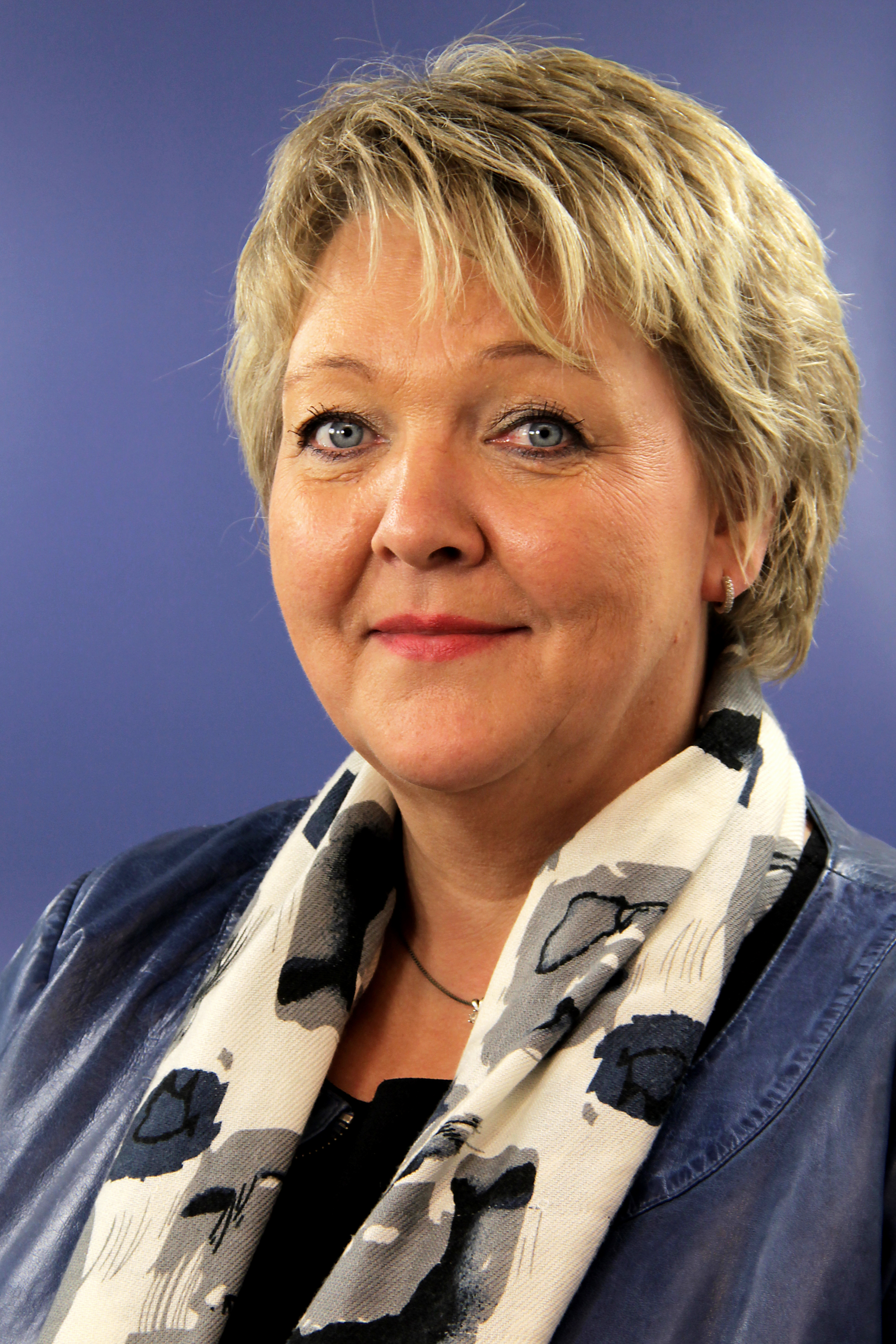
Inger Løite

Inger Haldis Løite (born 27 October 1958 in Gjerstad Municipality) is a Norwegian politician for the Labour Party.

She was elected to the Norwegian Parliament from Aust-Agder in 2005. On the local level she was a member of municipal council of Gjerstad Municipality from 1999 to 2007.

Outside politics, she has worked for Telenor for the majority of her professional career and has been active in the labour union LO. She does not have higher education.
