= Gjerstad Church =

Church in Agder, Norway

- Gjerstad kirke
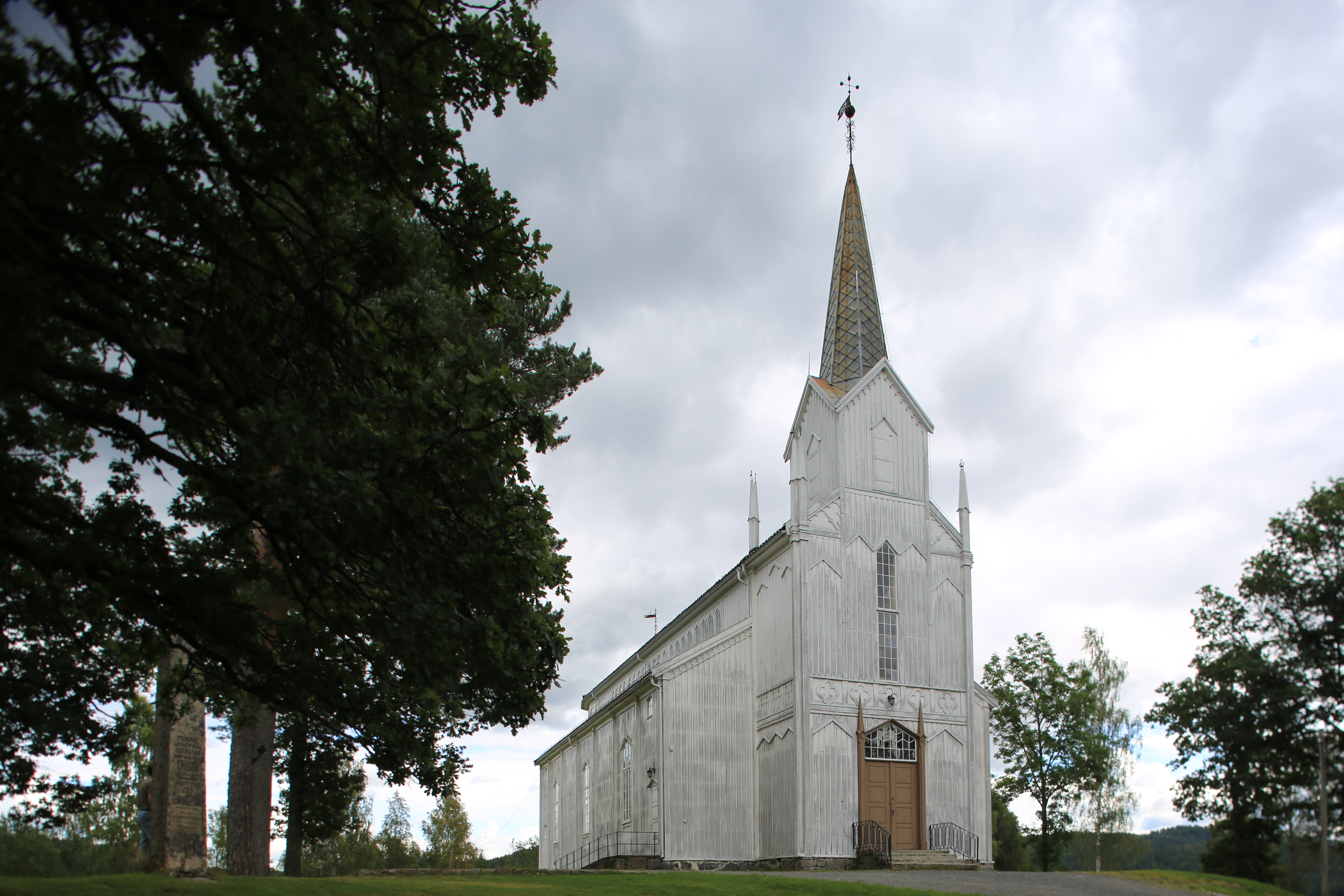
- View of the church
- Gjerstad Church
- 58.8829°N 09.0201°E
- Location: Gjerstad Municipality, Agder
- Country: Norway
- Denomination: Church of Norway
- Previous denomination: Catholic Church
- Churchmanship: Evangelical Lutheran

History
- Status: Parish church
- Founded: 14th century
- Consecrated: 23 Jan 1848

Architecture
- Functional status: Active
- Architect(s): Christian H. Grosch and Lars Listøl
- Architectural type: Long church
- Completed: 1848 (178 years ago)

Specifications
- Capacity: 500
- Materials: Wood

Administration
- Diocese: Agder og Telemark
- Deanery: Aust-Nedenes prosti
- Parish: Gjerstad
- Norwegian Cultural Heritage Site
- Type: Church
- Status: Automatically protected
- ID: 84256

Gjerstad Church (Norwegian: Gjerstad kirke, locally: Gjerstad kjørke) is a parish church of the Church of Norway in Gjerstad Municipality in Agder county, Norway. It is located in the village of Gjerstad. It is the church for the Gjerstad parish which is part of the Aust-Nedenes prosti (deanery) in the Diocese of Agder og Telemark. The white, wooden church was built in a long church design in 1848 by Lars Listøl using plans by the architect Christian H. Grosch. The church seats about 500 people.

== History ==
The earliest existing historical records of the church date back to the year 1400 (Gerikstadir Kirkje), but the church was likely founded around the year 1300. The first church was a stave church located about 90 metres (300 ft) to the southeast of the present location. Historically, the parish of Gjerstad included the nearby areas of Vegårshei and Søndeled (which also included Risør. The parish was based in Søndeled from the 1100s until the 1400s when the headquarters of the parish was moved to Gjerstad. In 1737, the old church was torn down and a new church was constructed on the same site. The new long church measured about 31 by 9.5 metres (102 ft × 31 ft). The builder of the new church was Søren Knutsen from Arendal. In 1745, the areas of Søndeled and Risør were separated to form their own parish. During the 1760s, several repairs were carried out on the building, including work on the bell tower.

In 1814, this church served as an election church (Norwegian: valgkirke). Together with more than 300 other parish churches across Norway, it was a polling station for elections to the 1814 Norwegian Constituent Assembly which wrote the Constitution of Norway. This was Norway's first national elections. Each church parish was a constituency that elected people called "electors" who later met together in each county to elect the representatives for the assembly that was to meet at Eidsvoll Manor later that year.

By the mid-1800s, the municipal council looked at the fact that there were over 2000 residents in the parish and seats for only 389 people in the church, so it was far too small. They wanted to nearby double the size of the church, so after standing for nearly 150 years, plans were begun to replace the building. Site work began in 1842, and construction on the building began in 1844. The new church was constructed at the top of the nearby hill, about 90 metres (300 ft) to the north-northwest of the site of the old church. The new church was consecrated on 23 January 1848 by the Bishop Jacob von der Lippe and it wasn't put into regular use until mid-1849. The old church was used until the summer of 1849 when it was torn down and its material was sold. The cemetery south of the present church is where the old church was located.

In 2004, the church was renovated and restored to its original look.

== Priests ==
There have been many priests who served at this church over the years. This is a partial list.

- Axel Pedersen (around 1552)
- Gude Pedersen (around 1561)
- Laurs (unknown dates)
- Peder Jensen Holt (1578-1607)
- Erik Olsen (unknown dates)
- Lauritz Nilsen (1614-1620)
- Erik Fredriksen Lindland (1621-1657)
- Bent Pedersen Amdal (1657-1695)
- Hans Pedersen Høllen (1695-1708)
- Hans Lauritzen Scavenius (1709-1716)
- Peder Olsen Horster (1716-1745)
- Johan Joakim Markmann (1745-1750)
- Lars Larsen Eskildsen (1750-1784)
- Hans Mathias Abel (1784-1803)
- Søren Georg Abel (1803-1821)
- John Aas (1821-1867)
- Lortenz Ditlev Krog (1867-1872)
- Jørgen Christian Andreas Grøner (1873-1890)
- Georg Pharo (1890-1899)
- Knud Christian Jarl Møller (1899-1910)
- Ragnvald Cornelius Knudsen (1910-1912)
- Henrik Lehmann (1913-1930)
- Ivar Glette (1930-1952)
- Gunnar Bjarne Gundersen (1953-1959)
- Karl Trygve Lehne (1959-1968)
- Arne Johan Sørensen (1969-1974)
- Ravn Madland (1975-1980)
- Gerhard Falk Woie (1981-1993)
- Nils Peder Kjetså (1993-??)
- Olav Hofsli (dates unknown)

== Media gallery ==
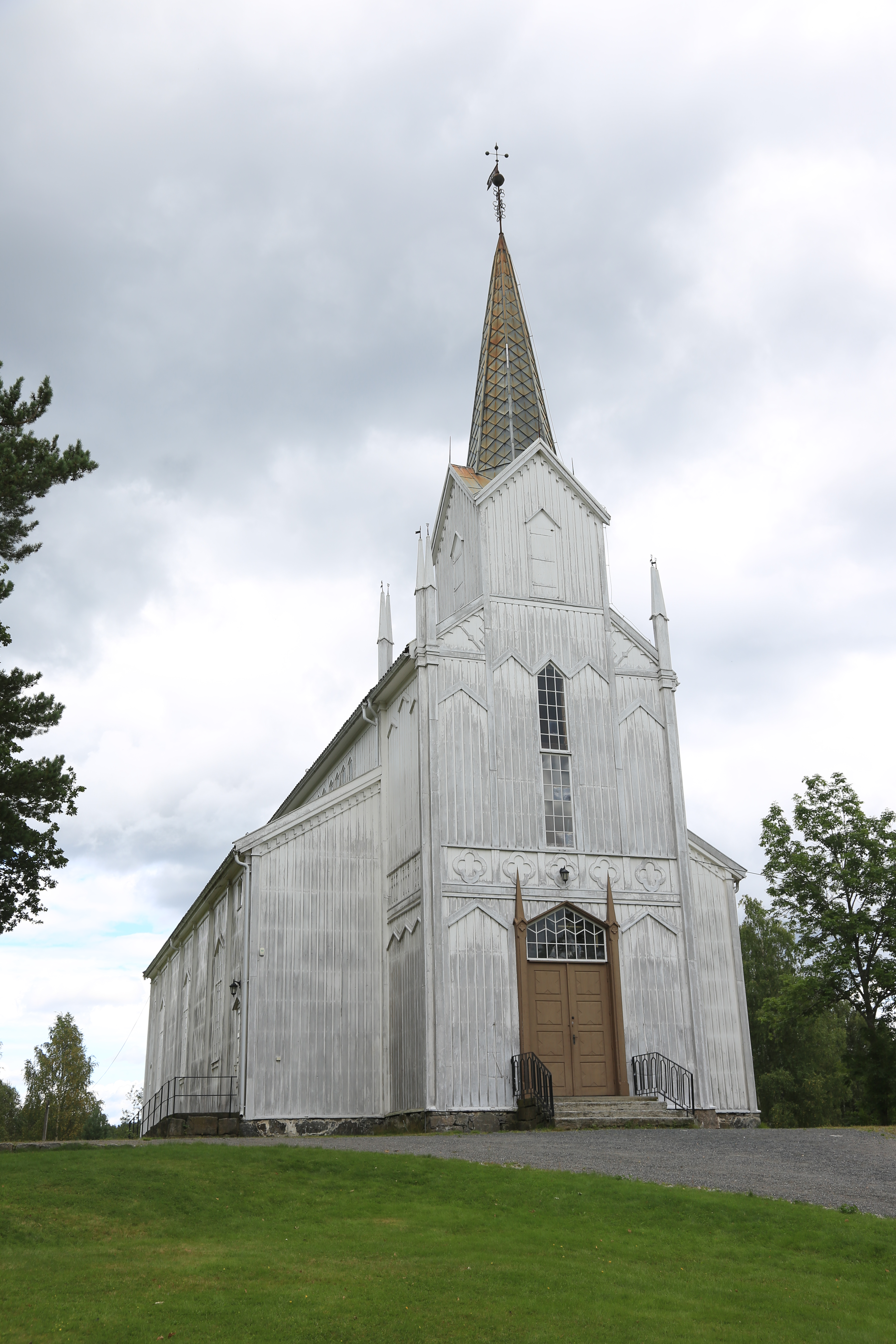
Front entrance of the church

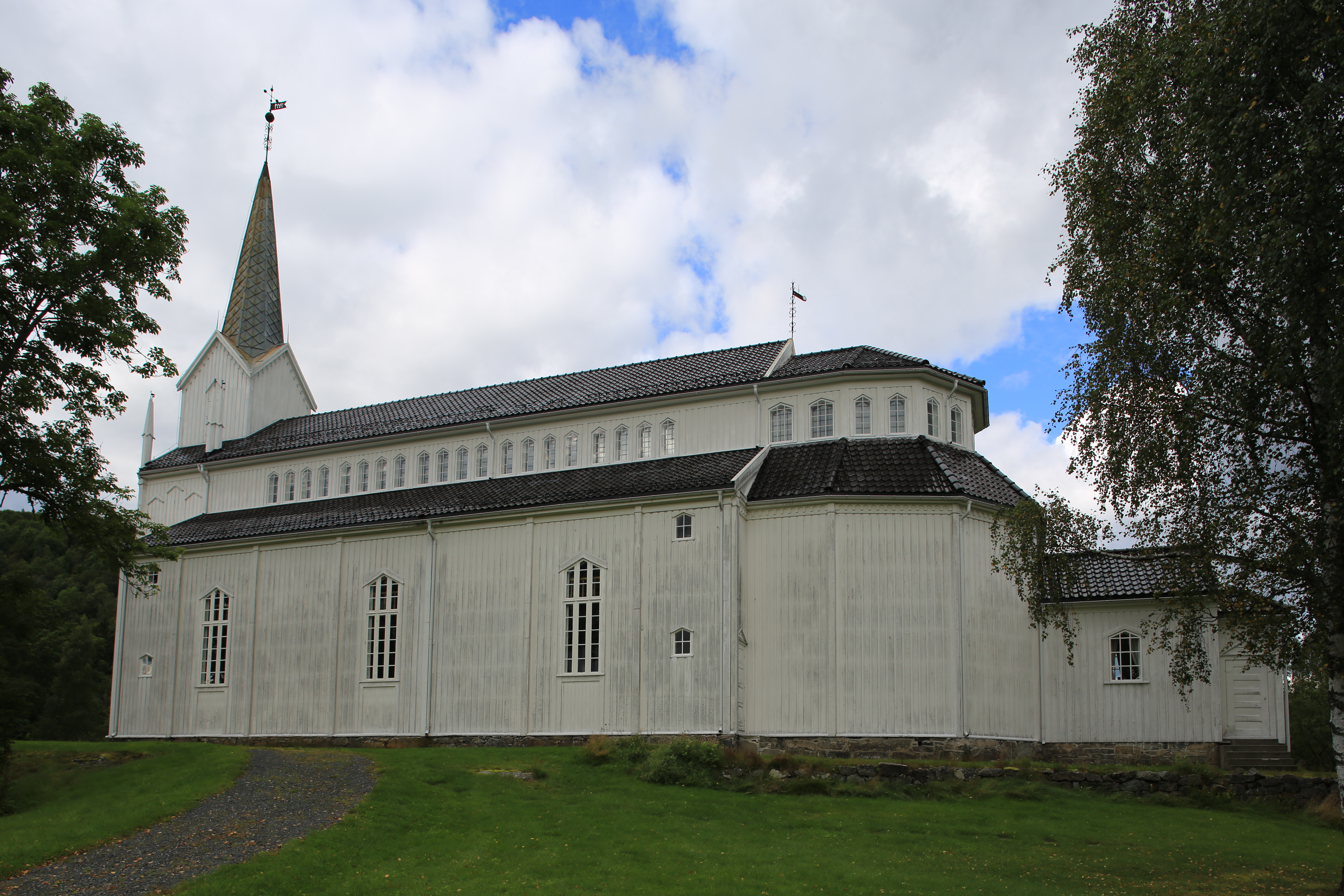
Side view of the church

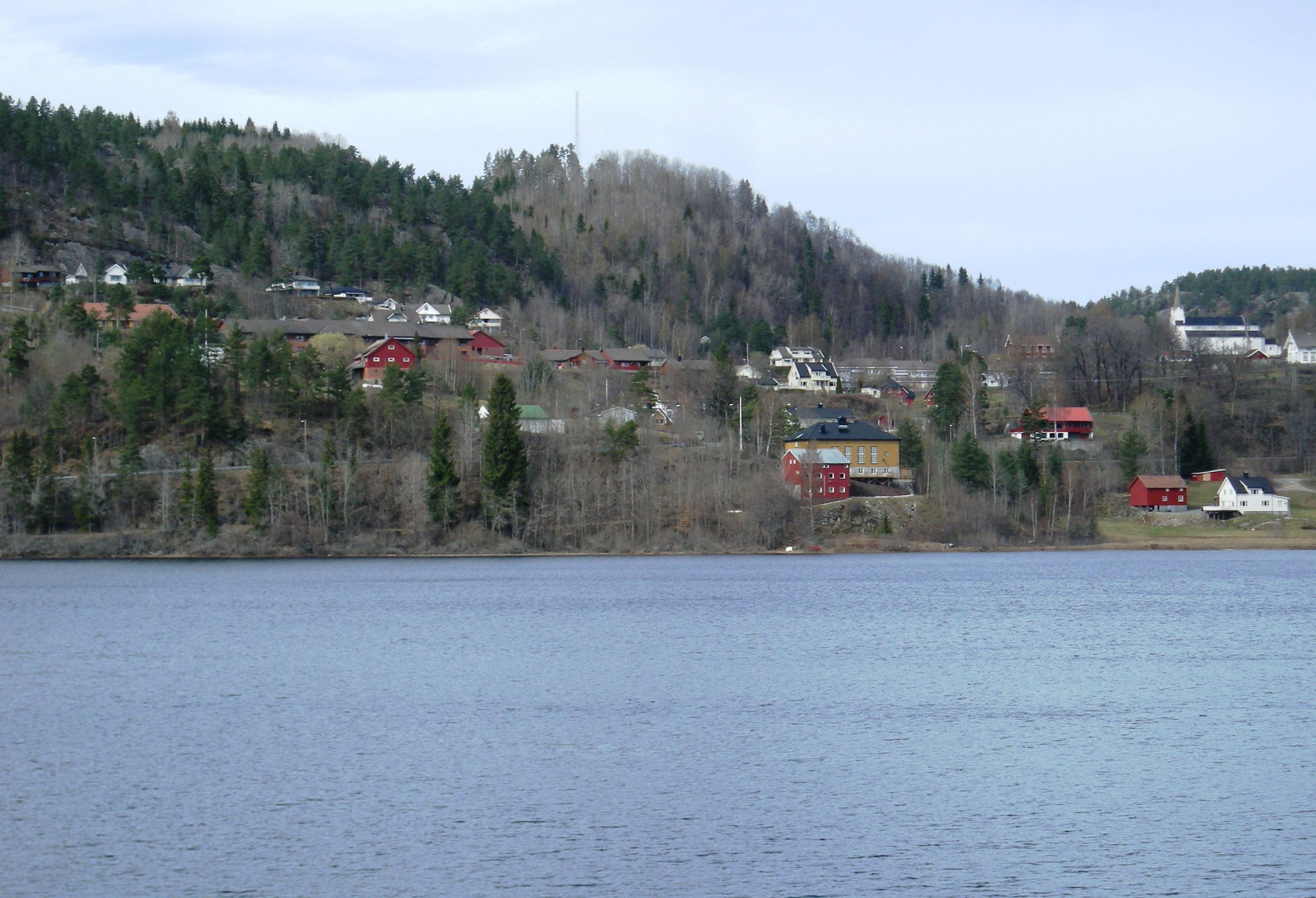
View of the lake Gjerstadvatnet with the church in the upper right corner

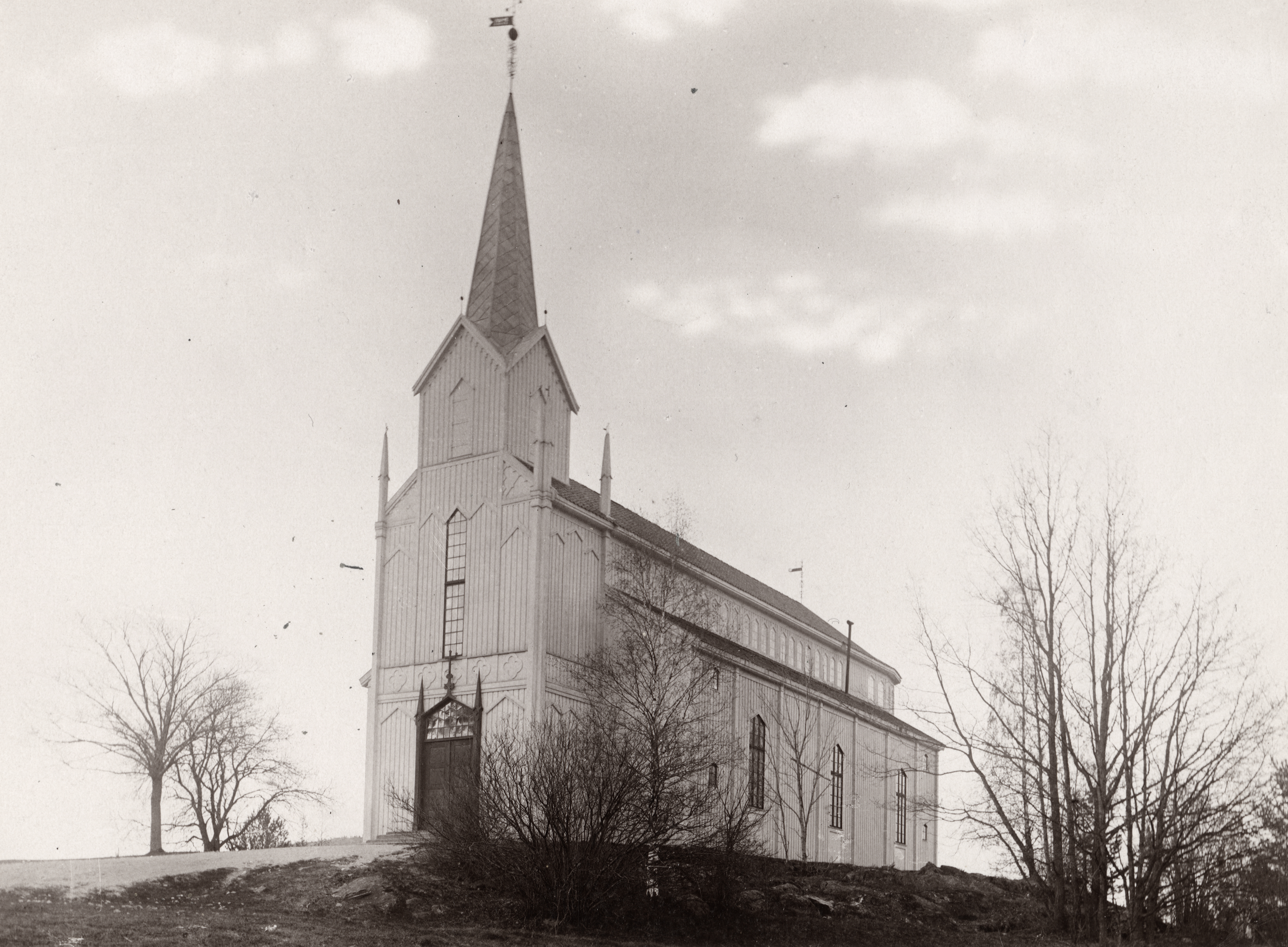
View of the church in the late 1800s

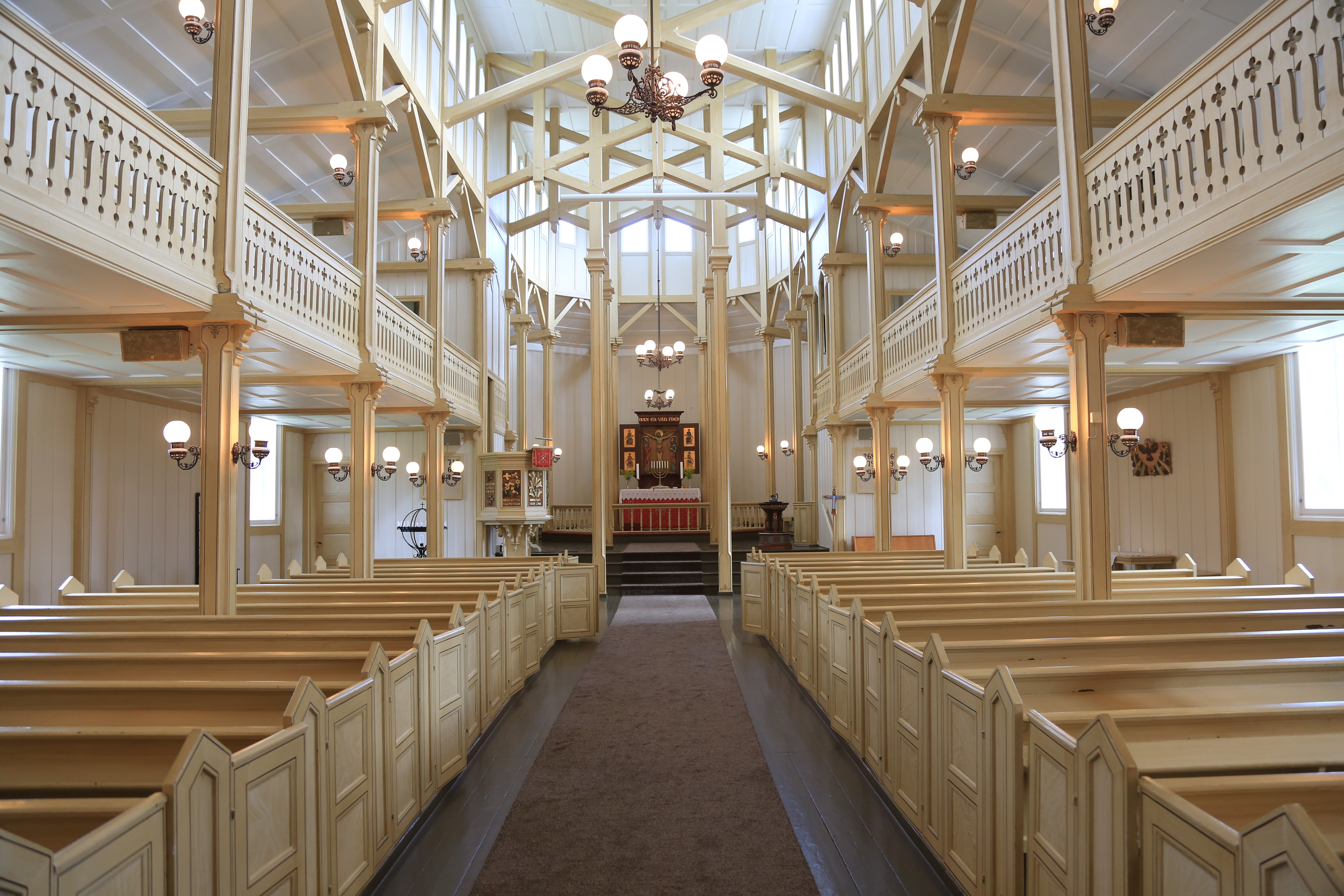
Interior view of the church

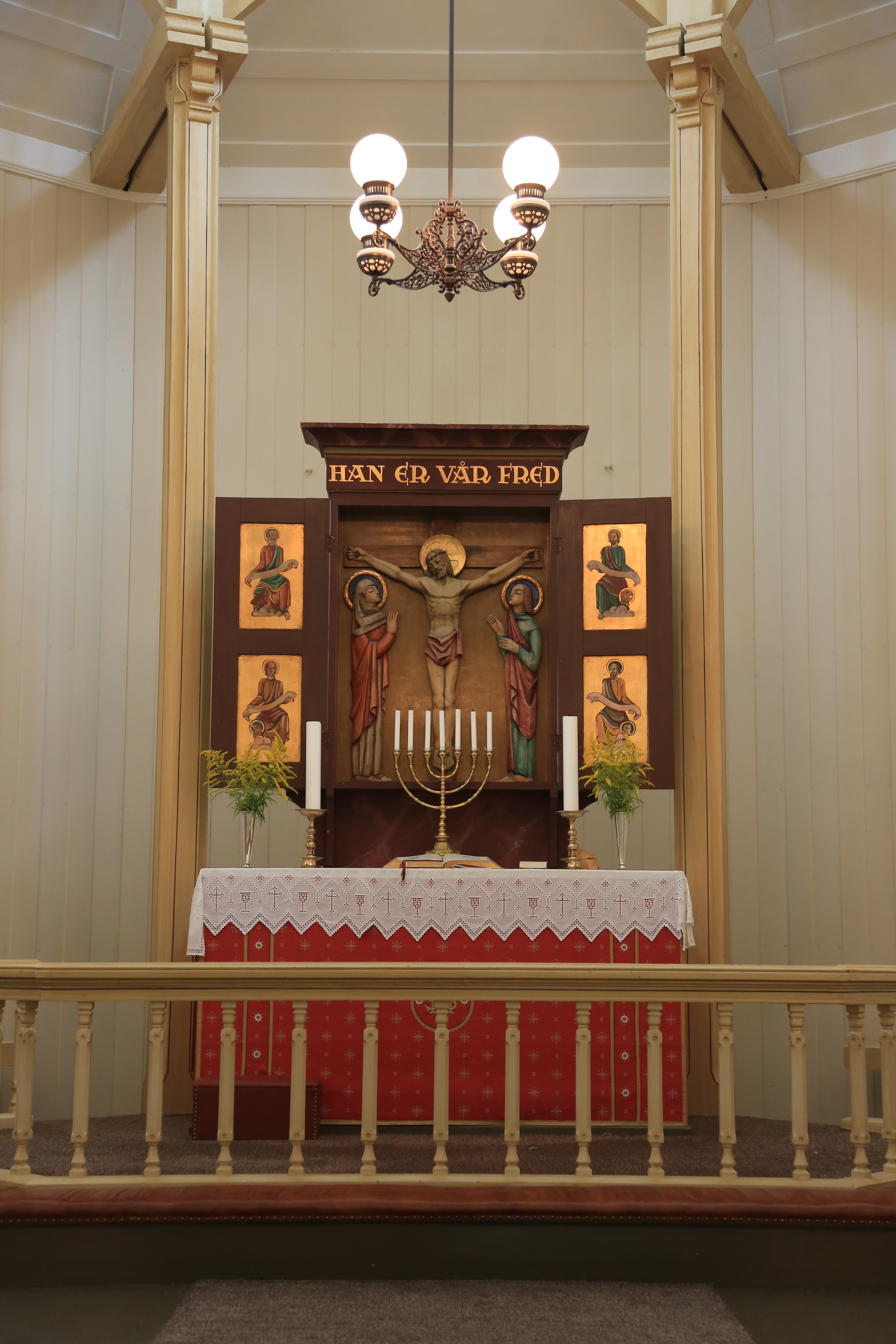
Altarpiece

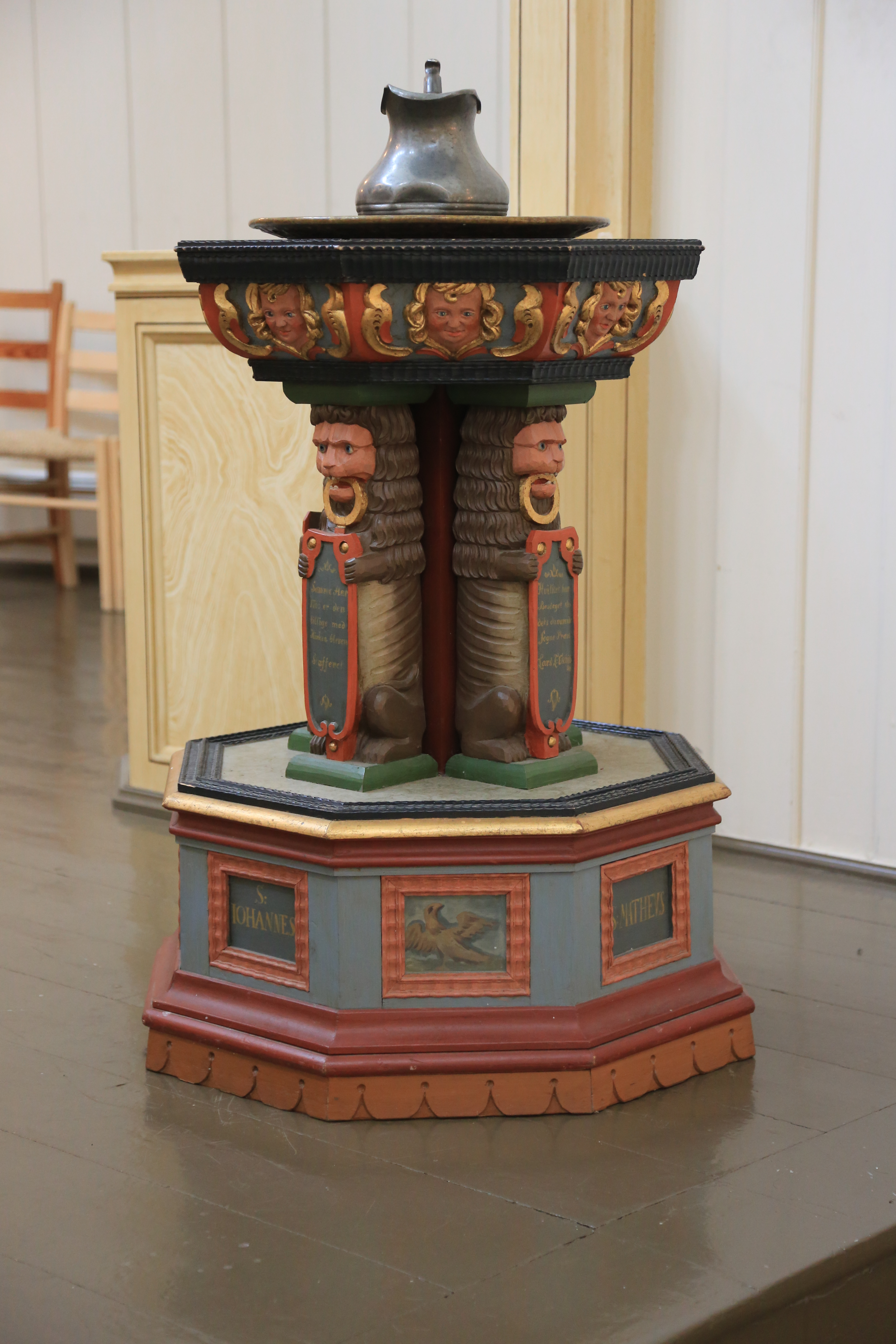
Baptismal font

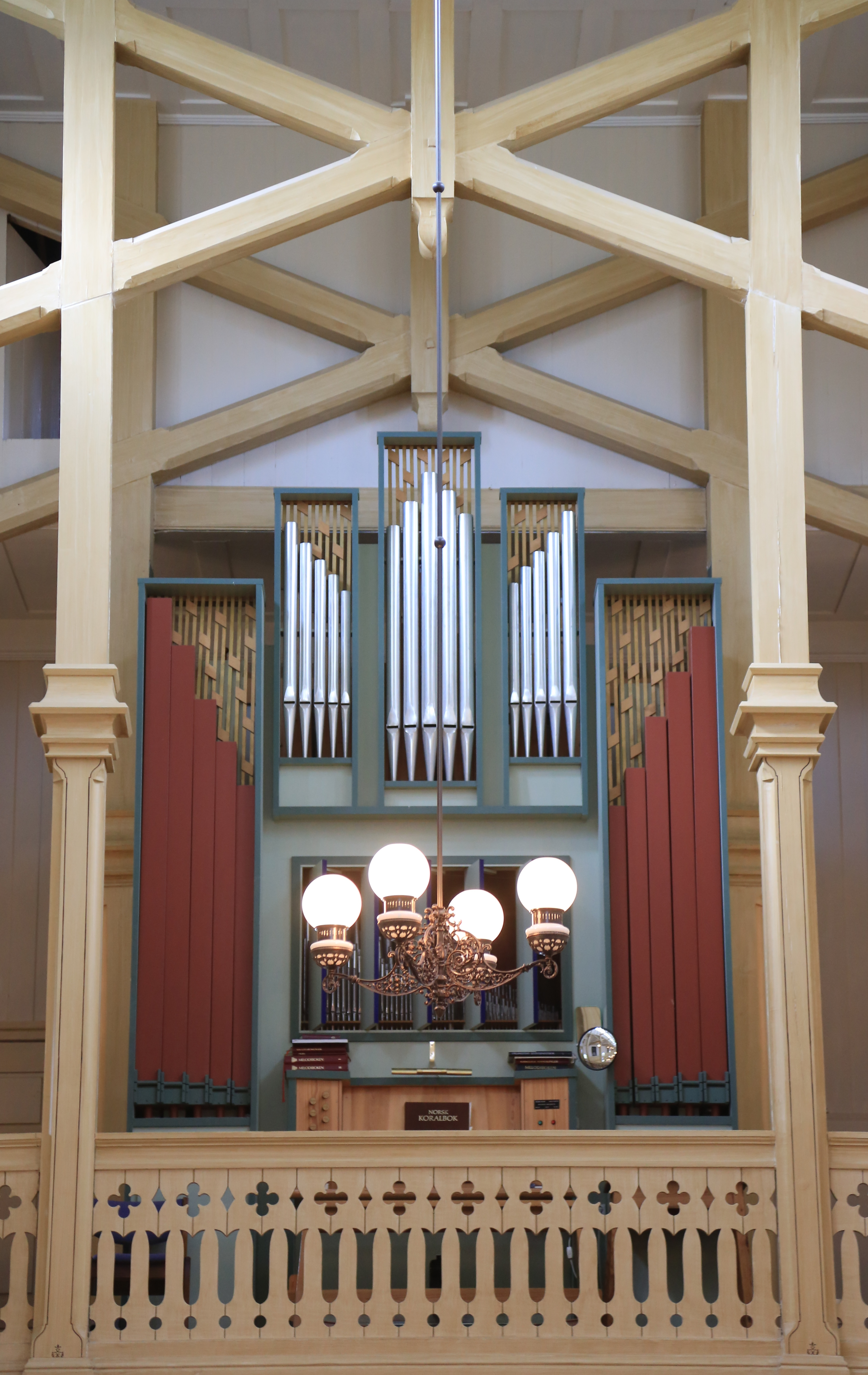
Organ in the back balcony

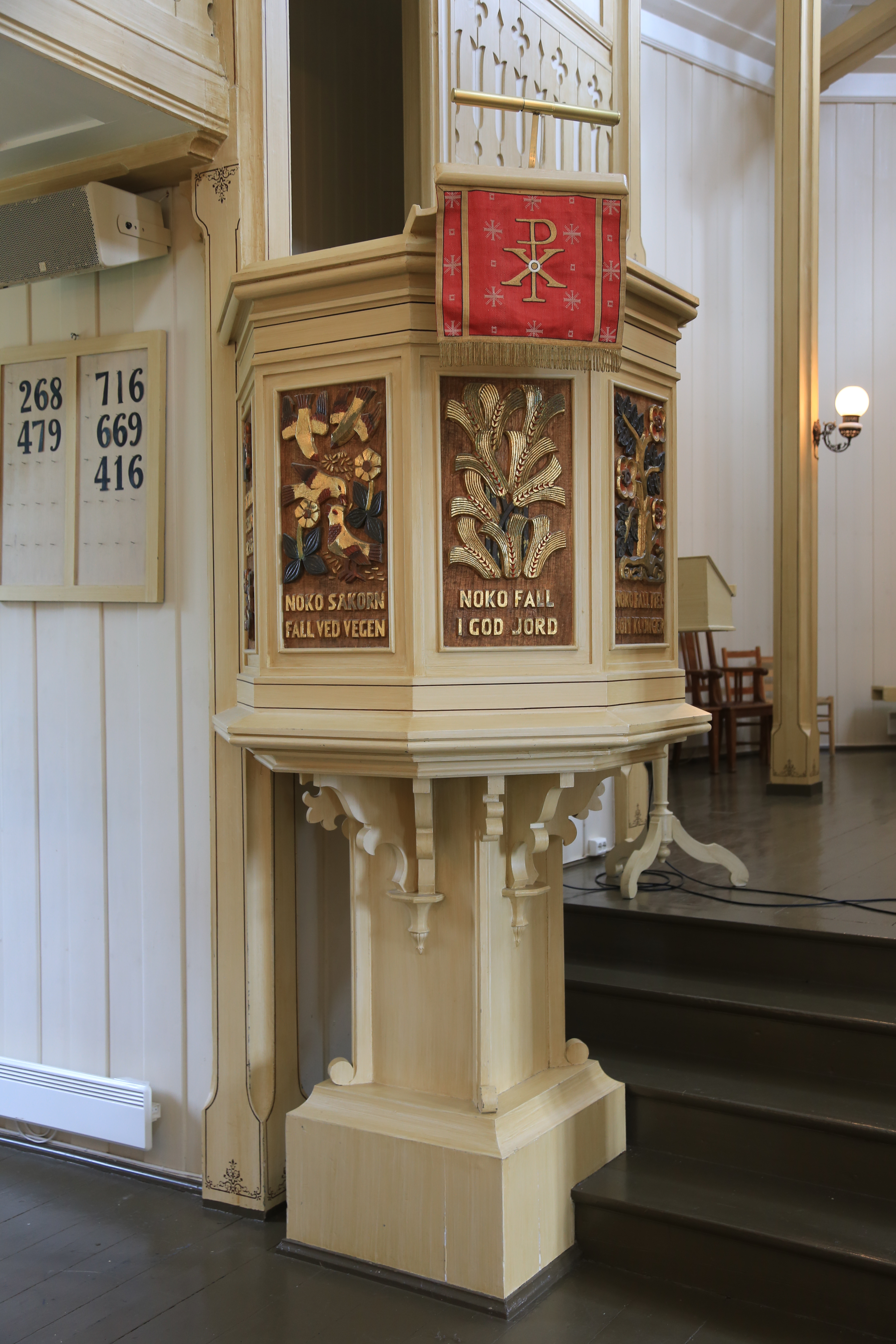
Pulpit

== See also ==
- List of churches in Agder og Telemark
