= Gjerstad Municipality =

Municipality in Agder, Norway

Gjerstad Municipality Gjerstad kommune
- Municipality
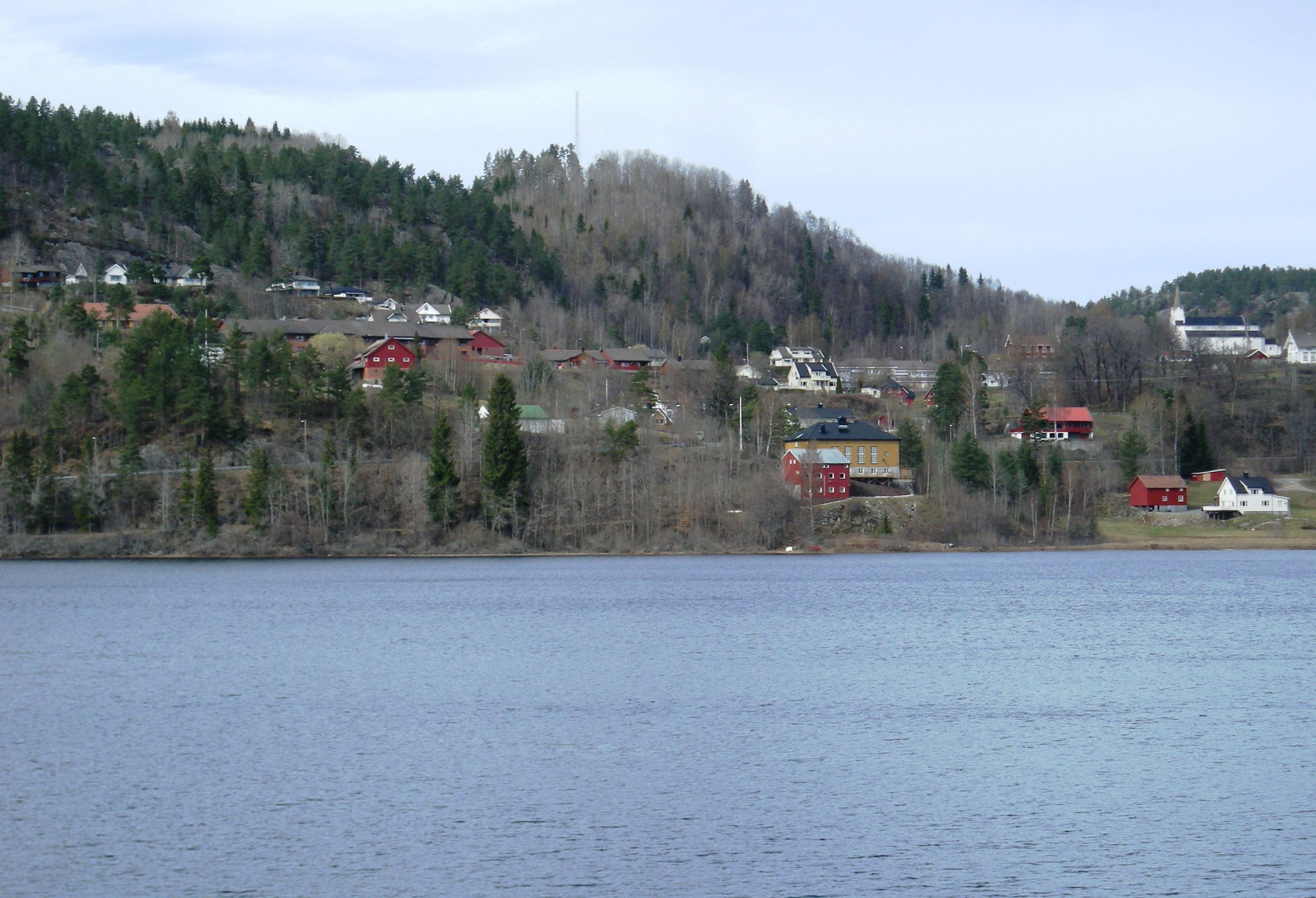
- View of Gjerstad from the Gjerstadvatnet

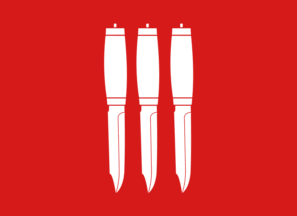
- Flag Coat of arms

- Agder within Norway

- Gjerstad within Agder
- Coordinates: 58°53′33″N 08°57′24″E
- Country: Norway
- County: Agder
- District: Østre Agder
- Established: 1 Jan 1838
  - Created as: Formannskapsdistrikt
- Administrative centre: Gjerstad

Government
  - Mayor (2023): Steinar Pedersen (H)

Area
  - Total: 322.13 km^{2} (124.38 sq mi)
  - Land: 307.57 km^{2} (118.75 sq mi)
  - Water: 14.56 km^{2} (5.62 sq mi) 4.5%
  - Rank: #256 in Norway
- Highest elevation: 588.21 m (1,929.8 ft)

Population (2026)
  - Total: 2,502
  - Rank: #255 in Norway
  - Density: 8.1/km^{2} (21/sq mi)
  - Change (10 years): ▲ +1.2%
- Demonym(s): Gjersdøl; Gjersdøling

Official language
  - Norwegian form: Neutral
- Time zone: UTC+01:00 (CET)
  - Summer (DST): UTC+02:00 (CEST)
- ISO 3166 code: NO-4211
- Website: Official website

Gjerstad is a municipality in Agder county, Norway. It is located in the traditional region of Sørlandet, in the southeastern part of the county, along the border with Telemark county. The administrative centre of the municipality is the village of Gjerstad. Other villages in the municipality include Ausland, Eikeland, Fiane, Gryting, Østerholt, Rød, Sundebru, and Vestøl.

The 322.13-square-kilometre (124.38 sq mi) municipality is the 256th largest by area out of the 357 municipalities in Norway. Gjerstad Municipality is the 255th most populous municipality in Norway with a population of 2,502. The municipality's population density is 8.1 inhabitants per square kilometre (21/sq mi) and its population has increased by 1.2% over the previous 10-year period.

== General information ==
=== Administrative history ===
The parish of Gjerstad was established as a municipality on 1 January 1838 (see formannskapsdistrikt law). The borders of the municipality have not changed since that time (which is pretty rare among municipalities in Norway).

In 2020, there were many municipal and county mergers across Norway due to the work of the Solberg cabinet. Historically, this municipality was part of the old Aust-Agder county. On 1 January 2020, the municipality became a part of the newly-formed Agder county (after Aust-Agder and Vest-Agder counties were merged).

=== Name ===
The municipality (originally the parish) is named after the old Gjerstad farm (Old Norse: Geirreksstaðir) since the first Gjerstad Church was built there. The meaning of the first element is uncertain. One possibility is that it is the genitive case of the male name Geirrekr. Another possibility is that it comes from the word geirr which means "spear". The last element of the name is the plural form of staðr which means "place", "abode", or "town". Historically, the name of the parish was spelled Gerikstadum (c. 1400), Gierestat (c. 1567), Gierrestad, and Gjerrestad.

=== Coat of arms ===
The coat of arms was granted on 18 April 1986. The official blazon is "Gules, three knives argent in fess palewise points to the base" (Norwegian: På raud grunn tre opprette sølv knivar). This means the arms have a red field (background) and the charge is three knives pointing downwards. The knives have a tincture of argent which means it is commonly colored white, but if it is made out of metal, then silver is used. The knife was chosen as a symbol for the smithies and knife makers in the municipality. Knife making has long been a local tradition for which Gjerstad is well known. The arms were designed by Odd Kjell Mostad. The municipal flag has the same design as the coat of arms.

=== Churches ===
The Church of Norway has one parish (sokn) within Gjerstad Municipality. It is part of the Aust-Nedenes prosti (deanery) in the Diocese of Agder og Telemark.

Churches in Gjerstad Municipality
Parish (sokn)	Church name	Location of the church	Year built
Gjerstad	Gjerstad Church	Gjerstad	1848

== History ==
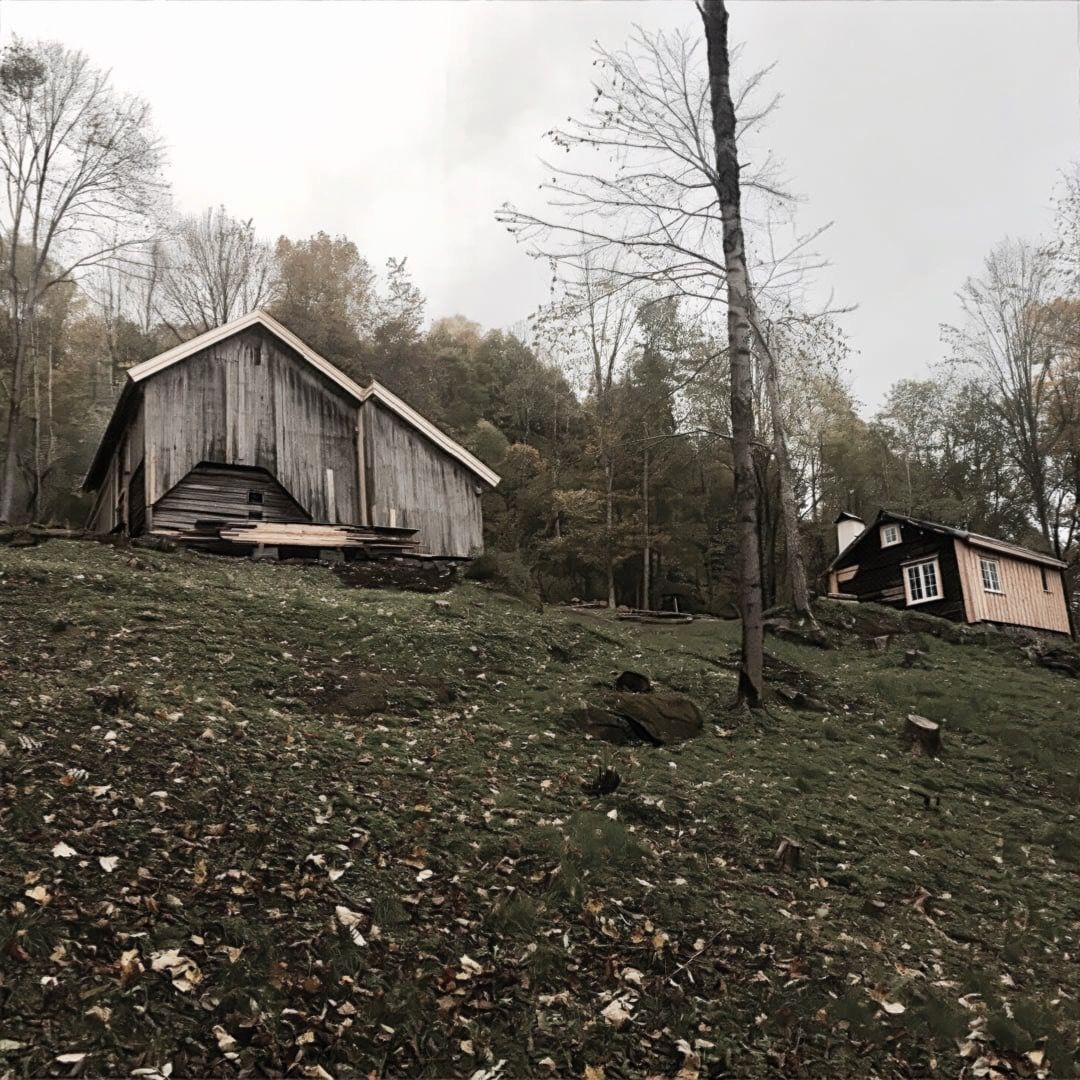
View of a cotter's home at Lia in Gjerstad

Until about 1650, the prestegjeld of Gjerstad (the precursor to today's municipality) was named Vissedal (from vidr-ser-dalr meaning "wood-sea-dale"), a very proper description of the area. Gjerstad has been inhabited from the Stone Age and Viking Age through modern times. Agriculture has long been important, and until only decades ago the more marginal outfields in Upper Gjerstad were still utilized. Forestry also provided an important historic economic contribution, and logs were driven on rivers and streams in the municipality. To aid log transport by floating, numerous dams were constructed. Eikeland Ironworks were a significant contribution to the economy as well.

== Geography ==
Gjerstad Municipality has numerous glacially formed features, including a U-shaped valley, tarns, and lakes, most notably the large lake Gjerstadvatnet. The highest point in the municipality is a 588.21-metre (1,929.8 ft) point on the side of the mountain Solhomfjellet right on the border with Nissedal Municipality where the actual peak of the mountain is located. It located in Agder county and it is bordered to the north by Nissedal Municipality and Drangedal Municipality (both in Telemark county); to the east by Kragerø Municipality (also in Telemark county); to the south by Risør Municipality; and to the southwest by Vegårshei Municipality. There are several larger roads that traverse Gjerstad: European route E18, Norwegian County Road 417, and Norwegian County Road 418.

=== Climate ===
Climate data for Gjerstad stasjon 1991–2020 (32 m, average high/low 2012-2025)
Month	Jan	Feb	Mar	Apr	May	Jun	Jul	Aug	Sep	Oct	Nov	Dec	Year
Mean daily maximum °C (°F)	0.2 (32.4)	2.6 (36.7)	7 (45)	11.5 (52.7)	17.2 (63.0)	21.1 (70.0)	22.9 (73.2)	21.1 (70.0)	17.3 (63.1)	10.9 (51.6)	5.4 (41.7)	1.7 (35.1)	11.6 (52.9)
Daily mean °C (°F)	−3 (27)	−2.6 (27.3)	0.5 (32.9)	5 (41)	10.6 (51.1)	14.7 (58.5)	16.9 (62.4)	15.6 (60.1)	11.7 (53.1)	6.3 (43.3)	1.8 (35.2)	−2.4 (27.7)	6.3 (43.3)
Mean daily minimum °C (°F)	−6.9 (19.6)	−5.8 (21.6)	−3.4 (25.9)	−0.3 (31.5)	5.5 (41.9)	9.8 (49.6)	11.7 (53.1)	10.5 (50.9)	8.2 (46.8)	3.6 (38.5)	−0.1 (31.8)	−4.6 (23.7)	2.3 (36.2)
Average precipitation mm (inches)	112 (4.4)	68 (2.7)	63 (2.5)	59 (2.3)	78 (3.1)	84 (3.3)	92 (3.6)	116 (4.6)	117 (4.6)	136 (5.4)	137 (5.4)	107 (4.2)	1,169 (46.1)
Source 1: yr.no (mean)
Source 2: seklima (average high/low)

== Government ==
Gjerstad Municipality is responsible for primary education (through 10th grade), outpatient health services, senior citizen services, welfare and other social services, zoning, economic development, and municipal roads and utilities. The municipality is governed by a municipal council of directly elected representatives. The mayor is indirectly elected by a vote of the municipal council. The municipality is under the jurisdiction of the Agder District Court and the Agder Court of Appeal.

=== Municipal council ===
The municipal council (Kommunestyre) of Gjerstad Municipality is made up of 17 representatives that are elected to four year terms. The tables below show the current and historical composition of the council by political party.

Gjerstad kommunestyre 2023–2027
Party name (in Norwegian)	Number of representatives
Labour Party (Arbeiderpartiet)	3
Progress Party (Fremskrittspartiet)	2
Conservative Party (Høyre)	6
Christian Democratic Party (Kristelig Folkeparti)	1
Red Party (Rødt)	1
Centre Party (Senterpartiet)	4
Total number of members:	17

Gjerstad kommunestyre 2019–2023
Party name (in Norwegian)	Number of representatives
Labour Party (Arbeiderpartiet)	6
Progress Party (Fremskrittspartiet)	2
Conservative Party (Høyre)	2
Christian Democratic Party (Kristelig Folkeparti)	1
Centre Party (Senterpartiet)	6
Total number of members:	17

Gjerstad kommunestyre 2015–2019
Party name (in Norwegian)	Number of representatives
Labour Party (Arbeiderpartiet)	6
Progress Party (Fremskrittspartiet)	1
Conservative Party (Høyre)	4
Christian Democratic Party (Kristelig Folkeparti)	1
Centre Party (Senterpartiet)	5
Total number of members:	17

Gjerstad kommunestyre 2011–2015
Party name (in Norwegian)	Number of representatives
Labour Party (Arbeiderpartiet)	6
Progress Party (Fremskrittspartiet)	2
Conservative Party (Høyre)	6
Christian Democratic Party (Kristelig Folkeparti)	1
Centre Party (Senterpartiet)	5
Liberal Party (Venstre)	1
Total number of members:	21

Gjerstad kommunestyre 2007–2011
Party name (in Norwegian)	Number of representatives
Labour Party (Arbeiderpartiet)	7
Progress Party (Fremskrittspartiet)	1
Conservative Party (Høyre)	5
Christian Democratic Party (Kristelig Folkeparti)	2
Centre Party (Senterpartiet)	4
Liberal Party (Venstre)	2
Total number of members:	21

Gjerstad kommunestyre 2003–2007
Party name (in Norwegian)	Number of representatives
Labour Party (Arbeiderpartiet)	7
Conservative Party (Høyre)	3
Christian Democratic Party (Kristelig Folkeparti)	3
Centre Party (Senterpartiet)	5
Socialist Left Party (Sosialistisk Venstreparti)	1
Liberal Party (Venstre)	2
Total number of members:	21

Gjerstad kommunestyre 1999–2003
Party name (in Norwegian)	Number of representatives
Labour Party (Arbeiderpartiet)	6
Progress Party (Fremskrittspartiet)	2
Conservative Party (Høyre)	2
Christian Democratic Party (Kristelig Folkeparti)	2
Centre Party (Senterpartiet)	8
Liberal Party (Venstre)	1
Total number of members:	21

Gjerstad kommunestyre 1995–1999
Party name (in Norwegian)	Number of representatives
Labour Party (Arbeiderpartiet)	6
Conservative Party (Høyre)	7
Christian Democratic Party (Kristelig Folkeparti)	3
Centre Party (Senterpartiet)	4
Liberal Party (Venstre)	1
Total number of members:	21

Gjerstad kommunestyre 1991–1995
Party name (in Norwegian)	Number of representatives
Labour Party (Arbeiderpartiet)	7
Conservative Party (Høyre)	5
Christian Democratic Party (Kristelig Folkeparti)	2
Centre Party (Senterpartiet)	4
Liberal Party (Venstre)	3
Total number of members:	21

Gjerstad kommunestyre 1987–1991
Party name (in Norwegian)	Number of representatives
Labour Party (Arbeiderpartiet)	10
Conservative Party (Høyre)	3
Christian Democratic Party (Kristelig Folkeparti)	3
Centre Party (Senterpartiet)	3
Socialist Left Party (Sosialistisk Venstreparti)	1
Liberal Party (Venstre)	1
Total number of members:	21

Gjerstad kommunestyre 1983–1987
Party name (in Norwegian)	Number of representatives
Labour Party (Arbeiderpartiet)	11
Conservative Party (Høyre)	3
Christian Democratic Party (Kristelig Folkeparti)	3
Centre Party (Senterpartiet)	2
Socialist Left Party (Sosialistisk Venstreparti)	1
Liberal Party (Venstre)	1
Total number of members:	21

Gjerstad kommunestyre 1979–1983
Party name (in Norwegian)	Number of representatives
Labour Party (Arbeiderpartiet)	10
Conservative Party (Høyre)	3
Christian Democratic Party (Kristelig Folkeparti)	4
Centre Party (Senterpartiet)	2
Liberal Party (Venstre)	2
Total number of members:	21

Gjerstad kommunestyre 1975–1979
Party name (in Norwegian)	Number of representatives
Labour Party (Arbeiderpartiet)	10
Conservative Party (Høyre)	1
Christian Democratic Party (Kristelig Folkeparti)	4
Centre Party (Senterpartiet)	3
Socialist Left Party (Sosialistisk Venstreparti)	1
Joint list of the Liberal Party (Venstre) and New People's Party (Nye Folkepartiet)	2
Total number of members:	21

Gjerstad kommunestyre 1971–1975
Party name (in Norwegian)	Number of representatives
Labour Party (Arbeiderpartiet)	12
Conservative Party (Høyre)	1
Christian Democratic Party (Kristelig Folkeparti)	3
Centre Party (Senterpartiet)	2
Liberal Party (Venstre)	3
Total number of members:	21

Gjerstad kommunestyre 1967–1971
Party name (in Norwegian)	Number of representatives
Labour Party (Arbeiderpartiet)	12
Conservative Party (Høyre)	1
Christian Democratic Party (Kristelig Folkeparti)	3
Centre Party (Senterpartiet)	2
Liberal Party (Venstre)	3
Total number of members:	21

Gjerstad kommunestyre 1963–1967
Party name (in Norwegian)	Number of representatives
Labour Party (Arbeiderpartiet)	12
Conservative Party (Høyre)	1
Christian Democratic Party (Kristelig Folkeparti)	3
Joint List(s) of Non-Socialist Parties (Borgerlige Felleslister)	5
Total number of members:	21

Gjerstad herredsstyre 1959–1963
Party name (in Norwegian)	Number of representatives
Labour Party (Arbeiderpartiet)	12
Christian Democratic Party (Kristelig Folkeparti)	3
Centre Party (Senterpartiet)	2
Liberal Party (Venstre)	4
Total number of members:	21

Gjerstad herredsstyre 1955–1959
Party name (in Norwegian)	Number of representatives
Labour Party (Arbeiderpartiet)	11
Christian Democratic Party (Kristelig Folkeparti)	3
Farmers' Party (Bondepartiet)	3
Liberal Party (Venstre)	4
Total number of members:	21

Gjerstad herredsstyre 1951–1955
Party name (in Norwegian)	Number of representatives
Labour Party (Arbeiderpartiet)	10
Christian Democratic Party (Kristelig Folkeparti)	3
Farmers' Party (Bondepartiet)	2
Liberal Party (Venstre)	5
Total number of members:	20

Gjerstad herredsstyre 1947–1951
Party name (in Norwegian)	Number of representatives
Labour Party (Arbeiderpartiet)	9
Christian Democratic Party (Kristelig Folkeparti)	4
Farmers' Party (Bondepartiet)	2
Liberal Party (Venstre)	5
Total number of members:	20

Gjerstad herredsstyre 1945–1947
Party name (in Norwegian)	Number of representatives
Labour Party (Arbeiderpartiet)	11
Farmers' Party (Bondepartiet)	2
Liberal Party (Venstre)	7
Total number of members:	20

Gjerstad herredsstyre 1937–1941*
Party name (in Norwegian)	Number of representatives
Labour Party (Arbeiderpartiet)	10
Farmers' Party (Bondepartiet)	3
Liberal Party (Venstre)	7
Total number of members:	20
Note: Due to the German occupation of Norway during World War II, no elections were held for new municipal councils until after the war ended in 1945.

=== Mayors ===
The mayor (Norwegian: ordfører) of Gjerstad Municipality is the political leader of the municipality and the chairperson of the municipal council. The following people have held this position:

- 1838–1841: Rev. John Aas
- 1842–1843: Ole Guttormsen Haugen
- 1844–1846: Alf O. Eskeland
- 1846–1847: Ole Torgrimsen Melaas
- 1848–1852: Knut S. Hansen
- 1853–1855: Kittel A. Sunde
- 1856–1859: Nils T. Ulltveit
- 1860–1861: Gunder Hansen Ulltveit
- 1864–1867: Nils T. Ulltveit
- 1868–1869: Gunder Hansen Ulltveit
- 1870–1873: Knut N. Ausland
- 1874–1879: Nils Larsen Røed
- 1880–1881: Lars Th. Røed
- 1882–1883: Jens O. Trydal
- 1884–1885: Nils Larsen Røed
- 1886–1891: Svenum T. Sunde
- 1892–1895: Nils Larsen Røed
- 1896–1898: Kittil Th. Moe
- 1899–1901: Peder K. Eikeland
- 1902–1907: Svend Tellefsen Kveim
- 1908–1916: Lars Th. Eskeland
- 1917–1922: Anders O. Moe
- 1923–1928: G.M. Skomedal
- 1929–1931: Kristen Fløgstad
- 1931–1934: Isak K. Strat
- 1934–1937: Torkjell Imenes
- 1937–1940: Isak K. Strat
- 1941–1945: Samuel Johannessen (NS)
- 1945–1946: Isak K. Strat
- 1947–1947: Olav Hegna (Ap)
- 1948–1955: Teodor Moen
- 1956–1957: Olav Hegna (Ap)
- 1958–1965: Torje Vehus
- 1966–1973: Knut H. Ulltveit (Ap)
- 1975–1979: Arthur Løite (Ap)
- 1980–1983: Finn Birkedal (KrF)
- 1984–1991: Knut H. Ulltveit (Ap)
- 1992–1999: Jan Olav Olsen (H)
- 1999–2003: Kjell Arild Haugen (Sp)
- 2003–2007: Odvar Voie Eikeland (Sp)
- 2007–2011: Rune Hagestrand (H)
- 2011–2015: Kjell Trygve Grunnsvoll (Sp)
- 2015–2022: Inger Løite (Sp)
- 2022–present: Steinar Pedersen (H)

== Attractions ==
- The remains of Eikeland Ironworks can still be seen in the upper valley. Gjerstad was known for its handmade knives and the coat-of-arms recognizes this heritage.
- Horga was a former pagan place of sacrifice which was destroyed by Olav Trygvason, during the introduction of Christianity to Gjerstad. It lies 300 metres (980 ft) from Holmen Gård.
- Holmen Gård in Gjerstad (Norwegian: Holmen Gård i Gjerstad) is the site of a former farm. It was a Norwegian national center for folk art and handicraft until it was sold into private ownership in 2013. The site has been awarded the St. Olaf's Rose (Olavsrosa), a hallmark for Norwegian Heritage which designates especially distinguished places.
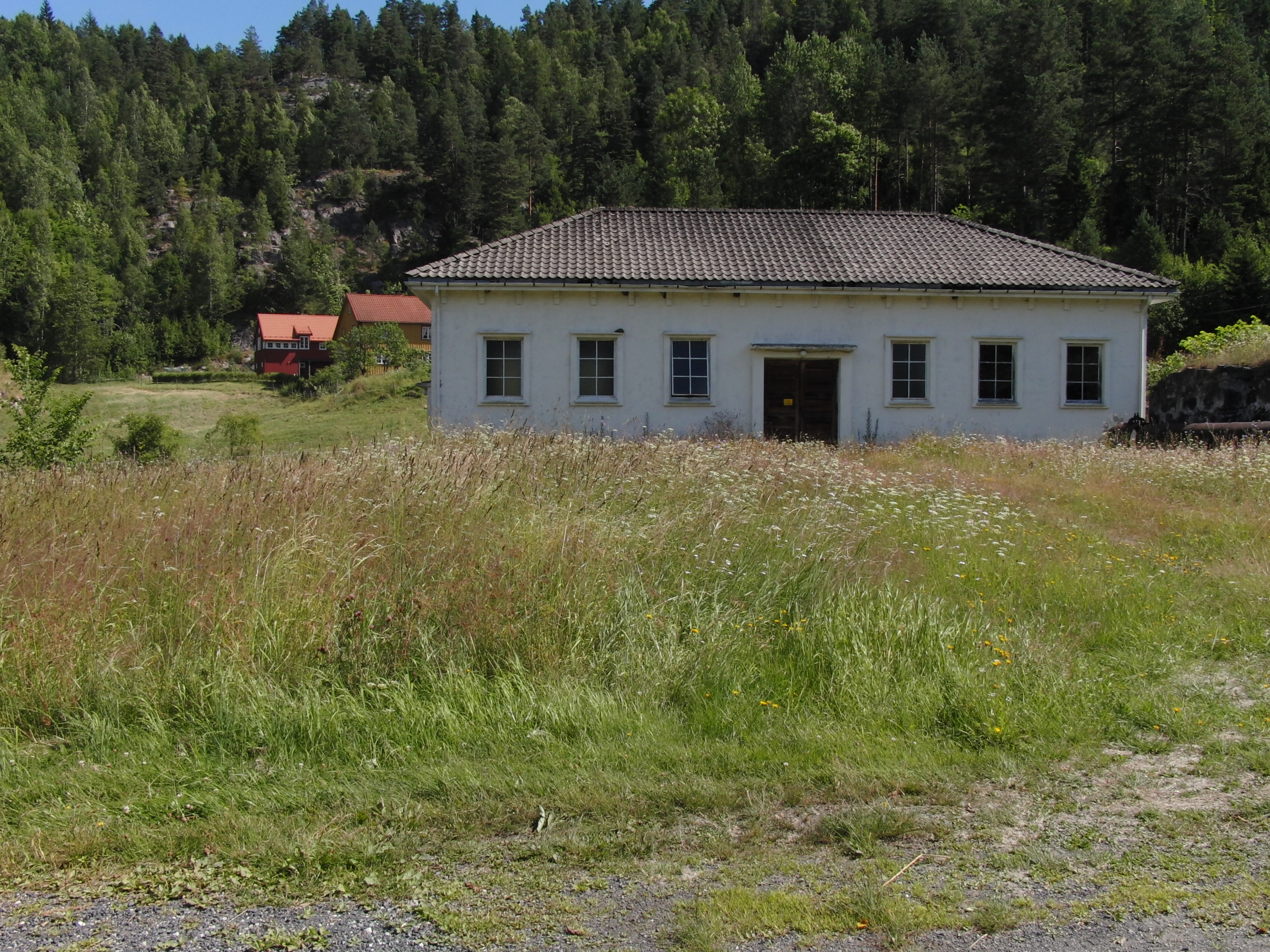
Eikeland verk building

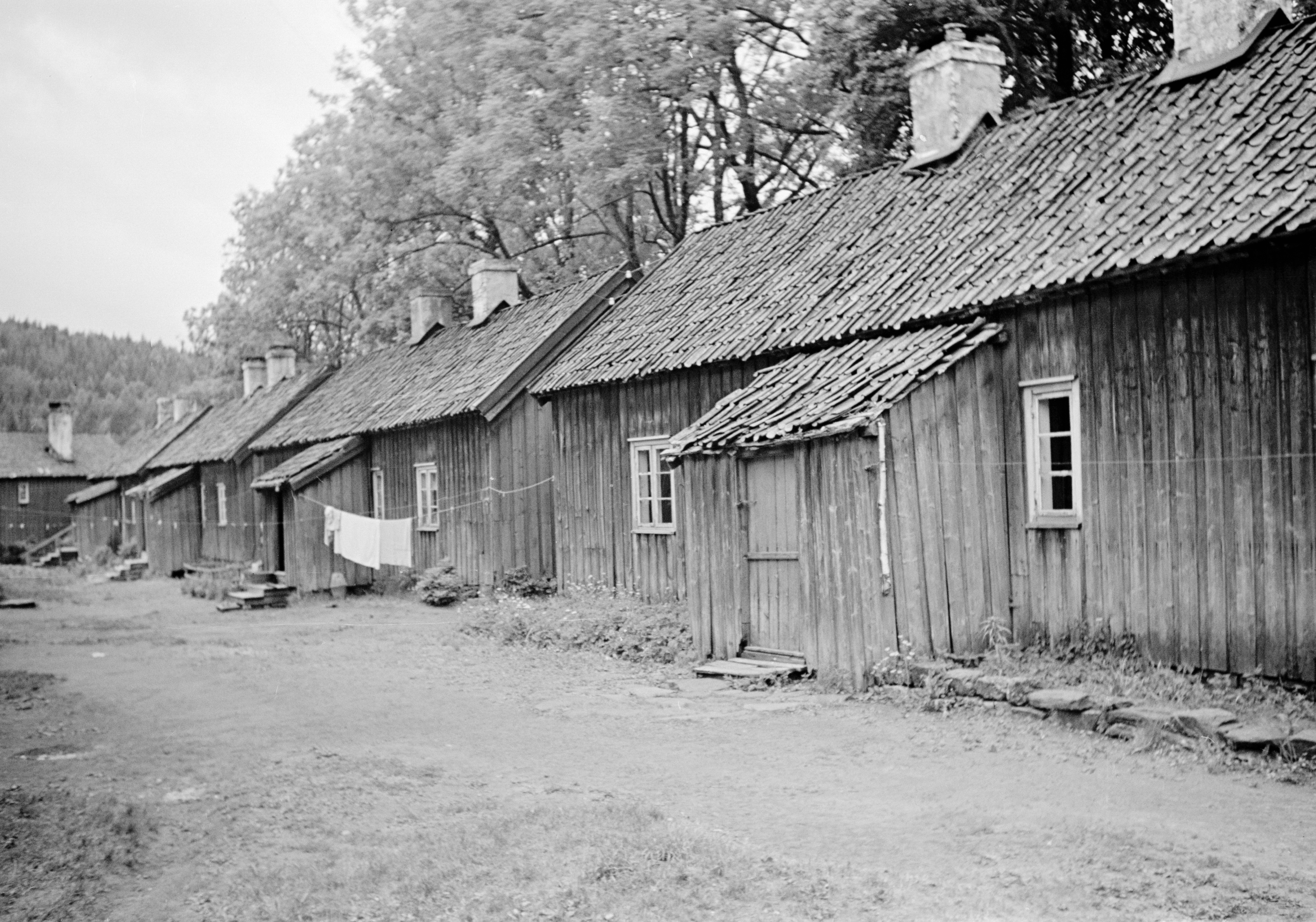
Road with houses at the Eikeland verk in 1939

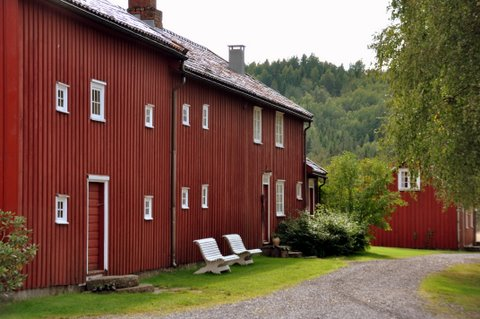
View of the buildings at Holmen Gård
Credit: ©Torgrim Landsverk

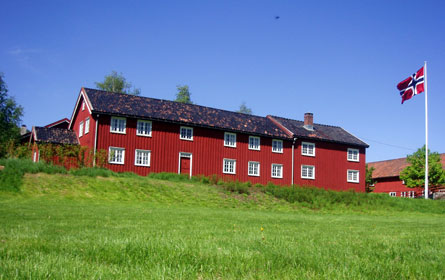
Main house at Holmen Gård
Credit: ©Torgrim Landsverk

== Notable people ==
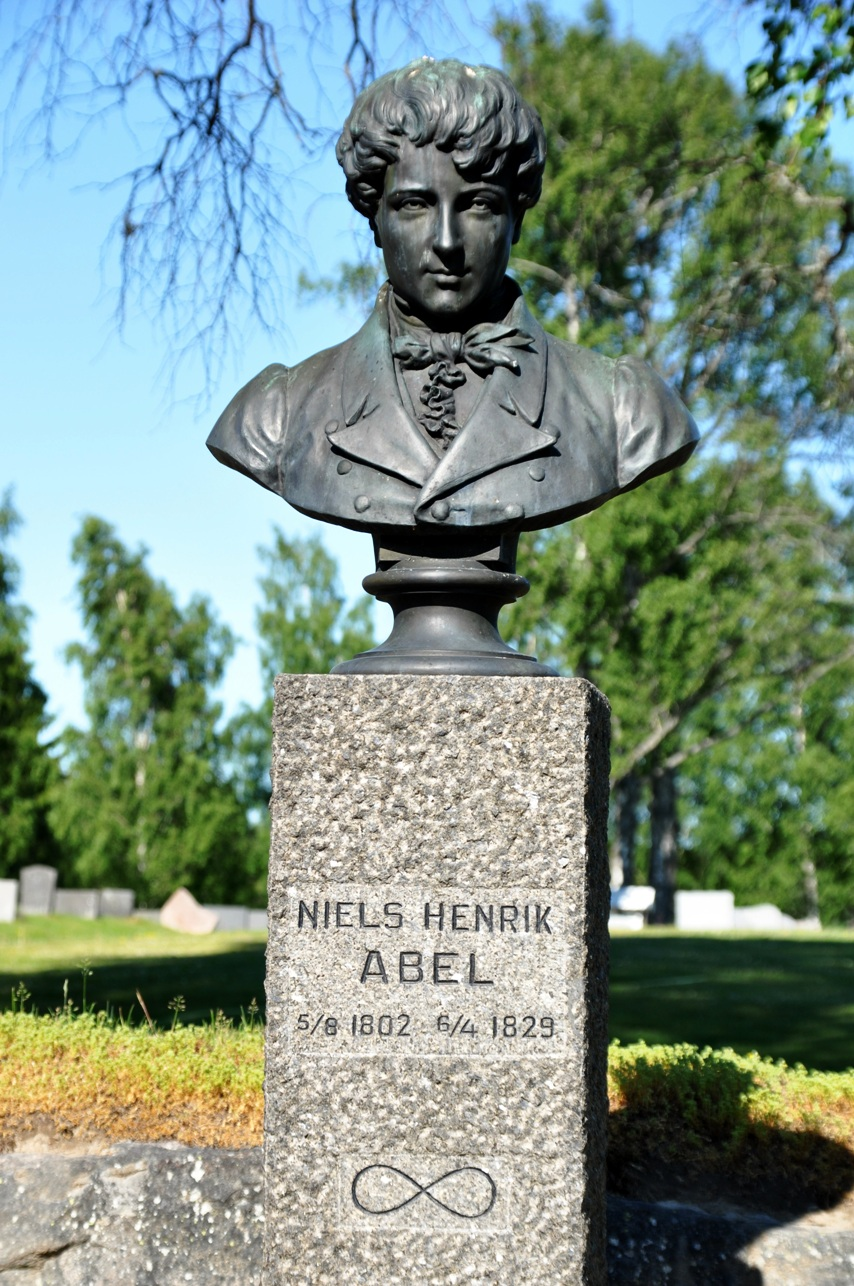
Abel Memorial near Gjerstad Church Credit: ©Torgrim Landsverk

- Hans Mathias Abel (1738–1803), the priest at Gjerstad Church from 1785 to 1804
- Søren Georg Abel (1772–1820), a politician and also priest at Gjerstad from 1804 to 1821
- Niels Henrik Abel (1802–1829), a distinguished mathematician who spent his boyhood in the rectory at Gjerstad and died young of TB
- Svenum Jensen Vævestad (1849 in Gjerstad – 1898), a farmer and politician
- Morten Ansgar Kveim (1892 in Gjerstad – 1966), a pathologist who described the Kveim test
- Magnhild Hagelia (1904 in Gjerstad – 1996), a politician
- Jan Olav Olsen (born 1950), a politician who was mayor of Gjerstad from 1991 to 1999
- Inger Løite (born 1958 in Gjerstad), a politician
- Knut Magne Valle (born 1974 in Gjerstad), a heavy metal guitarist, songwriter, composer, recording studio owner, record producer, and music arranger
- Torbjørn Urfjell (born 1977), a politician
