= Gjerstad Church (Osterøy) =

Church in Vestland, Norway

- Gjerstad kyrkje
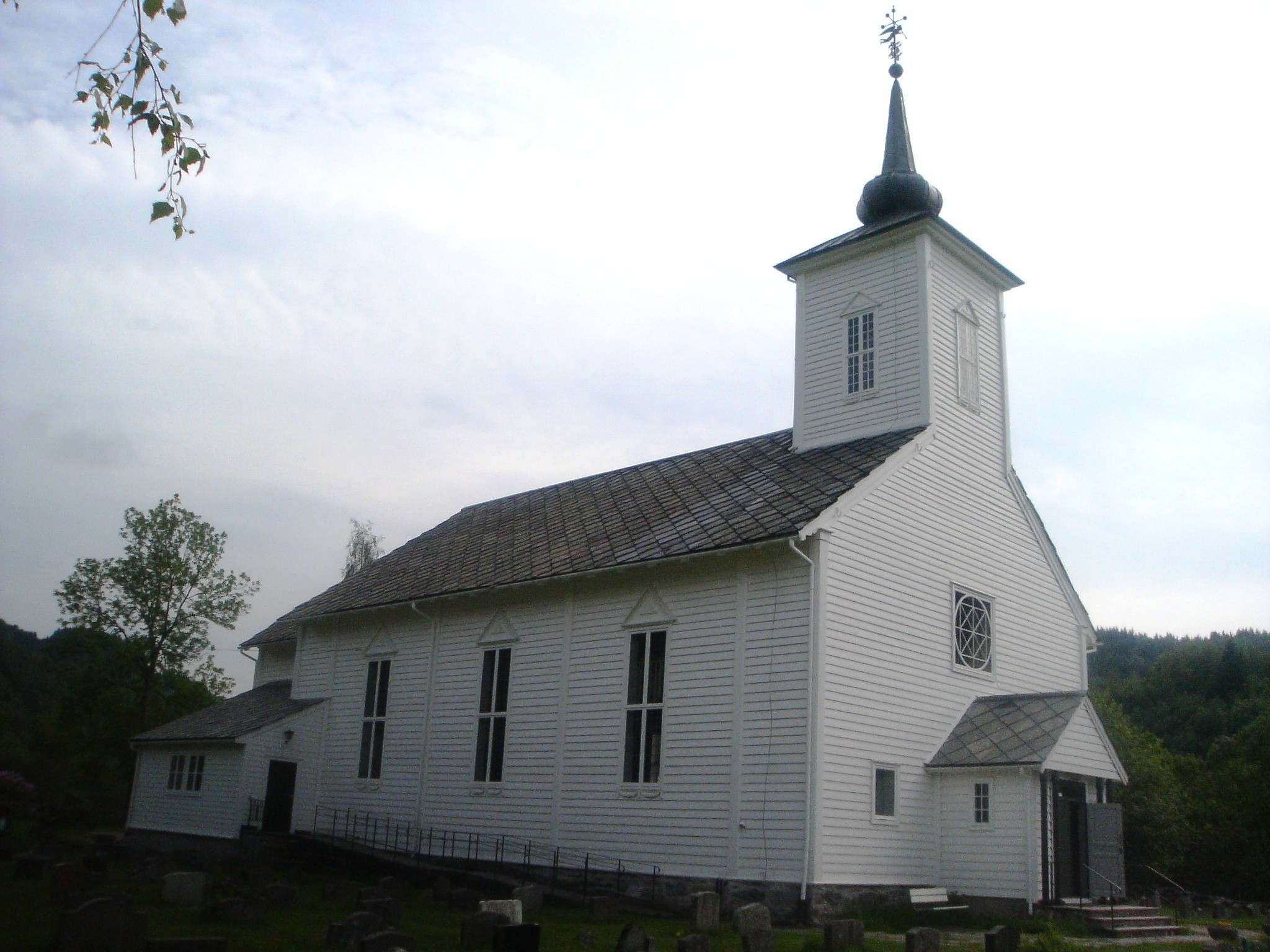
- View of the church
- Gjerstad Church
- 60°29′59″N 5°32′54″E
- Location: Osterøy Municipality, Vestland
- Country: Norway
- Denomination: Church of Norway
- Previous denomination: Catholic Church
- Churchmanship: Evangelical Lutheran

History
- Status: Parish church
- Founded: 13th century
- Consecrated: 1870

Architecture
- Functional status: Active
- Architect: Ole Vangberg
- Architectural type: Long church
- Completed: 1870 (156 years ago)

Specifications
- Capacity: 420
- Materials: Wood

Administration
- Diocese: Bjørgvin bispedømme
- Deanery: Åsane prosti
- Parish: Gjerstad
- Norwegian Cultural Heritage Site
- Type: Church
- Status: Listed
- ID: 84257

Gjerstad Church (Norwegian: Gjerstad kyrkje) is a parish church of the Church of Norway in Osterøy Municipality in Vestland county, Norway. It is located in the village of Gjerstad. It is the church for the Gjerstad parish which is part of the Åsane prosti (deanery) in the Diocese of Bjørgvin. The white, wooden church was built in a long church design in 1870 using plans drawn up by the architect Ole Vangberg. The church has the capacity to seat about 420 people.

== History ==
The earliest records of the church date back to 1329, although it is sure to have existed before then. The first church in Gjerstad was a wooden stave church that was likely built around the year 1210. Some items from this church are preserved at the Bergen Museum such as a soapstone baptismal font that help to date the church. That church was in poor condition by the early 1600s, so in 1622, the church was taken down and a new timber-framed long church was built on roughly the same site (above the old choir and to the east). The new church had a nave that measured about 15.7 by 10.4 metres (52 ft × 34 ft) and a choir that measured about 6.3 by 6.9 metres (21 ft × 23 ft). There was also a 2.5-by-2.5-metre (8 ft 2 in × 8 ft 2 in) church porch with a tower on top. In 1724, the church was sold from the state to a private owner. In 1868, the church was purchased by the municipality and the church was deemed to need replacement. Ole Vangberg was hired to design and build the new church on the same site. He based his designs on the nearby Bruvik Church. Shortly thereafter, in 1870, the church was torn down and a new church was built on the same site. In 1930, there was a fire in the church, but it was repaired soon after. The church was partly rebuilt in 1956-1957 by architect O. Landmark. During the rebuilding, sacristies were built on the north and south sides of the choir and a small church porch was built on the west end of the nave.

== See also ==
- List of churches in Bjørgvin
