= Norwegian County Road 417 =

Road in Agder, Norway

Coordinates: 58.755603°N 08.908410°E

County Road 417
- Bokmål: Fylkesvei 417; Nynorsk: Fylkesveg 417

Route information
- Maintained by Norwegian Public Roads Administration
- Length: 16.5 km (10.3 mi)

Major junctions
- North end: Fv418/ E18 Sundebru, Gjerstad Municipality
- South end: Fv416 Bråten, Vegårshei Municipality

Location
- Country: Norway

Highway system
- Roads in Norway; National Roads; County Roads
← Fv416	→ Fv418

Norwegian county road 417 (Fv417) is a Norwegian county road in Agder county, Norway. The 16.5-kilometre (10.3 mi) long road begins at the Norwegian County Road 416 near the Bråten farm in Vegårshei Municipality and it ends at the junction of the Norwegian County Road 418 and the European route E18 highway at the village of Sundebru in Gjerstad Municipality. The Sørlandsbanen railway line crosses this road twice.
