= Norwegian County Road 416 =

Road in Agder, Norway

Coordinates: 58.748835°N 08.864808°E

County Road 416
- Bokmål: Fylkesvei 416; Nynorsk: Fylkesveg 416

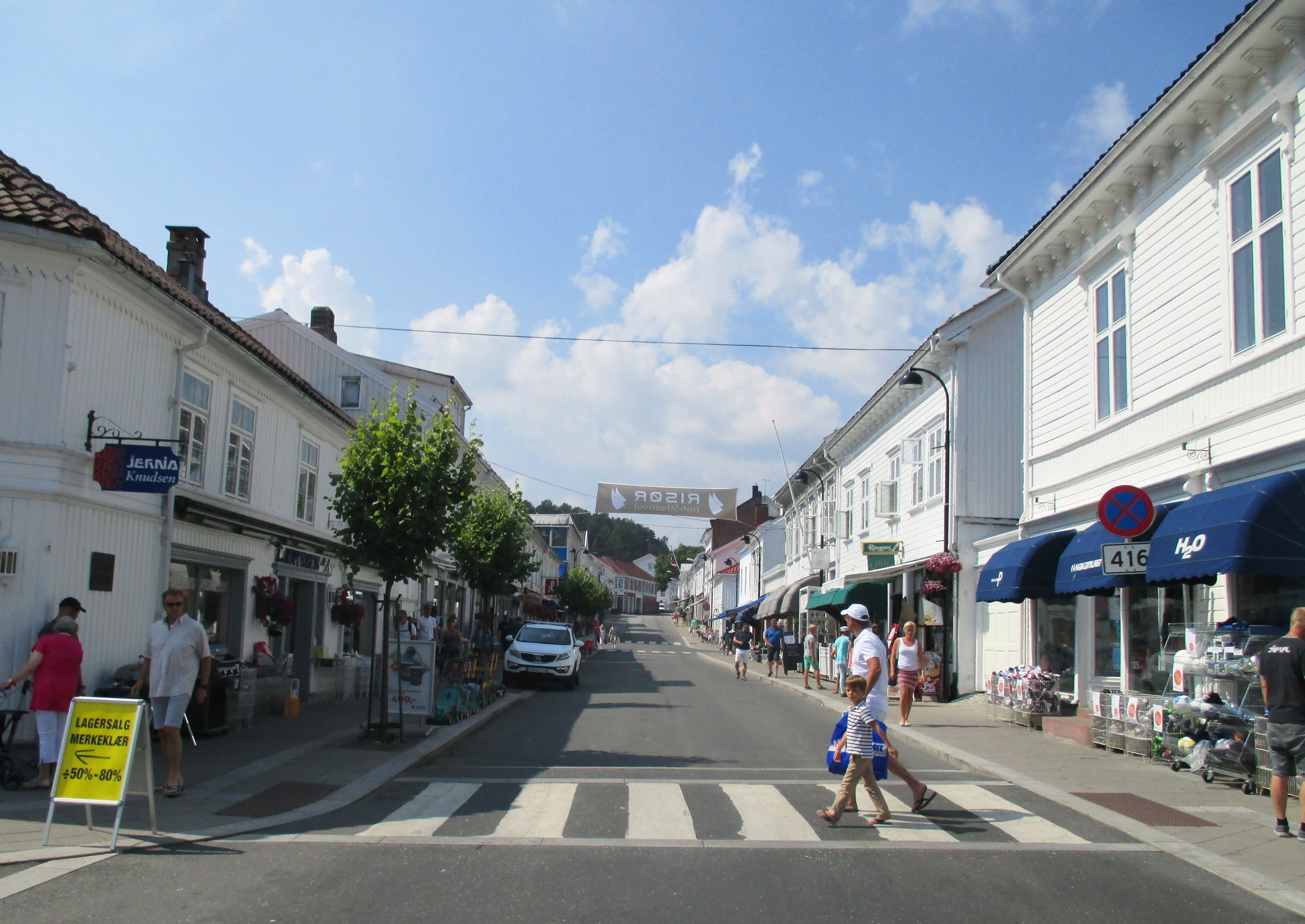
- View of the road in Risør

Route information
- Maintained by Norwegian Public Roads Administration
- Length: 29.2 km (18.1 mi)

Major junctions
- East end: Risør
- Fv411 Bossvika E18 Kvienga; Fv418 Aspelund Fv417 Akland
- West end: Fv414 Myra

Location
- Country: Norway

Highway system
- Roads in Norway; National Roads; County Roads
← Fv415	→ Fv417

Norwegian county road 416 (Fv416) is a Norwegian county road in Agder county, Norway. The 29.2-kilometre (18.1 mi) road runs between the town of Risør in Risør Municipality and the Norwegian County Road 414 in the village of Myra in Vegårshei Municipality.
