= Gjerstad (village) =

Village in Gjerstad Municipality, Norway

- Village
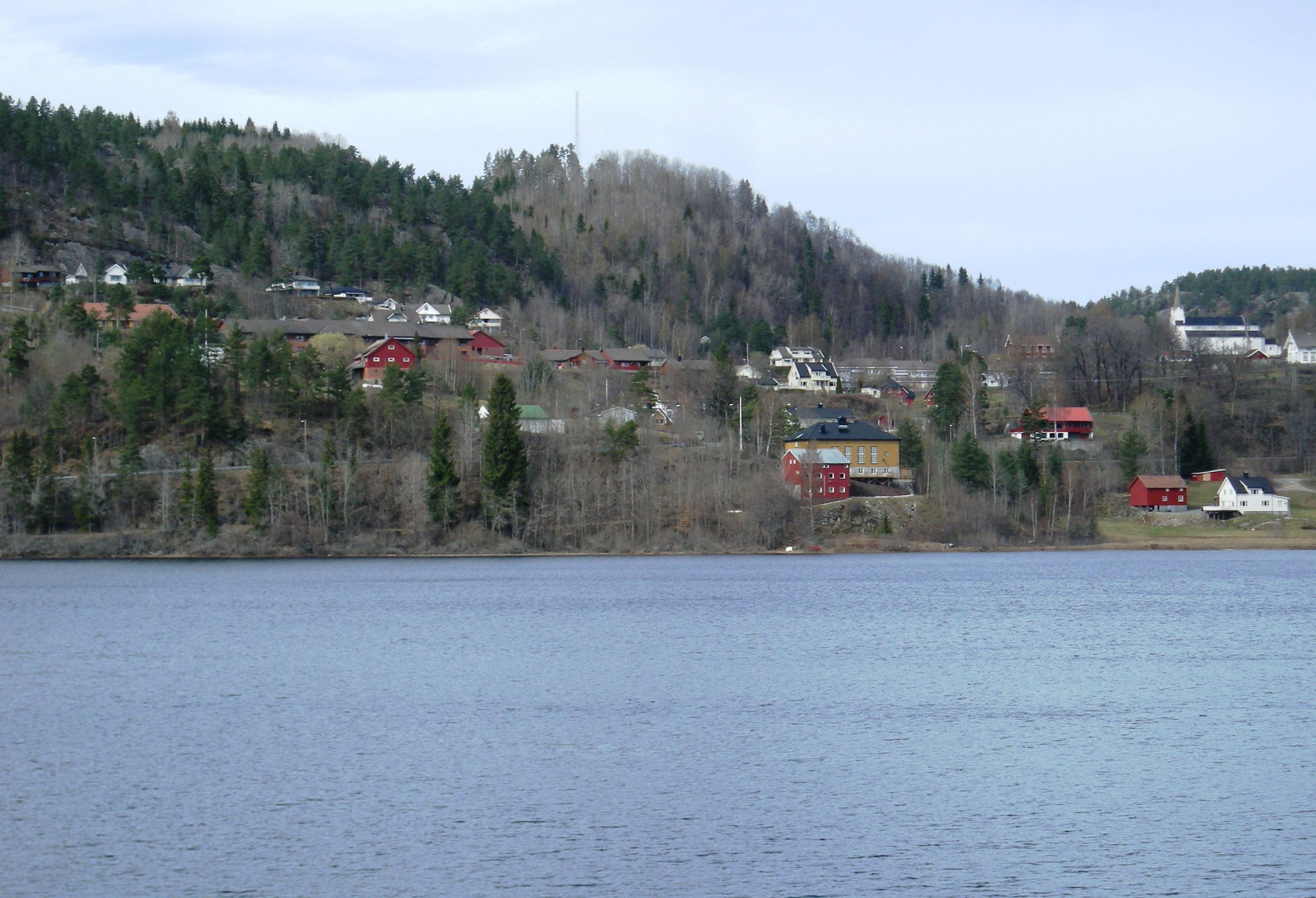
- View of the village from the lake Gjerstadvatnet
- Interactive map of Gjerstad
- Coordinates: 58.8809°N 09.0175°E
- Country: Norway
- Region: Southern Norway
- County: Agder
- District: Østre Agder
- Municipality: Gjerstad Municipality

Area
  - Total: 0.4 km^{2} (0.15 sq mi)
- Elevation: 83 m (272 ft)

Population (2025)
  - Total: 301
  - Density: 753/km^{2} (1,950/sq mi)
- Time zone: UTC+01:00 (CET)
  - Summer (DST): UTC+02:00 (CEST)
- Post Code: 4980 Gjerstad

Gjerstad is the administrative centre of Gjerstad Municipality in Agder county, Norway. The village is located at the northern end of the Lake Gjerstadvatnet at the northern end of Norwegian County Road 418. The Sørlandsbanen railway line passes through the village and stops at Gjerstad Station. Gjerstad Church is located in the village along with a school and several stores.

The 0.4-square-kilometre (99-acre) village has a population (2025) of 301 and a population density of 753 inhabitants per square kilometre (1,950/sq mi).

== Name ==
The village is named after the old Gjerstad farm (Old Norse: Geirreksstaðir), since the Gjerstad Church was built there. One explanation of the name says that the first element is the genitive case of the male name Geirrekr and the last element is staðir which means "homestead" or "farm". Another possibly explanation of the first part of the name says that it comes from the word geirr which means "spear". Historically, the name has been spelled Gerikstadum (c. 1400), Gierestat (c. 1567), Gierrestad, and Gjerrestad.

== Climate ==
Climate data for Gjerstad stasjon 1991–2020 (32 m, average high/low 2012-2025)
Month	Jan	Feb	Mar	Apr	May	Jun	Jul	Aug	Sep	Oct	Nov	Dec	Year
Mean daily maximum °C (°F)	0.2 (32.4)	2.6 (36.7)	7 (45)	11.5 (52.7)	17.2 (63.0)	21.1 (70.0)	22.9 (73.2)	21.1 (70.0)	17.3 (63.1)	10.9 (51.6)	5.4 (41.7)	1.7 (35.1)	11.6 (52.9)
Daily mean °C (°F)	−3 (27)	−2.6 (27.3)	0.5 (32.9)	5 (41)	10.6 (51.1)	14.7 (58.5)	16.9 (62.4)	15.6 (60.1)	11.7 (53.1)	6.3 (43.3)	1.8 (35.2)	−2.4 (27.7)	6.3 (43.3)
Mean daily minimum °C (°F)	−6.9 (19.6)	−5.8 (21.6)	−3.4 (25.9)	−0.3 (31.5)	5.5 (41.9)	9.8 (49.6)	11.7 (53.1)	10.5 (50.9)	8.2 (46.8)	3.6 (38.5)	−0.1 (31.8)	−4.6 (23.7)	2.3 (36.2)
Average precipitation mm (inches)	112 (4.4)	68 (2.7)	63 (2.5)	59 (2.3)	78 (3.1)	84 (3.3)	92 (3.6)	116 (4.6)	117 (4.6)	136 (5.4)	137 (5.4)	107 (4.2)	1,169 (46.1)
Source 1: yr.no (mean)
Source 2: seklima (average high/low)

== Media gallery ==
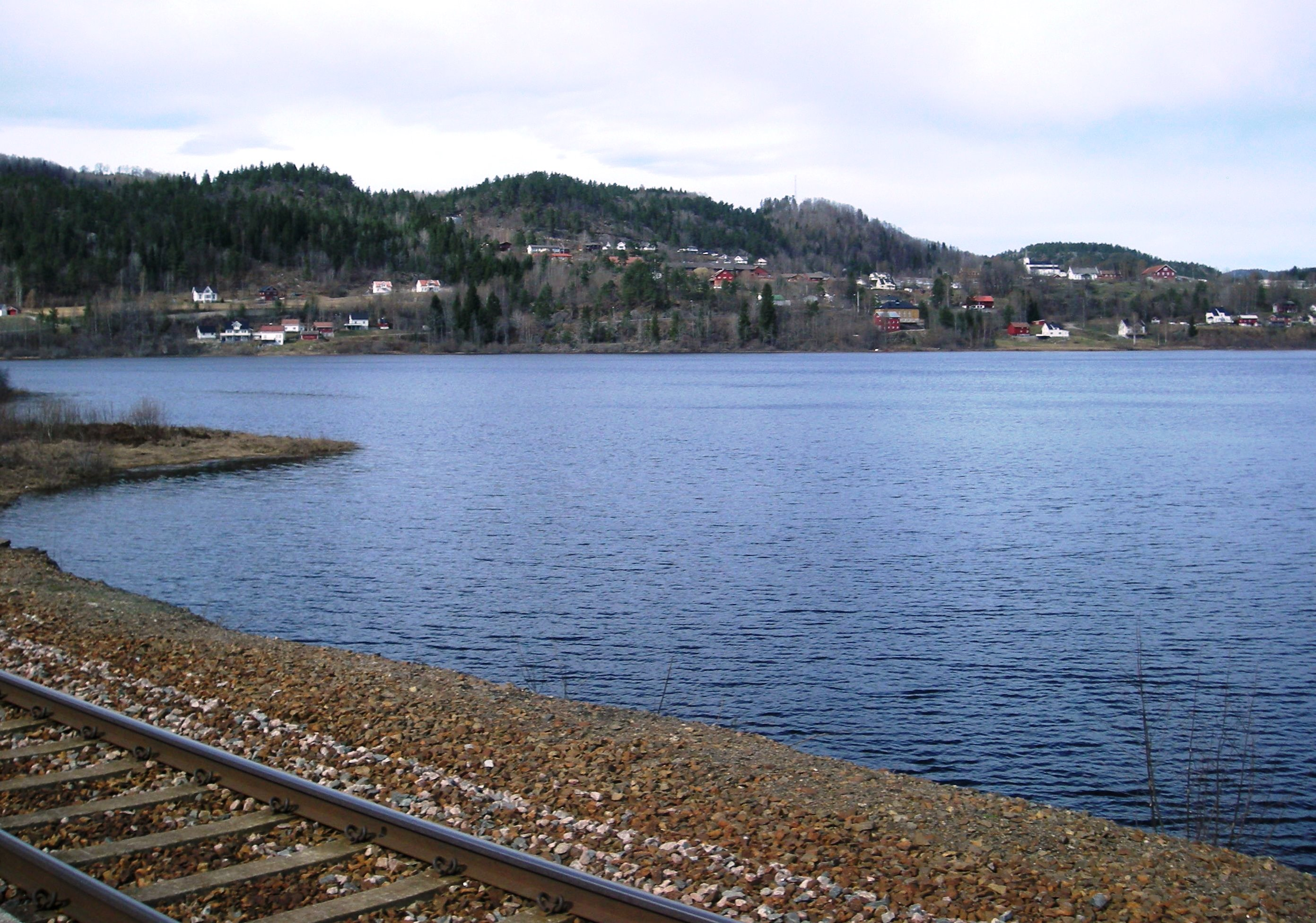
View of the village from the train station

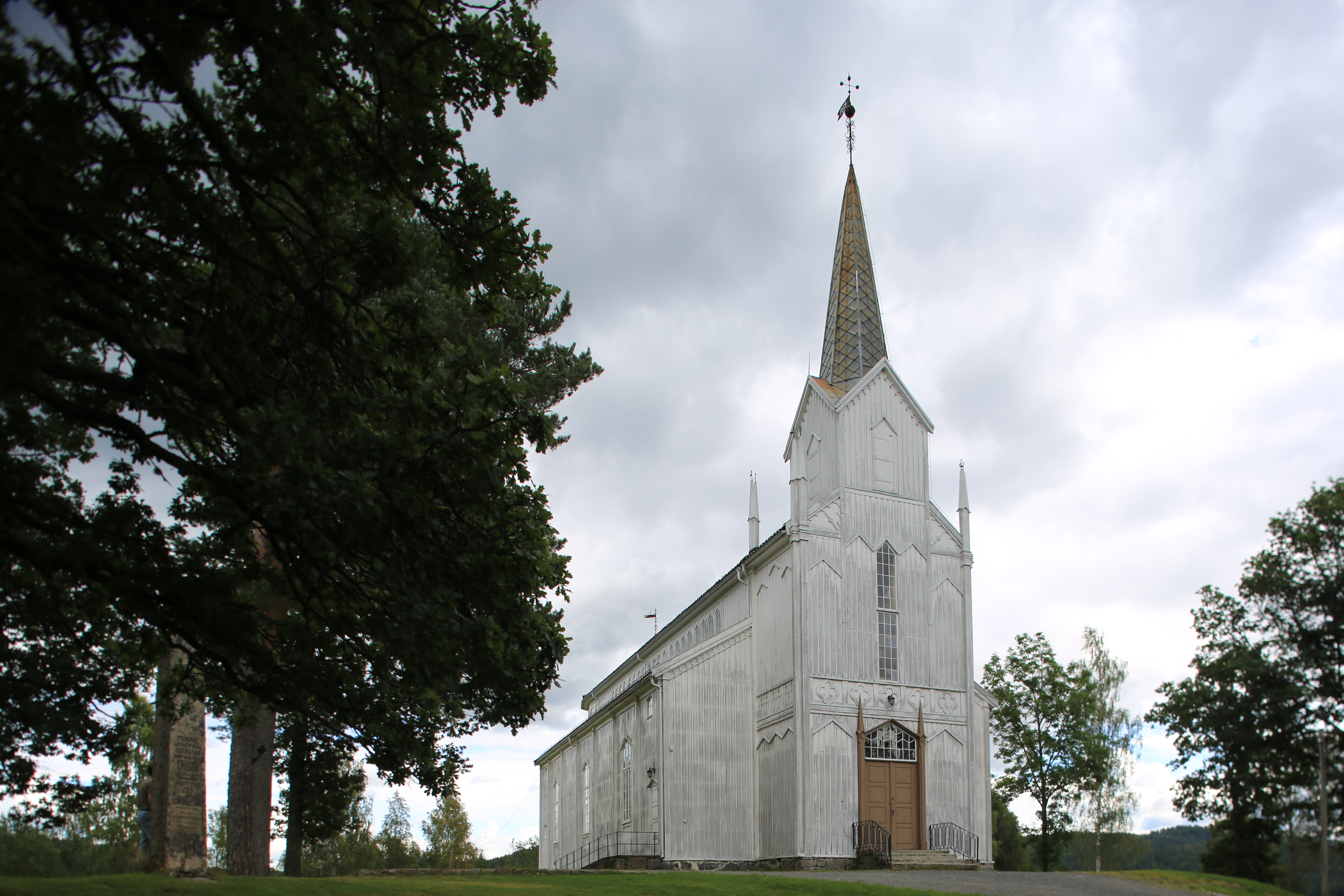
Gjerstad Church

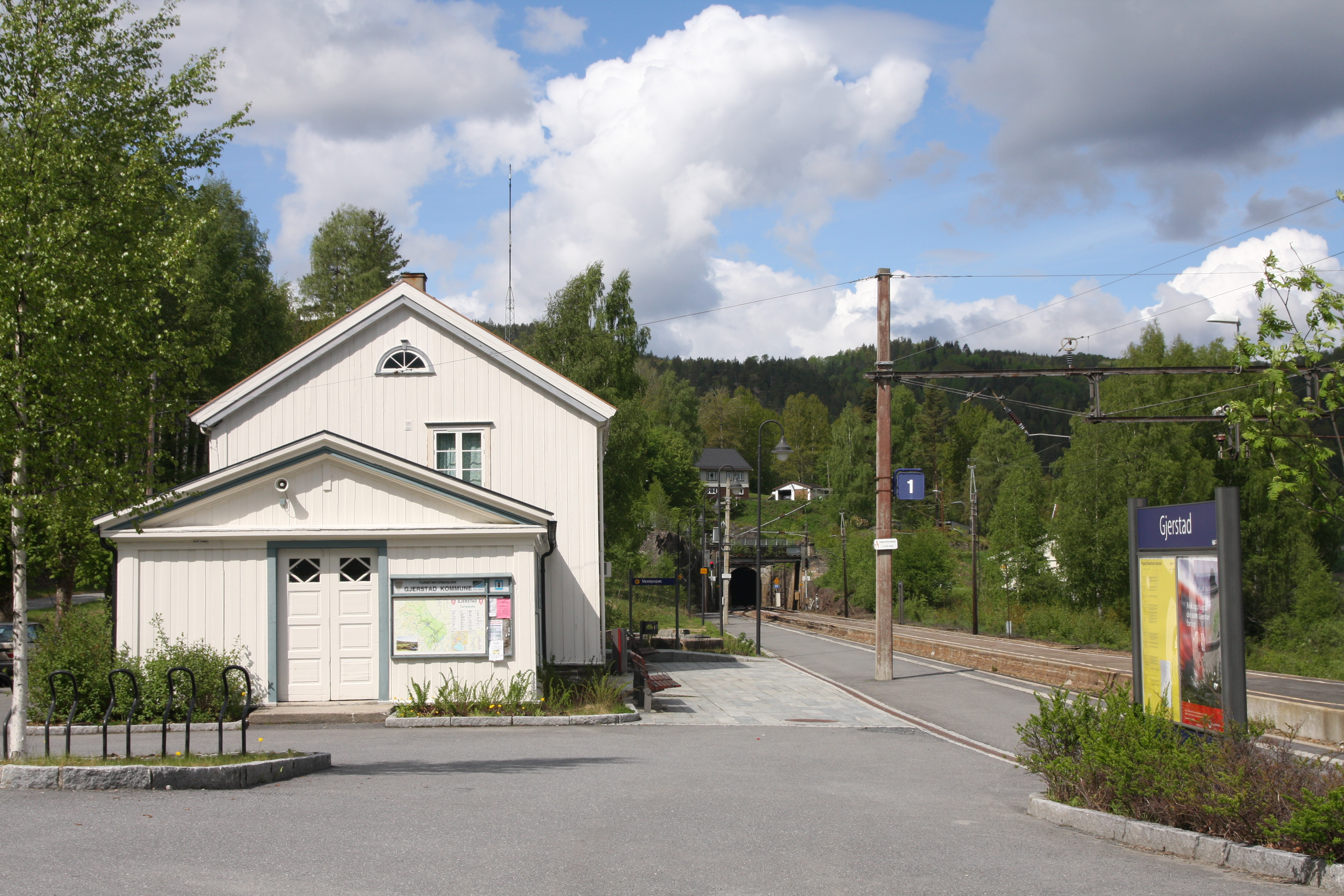
Gjerstad Station

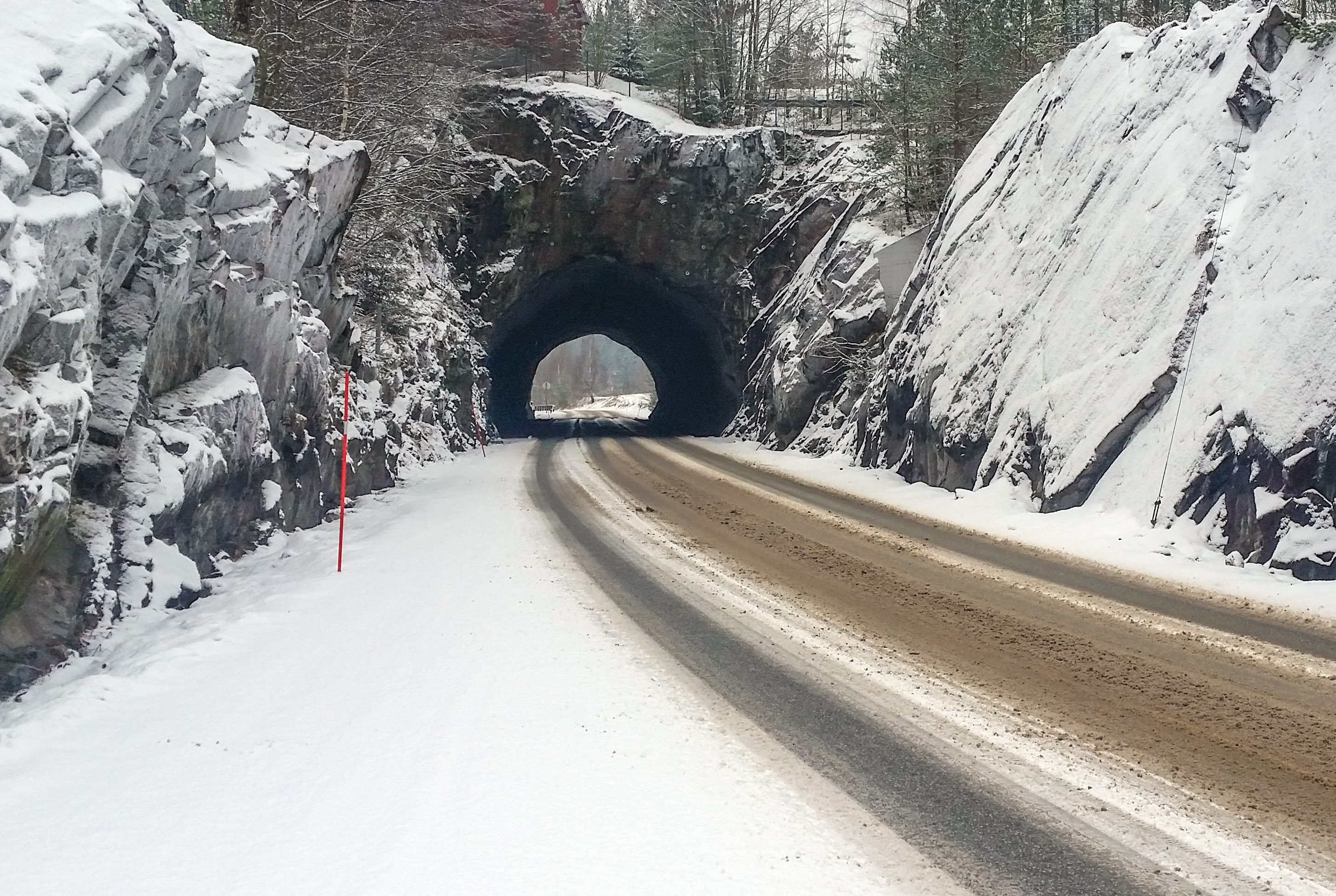
Tunnel leading into the village
