= Barmen (disambiguation) =

Barmen may refer to:

== People ==
- Kristoffer Barmen, a Norwegian professional footballer who plays for Brann

== Places ==
- Barmen, a municipal subdivision of the German city of Wuppertal
- Barmen or Barmøya, an island in Stad municipality in Vestland county, Norway
- Barmen, Agder, an island in Risør municipality in Agder county, Norway
- Gross Barmen, a settlement in Namibia

== Other ==
- 118173 Barmen, a main-belt asteroid
- Barmen Declaration, a statement of the Confessing Church opposing the Nazi-supported "German-Christian" movement
- SSV Barmen, a German association football club from Barmen in the city of Wuppertal
- Barmen lace machine
- Plural form of barman

== See also ==
- Barman (disambiguation)
