= Nordfjorden =

Nordfjorden or Nordfjord (meaning "Northern Fjord" in Norwegian) may refer to:

== Regions ==
- Nordfjord, a traditional district making up the northern third of Sogn og Fjordane county, Norway

== Fjords ==
- Nordfjorden (Agder), a fjord in Risør municipality, Agder county, Norway
- Nordfjord (Greenland), a fjord in the NE Greenland National Park area in East Greenland
- Nordfjorden (Svalbard), a fjord arm off the main Isfjorden in Svalbard, Norway
- Nordfjorden (Vestland), a large fjord in the northern part of Vestland county, Norway

== Villages ==
- Nordfjord, Finnmark, an abandoned village in Båtsfjord municipality, Finnmark county, Norway
