= Barman (disambiguation) =

A barman or bartender is someone who serves beverages behind a bar.

Barman may also refer to:

- Barman (surname)
- Burman, an Indian surname
- Barman language, a Tibeto-Burman language of India
  - Barmans in Cachar, Barman people in the Cachar district of Assam, India
- Barman (Madhya Pradesh), India
- ST Barman, a tugboat

== See also ==
- Barmen (disambiguation)
- Burma (disambiguation)
- Barma (disambiguation)
- Varman (disambiguation)
- Debbarma, an Indian (Tripuri) surname
- Debbarma dialect, a dialect of the Tripuri/Kokborok language
