= Meanings of minor-planet names: 118001–119000 =

As minor planet discoveries are confirmed, they are given a permanent number by the IAU's Minor Planet Center (MPC), and the discoverers can then submit names for them, following the IAU's naming conventions. The list below concerns those minor planets in the specified number-range that have received names, and explains the meanings of those names.

Official naming citations of newly named small Solar System bodies are approved and published in a bulletin by IAU's Working Group for Small Bodies Nomenclature (WGSBN). Before May 2021, citations were published in MPC's Minor Planet Circulars for many decades. Recent citations can also be found on the JPL Small-Body Database (SBDB). Until his death in 2016, German astronomer Lutz D. Schmadel compiled these citations into the Dictionary of Minor Planet Names (DMP) and regularly updated the collection.

Based on Paul Herget's The Names of the Minor Planets, Schmadel also researched the unclear origin of numerous asteroids, most of which had been named prior to World War II. This article incorporates text from this source, which is in the public domain: SBDB New namings may only be added to this list below after official publication as the preannouncement of names is condemned. The WGSBN publishes a comprehensive guideline for the naming rules of non-cometary small Solar System bodies.

== 118001–118100 ==
Named minor planet	Provisional	This minor planet was named for...	Ref; Catalog
There are no named minor planets in this number range

== 118101–118200 ==
back to top

Named minor planet	Provisional	This minor planet was named for...	Ref; Catalog
118102 Rinjani	2254 T-3	Rinjani, the 3726-m active volcano situated in Indonesia on the island of Lombok.	JPL · 118102
118172 Vorgebirge	1989 GU_{6}	Vorgebirge (Rheinland) a foothills located west of the Rhine. The long ridge extends from Bonn to Cologne	JPL · 118172
118173 Barmen	1991 GZ_{10}	The German city of Barmen (now incorporated into Wuppertal), whence the 1934 Synod issued the Barmen Declaration defining Protestant opposition to the National-Socialist ideology	JPL · 118173
118178 Rinckart	1992 SJ_{26}	Martin Rinckart (1586–1649), a German author, composer, and theologian, who wrote the ecumenical hymn Nun danket alle Gott ("Now thank we all our God")	JPL · 118178
118194 Sabinagarroni	1994 SG	Sabina Garroni (born 1972), Italian amateur astronomer	JPL · 118194

== 118201–118300 ==
back to top

Named minor planet	Provisional	This minor planet was named for...	Ref; Catalog
118214 Agnesediboemia	1996 AG_{1}	Agnese di Boemia (1211–1282), princess Anezka of the Premyslid family	JPL · 118214
118230 Sado	1996 WY_{2}	Sado island, in the Sea of Japan, the place where Noh drama (one of the "World's Intangible Cultural Treasures") was born	JPL · 118230
118233 Gfrancoferrini	1997 BX_{6}	Gianfranco Ferrini (born 1962), an Italian amateur astronomer and member of the astrometry team at Beppe Forti Astronomical Observatory (K83) in Montelupo Fiorentino, Tuscany.	IAU · 118233
118235 Federico	1997 ES_{7}	Federico Colombini (born 1989) an Italian software engineer at the University of Modena and Reggio Emilia, and nephew of amateur astronomer Ermes Colombini, who is one of the uncredited discoveries of this minor planet at the San Vittore Observatory.	IAU · 118235

== 118301–118400 ==
back to top

Named minor planet	Provisional	This minor planet was named for...	Ref; Catalog
There are no named minor planets in this number range

== 118401–118500 ==
back to top

Named minor planet	Provisional	This minor planet was named for...	Ref; Catalog
118401 LINEAR	1999 RE_{70}	Lincoln Near-Earth Asteroid Research (LINEAR), an astronomical survey which discovered numerous minor planets. This object is classified both as asteroid and comet (176P/LINEAR).	JPL · 118401
118418 Yangmei	1999 TP_{18}	The Central Academy of Fine Arts (Yangmei) is China's top institution of higher art education and a world-renowned art school. Since its establishment in 1918, CAFA has played a leading role in the development of Chinese art, as well as art education.	JPL · 118418

== 118501–118600 ==
back to top

Named minor planet	Provisional	This minor planet was named for...	Ref; Catalog
118554 Reedtimmer	2000 EM_{175}	Reed Timmer (born 1980) is an American meteorologist and avid storm chaser. Reed has a love of public outreach and education. He shoots intense videos of the most dangerous weather events on the planet while also gathering important data.	IAU · 118554

== 118601–118700 ==
back to top

Named minor planet	Provisional	This minor planet was named for...	Ref; Catalog
There are no named minor planets in this number range

== 118701–118800 ==
back to top

Named minor planet	Provisional	This minor planet was named for...	Ref; Catalog
118768 Carlosnoriega	2000 QY_{233}	Carlos I. Noriega was born in 1959 in Peru and became an astronaut in 1996. He was a mission specialist for both the Space Shuttle Atlantis mission that docked with the Mir Space Station and the Space Shuttle Endeavour mission to deliver and install solar arrays to the International Space Station.	JPL · 118768
118769 Olivas	2000 QJ_{249}	John D. Olivas (born 1966) is a former American astronaut. Olivas flew two Space Shuttle missions to assemble the International Space Station (in 2007 and 2009). He conducted five space walks during those two missions.	JPL · 118769

== 118801–118900 ==
back to top

Named minor planet	Provisional	This minor planet was named for...	Ref; Catalog
118829 Jindřichštreit	2000 SJ_{163}	Jindřich Štreit, one of the leading Czech documentary photographers, widely recognized in Europe and beyond.	IAU · 118829

== 118901–119000 ==
back to top

Named minor planet	Provisional	This minor planet was named for...	Ref; Catalog
118945 Rikhill	2000 WS_{68}	Richard E. Hill (born 1949), American amateur astronomer who turned professional, known for his outreach activities. He worked with the Catalina Sky Survey, searching for potentially hazardous objects, and is a discoverer of minor planets and several comets such as 195P/Hill.	JPL · 118945

back to top

Preceded by 117,001–118,000	Meanings of minor-planet names List of minor planets: 118,001–119,000	Succeeded by 119,001–120,000
