= Barma (surname) =

Barma is a surname. Notable people with the surname include:

- Aarif Barma (born 1959), Hong Kong judge, and a Justice of Appeal of the Court of Appeal of Hong Kong
- Catherine Barma (born 1945), French television producer
- Claude Barma (1918–1992), French-Italian director and screenwriter, and an early creator of French television programmes
- Ivan Barma, Russian architect, probably one of the architects and builders of Saint Basil's Cathedral on Red Square in Moscow (built between 1555 and 1560).
- Lucie Barma, Canadian freestyle skier
- Mustansir Barma, Indian scientist specializing in Statistical Physics
- Panchanan Barma, Indian reformer
- Pradip Kumar Barma, Indian politician
- Haider Barma, former Hong Kong Secretary for Transport and Housing

== See also ==
- Barma (disambiguation)
