= Barma =

Barma may refer to:

- Barma, an autonym of the Bagirmi people of Chad
- Barma (crater), a crater on the planet Mercury

== People ==
- Barma (surname), surname
- Kocc Barma Fall (1586–1655), Senegalese philosopher

=== Fictional characters ===
- Parashor Barma, a fictional detective character of Bengali writer Premendra Mitra

== See also ==
- Barman (disambiguation)
- Burma (disambiguation)
- Varma (disambiguation)
