= List of minor planets: 118001–119000 =

The following is a partial list of minor planets, running from minor-planet number 118001 through 119000, inclusive. The primary data for this and other partial lists is based on JPL's "Small-Body Orbital Elements" and data available from the Minor Planet Center. Critical list information is also provided by the MPC, unless otherwise specified from Lowell Observatory. A detailed description of the table's columns and additional sources are given on the main page including a complete list of every page in this series, and a statistical break-up on the dynamical classification of minor planets.

Also see the summary list of all named bodies in numerical and alphabetical order, and the corresponding naming citations for the number range of this particular list. New namings may only be added to this list after official publication, as the preannouncement of names is condemned by the Working Group for Small Bodies Nomenclature of the International Astronomical Union.

Near-Earth obj.	MBA (inner)	MBA (outer)	Centaur
Mars-crosser	MBA (middle)	Jupiter trojan	Trans-Neptunian obj.
Unclassified

== 118001–118100 ==
Designation			Discovery			Properties		Ref
Permanent	Provisional	Named after	Date	Site	Discoverer(s)	Category	Diam.	Ref
118001	1147 T-2	—	September 29, 1973	Palomar	C. J. van Houten, I. van Houten-Groeneveld, T. Gehrels	·	2.2 km	MPC · JPL
118002	1172 T-2	—	September 29, 1973	Palomar	C. J. van Houten, I. van Houten-Groeneveld, T. Gehrels	·	3.3 km	MPC · JPL
118003	1190 T-2	—	September 29, 1973	Palomar	C. J. van Houten, I. van Houten-Groeneveld, T. Gehrels	NYS	2.0 km	MPC · JPL
118004	1192 T-2	—	September 29, 1973	Palomar	C. J. van Houten, I. van Houten-Groeneveld, T. Gehrels	·	5.1 km	MPC · JPL
118005	1214 T-2	—	September 30, 1973	Palomar	C. J. van Houten, I. van Houten-Groeneveld, T. Gehrels	·	4.0 km	MPC · JPL
118006	1252 T-2	—	September 29, 1973	Palomar	C. J. van Houten, I. van Houten-Groeneveld, T. Gehrels	·	2.3 km	MPC · JPL
118007	1256 T-2	—	September 29, 1973	Palomar	C. J. van Houten, I. van Houten-Groeneveld, T. Gehrels	·	2.1 km	MPC · JPL
118008	1257 T-2	—	September 29, 1973	Palomar	C. J. van Houten, I. van Houten-Groeneveld, T. Gehrels	·	3.4 km	MPC · JPL
118009	1271 T-2	—	September 29, 1973	Palomar	C. J. van Houten, I. van Houten-Groeneveld, T. Gehrels	MAS	1.5 km	MPC · JPL
118010	1272 T-2	—	September 29, 1973	Palomar	C. J. van Houten, I. van Houten-Groeneveld, T. Gehrels	·	2.6 km	MPC · JPL
118011	1289 T-2	—	September 29, 1973	Palomar	C. J. van Houten, I. van Houten-Groeneveld, T. Gehrels	NYS	1.8 km	MPC · JPL
118012	1313 T-2	—	September 29, 1973	Palomar	C. J. van Houten, I. van Houten-Groeneveld, T. Gehrels	·	2.3 km	MPC · JPL
118013	1338 T-2	—	September 29, 1973	Palomar	C. J. van Houten, I. van Houten-Groeneveld, T. Gehrels	·	4.7 km	MPC · JPL
118014	1342 T-2	—	September 29, 1973	Palomar	C. J. van Houten, I. van Houten-Groeneveld, T. Gehrels	·	1.9 km	MPC · JPL
118015	1430 T-2	—	September 30, 1973	Palomar	C. J. van Houten, I. van Houten-Groeneveld, T. Gehrels	THM	5.1 km	MPC · JPL
118016	1437 T-2	—	September 30, 1973	Palomar	C. J. van Houten, I. van Houten-Groeneveld, T. Gehrels	·	5.8 km	MPC · JPL
118017	1448 T-2	—	September 30, 1973	Palomar	C. J. van Houten, I. van Houten-Groeneveld, T. Gehrels	KOR	2.7 km	MPC · JPL
118018	1496 T-2	—	September 29, 1973	Palomar	C. J. van Houten, I. van Houten-Groeneveld, T. Gehrels	·	3.7 km	MPC · JPL
118019	1504 T-2	—	September 30, 1973	Palomar	C. J. van Houten, I. van Houten-Groeneveld, T. Gehrels	KOR	2.5 km	MPC · JPL
118020	1602 T-2	—	September 24, 1973	Palomar	C. J. van Houten, I. van Houten-Groeneveld, T. Gehrels	HYG	6.5 km	MPC · JPL
118021	2035 T-2	—	September 29, 1973	Palomar	C. J. van Houten, I. van Houten-Groeneveld, T. Gehrels	·	1.5 km	MPC · JPL
118022	2055 T-2	—	September 29, 1973	Palomar	C. J. van Houten, I. van Houten-Groeneveld, T. Gehrels	·	5.1 km	MPC · JPL
118023	2103 T-2	—	September 29, 1973	Palomar	C. J. van Houten, I. van Houten-Groeneveld, T. Gehrels	·	1.4 km	MPC · JPL
118024	2110 T-2	—	September 29, 1973	Palomar	C. J. van Houten, I. van Houten-Groeneveld, T. Gehrels	EMA	7.0 km	MPC · JPL
118025	2121 T-2	—	September 29, 1973	Palomar	C. J. van Houten, I. van Houten-Groeneveld, T. Gehrels	·	1.3 km	MPC · JPL
118026	2151 T-2	—	September 29, 1973	Palomar	C. J. van Houten, I. van Houten-Groeneveld, T. Gehrels	·	6.1 km	MPC · JPL
118027	2161 T-2	—	September 29, 1973	Palomar	C. J. van Houten, I. van Houten-Groeneveld, T. Gehrels	·	5.6 km	MPC · JPL
118028	2283 T-2	—	September 29, 1973	Palomar	C. J. van Houten, I. van Houten-Groeneveld, T. Gehrels	·	1.1 km	MPC · JPL
118029	2295 T-2	—	September 29, 1973	Palomar	C. J. van Houten, I. van Houten-Groeneveld, T. Gehrels	·	950 m	MPC · JPL
118030	2325 T-2	—	September 29, 1973	Palomar	C. J. van Houten, I. van Houten-Groeneveld, T. Gehrels	·	2.3 km	MPC · JPL
118031	2330 T-2	—	September 30, 1973	Palomar	C. J. van Houten, I. van Houten-Groeneveld, T. Gehrels	·	3.0 km	MPC · JPL
118032	2410 T-2	—	September 25, 1973	Palomar	C. J. van Houten, I. van Houten-Groeneveld, T. Gehrels	·	2.0 km	MPC · JPL
118033	2904 T-2	—	September 30, 1973	Palomar	C. J. van Houten, I. van Houten-Groeneveld, T. Gehrels	·	5.6 km	MPC · JPL
118034	3015 T-2	—	September 30, 1973	Palomar	C. J. van Houten, I. van Houten-Groeneveld, T. Gehrels	(43176)	5.0 km	MPC · JPL
118035	3031 T-2	—	September 30, 1973	Palomar	C. J. van Houten, I. van Houten-Groeneveld, T. Gehrels	·	3.4 km	MPC · JPL
118036	3038 T-2	—	September 30, 1973	Palomar	C. J. van Houten, I. van Houten-Groeneveld, T. Gehrels	·	7.1 km	MPC · JPL
118037	3041 T-2	—	September 30, 1973	Palomar	C. J. van Houten, I. van Houten-Groeneveld, T. Gehrels	·	7.0 km	MPC · JPL
118038	3051 T-2	—	September 30, 1973	Palomar	C. J. van Houten, I. van Houten-Groeneveld, T. Gehrels	·	2.6 km	MPC · JPL
118039	3075 T-2	—	September 30, 1973	Palomar	C. J. van Houten, I. van Houten-Groeneveld, T. Gehrels	·	2.1 km	MPC · JPL
118040	3104 T-2	—	September 30, 1973	Palomar	C. J. van Houten, I. van Houten-Groeneveld, T. Gehrels	KOR	3.0 km	MPC · JPL
118041	3179 T-2	—	September 30, 1973	Palomar	C. J. van Houten, I. van Houten-Groeneveld, T. Gehrels	·	1.5 km	MPC · JPL
118042	3204 T-2	—	September 30, 1973	Palomar	C. J. van Houten, I. van Houten-Groeneveld, T. Gehrels	·	5.8 km	MPC · JPL
118043	3220 T-2	—	September 30, 1973	Palomar	C. J. van Houten, I. van Houten-Groeneveld, T. Gehrels	·	2.8 km	MPC · JPL
118044	3224 T-2	—	September 30, 1973	Palomar	C. J. van Houten, I. van Houten-Groeneveld, T. Gehrels	·	4.1 km	MPC · JPL
118045	3258 T-2	—	September 30, 1973	Palomar	C. J. van Houten, I. van Houten-Groeneveld, T. Gehrels	·	8.9 km	MPC · JPL
118046	3259 T-2	—	September 30, 1973	Palomar	C. J. van Houten, I. van Houten-Groeneveld, T. Gehrels	·	5.8 km	MPC · JPL
118047	3306 T-2	—	September 30, 1973	Palomar	C. J. van Houten, I. van Houten-Groeneveld, T. Gehrels	·	3.5 km	MPC · JPL
118048	3311 T-2	—	September 30, 1973	Palomar	C. J. van Houten, I. van Houten-Groeneveld, T. Gehrels	·	1.3 km	MPC · JPL
118049	4066 T-2	—	September 29, 1973	Palomar	C. J. van Houten, I. van Houten-Groeneveld, T. Gehrels	·	1.2 km	MPC · JPL
118050	4073 T-2	—	September 29, 1973	Palomar	C. J. van Houten, I. van Houten-Groeneveld, T. Gehrels	·	5.3 km	MPC · JPL
118051	4102 T-2	—	September 29, 1973	Palomar	C. J. van Houten, I. van Houten-Groeneveld, T. Gehrels	·	2.0 km	MPC · JPL
118052	4105 T-2	—	September 29, 1973	Palomar	C. J. van Houten, I. van Houten-Groeneveld, T. Gehrels	·	3.3 km	MPC · JPL
118053	4106 T-2	—	September 29, 1973	Palomar	C. J. van Houten, I. van Houten-Groeneveld, T. Gehrels	·	5.1 km	MPC · JPL
118054	4123 T-2	—	September 29, 1973	Palomar	C. J. van Houten, I. van Houten-Groeneveld, T. Gehrels	·	2.2 km	MPC · JPL
118055	4124 T-2	—	September 29, 1973	Palomar	C. J. van Houten, I. van Houten-Groeneveld, T. Gehrels	·	4.5 km	MPC · JPL
118056	4126 T-2	—	September 29, 1973	Palomar	C. J. van Houten, I. van Houten-Groeneveld, T. Gehrels	·	3.0 km	MPC · JPL
118057	4163 T-2	—	September 29, 1973	Palomar	C. J. van Houten, I. van Houten-Groeneveld, T. Gehrels	·	4.1 km	MPC · JPL
118058	4175 T-2	—	September 29, 1973	Palomar	C. J. van Houten, I. van Houten-Groeneveld, T. Gehrels	·	1.5 km	MPC · JPL
118059	4206 T-2	—	September 29, 1973	Palomar	C. J. van Houten, I. van Houten-Groeneveld, T. Gehrels	EMA	7.1 km	MPC · JPL
118060	4213 T-2	—	September 29, 1973	Palomar	C. J. van Houten, I. van Houten-Groeneveld, T. Gehrels	MAS	1.3 km	MPC · JPL
118061	4249 T-2	—	September 29, 1973	Palomar	C. J. van Houten, I. van Houten-Groeneveld, T. Gehrels	·	1.8 km	MPC · JPL
118062	4256 T-2	—	September 29, 1973	Palomar	C. J. van Houten, I. van Houten-Groeneveld, T. Gehrels	EOS	3.9 km	MPC · JPL
118063	4259 T-2	—	September 29, 1973	Palomar	C. J. van Houten, I. van Houten-Groeneveld, T. Gehrels	·	1.6 km	MPC · JPL
118064	4292 T-2	—	September 29, 1973	Palomar	C. J. van Houten, I. van Houten-Groeneveld, T. Gehrels	·	3.5 km	MPC · JPL
118065	4302 T-2	—	September 29, 1973	Palomar	C. J. van Houten, I. van Houten-Groeneveld, T. Gehrels	MAS	1.6 km	MPC · JPL
118066	4317 T-2	—	September 29, 1973	Palomar	C. J. van Houten, I. van Houten-Groeneveld, T. Gehrels	NYS	2.3 km	MPC · JPL
118067	4648 T-2	—	September 30, 1973	Palomar	C. J. van Houten, I. van Houten-Groeneveld, T. Gehrels	·	3.0 km	MPC · JPL
118068	5011 T-2	—	September 25, 1973	Palomar	C. J. van Houten, I. van Houten-Groeneveld, T. Gehrels	·	3.6 km	MPC · JPL
118069	5022 T-2	—	September 25, 1973	Palomar	C. J. van Houten, I. van Houten-Groeneveld, T. Gehrels	·	3.3 km	MPC · JPL
118070	5060 T-2	—	September 25, 1973	Palomar	C. J. van Houten, I. van Houten-Groeneveld, T. Gehrels	V	1.3 km	MPC · JPL
118071	5062 T-2	—	September 25, 1973	Palomar	C. J. van Houten, I. van Houten-Groeneveld, T. Gehrels	·	2.1 km	MPC · JPL
118072	5076 T-2	—	September 25, 1973	Palomar	C. J. van Houten, I. van Houten-Groeneveld, T. Gehrels	·	2.6 km	MPC · JPL
118073	5077 T-2	—	September 25, 1973	Palomar	C. J. van Houten, I. van Houten-Groeneveld, T. Gehrels	·	2.4 km	MPC · JPL
118074	5078 T-2	—	September 25, 1973	Palomar	C. J. van Houten, I. van Houten-Groeneveld, T. Gehrels	·	3.5 km	MPC · JPL
118075	5082 T-2	—	September 25, 1973	Palomar	C. J. van Houten, I. van Houten-Groeneveld, T. Gehrels	·	5.6 km	MPC · JPL
118076	5100 T-2	—	September 25, 1973	Palomar	C. J. van Houten, I. van Houten-Groeneveld, T. Gehrels	·	4.1 km	MPC · JPL
118077	5165 T-2	—	September 25, 1973	Palomar	C. J. van Houten, I. van Houten-Groeneveld, T. Gehrels	·	4.7 km	MPC · JPL
118078	5174 T-2	—	September 25, 1973	Palomar	C. J. van Houten, I. van Houten-Groeneveld, T. Gehrels	·	3.4 km	MPC · JPL
118079	5189 T-2	—	September 25, 1973	Palomar	C. J. van Houten, I. van Houten-Groeneveld, T. Gehrels	·	3.6 km	MPC · JPL
118080	5197 T-2	—	September 25, 1973	Palomar	C. J. van Houten, I. van Houten-Groeneveld, T. Gehrels	EOS	3.4 km	MPC · JPL
118081	5206 T-2	—	September 25, 1973	Palomar	C. J. van Houten, I. van Houten-Groeneveld, T. Gehrels	·	7.0 km	MPC · JPL
118082	5207 T-2	—	September 25, 1973	Palomar	C. J. van Houten, I. van Houten-Groeneveld, T. Gehrels	·	2.7 km	MPC · JPL
118083	5215 T-2	—	September 25, 1973	Palomar	C. J. van Houten, I. van Houten-Groeneveld, T. Gehrels	·	5.2 km	MPC · JPL
118084	5340 T-2	—	September 25, 1973	Palomar	C. J. van Houten, I. van Houten-Groeneveld, T. Gehrels	EOS	3.7 km	MPC · JPL
118085	1019 T-3	—	October 17, 1977	Palomar	C. J. van Houten, I. van Houten-Groeneveld, T. Gehrels	·	11 km	MPC · JPL
118086	1037 T-3	—	October 17, 1977	Palomar	C. J. van Houten, I. van Houten-Groeneveld, T. Gehrels	V	1.4 km	MPC · JPL
118087	1043 T-3	—	October 17, 1977	Palomar	C. J. van Houten, I. van Houten-Groeneveld, T. Gehrels	·	7.7 km	MPC · JPL
118088	1090 T-3	—	October 17, 1977	Palomar	C. J. van Houten, I. van Houten-Groeneveld, T. Gehrels	EUN	1.8 km	MPC · JPL
118089	1093 T-3	—	October 17, 1977	Palomar	C. J. van Houten, I. van Houten-Groeneveld, T. Gehrels	·	2.9 km	MPC · JPL
118090	1105 T-3	—	October 17, 1977	Palomar	C. J. van Houten, I. van Houten-Groeneveld, T. Gehrels	EUN	2.1 km	MPC · JPL
118091	1124 T-3	—	October 17, 1977	Palomar	C. J. van Houten, I. van Houten-Groeneveld, T. Gehrels	·	3.0 km	MPC · JPL
118092	1150 T-3	—	October 17, 1977	Palomar	C. J. van Houten, I. van Houten-Groeneveld, T. Gehrels	·	1.7 km	MPC · JPL
118093	1163 T-3	—	October 17, 1977	Palomar	C. J. van Houten, I. van Houten-Groeneveld, T. Gehrels	·	8.3 km	MPC · JPL
118094	1852 T-3	—	October 17, 1977	Palomar	C. J. van Houten, I. van Houten-Groeneveld, T. Gehrels	·	6.7 km	MPC · JPL
118095	2007 T-3	—	October 16, 1977	Palomar	C. J. van Houten, I. van Houten-Groeneveld, T. Gehrels	(5)	2.7 km	MPC · JPL
118096	2125 T-3	—	October 16, 1977	Palomar	C. J. van Houten, I. van Houten-Groeneveld, T. Gehrels	V	1.0 km	MPC · JPL
118097	2148 T-3	—	October 16, 1977	Palomar	C. J. van Houten, I. van Houten-Groeneveld, T. Gehrels	·	3.6 km	MPC · JPL
118098	2171 T-3	—	October 16, 1977	Palomar	C. J. van Houten, I. van Houten-Groeneveld, T. Gehrels	·	1.6 km	MPC · JPL
118099	2210 T-3	—	October 16, 1977	Palomar	C. J. van Houten, I. van Houten-Groeneveld, T. Gehrels	·	1.7 km	MPC · JPL
118100	2224 T-3	—	October 16, 1977	Palomar	C. J. van Houten, I. van Houten-Groeneveld, T. Gehrels	·	2.4 km	MPC · JPL

== 118101–118200 ==
back to top

Designation			Discovery			Properties		Ref
Permanent	Provisional	Named after	Date	Site	Discoverer(s)	Category	Diam.	Ref
118101	2228 T-3	—	October 16, 1977	Palomar	C. J. van Houten, I. van Houten-Groeneveld, T. Gehrels	V	1.0 km	MPC · JPL
118102 Rinjani	2254 T-3	Rinjani	October 16, 1977	Palomar	C. J. van Houten, I. van Houten-Groeneveld, T. Gehrels	H	1.2 km	MPC · JPL
118103	2279 T-3	—	October 16, 1977	Palomar	C. J. van Houten, I. van Houten-Groeneveld, T. Gehrels	EOS	3.4 km	MPC · JPL
118104	2294 T-3	—	October 16, 1977	Palomar	C. J. van Houten, I. van Houten-Groeneveld, T. Gehrels	(5)	2.2 km	MPC · JPL
118105	2309 T-3	—	October 16, 1977	Palomar	C. J. van Houten, I. van Houten-Groeneveld, T. Gehrels	·	2.2 km	MPC · JPL
118106	2343 T-3	—	October 16, 1977	Palomar	C. J. van Houten, I. van Houten-Groeneveld, T. Gehrels	KOR	2.7 km	MPC · JPL
118107	2361 T-3	—	October 16, 1977	Palomar	C. J. van Houten, I. van Houten-Groeneveld, T. Gehrels	·	5.4 km	MPC · JPL
118108	2398 T-3	—	October 16, 1977	Palomar	C. J. van Houten, I. van Houten-Groeneveld, T. Gehrels	·	1.7 km	MPC · JPL
118109	2445 T-3	—	October 16, 1977	Palomar	C. J. van Houten, I. van Houten-Groeneveld, T. Gehrels	URS	8.2 km	MPC · JPL
118110	2493 T-3	—	October 16, 1977	Palomar	C. J. van Houten, I. van Houten-Groeneveld, T. Gehrels	·	2.4 km	MPC · JPL
118111	2633 T-3	—	October 16, 1977	Palomar	C. J. van Houten, I. van Houten-Groeneveld, T. Gehrels	·	2.0 km	MPC · JPL
118112	2665 T-3	—	October 11, 1977	Palomar	C. J. van Houten, I. van Houten-Groeneveld, T. Gehrels	·	1.1 km	MPC · JPL
118113	3091 T-3	—	October 16, 1977	Palomar	C. J. van Houten, I. van Houten-Groeneveld, T. Gehrels	·	1.8 km	MPC · JPL
118114	3117 T-3	—	October 16, 1977	Palomar	C. J. van Houten, I. van Houten-Groeneveld, T. Gehrels	MAS	1.0 km	MPC · JPL
118115	3118 T-3	—	October 16, 1977	Palomar	C. J. van Houten, I. van Houten-Groeneveld, T. Gehrels	(5)	2.0 km	MPC · JPL
118116	3161 T-3	—	October 16, 1977	Palomar	C. J. van Houten, I. van Houten-Groeneveld, T. Gehrels	MAS	1.8 km	MPC · JPL
118117	3168 T-3	—	October 16, 1977	Palomar	C. J. van Houten, I. van Houten-Groeneveld, T. Gehrels	·	1.6 km	MPC · JPL
118118	3169 T-3	—	October 16, 1977	Palomar	C. J. van Houten, I. van Houten-Groeneveld, T. Gehrels	·	1.3 km	MPC · JPL
118119	3177 T-3	—	October 16, 1977	Palomar	C. J. van Houten, I. van Houten-Groeneveld, T. Gehrels	DOR	3.9 km	MPC · JPL
118120	3181 T-3	—	October 16, 1977	Palomar	C. J. van Houten, I. van Houten-Groeneveld, T. Gehrels	·	6.4 km	MPC · JPL
118121	3211 T-3	—	October 16, 1977	Palomar	C. J. van Houten, I. van Houten-Groeneveld, T. Gehrels	·	2.4 km	MPC · JPL
118122	3228 T-3	—	October 16, 1977	Palomar	C. J. van Houten, I. van Houten-Groeneveld, T. Gehrels	(5)	2.4 km	MPC · JPL
118123	3238 T-3	—	October 16, 1977	Palomar	C. J. van Houten, I. van Houten-Groeneveld, T. Gehrels	·	4.2 km	MPC · JPL
118124	3253 T-3	—	October 16, 1977	Palomar	C. J. van Houten, I. van Houten-Groeneveld, T. Gehrels	·	1.6 km	MPC · JPL
118125	3278 T-3	—	October 16, 1977	Palomar	C. J. van Houten, I. van Houten-Groeneveld, T. Gehrels	·	6.0 km	MPC · JPL
118126	3344 T-3	—	October 16, 1977	Palomar	C. J. van Houten, I. van Houten-Groeneveld, T. Gehrels	·	2.4 km	MPC · JPL
118127	3399 T-3	—	October 16, 1977	Palomar	C. J. van Houten, I. van Houten-Groeneveld, T. Gehrels	·	1.4 km	MPC · JPL
118128	3457 T-3	—	October 16, 1977	Palomar	C. J. van Houten, I. van Houten-Groeneveld, T. Gehrels	NYS	1.9 km	MPC · JPL
118129	3459 T-3	—	October 16, 1977	Palomar	C. J. van Houten, I. van Houten-Groeneveld, T. Gehrels	·	1.0 km	MPC · JPL
118130	3469 T-3	—	October 16, 1977	Palomar	C. J. van Houten, I. van Houten-Groeneveld, T. Gehrels	·	3.4 km	MPC · JPL
118131	3501 T-3	—	October 16, 1977	Palomar	C. J. van Houten, I. van Houten-Groeneveld, T. Gehrels	·	2.2 km	MPC · JPL
118132	3505 T-3	—	October 16, 1977	Palomar	C. J. van Houten, I. van Houten-Groeneveld, T. Gehrels	·	2.2 km	MPC · JPL
118133	3523 T-3	—	October 16, 1977	Palomar	C. J. van Houten, I. van Houten-Groeneveld, T. Gehrels	THM	3.9 km	MPC · JPL
118134	3533 T-3	—	October 16, 1977	Palomar	C. J. van Houten, I. van Houten-Groeneveld, T. Gehrels	·	2.0 km	MPC · JPL
118135	3559 T-3	—	October 16, 1977	Palomar	C. J. van Houten, I. van Houten-Groeneveld, T. Gehrels	MAS	1 km	MPC · JPL
118136	3756 T-3	—	October 16, 1977	Palomar	C. J. van Houten, I. van Houten-Groeneveld, T. Gehrels	·	2.1 km	MPC · JPL
118137	3813 T-3	—	October 16, 1977	Palomar	C. J. van Houten, I. van Houten-Groeneveld, T. Gehrels	·	1.4 km	MPC · JPL
118138	4036 T-3	—	October 16, 1977	Palomar	C. J. van Houten, I. van Houten-Groeneveld, T. Gehrels	HYG	4.6 km	MPC · JPL
118139	4041 T-3	—	October 16, 1977	Palomar	C. J. van Houten, I. van Houten-Groeneveld, T. Gehrels	·	3.7 km	MPC · JPL
118140	4042 T-3	—	October 16, 1977	Palomar	C. J. van Houten, I. van Houten-Groeneveld, T. Gehrels	·	3.0 km	MPC · JPL
118141	4048 T-3	—	October 16, 1977	Palomar	C. J. van Houten, I. van Houten-Groeneveld, T. Gehrels	·	4.1 km	MPC · JPL
118142	4117 T-3	—	October 16, 1977	Palomar	C. J. van Houten, I. van Houten-Groeneveld, T. Gehrels	AGN	2.3 km	MPC · JPL
118143	4124 T-3	—	October 16, 1977	Palomar	C. J. van Houten, I. van Houten-Groeneveld, T. Gehrels	KOR	3.0 km	MPC · JPL
118144	4136 T-3	—	October 16, 1977	Palomar	C. J. van Houten, I. van Houten-Groeneveld, T. Gehrels	·	1.4 km	MPC · JPL
118145	4142 T-3	—	October 16, 1977	Palomar	C. J. van Houten, I. van Houten-Groeneveld, T. Gehrels	V	1.4 km	MPC · JPL
118146	4161 T-3	—	October 16, 1977	Palomar	C. J. van Houten, I. van Houten-Groeneveld, T. Gehrels	·	2.3 km	MPC · JPL
118147	4183 T-3	—	October 16, 1977	Palomar	C. J. van Houten, I. van Houten-Groeneveld, T. Gehrels	·	1.3 km	MPC · JPL
118148	4204 T-3	—	October 16, 1977	Palomar	C. J. van Houten, I. van Houten-Groeneveld, T. Gehrels	·	1.6 km	MPC · JPL
118149	4298 T-3	—	October 16, 1977	Palomar	C. J. van Houten, I. van Houten-Groeneveld, T. Gehrels	·	4.3 km	MPC · JPL
118150	4325 T-3	—	October 16, 1977	Palomar	C. J. van Houten, I. van Houten-Groeneveld, T. Gehrels	·	2.2 km	MPC · JPL
118151	4391 T-3	—	October 16, 1977	Palomar	C. J. van Houten, I. van Houten-Groeneveld, T. Gehrels	·	1.9 km	MPC · JPL
118152	5076 T-3	—	October 16, 1977	Palomar	C. J. van Houten, I. van Houten-Groeneveld, T. Gehrels	·	5.4 km	MPC · JPL
118153	5083 T-3	—	October 16, 1977	Palomar	C. J. van Houten, I. van Houten-Groeneveld, T. Gehrels	·	1.6 km	MPC · JPL
118154	5110 T-3	—	October 16, 1977	Palomar	C. J. van Houten, I. van Houten-Groeneveld, T. Gehrels	·	5.9 km	MPC · JPL
118155	5141 T-3	—	October 16, 1977	Palomar	C. J. van Houten, I. van Houten-Groeneveld, T. Gehrels	GEF	2.1 km	MPC · JPL
118156	5146 T-3	—	October 16, 1977	Palomar	C. J. van Houten, I. van Houten-Groeneveld, T. Gehrels	HNS	2.1 km	MPC · JPL
118157	5157 T-3	—	October 16, 1977	Palomar	C. J. van Houten, I. van Houten-Groeneveld, T. Gehrels	·	3.0 km	MPC · JPL
118158	5161 T-3	—	October 16, 1977	Palomar	C. J. van Houten, I. van Houten-Groeneveld, T. Gehrels	·	4.3 km	MPC · JPL
118159	5162 T-3	—	October 16, 1977	Palomar	C. J. van Houten, I. van Houten-Groeneveld, T. Gehrels	PHO	4.3 km	MPC · JPL
118160	5646 T-3	—	October 16, 1977	Palomar	C. J. van Houten, I. van Houten-Groeneveld, T. Gehrels	·	3.6 km	MPC · JPL
118161	5710 T-3	—	October 16, 1977	Palomar	C. J. van Houten, I. van Houten-Groeneveld, T. Gehrels	·	2.7 km	MPC · JPL
118162	1951 SX	—	September 29, 1951	Palomar	A. G. Wilson	·	1.4 km	MPC · JPL
118163	1979 MJ_{8}	—	June 25, 1979	Siding Spring	E. F. Helin, S. J. Bus	·	3.5 km	MPC · JPL
118164	1981 DC_{3}	—	February 28, 1981	Siding Spring	S. J. Bus	V	1.2 km	MPC · JPL
118165	1981 EH_{2}	—	March 2, 1981	Siding Spring	S. J. Bus	·	5.5 km	MPC · JPL
118166	1981 EG_{22}	—	March 2, 1981	Siding Spring	S. J. Bus	·	2.2 km	MPC · JPL
118167	1981 EJ_{30}	—	March 2, 1981	Siding Spring	S. J. Bus	·	1.6 km	MPC · JPL
118168	1981 EQ_{37}	—	March 1, 1981	Siding Spring	S. J. Bus	·	3.0 km	MPC · JPL
118169	1981 EL_{40}	—	March 2, 1981	Siding Spring	S. J. Bus	·	2.5 km	MPC · JPL
118170	1981 EV_{40}	—	March 2, 1981	Siding Spring	S. J. Bus	·	4.7 km	MPC · JPL
118171	1988 DT_{1}	—	February 16, 1988	La Silla	E. W. Elst	DOR	4.5 km	MPC · JPL
118172 Vorgebirge	1989 GU_{6}	Vorgebirge	April 5, 1989	La Silla	Geffert, M.	·	3.4 km	MPC · JPL
118173 Barmen	1991 GZ_{10}	Barmen	April 11, 1991	Tautenburg Observatory	F. Börngen	·	8.3 km	MPC · JPL
118174	1991 RO_{24}	—	September 12, 1991	Palomar	H. E. Holt	·	1.8 km	MPC · JPL
118175	1991 TL_{16}	—	October 6, 1991	Palomar	Lowe, A.	·	1.3 km	MPC · JPL
118176	1992 BK_{3}	—	January 26, 1992	Kitt Peak	Spacewatch	·	2.1 km	MPC · JPL
118177	1992 EZ_{13}	—	March 2, 1992	La Silla	UESAC	HIL · 3:2	9.7 km	MPC · JPL
118178 Rinckart	1992 SJ_{26}	Rinckart	September 23, 1992	Tautenburg Observatory	F. Börngen	·	6.2 km	MPC · JPL
118179	1993 FC_{6}	—	March 17, 1993	La Silla	UESAC	·	2.2 km	MPC · JPL
118180	1993 FF_{6}	—	March 17, 1993	La Silla	UESAC	·	1.7 km	MPC · JPL
118181	1993 FD_{7}	—	March 17, 1993	La Silla	UESAC	·	3.3 km	MPC · JPL
118182	1993 FH_{18}	—	March 17, 1993	La Silla	UESAC	·	1.9 km	MPC · JPL
118183	1993 FQ_{22}	—	March 21, 1993	La Silla	UESAC	NYS	1.8 km	MPC · JPL
118184	1993 FX_{22}	—	March 21, 1993	La Silla	UESAC	NYS	2.3 km	MPC · JPL
118185	1993 FF_{29}	—	March 21, 1993	La Silla	UESAC	·	1.4 km	MPC · JPL
118186	1993 XC	—	December 4, 1993	Farra d'Isonzo	Farra d'Isonzo	CYB	6.5 km	MPC · JPL
118187	1993 YC_{1}	—	December 16, 1993	Kitt Peak	Spacewatch	·	2.2 km	MPC · JPL
118188	1994 GO_{5}	—	April 6, 1994	Kitt Peak	Spacewatch	·	2.7 km	MPC · JPL
118189	1994 PB_{12}	—	August 10, 1994	La Silla	E. W. Elst	NYS	1.4 km	MPC · JPL
118190	1994 PT_{12}	—	August 10, 1994	La Silla	E. W. Elst	NYS ·	2.6 km	MPC · JPL
118191	1994 PE_{14}	—	August 10, 1994	La Silla	E. W. Elst	·	2.2 km	MPC · JPL
118192	1994 RA_{14}	—	September 12, 1994	Kitt Peak	Spacewatch	·	3.3 km	MPC · JPL
118193	1994 RG_{25}	—	September 12, 1994	Xinglong	SCAP	·	2.8 km	MPC · JPL
118194 Sabinagarroni	1994 SG	Sabinagarroni	September 30, 1994	Farra d'Isonzo	Farra d'Isonzo	·	2.2 km	MPC · JPL
118195	1994 SP_{7}	—	September 28, 1994	Kitt Peak	Spacewatch	fast	5.5 km	MPC · JPL
118196	1994 TK_{8}	—	October 6, 1994	Kitt Peak	Spacewatch	·	1.6 km	MPC · JPL
118197	1994 UU_{6}	—	October 28, 1994	Kitt Peak	Spacewatch	·	2.0 km	MPC · JPL
118198	1994 UA_{10}	—	October 28, 1994	Kitt Peak	Spacewatch	·	2.1 km	MPC · JPL
118199	1995 CY_{5}	—	February 1, 1995	Kitt Peak	Spacewatch	NYS	2.1 km	MPC · JPL
118200	1995 CA_{8}	—	February 2, 1995	Kitt Peak	Spacewatch	H	1.1 km	MPC · JPL

== 118201–118300 ==
back to top

Designation			Discovery			Properties		Ref
Permanent	Provisional	Named after	Date	Site	Discoverer(s)	Category	Diam.	Ref
118201	1995 FQ_{19}	—	March 29, 1995	Kitt Peak	Spacewatch	·	2.8 km	MPC · JPL
118202	1995 HQ_{3}	—	April 26, 1995	Kitt Peak	Spacewatch	·	2.0 km	MPC · JPL
118203	1995 HL_{4}	—	April 26, 1995	Kitt Peak	Spacewatch	MIS	4.7 km	MPC · JPL
118204	1995 MS_{1}	—	June 23, 1995	Kitt Peak	Spacewatch	HNS	1.6 km	MPC · JPL
118205	1995 MK_{7}	—	June 25, 1995	Kitt Peak	Spacewatch	ADE	5.3 km	MPC · JPL
118206	1995 OB_{6}	—	July 22, 1995	Kitt Peak	Spacewatch	·	2.7 km	MPC · JPL
118207	1995 SJ_{10}	—	September 17, 1995	Kitt Peak	Spacewatch	·	920 m	MPC · JPL
118208	1995 TH_{10}	—	October 2, 1995	Kitt Peak	Spacewatch	KOR	2.5 km	MPC · JPL
118209	1995 UH_{20}	—	October 19, 1995	Kitt Peak	Spacewatch	KOR	1.9 km	MPC · JPL
118210	1995 UG_{56}	—	October 23, 1995	Kitt Peak	Spacewatch	·	1.3 km	MPC · JPL
118211	1995 VE_{18}	—	November 15, 1995	Kitt Peak	Spacewatch	·	1.2 km	MPC · JPL
118212	1995 XM_{4}	—	December 14, 1995	Kitt Peak	Spacewatch	HOF	5.3 km	MPC · JPL
118213	1995 YO_{18}	—	December 22, 1995	Kitt Peak	Spacewatch	·	4.7 km	MPC · JPL
118214 Agnesediboemia	1996 AG_{1}	Agnesediboemia	January 12, 1996	Kleť	J. Tichá, M. Tichý	·	6.5 km	MPC · JPL
118215	1996 BN_{1}	—	January 24, 1996	Cloudcroft	W. Offutt	·	3.6 km	MPC · JPL
118216	1996 DU_{1}	—	February 22, 1996	Stroncone	A. Vagnozzi	·	1.3 km	MPC · JPL
118217	1996 EO_{7}	—	March 11, 1996	Kitt Peak	Spacewatch	NYS	1.4 km	MPC · JPL
118218	1996 GM_{17}	—	April 15, 1996	La Silla	E. W. Elst	·	2.6 km	MPC · JPL
118219	1996 HT_{20}	—	April 18, 1996	La Silla	E. W. Elst	·	4.4 km	MPC · JPL
118220	1996 HA_{21}	—	April 18, 1996	La Silla	E. W. Elst	NYS	2.2 km	MPC · JPL
118221	1996 HQ_{21}	—	April 18, 1996	La Silla	E. W. Elst	·	3.6 km	MPC · JPL
118222	1996 RR_{11}	—	September 8, 1996	Kitt Peak	Spacewatch	·	3.1 km	MPC · JPL
118223	1996 SO_{4}	—	September 21, 1996	Xinglong	SCAP	PAL	4.0 km	MPC · JPL
118224	1996 TT_{1}	—	October 3, 1996	Xinglong	SCAP	·	3.4 km	MPC · JPL
118225	1996 TP_{18}	—	October 4, 1996	Kitt Peak	Spacewatch	KOR	2.2 km	MPC · JPL
118226	1996 TA_{30}	—	October 7, 1996	Kitt Peak	Spacewatch	·	3.4 km	MPC · JPL
118227	1996 TR_{39}	—	October 8, 1996	La Silla	E. W. Elst	HNS	2.8 km	MPC · JPL
118228	1996 TQ_{66}	—	October 8, 1996	Mauna Kea	J. Chen, D. C. Jewitt, C. A. Trujillo, J. X. Luu	plutino	180 km	MPC · JPL
118229	1996 VE_{23}	—	November 10, 1996	Kitt Peak	Spacewatch	·	3.6 km	MPC · JPL
118230 Sado	1996 WY_{2}	Sado	November 30, 1996	Chichibu	N. Satō	·	3.2 km	MPC · JPL
118231	1996 XQ_{18}	—	December 8, 1996	Catalina Station	C. W. Hergenrother	·	4.7 km	MPC · JPL
118232	1997 AY_{6}	—	January 9, 1997	Oizumi	T. Kobayashi	DOR	5.5 km	MPC · JPL
118233 Gfrancoferrini	1997 BX_{6}	Gfrancoferrini	January 30, 1997	Cima Ekar	U. Munari, M. Tombelli	·	1.8 km	MPC · JPL
118234	1997 BO_{7}	—	January 31, 1997	Kitt Peak	Spacewatch	·	3.3 km	MPC · JPL
118235 Federico	1997 ES_{7}	Federico	March 7, 1997	Bologna	San Vittore	·	1.7 km	MPC · JPL
118236	1997 EO_{26}	—	March 4, 1997	Kitt Peak	Spacewatch	HYG	5.1 km	MPC · JPL
118237	1997 GD_{16}	—	April 3, 1997	Socorro	LINEAR	·	1.4 km	MPC · JPL
118238	1997 JT_{5}	—	May 2, 1997	Kitt Peak	Spacewatch	·	7.3 km	MPC · JPL
118239	1997 KX	—	May 31, 1997	Xinglong	SCAP	·	7.5 km	MPC · JPL
118240	1997 LS_{3}	—	June 5, 1997	Kitt Peak	Spacewatch	·	4.5 km	MPC · JPL
118241	1997 LJ_{9}	—	June 7, 1997	La Silla	E. W. Elst	MAS	1.2 km	MPC · JPL
118242	1997 NM_{3}	—	July 9, 1997	Prescott	P. G. Comba	NYS	2.5 km	MPC · JPL
118243	1997 QL_{1}	—	August 30, 1997	Kleť	Z. Moravec	·	1.8 km	MPC · JPL
118244	1997 RV_{10}	—	September 3, 1997	Caussols	ODAS	·	1.8 km	MPC · JPL
118245	1997 SF_{10}	—	September 23, 1997	Xinglong	SCAP	NYS	2.1 km	MPC · JPL
118246	1997 SR_{15}	—	September 27, 1997	Caussols	ODAS	·	3.1 km	MPC · JPL
118247	1997 TH_{1}	—	October 3, 1997	Caussols	ODAS	NYS	2.2 km	MPC · JPL
118248	1997 TS_{19}	—	October 2, 1997	Kitt Peak	Spacewatch	·	2.3 km	MPC · JPL
118249	1997 WF_{15}	—	November 23, 1997	Kitt Peak	Spacewatch	·	2.3 km	MPC · JPL
118250	1998 BY_{1}	—	January 19, 1998	Uenohara	N. Kawasato	·	2.7 km	MPC · JPL
118251	1998 BF_{18}	—	January 22, 1998	Kitt Peak	Spacewatch	·	2.8 km	MPC · JPL
118252	1998 BW_{33}	—	January 31, 1998	Oizumi	T. Kobayashi	·	4.1 km	MPC · JPL
118253	1998 BK_{43}	—	January 23, 1998	Kitt Peak	Spacewatch	KOR	1.8 km	MPC · JPL
118254	1998 CU	—	February 4, 1998	Kleť	M. Tichý, Z. Moravec	JUN	2.0 km	MPC · JPL
118255	1998 CZ_{2}	—	February 6, 1998	La Silla	E. W. Elst	·	3.2 km	MPC · JPL
118256	1998 DX_{25}	—	February 23, 1998	Kitt Peak	Spacewatch	·	3.2 km	MPC · JPL
118257	1998 FS_{17}	—	March 20, 1998	Socorro	LINEAR	·	3.0 km	MPC · JPL
118258	1998 FG_{41}	—	March 20, 1998	Socorro	LINEAR	·	2.7 km	MPC · JPL
118259	1998 FT_{52}	—	March 20, 1998	Socorro	LINEAR	·	7.3 km	MPC · JPL
118260	1998 FP_{54}	—	March 20, 1998	Socorro	LINEAR	·	3.6 km	MPC · JPL
118261	1998 FF_{79}	—	March 24, 1998	Socorro	LINEAR	·	5.1 km	MPC · JPL
118262	1998 FO_{85}	—	March 24, 1998	Socorro	LINEAR	·	4.2 km	MPC · JPL
118263	1998 FE_{90}	—	March 24, 1998	Socorro	LINEAR	·	5.2 km	MPC · JPL
118264	1998 FB_{105}	—	March 31, 1998	Socorro	LINEAR	·	3.9 km	MPC · JPL
118265	1998 FM_{142}	—	March 29, 1998	Socorro	LINEAR	MRX	2.2 km	MPC · JPL
118266	1998 HQ_{17}	—	April 18, 1998	Socorro	LINEAR	·	6.2 km	MPC · JPL
118267	1998 HR_{56}	—	April 21, 1998	Socorro	LINEAR	·	6.1 km	MPC · JPL
118268	1998 HG_{61}	—	April 21, 1998	Socorro	LINEAR	·	5.4 km	MPC · JPL
118269	1998 HL_{74}	—	April 21, 1998	Socorro	LINEAR	·	4.8 km	MPC · JPL
118270	1998 HN_{129}	—	April 19, 1998	Socorro	LINEAR	DOR	4.6 km	MPC · JPL
118271	1998 HO_{149}	—	April 25, 1998	La Silla	E. W. Elst	·	1.6 km	MPC · JPL
118272	1998 KU_{10}	—	May 22, 1998	Kitt Peak	Spacewatch	EOS	3.8 km	MPC · JPL
118273	1998 OX_{9}	—	July 26, 1998	La Silla	E. W. Elst	·	1.2 km	MPC · JPL
118274	1998 QE_{20}	—	August 17, 1998	Socorro	LINEAR	·	1.7 km	MPC · JPL
118275	1998 QR_{24}	—	August 17, 1998	Socorro	LINEAR	·	1.5 km	MPC · JPL
118276	1998 QM_{33}	—	August 17, 1998	Socorro	LINEAR	·	1.3 km	MPC · JPL
118277	1998 QE_{105}	—	August 25, 1998	La Silla	E. W. Elst	·	1.4 km	MPC · JPL
118278	1998 RO_{17}	—	September 14, 1998	Socorro	LINEAR	·	1.4 km	MPC · JPL
118279	1998 RG_{23}	—	September 14, 1998	Socorro	LINEAR	·	2.0 km	MPC · JPL
118280	1998 RQ_{31}	—	September 14, 1998	Socorro	LINEAR	·	1.9 km	MPC · JPL
118281	1998 RH_{43}	—	September 14, 1998	Socorro	LINEAR	·	1.7 km	MPC · JPL
118282	1998 RB_{48}	—	September 14, 1998	Socorro	LINEAR	·	1.3 km	MPC · JPL
118283	1998 RU_{55}	—	September 14, 1998	Socorro	LINEAR	·	1.6 km	MPC · JPL
118284	1998 RC_{59}	—	September 14, 1998	Socorro	LINEAR	V	1.1 km	MPC · JPL
118285	1998 RF_{65}	—	September 14, 1998	Socorro	LINEAR	·	1.5 km	MPC · JPL
118286	1998 RR_{66}	—	September 14, 1998	Socorro	LINEAR	·	1.9 km	MPC · JPL
118287	1998 RY_{66}	—	September 14, 1998	Socorro	LINEAR	·	3.8 km	MPC · JPL
118288	1998 SK_{4}	—	September 20, 1998	Prescott	P. G. Comba	·	1.4 km	MPC · JPL
118289	1998 SN_{10}	—	September 19, 1998	Uenohara	N. Kawasato	V	1.4 km	MPC · JPL
118290	1998 SZ_{26}	—	September 20, 1998	Xinglong	SCAP	·	1.6 km	MPC · JPL
118291	1998 SU_{46}	—	September 25, 1998	Kitt Peak	Spacewatch	·	1.6 km	MPC · JPL
118292	1998 SE_{57}	—	September 17, 1998	Anderson Mesa	LONEOS	·	3.9 km	MPC · JPL
118293	1998 SV_{62}	—	September 25, 1998	Xinglong	SCAP	·	2.0 km	MPC · JPL
118294	1998 SQ_{75}	—	September 17, 1998	Xinglong	SCAP	V	1.1 km	MPC · JPL
118295	1998 SA_{111}	—	September 26, 1998	Socorro	LINEAR	V	1.2 km	MPC · JPL
118296	1998 SL_{122}	—	September 26, 1998	Socorro	LINEAR	ERI	3.7 km	MPC · JPL
118297	1998 SY_{129}	—	September 26, 1998	Socorro	LINEAR	·	1.6 km	MPC · JPL
118298	1998 SC_{131}	—	September 26, 1998	Socorro	LINEAR	·	1.4 km	MPC · JPL
118299	1998 SD_{148}	—	September 26, 1998	Socorro	LINEAR	·	2.1 km	MPC · JPL
118300	1998 SL_{162}	—	September 26, 1998	Socorro	LINEAR	·	2.2 km	MPC · JPL

== 118301–118400 ==
back to top

Designation			Discovery			Properties		Ref
Permanent	Provisional	Named after	Date	Site	Discoverer(s)	Category	Diam.	Ref
118301	1998 TO_{16}	—	October 14, 1998	Caussols	ODAS	·	1.3 km	MPC · JPL
118302	1998 TX_{36}	—	October 14, 1998	Anderson Mesa	LONEOS	·	1.5 km	MPC · JPL
118303	1998 UG	—	October 17, 1998	Catalina	CSS	PHO · moon	4.3 km	MPC · JPL
118304	1998 UQ_{20}	—	October 28, 1998	Višnjan Observatory	K. Korlević	·	1.6 km	MPC · JPL
118305	1998 UU_{30}	—	October 18, 1998	La Silla	E. W. Elst	·	2.1 km	MPC · JPL
118306	1998 US_{39}	—	October 28, 1998	Socorro	LINEAR	NYS	1.6 km	MPC · JPL
118307	1998 VM_{1}	—	November 10, 1998	Socorro	LINEAR	·	2.1 km	MPC · JPL
118308	1998 VT_{7}	—	November 10, 1998	Socorro	LINEAR	fast	1.6 km	MPC · JPL
118309	1998 VR_{9}	—	November 10, 1998	Socorro	LINEAR	·	1.6 km	MPC · JPL
118310	1998 VP_{32}	—	November 15, 1998	Catalina	CSS	PHO	2.4 km	MPC · JPL
118311	1998 VU_{36}	—	November 10, 1998	Socorro	LINEAR	·	1.5 km	MPC · JPL
118312	1998 VM_{39}	—	November 11, 1998	Socorro	LINEAR	·	1.8 km	MPC · JPL
118313	1998 WV_{2}	—	November 17, 1998	Caussols	ODAS	·	1.3 km	MPC · JPL
118314	1998 WG_{11}	—	November 21, 1998	Socorro	LINEAR	·	1.4 km	MPC · JPL
118315	1998 WR_{12}	—	November 21, 1998	Socorro	LINEAR	·	1.5 km	MPC · JPL
118316	1998 WC_{15}	—	November 21, 1998	Socorro	LINEAR	NYS	2.1 km	MPC · JPL
118317	1998 WK_{41}	—	November 18, 1998	Socorro	LINEAR	V	1.2 km	MPC · JPL
118318	1998 XW	—	December 7, 1998	Caussols	ODAS	NYS	1.5 km	MPC · JPL
118319	1998 XP_{10}	—	December 15, 1998	Caussols	ODAS	MAS	2.5 km	MPC · JPL
118320	1998 XB_{11}	—	December 15, 1998	Caussols	ODAS	·	2.3 km	MPC · JPL
118321	1998 XS_{12}	—	December 15, 1998	Višnjan Observatory	K. Korlević	V	1.2 km	MPC · JPL
118322	1998 XK_{48}	—	December 14, 1998	Socorro	LINEAR	·	1.8 km	MPC · JPL
118323	1998 XU_{52}	—	December 14, 1998	Socorro	LINEAR	·	1.9 km	MPC · JPL
118324	1998 XB_{57}	—	December 15, 1998	Socorro	LINEAR	·	1.8 km	MPC · JPL
118325	1998 XP_{71}	—	December 14, 1998	Socorro	LINEAR	·	1.7 km	MPC · JPL
118326	1998 YR_{20}	—	December 25, 1998	Kitt Peak	Spacewatch	MAS	1.2 km	MPC · JPL
118327	1998 YZ_{20}	—	December 26, 1998	Kitt Peak	Spacewatch	·	1.8 km	MPC · JPL
118328	1998 YH_{21}	—	December 26, 1998	Kitt Peak	Spacewatch	·	2.5 km	MPC · JPL
118329	1998 YG_{24}	—	December 16, 1998	Socorro	LINEAR	·	1.6 km	MPC · JPL
118330	1999 AP	—	January 4, 1999	Farra d'Isonzo	Farra d'Isonzo	ERI	3.4 km	MPC · JPL
118331	1999 AM_{2}	—	January 9, 1999	Oizumi	T. Kobayashi	·	2.5 km	MPC · JPL
118332	1999 AK_{14}	—	January 8, 1999	Kitt Peak	Spacewatch	MAS	1.7 km	MPC · JPL
118333	1999 AB_{24}	—	January 15, 1999	Catalina	CSS	·	2.6 km	MPC · JPL
118334	1999 AY_{24}	—	January 15, 1999	Caussols	ODAS	·	2.0 km	MPC · JPL
118335	1999 BF_{2}	—	January 19, 1999	Catalina	CSS	PHO	2.2 km	MPC · JPL
118336	1999 BB_{7}	—	January 20, 1999	Farra d'Isonzo	Farra d'Isonzo	·	1.8 km	MPC · JPL
118337	1999 BQ_{9}	—	January 23, 1999	Catalina	CSS	·	4.8 km	MPC · JPL
118338	1999 CS	—	February 5, 1999	Oizumi	T. Kobayashi	·	2.7 km	MPC · JPL
118339	1999 CK_{18}	—	February 10, 1999	Socorro	LINEAR	·	3.7 km	MPC · JPL
118340	1999 CL_{20}	—	February 10, 1999	Socorro	LINEAR	·	1.6 km	MPC · JPL
118341	1999 CK_{25}	—	February 10, 1999	Socorro	LINEAR	·	3.3 km	MPC · JPL
118342	1999 CW_{26}	—	February 10, 1999	Socorro	LINEAR	NYS	2.1 km	MPC · JPL
118343	1999 CT_{27}	—	February 10, 1999	Socorro	LINEAR	·	2.5 km	MPC · JPL
118344	1999 CS_{42}	—	February 10, 1999	Socorro	LINEAR	·	2.0 km	MPC · JPL
118345	1999 CZ_{45}	—	February 10, 1999	Socorro	LINEAR	·	2.4 km	MPC · JPL
118346	1999 CA_{48}	—	February 10, 1999	Socorro	LINEAR	·	1.8 km	MPC · JPL
118347	1999 CM_{60}	—	February 12, 1999	Socorro	LINEAR	·	2.9 km	MPC · JPL
118348	1999 CT_{86}	—	February 10, 1999	Socorro	LINEAR	·	1.4 km	MPC · JPL
118349	1999 CG_{88}	—	February 10, 1999	Socorro	LINEAR	·	1.7 km	MPC · JPL
118350	1999 CR_{89}	—	February 10, 1999	Socorro	LINEAR	NYS ·	3.9 km	MPC · JPL
118351	1999 CF_{98}	—	February 10, 1999	Socorro	LINEAR	·	2.8 km	MPC · JPL
118352	1999 CA_{101}	—	February 10, 1999	Socorro	LINEAR	·	3.3 km	MPC · JPL
118353	1999 CZ_{104}	—	February 12, 1999	Socorro	LINEAR	·	2.0 km	MPC · JPL
118354	1999 CY_{149}	—	February 13, 1999	Kitt Peak	Spacewatch	·	2.8 km	MPC · JPL
118355	1999 CA_{154}	—	February 14, 1999	Anderson Mesa	LONEOS	·	3.5 km	MPC · JPL
118356	1999 EM_{3}	—	March 12, 1999	Bergisch Gladbach	W. Bickel	·	6.2 km	MPC · JPL
118357	1999 EM_{11}	—	March 15, 1999	Kitt Peak	Spacewatch	·	1.7 km	MPC · JPL
118358	1999 FH_{2}	—	March 16, 1999	Kitt Peak	Spacewatch	·	1.9 km	MPC · JPL
118359	1999 FZ_{3}	—	March 16, 1999	Kitt Peak	Spacewatch	·	1.4 km	MPC · JPL
118360	1999 FV_{4}	—	March 17, 1999	Kitt Peak	Spacewatch	·	2.6 km	MPC · JPL
118361	1999 FX_{4}	—	March 17, 1999	Kitt Peak	Spacewatch	·	2.2 km	MPC · JPL
118362	1999 FS_{17}	—	March 23, 1999	Kitt Peak	Spacewatch	·	2.3 km	MPC · JPL
118363	1999 FH_{46}	—	March 20, 1999	Socorro	LINEAR	·	2.4 km	MPC · JPL
118364	1999 FT_{47}	—	March 20, 1999	Socorro	LINEAR	NYS	2.7 km	MPC · JPL
118365	1999 FQ_{52}	—	March 20, 1999	Socorro	LINEAR	·	2.7 km	MPC · JPL
118366	1999 GK	—	April 5, 1999	Modra	Tóth, Kalmančok, D.	EUN	2.2 km	MPC · JPL
118367	1999 GC_{4}	—	April 12, 1999	Woomera	F. B. Zoltowski	·	2.6 km	MPC · JPL
118368	1999 GE_{11}	—	April 11, 1999	Kitt Peak	Spacewatch	·	2.5 km	MPC · JPL
118369	1999 GF_{11}	—	April 11, 1999	Kitt Peak	Spacewatch	·	1.8 km	MPC · JPL
118370	1999 GT_{13}	—	April 14, 1999	Kitt Peak	Spacewatch	·	2.0 km	MPC · JPL
118371	1999 GE_{33}	—	April 12, 1999	Socorro	LINEAR	JUN	1.7 km	MPC · JPL
118372	1999 GV_{33}	—	April 12, 1999	Socorro	LINEAR	·	2.4 km	MPC · JPL
118373	1999 GD_{41}	—	April 12, 1999	Socorro	LINEAR	·	1.9 km	MPC · JPL
118374	1999 GU_{55}	—	April 7, 1999	Kitt Peak	Spacewatch	(5)	1.6 km	MPC · JPL
118375	1999 HB_{4}	—	April 16, 1999	Kitt Peak	Spacewatch	·	2.4 km	MPC · JPL
118376	1999 HE_{4}	—	April 16, 1999	Kitt Peak	Spacewatch	·	2.0 km	MPC · JPL
118377	1999 HW_{7}	—	April 19, 1999	Kitt Peak	Spacewatch	·	2.3 km	MPC · JPL
118378	1999 HT_{11}	—	April 17, 1999	Kitt Peak	Kitt Peak	res · 4:7	132 km	MPC · JPL
118379	1999 HC_{12}	—	April 18, 1999	Kitt Peak	Kitt Peak	cubewano (hot) · critical	144 km	MPC · JPL
118380	1999 JQ_{5}	—	May 10, 1999	Socorro	LINEAR	H	990 m	MPC · JPL
118381	1999 JU_{5}	—	May 12, 1999	Socorro	LINEAR	H	1.1 km	MPC · JPL
118382	1999 JH_{6}	—	May 12, 1999	Socorro	LINEAR	H	1.1 km	MPC · JPL
118383	1999 JE_{7}	—	May 8, 1999	Catalina	CSS	EUN	2.6 km	MPC · JPL
118384	1999 JA_{8}	—	May 12, 1999	Socorro	LINEAR	PHO	2.3 km	MPC · JPL
118385	1999 JP_{11}	—	May 12, 1999	Socorro	LINEAR	·	6.5 km	MPC · JPL
118386	1999 JF_{14}	—	May 13, 1999	Socorro	LINEAR	H	1.3 km	MPC · JPL
118387	1999 JC_{15}	—	May 12, 1999	Socorro	LINEAR	·	7.6 km	MPC · JPL
118388	1999 JR_{42}	—	May 10, 1999	Socorro	LINEAR	NYS	1.7 km	MPC · JPL
118389	1999 JV_{42}	—	May 10, 1999	Socorro	LINEAR	·	5.5 km	MPC · JPL
118390	1999 JS_{49}	—	May 10, 1999	Socorro	LINEAR	·	4.8 km	MPC · JPL
118391	1999 JV_{117}	—	May 13, 1999	Socorro	LINEAR	·	4.5 km	MPC · JPL
118392	1999 JO_{124}	—	May 10, 1999	Socorro	LINEAR	·	3.7 km	MPC · JPL
118393	1999 KB_{3}	—	May 17, 1999	Kitt Peak	Spacewatch	·	3.3 km	MPC · JPL
118394	1999 NV_{7}	—	July 13, 1999	Socorro	LINEAR	·	6.7 km	MPC · JPL
118395	1999 NB_{65}	—	July 14, 1999	Socorro	LINEAR	·	7.6 km	MPC · JPL
118396	1999 RY_{29}	—	September 8, 1999	Socorro	LINEAR	H	1.3 km	MPC · JPL
118397	1999 RO_{45}	—	September 8, 1999	Uccle	T. Pauwels	·	4.9 km	MPC · JPL
118398	1999 RO_{58}	—	September 7, 1999	Socorro	LINEAR	·	6.5 km	MPC · JPL
118399	1999 RM_{61}	—	September 7, 1999	Socorro	LINEAR	·	6.9 km	MPC · JPL
118400	1999 RB_{63}	—	September 7, 1999	Socorro	LINEAR	·	6.6 km	MPC · JPL

== 118401–118500 ==
back to top

Designation			Discovery			Properties		Ref
Permanent	Provisional	Named after	Date	Site	Discoverer(s)	Category	Diam.	Ref
118401 LINEAR	1999 RE_{70}	LINEAR	September 7, 1999	Socorro	LINEAR	THM · Comet (176P)	3.5 km	MPC · JPL
118402	1999 RK_{78}	—	September 7, 1999	Socorro	LINEAR	HYG	3.8 km	MPC · JPL
118403	1999 RY_{92}	—	September 7, 1999	Socorro	LINEAR	·	6.0 km	MPC · JPL
118404	1999 RC_{93}	—	September 7, 1999	Socorro	LINEAR	EOS · fast	4.0 km	MPC · JPL
118405	1999 RM_{104}	—	September 8, 1999	Socorro	LINEAR	·	3.6 km	MPC · JPL
118406	1999 RM_{168}	—	September 9, 1999	Socorro	LINEAR	·	5.5 km	MPC · JPL
118407	1999 RA_{201}	—	September 8, 1999	Socorro	LINEAR	·	6.5 km	MPC · JPL
118408	1999 RV_{220}	—	September 5, 1999	Catalina	CSS	·	4.4 km	MPC · JPL
118409	1999 RB_{234}	—	September 8, 1999	Catalina	CSS	(3025)	7.2 km	MPC · JPL
118410	1999 RD_{239}	—	September 8, 1999	Catalina	CSS	·	7.1 km	MPC · JPL
118411	1999 RV_{251}	—	September 6, 1999	Catalina	CSS	H	1.4 km	MPC · JPL
118412	1999 RG_{253}	—	September 8, 1999	Kitt Peak	Spacewatch	·	8.2 km	MPC · JPL
118413	1999 SP_{1}	—	September 19, 1999	Ondřejov	L. Kotková	·	5.3 km	MPC · JPL
118414	1999 SU_{10}	—	September 30, 1999	Catalina	CSS	·	6.4 km	MPC · JPL
118415	1999 SV_{19}	—	September 30, 1999	Socorro	LINEAR	LIX	8.7 km	MPC · JPL
118416	1999 TD_{9}	—	October 7, 1999	Višnjan Observatory	K. Korlević, M. Jurić	·	6.6 km	MPC · JPL
118417	1999 TW_{12}	—	October 10, 1999	Fountain Hills	C. W. Juels	·	3.9 km	MPC · JPL
118418 Yangmei	1999 TP_{18}	Yangmei	October 14, 1999	Xinglong	SCAP	VER	5.5 km	MPC · JPL
118419	1999 TK_{53}	—	October 6, 1999	Kitt Peak	Spacewatch	HYG	5.3 km	MPC · JPL
118420	1999 TF_{59}	—	October 7, 1999	Kitt Peak	Spacewatch	THM	5.7 km	MPC · JPL
118421	1999 TM_{65}	—	October 8, 1999	Kitt Peak	Spacewatch	·	4.3 km	MPC · JPL
118422	1999 TU_{71}	—	October 9, 1999	Kitt Peak	Spacewatch	THM	4.1 km	MPC · JPL
118423	1999 TJ_{84}	—	October 13, 1999	Kitt Peak	Spacewatch	·	8.0 km	MPC · JPL
118424	1999 TL_{111}	—	October 4, 1999	Socorro	LINEAR	·	6.1 km	MPC · JPL
118425	1999 TG_{114}	—	October 4, 1999	Socorro	LINEAR	·	1.2 km	MPC · JPL
118426	1999 TX_{136}	—	October 6, 1999	Socorro	LINEAR	HYG	4.7 km	MPC · JPL
118427	1999 TM_{148}	—	October 7, 1999	Socorro	LINEAR	·	5.2 km	MPC · JPL
118428	1999 TG_{157}	—	October 9, 1999	Socorro	LINEAR	ARM	6.4 km	MPC · JPL
118429	1999 TE_{163}	—	October 9, 1999	Socorro	LINEAR	·	5.9 km	MPC · JPL
118430	1999 TZ_{171}	—	October 10, 1999	Socorro	LINEAR	·	4.4 km	MPC · JPL
118431	1999 TD_{187}	—	October 12, 1999	Socorro	LINEAR	CYB	8.8 km	MPC · JPL
118432	1999 TL_{214}	—	October 15, 1999	Socorro	LINEAR	·	5.5 km	MPC · JPL
118433	1999 TN_{235}	—	October 3, 1999	Catalina	CSS	HYG	5.9 km	MPC · JPL
118434	1999 TY_{250}	—	October 5, 1999	Socorro	LINEAR	·	6.1 km	MPC · JPL
118435	1999 TK_{273}	—	October 5, 1999	Socorro	LINEAR	·	9.9 km	MPC · JPL
118436	1999 TU_{275}	—	October 6, 1999	Socorro	LINEAR	·	5.6 km	MPC · JPL
118437	1999 TB_{285}	—	October 9, 1999	Socorro	LINEAR	·	6.5 km	MPC · JPL
118438	1999 UK_{17}	—	October 29, 1999	Kitt Peak	Spacewatch	EOS	3.7 km	MPC · JPL
118439	1999 UT_{20}	—	October 31, 1999	Kitt Peak	Spacewatch	·	3.2 km	MPC · JPL
118440	1999 UM_{37}	—	October 16, 1999	Kitt Peak	Spacewatch	THM	3.5 km	MPC · JPL
118441	1999 UP_{39}	—	October 31, 1999	Kitt Peak	Spacewatch	LIX	8.2 km	MPC · JPL
118442	1999 UM_{54}	—	October 19, 1999	Kitt Peak	Spacewatch	·	4.1 km	MPC · JPL
118443	1999 UZ_{62}	—	October 28, 1999	Catalina	CSS	·	3.6 km	MPC · JPL
118444	1999 VK_{20}	—	November 11, 1999	Fountain Hills	C. W. Juels	TIR	4.9 km	MPC · JPL
118445	1999 VH_{29}	—	November 3, 1999	Socorro	LINEAR	·	1.1 km	MPC · JPL
118446	1999 VK_{69}	—	November 4, 1999	Socorro	LINEAR	·	6.4 km	MPC · JPL
118447	1999 VM_{81}	—	November 5, 1999	Socorro	LINEAR	·	3.9 km	MPC · JPL
118448	1999 VH_{93}	—	November 9, 1999	Socorro	LINEAR	·	4.7 km	MPC · JPL
118449	1999 VY_{94}	—	November 9, 1999	Socorro	LINEAR	·	6.8 km	MPC · JPL
118450	1999 VV_{116}	—	November 5, 1999	Kitt Peak	Spacewatch	·	3.8 km	MPC · JPL
118451	1999 VX_{124}	—	November 9, 1999	Socorro	LINEAR	·	3.6 km	MPC · JPL
118452	1999 VH_{127}	—	November 9, 1999	Kitt Peak	Spacewatch	LIX	8.1 km	MPC · JPL
118453	1999 VP_{159}	—	November 14, 1999	Socorro	LINEAR	·	4.1 km	MPC · JPL
118454	1999 VU_{159}	—	November 14, 1999	Socorro	LINEAR	·	1.5 km	MPC · JPL
118455	1999 VP_{191}	—	November 12, 1999	Socorro	LINEAR	THM	6.0 km	MPC · JPL
118456	1999 VO_{205}	—	November 10, 1999	Anderson Mesa	LONEOS	·	8.2 km	MPC · JPL
118457	1999 WP_{6}	—	November 28, 1999	Višnjan Observatory	K. Korlević	·	5.6 km	MPC · JPL
118458	1999 WY_{11}	—	November 28, 1999	Kitt Peak	Spacewatch	·	1.4 km	MPC · JPL
118459	1999 XB_{6}	—	December 4, 1999	Catalina	CSS	·	1.7 km	MPC · JPL
118460	1999 XM_{6}	—	December 4, 1999	Catalina	CSS	·	7.6 km	MPC · JPL
118461	1999 XJ_{10}	—	December 5, 1999	Catalina	CSS	·	5.2 km	MPC · JPL
118462	1999 XQ_{24}	—	December 6, 1999	Socorro	LINEAR	·	9.6 km	MPC · JPL
118463	1999 XZ_{48}	—	December 7, 1999	Socorro	LINEAR	·	7.1 km	MPC · JPL
118464	1999 XE_{61}	—	December 7, 1999	Socorro	LINEAR	HYG	6.0 km	MPC · JPL
118465	1999 XR_{70}	—	December 7, 1999	Socorro	LINEAR	·	5.3 km	MPC · JPL
118466	1999 XK_{110}	—	December 4, 1999	Catalina	CSS	·	8.9 km	MPC · JPL
118467	1999 XO_{123}	—	December 7, 1999	Catalina	CSS	·	8.5 km	MPC · JPL
118468	1999 XT_{216}	—	December 13, 1999	Kitt Peak	Spacewatch	·	6.0 km	MPC · JPL
118469	1999 XW_{226}	—	December 15, 1999	Kitt Peak	Spacewatch	·	1.6 km	MPC · JPL
118470	2000 AG_{4}	—	January 3, 2000	Socorro	LINEAR	PHO	3.2 km	MPC · JPL
118471	2000 AF_{15}	—	January 3, 2000	Socorro	LINEAR	TIR	6.9 km	MPC · JPL
118472	2000 AJ_{31}	—	January 3, 2000	Socorro	LINEAR	·	1.8 km	MPC · JPL
118473	2000 AO_{34}	—	January 3, 2000	Socorro	LINEAR	·	2.1 km	MPC · JPL
118474	2000 AH_{41}	—	January 3, 2000	Socorro	LINEAR	CYB	10 km	MPC · JPL
118475	2000 AJ_{127}	—	January 5, 2000	Socorro	LINEAR	·	1.6 km	MPC · JPL
118476	2000 AF_{163}	—	January 5, 2000	Socorro	LINEAR	·	5.8 km	MPC · JPL
118477	2000 AQ_{168}	—	January 12, 2000	Prescott	P. G. Comba	·	1.7 km	MPC · JPL
118478	2000 AD_{211}	—	January 5, 2000	Kitt Peak	Spacewatch	·	870 m	MPC · JPL
118479	2000 AM_{238}	—	January 6, 2000	Socorro	LINEAR	·	1.5 km	MPC · JPL
118480	2000 BG_{10}	—	January 26, 2000	Kitt Peak	Spacewatch	·	2.6 km	MPC · JPL
118481	2000 BK_{32}	—	January 28, 2000	Kitt Peak	Spacewatch	·	1.6 km	MPC · JPL
118482	2000 BT_{51}	—	January 30, 2000	Catalina	CSS	·	1.9 km	MPC · JPL
118483	2000 CJ_{16}	—	February 2, 2000	Socorro	LINEAR	·	1.7 km	MPC · JPL
118484	2000 CK_{20}	—	February 2, 2000	Socorro	LINEAR	·	1.3 km	MPC · JPL
118485	2000 CP_{27}	—	February 2, 2000	Socorro	LINEAR	·	2.6 km	MPC · JPL
118486	2000 CN_{30}	—	February 2, 2000	Socorro	LINEAR	·	1.5 km	MPC · JPL
118487	2000 CK_{31}	—	February 2, 2000	Socorro	LINEAR	·	1.6 km	MPC · JPL
118488	2000 CP_{37}	—	February 3, 2000	Socorro	LINEAR	·	2.8 km	MPC · JPL
118489	2000 CR_{40}	—	February 1, 2000	Catalina	CSS	NYS ·	2.7 km	MPC · JPL
118490	2000 CN_{54}	—	February 2, 2000	Socorro	LINEAR	·	2.0 km	MPC · JPL
118491	2000 CC_{88}	—	February 4, 2000	Socorro	LINEAR	·	2.0 km	MPC · JPL
118492	2000 CK_{98}	—	February 7, 2000	Kitt Peak	Spacewatch	·	2.0 km	MPC · JPL
118493	2000 DH_{3}	—	February 27, 2000	Višnjan Observatory	K. Korlević, M. Jurić	·	1.8 km	MPC · JPL
118494	2000 DP_{8}	—	February 29, 2000	Socorro	LINEAR	V	1.4 km	MPC · JPL
118495	2000 DV_{9}	—	February 26, 2000	Kitt Peak	Spacewatch	·	1.3 km	MPC · JPL
118496	2000 DA_{34}	—	February 29, 2000	Socorro	LINEAR	NYS	1.9 km	MPC · JPL
118497	2000 DB_{34}	—	February 29, 2000	Socorro	LINEAR	·	2.0 km	MPC · JPL
118498	2000 DD_{42}	—	February 29, 2000	Socorro	LINEAR	·	2.9 km	MPC · JPL
118499	2000 DM_{59}	—	February 29, 2000	Socorro	LINEAR	MAS	1.1 km	MPC · JPL
118500	2000 DH_{64}	—	February 29, 2000	Socorro	LINEAR	·	1.5 km	MPC · JPL

== 118501–118600 ==
back to top

Designation			Discovery			Properties		Ref
Permanent	Provisional	Named after	Date	Site	Discoverer(s)	Category	Diam.	Ref
118501	2000 DO_{67}	—	February 29, 2000	Socorro	LINEAR	·	1.7 km	MPC · JPL
118502	2000 DV_{70}	—	February 29, 2000	Socorro	LINEAR	V	1.2 km	MPC · JPL
118503	2000 DA_{71}	—	February 29, 2000	Socorro	LINEAR	·	3.2 km	MPC · JPL
118504	2000 DS_{72}	—	February 29, 2000	Socorro	LINEAR	V	990 m	MPC · JPL
118505	2000 DL_{76}	—	February 29, 2000	Socorro	LINEAR	·	1.9 km	MPC · JPL
118506	2000 DX_{80}	—	February 28, 2000	Socorro	LINEAR	·	1.6 km	MPC · JPL
118507	2000 DV_{81}	—	February 28, 2000	Socorro	LINEAR	·	1.7 km	MPC · JPL
118508	2000 DW_{81}	—	February 28, 2000	Socorro	LINEAR	V	1.2 km	MPC · JPL
118509	2000 DA_{85}	—	February 29, 2000	Socorro	LINEAR	V	1.3 km	MPC · JPL
118510	2000 DC_{90}	—	February 27, 2000	Kitt Peak	Spacewatch	·	1.5 km	MPC · JPL
118511	2000 DR_{93}	—	February 28, 2000	Socorro	LINEAR	·	1.7 km	MPC · JPL
118512	2000 DR_{94}	—	February 28, 2000	Socorro	LINEAR	·	1.4 km	MPC · JPL
118513	2000 DD_{97}	—	February 29, 2000	Socorro	LINEAR	·	2.2 km	MPC · JPL
118514	2000 DJ_{104}	—	February 29, 2000	Socorro	LINEAR	·	1.6 km	MPC · JPL
118515	2000 DF_{105}	—	February 29, 2000	Socorro	LINEAR	·	1.9 km	MPC · JPL
118516	2000 DP_{105}	—	February 29, 2000	Socorro	LINEAR	·	1.3 km	MPC · JPL
118517	2000 DM_{106}	—	February 29, 2000	Socorro	LINEAR	·	1.4 km	MPC · JPL
118518	2000 DO_{116}	—	February 26, 2000	Catalina	CSS	NYS	2.5 km	MPC · JPL
118519	2000 EY_{10}	—	March 4, 2000	Socorro	LINEAR	PHO	1.8 km	MPC · JPL
118520	2000 EU_{11}	—	March 4, 2000	Socorro	LINEAR	HIL · 3:2 · (6124)	10 km	MPC · JPL
118521	2000 EO_{14}	—	March 5, 2000	Višnjan Observatory	K. Korlević	·	1.5 km	MPC · JPL
118522	2000 EA_{16}	—	March 3, 2000	Kitt Peak	Spacewatch	·	1.8 km	MPC · JPL
118523	2000 EW_{22}	—	March 3, 2000	Kitt Peak	Spacewatch	·	2.4 km	MPC · JPL
118524	2000 EE_{24}	—	March 8, 2000	Kitt Peak	Spacewatch	(1338) (FLO)	890 m	MPC · JPL
118525	2000 ED_{30}	—	March 5, 2000	Socorro	LINEAR	·	2.1 km	MPC · JPL
118526	2000 EP_{30}	—	March 5, 2000	Socorro	LINEAR	·	3.1 km	MPC · JPL
118527	2000 EY_{33}	—	March 5, 2000	Socorro	LINEAR	·	4.4 km	MPC · JPL
118528	2000 EY_{39}	—	March 8, 2000	Socorro	LINEAR	MAS	1.8 km	MPC · JPL
118529	2000 EQ_{41}	—	March 8, 2000	Socorro	LINEAR	NYS	2.6 km	MPC · JPL
118530	2000 EW_{48}	—	March 9, 2000	Socorro	LINEAR	·	2.0 km	MPC · JPL
118531	2000 EH_{60}	—	March 10, 2000	Socorro	LINEAR	·	1.5 km	MPC · JPL
118532	2000 EJ_{61}	—	March 10, 2000	Socorro	LINEAR	V	1.5 km	MPC · JPL
118533	2000 EB_{69}	—	March 10, 2000	Socorro	LINEAR	·	2.1 km	MPC · JPL
118534	2000 ES_{69}	—	March 10, 2000	Socorro	LINEAR	NYS	2.3 km	MPC · JPL
118535	2000 EE_{70}	—	March 10, 2000	Socorro	LINEAR	·	3.1 km	MPC · JPL
118536	2000 EJ_{79}	—	March 5, 2000	Socorro	LINEAR	·	1.8 km	MPC · JPL
118537	2000 EQ_{80}	—	March 5, 2000	Socorro	LINEAR	·	1.8 km	MPC · JPL
118538	2000 ER_{86}	—	March 8, 2000	Socorro	LINEAR	·	1.7 km	MPC · JPL
118539	2000 EE_{87}	—	March 8, 2000	Socorro	LINEAR	·	1.8 km	MPC · JPL
118540	2000 ES_{90}	—	March 9, 2000	Socorro	LINEAR	·	2.7 km	MPC · JPL
118541	2000 EC_{96}	—	March 11, 2000	Socorro	LINEAR	·	1.6 km	MPC · JPL
118542	2000 EL_{113}	—	March 9, 2000	Kitt Peak	Spacewatch	V	1.2 km	MPC · JPL
118543	2000 EX_{120}	—	March 11, 2000	Anderson Mesa	LONEOS	·	1.4 km	MPC · JPL
118544	2000 EG_{121}	—	March 11, 2000	Anderson Mesa	LONEOS	(2076)	1.9 km	MPC · JPL
118545	2000 EC_{124}	—	March 11, 2000	Socorro	LINEAR	·	1.5 km	MPC · JPL
118546	2000 ET_{132}	—	March 11, 2000	Socorro	LINEAR	·	1.2 km	MPC · JPL
118547	2000 EJ_{133}	—	March 11, 2000	Socorro	LINEAR	·	2.2 km	MPC · JPL
118548	2000 EV_{139}	—	March 12, 2000	Catalina	CSS	·	1.7 km	MPC · JPL
118549	2000 EG_{155}	—	March 9, 2000	Socorro	LINEAR	·	1.6 km	MPC · JPL
118550	2000 EC_{156}	—	March 9, 2000	Socorro	LINEAR	V	1.3 km	MPC · JPL
118551	2000 EX_{157}	—	March 12, 2000	Anderson Mesa	LONEOS	·	2.7 km	MPC · JPL
118552	2000 EZ_{164}	—	March 3, 2000	Socorro	LINEAR	NYS	2.1 km	MPC · JPL
118553	2000 EB_{171}	—	March 5, 2000	Socorro	LINEAR	·	2.2 km	MPC · JPL
118554 Reedtimmer	2000 EM_{175}	Reedtimmer	March 2, 2000	Catalina	CSS	·	1.5 km	MPC · JPL
118555	2000 FH_{4}	—	March 27, 2000	Kitt Peak	Spacewatch	·	2.0 km	MPC · JPL
118556	2000 FN_{17}	—	March 29, 2000	Socorro	LINEAR	·	2.2 km	MPC · JPL
118557	2000 FU_{28}	—	March 27, 2000	Anderson Mesa	LONEOS	·	2.7 km	MPC · JPL
118558	2000 FF_{30}	—	March 27, 2000	Anderson Mesa	LONEOS	NYS	2.4 km	MPC · JPL
118559	2000 FT_{37}	—	March 29, 2000	Socorro	LINEAR	·	2.6 km	MPC · JPL
118560	2000 FW_{44}	—	March 29, 2000	Socorro	LINEAR	·	1.7 km	MPC · JPL
118561	2000 FY_{44}	—	March 29, 2000	Socorro	LINEAR	·	1.4 km	MPC · JPL
118562	2000 FC_{47}	—	March 29, 2000	Socorro	LINEAR	·	3.8 km	MPC · JPL
118563	2000 FJ_{47}	—	March 29, 2000	Socorro	LINEAR	·	1.9 km	MPC · JPL
118564	2000 FO_{47}	—	March 29, 2000	Socorro	LINEAR	NYS	1.8 km	MPC · JPL
118565	2000 FZ_{54}	—	March 30, 2000	Kitt Peak	Spacewatch	·	1.7 km	MPC · JPL
118566	2000 FL_{58}	—	March 27, 2000	Anderson Mesa	LONEOS	·	1.2 km	MPC · JPL
118567	2000 FQ_{59}	—	March 29, 2000	Socorro	LINEAR	·	2.1 km	MPC · JPL
118568	2000 GD	—	April 1, 2000	Kitt Peak	Spacewatch	·	2.1 km	MPC · JPL
118569	2000 GF_{1}	—	April 3, 2000	Socorro	LINEAR	·	2.5 km	MPC · JPL
118570	2000 GP_{1}	—	April 4, 2000	Prescott	P. G. Comba	·	1.6 km	MPC · JPL
118571	2000 GB_{5}	—	April 3, 2000	Socorro	LINEAR	·	2.6 km	MPC · JPL
118572	2000 GR_{12}	—	April 5, 2000	Socorro	LINEAR	MAS	1.2 km	MPC · JPL
118573	2000 GY_{12}	—	April 5, 2000	Socorro	LINEAR	·	2.1 km	MPC · JPL
118574	2000 GL_{18}	—	April 5, 2000	Socorro	LINEAR	·	4.6 km	MPC · JPL
118575	2000 GL_{23}	—	April 5, 2000	Socorro	LINEAR	·	2.2 km	MPC · JPL
118576	2000 GK_{27}	—	April 5, 2000	Socorro	LINEAR	·	2.9 km	MPC · JPL
118577	2000 GM_{31}	—	April 5, 2000	Socorro	LINEAR	(2076)	1.6 km	MPC · JPL
118578	2000 GL_{40}	—	April 5, 2000	Socorro	LINEAR	·	3.0 km	MPC · JPL
118579	2000 GX_{44}	—	April 5, 2000	Socorro	LINEAR	NYS	2.7 km	MPC · JPL
118580	2000 GA_{46}	—	April 5, 2000	Socorro	LINEAR	·	1.6 km	MPC · JPL
118581	2000 GO_{50}	—	April 5, 2000	Socorro	LINEAR	·	1.8 km	MPC · JPL
118582	2000 GG_{52}	—	April 5, 2000	Socorro	LINEAR	NYS	2.4 km	MPC · JPL
118583	2000 GU_{54}	—	April 5, 2000	Socorro	LINEAR	·	2.0 km	MPC · JPL
118584	2000 GE_{58}	—	April 5, 2000	Socorro	LINEAR	·	2.6 km	MPC · JPL
118585	2000 GR_{60}	—	April 5, 2000	Socorro	LINEAR	·	2.6 km	MPC · JPL
118586	2000 GK_{65}	—	April 5, 2000	Socorro	LINEAR	NYS	1.8 km	MPC · JPL
118587	2000 GM_{68}	—	April 5, 2000	Socorro	LINEAR	MAS	1.3 km	MPC · JPL
118588	2000 GL_{69}	—	April 5, 2000	Socorro	LINEAR	·	2.3 km	MPC · JPL
118589	2000 GA_{71}	—	April 5, 2000	Socorro	LINEAR	NYS	2.5 km	MPC · JPL
118590	2000 GR_{72}	—	April 5, 2000	Socorro	LINEAR	·	1.8 km	MPC · JPL
118591	2000 GD_{76}	—	April 5, 2000	Socorro	LINEAR	·	2.7 km	MPC · JPL
118592	2000 GF_{76}	—	April 5, 2000	Socorro	LINEAR	·	2.1 km	MPC · JPL
118593	2000 GQ_{76}	—	April 5, 2000	Socorro	LINEAR	·	2.6 km	MPC · JPL
118594	2000 GZ_{89}	—	April 4, 2000	Socorro	LINEAR	V	1.3 km	MPC · JPL
118595	2000 GZ_{91}	—	April 4, 2000	Socorro	LINEAR	·	3.7 km	MPC · JPL
118596	2000 GD_{93}	—	April 5, 2000	Socorro	LINEAR	·	2.1 km	MPC · JPL
118597	2000 GE_{97}	—	April 7, 2000	Socorro	LINEAR	·	3.4 km	MPC · JPL
118598	2000 GK_{101}	—	April 7, 2000	Socorro	LINEAR	·	1.2 km	MPC · JPL
118599	2000 GZ_{103}	—	April 7, 2000	Socorro	LINEAR	NYS · fast	2.7 km	MPC · JPL
118600	2000 GD_{106}	—	April 7, 2000	Socorro	LINEAR	·	2.3 km	MPC · JPL

== 118601–118700 ==
back to top

Designation			Discovery			Properties		Ref
Permanent	Provisional	Named after	Date	Site	Discoverer(s)	Category	Diam.	Ref
118601	2000 GJ_{107}	—	April 7, 2000	Socorro	LINEAR	·	3.8 km	MPC · JPL
118602	2000 GQ_{111}	—	April 3, 2000	Anderson Mesa	LONEOS	NYS	1.9 km	MPC · JPL
118603	2000 GU_{111}	—	April 3, 2000	Anderson Mesa	LONEOS	·	1.4 km	MPC · JPL
118604	2000 GL_{114}	—	April 7, 2000	Socorro	LINEAR	·	1.7 km	MPC · JPL
118605	2000 GR_{116}	—	April 2, 2000	Kitt Peak	Spacewatch	·	2.0 km	MPC · JPL
118606	2000 GG_{120}	—	April 5, 2000	Kitt Peak	Spacewatch	·	1.8 km	MPC · JPL
118607	2000 GG_{130}	—	April 5, 2000	Kitt Peak	Spacewatch	NYS	1.8 km	MPC · JPL
118608	2000 GQ_{134}	—	April 8, 2000	Socorro	LINEAR	·	2.7 km	MPC · JPL
118609	2000 GZ_{137}	—	April 4, 2000	Anderson Mesa	LONEOS	(6769)	2.2 km	MPC · JPL
118610	2000 GC_{143}	—	April 7, 2000	Anderson Mesa	LONEOS	·	2.5 km	MPC · JPL
118611	2000 GG_{143}	—	April 7, 2000	Anderson Mesa	LONEOS	V	1.6 km	MPC · JPL
118612	2000 GU_{143}	—	April 7, 2000	Anderson Mesa	LONEOS	V	1.5 km	MPC · JPL
118613	2000 GE_{150}	—	April 5, 2000	Socorro	LINEAR	·	1.6 km	MPC · JPL
118614	2000 GZ_{150}	—	April 5, 2000	Socorro	LINEAR	·	2.1 km	MPC · JPL
118615	2000 GT_{159}	—	April 7, 2000	Socorro	LINEAR	·	2.0 km	MPC · JPL
118616	2000 GV_{159}	—	April 7, 2000	Socorro	LINEAR	ERI	3.2 km	MPC · JPL
118617	2000 GP_{162}	—	April 8, 2000	Socorro	LINEAR	·	2.1 km	MPC · JPL
118618	2000 HB_{8}	—	April 27, 2000	Socorro	LINEAR	V · fast	1.2 km	MPC · JPL
118619	2000 HR_{9}	—	April 27, 2000	Socorro	LINEAR	·	2.2 km	MPC · JPL
118620	2000 HR_{13}	—	April 28, 2000	Socorro	LINEAR	NYS	2.4 km	MPC · JPL
118621	2000 HK_{16}	—	April 24, 2000	Kitt Peak	Spacewatch	NYS	1.9 km	MPC · JPL
118622	2000 HZ_{19}	—	April 27, 2000	Kitt Peak	Spacewatch	·	1.9 km	MPC · JPL
118623	2000 HJ_{22}	—	April 29, 2000	Socorro	LINEAR	·	2.4 km	MPC · JPL
118624	2000 HR_{24}	—	April 24, 2000	Anderson Mesa	LONEOS	L5	10 km	MPC · JPL
118625	2000 HF_{28}	—	April 28, 2000	Socorro	LINEAR	PHO	2.6 km	MPC · JPL
118626	2000 HJ_{29}	—	April 28, 2000	Socorro	LINEAR	·	2.9 km	MPC · JPL
118627	2000 HE_{36}	—	April 28, 2000	Socorro	LINEAR	PHO	2.4 km	MPC · JPL
118628	2000 HW_{40}	—	April 28, 2000	Socorro	LINEAR	·	2.7 km	MPC · JPL
118629	2000 HC_{42}	—	April 29, 2000	Socorro	LINEAR	MAS	1.7 km	MPC · JPL
118630	2000 HA_{47}	—	April 29, 2000	Socorro	LINEAR	·	2.3 km	MPC · JPL
118631	2000 HB_{48}	—	April 29, 2000	Socorro	LINEAR	·	3.4 km	MPC · JPL
118632	2000 HR_{48}	—	April 29, 2000	Socorro	LINEAR	·	2.5 km	MPC · JPL
118633	2000 HM_{57}	—	April 24, 2000	Anderson Mesa	LONEOS	NYS	3.1 km	MPC · JPL
118634	2000 HA_{58}	—	April 24, 2000	Kitt Peak	Spacewatch	·	980 m	MPC · JPL
118635	2000 HE_{60}	—	April 25, 2000	Anderson Mesa	LONEOS	·	1.9 km	MPC · JPL
118636	2000 HW_{64}	—	April 26, 2000	Anderson Mesa	LONEOS	·	3.2 km	MPC · JPL
118637	2000 HD_{66}	—	April 26, 2000	Anderson Mesa	LONEOS	·	2.4 km	MPC · JPL
118638	2000 HR_{71}	—	April 25, 2000	Anderson Mesa	LONEOS	·	2.8 km	MPC · JPL
118639	2000 HM_{73}	—	April 27, 2000	Anderson Mesa	LONEOS	·	2.2 km	MPC · JPL
118640	2000 HP_{94}	—	April 29, 2000	Socorro	LINEAR	V	1.2 km	MPC · JPL
118641	2000 HU_{95}	—	April 28, 2000	Socorro	LINEAR	NYS	2.0 km	MPC · JPL
118642	2000 HG_{102}	—	April 25, 2000	Kitt Peak	Spacewatch	·	2.0 km	MPC · JPL
118643	2000 JR_{1}	—	May 1, 2000	Socorro	LINEAR	·	2.6 km	MPC · JPL
118644	2000 JR_{5}	—	May 1, 2000	Socorro	LINEAR	ADE	3.9 km	MPC · JPL
118645	2000 JC_{14}	—	May 6, 2000	Socorro	LINEAR	·	1.9 km	MPC · JPL
118646	2000 JL_{26}	—	May 7, 2000	Socorro	LINEAR	·	1.5 km	MPC · JPL
118647	2000 JX_{29}	—	May 7, 2000	Socorro	LINEAR	·	1.5 km	MPC · JPL
118648	2000 JF_{31}	—	May 7, 2000	Socorro	LINEAR	·	2.8 km	MPC · JPL
118649	2000 JM_{32}	—	May 7, 2000	Socorro	LINEAR	·	2.5 km	MPC · JPL
118650	2000 JQ_{33}	—	May 7, 2000	Socorro	LINEAR	·	2.7 km	MPC · JPL
118651	2000 JV_{33}	—	May 7, 2000	Socorro	LINEAR	V	1.4 km	MPC · JPL
118652	2000 JM_{36}	—	May 7, 2000	Socorro	LINEAR	·	2.9 km	MPC · JPL
118653	2000 JU_{36}	—	May 7, 2000	Socorro	LINEAR	NYS	2.7 km	MPC · JPL
118654	2000 JE_{38}	—	May 7, 2000	Socorro	LINEAR	MAS	1.1 km	MPC · JPL
118655	2000 JB_{40}	—	May 7, 2000	Socorro	LINEAR	·	3.7 km	MPC · JPL
118656	2000 JR_{40}	—	May 5, 2000	Socorro	LINEAR	·	3.0 km	MPC · JPL
118657	2000 JA_{57}	—	May 6, 2000	Socorro	LINEAR	·	4.4 km	MPC · JPL
118658	2000 JO_{58}	—	May 6, 2000	Socorro	LINEAR	·	2.8 km	MPC · JPL
118659	2000 JH_{77}	—	May 7, 2000	Socorro	LINEAR	MAS	1.6 km	MPC · JPL
118660	2000 JK_{77}	—	May 7, 2000	Socorro	LINEAR	·	2.6 km	MPC · JPL
118661	2000 KL_{6}	—	May 27, 2000	Socorro	LINEAR	·	2.6 km	MPC · JPL
118662	2000 KD_{11}	—	May 28, 2000	Socorro	LINEAR	·	1.7 km	MPC · JPL
118663	2000 KK_{11}	—	May 28, 2000	Socorro	LINEAR	·	1.8 km	MPC · JPL
118664	2000 KP_{15}	—	May 28, 2000	Socorro	LINEAR	·	2.6 km	MPC · JPL
118665	2000 KE_{34}	—	May 27, 2000	Socorro	LINEAR	·	2.6 km	MPC · JPL
118666	2000 KZ_{34}	—	May 27, 2000	Socorro	LINEAR	·	3.4 km	MPC · JPL
118667	2000 KA_{40}	—	May 25, 2000	Kitt Peak	Spacewatch	·	2.6 km	MPC · JPL
118668	2000 KS_{43}	—	May 31, 2000	Kitt Peak	Spacewatch	·	2.7 km	MPC · JPL
118669	2000 KO_{54}	—	May 27, 2000	Anderson Mesa	LONEOS	EUN	2.1 km	MPC · JPL
118670	2000 KP_{55}	—	May 27, 2000	Socorro	LINEAR	PHO	2.8 km	MPC · JPL
118671	2000 KL_{63}	—	May 26, 2000	Anderson Mesa	LONEOS	·	2.8 km	MPC · JPL
118672	2000 KS_{63}	—	May 26, 2000	Anderson Mesa	LONEOS	·	2.5 km	MPC · JPL
118673	2000 KU_{68}	—	May 29, 2000	Kitt Peak	Spacewatch	·	1.9 km	MPC · JPL
118674	2000 KD_{78}	—	May 27, 2000	Socorro	LINEAR	·	2.8 km	MPC · JPL
118675	2000 KW_{81}	—	May 24, 2000	Anderson Mesa	LONEOS	V	1.6 km	MPC · JPL
118676	2000 LS_{17}	—	June 7, 2000	Socorro	LINEAR	·	3.7 km	MPC · JPL
118677	2000 LG_{19}	—	June 8, 2000	Socorro	LINEAR	·	2.7 km	MPC · JPL
118678	2000 LH_{22}	—	June 6, 2000	Kitt Peak	Spacewatch	RAF	2.1 km	MPC · JPL
118679	2000 LE_{35}	—	June 1, 2000	Haleakala	NEAT	EUN	2.2 km	MPC · JPL
118680	2000 LQ_{35}	—	June 1, 2000	Anderson Mesa	LONEOS	RAF	2.0 km	MPC · JPL
118681	2000 NJ_{1}	—	July 3, 2000	Kitt Peak	Spacewatch	(5)	2.4 km	MPC · JPL
118682	2000 NJ_{3}	—	July 7, 2000	Farpoint	Farpoint	·	2.8 km	MPC · JPL
118683	2000 NE_{11}	—	July 12, 2000	Ondřejov	P. Kušnirák	·	3.2 km	MPC · JPL
118684	2000 NX_{14}	—	July 5, 2000	Anderson Mesa	LONEOS	·	4.2 km	MPC · JPL
118685	2000 NV_{15}	—	July 5, 2000	Anderson Mesa	LONEOS	slow	4.1 km	MPC · JPL
118686	2000 NA_{20}	—	July 5, 2000	Anderson Mesa	LONEOS	·	3.1 km	MPC · JPL
118687	2000 NF_{22}	—	July 7, 2000	Socorro	LINEAR	MAS	1.6 km	MPC · JPL
118688	2000 NJ_{22}	—	July 7, 2000	Socorro	LINEAR	·	6.1 km	MPC · JPL
118689	2000 NG_{23}	—	July 5, 2000	Anderson Mesa	LONEOS	·	4.8 km	MPC · JPL
118690	2000 OO_{20}	—	July 30, 2000	Socorro	LINEAR	·	7.7 km	MPC · JPL
118691	2000 OJ_{23}	—	July 23, 2000	Socorro	LINEAR	·	3.1 km	MPC · JPL
118692	2000 OS_{28}	—	July 30, 2000	Socorro	LINEAR	MAR · slow	2.7 km	MPC · JPL
118693	2000 OL_{31}	—	July 30, 2000	Socorro	LINEAR	·	3.3 km	MPC · JPL
118694	2000 OG_{42}	—	July 30, 2000	Socorro	LINEAR	·	3.3 km	MPC · JPL
118695	2000 OW_{44}	—	July 30, 2000	Socorro	LINEAR	·	3.8 km	MPC · JPL
118696	2000 OA_{46}	—	July 30, 2000	Socorro	LINEAR	·	4.8 km	MPC · JPL
118697	2000 OL_{47}	—	July 31, 2000	Socorro	LINEAR	·	4.3 km	MPC · JPL
118698	2000 OY_{51}	—	July 28, 2000	Cerro Paranal	B. Gladman	res · 4:7	80 km	MPC · JPL
118699	2000 OK_{53}	—	July 30, 2000	Socorro	LINEAR	GEF	3.4 km	MPC · JPL
118700	2000 OQ_{53}	—	July 30, 2000	Socorro	LINEAR	MAR	4.0 km	MPC · JPL

== 118701–118800 ==
back to top

Designation			Discovery			Properties		Ref
Permanent	Provisional	Named after	Date	Site	Discoverer(s)	Category	Diam.	Ref
118701	2000 OW_{59}	—	July 29, 2000	Anderson Mesa	LONEOS	·	3.0 km	MPC · JPL
118702	2000 OM_{67}	—	July 31, 2000	Cerro Tololo	M. W. Buie, Kern, S. D.	SDO	179 km	MPC · JPL
118703	2000 PJ_{8}	—	August 4, 2000	Socorro	LINEAR	·	2.7 km	MPC · JPL
118704	2000 PK_{10}	—	August 1, 2000	Socorro	LINEAR	·	5.6 km	MPC · JPL
118705	2000 PJ_{16}	—	August 1, 2000	Socorro	LINEAR	·	3.5 km	MPC · JPL
118706	2000 PL_{17}	—	August 1, 2000	Socorro	LINEAR	·	3.0 km	MPC · JPL
118707	2000 PC_{20}	—	August 1, 2000	Socorro	LINEAR	·	2.6 km	MPC · JPL
118708	2000 PO_{21}	—	August 1, 2000	Socorro	LINEAR	·	3.1 km	MPC · JPL
118709	2000 QS_{5}	—	August 24, 2000	Socorro	LINEAR	·	3.6 km	MPC · JPL
118710	2000 QN_{12}	—	August 24, 2000	Socorro	LINEAR	·	2.2 km	MPC · JPL
118711	2000 QT_{15}	—	August 24, 2000	Socorro	LINEAR	HNS	2.5 km	MPC · JPL
118712	2000 QU_{16}	—	August 24, 2000	Socorro	LINEAR	·	3.6 km	MPC · JPL
118713	2000 QY_{22}	—	August 25, 2000	Socorro	LINEAR	·	3.3 km	MPC · JPL
118714	2000 QF_{27}	—	August 24, 2000	Socorro	LINEAR	·	4.6 km	MPC · JPL
118715	2000 QW_{35}	—	August 24, 2000	Socorro	LINEAR	·	3.2 km	MPC · JPL
118716	2000 QR_{46}	—	August 24, 2000	Socorro	LINEAR	·	3.3 km	MPC · JPL
118717	2000 QK_{48}	—	August 24, 2000	Socorro	LINEAR	·	3.3 km	MPC · JPL
118718	2000 QT_{49}	—	August 24, 2000	Socorro	LINEAR	·	2.9 km	MPC · JPL
118719	2000 QK_{55}	—	August 25, 2000	Socorro	LINEAR	·	3.4 km	MPC · JPL
118720	2000 QB_{58}	—	August 26, 2000	Socorro	LINEAR	NEM	5.3 km	MPC · JPL
118721	2000 QM_{63}	—	August 28, 2000	Socorro	LINEAR	·	4.1 km	MPC · JPL
118722	2000 QV_{64}	—	August 28, 2000	Socorro	LINEAR	WIT	2.4 km	MPC · JPL
118723	2000 QC_{79}	—	August 24, 2000	Socorro	LINEAR	·	4.0 km	MPC · JPL
118724	2000 QF_{79}	—	August 24, 2000	Socorro	LINEAR	·	3.7 km	MPC · JPL
118725	2000 QD_{82}	—	August 24, 2000	Socorro	LINEAR	·	4.6 km	MPC · JPL
118726	2000 QO_{85}	—	August 25, 2000	Socorro	LINEAR	·	3.7 km	MPC · JPL
118727	2000 QS_{89}	—	August 25, 2000	Socorro	LINEAR	DOR	4.5 km	MPC · JPL
118728	2000 QN_{93}	—	August 26, 2000	Socorro	LINEAR	·	2.3 km	MPC · JPL
118729	2000 QC_{95}	—	August 26, 2000	Socorro	LINEAR	·	3.3 km	MPC · JPL
118730	2000 QL_{100}	—	August 28, 2000	Socorro	LINEAR	·	3.9 km	MPC · JPL
118731	2000 QX_{115}	—	August 26, 2000	Socorro	LINEAR	·	5.8 km	MPC · JPL
118732	2000 QY_{123}	—	August 25, 2000	Socorro	LINEAR	VER	4.8 km	MPC · JPL
118733	2000 QN_{125}	—	August 31, 2000	Socorro	LINEAR	·	2.1 km	MPC · JPL
118734	2000 QO_{126}	—	August 31, 2000	Socorro	LINEAR	·	4.1 km	MPC · JPL
118735	2000 QM_{129}	—	August 30, 2000	Višnjan Observatory	K. Korlević	AGN	2.7 km	MPC · JPL
118736	2000 QF_{132}	—	August 26, 2000	Socorro	LINEAR	·	3.1 km	MPC · JPL
118737	2000 QZ_{132}	—	August 26, 2000	Socorro	LINEAR	·	2.5 km	MPC · JPL
118738	2000 QF_{134}	—	August 26, 2000	Socorro	LINEAR	·	2.6 km	MPC · JPL
118739	2000 QO_{135}	—	August 26, 2000	Socorro	LINEAR	·	3.5 km	MPC · JPL
118740	2000 QN_{137}	—	August 31, 2000	Socorro	LINEAR	·	2.5 km	MPC · JPL
118741	2000 QH_{141}	—	August 31, 2000	Socorro	LINEAR	·	3.9 km	MPC · JPL
118742	2000 QA_{145}	—	August 31, 2000	Socorro	LINEAR	·	3.9 km	MPC · JPL
118743	2000 QV_{146}	—	August 31, 2000	Socorro	LINEAR	·	3.6 km	MPC · JPL
118744	2000 QA_{155}	—	August 31, 2000	Socorro	LINEAR	·	3.0 km	MPC · JPL
118745	2000 QU_{155}	—	August 31, 2000	Socorro	LINEAR	·	4.2 km	MPC · JPL
118746	2000 QS_{156}	—	August 31, 2000	Socorro	LINEAR	·	3.7 km	MPC · JPL
118747	2000 QB_{162}	—	August 31, 2000	Socorro	LINEAR	·	2.4 km	MPC · JPL
118748	2000 QE_{164}	—	August 31, 2000	Socorro	LINEAR	HNS	2.0 km	MPC · JPL
118749	2000 QD_{171}	—	August 31, 2000	Socorro	LINEAR	·	3.8 km	MPC · JPL
118750	2000 QY_{171}	—	August 31, 2000	Socorro	LINEAR	·	3.7 km	MPC · JPL
118751	2000 QW_{178}	—	August 31, 2000	Socorro	LINEAR	·	3.5 km	MPC · JPL
118752	2000 QQ_{186}	—	August 26, 2000	Socorro	LINEAR	·	3.6 km	MPC · JPL
118753	2000 QP_{188}	—	August 26, 2000	Socorro	LINEAR	·	3.9 km	MPC · JPL
118754	2000 QA_{192}	—	August 26, 2000	Socorro	LINEAR	·	3.9 km	MPC · JPL
118755	2000 QT_{198}	—	August 29, 2000	Socorro	LINEAR	·	4.3 km	MPC · JPL
118756	2000 QK_{200}	—	August 29, 2000	Socorro	LINEAR	·	3.8 km	MPC · JPL
118757	2000 QE_{207}	—	August 31, 2000	Socorro	LINEAR	·	5.3 km	MPC · JPL
118758	2000 QZ_{207}	—	August 31, 2000	Socorro	LINEAR	BRA	2.6 km	MPC · JPL
118759	2000 QR_{213}	—	August 31, 2000	Socorro	LINEAR	·	3.1 km	MPC · JPL
118760	2000 QU_{213}	—	August 31, 2000	Socorro	LINEAR	MRX	2.1 km	MPC · JPL
118761	2000 QB_{220}	—	August 21, 2000	Anderson Mesa	LONEOS	·	3.8 km	MPC · JPL
118762	2000 QM_{222}	—	August 21, 2000	Anderson Mesa	LONEOS	·	4.0 km	MPC · JPL
118763	2000 QU_{222}	—	August 21, 2000	Anderson Mesa	LONEOS	·	4.7 km	MPC · JPL
118764	2000 QC_{224}	—	August 26, 2000	Socorro	LINEAR	·	3.6 km	MPC · JPL
118765	2000 QB_{225}	—	August 29, 2000	Socorro	LINEAR	·	3.8 km	MPC · JPL
118766	2000 QQ_{229}	—	August 31, 2000	Socorro	LINEAR	·	3.3 km	MPC · JPL
118767	2000 QG_{230}	—	August 31, 2000	Socorro	LINEAR	·	4.1 km	MPC · JPL
118768 Carlosnoriega	2000 QY_{233}	Carlosnoriega	August 25, 2000	Cerro Tololo	M. W. Buie	·	3.6 km	MPC · JPL
118769 Olivas	2000 QJ_{249}	Olivas	August 28, 2000	Cerro Tololo	M. W. Buie	·	3.8 km	MPC · JPL
118770	2000 RY_{4}	—	September 1, 2000	Socorro	LINEAR	·	4.1 km	MPC · JPL
118771	2000 RY_{18}	—	September 1, 2000	Socorro	LINEAR	·	3.9 km	MPC · JPL
118772	2000 RL_{20}	—	September 1, 2000	Socorro	LINEAR	·	4.3 km	MPC · JPL
118773	2000 RH_{34}	—	September 1, 2000	Socorro	LINEAR	·	4.8 km	MPC · JPL
118774	2000 RH_{35}	—	September 1, 2000	Socorro	LINEAR	·	3.9 km	MPC · JPL
118775	2000 RR_{37}	—	September 3, 2000	Socorro	LINEAR	·	6.3 km	MPC · JPL
118776	2000 RB_{58}	—	September 7, 2000	Kitt Peak	Spacewatch	·	5.8 km	MPC · JPL
118777	2000 RW_{59}	—	September 7, 2000	Ondřejov	P. Kušnirák	·	3.8 km	MPC · JPL
118778	2000 RW_{62}	—	September 2, 2000	Socorro	LINEAR	EUN	3.2 km	MPC · JPL
118779	2000 RJ_{68}	—	September 2, 2000	Socorro	LINEAR	·	3.5 km	MPC · JPL
118780	2000 RM_{79}	—	September 1, 2000	Socorro	LINEAR	·	3.5 km	MPC · JPL
118781	2000 RN_{79}	—	September 1, 2000	Socorro	LINEAR	·	4.0 km	MPC · JPL
118782	2000 RP_{80}	—	September 1, 2000	Socorro	LINEAR	·	3.4 km	MPC · JPL
118783	2000 RJ_{81}	—	September 1, 2000	Socorro	LINEAR	·	3.7 km	MPC · JPL
118784	2000 RX_{85}	—	September 2, 2000	Socorro	LINEAR	DOR	7.2 km	MPC · JPL
118785	2000 RJ_{90}	—	September 3, 2000	Socorro	LINEAR	·	3.4 km	MPC · JPL
118786	2000 RJ_{98}	—	September 5, 2000	Anderson Mesa	LONEOS	·	2.7 km	MPC · JPL
118787	2000 RA_{99}	—	September 5, 2000	Anderson Mesa	LONEOS	JUN	3.3 km	MPC · JPL
118788	2000 RN_{99}	—	September 5, 2000	Anderson Mesa	LONEOS	·	2.5 km	MPC · JPL
118789	2000 RM_{101}	—	September 5, 2000	Anderson Mesa	LONEOS	·	5.2 km	MPC · JPL
118790	2000 RD_{104}	—	September 6, 2000	Socorro	LINEAR	EUN	3.1 km	MPC · JPL
118791	2000 SP_{6}	—	September 21, 2000	Socorro	LINEAR	·	4.0 km	MPC · JPL
118792	2000 SZ_{14}	—	September 23, 2000	Socorro	LINEAR	HOF	4.4 km	MPC · JPL
118793	2000 SV_{26}	—	September 23, 2000	Socorro	LINEAR	·	3.2 km	MPC · JPL
118794	2000 SJ_{28}	—	September 23, 2000	Socorro	LINEAR	·	3.4 km	MPC · JPL
118795	2000 SO_{29}	—	September 24, 2000	Socorro	LINEAR	·	2.3 km	MPC · JPL
118796	2000 SE_{30}	—	September 24, 2000	Socorro	LINEAR	KOR	2.6 km	MPC · JPL
118797	2000 SU_{31}	—	September 24, 2000	Socorro	LINEAR	AGN	2.3 km	MPC · JPL
118798	2000 SR_{32}	—	September 24, 2000	Socorro	LINEAR	·	3.5 km	MPC · JPL
118799	2000 SQ_{35}	—	September 24, 2000	Socorro	LINEAR	·	3.8 km	MPC · JPL
118800	2000 SC_{41}	—	September 24, 2000	Socorro	LINEAR	·	4.1 km	MPC · JPL

== 118801–118900 ==
back to top

Designation			Discovery			Properties		Ref
Permanent	Provisional	Named after	Date	Site	Discoverer(s)	Category	Diam.	Ref
118801	2000 SY_{43}	—	September 23, 2000	Socorro	LINEAR	·	6.8 km	MPC · JPL
118802	2000 SG_{47}	—	September 23, 2000	Socorro	LINEAR	·	5.3 km	MPC · JPL
118803	2000 SC_{48}	—	September 23, 2000	Socorro	LINEAR	·	3.8 km	MPC · JPL
118804	2000 SN_{54}	—	September 24, 2000	Socorro	LINEAR	·	3.5 km	MPC · JPL
118805	2000 SB_{56}	—	September 24, 2000	Socorro	LINEAR	·	3.8 km	MPC · JPL
118806	2000 SO_{57}	—	September 24, 2000	Socorro	LINEAR	·	2.7 km	MPC · JPL
118807	2000 SC_{58}	—	September 24, 2000	Socorro	LINEAR	·	4.1 km	MPC · JPL
118808	2000 SZ_{59}	—	September 24, 2000	Socorro	LINEAR	·	3.5 km	MPC · JPL
118809	2000 SE_{65}	—	September 24, 2000	Socorro	LINEAR	PAD	3.2 km	MPC · JPL
118810	2000 SD_{69}	—	September 24, 2000	Socorro	LINEAR	KOR	2.6 km	MPC · JPL
118811	2000 SS_{73}	—	September 24, 2000	Socorro	LINEAR	·	4.4 km	MPC · JPL
118812	2000 SG_{80}	—	September 24, 2000	Socorro	LINEAR	·	5.3 km	MPC · JPL
118813	2000 ST_{80}	—	September 24, 2000	Socorro	LINEAR	RAF	2.3 km	MPC · JPL
118814	2000 SB_{97}	—	September 23, 2000	Socorro	LINEAR	ADE	5.1 km	MPC · JPL
118815	2000 SM_{108}	—	September 24, 2000	Socorro	LINEAR	L5	18 km	MPC · JPL
118816	2000 SA_{109}	—	September 24, 2000	Socorro	LINEAR	·	4.1 km	MPC · JPL
118817	2000 SC_{119}	—	September 24, 2000	Socorro	LINEAR	·	3.8 km	MPC · JPL
118818	2000 SJ_{119}	—	September 24, 2000	Socorro	LINEAR	·	4.5 km	MPC · JPL
118819	2000 SW_{129}	—	September 22, 2000	Socorro	LINEAR	MAR	2.4 km	MPC · JPL
118820	2000 SO_{131}	—	September 22, 2000	Socorro	LINEAR	·	3.9 km	MPC · JPL
118821	2000 SM_{137}	—	September 23, 2000	Socorro	LINEAR	·	3.8 km	MPC · JPL
118822	2000 SP_{137}	—	September 23, 2000	Socorro	LINEAR	·	5.8 km	MPC · JPL
118823	2000 SH_{139}	—	September 23, 2000	Socorro	LINEAR	·	3.7 km	MPC · JPL
118824	2000 SY_{142}	—	September 23, 2000	Socorro	LINEAR	·	3.9 km	MPC · JPL
118825	2000 SY_{153}	—	September 24, 2000	Socorro	LINEAR	·	7.4 km	MPC · JPL
118826	2000 SV_{154}	—	September 24, 2000	Socorro	LINEAR	THM	5.2 km	MPC · JPL
118827	2000 SY_{159}	—	September 22, 2000	Socorro	LINEAR	·	4.4 km	MPC · JPL
118828	2000 SF_{163}	—	September 29, 2000	Ondřejov	P. Kušnirák, P. Pravec	·	5.4 km	MPC · JPL
118829 Jindřichštreit	2000 SJ_{163}	Jindřichštreit	September 30, 2000	Ondřejov	P. Pravec, P. Kušnirák	·	8.5 km	MPC · JPL
118830	2000 SS_{169}	—	September 24, 2000	Socorro	LINEAR	·	3.1 km	MPC · JPL
118831	2000 SX_{171}	—	September 27, 2000	Socorro	LINEAR	·	2.3 km	MPC · JPL
118832	2000 SF_{174}	—	September 28, 2000	Socorro	LINEAR	·	4.6 km	MPC · JPL
118833	2000 SL_{180}	—	September 28, 2000	Socorro	LINEAR	EOS	3.6 km	MPC · JPL
118834	2000 SY_{186}	—	September 21, 2000	Haleakala	NEAT	EUN	2.9 km	MPC · JPL
118835	2000 SM_{190}	—	September 23, 2000	Socorro	LINEAR	·	3.6 km	MPC · JPL
118836	2000 SP_{197}	—	September 24, 2000	Socorro	LINEAR	·	3.0 km	MPC · JPL
118837	2000 SQ_{202}	—	September 24, 2000	Socorro	LINEAR	·	3.8 km	MPC · JPL
118838	2000 SO_{205}	—	September 24, 2000	Socorro	LINEAR	KOR	2.4 km	MPC · JPL
118839	2000 SA_{208}	—	September 24, 2000	Socorro	LINEAR	·	5.6 km	MPC · JPL
118840	2000 SM_{213}	—	September 25, 2000	Socorro	LINEAR	·	4.7 km	MPC · JPL
118841	2000 SR_{228}	—	September 28, 2000	Socorro	LINEAR	KOR	2.3 km	MPC · JPL
118842	2000 SN_{229}	—	September 28, 2000	Socorro	LINEAR	·	2.7 km	MPC · JPL
118843	2000 SW_{239}	—	September 28, 2000	Socorro	LINEAR	·	2.8 km	MPC · JPL
118844	2000 ST_{242}	—	September 24, 2000	Socorro	LINEAR	·	3.7 km	MPC · JPL
118845	2000 SP_{245}	—	September 24, 2000	Socorro	LINEAR	·	3.4 km	MPC · JPL
118846	2000 SU_{245}	—	September 24, 2000	Socorro	LINEAR	·	1.8 km	MPC · JPL
118847	2000 SF_{248}	—	September 24, 2000	Socorro	LINEAR	·	4.4 km	MPC · JPL
118848	2000 SZ_{248}	—	September 24, 2000	Socorro	LINEAR	·	4.4 km	MPC · JPL
118849	2000 SJ_{254}	—	September 24, 2000	Socorro	LINEAR	·	4.1 km	MPC · JPL
118850	2000 SL_{257}	—	September 24, 2000	Socorro	LINEAR	·	2.2 km	MPC · JPL
118851	2000 SX_{270}	—	September 27, 2000	Socorro	LINEAR	·	5.3 km	MPC · JPL
118852	2000 SV_{276}	—	September 30, 2000	Socorro	LINEAR	TIR	6.5 km	MPC · JPL
118853	2000 SZ_{286}	—	September 26, 2000	Socorro	LINEAR	·	3.6 km	MPC · JPL
118854	2000 ST_{289}	—	September 27, 2000	Socorro	LINEAR	·	3.3 km	MPC · JPL
118855	2000 SC_{298}	—	September 28, 2000	Socorro	LINEAR	(16286)	3.5 km	MPC · JPL
118856	2000 SS_{299}	—	September 28, 2000	Socorro	LINEAR	URS	5.8 km	MPC · JPL
118857	2000 SZ_{309}	—	September 26, 2000	Socorro	LINEAR	HNS	3.6 km	MPC · JPL
118858	2000 SM_{311}	—	September 27, 2000	Socorro	LINEAR	·	4.7 km	MPC · JPL
118859	2000 SO_{316}	—	September 30, 2000	Socorro	LINEAR	EUN	2.7 km	MPC · JPL
118860	2000 SW_{318}	—	September 26, 2000	Socorro	LINEAR	·	5.1 km	MPC · JPL
118861	2000 SM_{319}	—	September 26, 2000	Socorro	LINEAR	EUN	2.7 km	MPC · JPL
118862	2000 SK_{343}	—	September 23, 2000	Socorro	LINEAR	·	3.7 km	MPC · JPL
118863	2000 SK_{349}	—	September 30, 2000	Anderson Mesa	LONEOS	·	9.0 km	MPC · JPL
118864	2000 SQ_{351}	—	September 29, 2000	Anderson Mesa	LONEOS	·	5.4 km	MPC · JPL
118865	2000 SP_{354}	—	September 29, 2000	Anderson Mesa	LONEOS	·	4.5 km	MPC · JPL
118866	2000 SS_{354}	—	September 29, 2000	Anderson Mesa	LONEOS	·	3.2 km	MPC · JPL
118867	2000 SB_{355}	—	September 29, 2000	Anderson Mesa	LONEOS	·	2.4 km	MPC · JPL
118868	2000 ST_{360}	—	September 21, 2000	Anderson Mesa	LONEOS	·	4.1 km	MPC · JPL
118869	2000 SS_{362}	—	September 20, 2000	Socorro	LINEAR	·	5.5 km	MPC · JPL
118870	2000 TE_{8}	—	October 1, 2000	Socorro	LINEAR	AGN	2.2 km	MPC · JPL
118871	2000 TZ_{12}	—	October 1, 2000	Socorro	LINEAR	·	3.5 km	MPC · JPL
118872	2000 TW_{13}	—	October 1, 2000	Socorro	LINEAR	·	3.3 km	MPC · JPL
118873	2000 TY_{14}	—	October 1, 2000	Socorro	LINEAR	·	2.1 km	MPC · JPL
118874	2000 TK_{28}	—	October 3, 2000	Socorro	LINEAR	VER	4.3 km	MPC · JPL
118875	2000 TD_{29}	—	October 3, 2000	Socorro	LINEAR	·	2.5 km	MPC · JPL
118876	2000 TB_{41}	—	October 1, 2000	Anderson Mesa	LONEOS	·	5.3 km	MPC · JPL
118877	2000 TM_{44}	—	October 1, 2000	Socorro	LINEAR	·	3.3 km	MPC · JPL
118878	2000 TT_{49}	—	October 1, 2000	Socorro	LINEAR	·	3.9 km	MPC · JPL
118879	2000 TT_{54}	—	October 1, 2000	Socorro	LINEAR	·	4.0 km	MPC · JPL
118880	2000 TJ_{57}	—	October 2, 2000	Anderson Mesa	LONEOS	EUN	2.4 km	MPC · JPL
118881	2000 TK_{57}	—	October 2, 2000	Anderson Mesa	LONEOS	MAR	2.4 km	MPC · JPL
118882	2000 TL_{59}	—	October 2, 2000	Anderson Mesa	LONEOS	EUN	2.6 km	MPC · JPL
118883	2000 US_{4}	—	October 24, 2000	Socorro	LINEAR	·	5.7 km	MPC · JPL
118884	2000 UN_{12}	—	October 24, 2000	Socorro	LINEAR	·	4.1 km	MPC · JPL
118885	2000 UZ_{23}	—	October 24, 2000	Socorro	LINEAR	·	4.8 km	MPC · JPL
118886	2000 UL_{27}	—	October 24, 2000	Socorro	LINEAR	EOS	4.4 km	MPC · JPL
118887	2000 UH_{35}	—	October 24, 2000	Socorro	LINEAR	TEL	2.1 km	MPC · JPL
118888	2000 UX_{35}	—	October 24, 2000	Socorro	LINEAR	·	3.1 km	MPC · JPL
118889	2000 UJ_{38}	—	October 24, 2000	Socorro	LINEAR	·	3.9 km	MPC · JPL
118890	2000 UM_{41}	—	October 24, 2000	Socorro	LINEAR	·	8.9 km	MPC · JPL
118891	2000 UA_{44}	—	October 24, 2000	Socorro	LINEAR	·	4.7 km	MPC · JPL
118892	2000 UE_{44}	—	October 24, 2000	Socorro	LINEAR	·	4.9 km	MPC · JPL
118893	2000 UU_{46}	—	October 24, 2000	Socorro	LINEAR	·	2.6 km	MPC · JPL
118894	2000 UW_{46}	—	October 24, 2000	Socorro	LINEAR	·	4.8 km	MPC · JPL
118895	2000 UO_{53}	—	October 24, 2000	Socorro	LINEAR	·	6.5 km	MPC · JPL
118896	2000 UQ_{59}	—	October 25, 2000	Socorro	LINEAR	·	5.0 km	MPC · JPL
118897	2000 UR_{60}	—	October 25, 2000	Socorro	LINEAR	·	4.1 km	MPC · JPL
118898	2000 UV_{62}	—	October 25, 2000	Socorro	LINEAR	·	4.2 km	MPC · JPL
118899	2000 UF_{66}	—	October 25, 2000	Socorro	LINEAR	·	2.6 km	MPC · JPL
118900	2000 UA_{67}	—	October 25, 2000	Socorro	LINEAR	·	5.6 km	MPC · JPL

== 118901–119000 ==
back to top

Designation			Discovery			Properties		Ref
Permanent	Provisional	Named after	Date	Site	Discoverer(s)	Category	Diam.	Ref
118901	2000 UH_{67}	—	October 25, 2000	Socorro	LINEAR	EOS	3.4 km	MPC · JPL
118902	2000 UU_{67}	—	October 25, 2000	Socorro	LINEAR	·	5.0 km	MPC · JPL
118903	2000 US_{72}	—	October 25, 2000	Socorro	LINEAR	·	6.8 km	MPC · JPL
118904	2000 UT_{86}	—	October 31, 2000	Socorro	LINEAR	·	3.0 km	MPC · JPL
118905	2000 UM_{87}	—	October 31, 2000	Socorro	LINEAR	·	4.5 km	MPC · JPL
118906	2000 UE_{93}	—	October 25, 2000	Socorro	LINEAR	·	4.5 km	MPC · JPL
118907	2000 UJ_{95}	—	October 25, 2000	Socorro	LINEAR	·	3.2 km	MPC · JPL
118908	2000 UA_{98}	—	October 25, 2000	Socorro	LINEAR	EOS	4.0 km	MPC · JPL
118909	2000 UE_{106}	—	October 30, 2000	Socorro	LINEAR	EOS	3.5 km	MPC · JPL
118910	2000 UR_{111}	—	October 29, 2000	Kitt Peak	Spacewatch	KOR	2.3 km	MPC · JPL
118911	2000 VL_{2}	—	November 1, 2000	Socorro	LINEAR	H	1.9 km	MPC · JPL
118912	2000 VN_{16}	—	November 1, 2000	Socorro	LINEAR	·	5.6 km	MPC · JPL
118913	2000 VM_{18}	—	November 1, 2000	Socorro	LINEAR	·	5.6 km	MPC · JPL
118914	2000 VV_{18}	—	November 1, 2000	Socorro	LINEAR	·	7.2 km	MPC · JPL
118915	2000 VM_{25}	—	November 1, 2000	Socorro	LINEAR	THM	4.9 km	MPC · JPL
118916	2000 VR_{25}	—	November 1, 2000	Socorro	LINEAR	·	3.5 km	MPC · JPL
118917	2000 VU_{26}	—	November 1, 2000	Socorro	LINEAR	·	4.1 km	MPC · JPL
118918	2000 VY_{26}	—	November 1, 2000	Socorro	LINEAR	·	5.7 km	MPC · JPL
118919	2000 VR_{27}	—	November 1, 2000	Socorro	LINEAR	·	4.1 km	MPC · JPL
118920	2000 VH_{31}	—	November 1, 2000	Socorro	LINEAR	·	3.5 km	MPC · JPL
118921	2000 VP_{45}	—	November 2, 2000	Socorro	LINEAR	KOR	2.6 km	MPC · JPL
118922	2000 VE_{48}	—	November 2, 2000	Socorro	LINEAR	·	4.5 km	MPC · JPL
118923	2000 VM_{51}	—	November 3, 2000	Socorro	LINEAR	·	2.6 km	MPC · JPL
118924	2000 VG_{53}	—	November 3, 2000	Socorro	LINEAR	·	4.2 km	MPC · JPL
118925	2000 VH_{59}	—	November 6, 2000	Socorro	LINEAR	H	1.3 km	MPC · JPL
118926	2000 VT_{59}	—	November 1, 2000	Kitt Peak	Spacewatch	KOR	2.2 km	MPC · JPL
118927	2000 WQ_{2}	—	November 19, 2000	Kitt Peak	Spacewatch	HYG	4.2 km	MPC · JPL
118928	2000 WB_{3}	—	November 19, 2000	Socorro	LINEAR	H	1.3 km	MPC · JPL
118929	2000 WK_{5}	—	November 19, 2000	Socorro	LINEAR	·	4.5 km	MPC · JPL
118930	2000 WB_{8}	—	November 20, 2000	Socorro	LINEAR	·	6.3 km	MPC · JPL
118931	2000 WD_{21}	—	November 24, 2000	Bohyunsan	Jeon, Y.-B., Lee, B.-C.	·	2.5 km	MPC · JPL
118932	2000 WC_{24}	—	November 20, 2000	Socorro	LINEAR	EOS	4.0 km	MPC · JPL
118933	2000 WA_{27}	—	November 26, 2000	Desert Beaver	W. K. Y. Yeung	·	4.2 km	MPC · JPL
118934	2000 WG_{31}	—	November 20, 2000	Socorro	LINEAR	HYG	6.4 km	MPC · JPL
118935	2000 WE_{42}	—	November 21, 2000	Socorro	LINEAR	·	7.9 km	MPC · JPL
118936	2000 WT_{43}	—	November 21, 2000	Socorro	LINEAR	EOS	4.3 km	MPC · JPL
118937	2000 WT_{46}	—	November 21, 2000	Socorro	LINEAR	EOS	4.6 km	MPC · JPL
118938	2000 WM_{47}	—	November 21, 2000	Socorro	LINEAR	·	7.9 km	MPC · JPL
118939	2000 WL_{51}	—	November 27, 2000	Kitt Peak	Spacewatch	HYG	6.0 km	MPC · JPL
118940	2000 WH_{58}	—	November 21, 2000	Socorro	LINEAR	·	4.1 km	MPC · JPL
118941	2000 WW_{60}	—	November 21, 2000	Socorro	LINEAR	T_{j} (2.99)	9.6 km	MPC · JPL
118942	2000 WK_{62}	—	November 23, 2000	Haleakala	NEAT	·	9.1 km	MPC · JPL
118943	2000 WF_{67}	—	November 26, 2000	Socorro	LINEAR	H	960 m	MPC · JPL
118944	2000 WU_{67}	—	November 20, 2000	Anderson Mesa	LONEOS	·	7.7 km	MPC · JPL
118945 Rikhill	2000 WS_{68}	Rikhill	November 29, 2000	Junk Bond	D. Healy	·	7.6 km	MPC · JPL
118946	2000 WQ_{69}	—	November 19, 2000	Socorro	LINEAR	EOS	3.1 km	MPC · JPL
118947	2000 WV_{69}	—	November 19, 2000	Socorro	LINEAR	·	6.2 km	MPC · JPL
118948	2000 WN_{83}	—	November 20, 2000	Socorro	LINEAR	URS	7.2 km	MPC · JPL
118949	2000 WM_{88}	—	November 20, 2000	Socorro	LINEAR	TIR	5.7 km	MPC · JPL
118950	2000 WG_{89}	—	November 21, 2000	Socorro	LINEAR	·	3.1 km	MPC · JPL
118951	2000 WU_{89}	—	November 21, 2000	Socorro	LINEAR	·	3.9 km	MPC · JPL
118952	2000 WA_{92}	—	November 21, 2000	Socorro	LINEAR	·	3.3 km	MPC · JPL
118953	2000 WN_{94}	—	November 21, 2000	Socorro	LINEAR	·	6.4 km	MPC · JPL
118954	2000 WR_{99}	—	November 21, 2000	Socorro	LINEAR	HYG	6.9 km	MPC · JPL
118955	2000 WU_{100}	—	November 21, 2000	Socorro	LINEAR	·	4.7 km	MPC · JPL
118956	2000 WA_{103}	—	November 26, 2000	Socorro	LINEAR	·	6.9 km	MPC · JPL
118957	2000 WE_{115}	—	November 20, 2000	Socorro	LINEAR	TIR	7.1 km	MPC · JPL
118958	2000 WR_{121}	—	November 26, 2000	Socorro	LINEAR	·	5.6 km	MPC · JPL
118959	2000 WO_{124}	—	November 19, 2000	Socorro	LINEAR	H	1.8 km	MPC · JPL
118960	2000 WQ_{124}	—	November 20, 2000	Socorro	LINEAR	H	1.3 km	MPC · JPL
118961	2000 WO_{125}	—	November 29, 2000	Socorro	LINEAR	·	6.7 km	MPC · JPL
118962	2000 WK_{129}	—	November 19, 2000	Kitt Peak	Spacewatch	VER	6.4 km	MPC · JPL
118963	2000 WY_{132}	—	November 19, 2000	Socorro	LINEAR	·	8.2 km	MPC · JPL
118964	2000 WW_{133}	—	November 19, 2000	Socorro	LINEAR	·	4.4 km	MPC · JPL
118965	2000 WA_{138}	—	November 21, 2000	Socorro	LINEAR	·	5.8 km	MPC · JPL
118966	2000 WJ_{141}	—	November 19, 2000	Socorro	LINEAR	H	1.3 km	MPC · JPL
118967	2000 WL_{144}	—	November 21, 2000	Socorro	LINEAR	GEF	3.2 km	MPC · JPL
118968	2000 WP_{150}	—	November 19, 2000	Socorro	LINEAR	H	1.3 km	MPC · JPL
118969	2000 WC_{156}	—	November 30, 2000	Socorro	LINEAR	·	3.9 km	MPC · JPL
118970	2000 WE_{160}	—	November 20, 2000	Kitt Peak	Spacewatch	THM	6.3 km	MPC · JPL
118971	2000 WR_{162}	—	November 20, 2000	Anderson Mesa	LONEOS	·	5.7 km	MPC · JPL
118972	2000 WV_{171}	—	November 25, 2000	Socorro	LINEAR	·	5.8 km	MPC · JPL
118973	2000 WD_{173}	—	November 25, 2000	Anderson Mesa	LONEOS	·	9.2 km	MPC · JPL
118974	2000 WU_{173}	—	November 26, 2000	Socorro	LINEAR	·	5.9 km	MPC · JPL
118975	2000 WB_{180}	—	November 27, 2000	Socorro	LINEAR	THM	5.5 km	MPC · JPL
118976	2000 WL_{181}	—	November 30, 2000	Anderson Mesa	LONEOS	·	3.3 km	MPC · JPL
118977	2000 WQ_{183}	—	November 21, 2000	Haute Provence	Haute Provence	THM	5.0 km	MPC · JPL
118978	2000 WW_{196}	—	November 20, 2000	Socorro	LINEAR	·	2.7 km	MPC · JPL
118979	2000 XM_{6}	—	December 1, 2000	Socorro	LINEAR	EUP	7.1 km	MPC · JPL
118980	2000 XC_{11}	—	December 1, 2000	Socorro	LINEAR	HNS · slow	2.9 km	MPC · JPL
118981	2000 XS_{13}	—	December 4, 2000	Socorro	LINEAR	H	1.2 km	MPC · JPL
118982	2000 XK_{14}	—	December 5, 2000	Bisei SG Center	BATTeRS	·	5.0 km	MPC · JPL
118983	2000 XB_{19}	—	December 4, 2000	Socorro	LINEAR	·	6.4 km	MPC · JPL
118984	2000 XC_{21}	—	December 4, 2000	Socorro	LINEAR	·	5.9 km	MPC · JPL
118985	2000 XW_{26}	—	December 4, 2000	Socorro	LINEAR	·	6.4 km	MPC · JPL
118986	2000 XM_{30}	—	December 4, 2000	Socorro	LINEAR	EMA	6.5 km	MPC · JPL
118987	2000 XZ_{41}	—	December 5, 2000	Socorro	LINEAR	(58892)	6.4 km	MPC · JPL
118988	2000 XS_{44}	—	December 5, 2000	Socorro	LINEAR	H	1.3 km	MPC · JPL
118989	2000 XO_{47}	—	December 4, 2000	Socorro	LINEAR	·	2.9 km	MPC · JPL
118990	2000 XW_{48}	—	December 4, 2000	Socorro	LINEAR	EOS	3.7 km	MPC · JPL
118991	2000 YC_{5}	—	December 19, 2000	Socorro	LINEAR	H	1.1 km	MPC · JPL
118992	2000 YW_{6}	—	December 20, 2000	Socorro	LINEAR	CLO	5.1 km	MPC · JPL
118993	2000 YL_{12}	—	December 22, 2000	Ondřejov	P. Kušnirák, P. Pravec	·	5.1 km	MPC · JPL
118994	2000 YS_{28}	—	December 28, 2000	Socorro	LINEAR	H	940 m	MPC · JPL
118995	2000 YH_{34}	—	December 28, 2000	Socorro	LINEAR	·	6.3 km	MPC · JPL
118996	2000 YF_{38}	—	December 30, 2000	Socorro	LINEAR	·	7.0 km	MPC · JPL
118997	2000 YU_{39}	—	December 30, 2000	Socorro	LINEAR	THM	5.5 km	MPC · JPL
118998	2000 YC_{40}	—	December 30, 2000	Socorro	LINEAR	THM	5.3 km	MPC · JPL
118999	2000 YJ_{51}	—	December 30, 2000	Socorro	LINEAR	HYG	6.9 km	MPC · JPL
119000	2000 YV_{55}	—	December 30, 2000	Socorro	LINEAR	·	11 km	MPC · JPL

back to top

== See also ==
- Meanings of minor-planet names: 118001–119000
