= Barmen, Agder =

Island in Agder, Norway

Barmen
- Interactive map of the island

Geography
- Location: Agder, Norway
- Coordinates: 58.7330°N 09.1675°E
- Area: 9 km^{2} (3.5 sq mi)
- Length: 8 km (5 mi)
- Width: 1.8 km (1.12 mi)
- Coastline: 19 km (11.8 mi)

Administration
- Norway
- County: Agder
- Municipality: Risør Municipality

Barmen is an island in Risør Municipality in Agder county, Norway. The 9-square-kilometre (3.5 sq mi) island lies in the middle of the Søndeledfjorden, separating the fjord into the Nordfjorden to the north and the Sørfjorden to the south. The island is separated from the mainland by a very narrow channel on the southwest corner of the island where there is a short bridge. The bridge is the only road access to the island. Most of the homes on the island are on the southern and western shores. The island is very hilly and forested.

== See also ==
- List of islands of Norway
