= Nordfjorden (Agder) =

Fjord in Agder, Norway

- Interactive map of the fjord
- Location: Agder county, Norway
- Coordinates: 58.7431°N 09.1297°E
- Type: Fjord
- Primary outflows: Søndeledfjorden
- Basin countries: Norway
- Max. length: 7 kilometres (4.3 mi)

Nordfjorden is part of Søndeledfjorden in Risør Municipality in Agder county, Norway. It lies on the north side of the island of Barmen, which is northwest of the town of Risør. Nordfjorden is a little over 7 kilometres (4.3 mi) long. The widest parts are where the Søndeledfjorden goes west and to the village of Søndeled and when the Rødsfjorden joins the Sørfjorden which is on the south side of Barmen island. The south side of the fjord is a relatively straight coastline, but on the north of the fjord there are many coves and bays. The largest of these are Kjødvika and Sivikkilen.

== See also ==
- List of Norwegian fjords
