= Fie, Norway =

Village in Risør Municipality, Norway

Fie
- Village
- Interactive map of Fie
- Coordinates: 58.6844°N 09.2107°E
- Country: Norway
- Region: Southern Norway
- County: Agder
- District: Østre Agder
- Municipality: Risør Municipality
- Elevation: 9 m (30 ft)
- Time zone: UTC+01:00 (CET)
  - Summer (DST): UTC+02:00 (CEST)
- Post Code: 4950 Risør

Fie is a village in Risør Municipality in Agder county, Norway. The village is located near the Skagerrak coastline in southeastern Norway. The village sits just north of the coastal village of Krabbesund, about 3 kilometres (1.9 mi) east of the village of Sandnes, and about 3 kilometres (1.9 mi) south of the town of Risør, located across the nearby Sandnesfjorden.
