= Stangholmen Lighthouse =

Coastal lighthouse in Norway

Stangholmen lighthouse
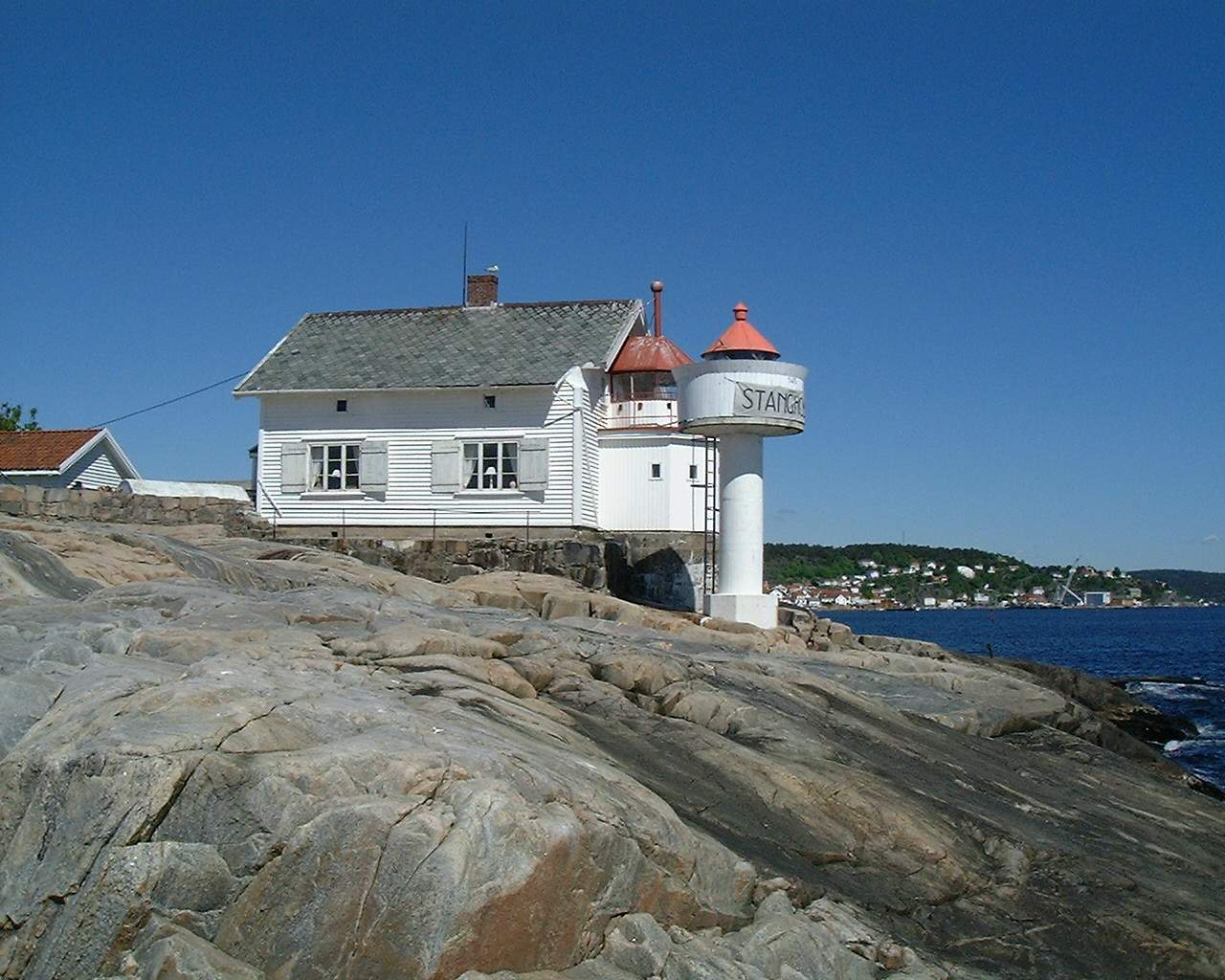
- View of the old and new lighthouse
- Location: Risør, Norway
- Coordinates: 58°42′34″N 9°14′36″E

Tower
- Constructed: 1855
- Construction: Concrete
- Automated: 1959
- Height: 8.5 m (28 ft)
- Shape: Cylindrical
- Markings: White, red top

Light
- First lit: 1959
- Focal height: 9 m (30 ft)
- Range: 2.1 nmi (3.9 km; 2.4 mi) (red), 1.9 nmi (3.5 km; 2.2 mi) (green), 3.3 nmi (6.1 km; 3.8 mi) (white)
- Characteristic: Oc WRG 6s
- Norway no.: 054500

Stangholmen Lighthouse (Norwegian: Stangholmen fyrstasjon) is a coastal lighthouse in Risør Municipality in Agder county, Norway. The lighthouse marks the channel from the Skagerrak, through several islands to the mainland town of Risør which sits at the end of a peninsula between the Søndeledfjorden and the Sandnesfjorden. The lighthouse was first built in 1855 and in 1959, a new, automated light was constructed which is still in use to this day. The light is located on the small island of Stangholmen. It is only accessible by boat. The site is open to the public but the buildings are not.

The white, cylindrical concrete tower has a red roof on top. The 8.5-metre (28 ft) tall tower sits at an elevation of 9 metres (30 ft) above sea level. The light emits a white, red, or green light (depending on direction) occulting once every 6 seconds. The red light can be seen for up to 2.1 nautical miles (3.9 km; 2.4 mi), the green light can be seen for up to 1.9 nautical miles (3.5 km; 2.2 mi), and the white light can be seen for up to 3.3 nautical miles (6.1 km; 3.8 mi). Each light can only be seen from certain directions.

== History ==
The first lighthouse at Stangholmen was built in 1855. It was an 8-metre (26 ft) tall white, square tower that was attached to a 1-1/2 story keeper's house. The lighthouse was closed in 1959 when the long-time keeper retired. The present, automated light was constructed next to the old light and it began operation when the old tower closed. The old keeper's house is now owned by the municipality and it is used as a restaurant in the summers by reservation only.

== Media gallery ==
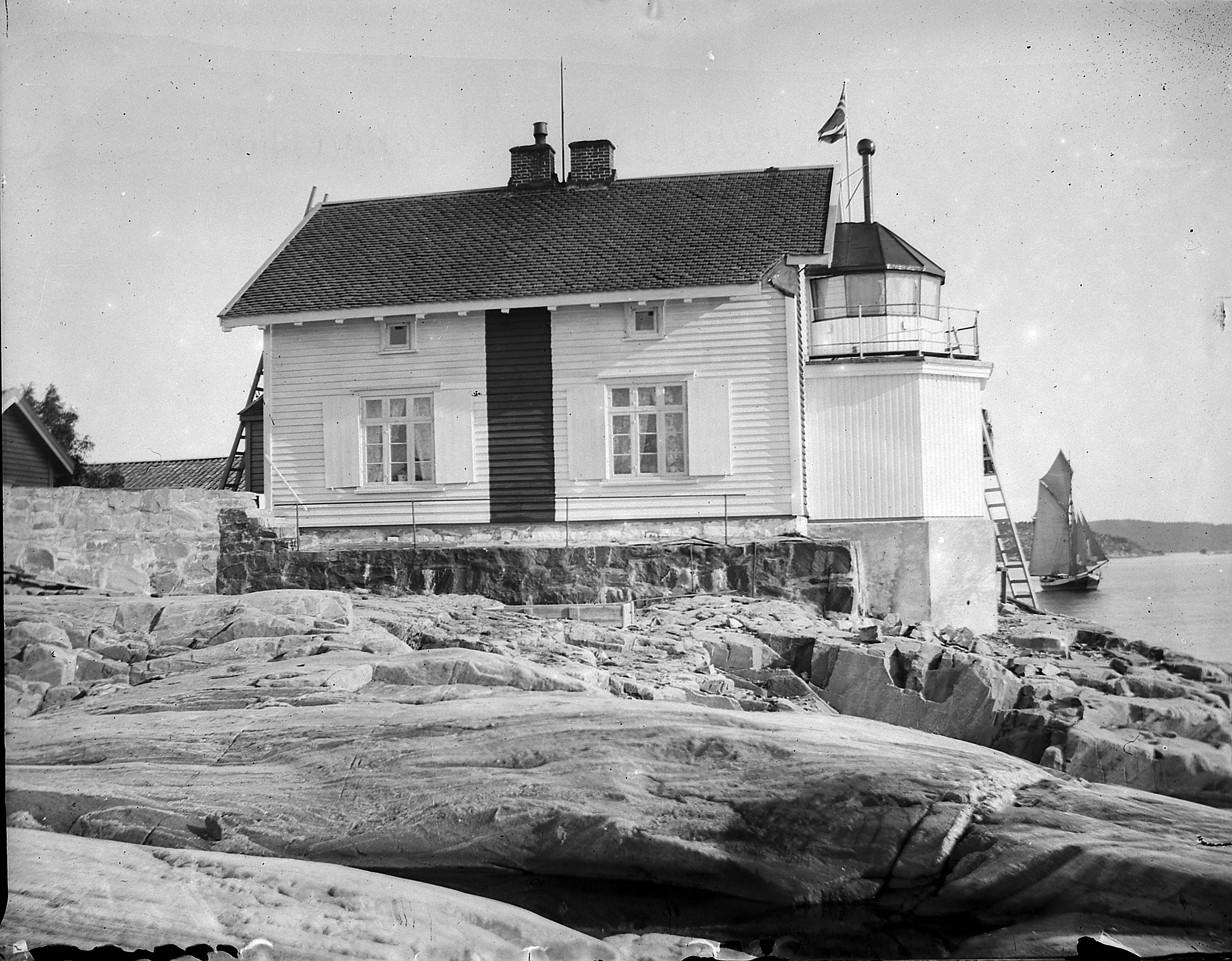
The old lighthouse, c. 1900

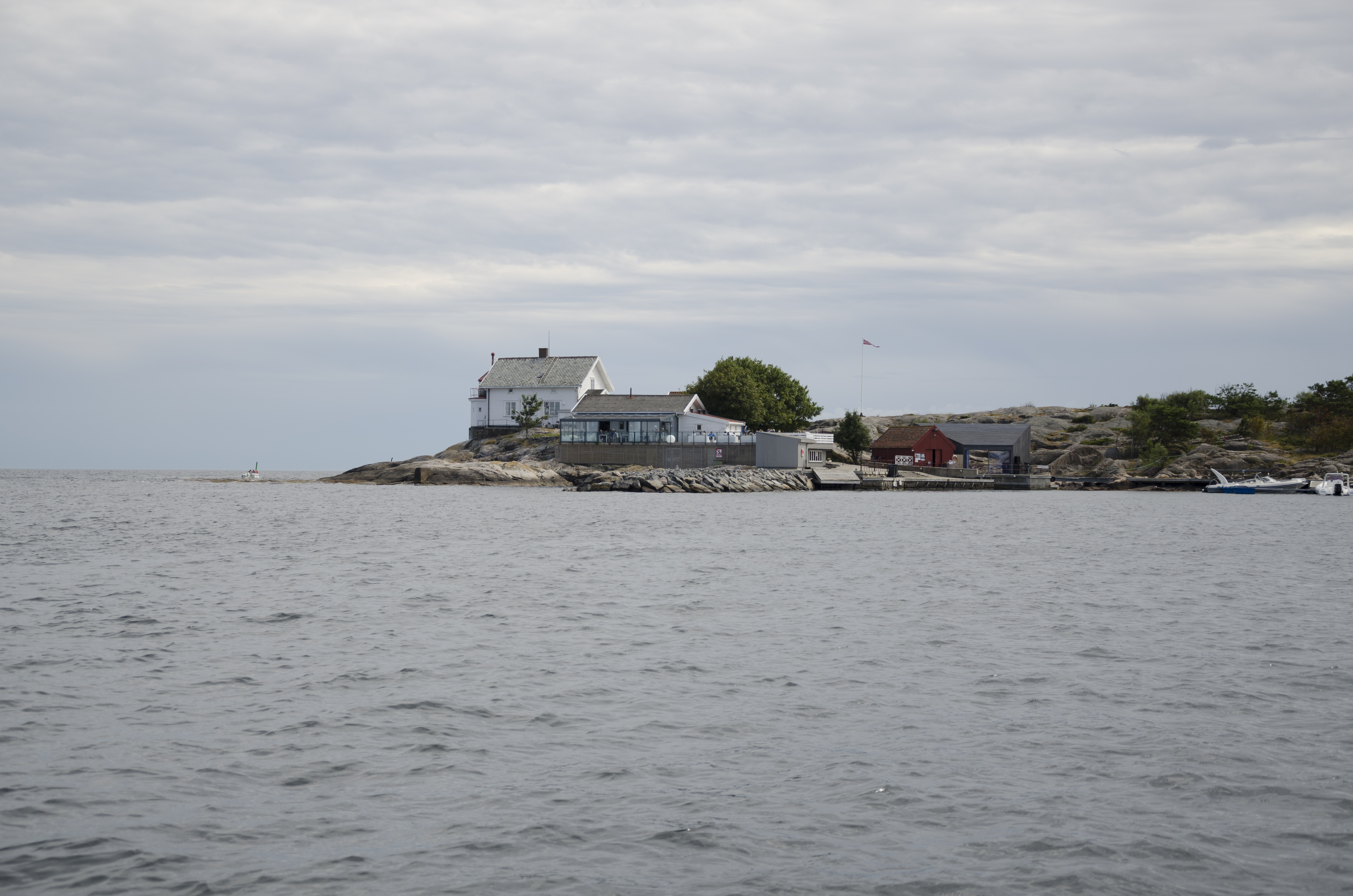
View of the island with the lighthouse

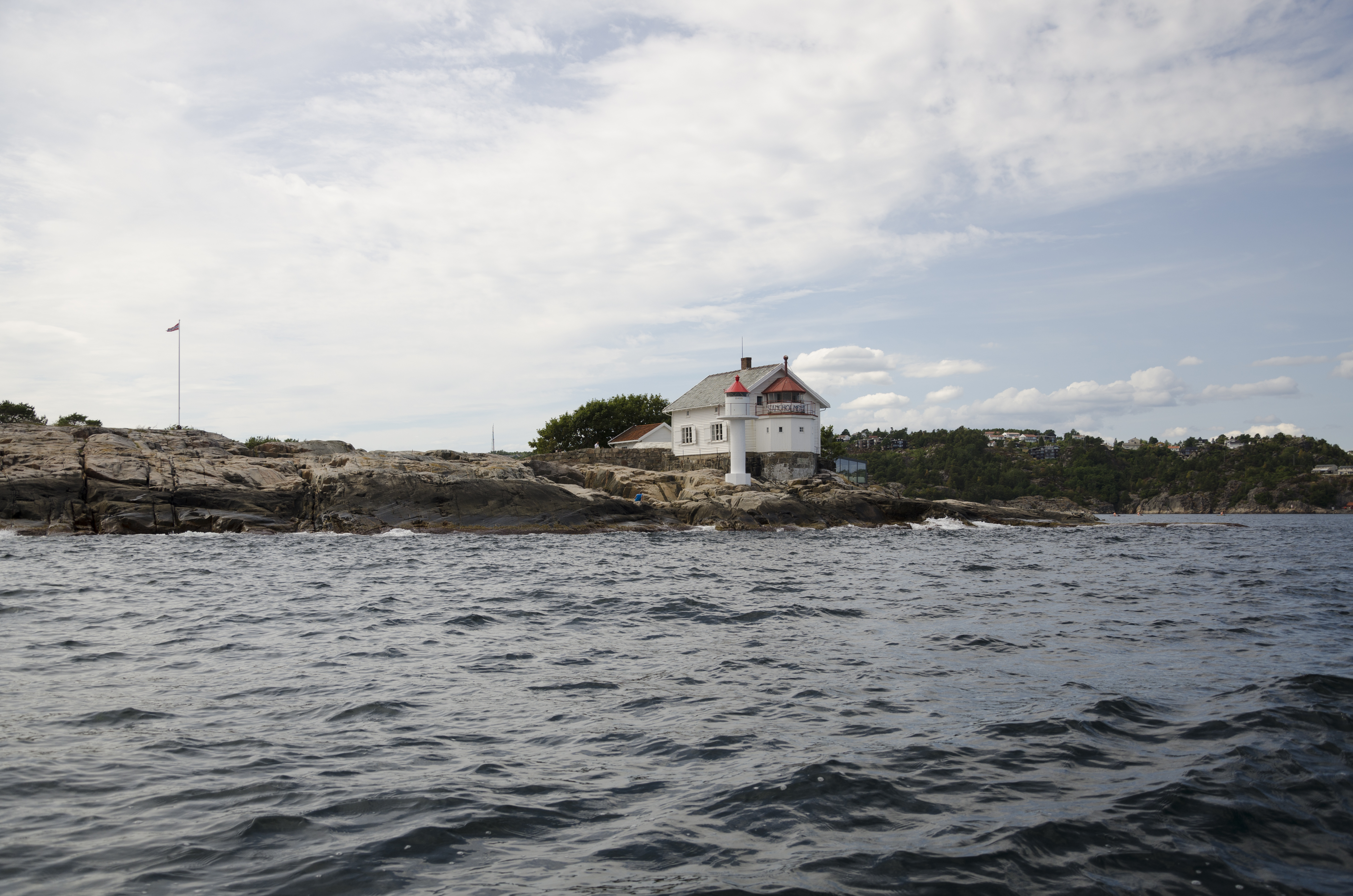
View of the old and new lighthouse

== See also ==
- Lighthouses in Norway
- List of lighthouses in Norway
