= Nipe =

Village in Risør Municipality, Norway

- Village
- Interactive map of Nipe
- Coordinates: 58.6683°N 09.1412°E
- Country: Norway
- Region: Southern Norway
- County: Agder
- District: Østre Agder
- Municipality: Risør Municipality
- Elevation: 17 m (56 ft)
- Time zone: UTC+01:00 (CET)
  - Summer (DST): UTC+02:00 (CEST)
- Post Code: 4957 Risør

Nipe is a village in Risør Municipality in Agder county, Norway. The village is located near the Skagerrak coast, about 4 kilometres (2.5 mi) south of the village of Sandnes and the Sandnesfjorden and about 3 kilometres (1.9 mi) northeast of the village of Gjeving in the neighboring Tvedestrand Municipality.
