= Laget =

Village in Tvedestrand Municipality, Norway

- Village
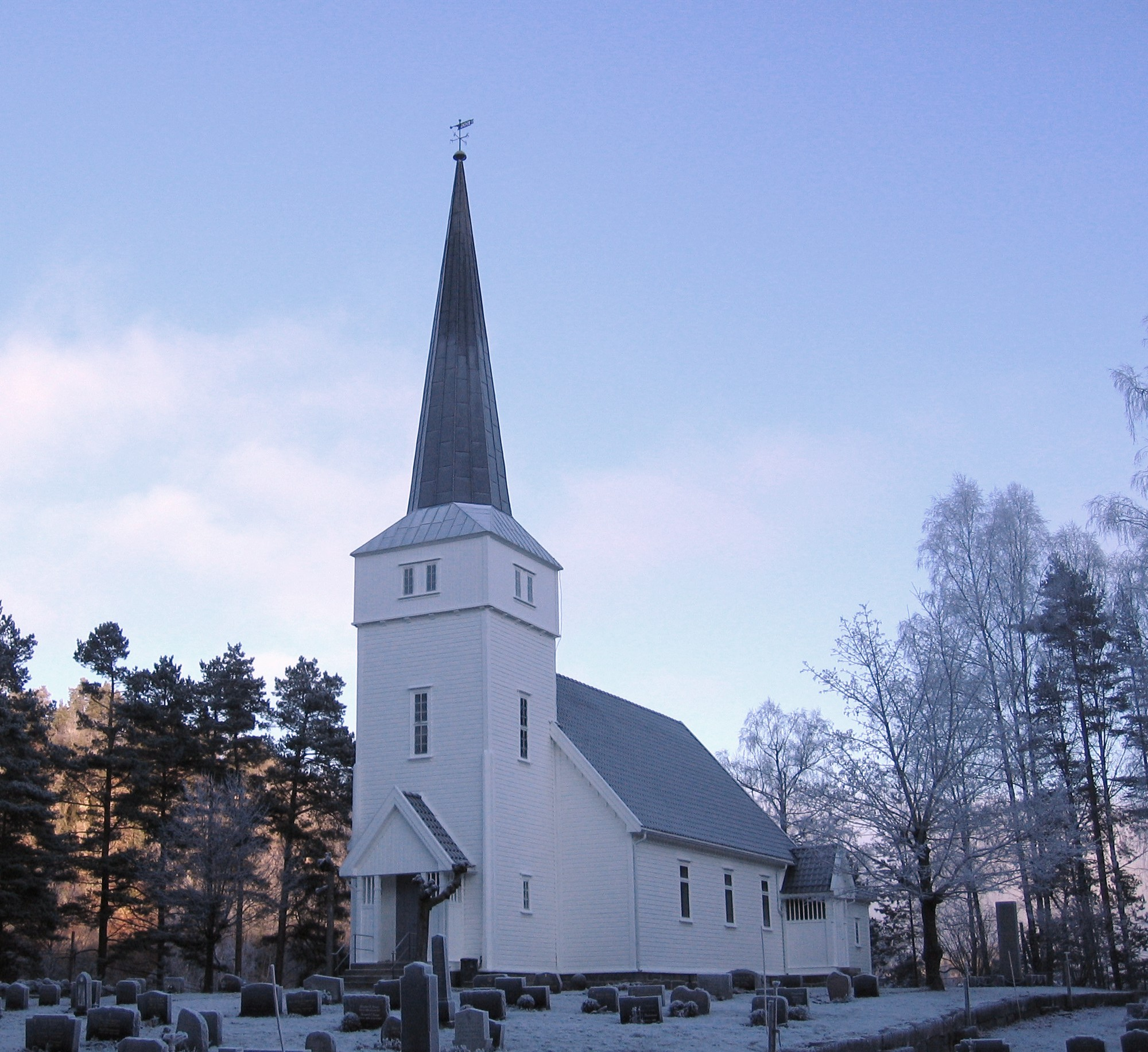
- View of the village church
- Interactive map of Laget
- Coordinates: 58.6813°N 09.0710°E
- Country: Norway
- Region: Southern Norway
- County: Agder
- District: Østre Agder
- Municipality: Tvedestrand Municipality
- Elevation: 7 m (23 ft)
- Time zone: UTC+01:00 (CET)
  - Summer (DST): UTC+02:00 (CEST)
- Post Code: 4950 Risør

Laget is a village in Tvedestrand Municipality in Agder county, Norway. The village is located at the inner end of the Sandnesfjorden, along the Norwegian County Road 411. Laget sits about 12 kilometres (7.5 mi) northeast of the town of Tvedestrand and about 10 kilometres (6.2 mi) southwest of the town of Risør. Laget Church is located in the village.
