= Sandnes, Risør =

Village in Risør Municipality, Norway

Sandnes
- Village
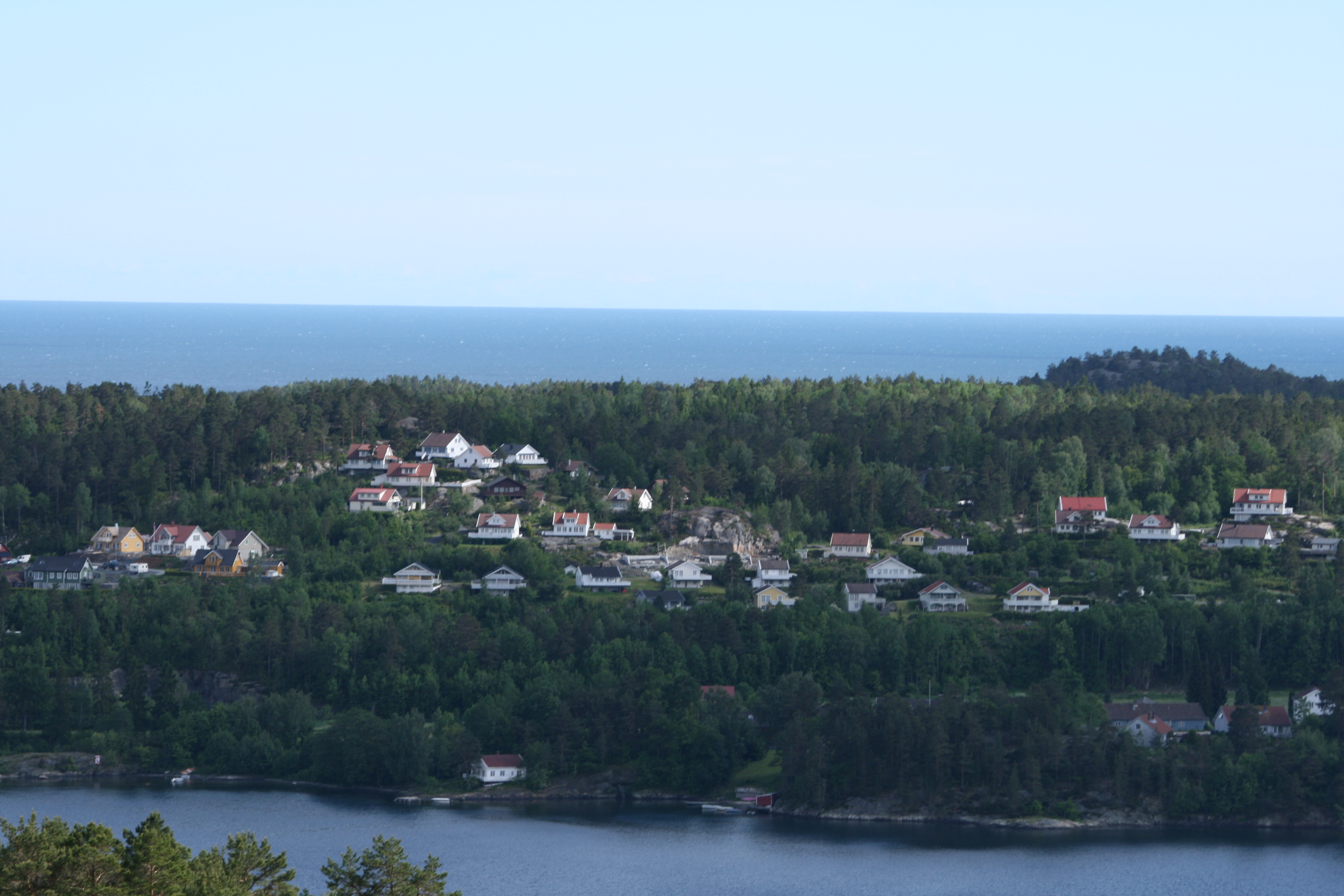
- View of the village
- Interactive map of Sandnes
- Coordinates: 58.6906°N 09.1596°E
- Country: Norway
- Region: Southern Norway
- County: Agder
- District: Østre Agder
- Municipality: Risør Municipality
- Elevation: 35 m (115 ft)
- Time zone: UTC+01:00 (CET)
  - Summer (DST): UTC+02:00 (CEST)
- Post Code: 4950 Risør

Sandnes is a village in Risør Municipality in Agder county, Norway. The village is located along the southern shore of the Sandnesfjorden, about 3 kilometres (1.9 mi) west of the village of Fie, about 4 kilometres (2.5 mi) north of the village of Nipe, and about 6 kilometres (3.7 mi) east of the village of Laget in the neighboring Tvedestrand Municipality.
