= Risør =

Risør may refer to:

== Places ==
- Risør Municipality, a municipality in Agder county, Norway
- Risør (town), a town within Risør Municipality in Agder county, Norway
- Risør Church, a church in Risør Municipality in Agder county, Norway
- Risør videregående skole, an upper secondary school in Risør Municipality in Agder county, Norway
- Risør Underwater Post Office, an underwater post office in Risør Municipality in Agder county, Norway

== Other ==
- Risør kammermusikkfest, an annual music festival held in Risør Municipality in Agder county, Norway
- Risør FK, an association football club based in Risør Municipality in Agder county, Norway

== See also ==
- Risor, a type of fish
