= Risør Underwater Post Office =

Norway tourist attraction

Coordinates: 58°43′22″N 9°14′20″E

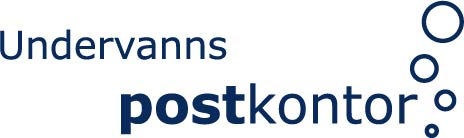
Logo of the Risør Underwater Post Office

Risør Underwater Post Office (Norwegian: Risør Undervannspostkontor) is a post office constructed by use of a diving bell, built as a tourist attraction and located on the ocean floor in Risør, a small town on the southern Norwegian coast. Authorized by the Norwegian Postal system as a bona fide post office, eligible for collection and processing of letters, it is the only dry underwater post office in the world; other underwater post offices operate in wet environments. It is in operation during the summer months, as this period coincides with the tourist season as well as the warmer climate.

== History ==
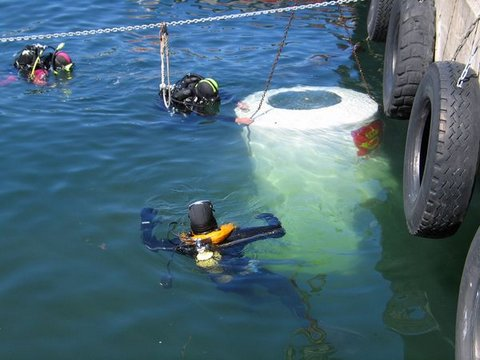
The post office during launch.

Conceived by the local SCUBA diving club, the underwater post office was established June 4, 2004. It was placed at a depth of 4 metres next to a pier designed to accommodate large ships, a pier which also houses the local Aquarium.

Initially a success, the number of letters dwindled after the first few years. As the work (and cost) involved with the running of the post office began to take its toll, the closure of the office was decided and the 2011 season was to be its last in service. However, the town's tourism board and local businesses offered their support and persuaded the divers to continue the tradition.

From its opening in 2004 to 2011, the underwater postmaster was Håkon Sandvik; from 2012 onwards Tore Bjørn Hovde has the responsibility. Both are members of the local SCUBA diving club. Other members also contribute periodically.

== Structure ==
The post office is a form of diving bell constructed in fiberglass, and is filled with air so that the mail stays dry. The structure is moored to the bottom by a 5-ton weight.

== Operation ==
Visitors can post their mail in a post box by the pier and this is then emptied two to three times per week. The postmaster takes the mail down to the post office by means of a watertight bag. Inside, the mail is stamped before it is returned to the surface. It is then entered into normal post circulation.

== Mail sent ==
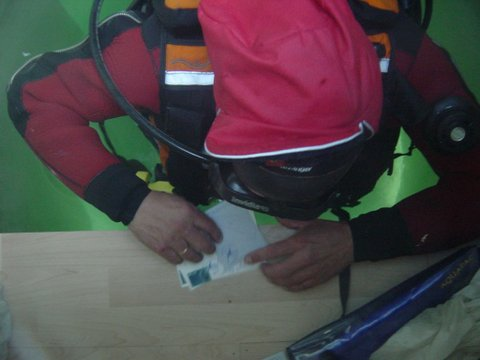
Postmaster Haakon Sandvik stamping cards.

Records are kept by the postmaster, detailing the numbers of cards and letters that are sent through the underwater post office. In addition to 266 "bottles" (available for purchase at the Aquarium), the numbers are the following:

- 2004: 5,010
- 2005: 1,388
- 2006: 802
- 2007: 954
- 2008: 647
- 2009: 362
- 2010: 530
- 2011: 320
- 2012: 370

== Pictures ==
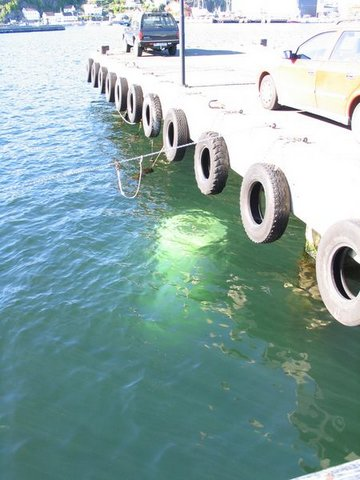
The post office in place by the pier.

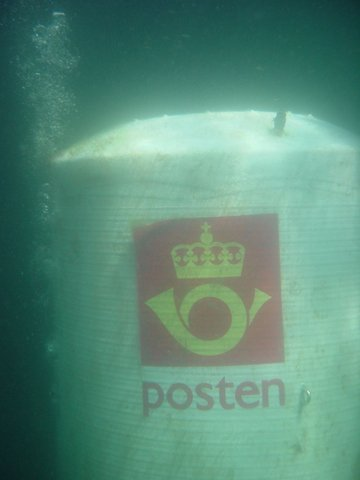
The post office under water.

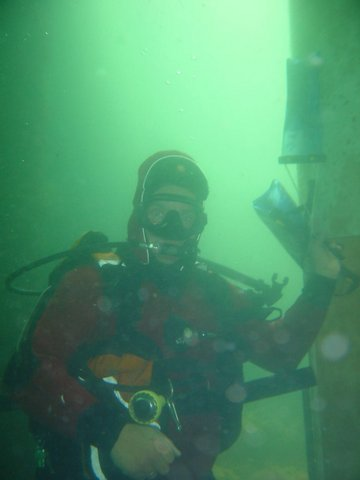
Postmaster Haakon Sandvik under water.

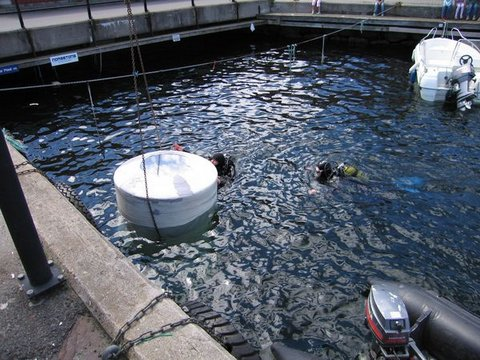
Divers standing by for launch.
