= Krabbesund =

Village in Risør Municipality, Norway

- Village
- Interactive map of Krabbesund
- Coordinates: 58.6770°N 09.2076°E
- Country: Norway
- Region: Southern Norway
- County: Agder
- District: Østre Agder
- Municipality: Risør Municipality
- Elevation: 3 m (9.8 ft)
- Time zone: UTC+01:00 (CET)
  - Summer (DST): UTC+02:00 (CEST)
- Post Code: 4950 Risør

Krabbesund is a coastal village in Risør Municipality in Agder county, Norway. The village is located, along the Skagerrak coast, just south of the village of Fie.
