= Laget Church =

Church in Agder, Norway

- Laget kirke
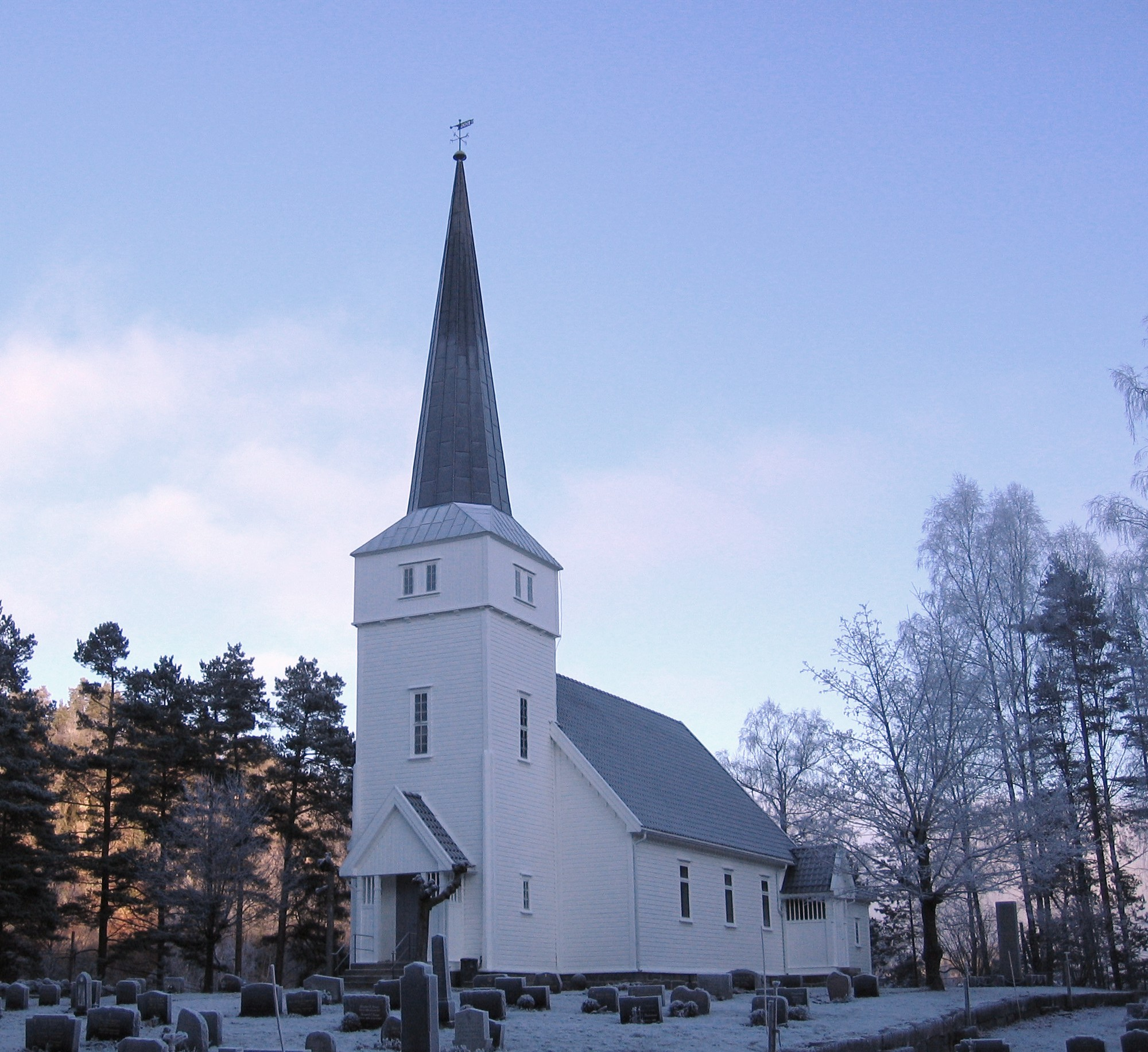
- View of the church
- Laget Church
- 58.680032°N 09.062944°E
- Location: Tvedestrand Municipality, Agder
- Country: Norway
- Denomination: Church of Norway
- Churchmanship: Evangelical Lutheran

History
- Former name: Laget kapell
- Status: Parish church
- Founded: 1908
- Consecrated: 11 Sept 1908

Architecture
- Functional status: Active
- Architect: Henrik Nissen
- Architectural type: Long church
- Completed: 1908 (118 years ago)

Specifications
- Capacity: 250
- Materials: Wood

Administration
- Diocese: Agder og Telemark
- Deanery: Aust-Nedenes prosti
- Parish: Holt
- Norwegian Cultural Heritage Site
- Type: Church
- Status: Listed
- ID: 84883

Laget Church (Norwegian: Laget kirke) is a parish church of the Church of Norway in Tvedestrand Municipality in Agder county, Norway. It is located in the village of Laget. It is one of the churches for the Holt parish which is part of the Aust-Nedenes prosti (deanery) in the Diocese of Agder og Telemark. The white, wooden church was built in a long church design in 1908 using plans drawn up by the architect Henrik Nissen. The church seats about 250 people.

The church was first built in 1908 as a chapel of ease for the northern part of the Holt Church parish. The church was consecrated on 11 September 1908. In 1967, the roof and tower were repaired.

== See also ==
- List of churches in Agder og Telemark
