= Sandnesfjorden =

Fjord in Agder, Norway

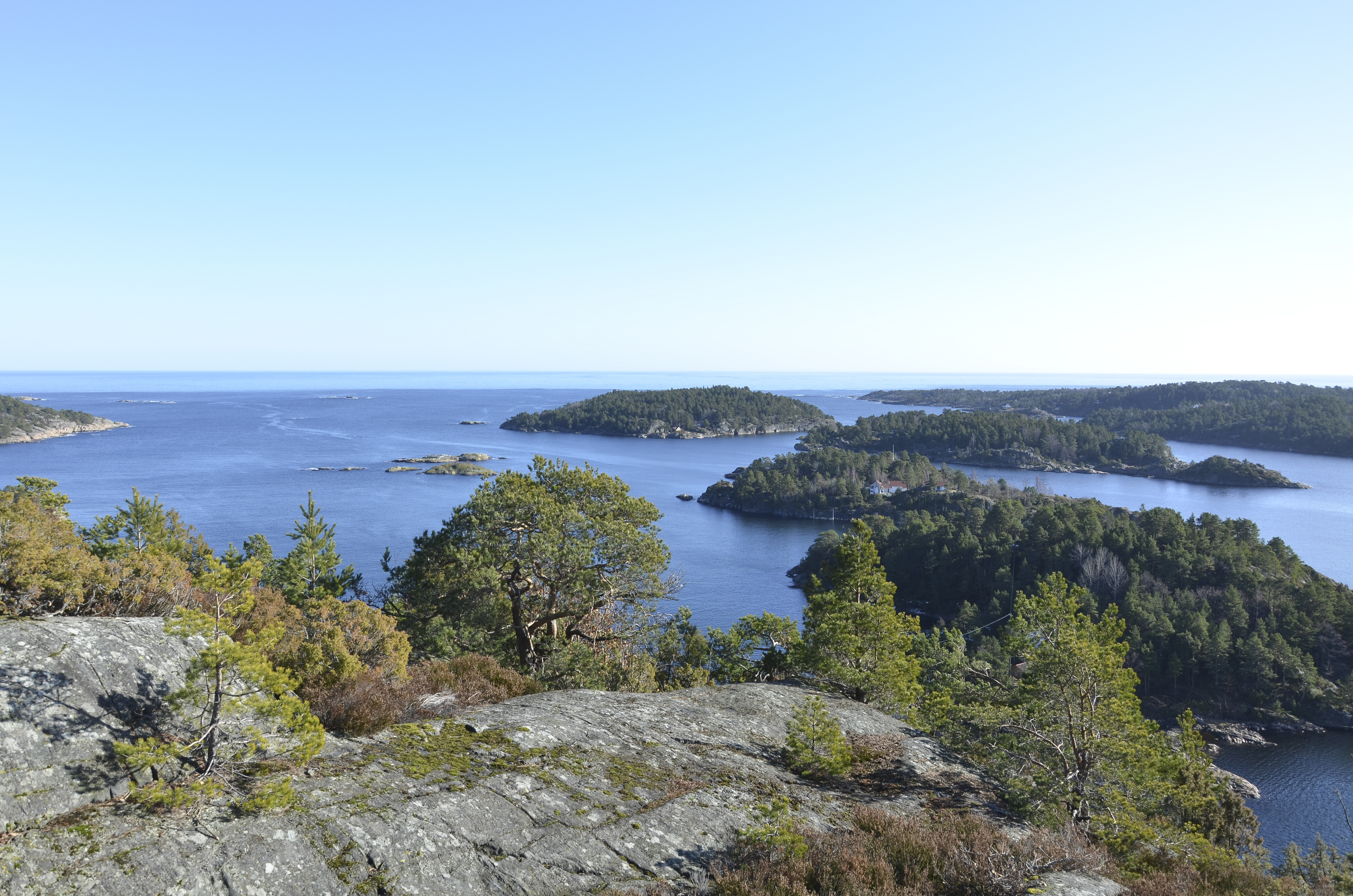
- View of the mouth of the fjord
- Interactive map of the fjord
- Location: Agder county, Norway
- Coordinates: 58.6932°N 09.1309°E
- Type: Fjord
- Primary inflows: River Lagelva
- Primary outflows: Skaggerak
- Catchment area: Vegår
- Basin countries: Norway
- Max. length: 10 kilometres (6.2 mi)
- Max. width: 1 kilometre (0.62 mi)
- Settlements: Sandnes

Sandnesfjorden is a fjord in Agder county, Norway. The 10-kilometre (6.2 mi) long fjord is primarily in Risør Municipality, but the innermost part of the fjord is actually in Tvedestrand Municipality. The fjord originates at the large inland lake Vegår and flows south and east through the river Storelva before emptying into the coastal lake Nævestadfjorden. This coastal lake flows through a 1-kilometre (0.62 mi) long river, Lagelva, before it flows into the Sandnesfjorden which flows out to the Skagerrak sea.

The Norwegian County Road 411 crosses the fjord where the river Lagelva meets the fjord. The village of Sandnes is located on the southern shore of the fjord. There are many islands at the mouth of the fjord, just south of the town of Risør.

== See also ==
- List of Norwegian fjords
