= Risør (town) =

Town in Agder, Norway

Risør Øster-Risør (historic)
- Town/City
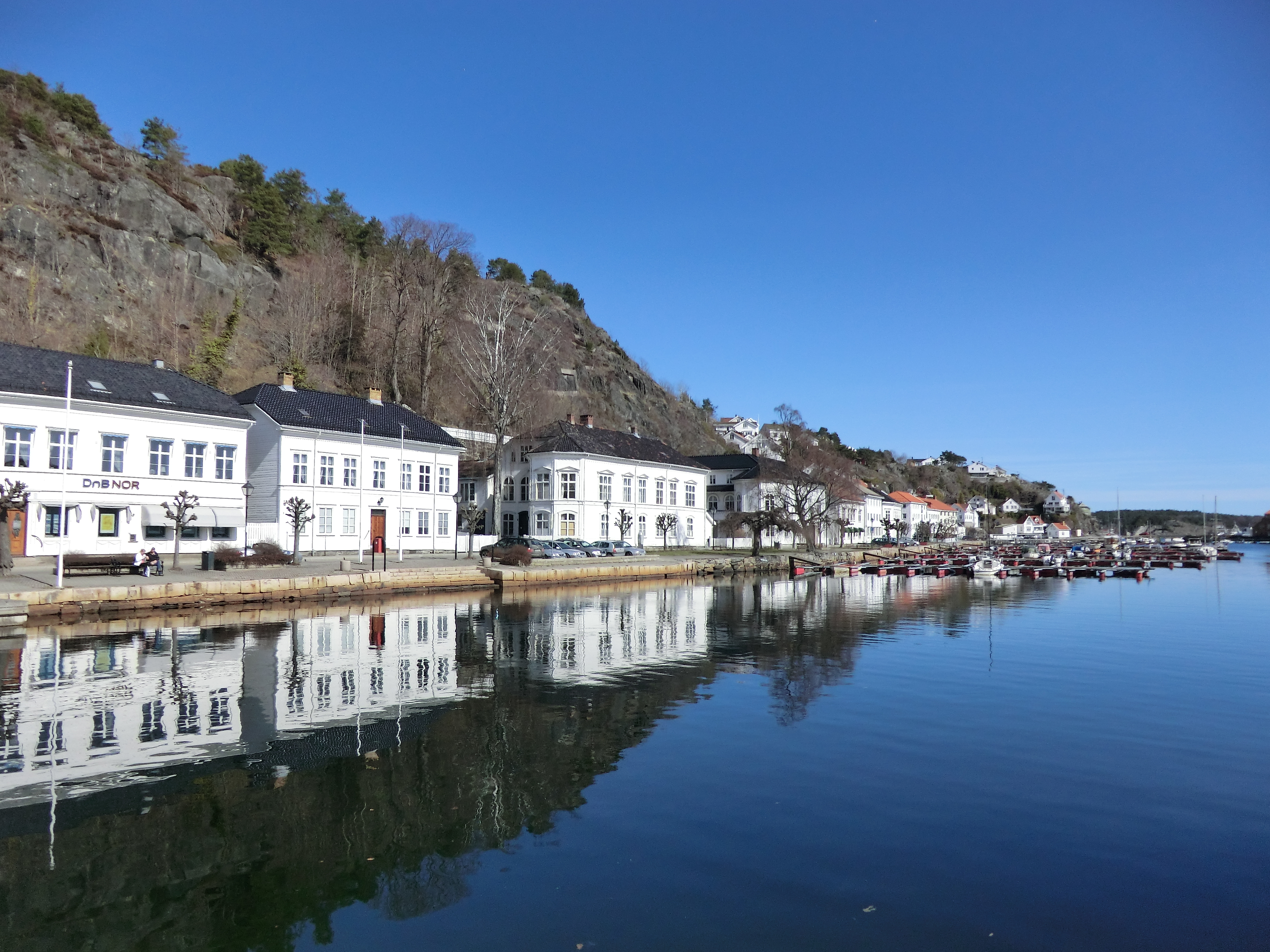
- View of the cliffs of Risør
- Interactive map of Risør
- Coordinates: 58.72058°N 9.23421°E
- Region: Southern Norway
- County: Agder
- District: Østre Agder
- Municipality: Risør Municipality
- Established as
- Ladested: 1630
- Kjøpstad: 1723

Area
  - Total: 3.06 km^{2} (1.18 sq mi)
- Elevation: 3 m (9.8 ft)

Population (2026)
  - Total: 4,586
  - Density: 1,499/km^{2} (3,880/sq mi)
- Time zone: UTC+01:00 (CET)
  - Summer (DST): UTC+02:00 (CEST)
- Post Code: 4950 Risør

Risør (pronounced [rɪːˌsøːr]) is a seaside resort, a town, and the administrative centre of Risør Municipality in Agder county, Norway. The town is located along the Skagerrak coast on a peninsula between the entrances to the Søndeledfjorden (to the north) and the Sandnesfjorden (to the south). The town is one of the oldest towns in Southern Norway. It was declared a ladested in 1630 and upgraded to a kjøpstad in 1723.

The town of Risør sits about 20 kilometres (12 mi) southwest of the nearby coastal town of Kragerø (in Telemark county) and about the same distance northeast of the nearby coastal town of Tvedestrand. The nearest large town to Risør is the town of Arendal, about 40 kilometres (25 mi) to the southwest. The 3.06-square-kilometre (760-acre) town has a population (2025) of 4,586 and a population density of 1,499 inhabitants per square kilometre (3,880/sq mi).

Risør is known as "the white town by the Skagerrak" (Norwegian: Den hvite by ved Skagerrak) because of its numerous well-preserved, old, white, wooden houses which the town actively protects. It is famous for its tourist attractions such as the wooden boat festival which is staged during the first week of August every year. It also has a growing reputation as the regional capital of arts and crafts, which culminates in the "Villvin-festival" during the summer holiday season. There are two historic churches in Risør: Risør Church near the town centre and Frydendal Church in the western part of the town. The Stangholmen Lighthouse lies a short distance off the shore, just southeast of the harbor, marking the channel leading into the town.

== History ==
The village of Risør was a small fishing village in the prestegjeld of Søndeled when Dutch vessels began to call there to purchase timber around the year 1570. By 1607, two inns had been opened to serve Dutch sailors. In 1630, Risør became a privileged port (ladested). The town's timber-framed church, Risør Church, was built in the Baroque style in 1647.

In 1723, Risør was granted kjøpstad status which granted it a number of commercial privileges. By the end of the 18th century, 96 sailing vessels were owned by Risør merchants. It was the sixth largest shipping town and one of four shipbuilding centers in Norway.

In Letters on Sweden, Norway, and Denmark, Mary Wollstonecraft wrote extensively while visiting Risør in 1783, including the following remarks:

- On entering Risør: "We were a considerable time entering amongst the islands, before we saw about two hundred houses crowded together under a very high rock—still higher appearing above."
- While at Risør: "...seaports are not favorable to improvement. The captains acquire a little superficial knowledge by traveling, which their indefatigable attention to the making of money prevents their digesting; and the fortune that they thus laboriously acquire is spent, as it usually is in towns of this description, in show and good living."
- While departing Risør: "The view of the town was now extremely fine. A huge rocky mountain stood up behind it, and a vast cliff stretched on each side, forming a semicircle. In a recess of the rocks was a clump of pines, amongst which a steeple rose picturesquely beautiful."

Risør played a role in the Napoleonic Wars from 1807 to 1814, when Denmark–Norway took France's side, and therefore became the enemy of Norway's most important trading-partner: Great Britain. (It is from this period that Henrik Ibsen took his subject, when he created his famous poem Terje Vigen.) It was south of Risør, at Lyngør (now in the neighboring Tvedestrand Municipality) that several British warships, headed by HMS Dictator of the English Royal Navy pursued and sank the last major vessel and the pride of Norway: the frigate HDMS Najaden.

On 1 January 1838, the new formannskapsdistrikt law came into effect, granting each parish and town in Norway the rights to have a self-governing council. Thus, Risør was a small town with its own town council to run it.

Risør was almost wiped off the map in 1861. A great fire swept across the small town leaving just 85 houses and the 1647 Risør Church. The entire road network was re-worked after the fire to remove the small streets and alleys and have wider roads that are there today. The town was redesigned and rebuilt and today it presents a positive impression of a well kept town with white, wooden houses. White was chosen because it was an expensive paint and they residents wanted to give an expression of prosperity. Still today, most houses have white paint, although some have other colors on the sides and back of their houses.

By the second half of the 19th century, over 100 sailing vessels were based at their home port in Risør and more than 1,000 sailors called Risør home. The transition to steamships and the economic damage of World War I, however, destroyed Risør's shipping industry.

On 1 January 1901, an area of the neighboring Søndeled Municipality (population: 658) was transferred into the town, greatly expanding Risør. During the 1960s, there were many municipal mergers across Norway due to the work of the Schei Committee. On 1 January 1964, the town of Risør (population: 3,002) was merged with Søndeled Municipality (population: 3,134) to form a much larger Risør Municipality, with the urban town of Risør being the administrative centre of the large municipality.

=== Name ===
The name for the town of Risør likely comes from the Old Norse name Ríseyjar. The first element is rís which means "thicket" and the last element is eyjar which is the plural form of "island". The relatively more modern Danish version of eyjar is øer, hence the current spelling of Risør. The name was originally referring to the nearby island of Risøya which is located just outside the town. The old name of the town (until 1909) was Østerrisør (meaning "eastern Risør"). The first element was added in the 16th century to distinguish the town from Vesterrisør, the old name of Mandal.

== Government ==
In Norway, municipalities are the unit of local government. This means that cities and towns are simply designations for urban areas, but under current Norwegian law, they have no actual government authority. The town of Risør lies within Risør Municipality and is therefore governed by the municipal council of Risør Municipality.

== Media gallery ==
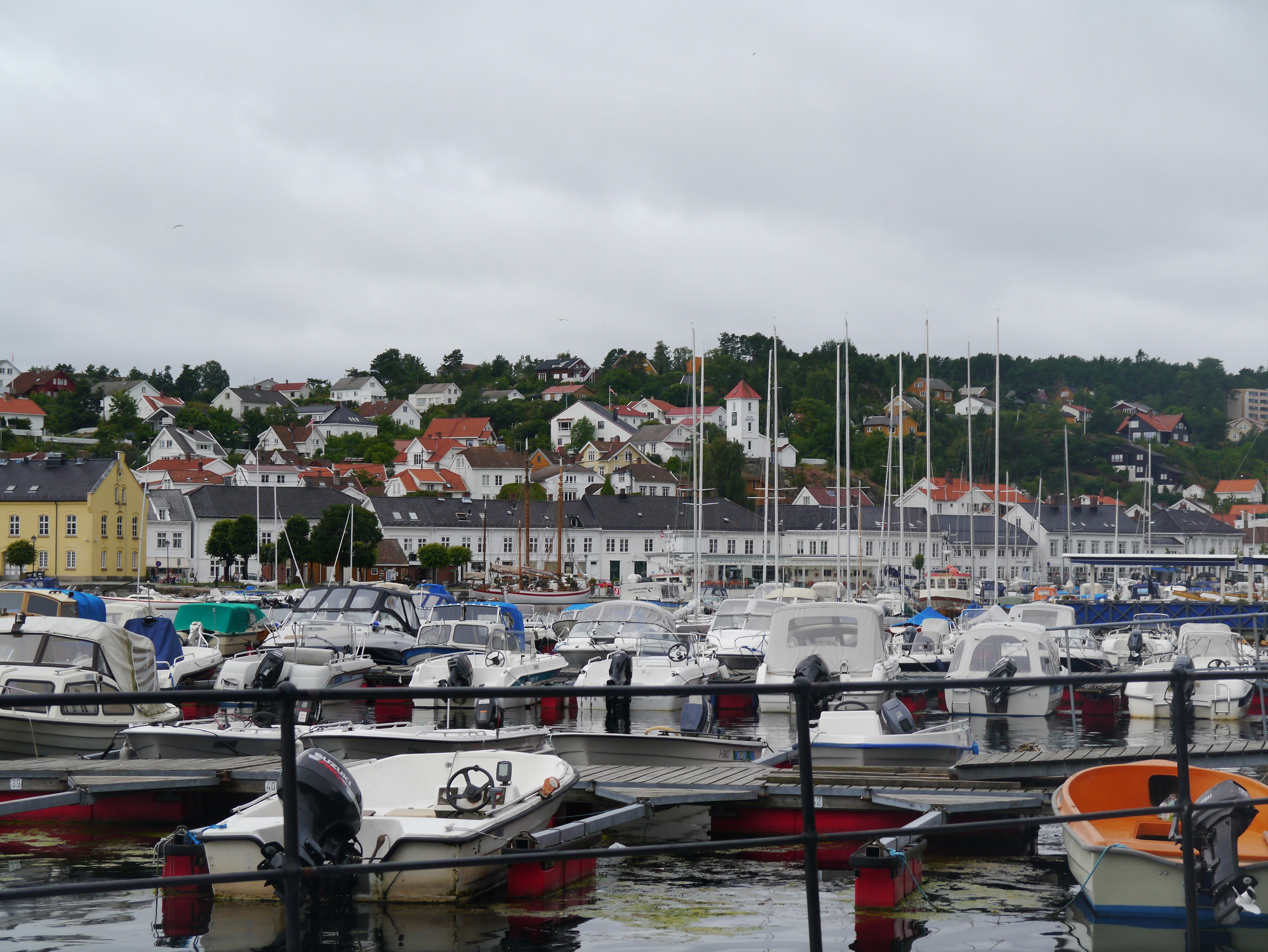
Harbour

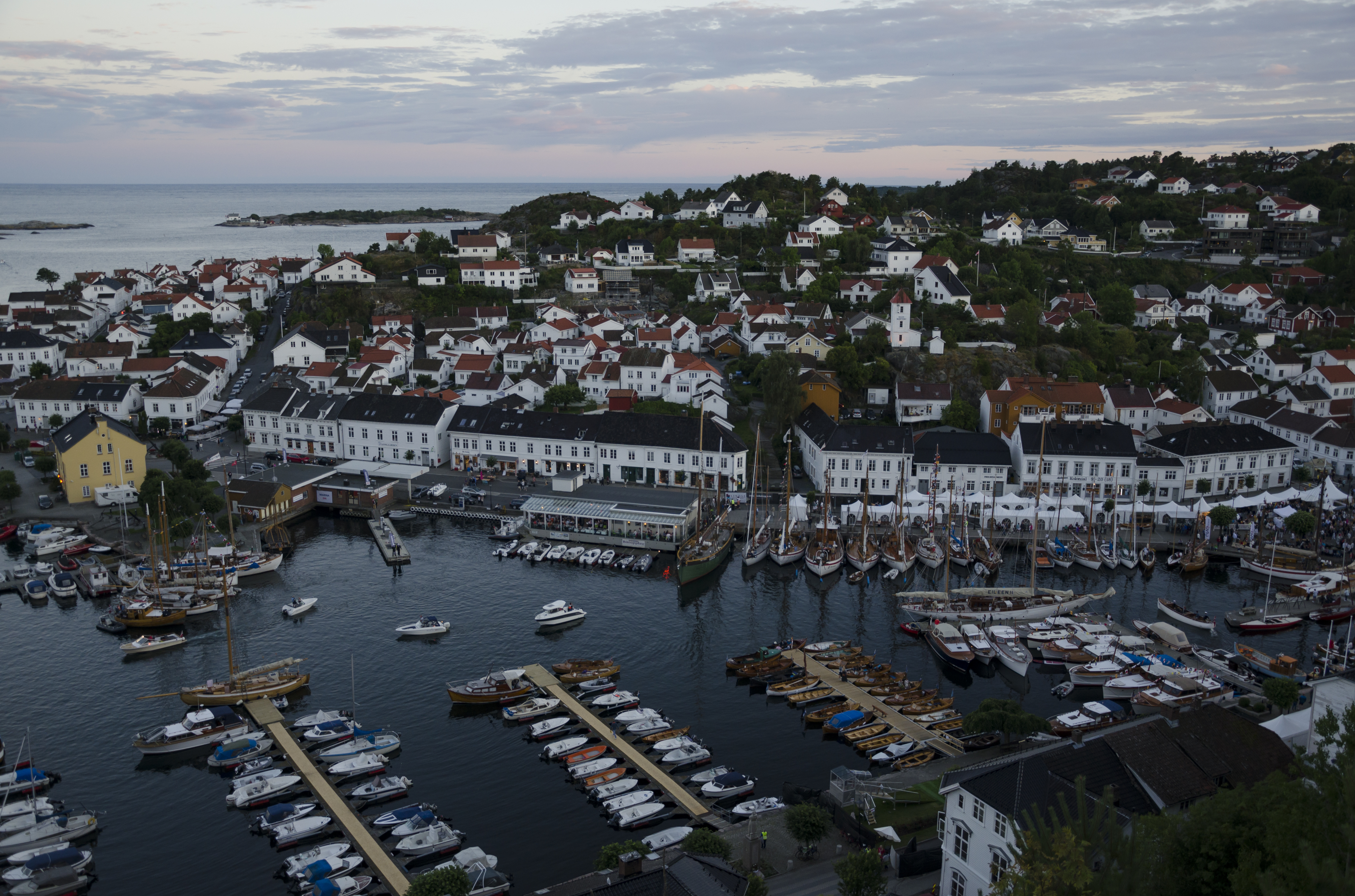
Looking inland past the harbour

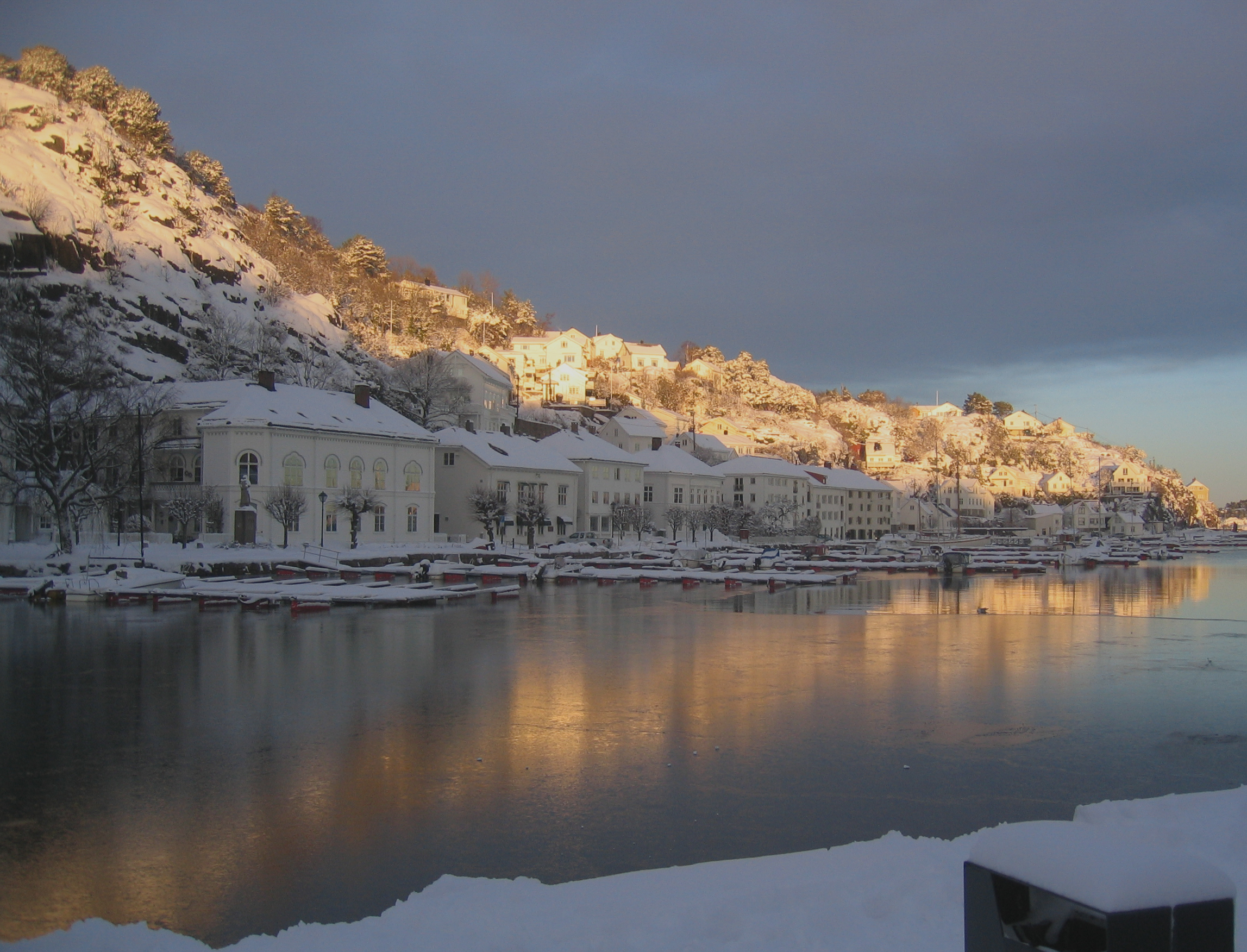
Winter view

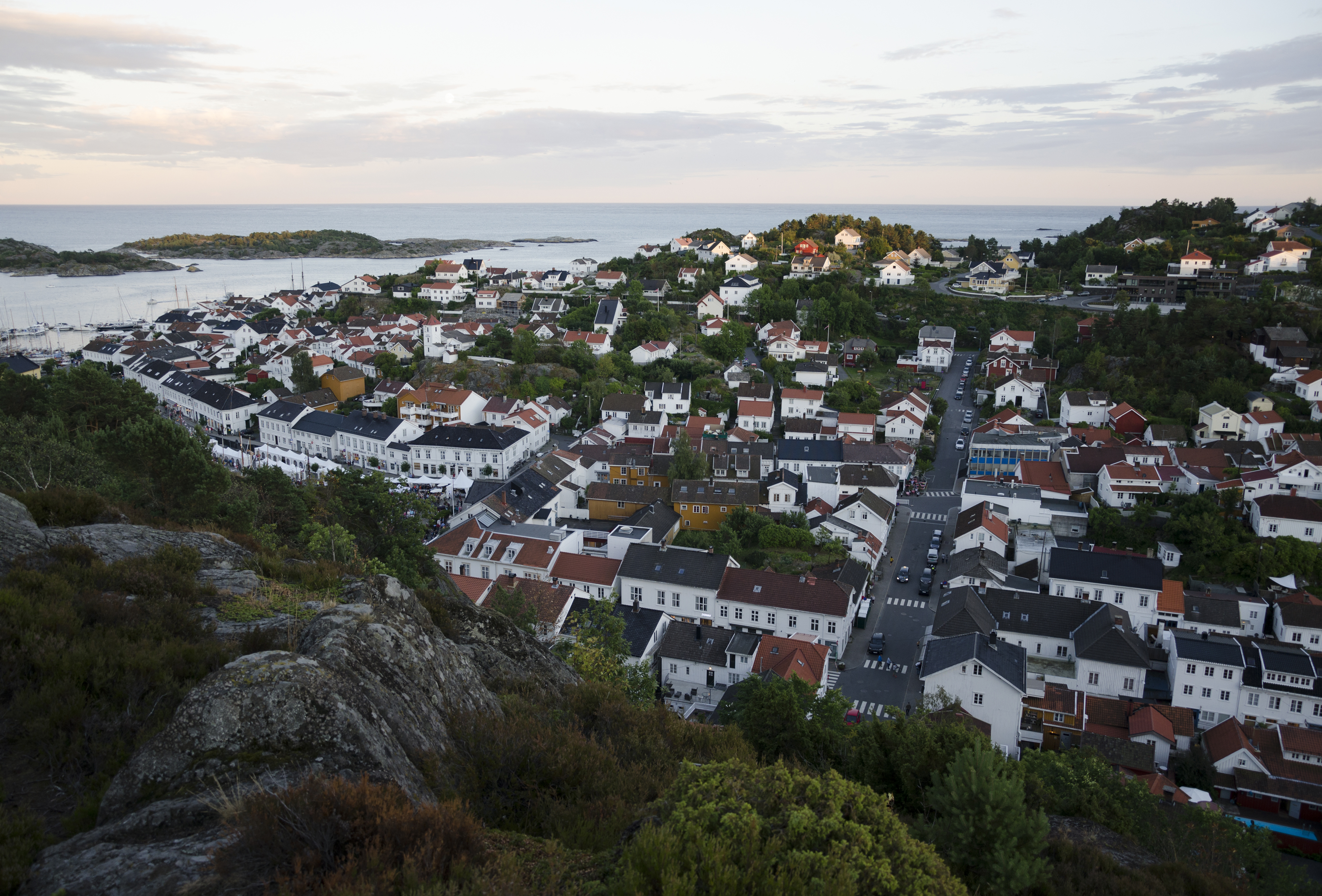
Looking towards the sea

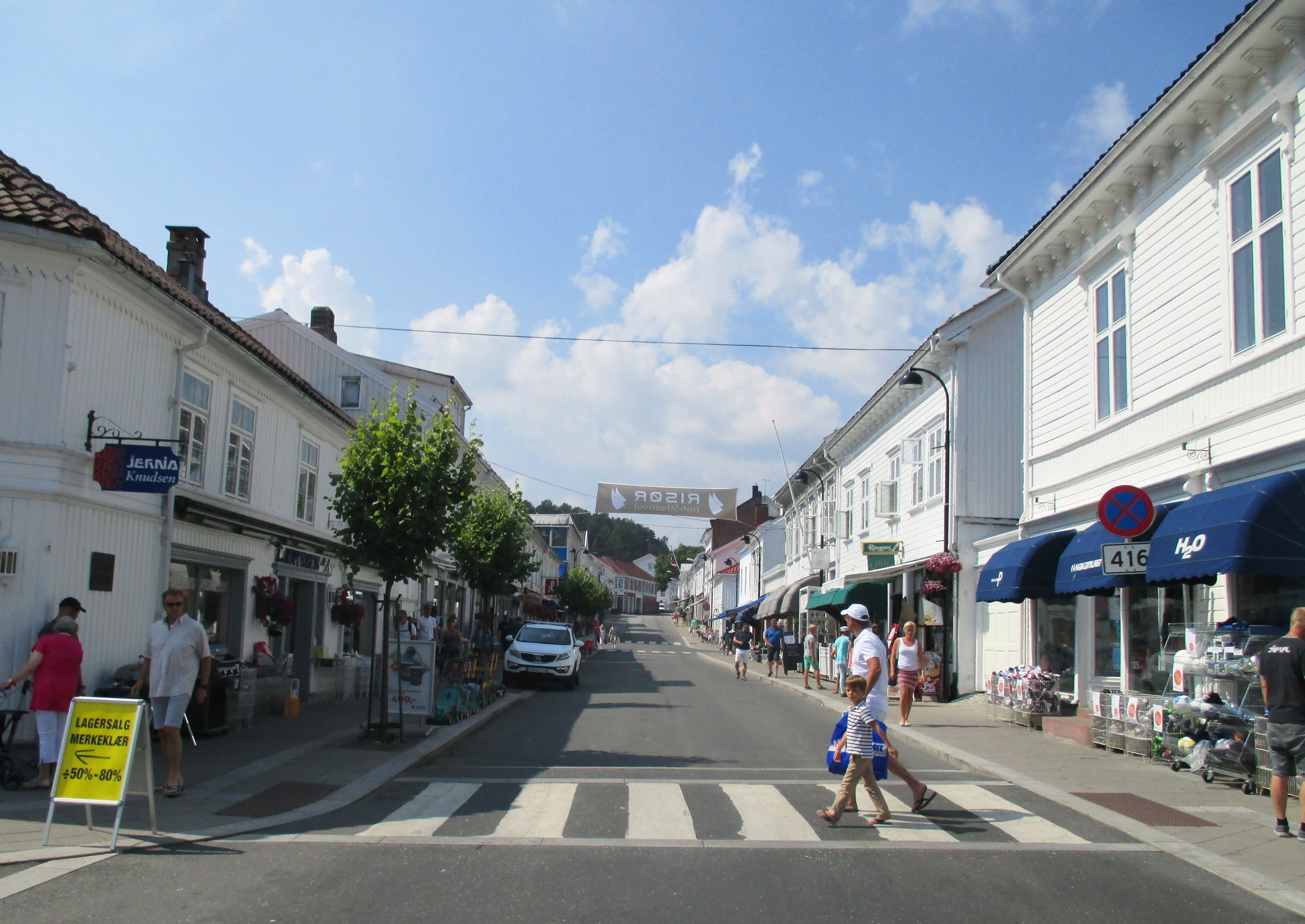
Road through Risør

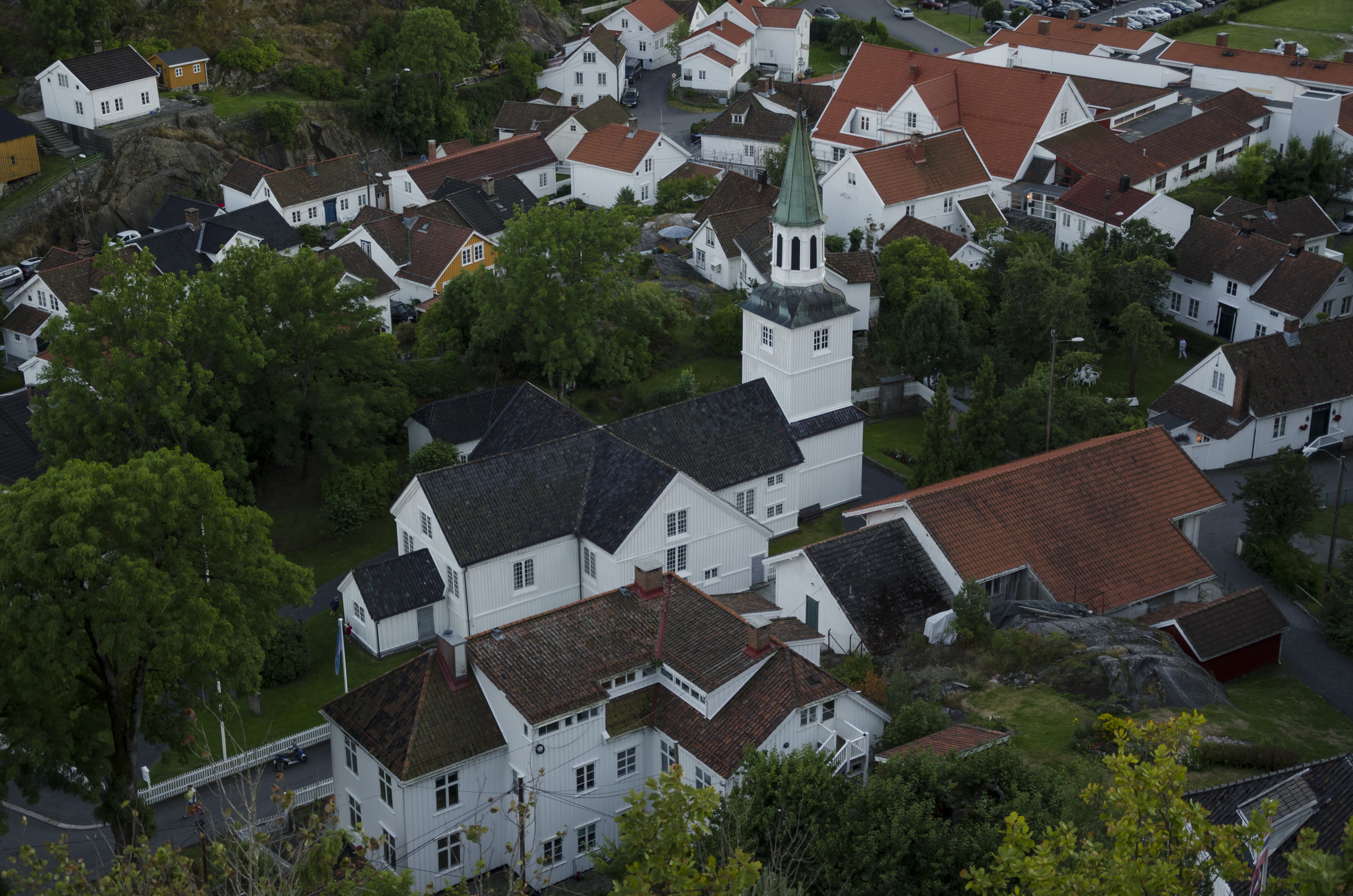
View of Risør Church from 1647

== Notable people ==
- Erik Mykland, a professional footballer
- Victor D. Norman, the former minister of labor and administration and a professor of economy at NHH
- Serene Torjussen Evensen (also known as Serena Gardner), the first female convert in Norway to the Church of Jesus Christ of Latter-Day Saints
- Ove Ansteinsson (1884–1942), a journalist and author
- Isak Lauritssøn Falck (1601–1669), a land owner and timber merchant
- Thorbjørn Jagland, a politician and a former prime minister of Norway

== See also ==
- List of towns and cities in Norway
