= Røysland =

Village in Risør Municipality, Norway

- Village
- Interactive map of Røysland
- Coordinates: 58.7752°N 09.2367°E
- Country: Norway
- Region: Southern Norway
- County: Agder
- District: Østre Agder
- Municipality: Risør Municipality
- Elevation: 53 m (174 ft)
- Time zone: UTC+01:00 (CET)
  - Summer (DST): UTC+02:00 (CEST)
- Post Code: 4990 Søndeled

Røysland is a village in Risør Municipality in Agder county, Norway. The village is located along the lake Skarvann, about 2 kilometres (1.2 mi) west of the village of Hødnebø and about 3 kilometres (1.9 mi) north of the northern shore of the Søndeledfjorden.
