= Andreas Riis =

Danish minister and missionary

The Reverend Andreas Riis
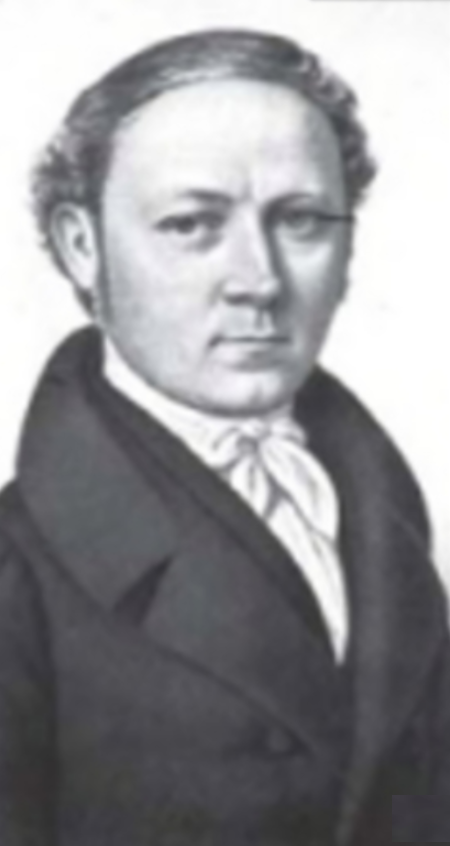
- Andreas Riis
- Born: 12 January 1804; Løgumkloster, Duchy of Schleswig
- Died: 13 January 1854 (aged 50); Naksby near Grimstad, Sweden and Norway
- Education: Basel Mission Seminary, Basel, Switzerland
- Occupations: Clergyman; Missionary
- Spouses: Anna Margaretha Wolter (m. 1836; died 1845); Hilleborg Pharo (m. 1849)
- Children: 5
- Parents: Andreas Petersen Riis (father); Anna Maria F. Philipsen (mother)

Ecclesiastical career
- Church: Basel Evangelical Missionary Society

Orders
- Ordination: Lörrach, 1832
- Consecration: Basel Minster, 1832

Andreas Riis (12 January 1804 – 13 January 1854) was a Danish minister and pioneer missionary who is widely regarded by historians as the founder of the Gold Coast branch of the Basel Evangelical Missionary Society. A resident of the Gold Coast from 1832 to 1845, Riis played a critical role in the recruitment of 24 West Indian missionaries from Jamaica and Antigua in 1843 to aid the work of the mission in formal education, agriculture and the propagation of the Gospel in colonial Ghana. As the first Basel missionary in Akropong in 1835, he laid the groundwork for the first mission house, eventually resulting in the founding of the first Christian church there which later became the Christ Presbyterian Church, Akropong.

== Early life and education ==
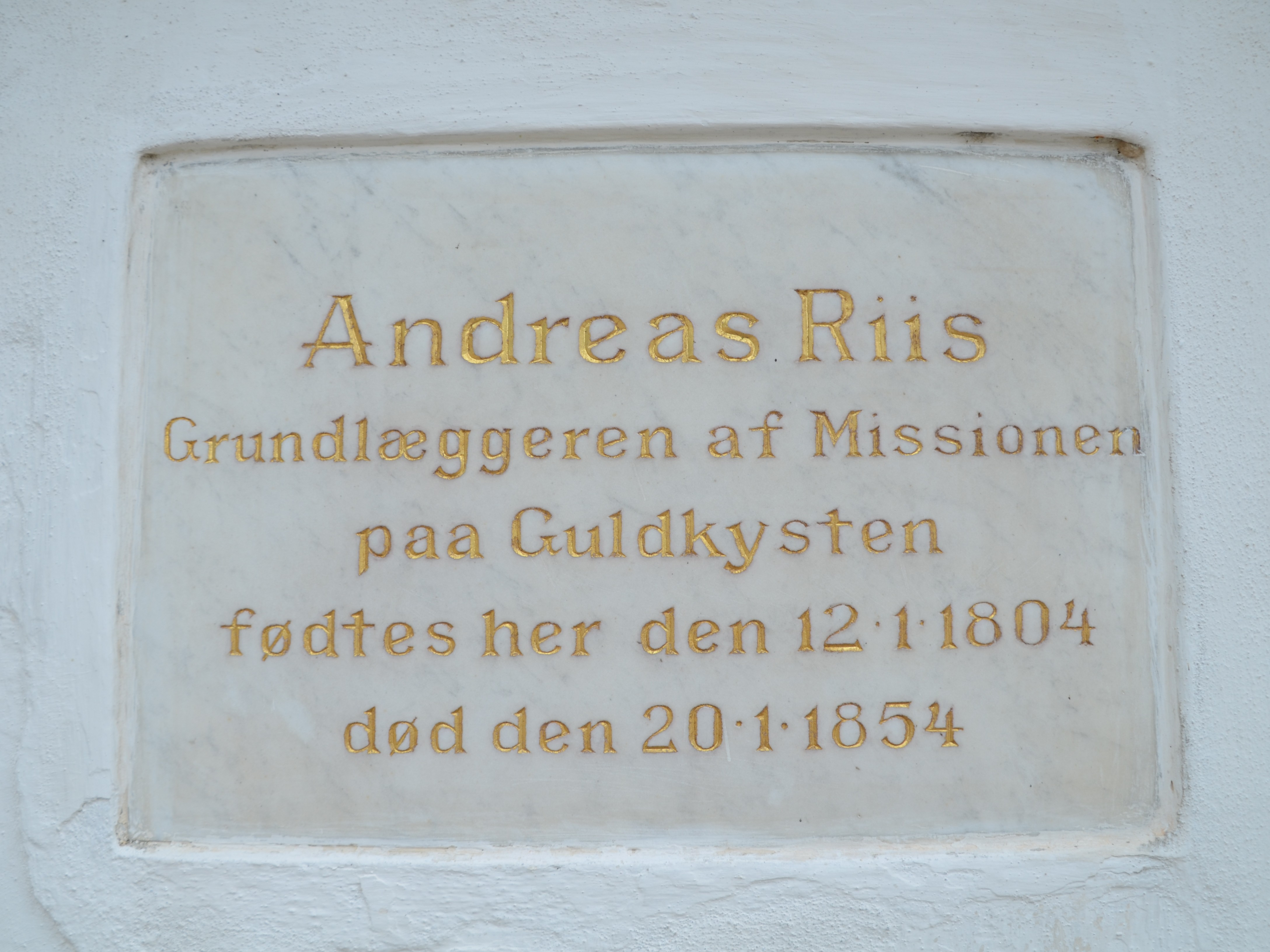
Plaque on Østergade 22, Løgumkloster

Andreas Riis was born on 12 January 1804 in a small artisan town, Løgumkloster in northern Duchy of Schleswig near the German-Danish border. Historians have described the town as one in which inhabitants had a strong work-ethic and missionary interests, in line with the Württemberg Pietism of the late 18th and early 19th centuries, inspired by German theologians Philipp Spenern and August Hermann Francke. In Pietist towns and villages, a traditional rural lifestyle was commonplace as were the local production and supply of food and occupations in the crafts such as carpentry, welding and blacksmithing. Andreas Riis' father, Andreas Petersen Riis (c. 1744 – 1819) was a farm owner, a window maker and a glazier. His mother was Anna Maria F. Philipsen (1765–1850). Riis' father had been married previously to an older woman, Maren Petersdatter (1728–1791). In his teenage years, Riis became an apprentice in his father's workshop. According to Riis, he "engaged in frivolous behaviour" in his youth. He later went through an existential evangelical experience, resulting in his personal decision to become a Christian missionary. He applied to the Basel Mission Seminary in Basel, Switzerland. In his application essay, he noted, "for some time, I pursued in the carelessness of youth and when my conscience spoke, I tried to quieten it by saying: 'there is yet ample time for the conversion, I want first to enjoy the pleasures of this world.' But I could not find any rest until I had surrendered my whole life to the dear Saviour." In 1827, Andreas Christian Matthiesson, a Lutheran minister wrote a recommendation letter for Riis for his admission to the seminary. Although Riis did not have much prior exposure to formal education, he easily received an admission offer based on his bilingualism in German and Danish, his conviction, work ethic, sense of purpose and determination – values conveyed in his application essay. After completing mandatory military service, Riis enrolled at the Basel Mission Seminary in 1828. He studied for almost five years at the training school and was consecrated a missionary at the Basel Minster in 1832 and shortly thereafter ordained a minister at a Lutheran church in Lörrach in Baden, Germany.

== Missionary activities on the Gold Coast ==
=== Early years ===
Riis then sailed to Accra on the Gold Coast together with Peter Petersen Jager, a Schleswig native, born in 1808 and Christian Friedrich Heinze, a medical doctor from Sachsen, born in 1804. They arrived in Christiansborg on 21 March 1832 and were received by a Ga-Danish Euro-African friend of the mission, George Lutterodt who assisted them in renting a house.

Earlier in March 1827, the Basel Mission had selected four young men from rural Switzerland and southern Germany between the ages of 23 and 27 years. These recruits were Karl F. Salbach (27), Gottlieb Holzwath (26), Johannes Henke (23) and the Swiss-born Johannes Gottlieb Schmidt (24). The men were skilled tradesmen with practical training experience in pottery, carpentry, shoe-making, masonry, joinery hat-making and black-smithing. The four missionaries arrived in Christiansborg on 18 December 1828 and had their first church service at a coastal enclave, Osu Amanfon on 28 December 1828. All but Johannes Henke died within eight months of their arrival (August 1829) from malaria and other tropical diseases. Henke eventually died on 22 November 1831.

Five weeks after the arrival of Riis and his colleagues, Christian Heinze died from malaria-induced fever and dysentery on 26 April 1832. In a letter dated 6 June 1832, to the Basel Home Committee, Riis described in graphic detail the debilitating nature of Heinze's illness. Peter Jager also died on 18 July 1832. At that point, the missionaries had just begun learning the Twi language. As the lone survivor of the trio, Riis sought to permanently return to Europe. Riis highlighted the bleak prospects of the mission due to the high death toll, in a letter to the Home Committee, dated 10 August 1832. The missionary mortality was accentuated in a bulletin on 9 January 1833 in which the Home Committee noted the death of as many as six missionaries by the summer of 1832. A follow-up letter on 16 January 1833 even suggested to Riis to entirely close the mission station.

After becoming ill from tropical fever two months later, Riis sought treatment with the Danish doctor at Christiansborg, Dr. Tietz but his condition worsened each day for the next week. Upon the recommendation of his mulatto trader friend, George Lutterodt, he went to a native African herbalist for treatment. The healing process consisted of washing the body with soap, lemon and cold water and drinking a boiled potion containing naturally occurring quinine from tree bark, which proved to be quite effective. Riis' decision to visit the traditional healer for his medication was considered an "abomination" by Westerners at the time due to misconceptions about the local culture which they perceived as "heathenism". However, his recovery vindicated him.

After his recovery, Riis, on the request of the then Governor, Helmuth von Ahrensdorf, became a minister at Christiansborg, under the supervision of the castle chaplain. Shortly after his appointment, the chaplain died and Riis assumed additional responsibilities as the chaplain, teacher and school manager in charge of the boys' and girls' castle schools for the next two years.

Lutterodt then advised Riis to move to the more isolated woody hilly countryside in Akropong – Akuapem where the climate is much cooler and had a more conducive environment for evangelisation due to a lack of acculturation in comparison to coastal towns. Riis also wanted to master the Twi language. As the Basel Mission was a separate non-political, international entity, Riis did not want to be viewed as colonial agent of the Danes.

The Danish colonial government did not take kindly to the decision by Riis to relocate to Akropong. The Danish authorities viewed the relocation as an intrusion on colonial control on the coast and a rejection of Danish Crown policies. As a result, Riis was legally prevented from abandoning the Christiansborg office of the chaplain until the arrival of a new Danish pastor in 1835. There were prior tensions between Riis and the Danes as well as colonial rivalry between the Danes and British – the English Governor, George Maclean (2 February 1801 – 22 May 1847) at the Cape Coast Castle had invited Riis to start a mission there which the Danish colonial administration objected to, as this could have created a political standoff with the Danish Governor, Frederick Siegfried Moerck. Riis had also been critical of the Danish Governor, Moerck's outward religiosity while pursuing a paganist hedonistic lifestyle. As punishment, Riis was detained at Christiansborg from May to June 1837. Moerck also meddled in Akuapem state politics, including a chieftaincy dispute between the Akwapem and the Guan, fearing the growing influence of the British in that area.

On 18 January 1834, Andreas Riis set out to visit Akropong with his friend George Lutterodt, arriving exactly a week later on 25 January after a respite on Lutterodt's inland plantation along the way. Amid fanfare and drumming, the duo were warmly received, on friendly terms, by the then Omanhene of Akuapem, Nana Addo Dankwa I. The king asked Riis to seek permission from the Danish Governor before the traditional stool could allow him to settle at Akropong. Akropong was then a town that was part of the Danish protectorate. He embarked on his next trip to Akropong on 19 March 1834 accompanied by a Danish colonial soldier, two servants and a "mulatto" interpreter. After consultation with his traditional elders and fetish priests, the paramount chieftain, Addo Dankwa gave land to Andreas Riis to set up a mission station. In the edition of the Mission Magazin in 1839, the Basel Mission's magazine, an article, "Riis: Missionsreise von Akropong in das Aquambu", celebrated Riis' exploits in the establishment of the Akropong mission station as a preliminary triumph of the sole Basel missionary survivor on the Gold Coast.

=== Ethnography ===
Andreas Riis finally moved and settled at Akropong on 26 March 1835. Riis built his solid timber house on stone foundation, almost entirely on his own as he refused to pay the Akropong natives in kind with brandy or gin. By February 1836, his house had been fully built. Furthermore, the locals were used to building round mud structures as opposed cuboid stone buildings. The locals named him "Osiadan", meaning "builder" in the Akan language. Riis ate local foods and spoke Akuapem Twi just like the people of Akropong. Riis lived like the locals at the time, spending weeks in the forest, sleeping on palm branches and feeding on peppersoup, snails and wormfish by some accounts. He also enjoyed the locally brewed beer, Pito, and freshly tapped palm wine, often whiling away the night in the palm wine tapper's hut with his friends.

In his role as an amateur naturalist and experimental ethnologist, Andreas Riis wrote several ethnographic and cartographic extracts on the natural landscape and cultural observations situated against his own European upbringing and experience. In the late 1830s and 1840s, he even sent specimens of seeds, insects and stuffed birds to Basel to be studied by experimentalists and for eventual display in the city's museum. With a pair of binoculars he had obtained on 14 June 1837 from arriving missionaries, Riis and two other missionaries, Andreas Stranger and Johannes Murdter toured the northeast towns and villages near the Volta River. Johannes Stanger died on Christmas Eve in 1837 and by 1840, Murdter had succumbed to tropical ailments too. In 1840, Andreas Riis, travelled through Akwamu, Shai, Kroboland, Akim Abuakwa, and Cape Coast and around New Year, arrived in the Ashanti capital, Kumasi where he spent two weeks and wrote observations on the traditional society there and what he perceived as the unfavourable and grim prospects for mission work.

=== Recruitment of West Indian volunteers ===
Riis' poor health condition, the rough terrain and the high mortality of European missionaries, sometimes reaching eighty percent, coupled with the failure of the missionary work compelled the Basel Missionary Society to abandon the work and recall Riis in 1839. For nearly eight years Riis had been unable to take credit for a single conversion and baptism of a native to Christianity. In the face of very unfavourable conditions, the Basel Mission authorities decided to recall Riis to Switzerland and the mission was to be closed. According to oral traditions, at the valedictory durbar organized in honour of Riis, the paramount chief, Okuapehene, Nana Addo Dankwa, is known to have remarked, "How can you expect so much from us? You have been staying among us all along for a short time only. When God created the world, He made the Book (Bible) for the European and animism (fetish) for the African, but if you could show us some Africans who could read the Bible, then we would surely follow you".

This chief's philosophical parting words gave Riis and the Basel Mission something worthy of consideration. The watershed moment for missions in Africa materialised when contacts were made to involve freed former slaves and their offspring from the Caribbean in the mission to Africa. A similar idea had been passed on by English missions in London to Basel but the final decision on West Indian recruitment was motivated by the chief's message to Riis.

Riis arrived at the Basel headquarters on 7 July 1840 and consulted with the Home Committee that had already decided to close the mission's West African station. Riis asked the committee to rethink their decision by narrating Addo Dankwa's farewell address to the Basel directors. They agreed to go to the West Indies to find suitable missionaries of African descent who could perhaps adapt quickly to the West African climate. After Riis left the Gold Coast, the Danes attempted to permanently ban Riis from re-entry into the Gold Coast. The issue was eventually resolved by the Home Committee on 31 January 1842.

In 1842, the Home Committee selected the Rev. Johan Georg Widmann, Hermann Halleur and the German-trained Americo-Liberian Basel missionary, George Peter Thompson to go to Jamaica to recruit black Christians. Andreas Riis, his wife, Anna Wolter, Widmann and Thompson left Basel for the British leeward island of Antigua in the West Indies with a transit in Liverpool to select mission recruits. The first station was St. Jan (now St. John US Virgin Islands) where Anna's brother, the missionary for the Moravian Church, Hans Haastrup Wolter worked and lived. They could not recruit any black Christians. They feared that they would be enslaved again. Meanwhile, Halleut went directly to the Gold Coast to prepare the grounds for their arrival. With the assistance of James Bruce, 8th Earl of Elgin, the Governor of Jamaica at the time, the Rev. Jacob Zorn, the Superintendent of the Moravian Mission in Jamaica, the Rev. J. F. Sessing and the Rev. J. Miller, a representative of the Africa Civilization Society, Riis was able to recruit candidates after a mass advertisement drive across the island and a thorough selection interview process. Many of the prospective candidates were deemed unfit for the task ahead: quite a few were lapsed Christians, one fellow was ecstatic about adventurism, including gold mining in Africa, another had a sick wife who as unable to travel while other potential recruits wished to go to the motherland as part of the "Back to Africa" movement, evangelism being of least importance to them. Riis and other Basel missionaries almost gave up on the initiative as finding the right missionaries became exceedingly difficult.

In a metaphor of the Biblical Joseph story, a team of 24 Jamaicans and one Antiguan (6 distinct families and 3 bachelors) sailed from the Jamaican Port of Kingston on 8 February 1843 aboard the Irish brigantine, The Joseph Anderson, rented for £600, and according to differing narratives, arrived in Christiansborg, Gold Coast on Easter Sunday, 16 April or Easter Monday, 17 April 1843 at about 8 p.m. local time, GMT after sixty-eight days and nights of voyage, enduring a five-day tropical storm on the Caribbean sea, shortage of fresh water and an oppressive heat aboard the vessel. A brief welcome event was organised by the Basel Mission at the Christiansborg Castle and the team was received by Edvard James Arnold Carstensen, the Danish Governor at the time, together with George Lutterodt, a personal friend of Andreas Riis who had earlier been Acting Governor of the Gold Coast. Their surnames included, Clerk, Greene, Hall, Horsford, Miller, Mullings, Robinson, Rochester and Walker.

Also accompanying the group was an Angolan-born, Jamaican trained teacher, Catherine Mulgrave who became school principal the Danish-run Christiansborg Castle School in Osu which had been taken over by the Basel Mission. Riis also had the Reverend J. G. Widmann, a German clergyman as his assistant. They also had donkeys, horses, mulls and other animals and agricultural seeds and cuttings such as mango seedlings which they were going to introduce to the Gold Coast economy. Other tropical seedlings brought by the West Indian missionaries include cocoa, coffee, breadnut, breadfruit, guava, yam, cassava, plantains, cocoyam, banana and pear. Cocoyam, for example, is now a Ghanaian staple. Later on in 1858, the missionaries experimented with cocoa planting at Akropong, more than two decades before Tetteh Quarshie brought cocoa seedlings to the Gold Coast from the island of Fernando Po, then a Portuguese protectorate.

Initially, Riis, as local President of the mission, had to be master of all trades: pastor, administrator, bursar, accountant, carpenter, architect and a public relations officer between the Mission and the traditional rulers. As more missionaries were recruited for the mission, the burden of administrator increased. Riis and another Basel missionary, Simon Süss were forced by the situation to trade and barter in order to get money to buy food and other needs of his expanding mission staff and local workers. The missionaries faced many difficulties and one of the many charges leveled against them by detractors was that they had become commercial traders instead of church missionaries. Riis and his men started evangelising to the rural people around Akropong, so the Basel Mission became colloquially known as "rural or bush" church. Riis wanted to evangelise inland and master Twi language spoken more widely in the hinterlands of the Gold Coast. By 1851, eight years after the arrival of the Caribbean missionaries, twenty-one Akropong natives had converted to Christianity.

== Management and leadership style ==
Riis had an authoritarian businesslike leadership style at the mission house. Riis had unconventional energy and believed in the supremacy of organisational authority. This was aggravated by the personal losses he suffered when he lost his entire nuclear family to tropical diseases. He had a tendency to "direct, regulate and command his subordinates" according to his "will and purpose." Yet, he intensely disliked the patriarchal hierarchy of the Basel Mission Home Committee whose members he described as "armchair evangelists" without any knowledge of missionary field work.

Riis' alleged self-centeredness, narrow-mindedness, inflexibility and unwillingness to compromise alienated him from his fellow missionaries leading to a deteriorated relationship with them. He was called stubborn, an impatient man and relentless. He was also accused in an 1845 Basel mission report by a colleague of meddling in local politics. The missionary, Widmann accused Riis of being thin-skinned and unable to accept criticism Riis belittled and defamed other missionaries using sarcasm and irony Some scholars have posited that extreme loneliness had affected Riis' psyche Sometimes, he left his family for several weeks to travel, even when his wife or child was sick.

Riis' treatment of his co-workers was described as unfairly severe. New missionaries could hardly cope with his authoritarian style of doing things. For instance, as a disciplinarian, Riis suspended and placed on probation the Americo-Liberian missionary, George Peter Thompson in 1845 for an alleged extra-marital affair with two women. Thompson had earlier been posted from Akropong to Christiansborg to help start an English language middle school, Salem School in November 1843.

== Alleged infractions, recall and dismissal ==
Due to fraught interpersonal relations with his missionary colleagues and locals, "the Home Committee requested a general summation of Riis' practices on the Gold Coast." Among his alleged crimes was the charge of financial irregularities - the renovation of his private house at Christiansborg using mission funds. His detractors also alleged that his tenant, a Danish alcoholic, Dr. Hansen sold rum on Riis' property, even on Sundays. He had also sold for profit the clothes which were to have been given to the West Indians.

Riis bought land at Abokobi for farming to be undertaken by the mission. Purchase costs amounted to forty-seven Danish rigsdaler. The agricultural proceeds were to be used to generate revenue through trading in order to fund the Basel mission activities on the Gold Coast. He informed the Home Committee of this new development. However, the farm workers were really indentured labourers and in some cases, domestic slaves. This was a violation of the protocol, ordinance and ethos of the Basel mission. He was also accused of barter trade in shot guns, gunpowder, flints and brandy, all strictly prohibited by the Basel Mission.

As a bachelor, Riis was also accused of sexual misconduct and daliances with multiple local women. Additionally he was rumoured to have fathered an illegitimate daughter with his Ga mistress at Christiansborg This allegation was made by the Basel missionary, Friedrich Schiedt in a letter to the Home Committee in Basel which was discussed by the board on 24 March 1847. It was noted that Schiedt frequently clashed with Riis.

Some of the complaints against Riis appeared exaggerated. In a report dated 13 December 1846, Schiedt stated that "Riis never acknowledges any fault – he cannot stand contradictions –he neglects his proper missionary work, even with his own houseboy. He had promised freedom for his slaves in the day of their baptism."

Schiedt, nonetheless, was also dismissed from the Gold Coast mission later for separate offences – multiple accusations of character assassination, habitual lateness, crudeness, insufficient piety, disparaging the Home Committee and threatening to become a Methodist. These claims mostly came from Schiedt's co-workers, Widmann, Stanger and Meischel. Schiedt also sabotaged the careers of his accusers. His other charges "included were accusations of mismanagement of Mission property, associated with a 'debauched' chaplain in the Danish settlement in Christiansborg, refusing legitimate orders from his superiors, and misappropriating the mail of his fellow missionaries, thus interfering with the lines of communication between the Committee and the field." As punishment, Schiedt was exiled to the United States where he became a Lutheran pastor to the German-speaking churches there.

Petty squabbles and backbiting were not uncommon. Another complaint by a fellow missionary, Hermann Halleur accused Riis of instigating general anxiety and conflict. Johann Georg Widmann on the other hand counter-accused Halleur of nurturing a deep hatred against Riis and having an attitude that made him extremely difficult to work with. Riis viewed Halleur as lazy and selfish and prone to mood swings. In the end, disillusioned and depressed, Halleur and another missionary resigned altogether from the Basel mission and returned to their respective hometowns.

The West Indian missionaries also petitioned the Basel Mission Inspector, recounting the ill-treatment they received at the hands of Andreas Riis. Some disagreements among the Caribbean missionaries over the distribution of clothing supplies resulted in the flogging of Antiguan, Jonas Horsford by a labourer-foreman, Ashong, at the behest of Riis. When the cane broke, Riis continued the "punishment" by punching Horsford with his fists while simultaneously, kicking him with his boots. Horsford, who was then in his early twenties, fled to Christiansborg, where he stayed with Basel missionary, Frederick Schiedt. He later returned to Akropong but had frequent verbal clashes with the Basel missionaries. Horsford wished to observe traditional practices of the natives such as funerals, cultural festivals and "fetish" dances. After being criticised by missionary, Johannes Christian Dieterle, he ran away to Accra and later, Cape Coast out of anger and humiliation. Upon his request, Jonas Horsford was voluntarily repatriated to Antigua but died at sea on his way home. This incident happened after J. G. Widmann reported to the Home Committee in 1844, about how Riis treated the West Indians. Another Basel missionary, Ernst Sebald noted that "the West Indians had their faults but were wrongly treated by Riis who had nevertheless good intentions. He thinks that the West Indians should live like the natives." Occasionally, Riis became violent against locals as well and verbally abused them during meals.

In August 1845, the Home Committee recalled Andreas Riis and his wife Anna Wolters to Basel so he could be afforded a fair hearing before a panel of missionaries responsible for enforcing discipline. On 13 August 1845 at 4p.m, he sailed from the Gold Coast to London. In London, he transferred to the Basel-bound ship Robert Heddle.

When he appeared before the committee, he boldly defended his actions on the Gold Coast. He contested the use of indentured labour on the mission farm as he believed he had bought the freedom of domestic slaves, including a ten-year-old boy, from slave traders and offered them a source of livelihood.

In 1846, the jury gave its verdict which was to revoke Riis' appointment to the Gold Coast and force his resignation from the Basel Mission, on grounds of deteriorating physical and mental health. In effect, Andreas Riis had been summarily dismissed from his post as a Basel missionary.

== Life after the Gold Coast ==
As per archival records, the Home Committee later paid Riis his pension regularly in acknowledgment of his twelve-year service to the society and as the main driver of Basel Mission activity on the Gold Coast. Andreas Riis entered new missionary work in the coastal town of Grimstad in southern Norway a short while later and became a travelling preacher and a chaplain of the Danish Missionary Society until his death in 1854.

== Personal life and family ==
After settling for a year on the Gold Coast, circa 1834, and with the approval of the Home Committee of the Basel Mission, Riis arranged to get a wife, Anna Margaretha Wolter, a twenty year old Danish woman who was described as pious, anaemic, sickly, and talented. She was born on 12 March 1815 in Fåborg in southern Denmark. She was a member of the Moravian Church. Her father was a thrice-widowed shoemaker, Hans Jacob Wolter (c. 1766 – 1827) who first married a young widow, Margaretha Christophersdatter (c. 1760 – 1804) who had previously been married to an innkeeper, Anders Hansen (c. 1748 – 1789). When Margaretha Christophersdatter died, H. J. Wolter married a second time, to Maren Kirstine Haastrup (c. 1775 – 1811). After the death of Haastrup in 1811, Hans Wolter married his third wife and Anna Margaretha Wolters' mother, Johanne Jacobsen, born c. 1775 and died in 1820.

Among those who came with Wolter in 1835 were the Basel missionaries, Andreas Stanger and Johannes Murdter. Riis married Wolter in December 1836 on the Gold Coast. Andreas Riis and Anna Wolter had three children, Johannam, Hanna and Christian. Johannam died at the close of 1838. Hanna married Theodor Sarasin- Bischoff from Basel Switzerland. On 5 September 1845 Riis' wife Anna Riis died from dysentery and fever, on the voyage to Europe from Christiansborg and she was buried at sea in the Gulf of Guinea. Prior to her death, she was in a coma and limp on the left side of her body.

After moving to Norway, Andreas Riis remarried on 8 September 1849 to Hilleborg Pharo who was christened on 24 February 1814 in Grimstad. Pharo died on 28 September 1900 in Frederikshald. Pharo was the daughter of Christian Rosenberg Pharo (1767–1848), a merchant, shipowner and consul. and his second wife, Sofie Amalie Smith (1778–1836). Christian Pharo was also a widower who had earlier been married to Margrete Gjertsdatter Langfeldt (1767–1800).

Andreas Riis had an older brother, Christian Riis, a shoemaker born on 24 October 1797 in Løgumkloster and died in the same town on 15 January 1877 at the age of 79. Christian Riis married Christine Ingeborg Geerdsen on 2 June 1820 in Løgumkloster. The couple had six children:

- Johan Friedrich Riis
- Andreas Riis, born on 27 September 1819 in Løgumkloster and died of natural causes in the same town on 1 April 1900 at the age of 80 years
- Maria Riis, born on 18 September 1823 in Løgumkloster
- Johann Friedrich Riis, born on 24 July 1826 in Løgumkloster.
- Johann Friedrich Riis, born on 7 November 1829 in Løgumkloster
- Peter Christian Riis, born on 12 March 1837 in Løgumkloster. On 7 June 1867 when he was 30 years old, Peter Riis married an older woman, Marie Andersen. Andersen was born on 11 December 1827 in the town of Emmerske in Denmark and was the daughter of Niels Andersen and Marie F. Simonsen. Peter and Marie Riis had no children. Marie Riis died on 13 February 1905 in Løgumkloster at the age 78. In 1860, Peter Christian Riis was a farmer in Sorø, living within the vicinity of the town square. In 1907 when he was 70 years, he remarried an unnamed Danish woman.

Another nephew of Andreas Riis was Hans Nicolai Riis (27 January 1822 – 14 July 1890) who arrived in Akropong as a missionary in 1845. In 1850, he returned to Europe as a result of ill-health. Hans Riis lived in Basel from 1850 to 1858. He moved to the United States, where he lived from 1858 to 1869. He became a parish priest in Reisby in Nordslesvig. H. N. Riis published a grammar book and glossary in the Twi language in 1853.

== Death and legacy ==
Andreas Riis died on 13 January 1854 at the age of 50 in Naksby near Grimstad, Norway. Other historical sources list an alternate date of death as 20 January 1854. His remains were buried at Fjære Church in the old Fjære Municipality (now part of Grimstad Municipality). In October 1854, Riis' obituary was published in the tenth issue of the Basel Mission's bulletin, Der Evangelische Heidenbote. Framed as a tragic character and what Jon Miller called a "strategic deviant", Riis' complex legacy is connected to his personal traits: charisma, Pietist strength, stamina, audacity, persuasion, imagination, ingenuity, strong will, persistence or tenacity to survive on the Gold Coast leading to the endurance of the Basel mission, in spite of difficulties encountered in the early years, including loneliness in a faraway land, alienation from his colleagues, the loss of his entire nuclear family to disease and external circumstances pertaining to inter-ethnic conflict. Riis' efforts led to the streamlining of the Basel mission's work. This eventually led to the establishment of the Presbyterian Church of Ghana and its pioneering role in the development of formal education, mechanised agriculture, infrastructure, modern healthcare and the expansion of economic opportunities for the native people of the Gold Coast through commerce and industry in the arts and crafts over a ninety-year period, between 1828 and 1918. A boarding house, Riis House, at the Presbyterian Boys' Secondary School, Legon was named in his memory. The Presbyterian Book Depot in Kumasi was named A-Riis Company Limited in his honour. A branch of the Presbyterian Church of Ghana in Copenhagen was named after Andreas Riis. In 1958, a memorial plaque was unveiled at Riis' birthplace in his hometown, Løgumkloster in Southern Jutland. A 1958 scholarly piece authored by the Swiss German church historian and theologian, Hans Werner Debrunner, on Riis' life dubbed him, albeit in hagiographic and hyperbolic terms, as the "Moses of the Ghana Presbyterian Church".
