= Vik, Grimstad =

Village in Grimstad Municipality, Norway

Vik
- Village
- Interactive map of Vik
- Coordinates: 58.3683°N 08.6227°E
- Country: Norway
- Region: Southern Norway
- County: Agder
- District: Østre Agder
- Municipality: Grimstad Municipality
- Elevation: 44 m (144 ft)
- Time zone: UTC+01:00 (CET)
  - Summer (DST): UTC+02:00 (CEST)
- Post Code: 4885 Grimstad

Vik is a village in Grimstad Municipality in Agder county, Norway. The village is located at the northern end of the Kilen bay that flows past the town of Grimstad. The village sits at the junction of Norwegian County Road 420 and Norwegian County Road 407 on the south side of the European route E18 highway. The historic Fjære Church lies about 1 kilometre (0.62 mi) west of the village.

== History ==
The village was the administrative centre of the old Fjære Municipality which existed until 1971.
