= Fevikmoen =

Historic farm property in Fevik, Grimstad, Norway

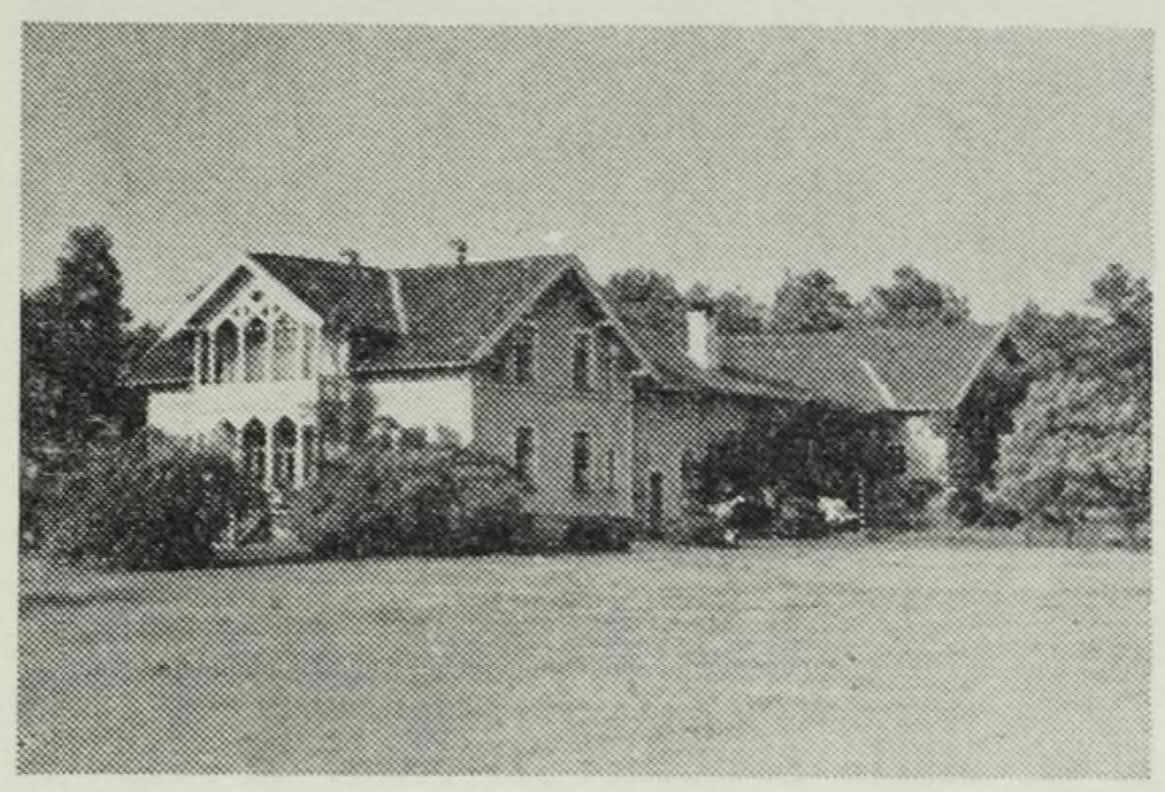
- Fevikmoen (house name Fjeldly), photographed for Norges bebyggelse (1956)
- Interactive map of Fevikmoen
- 58°22′44.4″N 8°41′02.5″E
- Type: Historic farm and archaeological site
- Location: Fevik, Grimstad Municipality, Agder, Norway

History
- Built: 1886 (present farmhouse)

Fevikmoen (historically spelled Fevigmoen, Feeuigmoen, and Fævigmoen) is the historical name of a former farm property and archaeological site located in Fevik, in present-day Grimstad Municipality in Agder county, Norway. Formerly part of Fjære Municipality, Fevikmoen is among the oldest documented farm properties in the area and is historically associated with the registered Iron Age burial field Fevikmoen, Gravfelt (Lokalitet 43176) in Norway’s national cultural heritage database (Askeladden), an automatically protected archaeological site consisting of at least eleven burial mounds, several of which historically had standing stones (bautasteiner).

Historically the property functioned as a mixed agricultural farm typical of coastal Agder, with connections to maritime trade and later to early seaside tourism in Fevik. During the 20th century much of the farmland associated with Fevikmoen was subdivided as the surrounding area developed into a residential suburb, though the historic farmhouse remains standing.

== History ==
=== Prehistoric and early history ===
The area around Fevikmoen forms part of a documented archaeological landscape containing numerous burial mounds. In 1838, antiquarian Nicolay Nicolaysen recorded extensive burial remains in the vicinity of Fevik, Fevikmoen and neighbouring farms in his survey of Norwegian antiquities, later published in Norske fornlevninger. Nicolaysen described dozens of burial mounds and standing stones in the area, including several particularly large mounds that were prominent in the landscape.

Archaeological investigations of the burial landscape in the Fevik–Trålum area date back to the 19th century. In 1880 the archaeologist Th. Winther excavated several burial mounds in the area for Arendal Museum, recovering grave goods that helped establish the chronology of the cemetery. Later research has shown that the burial field extended across several historic farm properties, including Fevik, Fevikmoen and neighbouring Trålum farms.

A detailed archaeological inventory carried out for the national economic mapping project documented an Iron Age burial field spanning the farms of Fevikmoen and neighboring Trålum properties. The survey recorded at least eleven burial mounds, several with standing stones, distributed across an area roughly 100 metres by 100 metres. Archaeological finds from the mounds date from the late Roman Iron Age through the Migration Period and into the Viking Age. A broader survey of ancient monuments in Fjære recorded a total of 33 burial mounds across the neighboring farms of Fevik, Fevikmoen and Trålum, with archaeologists identifying the main concentration of mounds on the properties of Fevik and Fevikmoen.

A 3D scan of one of the standing stones described by Nicolay Nicolaysen

The burial field registered as Fevikmoen, Gravfelt (site 43176) in Norway’s national cultural heritage database (Askeladden) includes at least eleven burial mounds, several dated to the Iron Age (c. 500 BC – AD 1050). The site has been documented in modern archaeological surveys and was subject to control registration by archaeologists in 2025.

Local reporting has also highlighted the extent of the prehistoric burial landscape around Fevikmoen. A feature in Grimstad Adressetidende noted that more than 120 graves once existed in the wider Fevik area, though modern development has reduced the number of visible burial mounds to roughly thirty. The surviving mounds at Fevikmoen form part of a protected archaeological area connected with the historic grave fields of nearby farms.

Burial mounds in coastal Agder are commonly associated with long-term settlement and often served as visible markers in the landscape. Historical sources note that at least one burial mound on the Fevikmoen property was removed during later agricultural development.

=== Farm history and name ===
Early documentary sources indicate that Fevikmoen originated as part of the larger Fevik farm in Fjære Church parish. In early tax records from 1610, landowners associated with the Fevig estate are listed among the odelsbønder of the parish. In the land register of 1665, Fevigmoen was recorded as a separate cadastral holding with a tax value of one-half hud, while the remainder of the Fevig estate retained a higher assessed value.

The farm name appears in written sources from the early modern period with varying spellings, including Feeuigmoen in the 17th century and Fævigmoen in 1723. The element moen refers to meadow or cleared farmland, indicating fertile agricultural land. Historically, Fevikmoen was a substantially larger holding than it is today and functioned as a mixed agricultural farm typical of the Sørlandet region.

A mortgage register (panteregister) for Nedenes sorenskriveri also records the property under the name Fævigmoen in an entry dated 22 March 1785, referring to a deed concerning the farm recorded in the regional deed books.

=== Ownership and development ===
Historical records document a sequence of owners and occupants at Fevikmoen dating back to at least the early 17th century. Documented residents include odelsfolk, farmers, and later maritime professionals such as ship captains. Among those recorded are Christopher Pedersøn Fevigmoen (1624), Peder Christophersen and Gunnild Olsdatter in the late 18th century, and skipper Peder Nielsen and Anne Kristine Ellingsdatter in the mid-19th century.

During the 19th century, Fevikmoen followed a common coastal Agder economic pattern combining agriculture with maritime livelihoods.

In July 1886 the earlier farmhouse and outbuildings at Fevikmoen were destroyed by fire. Contemporary reports noted that part of the household furniture was saved, but crops, farm equipment, a horse, and a cow were lost. The buildings were insured for 12,000 kroner and the household contents for 9,000 kroner.

Following the fire, the property was rebuilt under the ownership of Gunder Tellefsen (1828–1904), a farmer and ship owner originally from Birketveit in Fjære Municipality. Tellefsen settled at Fevikmoen in the second half of the nineteenth century and operated the property as a working farm while also maintaining interests in maritime trade, a common economic pattern along the southern Norwegian coast.

A national building survey published in Norges bebyggelse records that the farm's two-storey main house was constructed in 1886, reflecting rebuilding after the fire. The property also retained a substantial barn, representing the agricultural core of the farm and surviving later periods of subdivision that altered much of the surrounding landscape.

In 1926, a newspaper notice reported that Marie Tellefsen sold the property Fevikmoen (gnr. 51, bnr. 1) in Fjære to Johan Senumstad of Birkenes.

Following the German occupation of Norway during the Second World War, the property was owned by Sverre Dagfinn Lilleeide. Contemporary reports noted that Lilleeide's assets, including the property Fevikmoen and the motor vessel Fevik I, were subject to confiscation proceedings due to his service with German military units during the war.

In 1948, Gunnar Ilebekk applied for a concession to purchase Fevikmoen (gnr. 51, bnr. 1) in Fjære from Gunhild Hansen, stating that he intended to operate the property as both a farm and a summer boarding house. Contemporary reports noted that the estate comprised approximately 24 mål of cultivated land and 31 mål of forest, and that it had previously been advertised for sale in both local and Oslo newspapers before being sold for 50,000 kroner.

In 1958 the property Fevikmoen (gnr. 51, bnr. 1) was scheduled for foreclosure auction at the request of Hypotekbanken. The sale was announced by the Landvik and Fjære sheriff’s office due to an outstanding mortgage registered in 1947.

=== Maritime connections ===
Historical accounts connected to Fevikmoen include references to maritime activity and risk. A documented mid-19th-century ship loss (Courier), which occurred in 1857, is associated with members of the household and illustrates the close relationship between the farm and the regional shipping economy.

=== Tourism and early 20th century ===
Fevikmoen participated in Fevik's early seaside tourism development around the turn of the 20th century. Census records from 1900 describe the farm (spelled Fevigmoen in the census) as a mixed agricultural holding with livestock, poultry, a kitchen garden and fruit orchard, and note that members of the household operated a summer boarding house (pensjonat).

A newspaper advertisement from 1914 described the property as an established guesthouse with electric lighting, spring water, and orchard grounds, noting that the pensionat had already been in operation for approximately fifteen years.

Municipal records further confirm the operation of Fevikmoen pensjonat; in 1941 the Fjære municipal council granted a hospitality licence for the establishment.

This activity coincided with the broader development of Fevik as a summer destination along the southern Norwegian coast.

=== Subdivision and modern period ===
During the early 20th century, several parcels were formally separated from the main Fevikmoen farm, including properties such as Furuly, Ekelund, and Fjeldly. Additional subdivisions followed through the mid-20th century as Fevik expanded as a residential area. Despite this, the main house and barn remained together as the core of the former farm, preserving an important fragment of Fevik's historic agricultural landscape.

During renovation work in 2016, several historical letters were discovered concealed within the wall paneling of the house. The correspondence was traced to Gunder Tellefsen and dates to the late nineteenth century, providing additional documentation of the property's maritime and agricultural history.

== Cultural significance ==
Fevikmoen is notable for:

- Its historical association with the registered Iron Age burial field Fevikmoen, Gravfelt (Lokalitet 43176) in Norway’s national cultural heritage database (Askeladden), documenting prehistoric activity in the area.
- Long continuity as a named farm property in the former parish of Fjære.
- The surviving 1886 main house and associated historic agricultural buildings.
- Its documented connection to the agricultural, maritime, and early tourism history of coastal Agder.
