= Ugland (disambiguation) =

Ugland may refer to:

- J. J. Ugland, a group of shipping companies based in Grimstad, Norway
- Karl Ugland, a Norwegian politician for the Liberal Party of Norway
- Ugland House, a building located in George Town, Cayman Islands
- Andreas Ugland, a shipping magnate based in George Town, Cayman Islands
