= Stafa Industrier =

Stafa Industrier AS
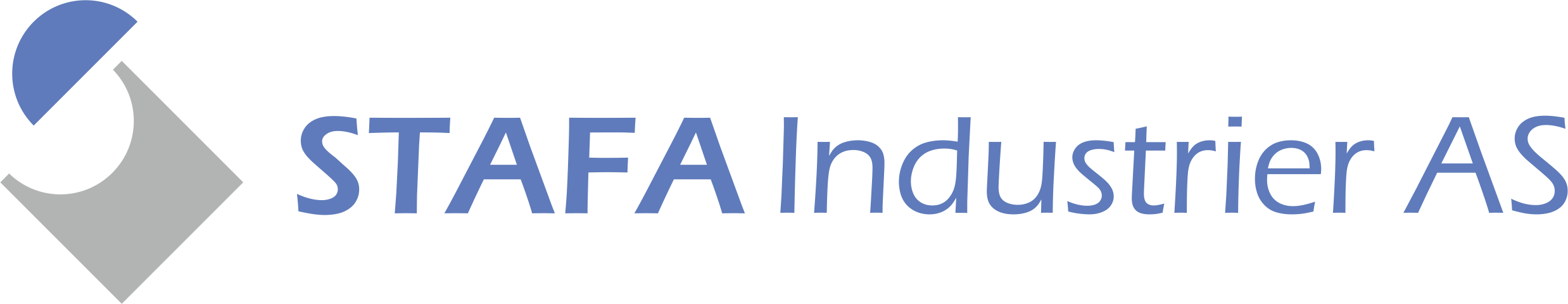
- Type: private limited company
- Industry: Sheet metal subsupply & products
- Founded: 1985
- Headquarters: Grimstad, Norway
- Area served: Worldwide
- Key people: Ingvar Apeland (CEO) John Harald Megaard (CCO)
- Products: Sheet metal sub-contracting; electro cabinets; post-boxes, fire & safety products
- Revenue: NOK+682 million (2025)
- Number of employees: 400+ (December 2025)

Stafa Industrier AS, headquartered in Grimstad, Norway, is the parent company of a group of companies primarily offering manufacturing services and products from sheet-metal: Stansefabrikken Products AS, Stansefabrikken Home AS, Stansefabrikken Solutions AS, UAB Stansefabrikken Automotive Lithuania, UAB Stansefabrikken Lithuania and UAB Ukmerge Pramones Parkas Lithuania.

== History ==
The Stansefabrikken Group originates from the company Den Norske Stansefabrik first established in Oslo, Norway in 1932 and transferred to Lillesand in 1947. In 1985, after Den Norske Stansefabrik went bankrupt, the current main owners took over the operations and formed "Stansefabrikken Lillesand AS". Since then, through acquisitions and forming of new companies, the business has grown into a company group with a parent company, Stafa Industrier AS (Stansefabrikken Group).

== Description ==
Stafa Industrier AS operates in five main areas of business: Sheet metal subcontracting, Automotive, Products (electrical cabinets, fuse cabinets, house-centrals, shop fitting equipment and post & distribution boxes out of sheet metal), product development & engineering, renting of premises (industrial park in Ukmergė, Lithuania). Stafa Industrier AS manages of 7 subsidiaries with a total number of approximately 400 employees:

- Stansefabrikken Products AS and Stansefabrikken Home AS is companies which markets its own products as well as trading products: post & distribution box systemses, electrical cabinets, switch gears, fire and safety products and others. The companies are based in Norway.
- UAB Stansefabrikken is a sheet metal sub-contracting company whose core business is medium/large serial production. The company is based in Ukmergė, Lithuania.
- Stansefabrikken Solutions AS is a sheet metal sub-contracting company which core business is small batch production, product development, engineering and prototyping. The company is based in Grålum, Norway.
- UAB Stansefabrikken Automotive is the company producing stamped parts for automotive industry and high-volume production for the general industry. The company is based in Ukmergė, Lithuania.
- UAB "Ukmergės pramonės parkas" is the company managing a modern industrial park it is located in.
