= Fjære Municipality =

Former municipality in Aust-Agder, Norway

Fjære Municipality Fjære kommune
- Former municipality
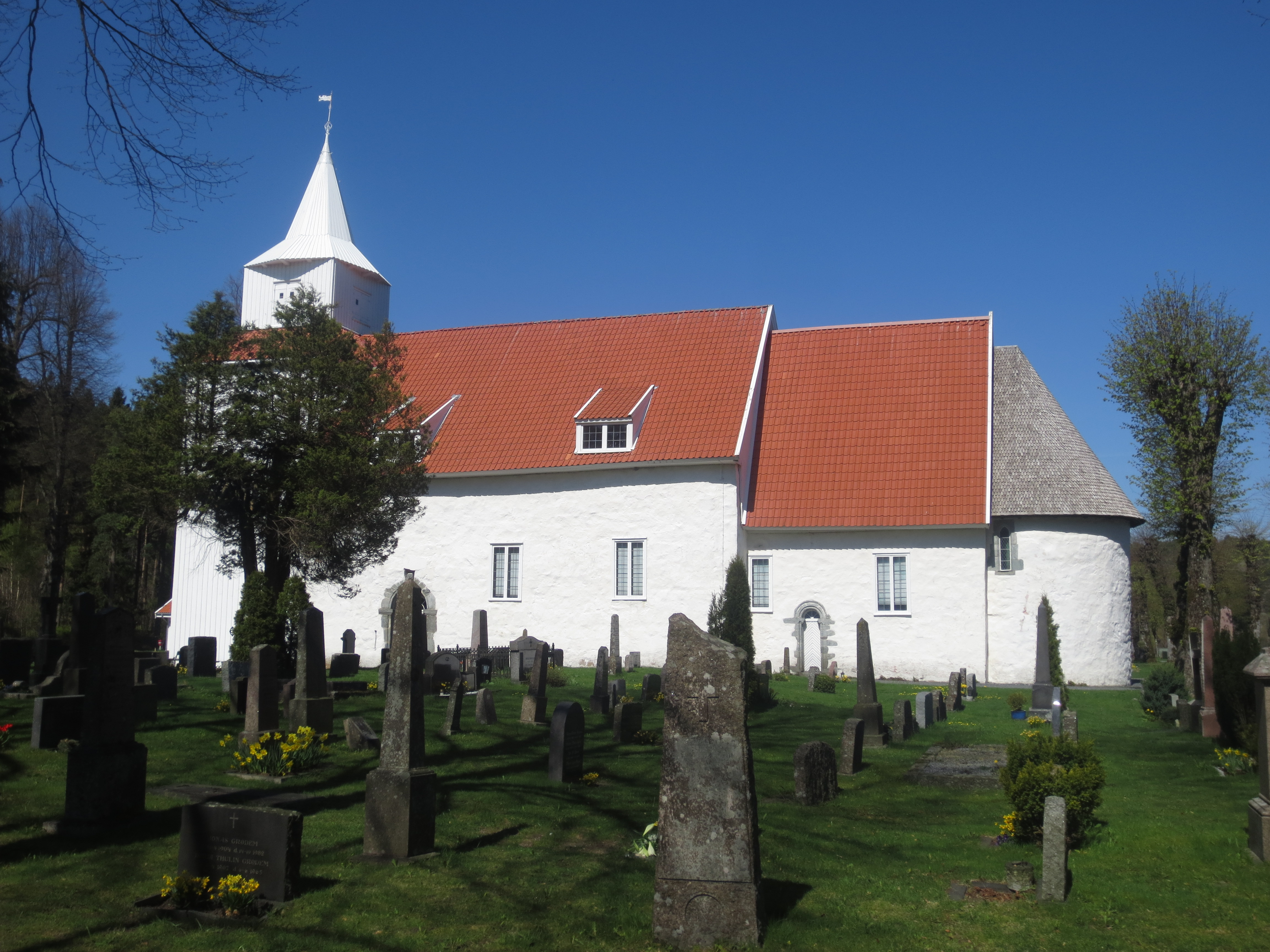
- View of Fjære Church

- Aust-Agder within Norway

- Fjære within Aust-Agder
- Coordinates: 58°21′58″N 08°35′40″E
- Country: Norway
- County: Aust-Agder
- District: Østre Agder
- Established: 1 Jan 1846
  - Preceded by: Øyestad Municipality
- Disestablished: 1 Jan 1971
  - Succeeded by: Grimstad Municipality
- Administrative centre: Vik

Government
  - Mayor (1967–1970): Sigurd Stie (V)

Area (upon dissolution)
  - Total: 61.8 km^{2} (23.9 sq mi)
  - Rank: #415 in Norway
- Highest elevation: 149.7 m (491 ft)

Population (1970)
  - Total: 6,143
  - Rank: #164 in Norway
  - Density: 99.4/km^{2} (257/sq mi)
  - Change (10 years): ▲ +19.7%
- Demonym: Fjæresokning

Official language
  - Norwegian form: Bokmål
- Time zone: UTC+01:00 (CET)
  - Summer (DST): UTC+02:00 (CEST)
- ISO 3166 code: NO-0923

Fjære is a former municipality in the old Aust-Agder county, Norway. The 61.8-square-kilometre (23.9 sq mi) municipality existed from 1846 until its dissolution in 1971. The area is now part of Grimstad Municipality in the traditional district of Østre Agder in Agder county. The administrative centre was the village of Vik, just east of the historic Fjære Church. Other villages in the municipality included Fevik, Dømmesmoen, Frivoll, Kroken, and Rønnes.

Prior to its dissolution in 1971, the 61.8-square-kilometre (23.9 sq mi) municipality was the 415th largest by area out of the 451 municipalities in Norway. Fjære Municipality was the 164th most populous municipality in Norway with a population of about 6,143. The municipality's population density was 99.4 inhabitants per square kilometre (257/sq mi) and its population had increased by 19.7% over the previous 10-year period.

== General information ==
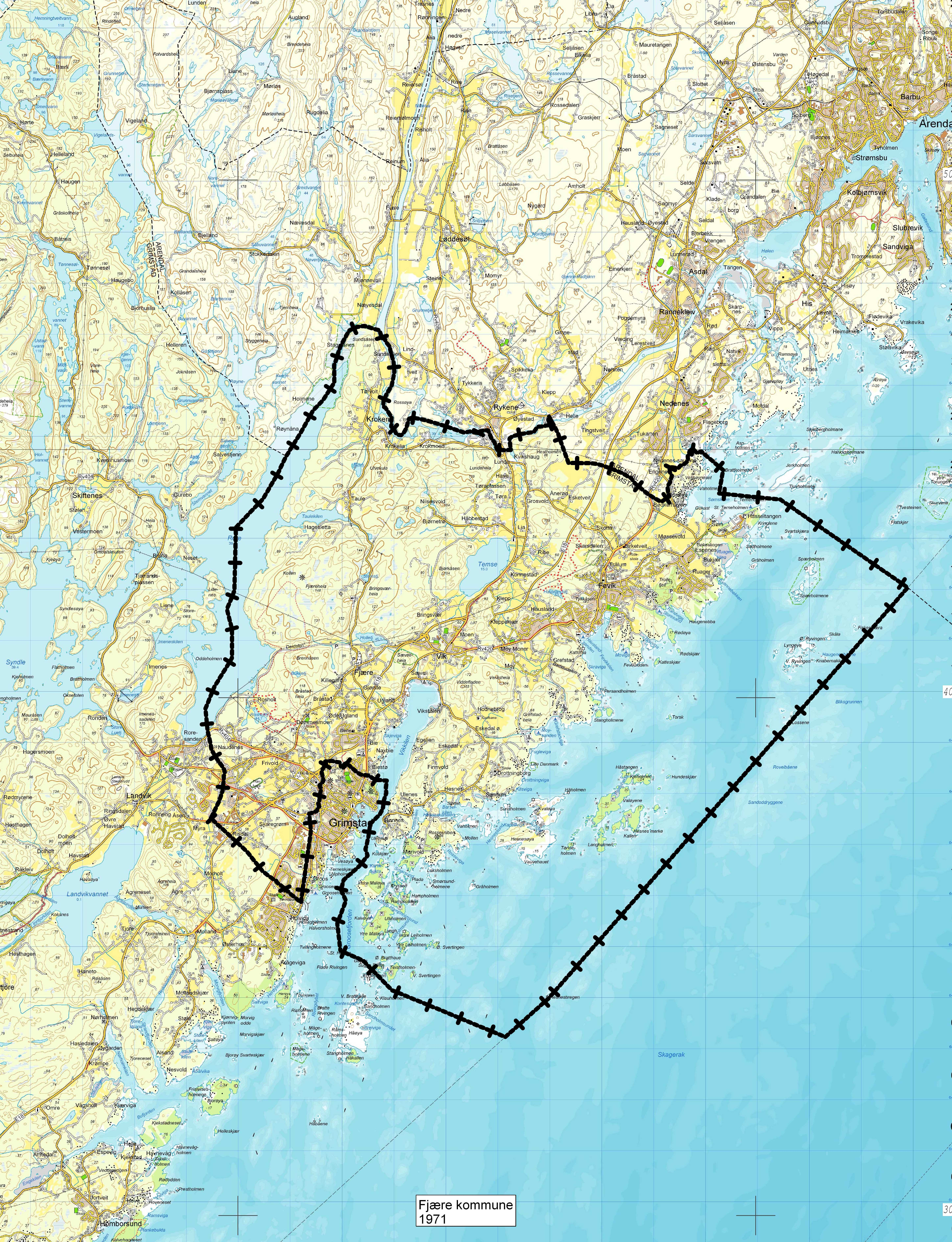
Map of Fjære Municipality

The municipality of Fjære was established on 1 January 1846 when Øyestad Municipality was divided into two: the southern district (population: 2,806) became the new Fjære Municipality and the northern district (population: 5,215) continued as a smaller Øyestad Municipality. The first municipal council met at a farmhouse at Bringsvær, north of Vik. In 1886, the council began meeting in the village of Vik.

On 1 January 1878, a part of Fjære Municipality located adjacent to the town of Grimstad (population: 948) was transferred from Fjære Municipality to Grimstad Municipality. Again, on 1 January 1960, another part of Fjære Municipality located next to the town of Grimstad (population: 344) was transferred from Fjære Municipality to Grimstad Municipality.

On 1 January 1971, Fjære Municipality was dissolved and the following areas were merged to form an enlarged Grimstad Municipality:

- all of Fjære Municipality (population: 6,189)
- all of Grimstad Municipality (population: 2,794)
- all of Landvik Municipality (population: 2,781)

=== Name ===
The municipality (originally the parish) is named after the old Fjære farm (Fjarðar) since the historic Fjære Church was built there. The name is the genitive case of the word fjǫrðr which means "firth" or "fjord".

=== Churches ===
The Church of Norway had one parish (sokn) within Fjære Municipality. At the time of the municipal dissolution, it was part of the Fjære prestegjeld and the Vest-Nedenes prosti (deanery) in the Diocese of Agder.

Churches in Fjære Municipality
Parish (sokn)	Church name	Location of the church	Year built
Fjære	Fjære Church	Fjære	c. 1150

== Geography ==
The highest point in the municipality was the 149.7-metre (491 ft) tall mountain Fjæreheia. Øyestad Municipality was located to the north, Hisøy Municipality was located to the northeast, the Skagerrak is located to the east, Grimstad Municipality was located to the south, and Landvik Municipality was located to the west.

== Government ==
While it existed, Fjære Municipality was responsible for primary education (through 10th grade), outpatient health services, senior citizen services, welfare and other social services, zoning, economic development, and municipal roads and utilities. The municipality was governed by a municipal council of directly elected representatives. The mayor was indirectly elected by a vote of the municipal council. The municipality was under the jurisdiction of the Sand District Court and the Agder Court of Appeal.

=== Municipal council ===
The municipal council (Kommunestyre) of Fjære Municipality was made up of 25 representatives that were elected to four year terms. The tables below show the historical composition of the council by political party.

Fjære kommunestyre 1967–1971
Party name (in Norwegian)	Number of representatives
Labour Party (Arbeiderpartiet)	11
Conservative Party (Høyre)	6
Christian Democratic Party (Kristelig Folkeparti)	4
Centre Party (Senterpartiet)	1
Liberal Party (Venstre)	3
Total number of members:	25
Note: On 1 January 1971, Fjære Municipality became part of Grimstad Municipality.

Fjære kommunestyre 1963–1967
Party name (in Norwegian)	Number of representatives
Labour Party (Arbeiderpartiet)	10
Conservative Party (Høyre)	7
Christian Democratic Party (Kristelig Folkeparti)	5
Centre Party (Senterpartiet)	1
Liberal Party (Venstre)	2
Total number of members:	25

Fjære herredsstyre 1959–1963
Party name (in Norwegian)	Number of representatives
Labour Party (Arbeiderpartiet)	10
Conservative Party (Høyre)	7
Christian Democratic Party (Kristelig Folkeparti)	5
Centre Party (Senterpartiet)	1
Liberal Party (Venstre)	2
Total number of members:	25

Fjære herredsstyre 1955–1959
Party name (in Norwegian)	Number of representatives
Labour Party (Arbeiderpartiet)	9
Conservative Party (Høyre)	7
Christian Democratic Party (Kristelig Folkeparti)	4
Farmers' Party (Bondepartiet)	2
Liberal Party (Venstre)	3
Total number of members:	25

Fjære herredsstyre 1951–1955
Party name (in Norwegian)	Number of representatives
Labour Party (Arbeiderpartiet)	8
Conservative Party (Høyre)	7
Christian Democratic Party (Kristelig Folkeparti)	3
Farmers' Party (Bondepartiet)	1
Liberal Party (Venstre)	5
Total number of members:	24

Fjære herredsstyre 1947–1951
Party name (in Norwegian)	Number of representatives
Labour Party (Arbeiderpartiet)	7
Conservative Party (Høyre)	7
Communist Party (Kommunistiske Parti)	1
Christian Democratic Party (Kristelig Folkeparti)	2
Farmers' Party (Bondepartiet)	2
Joint list of the Liberal Party (Venstre) and the Radical People's Party (Radikale Folkepartiet)	5
Total number of members:	24

Fjære herredsstyre 1945–1947
Party name (in Norwegian)	Number of representatives
Labour Party (Arbeiderpartiet)	8
Conservative Party (Høyre)	6
Communist Party (Kommunistiske Parti)	2
Christian Democratic Party (Kristelig Folkeparti)	2
Farmers' Party (Bondepartiet)	2
Joint list of the Liberal Party (Venstre) and the Radical People's Party (Radikale Folkepartiet)	4
Total number of members:	24

Fjære herredsstyre 1937–1941*
Party name (in Norwegian)	Number of representatives
Labour Party (Arbeiderpartiet)	7
Conservative Party (Høyre)	9
Farmers' Party (Bondepartiet)	2
Liberal Party (Venstre)	6
Total number of members:	24
Note: Due to the German occupation of Norway during World War II, no elections were held for new municipal councils until after the war ended in 1945.

=== Mayors ===
The mayor (Norwegian: ordfører) of Fjære Municipality was the political leader of the municipality and the chairperson of the municipal council. The following people have held this position:

- 1838–1838: Christian Juell
- 1839–1839: Nils Gundersen
- 1840–1841: Daniel Vigeland
- 1842–1843: Kittel Nilsen
- 1844–1845: Aanon Aanonsen
- 1846–1849: Steffen Steffensen
- 1849–1849: Gjert Sørensen
- 1849–1853: Niels Olsen Ribe
- 1853–1855: Steffen Steffensen
- 1855–1858: Gunder Nielsen Skotta
- 1859–1862: Hans Ommundsen Konnestad
- 1863–1867: Gunder Nielsen Skotta
- 1868–1869: Jørgen Tellefsen Ugland
- 1869–1873: Hans Ommundsen Konnestad
- 1874–1877: Jørgen Tellefsen Ugland
- 1878–1881: Carl Anton Boe
- 1881–1885: Knud K. Lien
- 1885–1886: Asbjørn Knutsen
- 1886–1887: Mathias Hørthe
- 1887–1891: Knud K. Lien
- 1891–1893: Knud Andersen Grevstad
- 1893–1898: Ole Andersen Grevstad
- 1898–1910: Ommund Tellefsen Ugland
- 1910–1916: Gregorius Mjaaland
- 1916–1916: Klemmet Lofthus
- 1917–1923: Peder K. Grevstad
- 1923–1925: Anders Asdal
- 1925–1925: Ole Ribe
- 1926–1931: Peder K. Grevstad
- 1932–1937: Karl Danielsen
- 1938–1941: Olaf Tønnevold
- 1941–1945: Tørres Danielsen (NS)
- 1945–1945: Olaf Tønnevold
- 1946–1947: Thor Håversen
- 1948–1955: Karl Ugland
- 1956–1959: Sigmund Olsen
- 1960–1967: Johan Jørgen Ugland (H)
- 1967–1970: Sigurd Stie (V)

== Attractions ==
=== Fjære Church ===
Fjære Church (Fjære kirke) is made of stone and dates back to the middle of the 12th century. Despite being 850 years old, it is an active parish church. It was not completed in one generation, but was created gradually over the centuries. The church grew together with the village and the people, and became the centre of Fjære's history from the Middle Ages until the present day. The oldest and most valuable individual cultural monuments in and around Fjære Church are the finely sculpted head of a man in stone over the south door, dating from before 1150.

The church's unique and beautiful baptismal font, in the High Gothic style from the Middle Ages. Olavskilden, a fountain associated with St. Olav the Holy. The Terje Vigen stone monument in memory of the brave men of the 1807–1814 war. The stone monument was erected in 1906 by the friends of Terje Vigen. The altarpiece, pulpit with paneled ceiling and pews with the names of farms painted on them are considered valuable. They were made during the period from 1500–1700. The well-preserved church is located approximately 3 kilometres (1.9 mi) north of the town of Grimstad.

== See also ==
- List of former municipalities of Norway
