= Karl Ugland =

Norwegian politician (1886–1966)

Karl Ugland (18 January 1886 - 10 August 1966) was a Norwegian politician for the Liberal Party.

He served as a deputy representative to the Norwegian Parliament from Aust-Agder during the term 1950–1953.
