= Grimstad (town) =

Town in Agder, Norway

- Town/City
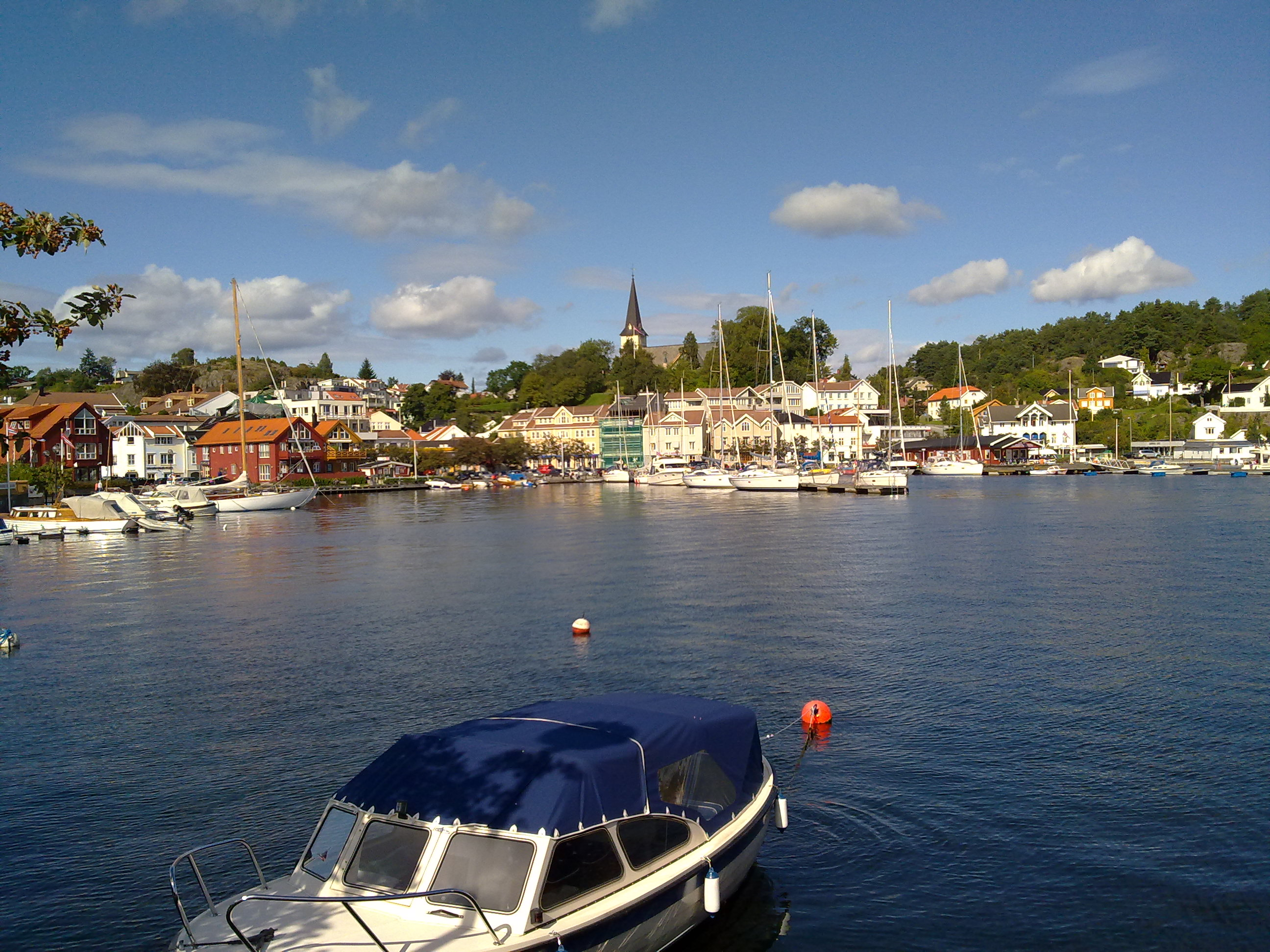
- View of the town harbour
- Interactive map of Grimstad
- Coordinates: 58.3405°N 08.5934°E
- Country: Norway
- Region: Southern Norway
- County: Agder
- District: Østre Agder
- Municipality: Grimstad Municipality
- Established as
- Ladested: 1622
- Kjøpstad: 1816

Area
  - Total: 10.86 km^{2} (4.19 sq mi)
- Elevation: 4 m (13 ft)

Population (2025)
  - Total: 15,196
  - Density: 1,399/km^{2} (3,620/sq mi)
- Time zone: UTC+01:00 (CET)
  - Summer (DST): UTC+02:00 (CEST)
- Post Code: 4876 Grimstad

Grimstad (pronounced [ˈɡrɪ̀mstɑ]) is a town in Grimstad Municipality in Agder county, Norway. The town is the administrative centre of the municipality. It is located on the Skagerrak coast in Southern Norway along the Groosefjorden, between the towns of Arendal (to the northeast) and Lillesand (to the southwest).

The 10.86-square-kilometre (2,680-acre) town has a population (2025) of 15,196 and a population density of 1,399 inhabitants per square kilometre (3,620/sq mi).

Grimstad Church is located on a small hill overlooking the town's harbour. The University of Agder is located in the town as well.

== History ==
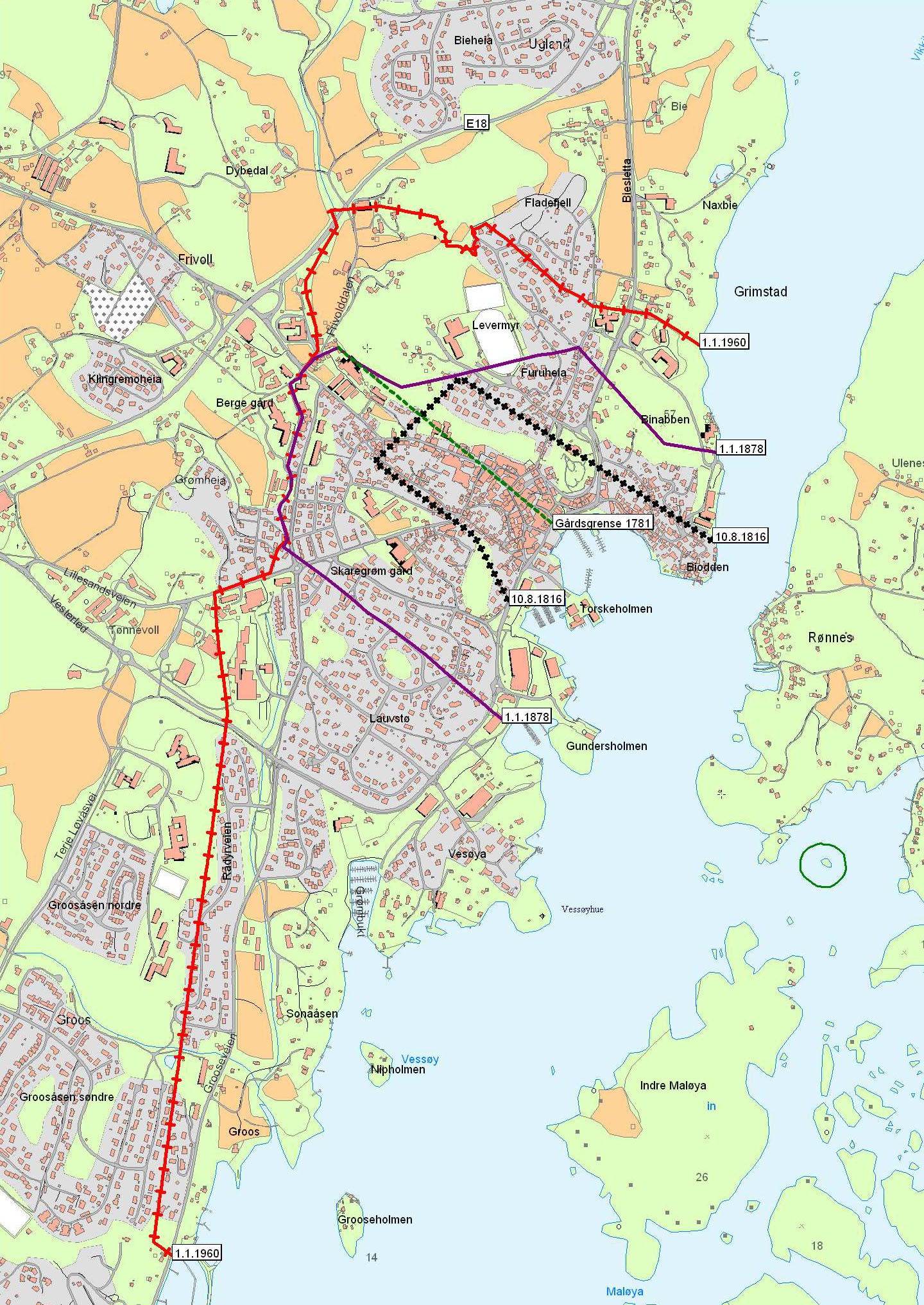
Map of the boundaries of the town of Grimstad over the years.

The village of Grømstad existed for a long time as part of the ancient prestegjeld of Fjære. It is reportedly first mentioned as a harbor in the 16th century. Eight years after he was deposed, King Christian II of Denmark–Norway (1513–1523) attempted to recover his kingdoms. A tempest scattered his fleet off the Norwegian coast, and on 24 October 1531, they took refuge at Grimstad. On 1 July 1532, he surrendered to his rival, King Frederick I of Denmark, in exchange for a promise of safe conduct. King Frederick failed to honor his promise and imprisoned Christian until he died.

An inn is recorded at Grimstad as early as 1607. In 1622, the village was granted ladested status under nearby Arendal due to its growing harbour and trading which gave it certain trading rights. By 1747, Grimstad was identified as a sailing community and a recognized haunt of smugglers. During the Napoleonic Wars, England blockaded Norway and in 1811, an English brig entered the harbor to capture blockade runners, but was vigorously repulsed and did not return.

John Frederik Classen, who owned the Frolands Værk (an ironworks located nearby), obtained concessions to export and import through Grimstad and bypass Arendal with its customs dues. Grimstad was awarded kjøpstad status in 1816.

The town of Grimstad was established as a municipality on 1 January 1838 (see formannskapsdistrikt law). On 1 January 1878, part of the neighboring Fjære Municipality (population: 948) was transferred to the town of Grimstad. Again, on 1 January 1960, another part of Fjære Municipality (pop: 344) was transferred to the town of Grimstad.

On 1 January 1971, the following areas were merged to form an enlarged Grimstad Municipality with a total population of 11,764:

- the town of Grimstad (population: 2,794)
- all of Fjære Municipality (population: 6,189)
- all of Landvik Municipality (population: 2,781)

=== Name ===
The town's name was originally Grømstad, when Norway belonged to the Danish kingdom. The name was misunderstood and became Grimstad during the registration of Norwegian cities and small places. The site of the town was originally the port (Old Norse: stoð) of the old Grøm farm. The exact meaning of the name Grøm is uncertain, but it is derived from a river name Gró or Gróa which means "the growing one".

== Government ==
In Norway, municipalities are the unit of local government. This means that cities and towns are simply designations for urban areas, but under current Norwegian law, they have no actual government authority. The town of Grimstad lies within Grimstad Municipality and is therefore governed by the municipal council of Grimstad Municipality.

== Climate ==
Climate data for Landvik 1991–2020 (6 m, average highs/lows 1998-2025, extremes 1957–2020)
Month	Jan	Feb	Mar	Apr	May	Jun	Jul	Aug	Sep	Oct	Nov	Dec	Year
Record high °C (°F)	12.8 (55.0)	18.7 (65.7)	23.1 (73.6)	24.2 (75.6)	27.7 (81.9)	31.2 (88.2)	30.8 (87.4)	32.2 (90.0)	27.3 (81.1)	21.9 (71.4)	16.8 (62.2)	13.8 (56.8)	32.2 (90.0)
Mean daily maximum °C (°F)	3.1 (37.6)	3.9 (39.0)	6.9 (44.4)	11.1 (52.0)	16 (61)	19.8 (67.6)	21.6 (70.9)	20.5 (68.9)	17.2 (63.0)	11.8 (53.2)	7.2 (45.0)	4.1 (39.4)	11.9 (53.5)
Daily mean °C (°F)	0.1 (32.2)	0.1 (32.2)	2.4 (36.3)	6.4 (43.5)	11.2 (52.2)	14.8 (58.6)	16.9 (62.4)	16.1 (61.0)	12.7 (54.9)	8 (46)	4.2 (39.6)	1.2 (34.2)	7.8 (46.1)
Mean daily minimum °C (°F)	−3 (27)	−2.6 (27.3)	−1.1 (30.0)	2.3 (36.1)	6.4 (43.5)	10.3 (50.5)	12.5 (54.5)	11.8 (53.2)	9.5 (49.1)	4.8 (40.6)	1.5 (34.7)	−1.9 (28.6)	4.2 (39.6)
Record low °C (°F)	−27.5 (−17.5)	−30.3 (−22.5)	−23.2 (−9.8)	−11.6 (11.1)	−2.6 (27.3)	0 (32)	3.5 (38.3)	3.5 (38.3)	−0.8 (30.6)	−8.1 (17.4)	−23.1 (−9.6)	−24 (−11)	−30.3 (−22.5)
Average precipitation mm (inches)	144.6 (5.69)	97 (3.8)	91.5 (3.60)	69.1 (2.72)	80.5 (3.17)	88.4 (3.48)	89.2 (3.51)	125.8 (4.95)	137.9 (5.43)	175.1 (6.89)	169.6 (6.68)	147.4 (5.80)	1,416.1 (55.72)
Average precipitation days (≥ 1.0 mm)	24	21	19	17	14	16	13	14	14	20	21	21	214
Source 1: NOAA
Source 2: eklima/met.no database

== Media gallery ==
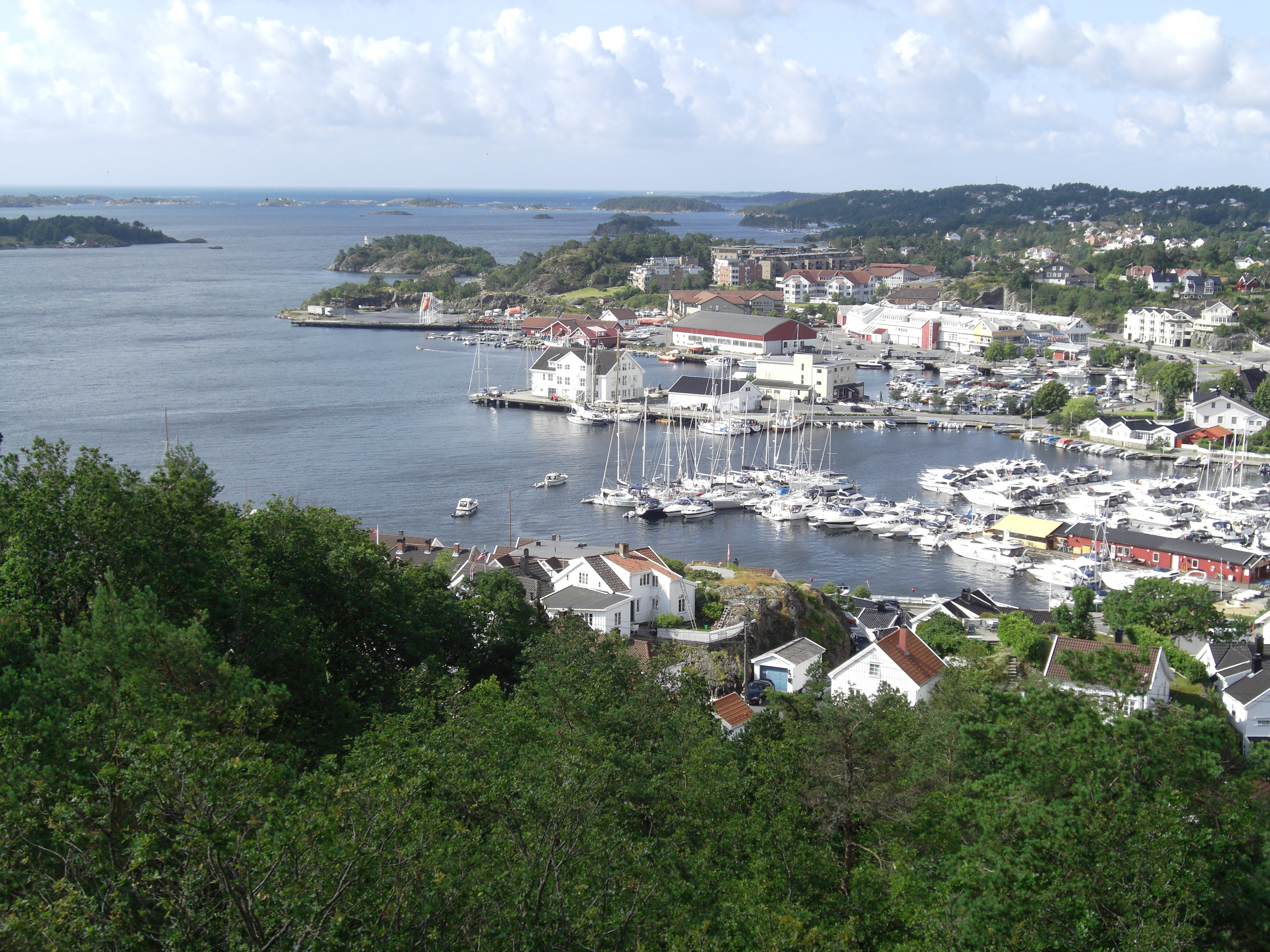
View of the harbour.

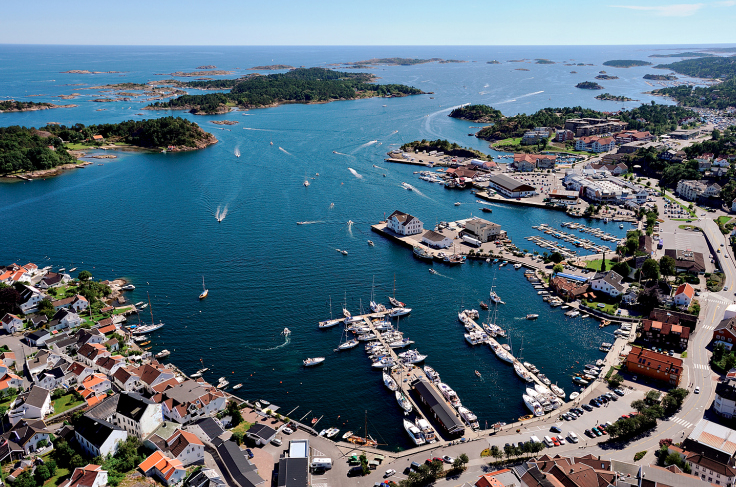
Another view of the harbour.

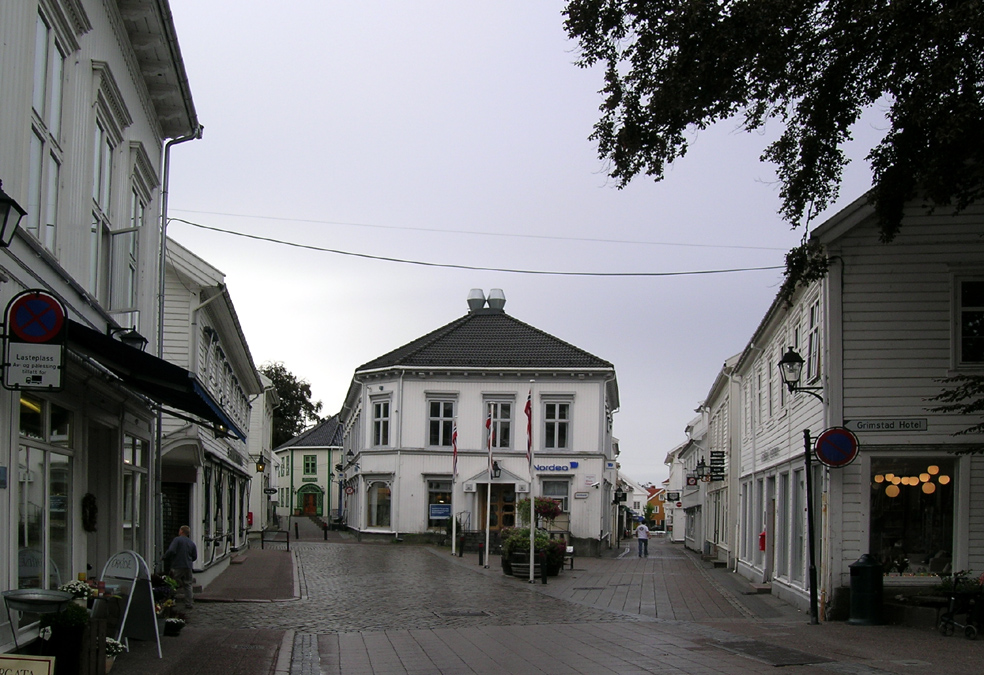
Town centre

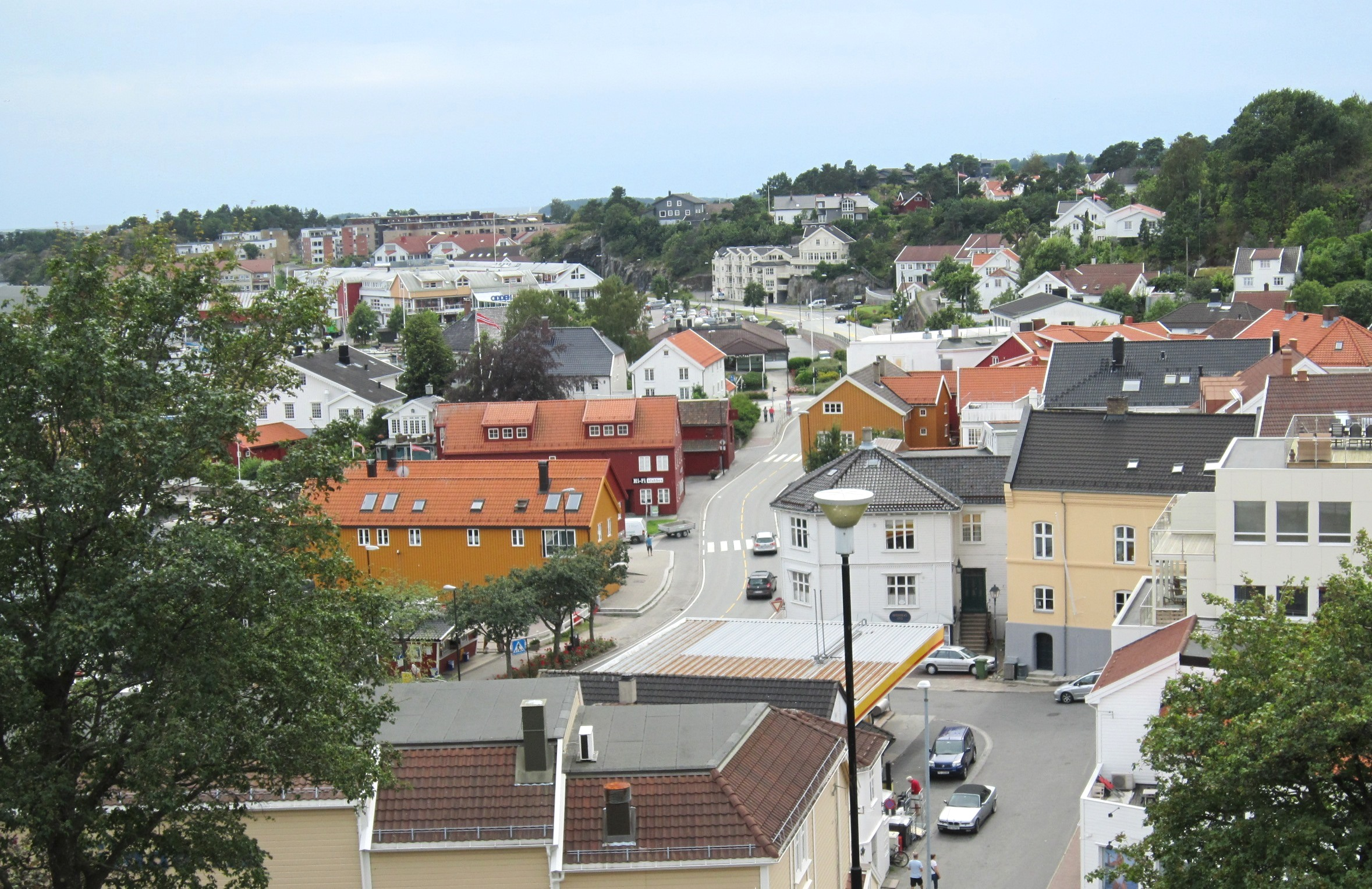
Overview of the town.

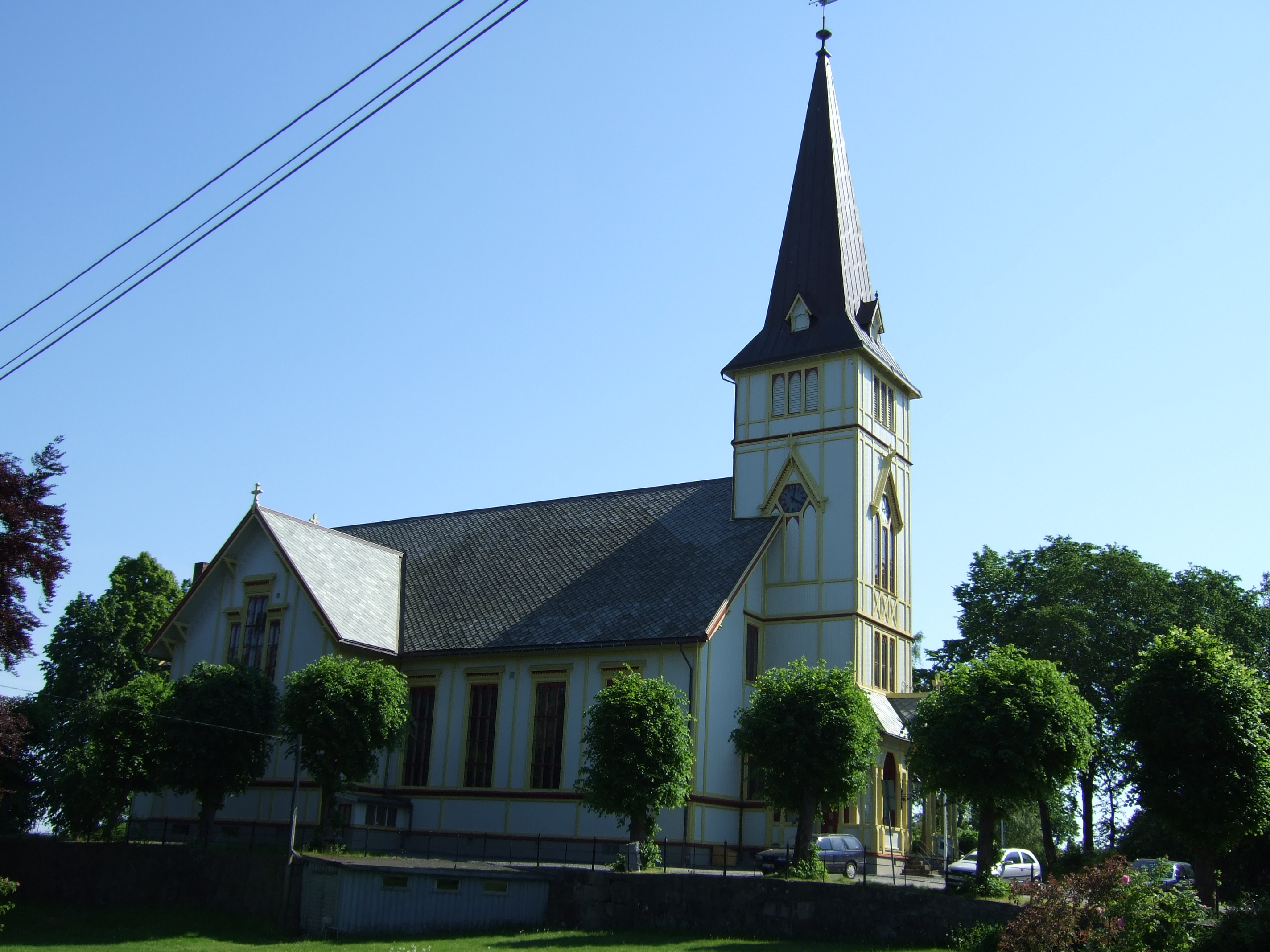
Grimstad Church

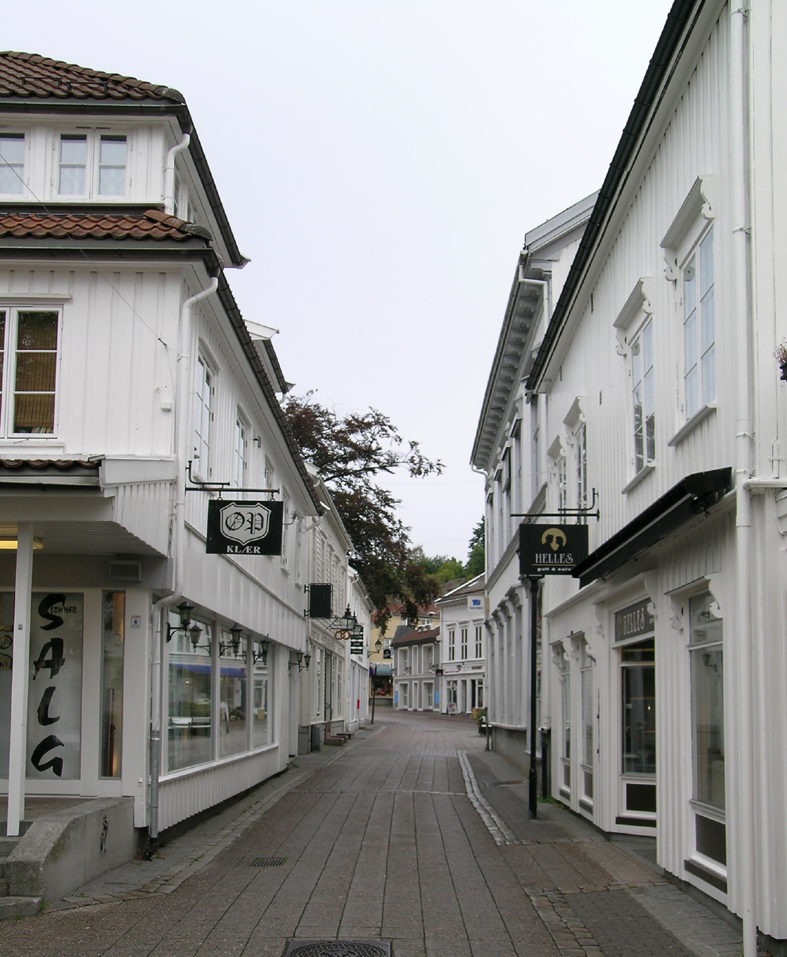
Storgata road in Grimstad.

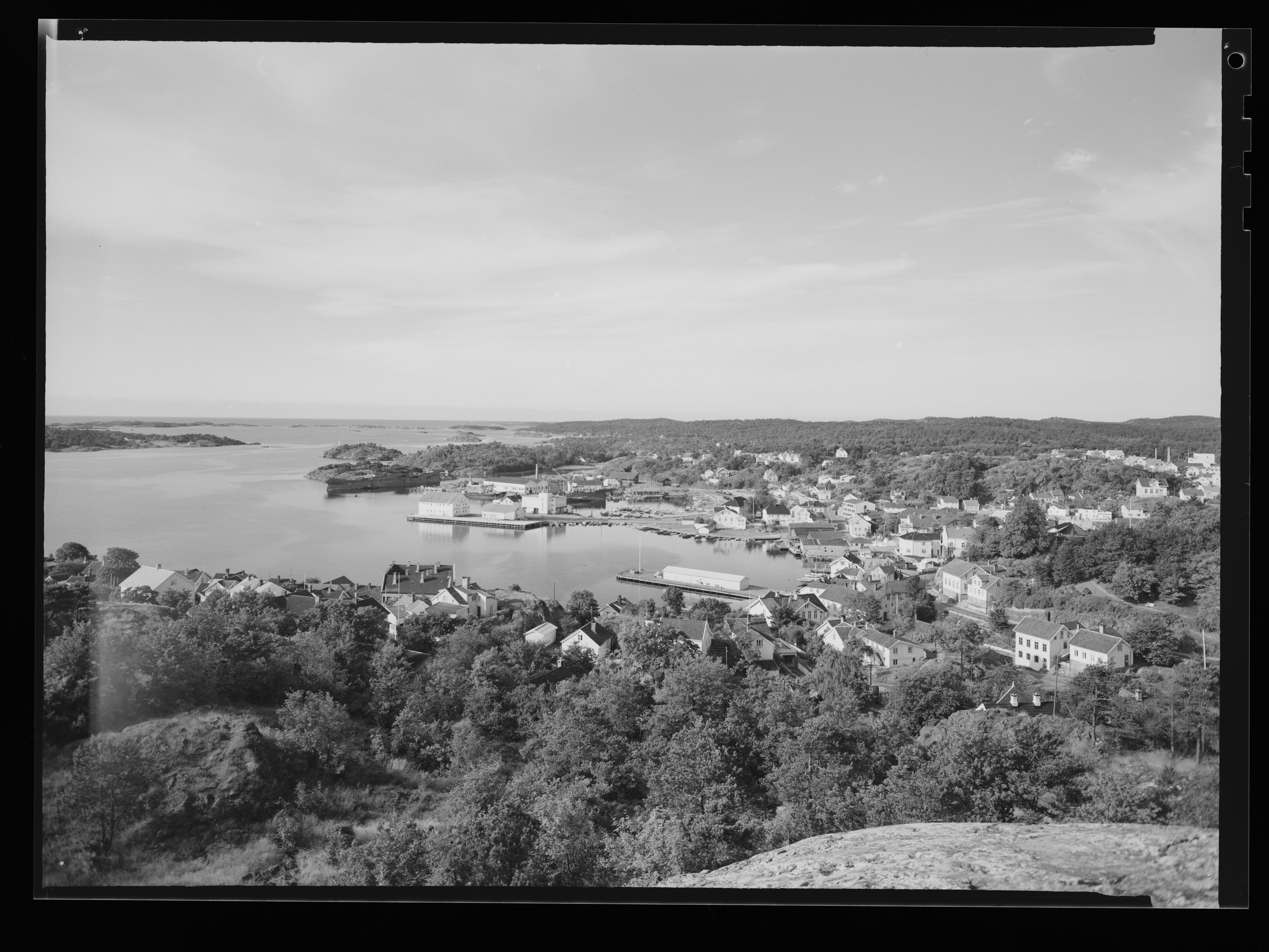
View of Grimstad before 1957.

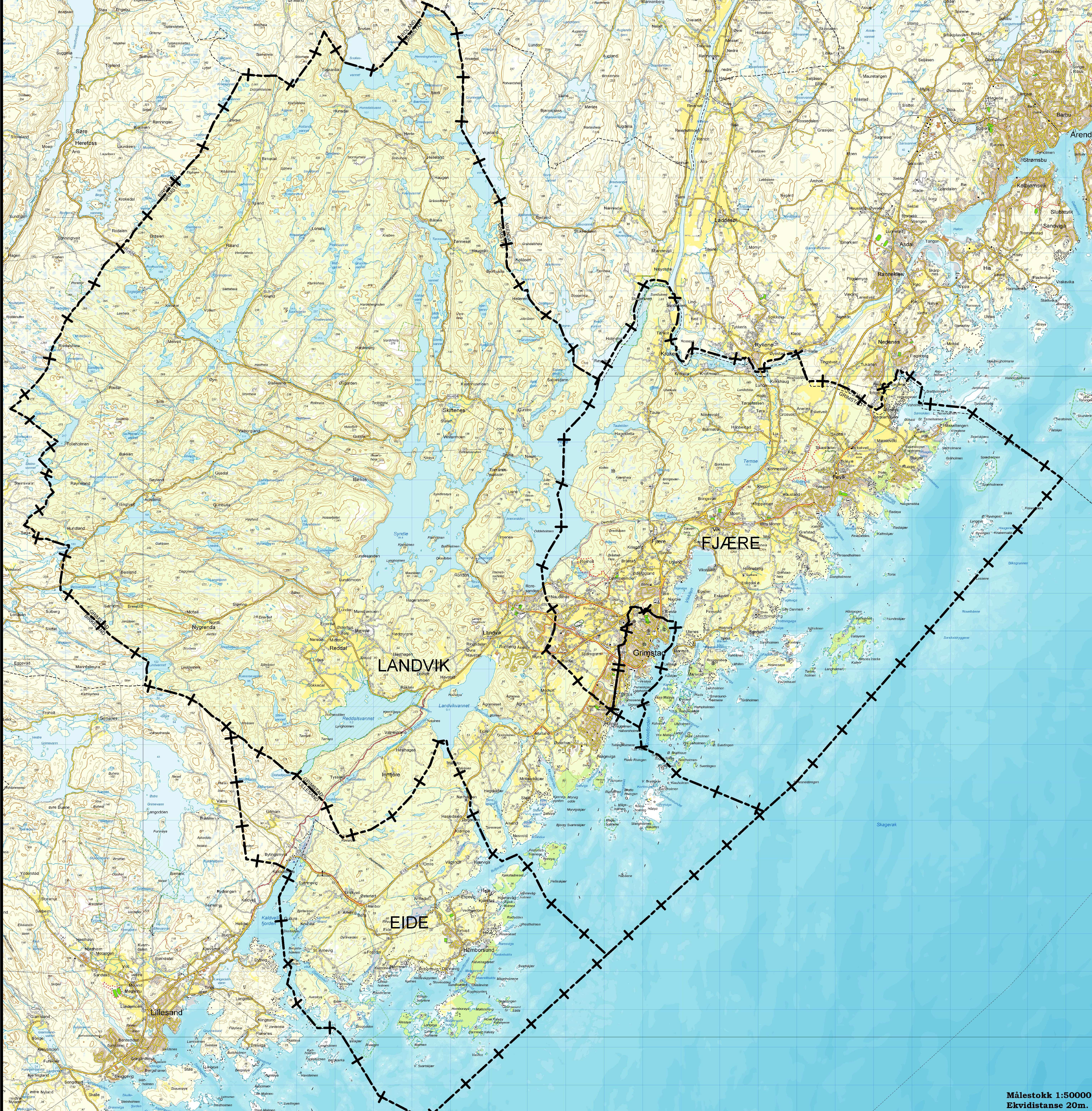
Expansion of Grimstad in 1971: Landvik, Fjære, Eide, and the town of Grimstad were all merged.

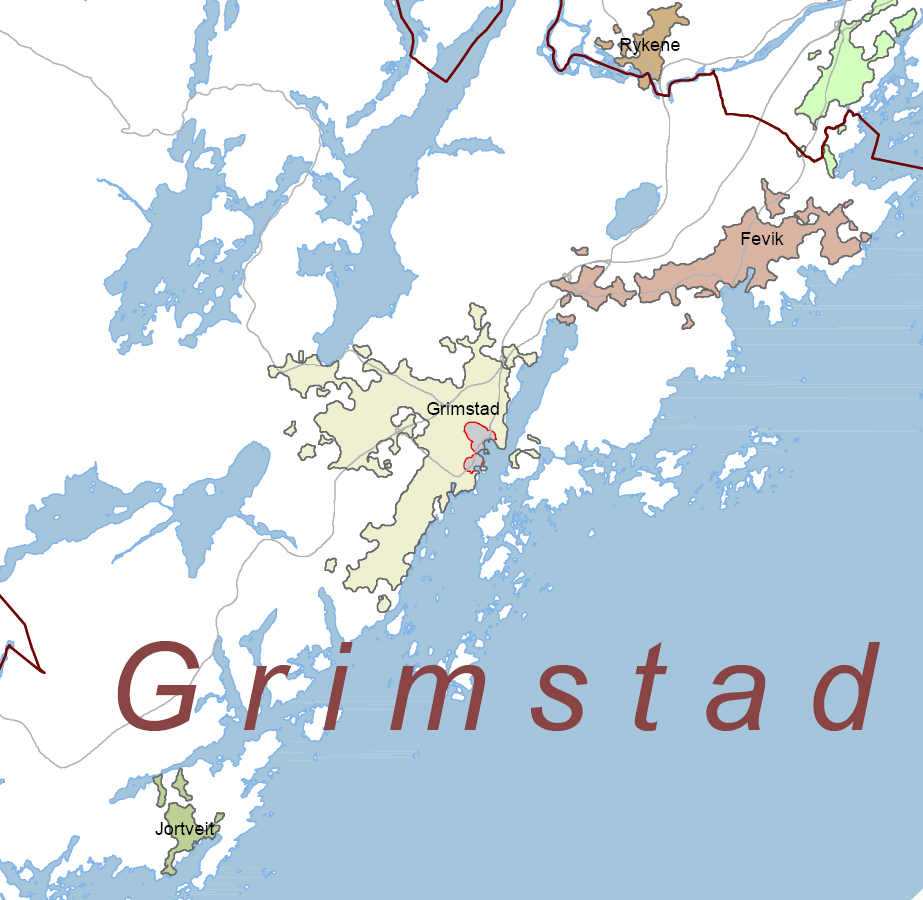
2005 map of the "urban area" of Grimstad.

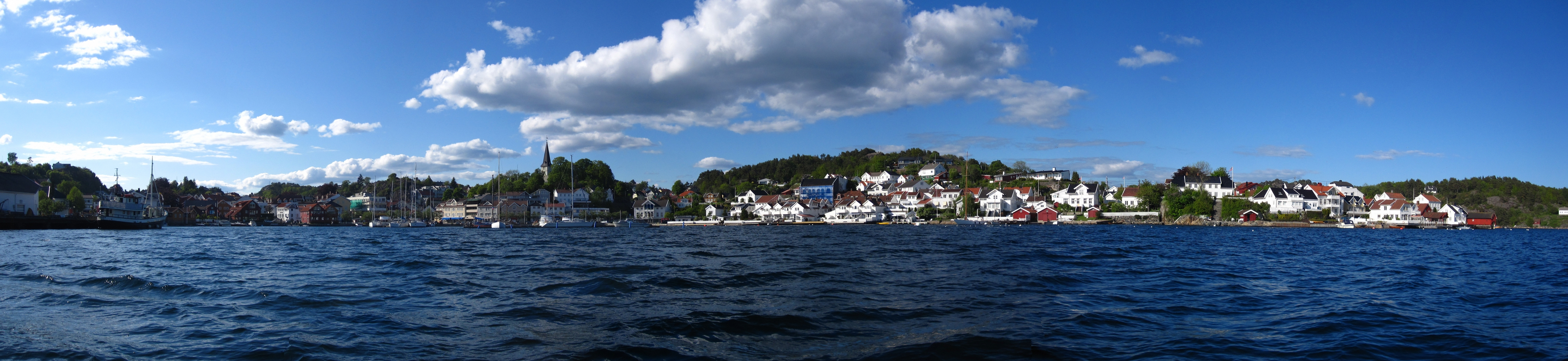
Panorama of Grimstad

== See also ==
- List of towns and cities in Norway
