= Fjære Church =

Church in Agder, Norway

- Fjære kirke
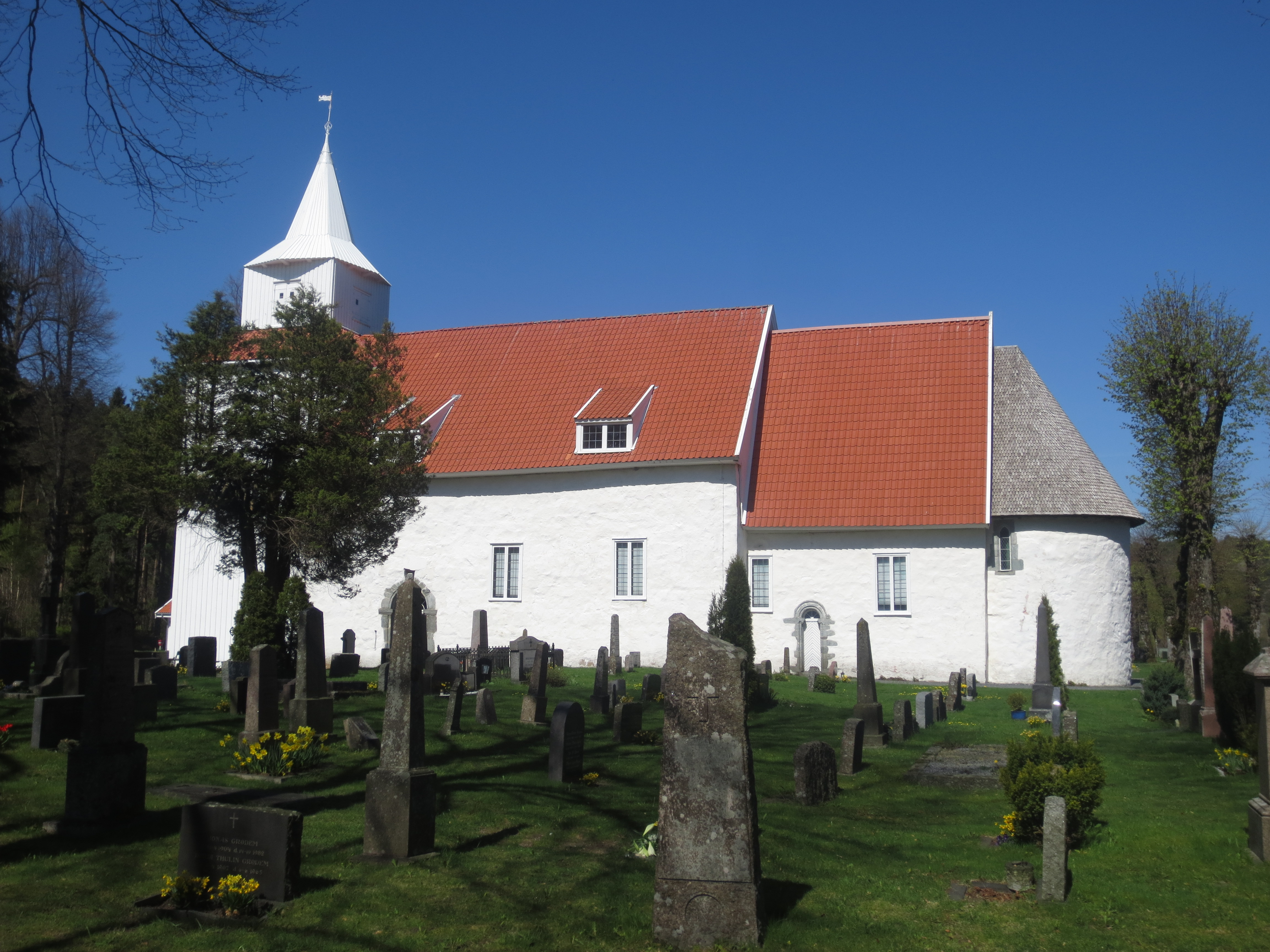
- View of the church
- Fjære Church
- 58.3662°N 08.5947°E
- Location: Grimstad Municipality, Agder
- Country: Norway
- Denomination: Church of Norway
- Previous denomination: Catholic Church
- Churchmanship: Evangelical Lutheran

History
- Status: Parish church
- Founded: Bef. 12th century
- Consecrated: c. 1150

Architecture
- Functional status: Active
- Architectural type: Long church
- Completed: c. 1150 (876 years ago)

Specifications
- Capacity: 300
- Materials: Stone

Administration
- Diocese: Agder og Telemark
- Deanery: Vest-Nedenes prosti
- Parish: Fjære
- Norwegian Cultural Heritage Site
- Type: Church
- Status: Automatically protected
- ID: 84152

Fjære Church (Norwegian: Fjære kirke) is a parish church of the Church of Norway in Grimstad Municipality in Agder county, Norway. It is located in the village of Fjære. It is the main church for the Fjære parish which is part of the Vest-Nedenes prosti (deanery) in the Diocese of Agder og Telemark. The white, stone church was built in a long church design around the year 1150 using plans drawn up by an unknown architect. The church seats about 300 people.

== History ==
The earliest existing historical records of the church date back to the year 1320, but the church was not new that year. The first church at Fjære was likely a wooden church with a stone altar. That church was taken down at some point and replaced with the present church, likely around the year 1150, but the old stone altar from the old church was left in place and a new stone church was constructed on the same site surrounding the existing altar. The new church had a 18-by-12-metre (59 ft × 39 ft) rectangular nave with an 8-by-10-metre (26 ft × 33 ft) rectangular choir on the east end. There was a semi-circular apse built on the eastern end of the choir as well. The church was constructed with a basement crypt underneath it. (The crypt contains 26 bodies, mainly important people from the community during the 17th century. The basement was formally closed to visitors in 1997 to give respect to the dead.)

The church was essentially the same from the early 1300s until the 1600s when changes were undertaken. First, the roof structure was changed, and the church got a flat ceiling and a new attic floor. Since then, the number of seats has been increased by adding balcony seating areas. During the 18th century, the apse had settlement damage, and the roof there was torn down and the apse was rebuilt along with a wooden sacristy on the east side of it. Around 1745 the gallery along the north wall was extended to the choir. In 1827, a large wooden tower was built on the west end of the building. In 1898, the west gallery was expanded to accommodate the organ. In the 1930s, plans were made to renovate and restore the old church. These got interrupted by the German invasion of Norway and the ensuing period of war. The restoration was finished during the 1950s and 1960s. When it was all finished, they had removed the old sacristy in the east and a larger sacristy was built on the north side of the nave. The foundations were all fixed to correct the sagging and skewed walls within the building. Frescoes were uncovered on the walls at this time as well.

On 29 October 2021, the church was broken into and vandalised. Amongst other things, the offender damaged some of the interior and the 12th- century baptismal font. He also entered into the 17th-century crypt and did damage to the church organ.

== Terje Vigen ==
The local poet and writer, Henrik Ibsen, wrote a poem about Terje Vigen in 1861. The poem talks about Fjære Church where Terje Vigen is buried. There is a large obelisk in the churchyard remembering Vigen and others who died during that war in 1807–1809.

== Media gallery ==
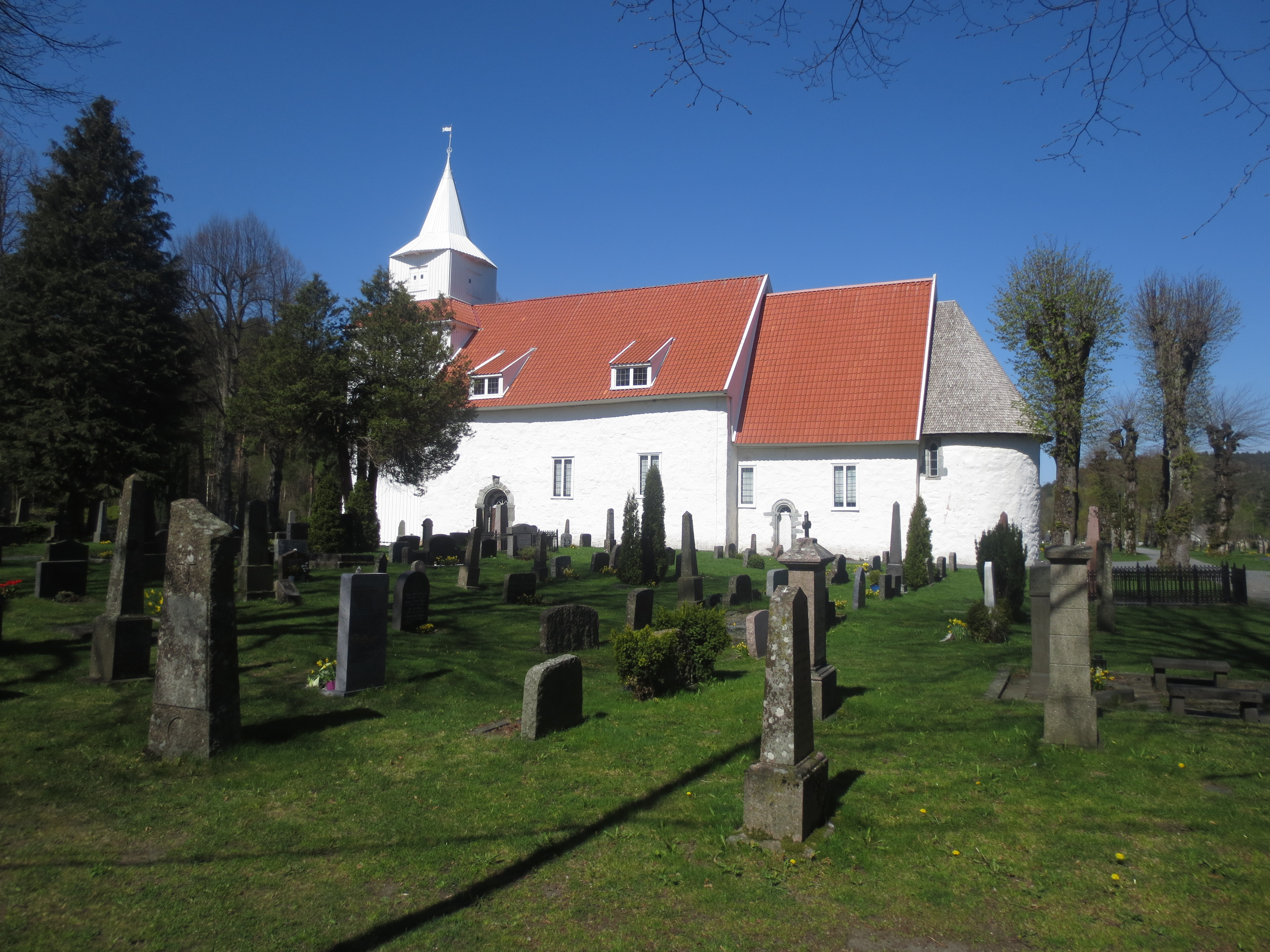
Exterior side view

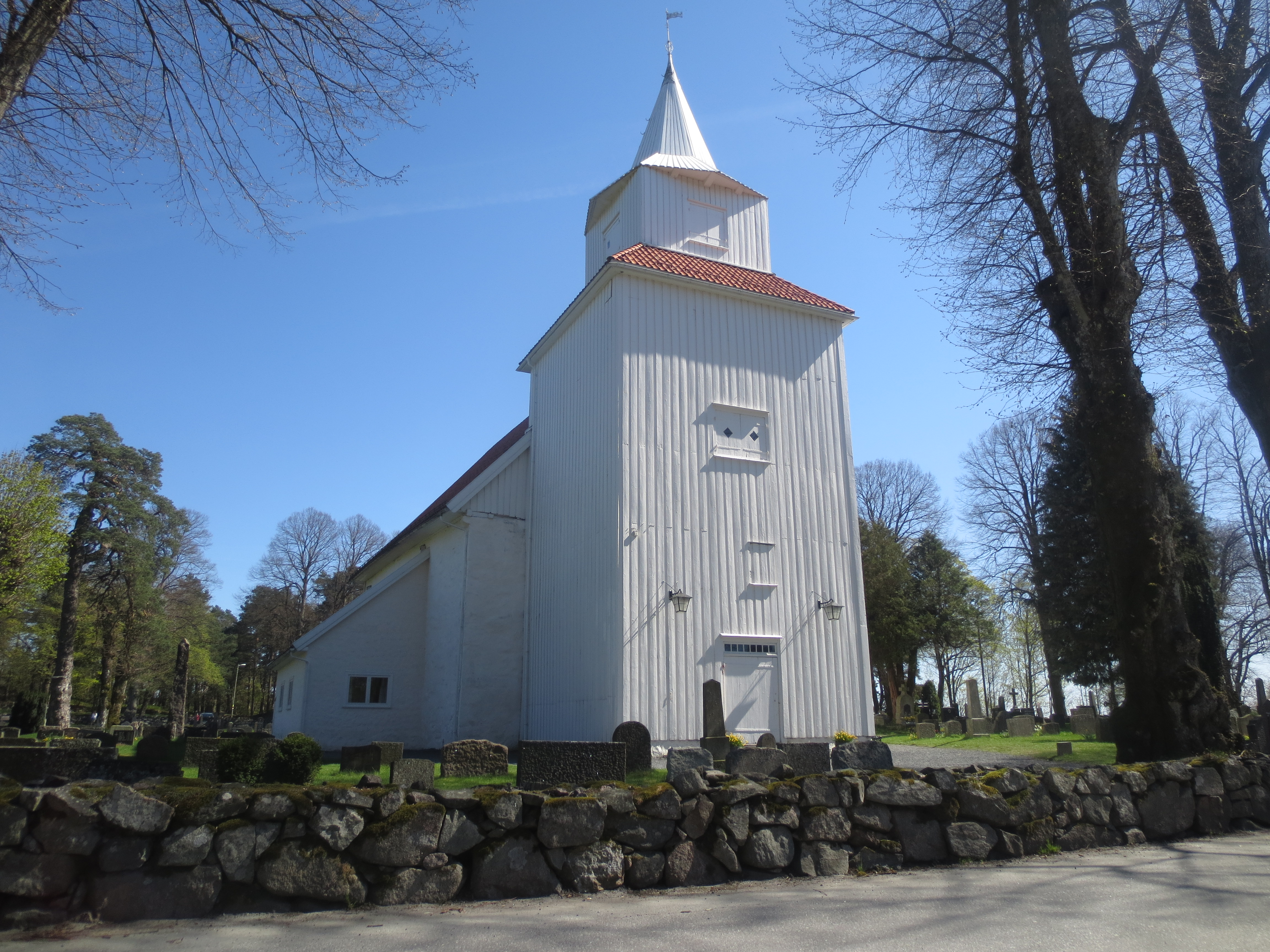
Front view

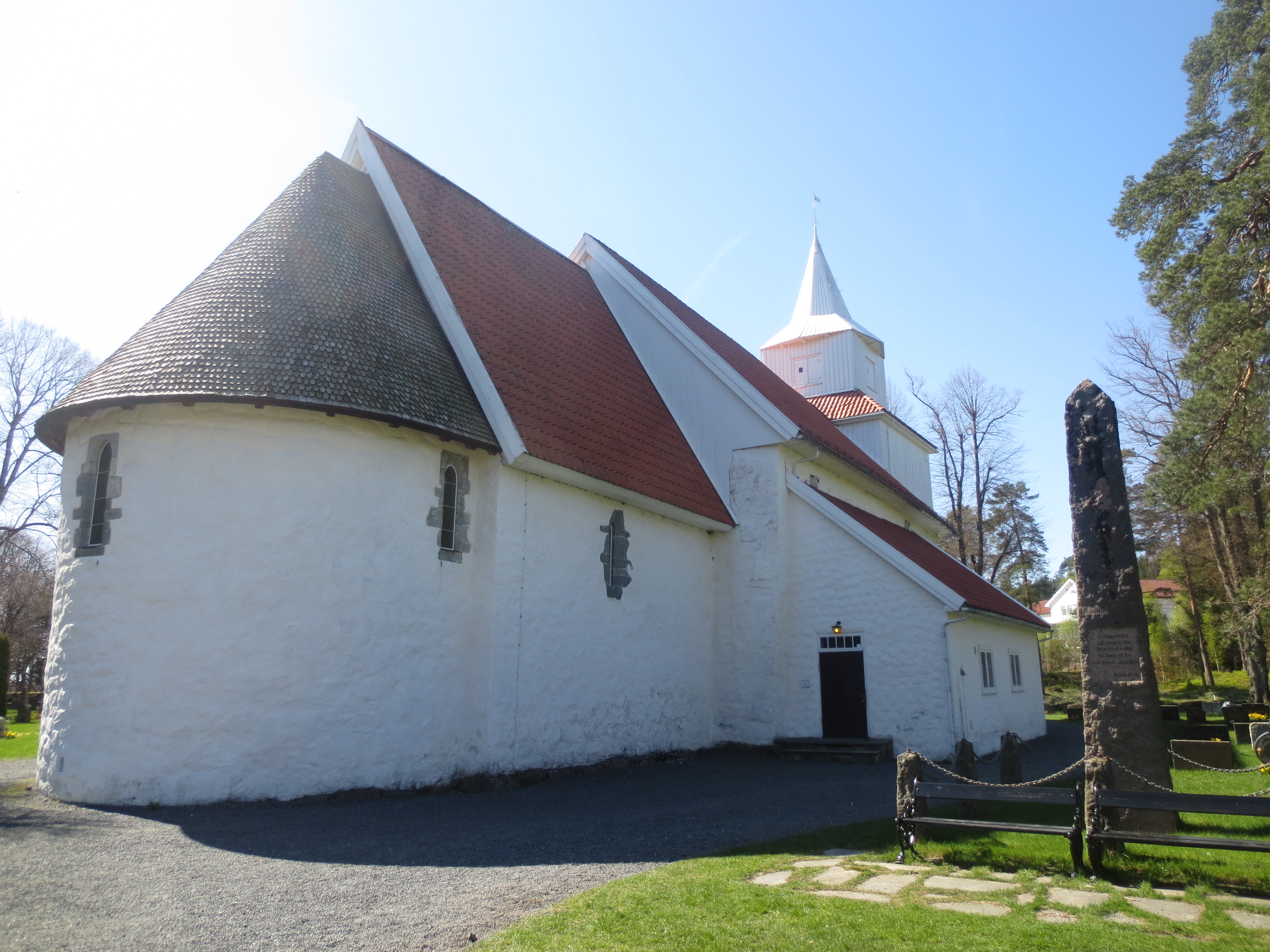
Rear view

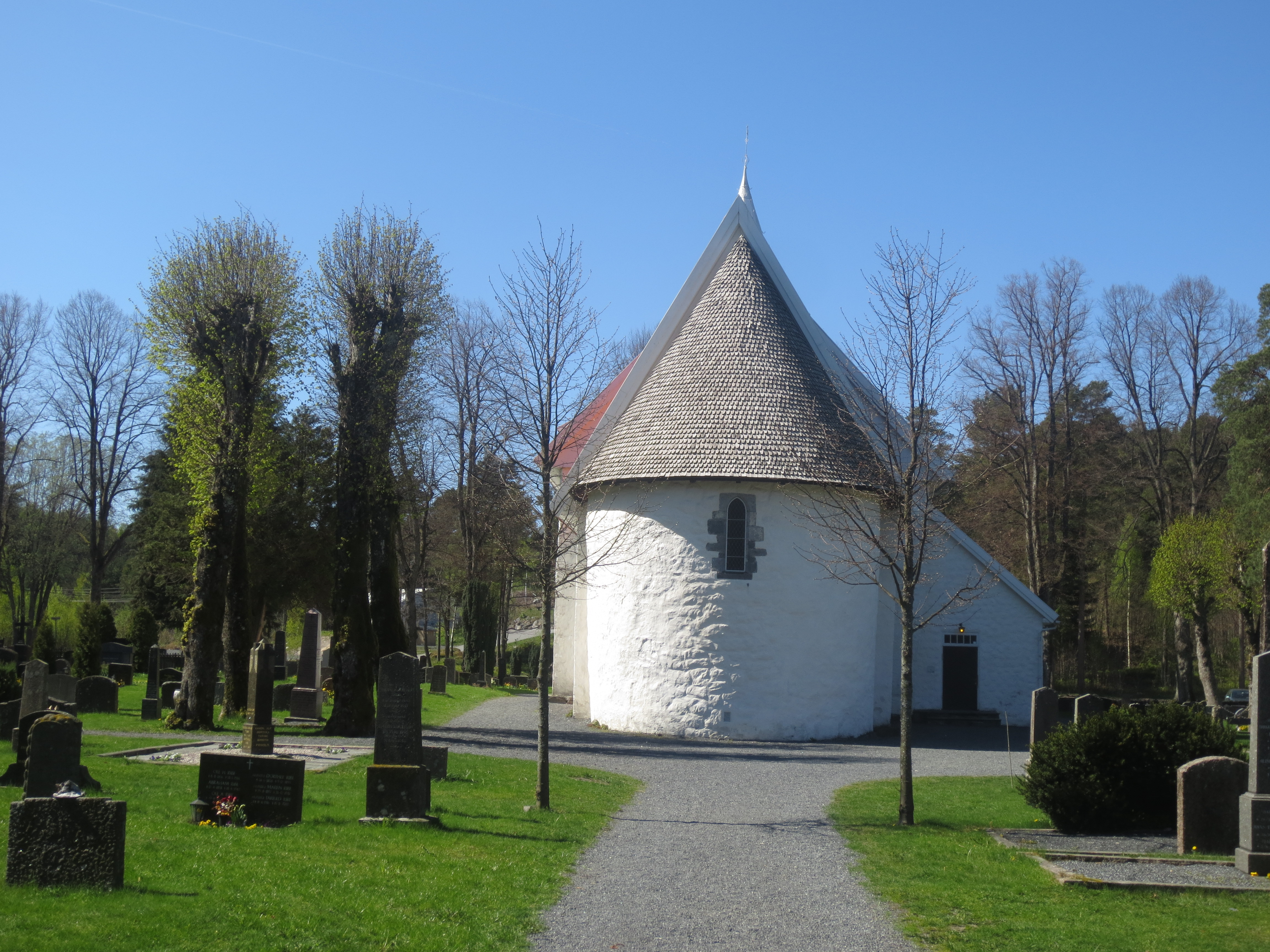
Rear view

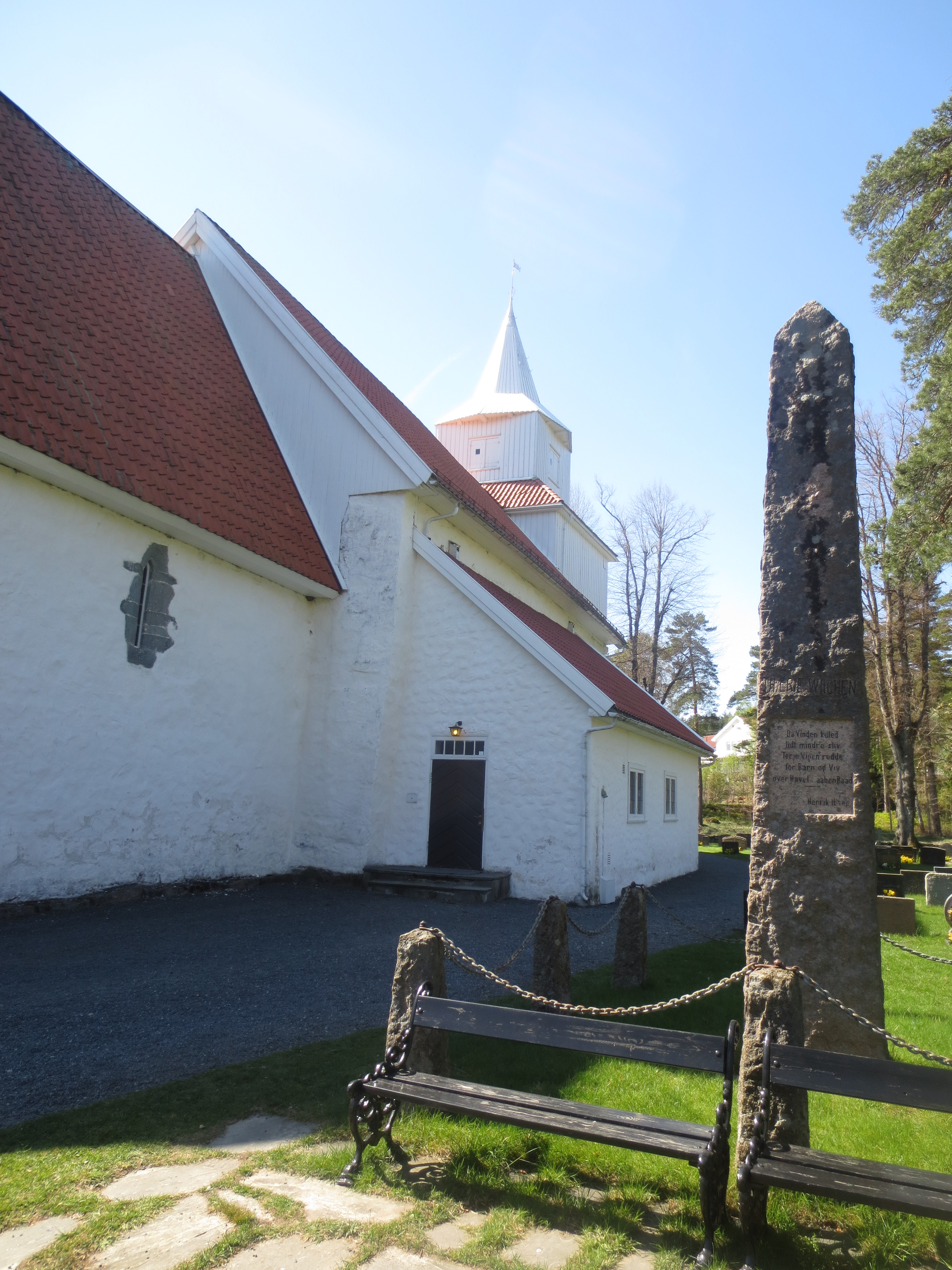
Obelisk remembering Terje Vigen and other war dead

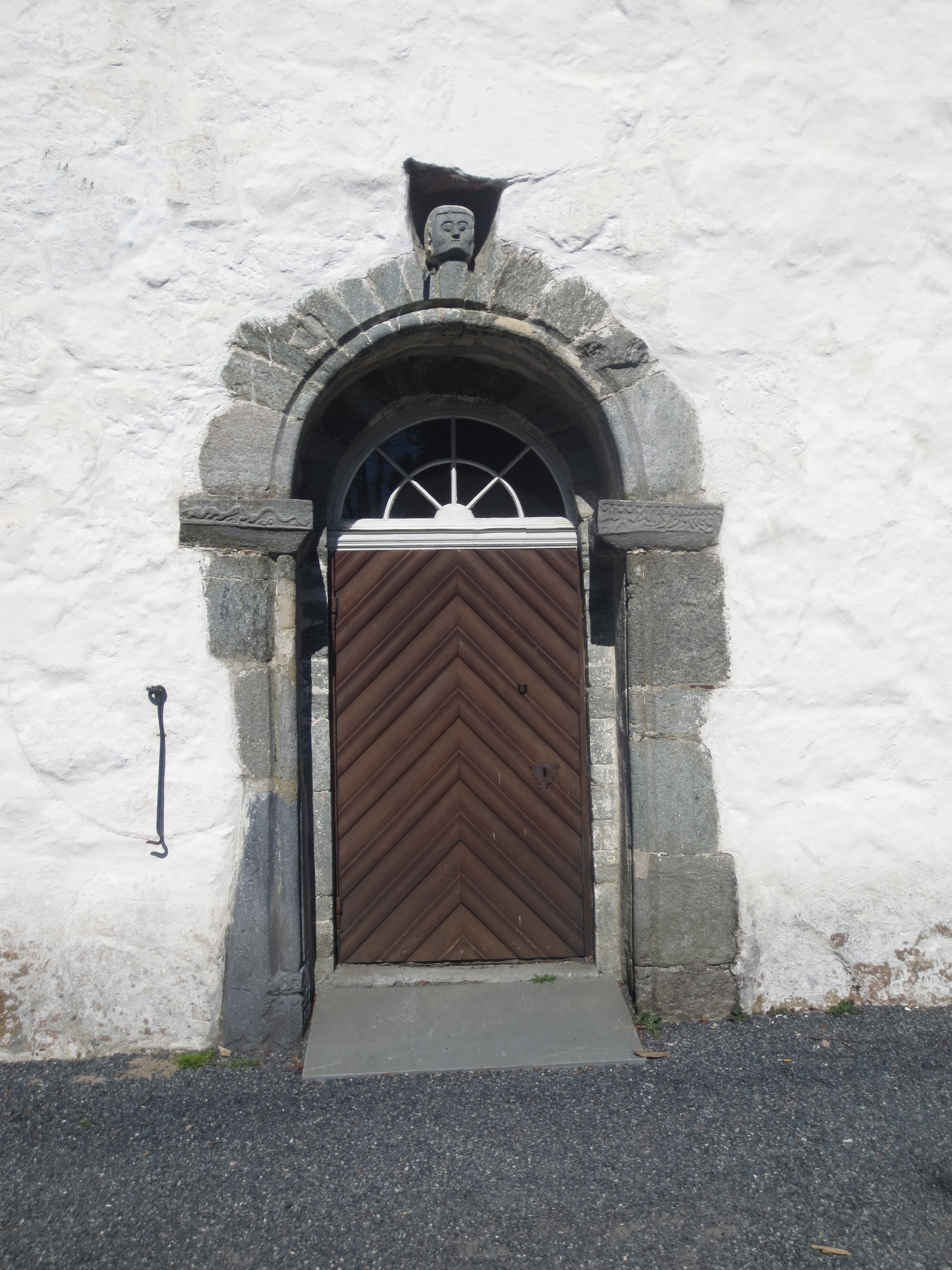
Side entrance

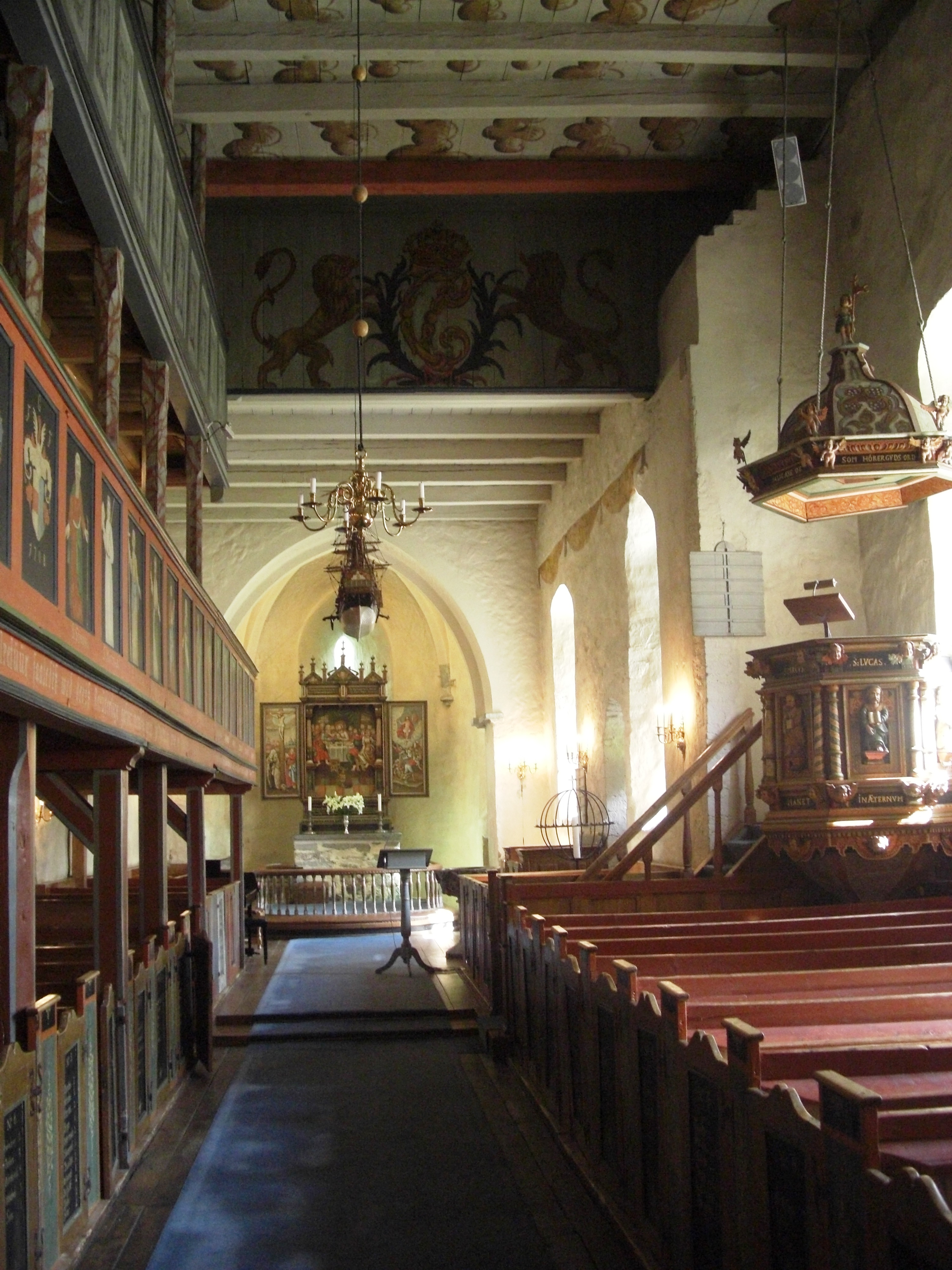
Interior view

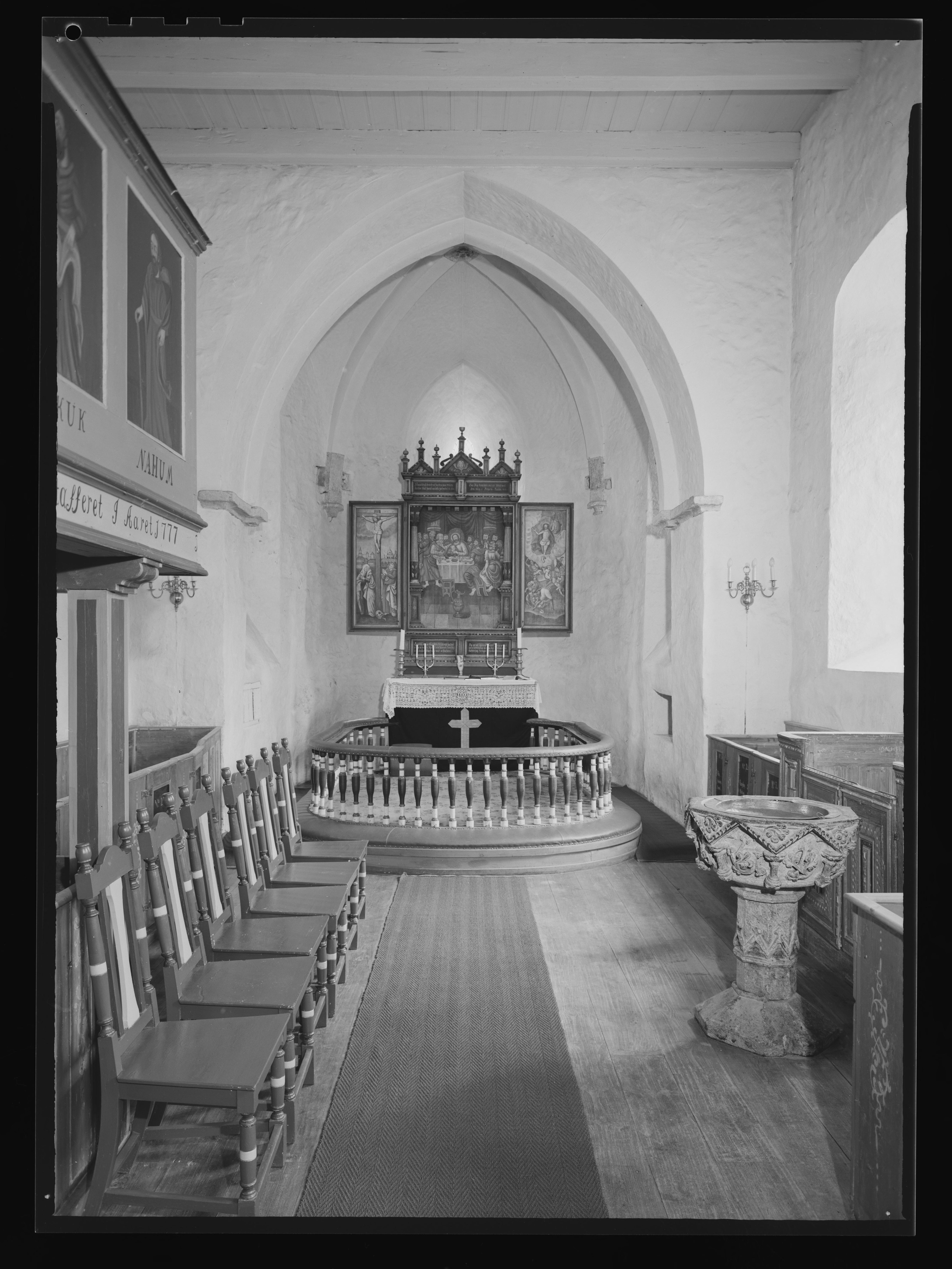
Looking towards the altar

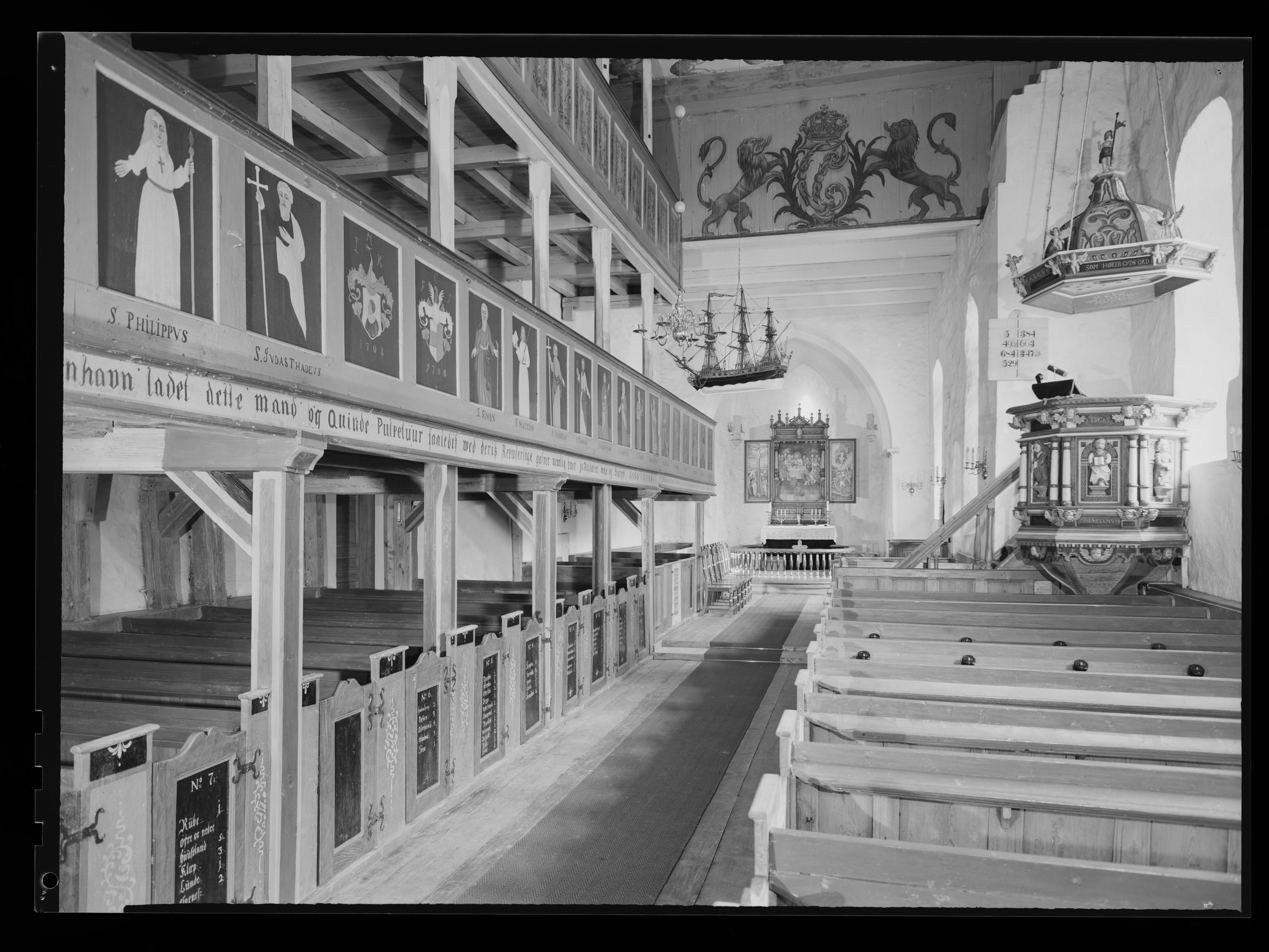
Balconies

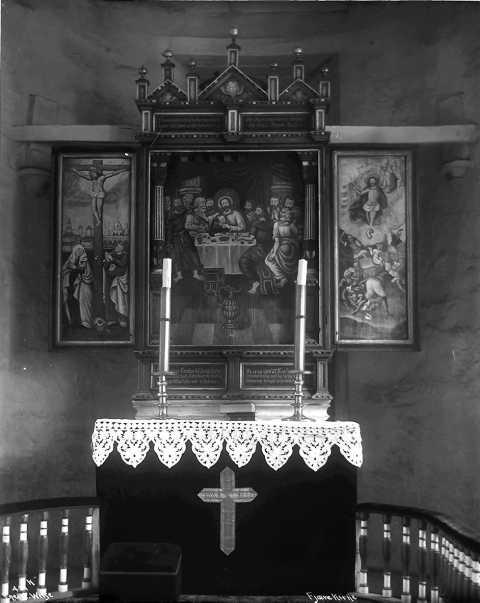
Altar

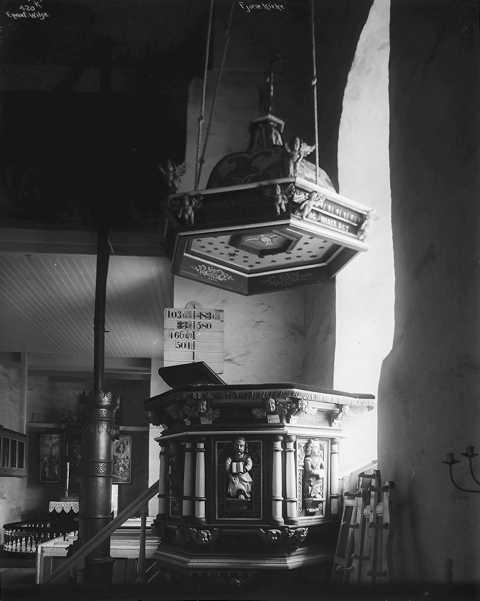
Pulpit

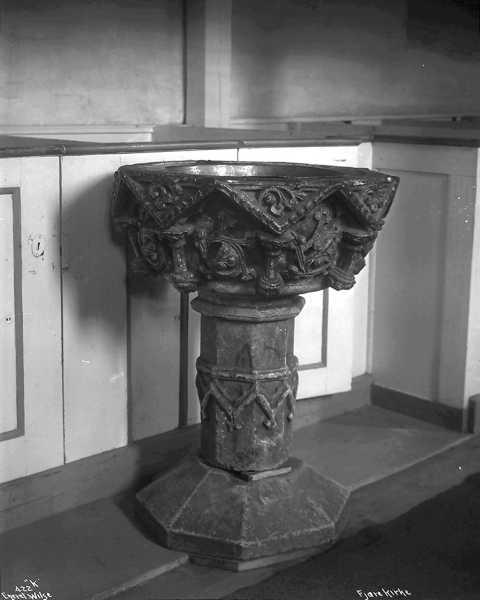
Baptismal font

== See also ==
- List of churches in Agder og Telemark
