= City of New York (1885 ship) =

Expedition ship

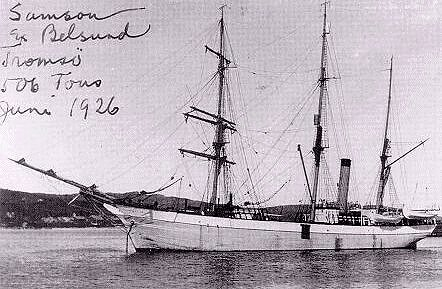
- As Samson (1926)

History

Norway
- Name: Samson
- Owner: Smith & Thommesen (1885–1895); Thommesen & Smith (1895–1896); Thommesen & Søn (1896–1907); O M Bugge (1907–1908); A/S Sælfangerdampskibet Samson (1908–1914)
- Operator: Smith & Thommesen (1885–1895); Thommesen & Smith (1895–1896); A Fosse (1907–1914)
- Port of registry: Arendal (1885–1907); Trondheim (1907–1914)
- Builder: K. Larsen in Logebergskaret, Arendal, Norway
- Laid down: March 1884
- Launched: 15 July 1885
- Commissioned: 19 February 1886
- Identification: Code Letters LFVB
- Fate: Sold 1914
- Notes: 170-foot steam barquentine

Canada
- Name: Jacobsen
- Owner: Canadian Whaling Co Ltd
- Operator: S. Th. Sverre
- Port of registry: Sydney
- Fate: Sold 1919

Sweden
- Name: Bellsund
- Owner: Svenska Kolfall A/B (1919–1922); Svenska Stenkola A/B (1922–1928)
- Port of registry: Stockholm
- Renamed: Samson (1928)
- Fate: Sold 1929

United States
- Name: Samson
- Owner: Richard E. Byrd
- Operator: Richard E. Byrd
- Port of registry: New York
- Out of service: 29 December 1952
- Renamed: City of New York (1928)
- Identification: United States Official Number 227902; Code Letters MGSH (1928–34)
- Fate: Destroyed by fire, 29 September 1952

General characteristics
- Tonnage: 506 GRT, 254 NRT
- Length: 147 ft 9 in (45.03 m)
- Beam: 31 ft 1 in (9.47 m)
- Depth of hold: 17 ft 1 in (5.21 m)
- Propulsion: Sail, Steam Auxiliary (1-Screw. C2cyl. 70NHP, later T3cyl. (18.1/2, 27.1/4 & 47 – 33in) 145NHP).
- Sail plan: Fully rigged
- Speed: 7 knots (13 km/h) (under steam)
- Armament: 1 × 3-pounder QF gun

City of New York was a steam barquentine which was Richard E. Byrd's flagship on his 1928–30 exploration of Antarctica. There were allegations that the ship failed to come to the aid of the Titanic in 1912. Her name was changed several times; originally named Samson (1885–1914), she was renamed the Jacobsen (1915–1919), and then the Belsund (1919–1926), and back to Samson (1926–1928), before being finally dubbed the City of New York in 1928.

== Description ==
As built, the ship was 147 feet 9 inches (45.03 m) long, with a beam of 31 feet 1 inch (9.47 m) and a depth of 17 feet 1 inch (5.21 m). She was rigged as a barque and had an auxiliary two-cylinder compound steam engine of 70nhp, 350ihp. The steam engine could propel her at 7 knots (13 km/h).

== Early career ==
She was built by Tjøstolv Bastian Larsen in Løgebergskåret, Arendal, Norway in 1885. Byrd tells us in error she and her boiler were built in 1882. The keel was laid in March 1884, the launching took place on 15 July 1885, and the construction certificate was dated 19 February 1886. Her port of registry was Trondheim and the Code Letters LFVB were allocated. Her Norwegian owner was Handelshuset Thommesen – Smith (T. Thommesen & Søn) who operated her as a sealing ship in arctic waters, with a crew of 45, and with 8 seal-hunt boats on board. Thommesen sold her to her new owner Auguste Fosse in 1908. Her port of registry was changed to Trondheim Her captain at that time was I. E. Samuelsen.

== Titanic ==
In 1912, the crew of the Samson were suspected of covering up their role in the sinking of the Titanic. In 1962, the BBC released a television documentary commemorating the 50th anniversary of the sinking, during which they publicised the deathbed statement of Henrik Bergethon Næss. Næss, who had been the first officer on the Samson in 1912 claimed to have seen mast lights and distress signals on the horizon in the vicinity of the Titanic's sinking during the night of 14 April 1912. It has been alleged that the Samson, which carried no wireless equipment, had approximately 3,000 pounds of illegally hunted frozen seal meat taken from Canadian waters in her hold, and fearing discovery from the coast guard or boarding by the Royal Navy, chose to ignore the Titanic's distress signals and steam away from the scene. It is possible that a ship with the Samson's capabilities could have rescued the majority of the 1,517 people who lost their lives aboard Titanic. This story would seem to corroborate testimony given by members of the crew of both the SS Californian and the Titanic of their sighting a mystery ship during the disaster.

However, doubt has been cast on this confession by some sources. Næss had actually made such claims in print before, in 1912, 1921, 1928 and again in 1939, with each version differing in some way. Although Næss was regarded as "a man of substance and credibility" in his native land, other crewmembers failed to corroborate his story. The Samson's captain, Carl Johann Ring, never passed comment on the story. He had died in the North Sea on 22 June 1918, the day after his ship, the Eglantine (built in 1866), was torpedoed by German submarine SM U-86. Despite having made it onto a liferaft with two other survivors of the sinking, Ring did not take the opportunity to confirm or deny the story as he lay dying of his injuries.

In the crew's defence, critics maintain that the sealer would not have operated anywhere near Cape Hatteras, as Næss initially claimed (although he may simply have made a mistake), since there are no seals there, and which is roughly a thousand miles from the Arctic waters which they inhabit. It has also not been explained why the crew of the Samson would be concerned about legal issues 500 miles off the coast of Newfoundland in international waters, or what they would have been doing so far out to sea.

Additionally, official Lloyd's and Icelandic records claim that the Samson docked in Isafjordur on 6 April and 20 April 1912, making it impossible for her to have encountered the Titanic given her speed. However, the records cannot prove the vessel was indeed there, and Washington Post researchers have discovered two eyewitness reports of the vessel's crew being involved in a drunken "spree" in the town "in May 1912 -- and not before." Nonetheless, it has been argued that the Samson simply doesn't match the vessel that witnesses on the Titanic reported seeing, and that it would have been impossible for the Samson to have been seen at a distance of 10 miles.

== Rescue of Ernest Shackleton ==
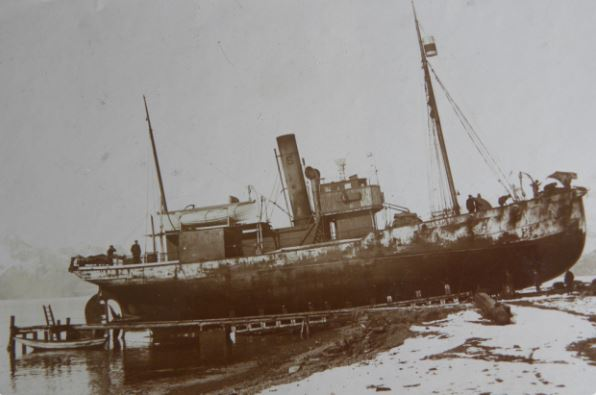
The other Samson a Norwegian steam-powered whale catcher

She is often mistakenly identified as being involved with the rescue of Ernest Shackleton, being confused with the coincidentally named Norwegian steam-powered whale catcher Samson. It was this other Norwegian Samson, based out of Montevideo, which rounded South Georgia in 1916, that retrieved Shackleton's beached whaleboat the James Caird, and rescued his men McNish, McCarthy, and Vincent.

== Later sealing career ==
From 1914 to 1919 she was owned by the Canadian Whaling Co Ltd and operated under the management of S. T. Sverne. She was named Jacobsen. Her port of registry was Sydney, Nova Scotia. In 1919 she was sold to AB Spetsbergens Svenska, the Swedish coalfield company and renamed Bellsund. Her port of registry was Stockholm. They used her until 1926 as a sealer supplying their holdings. The company operated her out of Sveagruvanin in Svalbard, and once their need for her services declined she lay for a period of time from 1927 to 1928 mothballed at anchor in Gothenburg. Spetsbergens Svenska were to sell her under her original name Samson as the Bellsund name had special significance for them. Throughout her ownership, she operated (the same cabotage) as a sealer.

== Ownership by Richard E. Byrd ==
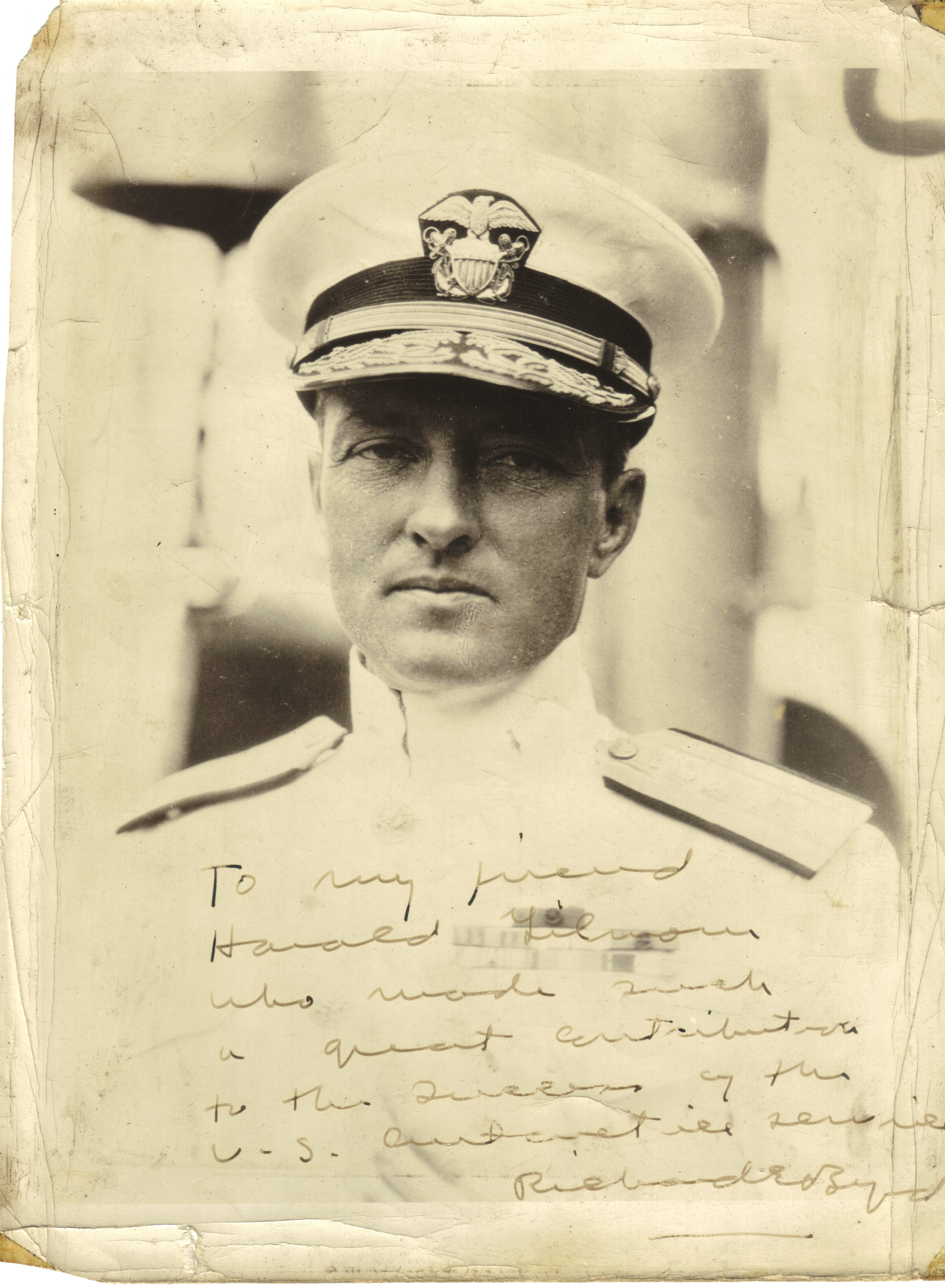
Rear Admiral Byrd shortly after the voyage

In 1928 the sealer was bought by Richard E. Byrd sight unseen from his office at the New York Biltmore Hotel by cable from Tromsø, in Norway, and he had her promptly sail for New York for any repairs, and making ready for his polar expedition. She was bought solely on the advice of Roald Amundsen.

She would make an unscheduled stop before tackling the North Atlantic at the Ananias Dekke drydock in Georgernes Verft, Bergen, in April 1928.

The Samson arrived in a dilapidated state, all her rigging had to be replaced, new sails made, a new boiler installed, and rotten planking in the hull replaced. The opportunity was taken to strengthen her hull. She was designed for the ice pack. Barque rigged, her timbers of the best quality, her hull was made of thick spruce and oak. According to Byrd, her oak ribs were "so thickly set amidships that a man could not thrust his hand between them". The ribs were sheathed with a layer of heavy planking both inside and out. On the outer sheath, another layer of greenheart was laid. Her top-sides were 34 inches (860 mm) thick, increasing to 41 inches (1.0 m) near the keel. Being small, the Samson had limited cargo space and could not carry the three aircraft Byrd intended to take with him to the pole. This meant he had to also buy the Chelsea, which he renamed the Eleanor Bolling. Purchase of the Chelsea was not without risk as no iron hull had ever been tested in the conditions prevalent at the south pole. In event of a disaster, the Samson would be the only means to safety for the expedition.

Byrd had arranged for repairs to be undertaken at the Todd Shipyard. William H. Todd had agreed for the work to be done at cost, and the repairs were done under the supervision of Captain Gustav Brown, the master of the "Bolling". She would ultimately be captained by Frederick C. Melville, after whom Melville Point is named. The ship, was almost entirely refitted, save for the ship's bell, wheel, binnacle, compass, and the auxiliary steam engine. The engine built in 1885 could still run, and funds had been exhausted, so it was felt the tiny engine would have to suffice. Her one great drawback was her small auxiliary steam engine, which was barely able to generate 200 horsepower. Byrd also recognized that "with advancing age, her carrying capacity had diminished considerably. Her dead-weight, for example, was greatly increased as a result of water soaking into the old hull." Byrd had her renamed as the City of New York and her original bell and wheel were engraved with the vessels new name. On completion of the refit, the ship was rated at 515 tons. Her length remained at 170 feet (52 m) and her beam was now 31 feet (9.4 m). Her port of registry was New York. The United States Official Number 227902 and Code Letters MGSH were allocated. The bill for the initial purchase of both ships, their refitting, strengthening the bow of the Bolling for the ice, and victualling came to $290,000. The bill for the City was $165,000. Had Byrd bought new, he would have required three times the funds.

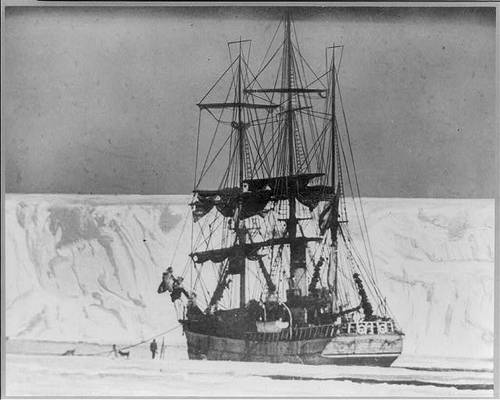
The City anchored in Antarctica, 1929

=== A Boy Scout ===
Byrd, in the spirit of Shackleton who took the Boy Scout James Marr with him on the Shackleton–Rowett Expedition in 1921, announced in 1927 that there would be a place made for a Boy Scout on the City. Of the thousands of applicants, the winner Paul Siple, an assistant Scoutmaster, turned out to have the added qualification of being a Sea Scout. Siple, who was 19, would spend much of the expedition working with penguins.

=== A stowaway ===
A teenager, the 17-year-old Billy Gawronski (1910–1981) swam the Hudson River to stow away on board but was caught. He was soon to make other attempts this time on the Bolling only to be caught again. However, as he was preparing a fourth attempt, Byrd gave in, and invited him onto the expedition, joining and sailing shortly after his 18th birthday. He took over from the older Siple in the galley, and in the long term was given the job of catching penguins for Siple.

=== Setting sail ===
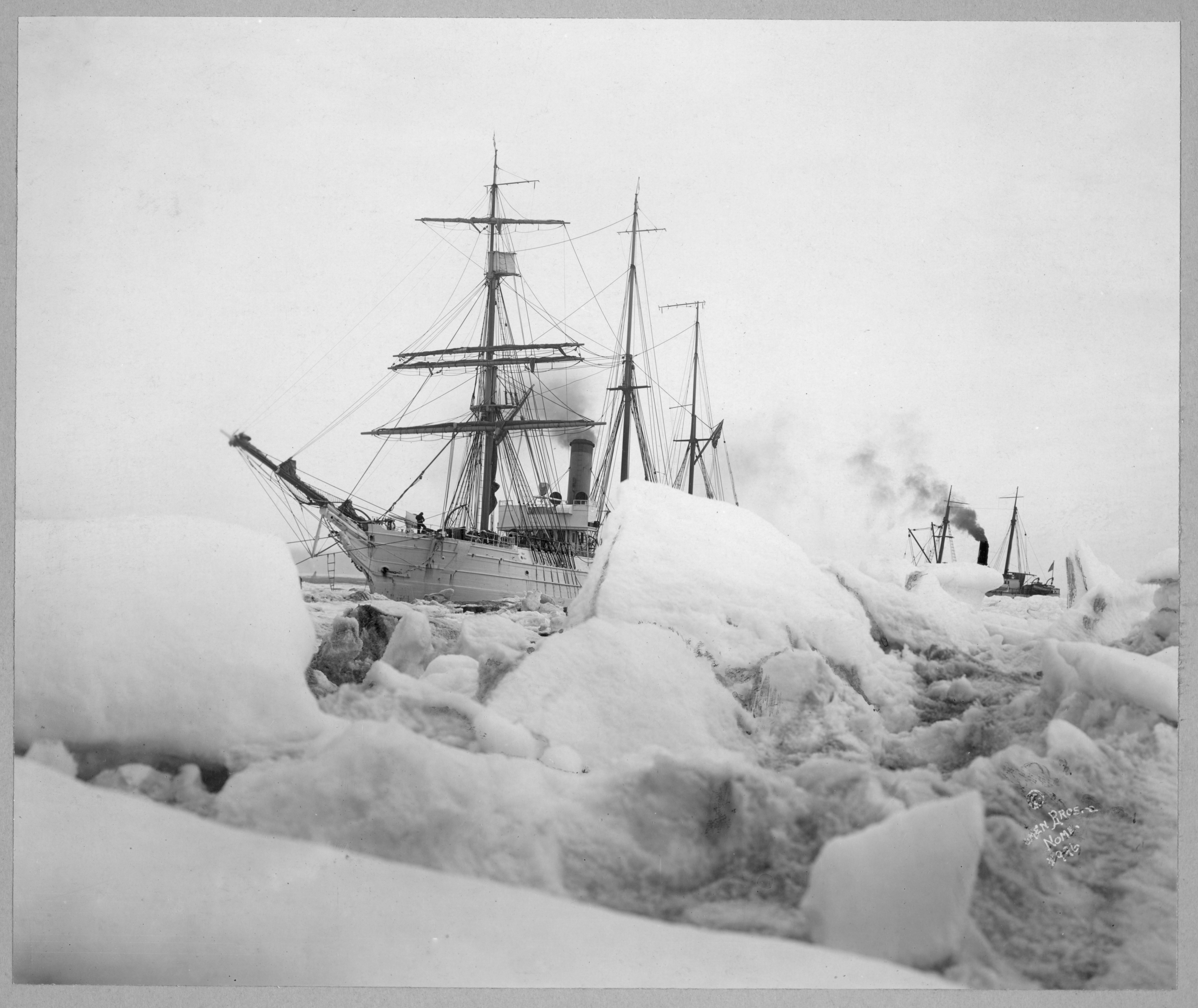
City of New York icebound, 1930

She set sail from Hoboken on 25 August 1928, for the Panama Canal, left Balboa, Panama on 6 October, and arrived at Dunedin, in New Zealand on 26 November. She was laden with a cargo of 200 tons of materials, and 33 crew. She was to take longer than the estimated 3 months to New Zealand.

The City and the Bolling arrived at the Ross Ice Shelf in December 1928.

The job now complete, both the City and the Bolling set sail for Dunedin, arriving on 10 March 1930. She broke down in the South Atlantic, and the Bolling had to tow her on occasion. The expedition arrived at New York on 18 June 1930. The expedition was a great success, and Byrd was honored with a ticker-tape parade and fame. Interest in his expedition was intense and the ship became a celebrity in her own right.

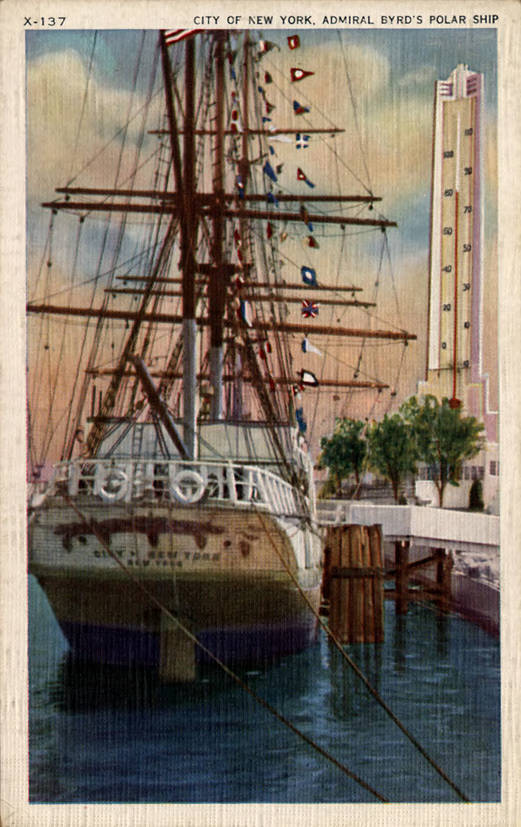
Admiral Byrd's Polar Ship City Of New York, at the Chicago 1933 Century Of Progress International Exposition

In New York, at the Potomac River dock, the ship was outfitted in 1931 as a floating museum of the expedition, complete with artefacts from the expedition, a very detailed model of the base camp "Little America" complete with radio antennae, and members of the crew remaining on board as guides. The exhibition included dogs and their kennels on the wharf front, an exhibit of protective clothing and boots. Tools, photographs, stuffed seals and penguins of the Antarctic. Visitors could snack on pemmican. A tour cost 50 cents for an adult and 10 cents for a child. She then went onto several other ports on the east coast.

In 1932, the City was sailed through the Great Lakes to Lake Michigan and the site of the Chicago World's Fair. She was berthed next to the 200 Ft. Havoline Thermometer in the South Lagoon on the lakefront opposite Northerly Island. She remained in Chicago for the exposition's full two-year run. On 2 October 1933, President Franklin D. Roosevelt came on board to view her. After the exposition she continued as in her role as a floating museum, operating in the Great Lakes.

=== Documentary ===
The ship appears in the documentary film With Byrd at the South Pole: The Story of Little America (1930), which won an oscar for Best Cinematography, at the 3rd Academy Awards, the first documentary to win any Oscar.

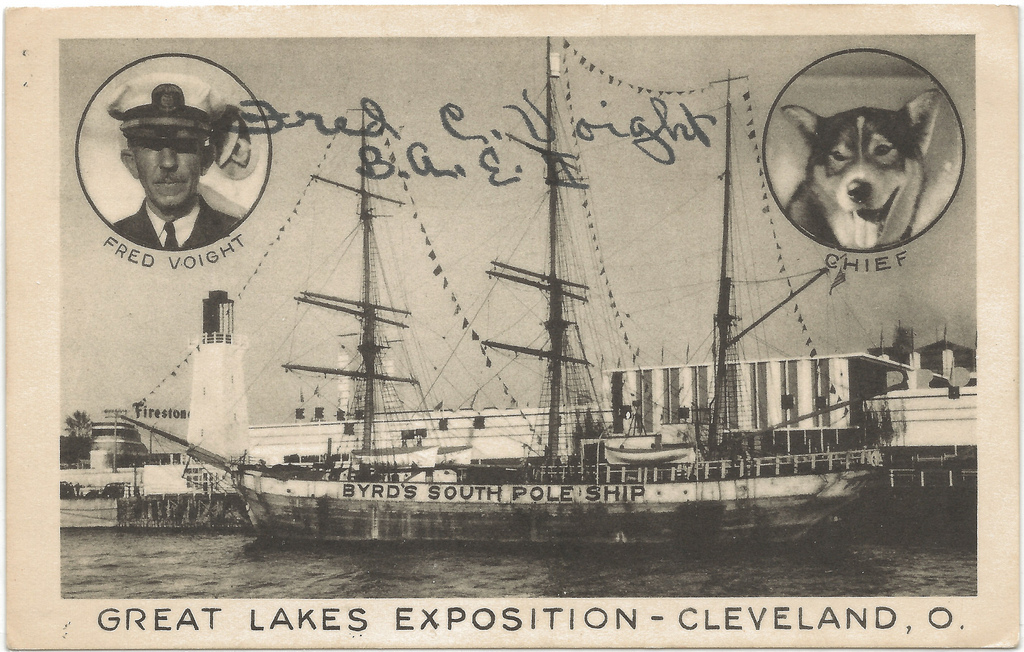
The City of New York, at the Great Lakes Exposition, Cleveland, Ohio in 1936. The crew members shown were from Byrd's second polar expedition

== Great Lakes Exposition, Cleveland, Ohio ==
She also appeared in Cleveland, Ohio for two years at the Great Lakes Exposition (World Fair of 1936–1937). The event was open in the summers of 1936 and 1937, situated on the Lake Erie shore north of downtown. She got trapped there for another five years due to a low-level bridge built after her arrival hemming her into the dock area. In Cleveland, a navigation bridge was added and the masts and bowsprit were cut leaving two jibs and ratchet.

Meanwhile, Byrd would go on with two subsequent polar expeditions, the second in 1934 where the City was replaced by the Bear of Oakland, and his third in 1939–1940 the latter being Byrd's first which had the official backing of the U.S. government.

In 1942, she was released and the City was assigned for wartime work on Canada's east coast. She was re-rigged as a 3-masted schooner. At the end of the war, she was in Nova Scotia, however by this time she was considered too slow and little used.

== Post-war life and Lou Kenedy ==
In 1944, when she was laid up as a hulk in Quebec, a well known yachtsman Captain Lou Kenedy (1910–1991), bought her, converting her into a three-masted schooner. During refitting, Kenedy discovered that the ship's wheel, binnacle, and bell were the originals from the Samson. At some point, these were removed and replaced: when selling the ship, Kenedy retained these original items. They would eventually be auctioned off along with a ceremonial bell-pull that had been used to ring President Franklin D. Roosevelt on board at the 1933 Chicago World's Fair.

Over the years the ship underwent several modifications. Kenedy immediately made her over into a schooner and sailed her under canvas for the first few years. When the money was found for it, a heavy diesel was installed, her topmasts were removed, and the bowsprit shortened. The more powerful engine exposed the drive shaft configuration to extra strain, and she would suffer from an ongoing problem of breaking shafts for the rest of her days. Kenedy mainly used her for freighting lumber from Nova Scotia to New England ports in the summer, and trading salt from the Turks and Caicos Islands in the winter. On occasion, he would make trips to Greenland; once chartered by the Royal Canadian Air Force. In the fall of 1951 the U. S. Government chartered her for providing dormitory accommodation on a building contract in North Greenland. In the spring of 1952, Kenedy agreed to take his children to the West Indies for an Easter vacation, and she took on a cargo of lumber to defray costs and set forth returning via the Turks for a loading of salt. Out on the sea, the shaft broke and the family had to tow her using the lifeboat and its small engine, to Lunenburg, Nova Scotia; it took 33 days. The shaft problems only continued and Kenedy could see that the City had to go.

Kenedy would make his last voyage in her in October 1952 carrying 325,000 feet of lumber from Sheet Harbour, Nova Scotia to Quincy near Boston. She sailed back to Lunenberg empty, to her new owners, Quincy Lumber Company, of Quincy, Massachusetts. They used her for transporting coal and potatoes between Massachusetts and Prince Edward Island, when yet another shaft broke and a motor vessel the Arctic Sealer was chartered to take her to Lunenburg, for repair. On 29 December 1952 while she was on tow out of Yarmouth at Chebogue Point, Nova Scotia, the towing cable snapped, and she was anchored. The tide dropped by 12 feet, leaving her aground on the Chebogue ledge. A cabin stove fell over and a fire broke out, quickly spreading throughout the vessel destroying much of her. In a week her remains slid off the ledge into five fathoms of water.

== Exhibits ==
The Yarmouth County Museum has a number of artefacts, including a nameplate with the name "Samson" on one side and the City of New York on the other.
