= Randulf Hansen =

Norwegian ship designer

Lars Randulf Hansen
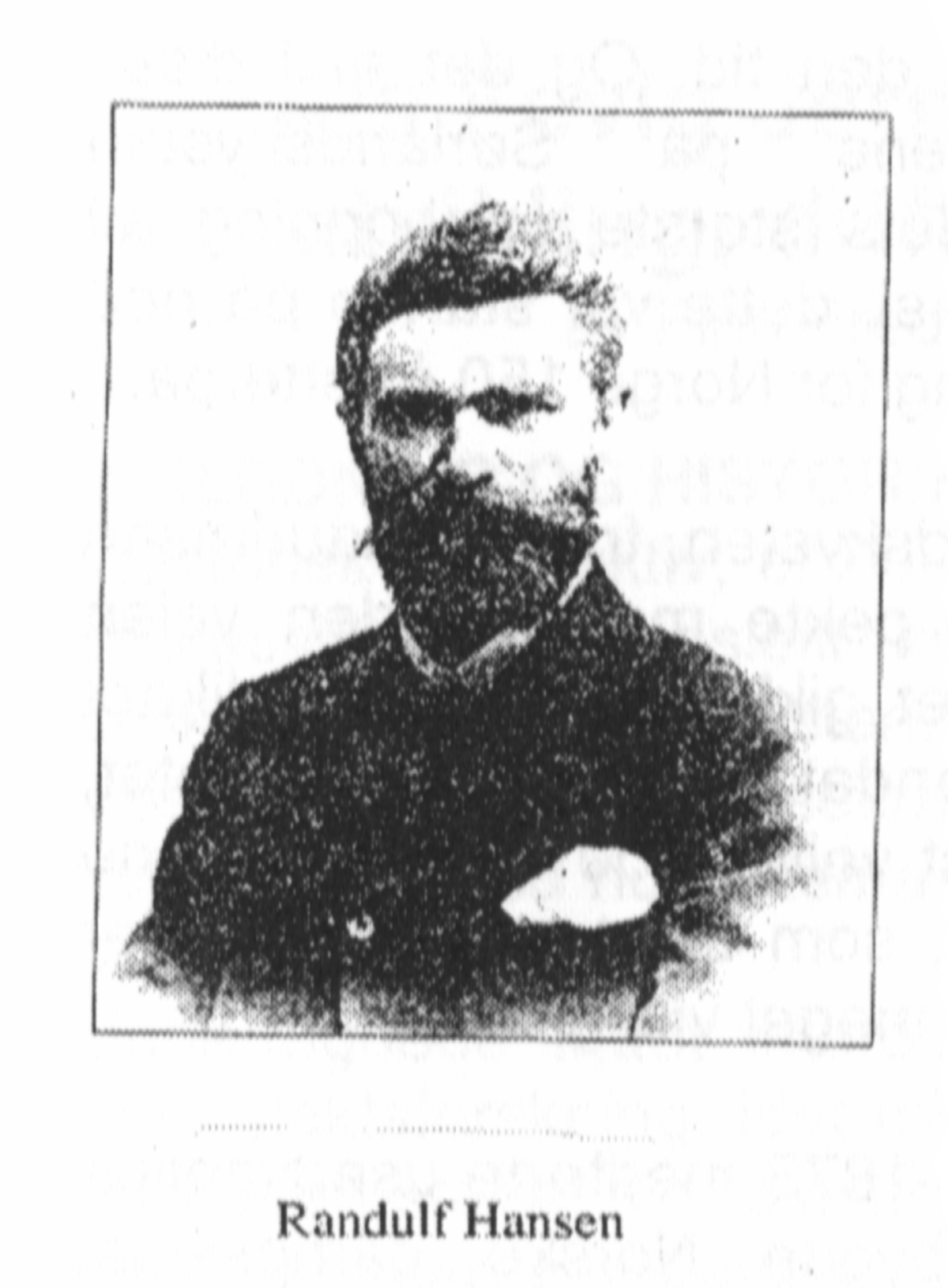
- Born: 26 August 1858; Bergen, Norway
- Died: 13 September 1942 (aged 84); Fjære Municipality, Aust-Agder
- Occupation: Ship Builder
- Spouses: Gunda Cornelia Olsen

Randulf Hansen (26 August 1858 – 5 September 1942) was a Norwegian ship designer. He was considered to be one of the country's leading naval architects of iron and steel ships. Among his designs were the British passenger liner SS Britannia (1887) and the Norwegian barque Skomvær (1890).

Hansen was born in Bergen, Norway. He started as an apprentice for the Norwegian ship designer Ananias Dekke at Brunchorst & Dekkes verft in Nordnes. He later worked in Philadelphia and New Brunswick. After a short stay at the shipyard Flages verft in Bergen, he went to the UK to work for the shipbuilding firm Raylton, Dixon & Co. at Middlesbrough.

In 1882, he returned to Bergen to work at the shipbuilder firm Martens, Olsen & Co. Hansen was offered the position of design and drafting manager at Laxevaag Maskin og Jernskibsbyggeri in Bergen. In 1889 Hansen was offered the management of Fevigs Jernskibsbyggeri, a new iron shipyard in Fevik in Fjære Municipality in Aust-Agder county. The yard in Fevik was a hull workshop, without division for boilers and machinery. Most ships were towed for completion to shipyards in Great Britain or to Fredrikstad or Bergen. During the next twenty years, over seventy steel vessels were designed by Randulf Hansen.

== Selected designs ==
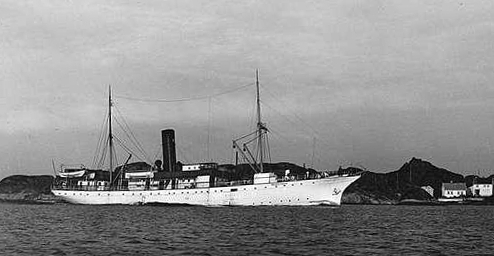
Norwegian passenger ship D/S Dronningen

- SS Britannia (1887)
- Skomvær (1890)
- D/S Vøringen (1891)
- Ragna (1892)
- D/S Dronningen (1893)
- D/S Sand (1898)
