= Axelsson =

Axelsson is a Swedish surname. Notable people with the surname include:

- Andreas Axelsson, Swedish musician
- Andreas Axelsson (criminal), Swedish criminal
- Anton Axelsson (born 1986), Swedish ice hockey player
- Bjorn Axelsson (born 1942), Swedish organizational theorist
- Carina Axelsson, live-in companion to Gustav, Hereditary Prince of Sayn-Wittgenstein-Berleburg
- Christina Axelsson (born 1949), Swedish politician
- Dick Axelsson (born 1987), Swedish ice hockey player
- Emil Axelsson (ice hockey) (born 1986), Swedish ice hockey
- Emil Axelsson (co-driver) (born 1983), Swedish rally co-driver
- Erik Axelsson Tott (c. 1419–1481), regent of Sweden
- Jacob Axelsson Lindblom, Swedish scholar
- Kurt Axelsson (1941–1984), Swedish footballer
- Lennart Axelsson (born 1941), Swedish trumpet player
- Majgull Axelsson (born 1947), Swedish journalist and writer
- Niklas Axelsson (born 1972), Swedish cyclist
- Nils Axelsson, a Swedish footballer
- Olle Axelsson (1913–1980), Swedish bobsledder
- P. J. Axelsson (born 1975), Swedish ice hockey player
- Per Axelsson (born 1966), Swedish curler
- Peter Axelsson, Swedish badminton player
- Ragnar Axelsson (born 1958), Swedish photographer
- Sun Axelsson (1935–2011), Swedish writer
- Thor Axelsson, Finnish sprint canoer
- Ulla Axelsson, Swedish actress also known as Ulla Akselson

== See also ==
- Axelsen
- Axelson
