= Arendalsfeltet =

Geologic province in Norway

Coordinates: 58.482222°N 8.7825°E

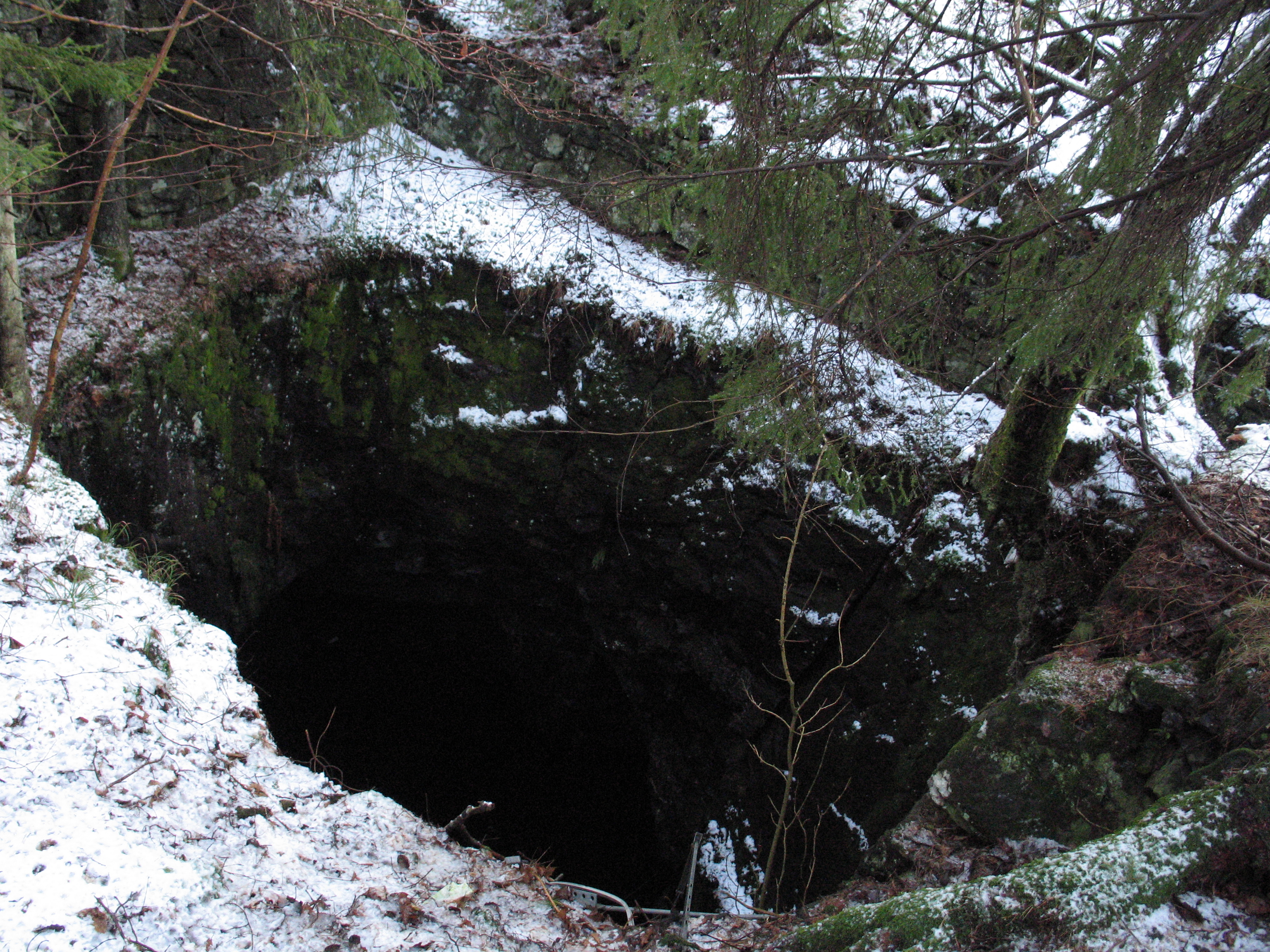
Most of the mine shafts in Arendalsfeltet is today present as steep openings ending in water, as this one from the Solborg mines at Stoa, this particular mine is called Heierås gruve.

Arendalsfeltet is a geologic province in Norway, between the village of Fevik and the town of Tvedestrand in the county of Agder, mainly situated within the borders of Arendal Municipality. Arendalsfeltet is especially known for its deposits of iron ore.

The first extraction of iron ore from Arendalsfeltet was in around 1585 and mining continued until 1975. The iron ore was of high quality and was much in demand from the old Norwegian iron works, around 2/3 of the iron ore they used came from Arendalsfeltet.

== Books ==
- J.H.L. Vogt, Norges Jernmalmforekomster, Christiania 1908, Norges geologiske undersøkelse, 51
- J.H.L. Vogt, De gamle norske jernverk, Christiania 1908, Norges geologiske undersøkelse, 46
- Molden Gunnar, Simonsen, Jan Henrik: Jerngruvedrift i Arendalsfeltet, Økomuseum Skagerrak 1994, ISBN 8291342040
