= Axelson =

Axelson is a surname. Notable people with the surname include:

- Jan Axelson (born 1949), American author and conservationist
- Joe Axelson (1927–2008), American sports executive
- Matthew Axelson (1976–2005), American Navy SEAL

== See also ==
- Axelson (company), 1920s aero engine maker
- Axelsen
- Axelsson
