= Fjære =

Fjære or Fjaere may refer to:

== Places ==
- Fjære Church, a medieval church in Grimstad Municipality in Agder county, Norway
- Fjære (village), a village in Grimstad Municipality in Agder county, Norway
- Fjære Municipality, a former municipality in the old Aust-Agder county, Norway

== People ==
- Elbjørg Fjære (1933-2021), a Norwegian politician for the Progress Party
- Preben Fjære Brynemo (born 1977), a Norwegian Nordic combined skier

== Other ==
- Fjære Granite, a coarse-grained, reddish biotite granite

== See also ==
- Fjäre Hundred
