= Axelsen =

Axelsen is a surname. Notable people with the name include:

- Geir Axelsen (born 1965), Norwegian economist, civil servant, and politician
- John Axelsen (born 1998), Danish professional golfer
- Ole Christian Axelsen (1849–1917), Norwegian businessman
- Viktor Axelsen (born 1994), Danish badminton player

== See also ==
- Axelson
- Axelsson
