= Skomvær (barque) =

Norwegian steel-hulled barque

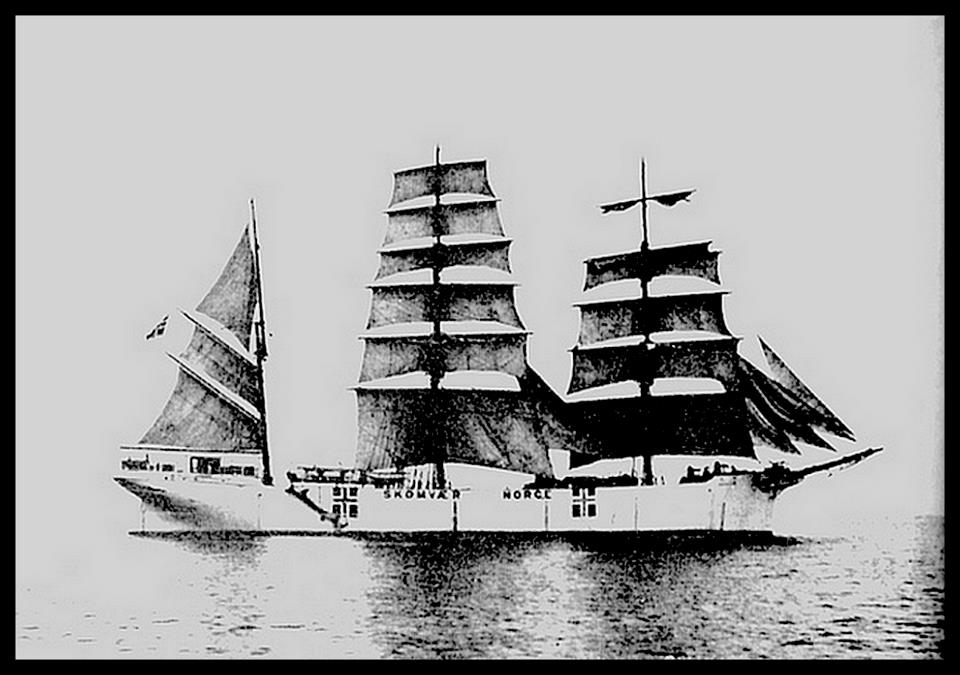
- An early photograph of Skomvær at sea

History

Norway
- Name: Skomvær
- Namesake: Skomvær Lighthouse
- Owner: Jørgen Christian Knudsen (1890–1915); Ole Christian Axelsen (1915–1917); Sven Olaus Stray (1917–1924)
- Builder: Laxevaags Maskin- og Jernskibsbyggeri, Bergen
- Cost: 284,995 kroner
- Yard number: 31
- Launched: 23 April 1890
- Sponsored by: Augusta Rafn
- In service: September 1890
- Out of service: 9 November 1922
- Identification: Call sign HPVD
- Fate: Sold for scrap in 1924

General characteristics
- Type: Steel-hulled barque
- Tonnage: 1,775 gross register tons (GRT); 1,686 net register tons (NRT); 2,640 tonnes deadweight (DWT)
- Length: 257.4 feet (78.5 m)
- Beam: 38.2 feet (11.6 m)
- Draft: 22.4 feet (6.8 m)
- Crew: 23

Skomvær was the name of a steel-hulled barque built in 1890 for J. C. & G. Knudsen in Porsgrunn in Telemark, Norway. The ship, which was designed by naval architect Randulf Hansen and constructed at Laxevaags Maskin- og Jernskibsbyggeri in Bergen, was the first sailing ship constructed with steel in Norway and for a time the largest Norwegian sailing vessel ever built. However, the ship struggled to compete in the 20th century with the advent of the steamship, and in 1924 she was decommissioned and sold for scrap.

Skomvær entered the public eye once again in 1960, when musician Erik Bye wrote the song "Skomværsvalsen" as a tribute to the ship and her crew. A fundraising effort by the artist led to the construction of the Norwegian Society for Sea Rescue boat Skomvær II that same year, and in 1986 the organization named another of its boats, Skomvær III, after the ship.

== History ==
Christen Knudsen moved from his hometown of Saltrød, near Arendal, to Porsgrunn in 1855. There he became a very successful ship-owner, and built a shipyard on the former site of the Frednes farm at the mouth of the Porsgrunn River. In his older years, Christen Knudsen decided to gradually hand over control of his shipping company to his two sons, Jørgen Christian Knudsen and Gunnar Knudsen. These men would both go on to become successful politicians in addition to their shipping trade. Jørgen Christian Knudsen, who built the house on Øvre Frednes, was the mayor of Porsgrunn in 1893 as well as a long-running Conservative Party representative in Stortinget for Porsgrunn. He was a polarizing figure in both national and local politics—he argued in Stortinget to continue the union between Sweden and Norway and was the only vote in Porsgrunn City Council against the construction of a bridge across the Porsgrunn River, opting for a steam-powered ferry instead. Gunnar Knudsen was a Liberal Party politician who was Prime Minister of Norway from 1908 to 1910 and from 1913 to 1920, and was pivotal in the creation of the Norwegian Water Resources and Energy Directorate as well as SKK, the precursor to Skagerak Energi. The two men also both had close descendants that worked in politics—Jørgen Christian Knudsen's son, Christen Knudsen, was the Nasjonal Samling representative for Telemark during World War II, and his grandson, Harald Franklin Knudsen, was Vidkun Quisling's private secretary. Gunnar Knudsen's son, Knut Andreas Knudsen, was a deputy representative in Stortinget for Telemark.

The two brothers started the firm J. C. & G. Knudsen in 1872 to manage their father's assets. In 1879, their father's shipyard on Frednes was closed, but the men continued to have success trading with their existing fleet of merchant ships. When steel began to supplant cast iron as a sturdy shipbuilding material, the men asked Randulf Hansen, a naval architect from Bergen who had studied under the likes of Ananias Dekke and Jens Gran, to design a grand new steel sailing ship for their fleet.

=== Construction ===
Hansen, who was known for his use of clipper-style bows and soft lines, drew up a plan for the ship, to which Gunnar Knudsen made a few alterations to increase the carrying capacity by 50 register tons. The ship's hull was to be built with steel plates with a controlled carbon content, which was advanced technology at the time, and would have a barque sail-plan, with three masts carrying a total of 26 sails, including topsails, staysails, headsails and gaff-rigged sails. Construction took place at the shipyard Laxevaags Maskin- og Jernskibsbyggeri in Laksevåg, near Bergen, and the ship was launched on 23 April 1890, costing 284,995 kroner in all. The speech for the handing over of the ship was given by the shipping magnate Christian Michelsen, who was chairman of the Bergen company at the time and went on to become Norway's first Prime Minister after the dissolution of the Norwegian-Swedish union. The ship was christened by Augusta Rafn, the young daughter of the ship's first captain, Hans Christian Rafn. The ship was named Skomvær, after the newly built Skomvær Lighthouse southwest of Røstlandet, and launched in September of that year with a crew of 23 men.

Unfortunately, Gunnar Knudsen was not able to see the project to completion, as J. C. & G. Knudsen had been dissolved the year before. The assets were divided in an equal arrangement between the brothers, leaving Jørgen Christian Knudsen with Skomvær. Gunnar Knudsen started a new company, Aktieselskabet Borgestad, to manage his assets, and the company still exists today as a shipping, industry, and real estate firm. The Det Norske Veritas merchant vessels registry from 1907 showed that Jørgen Christian Knudsen owned four ships, the steamships Frednæs and Taormina along with the sailing ships Korsvei and Skomvær, and his son Finn Christian Knudsen's company Langesundsfjordens Bugser-D/S owned a single sailing ship, Storegut. Gunnar Knudsen had a bigger operation, owning the sailing ship Gjendin along with five steamships managed by his company: Borgestad, Brand, Breid, Britannic, and Christen Knudsen (Breid and Christen Knudsen were later sunk by Kaiserliche Marine subs during World War I). Whereas Gunnar Knudsen's ships had a total carrying capacity of 8898 net register tons between them, Jørgen Christian Knudsen and his son's ships had a capacity of only 3885 net register tons altogether.

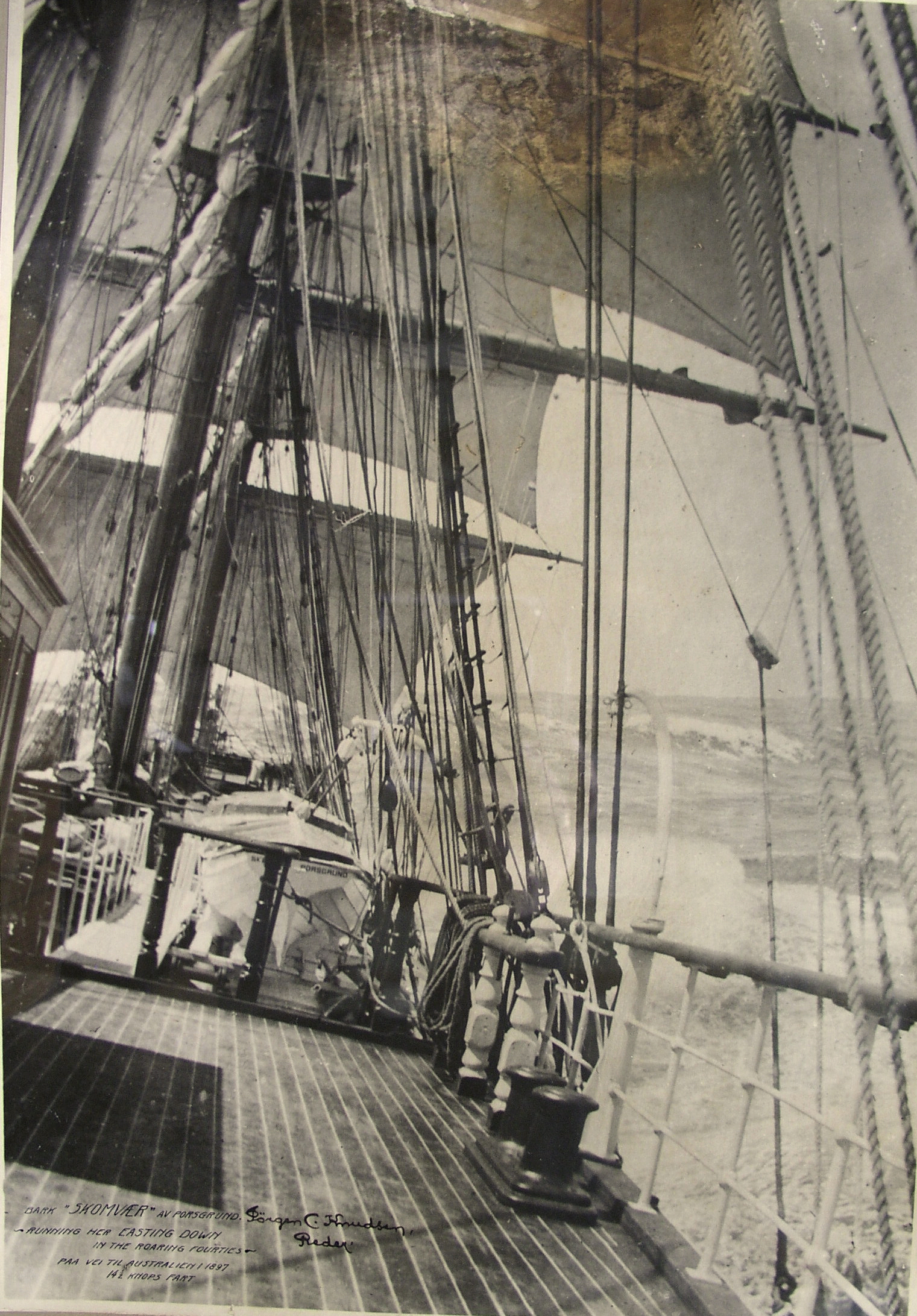
Skomvær heeling significantly at a speed of 14.5 knots on her way to Australia in 1897. Photo signed "Jörgen C. Knudsen."

=== Operation ===
Although steamships had already begun to dominate the shipping trade, Skomvær still did good business in the first few decades of the 20th century due to her high storage capacity and advanced construction. To stay profitable the ship took whatever jobs were available, carrying a variety of cargo over long distances. On 6 June 1908, the ship began one of many such voyages, departing from Newcastle, New South Wales, Australia with coal for delivery to Valparaíso in Chile. However, disaster struck on 3 July, when a strong gust of wind caused the ship to heel and the cargo to shift, resulting in her sailing with an unsafe angle of list. The crewmen were forced to cut down parts of the rig to keep the ship upright. The situation worsened as the winds picked up and more of the rig broke down, making maneuvering difficult. Though the ship sustained heavy damages, the crew trimmed some of the cargo and continued the journey. On 17 July the ship was offered assistance by the crew of the British steamship Frankby, but refused. Skomvær arrived in Valparaíso as a wreck on 25 August, where she was unloaded and underwent heavy repairs. The repairs were finally completed on 25 January 1909.

The first captain of Skomvær was Hans Christian Rafn from Porsgrunn, whose son, Robert Rafn, married one of Jørgen Christian Knudsen's daughters. Hans Christian Rafn served as captain up until his death on 26 June 1899 in New York City. He was succeeded by Niels Eriksen from Fredrikstad from 1899 to 1919, who was himself replaced by Jørgens Sørensen Berg from Larvik who held the position for just a few months in 1919. Herman Johnsen from Høvåg took over the position from 1920 to 1921, and Mathias Andreas Mollø from Grimstad served as the ship's final captain from 1921 to 1924.

In August 1915, Skomvær was sold to Ole Christian Axelsen, a wealthy businessman and member of the Order of St. Olav from Bakke Municipality, north of the town of Flekkefjord who briefly rechristened it as Yarkey Sabar. He sold the ship under its original name in July 1917 to A/S Christianssand, who in 1923 sold her to A/S Norsk Rutefart, both companies managed by Sven Olaus Stray of Kristiansand. On 9 November 1922, Skomvær was laid up near Kristiansand, never to see service again. By the time she was decommissioned, the ship had transported many types of goods all across the world, including grain from Australia, coal from England, lumber from Sweden, saltpeter from Chile, cognac from Marseille, and break bulk cargo from Spain. She had also made a total of 31 trips on the turbulent seas around Cape Horn. In February 1924, the ship was sold to Stavanger Ophugningskompani, a wrecking yard in Stavanger, dismantled her for scrap.

== Legacy ==
In 1960, Skomvær was given a new lease of life when Norwegian folk singer and television and radio presenter Erik Bye released his first studio album, Vi går ombord. The sixth track on the album, "Skomværsvalsen" (English: The Skomvær Waltz), which was co-written with Bjarne Amdahl, became one of Bye's biggest hits and received heavy rotation on the NRK radio show Ønskekonserten. The track gained additional popularity from being featured on the annual NRK Christmas broadcast "Vi går ombord," where the song was performed by the Norwegian Seamen's Choir. The song was recorded as a tribute to Skomvær and her crew, with its well-known opening line "And the ship was named Skomvær in Porsgrunn city."

Bye was also involved with the Norwegian Society for Sea Rescue (NSSR), and during a radio broadcast on Christmas Eve in 1959, he had initiated fundraising for a new rescue boat to be donated to the organization. The original plan was to build a 55-foot-long vessel, but fundraising went so well that they pushed up the fundraising target to fund an 87-foot boat identical to the rescue boat Haakon VII. The method of funding was selling shares of the boat for five kroner per piece as well as ten kroner shares that entitled the owner to ride on the boat during the official launch. The contract to build the boat was signed with the Stord-based firm AS Stord Verft by NRK director-general and later Labour Party politician Kaare Fostervoll. The boat cost 1.55 million kroner and had a 525-horsepower Bergen Marine diesel engine that could achieve speeds of up to 11 knots. She was delivered to the NSSR on 11 June 1960. The boat, which was named Skomvær II in honor of the original merchant ship, was christened by Augusta Rafn, then aged 90, who had also christened the original Skomvær.

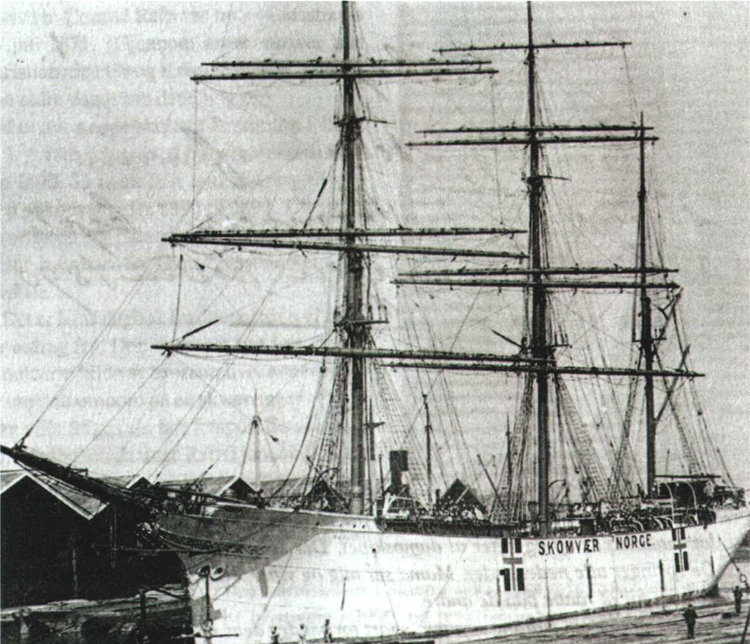
Skomvær at port, her sails furled.

In 1986, the NSSR spent 5.3 million kroner on a new rescue boat, Skomvær III, with two 625-horsepower MAN Diesel engines giving her a top speed of 25 knots. They sold Skomvær II that same year for 1.6 million kroner to the Swedish Sea Rescue Society, who renamed the boat Hans Hansson. The boat has since been bought by Gordon Fitton, an English geophysicist residing in Alderney in the Channel Islands, who undertook a complete restoration of the boat and named her Skomvær II once again. Skomvær III is still in operation as a rescue ship and is stationed in Lofoten near her namesake, Skomvær Lighthouse.

In 2005, the Norwegian brand Toro announced a new product, Skomvær Fish Soup, that would donate one kroner of every sale to the NSSR. The Bergen-based company chose the name because of their proximity to the former site of Laxevaags Maskin- og Jernskibsbyggeri, who built the first Skomvær. By 2007 they had raised 740,000 kroner for the organization.
