= Lou Kenedy =

American merchant marine captain

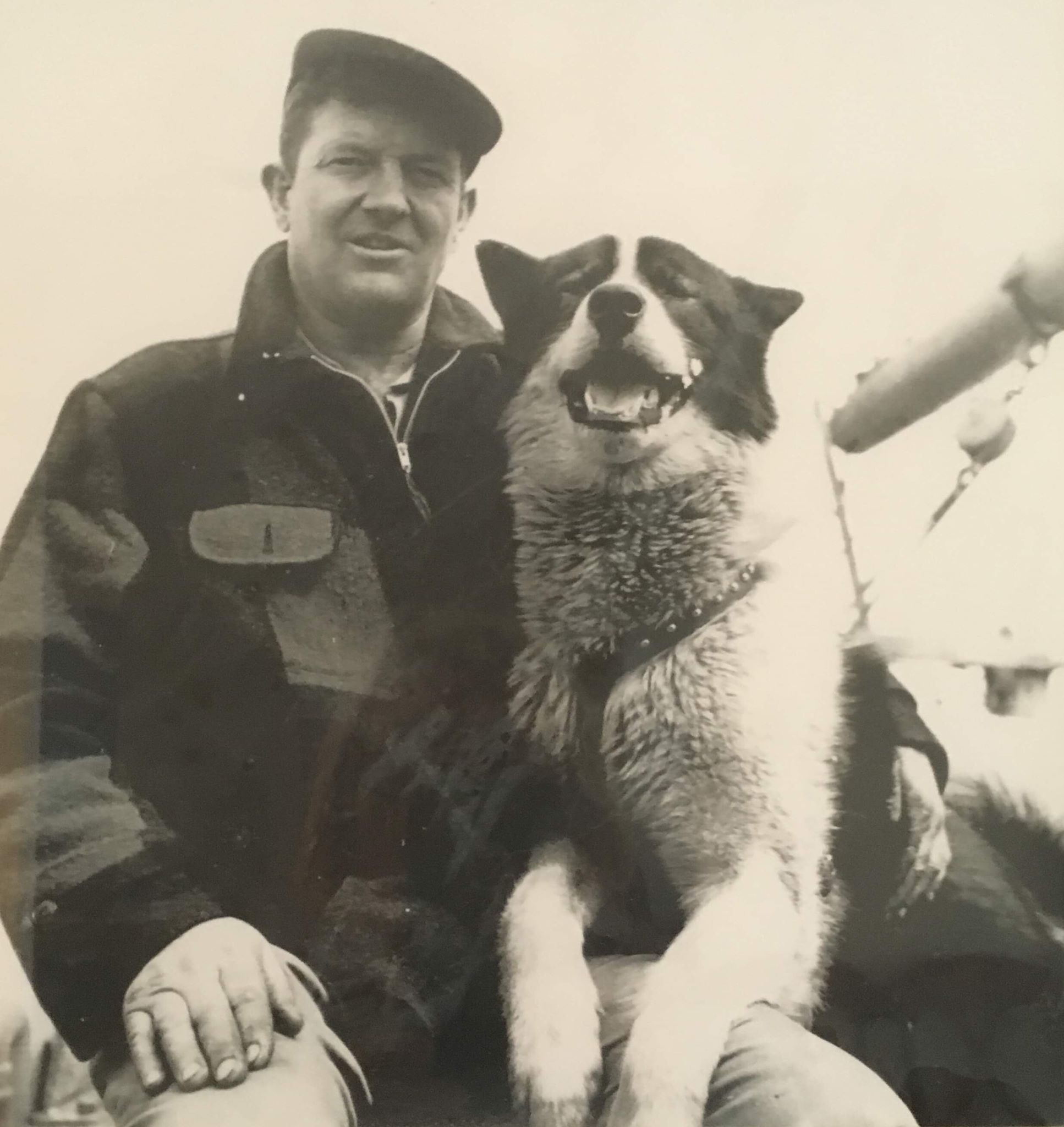
Capt. Lou aboard the schooner VEMA with his dog Gotlik

Louis Kenedy Jr. (1910–1991) was an American merchant marine captain.

Kenedy was born July 16, 1910, in Stamford, Connecticut. His parents were well off.

He spent most of his life aboard sailing vessels out of Nova Scotia and the Caribbean. He continued this legacy of cargo trading under sail from the 1930s through the 1980s, five decades after sailing cargo had seemed obsolete. He had from an early age embarked on a lifestyle choice of living almost permanently on the high seas.

Kenedy was featured in The Saturday Evening Post in an article entitled "The Incredible Captain Kenedy" in the winter of 1953-1954 written by Richard Thruelsen. These articles appear in the Dec 19, 1953; Dec 26, 1953; Jan 2, 1954; and Jan 9, 1954, issues.

Kenedy is the inspiration for “Captain Kennedy”, a song recorded in 1980 on the Hawks and Doves album by Neil Young. Young encountered Kennedy in South Florida and the Bahamas while Lou was cruising in his later years.

== Ships owned and operated ==
- ABUNDANCE

Built 1919; Rig: Tern Schooner; Matierial: Wood; Registered length: 138'; Beam: 27'8"; Draft: 15'; Builder: John McLean & Sons, Ltd., Mahone Bay, Nova Scotia; Wrecked on Jamaica November 5, 1932

- ADAMS

Launched: 1929; Rig: Tern Schooner; Material: Wood; Registered Length: 164'; Beam: 32'; Draft: 16'; Builder: Arthur D. Storey, Essex, Massachusetts; Sank at sea, crew abandoned ship to Blairesk, January 1934

- SEA FOX

Launched 1888; Rig: Gaff topsail schooner; Material: iron plate; Registered length: 115’; Beam: 23’ 11”; Draft: 12’; Builder: Harlan & Hollingsworth, Wilmington, Delaware; Designer: A. Cass Canfield; Lou won the first famous Round Barbados race in 1936; Sold and delivered to Baltimore, MD

- WAWALOAM

Launched 1919; Rig: Tern Schooner; Material: Steel; Registered length: 135’; Beam: 25’4”; Draft: 12’; Builder: Gear. Van Diesen, Waterhuizen, Holland; Sunk by U-86 August 6, 1942. Crew and dog escaping in dories and after days, everyone picked up safely by tramp steamer Irish Rose.

- City of New York

Launched 1885; Rig: Barque, converted to tern schooner; Material: Wood; Registered Length: 170’; Beam: 31’; Draft: 14’ light/20’ loaded; Builder: K. Larsen, Arendal, Norway; In 1944 Kenedy purchased the City of New York and the old ship was laid up as a hulk in Quebec. He converted the ship to a three masted schooner. Kenedy operated her hauling cargo under sail until 1952.

- VEMA (ex-HUSSAR)

Launched 1923; Rig: 3 masted gaff schooner; Material: riveted nickel steel; Registered length: 202’6”; Beam: 33’2”; Draft: 15’1”; Builder: Burmeister & Wain, Copenhagen; Chartered and eventually sold to Lamont Geological Observatory in 1953.

- ALPHA

Launched 1919; Rig: Ketch; Material: Iron; Registered length: 80’; Beam: 18’; Draft: 6’6”; Builder: unknown, Waterhuizen, Holland; Chartered for many years throughout the Bahamas.

- AQUANAUT

Launched 1941; Rig: motor vessel; Material: wood; Registered length: 83’; Beam: 18’; Draft: 6’6”; Builder: Wheeler Shipyard, Brooklyn, New York; Used mainly for rescue, movie and Decca Navigator System research.

- PIKE'S ARM

Launched 1962; Rig: motor vessel; Material: steel; Registered length: 80’8”; Beam: 22’6”; Draft: 6’; Builder: E.F. Barnes, St. John's, Newfoundland; Regularly carrying freight from Miami to Eleuthera.

- SEA FOX (ex-PHYSALIA, ex-HAL-WAN II)

Launched 1940; Rig: Ketch motorsailer; Material: wood; Registered length: 62’9” (lengthened in 1961 to 67’9”); Beam: 16’; Draft: 6’2”; Builder: Casey Boat Building, Fairhaven, Massachusetts; Kenedy's retirement home for 15 years of cruising with friends, family, but mostly enjoying having grandchildren aboard.

Lou Kenedy died on July 25, 1991, in Bridgewater, Nova Scotia. Lou and his wife Pat are buried in Lunenburg, Nova Scotia.
