= Fevik Church =

Church in Agder, Norway

- Fevik arbeidskirke
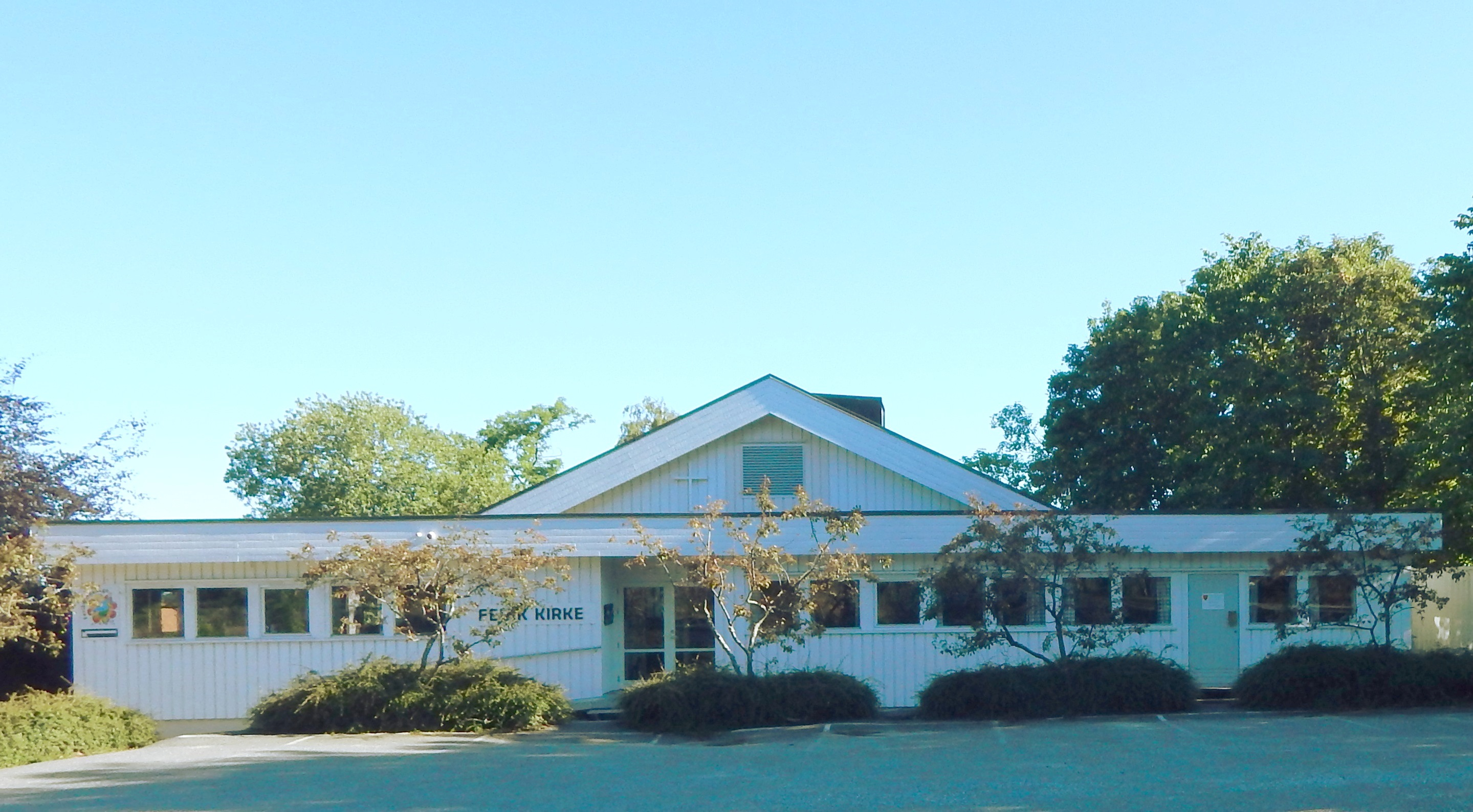
- View of the chapel
- Fevik Church
- 58.3801°N 08.6777°E
- Location: Grimstad Municipality, Agder
- Country: Norway
- Denomination: Church of Norway
- Churchmanship: Evangelical Lutheran

History
- Status: Chapel
- Founded: 2005
- Consecrated: 2005

Architecture
- Functional status: Active
- Architect: Lindefjell
- Architectural type: Long church
- Completed: 1976 (50 years ago)

Specifications
- Capacity: 100
- Materials: Concrete and wood

Administration
- Diocese: Agder og Telemark
- Deanery: Vest-Nedenes prosti
- Parish: Fjære

Fevik Church (Norwegian: Fevik arbeidskirke) is a chapel of the Church of Norway in Grimstad Municipality in Agder county, Norway. It is located in the village of Fevik. It is an annex chapel in the Fjære parish which is part of the Vest-Nedenes prosti (deanery) in the Diocese of Agder og Telemark. The white, concrete and wood chapel was built in a long church style in 1976 using designs by the architect Lindefjell. The chapel seats about 100 people.

== History ==
Originally, the building was constructed in 1976 and it was a prayer house run by various associations. In 2005, it was taken over by the Fjære parish of the Church of Norway and it has been used as a chapel (Norwegian: bedehuskapell) since that time. The church is quite small for the local congregation and the parish is in the planning and fundraising process to build a new, larger church for Fevik and to separate it from Fjære to form its own parish.

== See also ==
- List of churches in Agder og Telemark
