= Strand Hotel, Fevik =

Hotel in Fevik, Grimstad, Norway

Strand Hotel Fevik
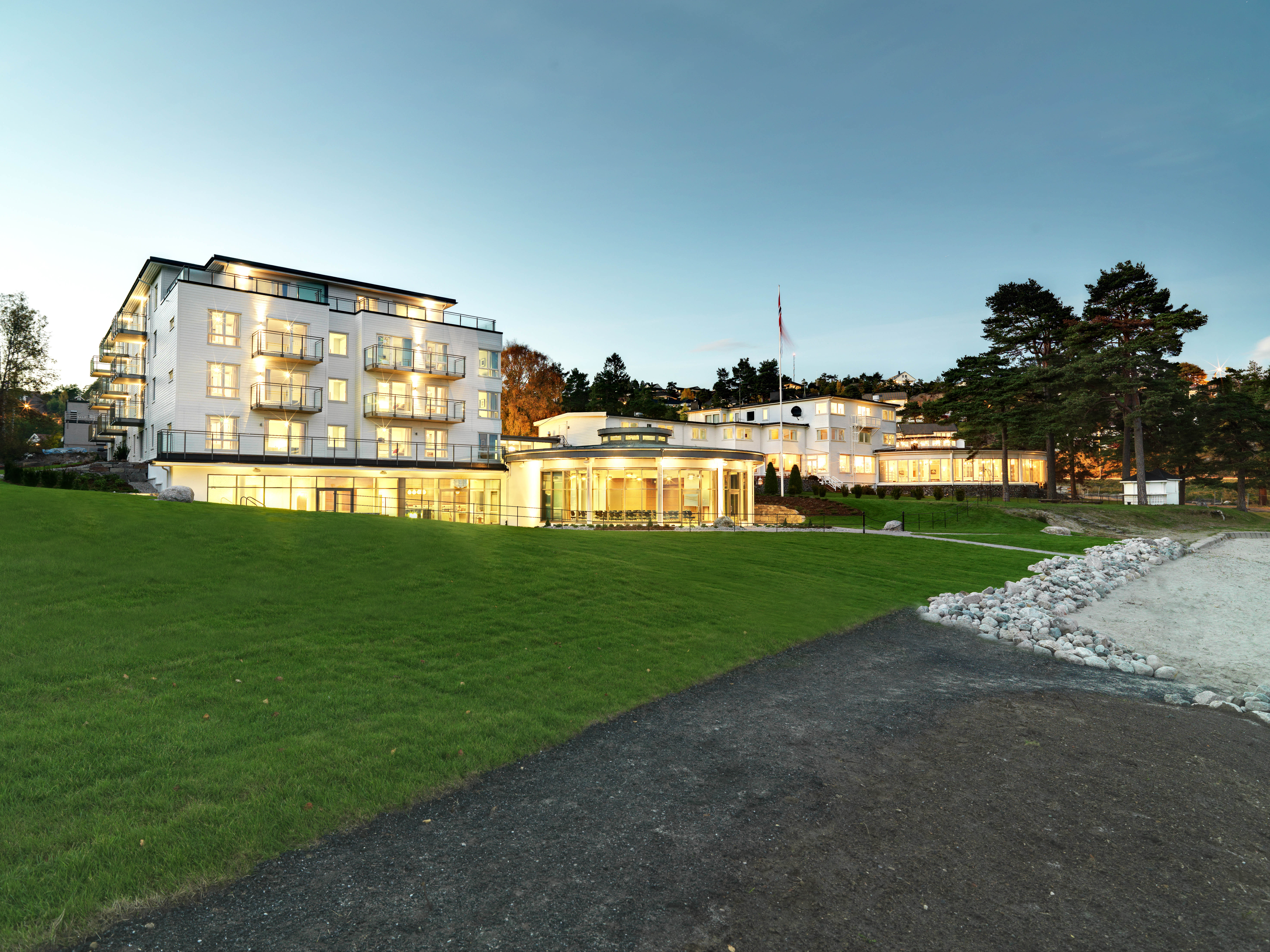
- Strand Hotel Fevik
- Interactive map of the Strand Hotel Fevik area

General information
- Location: Fevik, Grimstad Municipality, Agder, Norway
- Coordinates: 58°22′19″N 8°40′04″E
- Opened: 17 May 1937
- Owner: Classic Norway Hotels

Design and construction
- Architect: Eilert Smith

Other information
- Number of rooms: 40–43 (at opening)

Website
- www.strandhotelfevik.no

Strand Hotel Fevik is a seaside hotel in Fevik which is in Grimstad Municipality, Agder county, Norway. The hotel opened on 17 May 1937 and was developed by hotelier Axel Lund in partnership with restaurateur Sigfred Stephensen of Restaurant Blom in Oslo.

Designed in a functionalist architectural style overlooking the Skagerrak coast, the hotel formed part of a broader effort to develop the Sørlandet region as an international tourist destination.

During the German occupation of Norway in the Second World War, the building was requisitioned and used as a German convalescent home.

The hotel later became associated with the author Roald Dahl, who visited regularly for many summers. A major extension completed in 2010 expanded the hotel with additional rooms and conference facilities.

== History ==
=== Planning and construction ===
Strand Hotel Fevik was planned by the Norwegian hotelier Axel Lund as part of efforts to promote the southern Norwegian coast as a tourist destination.

Construction began in the mid-1930s, and the foundation was completed in 1934. The hotel opened to guests on 17 May 1937, Norway's Constitution Day, while an official opening ceremony was held on 5 June the same year.

The building was designed by architect Eilert Smith and originally contained around 40–43 guest rooms according to contemporary sources.

The construction cost was reported as approximately 325,000 Norwegian kroner. The hotel included a large ballroom, Neptunsalen, which could accommodate around 400 guests, as well as dining rooms overlooking the sea.

The opening ceremony attracted around 150 invited guests including public officials, mayors from nearby cities, and prominent figures in Norwegian business and political life.

Press coverage described the new establishment as “a seaside hotel of international dimensions in idyllic surroundings”.

=== Early years ===
During its first seasons the hotel quickly established itself as a popular summer destination along the Sørlandet coast. Newspapers reported that the hotel was fully occupied during the summer of 1937.

Among the guests were several prominent international visitors including former Norwegian prime minister Johan Ludwig Mowinckel, English shipowner Baxter Young, Japanese diplomat Phanatkit Komantra, German industrialist Fritz Smith and Swedish countess Margit Bonde.

The hotel initially operated as a seasonal summer hotel, though its large halls were also used for events during other parts of the year.

=== Architecture and interior decoration ===
The hotel was designed in a functionalist architectural style typical of Scandinavian resort architecture of the 1930s.

Interior decoration was created by the Norwegian painter Ørnulf Salicath, who produced murals and decorative programs in several of the hotel's public rooms.

His designs included mythological motifs as well as themes inspired by Henrik Ibsen’s poem Terje Vigen. In 1956 the original Terje Vigen decoration was removed during a redesign of the restaurant interior.

=== Second World War ===
Following the German invasion of Norway in 1940, Strand Hotel Fevik was requisitioned by German forces and used as a convalescent home (Erholungsheim) for soldiers.

A wartime intelligence report preserved in the Norwegian National Archives recorded that the building carried a Red Cross marking on its roof and that the property was surrounded by barbed wire and guarded.

The report also described defensive measures along the nearby coastline, including barbed-wire entanglements along the beach and a machine-gun position near the lighthouse. These installations reflected German concerns that the long sandy beach at Fevik could serve as a potential landing site for Allied forces.

=== Postwar development and modernization ===
After the liberation of Norway in 1945 the hotel resumed operation as a seaside resort and gradually re-established itself as a popular summer destination on Norway's southern coast.

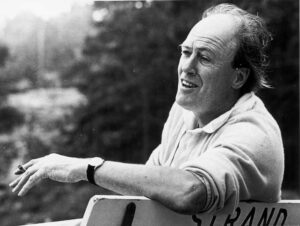
Roald Dahl at Strand Hotel Fevik

In the decades following the war the hotel became known as a venue for social gatherings, celebrations and summer holidays. The author Roald Dahl was among the guests who visited the hotel regularly for many years.

During the 1950s several changes were made to the property, including the addition of an annex building known as Stjernen and a cafeteria.

The property was sold in 1975 and subsequently operated by several different owners.

Construction of a major extension began in August 2009. The project added approximately 2,700 square metres of new floor space including 42 additional guest rooms, a conference department and wellness facilities. The expansion was completed in September 2010 and connected to the original building by glass corridors designed to integrate the historic and modern structures.

The hotel later became part of the Norwegian hospitality group Classic Norway Hotels.

== Cultural role ==
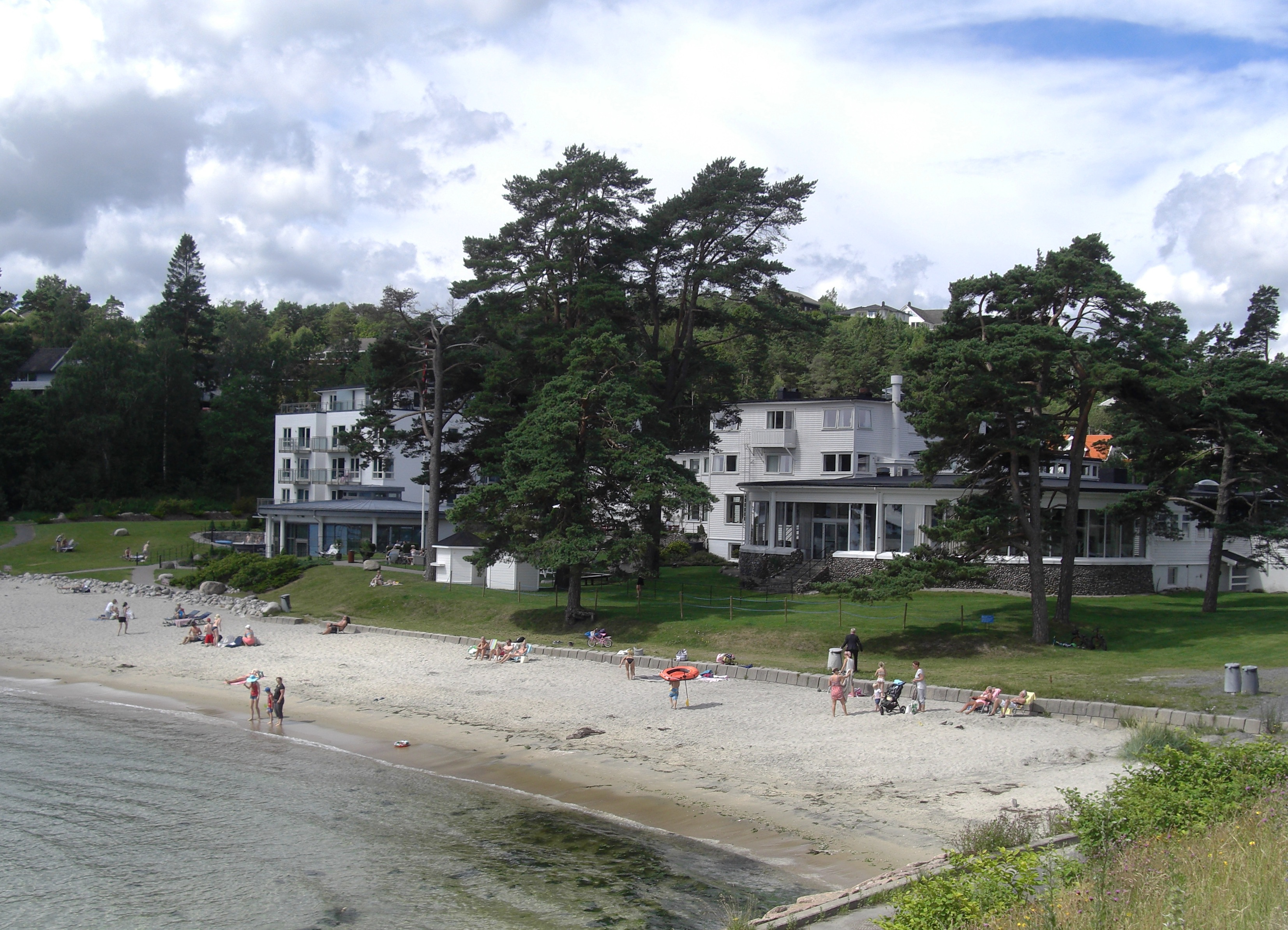
Strand Hotel, 2016

From its opening in the 1930s the hotel played a significant role in the development of tourism along Norway's southern coast.

The establishment helped promote Fevik as a seaside resort destination and remained an important regional meeting place throughout the 20th century.

The hotel is often cited as one of Norway's traditional seaside resort hotels (badehotell).

== See also ==
- Tourism in Norway
- Functionalism (architecture)
