= Georgernes Verft =

Norwegian area in Bergen

Coordinates: 60°23′53″N 5°18′30″E

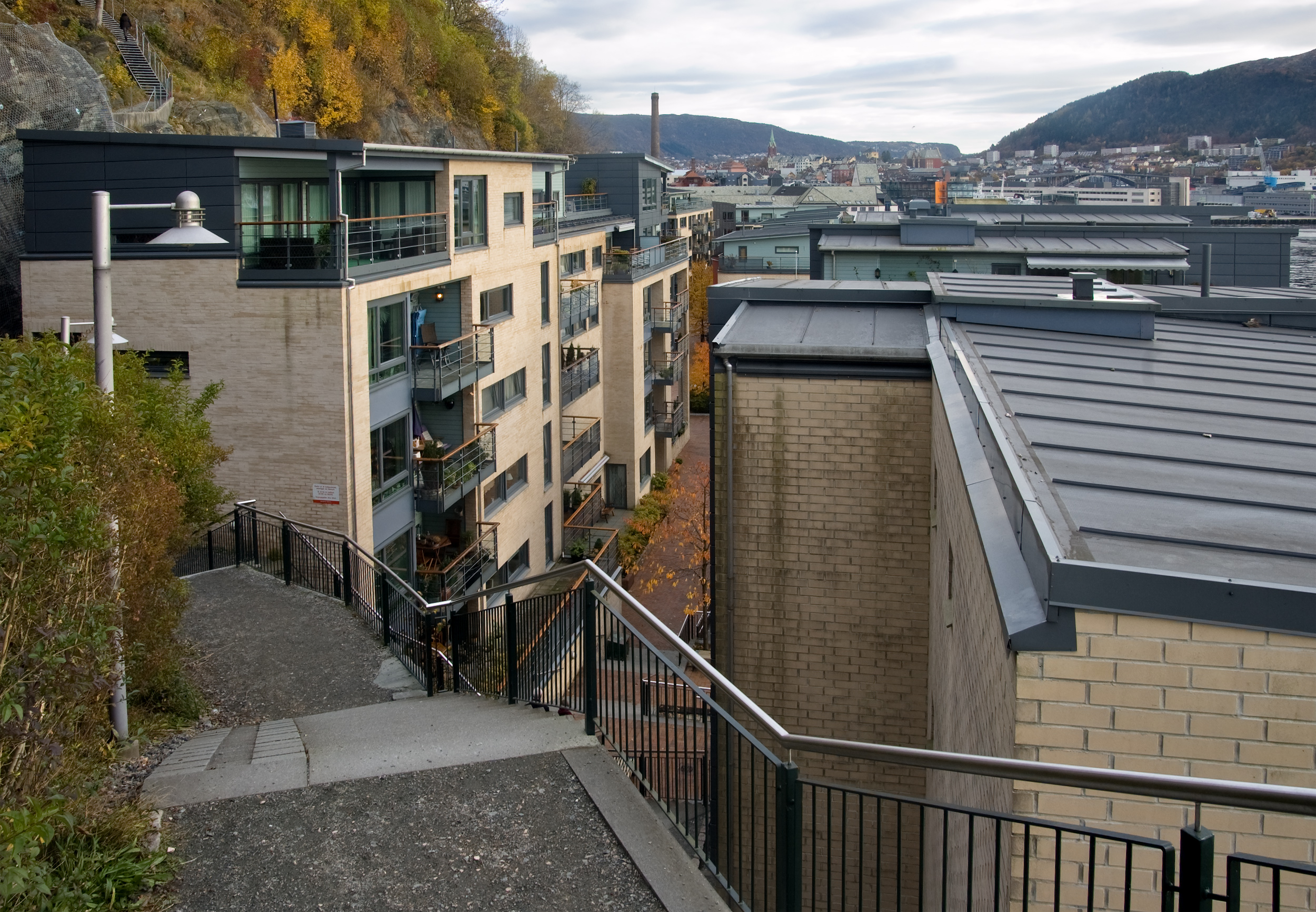
Georgernes Verft is a residential area in Bergen, Norway

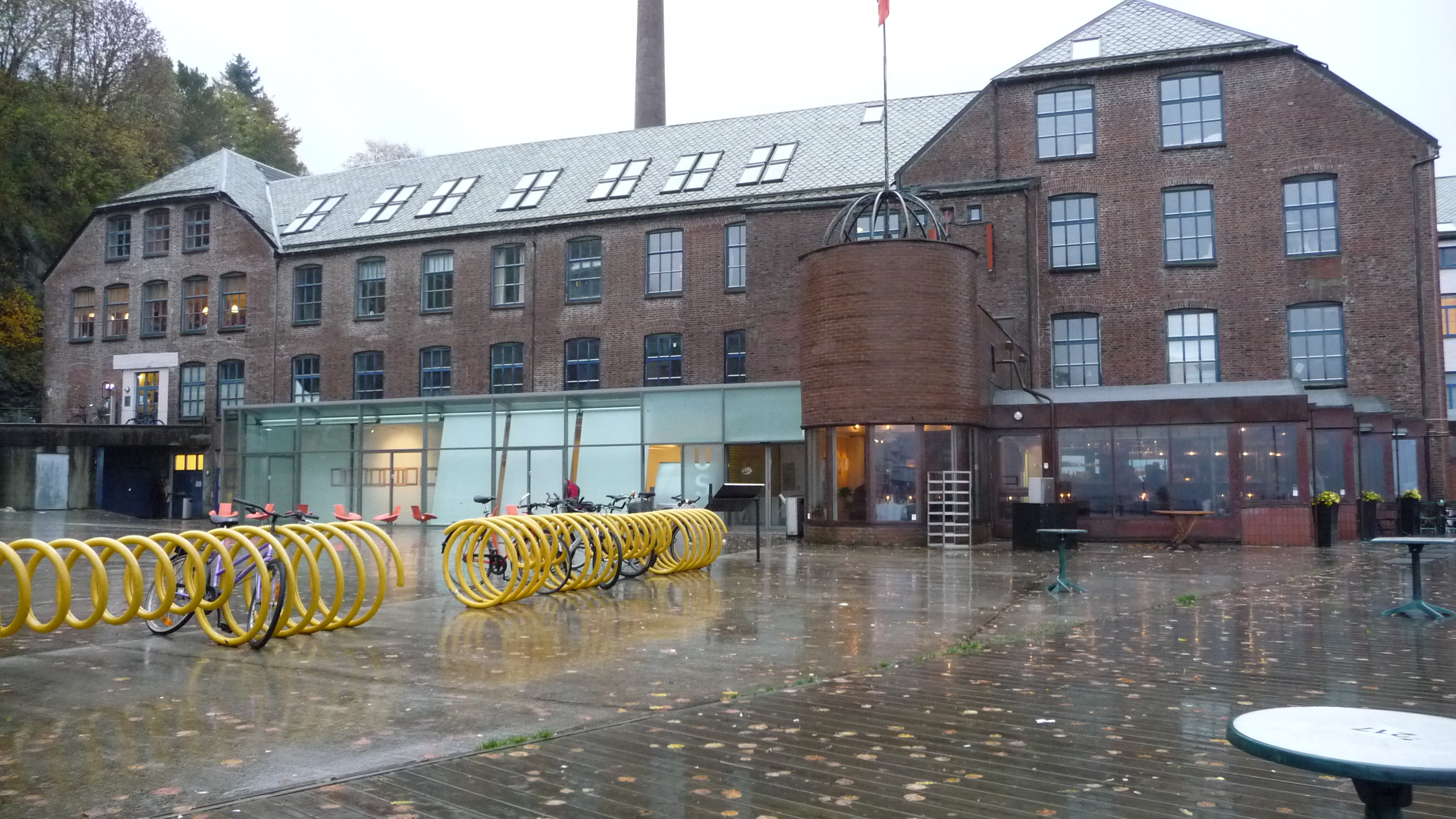
USF Verftet cultural center in Bergen

Georgernes Verft is an area located on the peninsula of Nordnes in Bergen, Norway. It was named after the shipyard that used to operate in the area. Over time the surrounding area was populated by shipyard workers and is still known as Verftet. Today a large residential complex dominates the area.

The yard was established in 1784 by Georg Brunchorst and Georg Vedeler thus explaining the name "Georges' shipyard". In the 1850s the yard was taken over by Ananias Dekke who modernised the site and built a new dock. The shipyard was known to have produced some of the fastest sailships in the world and also supplied ships to the Royal Danish Navy and Royal Norwegian Navy. The production of wooden sailing ships continued until the late 1800s when steel ships became dominant.

Upon the end of the yard its owner turned to the expanding knitting industry and established a prosperous factory of 3000 m². This building still stands largely unchanged. At the start of the 1900s, the knitting industry needed a bigger factory and had to move to a location outside Bergen. This coincided with the rapid expansion of the sardine industry and in 1910 United Sardine Factories Ltd. (USF) was established. The production of canned goods also expanded the industrial area to 15000 m². Most of these buildings are still intact.

The canning industry was restructured and the USF factory disbanded in 1983. The property owner AS Norwegian Preserving Company opened parts of the old sardine factory to artists in the following year. A close cooperation between the landowner and the artists resulted in an innovative and cross-genre collective of art and other culture in the USF Verftet cultural center (USF - Kulturhuset).

== Related reading ==
- Hartvedt, Gunnar Hagen (1994) "Nordnes" in Bergen byleksikon (Oslo: Kunnskapsforlaget) ISBN 82-573-0485-9
