= Fjære Granite =

Geological formation in Agder, Norway

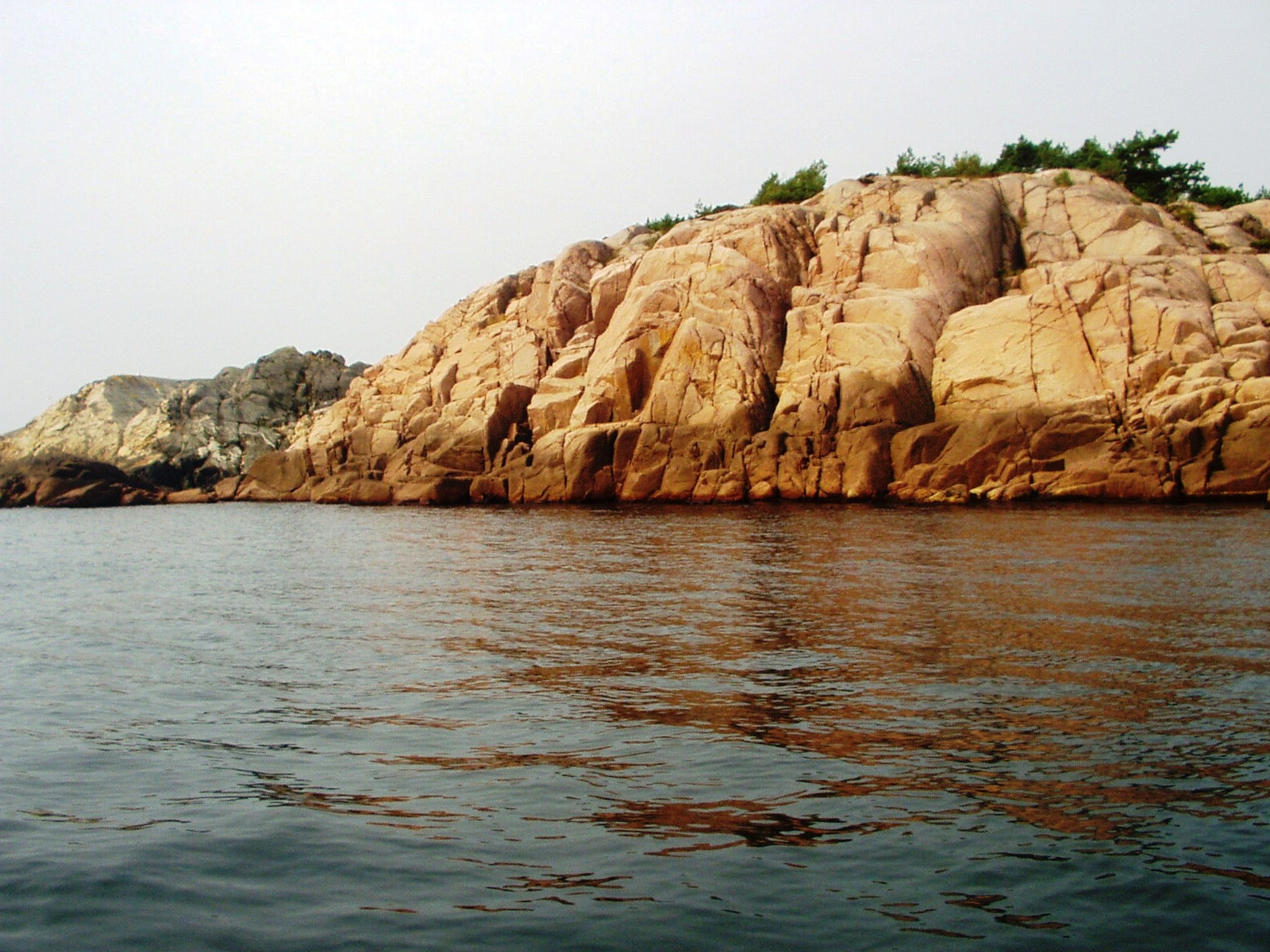
Vaholmen east of Grimstad consists almost entirely of Fjære granite

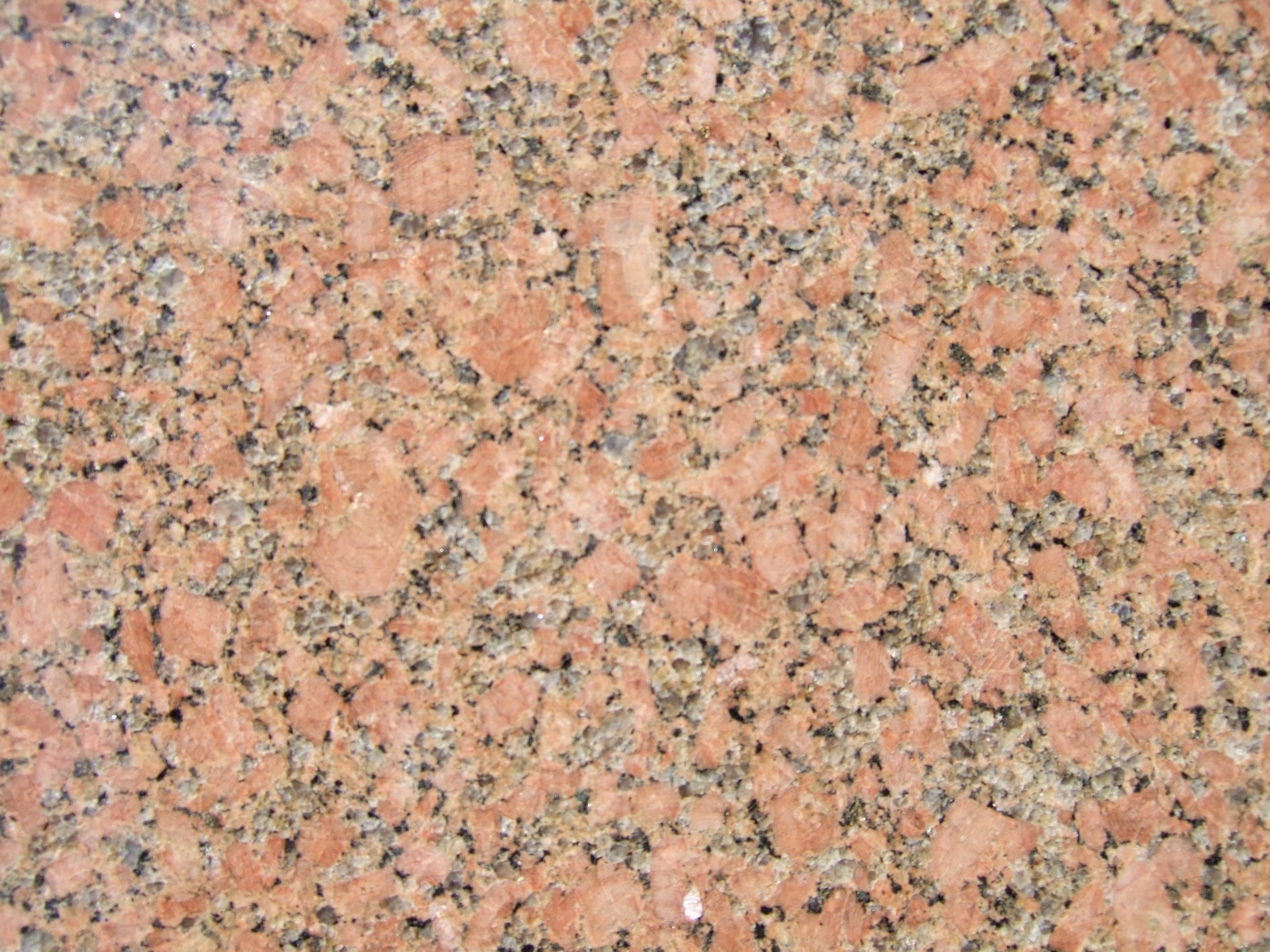
Fjære Granite, polished surface

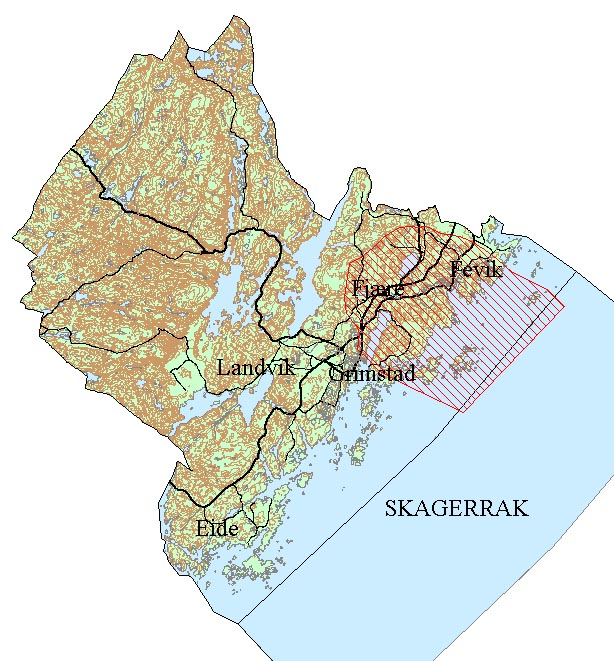
Fjære Granite, geographical distribution

Fjære Granite (Norwegian: Fjæregranitt), also known as Grimstad Granite, Fevik Granite, or Red Star Granite, is a coarse-grained, reddish biotite granite found east of Grimstad in Agder county in southern Norway—particularly near the village of Fevik. The rock formation is estimated to be approximately 950 million years old, dating back to the Proterozoic eon.

== Geology and occurrence ==
Fjære Granite is noted for its robust, red appearance. It features large crystals of red microcline alongside lighter albitic feldspar, bluish quartz, and clusters of biotite up to 10 mm in size. The deposit forms an almost oval area extending from the town of Grimstad nearly to the border with Arendal Municipality, and it continues beneath the Skagerrak Sea.

== Uses and historical quarrying ==
Historically, this granite was popular in construction, interior design, monuments, and gravestones. Quarrying began in the 1870s, and by 1905, three granite workshops operated, employing around 50–75 people each. Much of the stone was exported. After World War II, demand declined due to competition from other red granites in the global market.

In 1966, operations resumed at the Fjæreheia quarry under the trade name New Red Star, but this effort ceased around 1970 due to insufficient market demand.

== Official symbol and cultural Role ==
In the early 1990s, Fjære Granite was designated as the official provincial stone (fylkesstein) of Aust-Agder county (now part of Agder county). Following the cessation of industrial use, the abandoned quarry has since been repurposed as an open-air theatre known as Fjæreheia Amphitheatre, built between 1992 and 1993, with the granite wall as its dramatic backdrop.

== World War II: "Hitler Stone" ==
During the Nazi occupation of Norway in World War II, Fjære Granite was requisitioned by Nazi Germany for use in monumental architecture including 'victory' monuments, commissioned by Albert Speer. After the occupation of Norway in 1940, raw blocks weighing up to 10 tons were ordered and cut from the Fjæreheia quarries and prepared for transport. Some were shipped to Germany before the war's end, while many remained and were later repurposed for local construction and paving in Norway, earning the moniker “Hitler Stones” (Hitler-stein).
