= Fevik =

Village in Grimstad Municipality, Norway

- Village
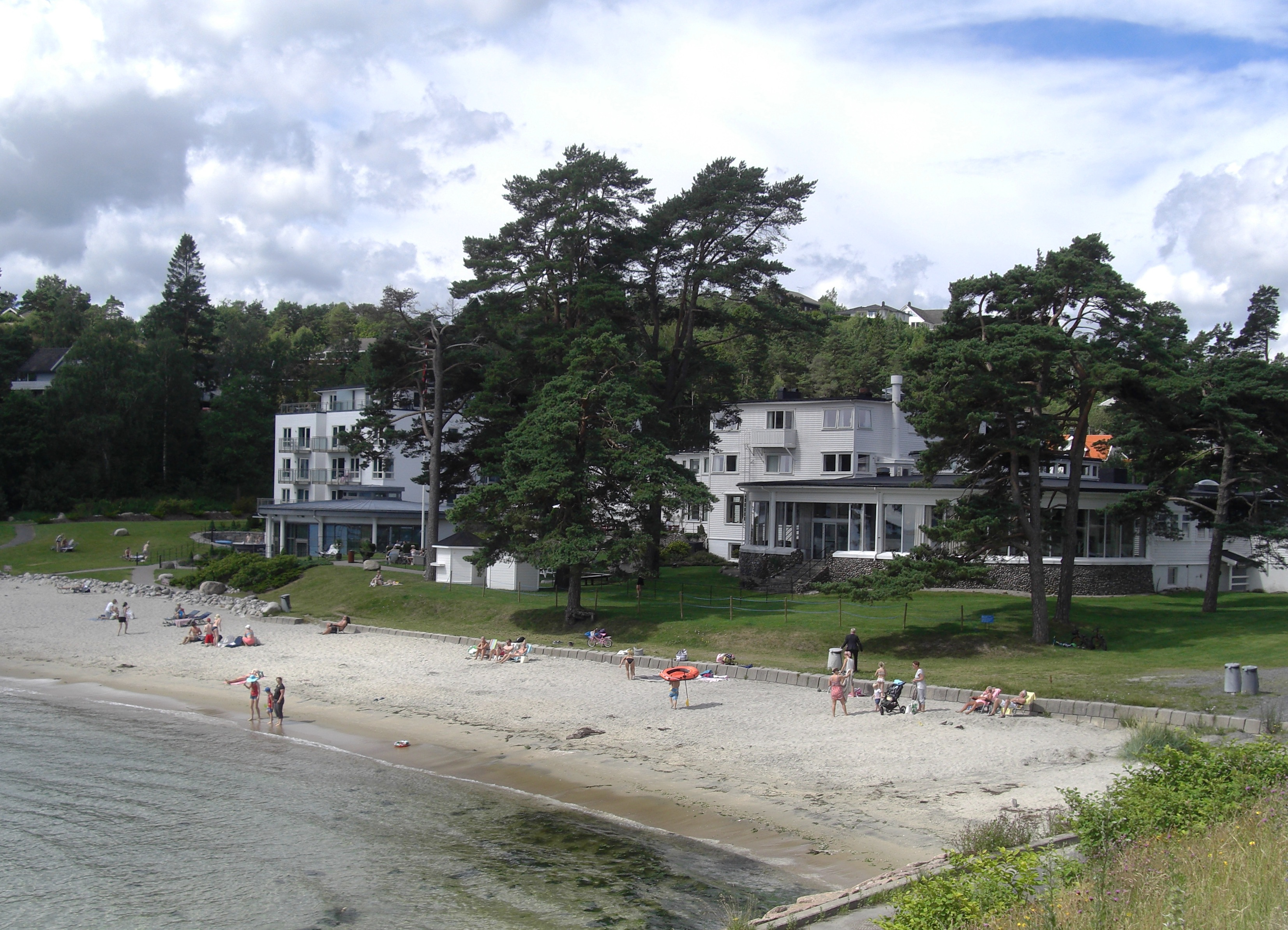
- View of the beach at Fevik
- Interactive map of Fevik
- Coordinates: 58.37852°N 8.67586°E
- Country: Norway
- Region: Southern Norway
- County: Agder
- District: Østre Agder
- Municipality: Grimstad Municipality

Area
  - Total: 4.21 km^{2} (1.63 sq mi)
- Elevation: 18 m (59 ft)

Population (2021)
  - Total: 6,037
  - Density: 1,434/km^{2} (3,710/sq mi)
- Time zone: UTC+01:00 (CET)
  - Summer (DST): UTC+02:00 (CEST)
- Post Code: 4870 Fevik

Fevik is a coastal village and popular seaside resort in Grimstad Municipality in Agder county, Norway. Situated along the Skagerrak coast, Fevik lies approximately 7 kilometres (4.3 mi) northeast of the centre of the town of Grimstad and 15 kilometres (9.3 mi) south of the center of the town of Arendal. The neighboring village of Vik is located just southwest of Fevik.

Historically, Fevik was a prominent shipbuilding village. By the late 19th century, the Fevikkilen bay was home to the largest shipyard for iron hulls in Northern Europe, solidifying its place in maritime history.

Over the years, the village of Fevik has grown together by conurbation with the nearby town of Arendal. The 4.21-square-kilometre (1,040-acre) village had a population (2021) of 6,037 and a population density of 1,434 inhabitants per square kilometre (3,710/sq mi). Since 2021, the population and area data for this village area has not been separately tracked by Statistics Norway, but it has been grouped together with the urban area of Arendal.

Fevik is well-connected by transport networks, with Norwegian County Road 420 running through the village and European Route E18 passing to the north. Public transportation in Agder County includes a commuter route linking Grimstad, Arendal, and Eydehavn. The village is also home to Fevik Church, a notable local landmark.

In the 1950s and 1960s, Fevik gained renown as a tourist destination, celebrated for its scenic beaches and accommodations, making it a favored getaway along Norway’s southern coast.

== History ==
Fevik has been inhabited since ancient times, as evidenced by numerous archaeological sites dating back to the Migration Period. The area is rich in burial mounds, particularly on Feviktoppen and in the historic farm landscape around Fevikmoen. The burial field at Fevikmoen forms part of a larger prehistoric cemetery landscape and contains at least eleven burial mounds, several of which historically had standing stones (bautasteiner). The monuments were recorded during 19th-century antiquarian surveys, including those by archaeologist Nicolay Nicolaysen. Early excavations carried out in 1880 recovered significant artifacts, including boat remains and wooden objects fastened with iron rivets. Burial mounds from the Bronze Age and Iron Ages along the coastline attest to the region's extensive activity in earlier periods.

Historically, Fevik's society was shaped by agriculture and maritime pursuits. Prior to its development as a coastal resort and residential area, Fevik formed part of a rural agrarian landscape within the old Fjære Municipality. The area was characterized by farmsteads and cultivated land, several of which have documented continuity from the early modern period. Historic farms such as Fevikmoen illustrate long-term agricultural use in the area, alongside maritime livelihoods that later became dominant along the coast.

By the mid-19th century, smaller commercial and industrial enterprises began to emerge, laying the foundation for economic diversification. In later years, the area developed a reputation as a destination for tourism, further contributing to its growth and transformation.

=== Fevik Iron Shipyard ===
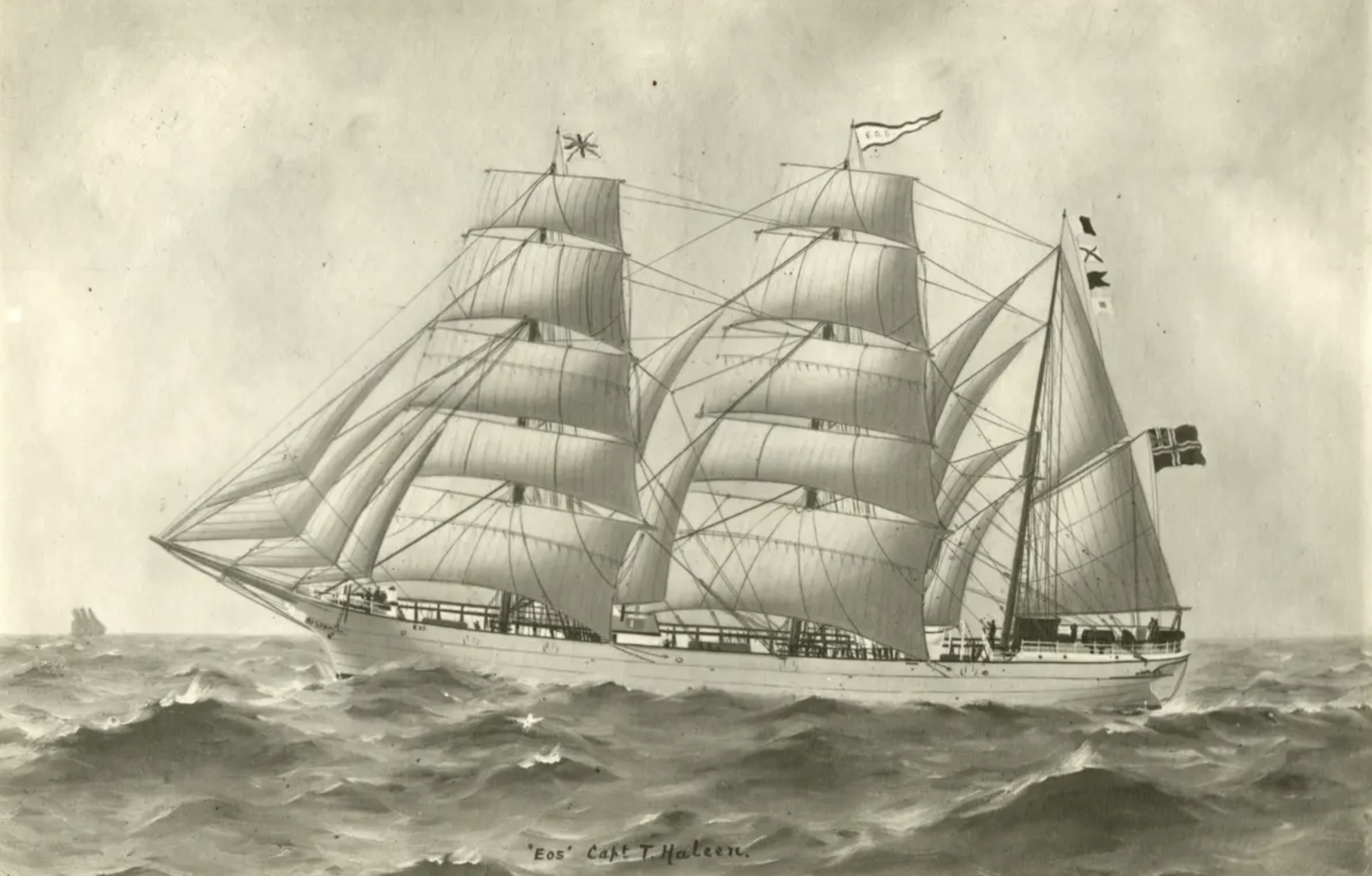
The Eos, b.1893 Fevik Iron Shipyard, Fevik, Grimstad, Norway

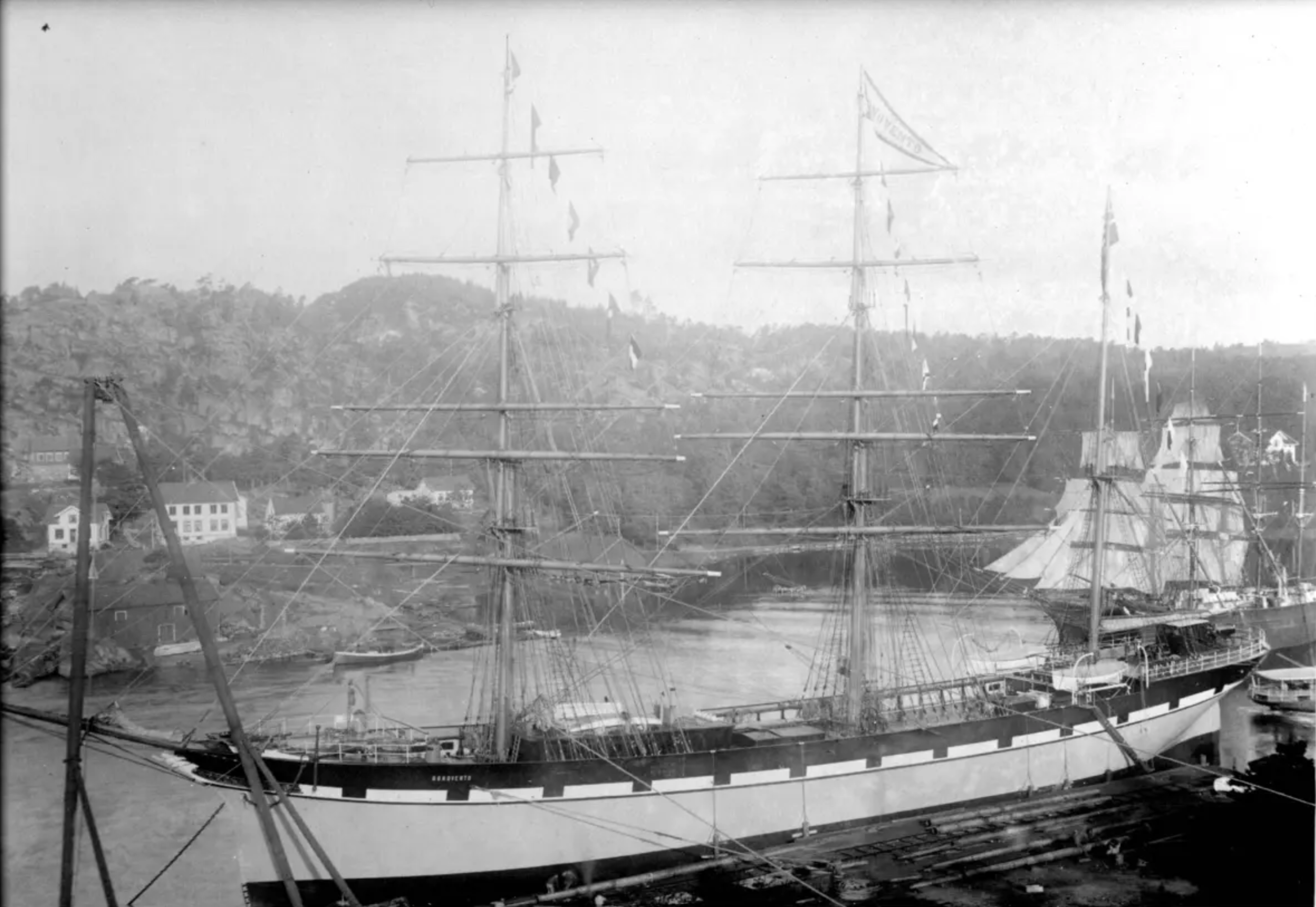
The Bonovento, b.1892 at slip in Fevik Iron Shipyard, Fevik, Grimstad, Norway (Fevik in background)

The Fevik Iron Shipyard, originally established in 1890 as Fevig Jernskibsbyggeri, was a significant industrial venture in the bay of Fevikkilen. The shipyard was founded by brothers Carl Boe, a chief prosecutor, and Jacob Boe, a shipyard owner, with Randulf Hansen serving as designer and managing director. Financial backing also came from an English investor, Scrafton, who faced bankruptcy in 1893–94, leading to a temporary closure in the autumn of 1894 when all employees were laid off.

The shipyard resumed operations in 1895 and later saw new ownership. In 1907–08, Drammens Jernstøberi & Mek. Verksted, Myhrens Verksted, and Fredrikstad Mek. Verksted joined as co-owners. Despite these efforts, the business struggled financially and declared bankruptcy in 1909, marking the end of Fevig Jernskibsbyggeri under its original name.

From 1909 to 1911, the shipyard remained inactive until a consortium, including Knut Dahl, Harald Jensen, K.G. Meldahl, and wholesaler R. Jessen, reconstructed and reopened it as A/S Sørlandets Jernskibsbyggeri. Engineer A. Breda was hired as the operations manager, and the shipyard resumed production. However, by 1916, business declined again, and the shipyard was purchased by Fredrikstad Mek. Verksted in 1917.

The shipyard's final project was an unfinished 6,000-ton turbine ship (building no. 256), contracted by B. Stolt Nilsen of Haugesund. This hull was later sold to A/B Götaverken in Gothenburg, which arranged for its completion at Langesunds Mek. Verksted. The completed ship, christened Innaren (3563 GRT), was the 14th vessel built by Langesunds Mek. Verksted and was eventually towed from Fevik to Gothenburg in the autumn of 1924.

The Fevik Iron Shipyard played a crucial role in the region's industrial history, particularly during its peak as a producer of iron-hulled ships. In 20 years, they built 71 ships. Its legacy highlights both the ambitions and challenges of Norway's maritime industry in the late 19th and early 20th centuries.

=== Stonemasonry ===
The stonemasonry industry in Fevik dates back to the 1870s, built on the high-quality Fjære granite, a distinctive stone well-suited for monuments, gravestones, and construction materials. By the early 20th century, the industry had become a significant part of Fevik's economy, with three major companies—Calberg, Evensen & Schmüser, and August Øberg—operating in the area. Together, these businesses employed between 50 and 75 workers, with much of their production destined for export.

One of the most notable contributions to the craft came in 1906, when Axel Bjørklund, then a foreman at Evensen & Schmüser, was commissioned to create the monument to Terje Vigen, now located near Fjære Church. This prominent work cemented Fevik's reputation for skilled stonemasonry.

In 1920, Bjørklund established his own company, which became known as Fevik Stone Industry. Remarkably, this company continues to operate today and remains under the management of the Bjørklund family, preserving Fevik's stonemasonry tradition into the modern era.

=== Fevikruta ===
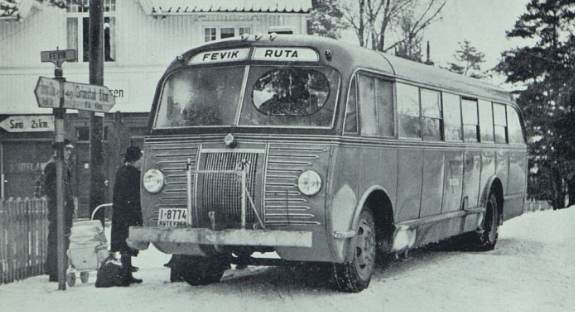
Fevikruta bus, c. 1950

In 1924, Hillman Hansen established Fevikruta, a scheduled bus service operating along the Arendal–Kristiansand route, using a converted truck. By the late 1930s, the business had been taken over by Ansgar Nilsen and Arthur Traalum, expanding to a fleet of three vehicles that transported milk, goods, and passengers.

By 1960, Fevikruta had grown significantly, operating eight buses and transporting approximately 630,000 passengers annually. The company also maintained its own workshop at Feviktoppen. However, in 1969, Fevikruta lost its operating license, and the company was acquired by ADS (later known as ATS), marking the end of its independent operations.

=== Hotel Industry ===
Fevik has a rich history in the hospitality industry, with its roots in the late 19th century. Two iconic establishments, Fevik Bad and Strand Hotel, played key roles in making the area a prime destination for visitors seeking coastal relaxation and natural beauty.

==== Coastal Sanatorium (Fevik Bad) ====
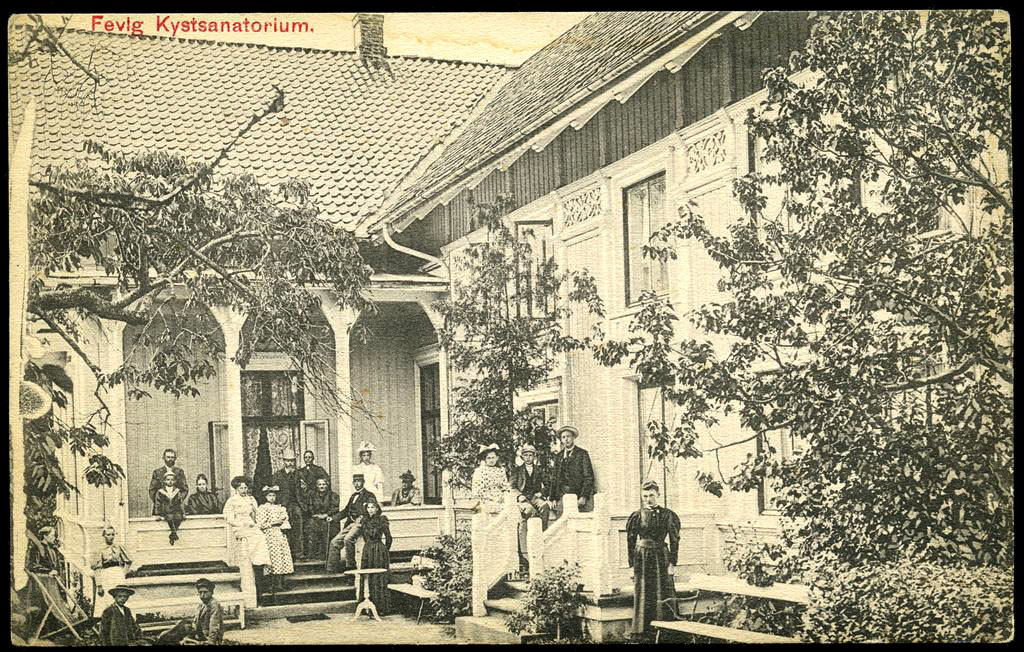
A postcard showing the Fevik kystsanatorium. c. 1800s

The Fevig Kystsanatorium, later known as Fevik Bad, was one of Norway's earliest coastal spa resorts. It was established in the late 19th century by Ole Carstensen Boe, a shipowner and founder of Boe’s Shipyard in Fevikkilen. The sanatorium was built by Johan Gottlieb Heinecke and designed by the architect Meinich. Its location, nestled along the coastline between Arendal and Grimstad, made it a sought-after destination for health and recreation.

The property featured a landscaped garden that included exotic tree species planted in the late 19th century, such as a giant sequoia (Sequoiadendron giganteum) and a European chestnut tree (Castanea sativa). By 1956, Norges Bebyggelse described the property as encompassing 12 decares of land, including a two-story main building with 19 rooms, an annex, and a detached house.

The resort was renowned for its luxurious atmosphere, catering to affluent guests with elaborate meals and entertainment. According to local history, the staff of 18 included two grooms who managed six horses and carriages. Feasts often featured stuffed roast kramsfugl (fieldfare), a delicacy painstakingly prepared by the kitchen staff.

The concept of the sanatorium was in line with the late 19th-century trend for health tourism, offering cold and hot baths, steam baths, mud baths, and pine needle baths. Guests sought not only physical rejuvenation but also the social prestige of mingling with Norway’s elite. An article in Aftenposten (1895) praised the facility's pristine sea baths and invigorating natural surroundings, calling it "a health resort of high rank."

In 1947, the property was acquired by Norsk Folkeferie and briefly used as a shelter for elderly evacuees from Kåfjord in Finnmark during the post-war crisis. The building later transitioned back to tourism, continuing as a resort until its closure in the 1970s.

Despite its decline as a tourist destination, Fevik Bad retained historical significance. In 1996, the building received the "Building Conservation Award" for its preservation. The property’s unique vegetation, particularly the giant sequoia, has been meticulously documented, with the tree reaching a height of 27.55 meters and a trunk circumference of 6.5 meters by 2010.

==== Strand Hotel ====
In 1937, the Strand Hotel was established by the "hotel king" Axel Lund, further cementing Fevik’s reputation as a tourist hotspot. The hotel became well known for hosting the author Roald Dahl, who visited regularly in the summers. During World War II, the Germans occupied the hotel, using it as a recreation center for officers.

After the war, the Strand Hotel continued to thrive. It transitioned from a summer-only resort to a year-round hotel in 1975, following its sale to new owners. Modernized with additional facilities, including a conference building, the hotel remains a central part of Fevik’s hospitality offerings today.

== Tourism ==
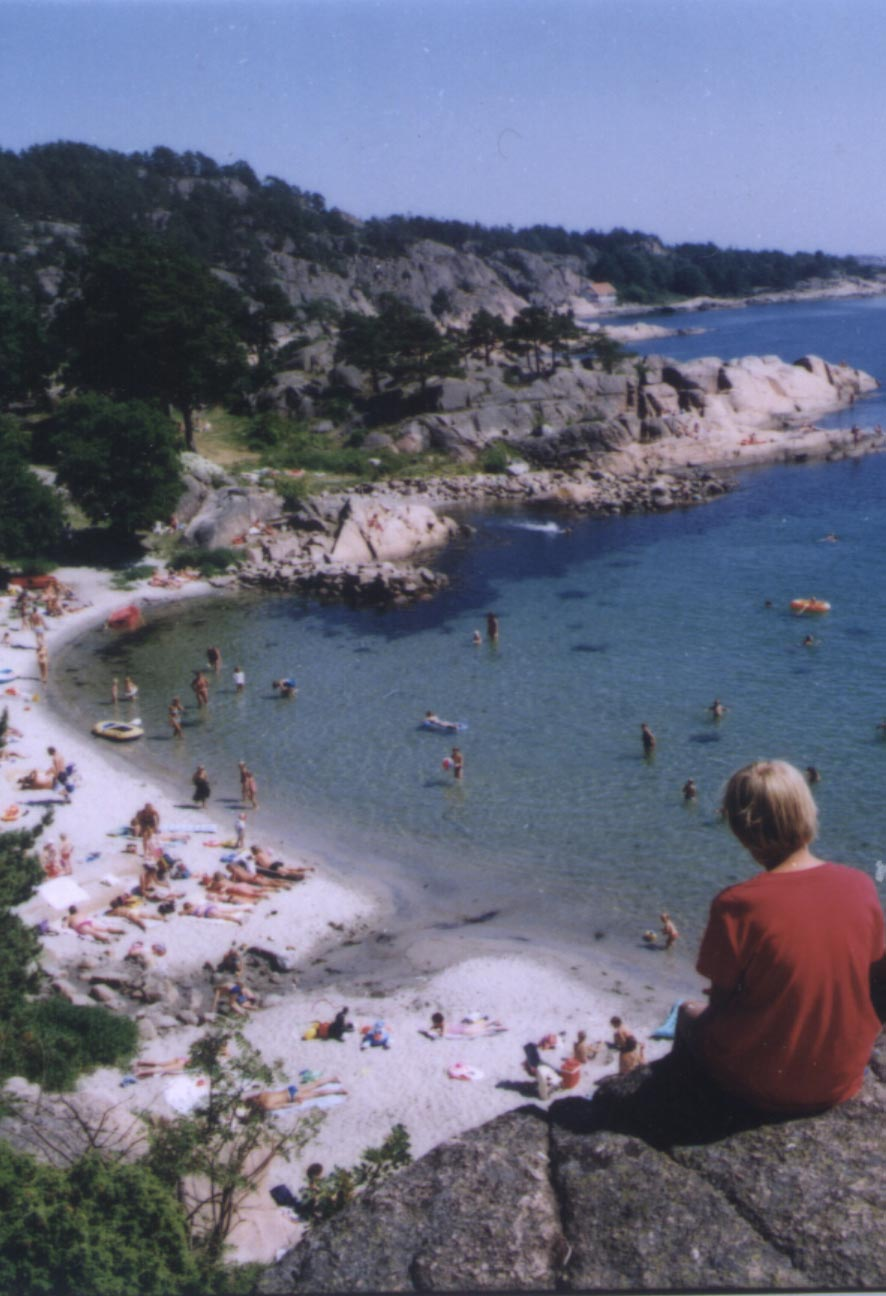
Ranviga, Fevik

Fevik enjoyed a vibrant tourism scene during its heyday in the 1950s and 1960s, a period when it became a popular summer destination for both Norwegian and international visitors. This era saw the construction of most of the holiday cabins in the area, and tourism played a major role in the local economy. At its peak, Fevik was home to a hotel and six independent guesthouses: Furuly, Jutehagen/Eikely, Fevik, Havsjå, Sørlandet, and Ranvika, all offering various accommodations for tourists. Additionally, Norsk Folkeferie operated a guesthouse known as Fevik Bad, catering to vacationers seeking a restful retreat.

In terms of camping, Fevik boasted three large campsites—Storesand, Ranviga, and Bagatell—as well as a smaller site at Fevikkilen called Frivoll Camping. These campsites offered affordable and scenic accommodations for families and outdoor enthusiasts. Storesand Beach, in particular, became renowned for its natural beauty and was frequently celebrated as Norway's best beach. It garnered recognition from notable media outlets such as VG and NRK Travel Radio. Its popularity led to the state purchasing the area in the 1970s, designating it as a public space for future generations to enjoy.

During the height of tourism in the 1950s, it was reported that Fevik’s population swelled to up to ten times its usual size during the summer months, with a substantial increase in both tourists and seasonal residents. This surge was indicative of Fevik's popularity as a sought-after vacation spot, with visitors flocking to the village for its picturesque beaches, tranquil atmosphere, and welcoming accommodations.

However, in the decades that followed, the tourism industry in Fevik experienced a notable decline. The demand for seasonal cabins and tourist accommodations diminished, in part because many of the original holiday homes were repurposed as year-round residences. Additionally, the rise of international travel and modern vacation options contributed to a shift in visitor patterns. The influx of summer tourists has since decreased significantly, and Fevik's tourism scene is now more subdued.

Today, Fevik remains a popular destination, though on a smaller scale. It is home to the Strand Hotel, which offers modern amenities for both short and long stays, and the Bagatell Camping and Course Center, which provides facilities for both campers and conference-goers. Despite the changes in tourism trends, Fevik continues to attract visitors seeking a peaceful retreat along the southern coast of Norway, albeit with a more local and quieter atmosphere compared to its bustling past.

== Notable people ==
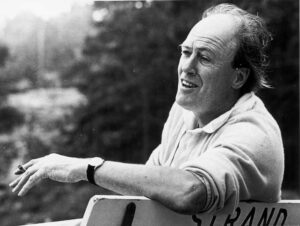
Roald Dahl at the Strand hotel in Fevik

Some notable people who have called Fevik home.

- Tryggve Gran the famed pilot and polar explorer called Fevik home and is buried at Fjære Church.
- The school pioneer Asbjørn Knutsen lived in Fevik from 1870 to 1886, and started a junior high school (a follow-up to the Almueskolen, and an alternative to the Cathedral Schools) at Birketveit with, among other things, English teaching. He started Norway's first Horticultural School at Lilleneset near Søm, Fevik.
- The pilot Tryggve Gran spent a lot of time in his vacation home at the Strand Hotel.
- Cycling star Dag Otto Lauritzen has lived in Fevik for many years.
- Roald Dahl vacationed every summer from 1920 to 1932 at the Strand Hotel, Fevik.
- Monica Knudsen, long-time soccer player on the Norwegian women's national team, raised in Fevik.
- Sølvi Olsen Meinseth, multiple Norwegian champion in 100 m, 200 m and 400 m athletics, lives in Fevik.
