= Björn Axelsson =

Swedish business theorist

Bjorn Axelsson (born July 12, 1948) is a Swedish organizational theorist and Professor of Business Administration at the Stockholm School of Economics, known for his work on industrial networks.

== Life and work ==
Born in Uppsala County, Axelsson obtained his PhD at the Uppsala University in 1981 with the thesis, entitled "Wikmanshyttans uppgång och fall: en kommentar till angreppssättet i en företagshistorisk studie" (The rise and fall of the Wikmanshyttan steel works : a commentary to the approach in a company history study).

After his graduation, Axelsson started his academic career at Uppsala University, where he managed the Uppsala Executive MBA program since the mid-1980s. In 1998, he moved to the Jönköping International Business School, where he was appointed Professor in Marketing. In 2002, he moved to the Stockholm School of Economics, where he holds the Olof A Söderberg chair in Business Administration, and became head of the D-section. From 2005 to 2009, he also held the Silf Chair in Purchasing and Supply Management at the Stockholm School of Economics.

Axelsson's research interests are in the field of "business- to- business markets both from marketing and sourcing/purchasing perspectives, but it also concerns the very functioning of such markets. The studies in both marketing and purchasing frequently address organizational issues. Themes such as effectively organizing marketing activities and creating strategic change in purchasing benefit from organization theories which therefore have become a very important scientific body of support."

== Selected publications ==
- Axelsson, Björn, and Geoff Easton, eds. Industrial networks: A new view of reality. Vol. 11. London: Routledge, 1992.
- Axelsson, Björn, and Finn Wynstra. Buying business services. John Wiley, 2002.

Articles, a selection:

- Axelsson, Björn, and Jan Johanson. "Foreign market entry-the textbook vs. the network view." (1992): 218–234. In: Industrial Networks. A New View of Reality, Routledge, London, 1992, 218–234
- Axelsson, Björn. "Corporate strategy models and networks-diverging perspectives." ACTA-UNIVERSITATIS UPSALIENSIS STUDIA OECONOMIAE NEGOTIORUM (1998): 303–322.
- Wynstra, Finn, Björn Axelsson, and Wendy van der Valk. "An application-based classification to understand buyer-supplier interaction in business services." International Journal of Service Industry Management 17.5 (2006): 474–496.
