= Jan Axelson =

American technology writer

Janet Louise Axelson
- Born: Janet Louise Axelson; 1949 (age 76–77)
- Occupations: author; conservationist
- Notable work: Axelson is the president of Friends of Cherokee Marsh; She writes and publishes technical writing and documentation under the pen name Jan Axelson

Janet Louise Axelson (born 1949) is an American author and conservationist. She writes and publishes technical literature and documentation under the pen name Jan Axelson. Much of her work relates to computer interfaces and protocols, including USB, Ethernet, serial, and parallel ports. Her books are published by her company Lakeview Research, LLC, which is based in Madison, Wisconsin. She has also written articles for Nuts and Volts, and the Wisconsin State Journal.

Axelson is the president of Friends of Cherokee Marsh, a volunteer conservation organization based in Madison, Wisconsin that protects and restores the Cherokee Marsh wetland area, an ecologically significant part of the Yahara River watershed.

== Selected publications ==
- Axelson, Jan (2015). USB Complete Fifth Edition: The Developer's Guide. Madison, Wisconsin: Lakeview Research. ISBN 978-1-931448-28-4. OCLC 993763298.
- Axelson, Jan (2011). USB Embedded Hosts: The Developer's Guide. Madison, Wisconsin: Lakeview Research. ISBN 978-1-931448-24-6. OCLC 742514334.
- Axelson, Jan (2007). Serial Port Complete: COM Ports, USB Virtual COM Ports, and Ports for Embedded Systems. Madison, Wisconsin: Lakeview Research. ISBN 978-1-931448-07-9. OCLC 154714830.
- Axelson, Jan (2006). USB Mass Storage: Designing and Programming Devices and Embedded Hosts. Madison, Wisconsin: Lakeview Research. ISBN 978-1-931448-04-8. OCLC 636392196.
- Axelson, Jan (2003). Embedded Ethernet and Internet Complete: Designing and Programming Small Devices for Networking. Madison, Wisconsin: Lakeview Research. ISBN 978-1-931448-00-0. OCLC 474716245.
- Axelson, Jan (2002). Parallel Port Complete: Programming, Interfacing, & Using the PC's Parallel Printer Port. Madison, Wisconsin: Lakeview Research. ISBN 978-0-965081-91-7. OCLC 437248533.
- Axelson, Jan (2002). The Microcontroller Idea Book: Circuits, Programs & Applications Featuring the 8052-BASIC Single-Chip Computer. Madison, Wisconsin: Lakeview Research. ISBN 978-0-965081-90-0. OCLC 437072037.
- Axelson, Jan (1993). Making Printed Circuit Boards. New York; Montréal: TAB Books. ISBN 978-0-070027-99-2. OCLC 300056131.
