= SS Britannia (1887) =

British Passenger Liner that operated between1887 and 1909

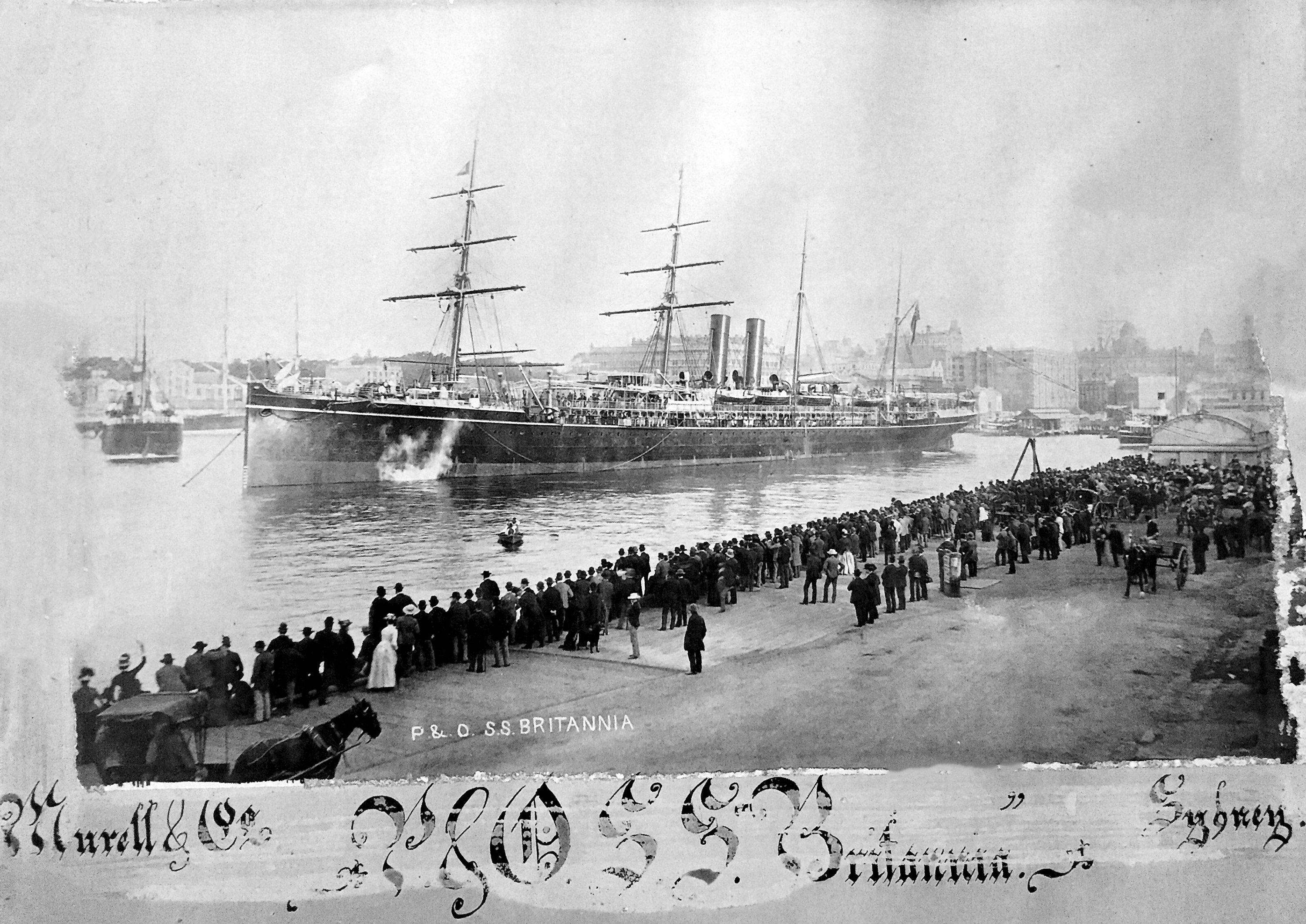
- SS Britannia in Sydney in the 1880s.

History
- Name: (United Kingdom) Britannia
- Owner: Peninsular & Oriental Steam Navigation Company
- Port of registry: (United Kingdom) Greenock, Scotland
- Route: UK/Australia, India and Far East service
- Builder: Caird & Company Greenock
- Cost: £187,278
- Yard number: 246
- Laid down: 1887
- Launched: 18 August 1887
- Completed: 11 October 1887
- Maiden voyage: 16 October 1887
- In service: 16 October 1887
- Out of service: 22 August 1909
- Fate: Scrapped 1909

General characteristics
- Type: Passenger Liner
- Tonnage: 6,525 GRT
- Length: 141.9 metres (465 ft 7 in)
- Beam: 15.8 metres (51 ft 10 in)
- Depth: 7.9 metres (25 ft 11 in)
- Installed power: Three cylinder triple expansion steam engine
- Propulsion: Screw propeller
- Speed: 16.5 knots

SS Britannia was a British Passenger Liner that was scrapped after 22 years of duty (1887–1909) at Genoa, Italy.

== Construction ==
Britannia was constructed in 1887 at the Caird & Co. shipyard in Greenock, Scotland and she was named Britannia and served from 1887 to 1909. She was launched on 18 August 1887 and was completed on 11 October 1887. The sea trials began on 15 October 1887 and after completing them the ship departed on her maiden voyage on 16 October 1887. She had one sister ship SS Victoria. She was also fitted with unsubsidised gun platforms in case of auxiliary cruiser duties.

The ship was 141.9 metres (465 ft 7 in) long, with a beam of 15.8 metres (51 ft 10 in) and a depth of 7.9 metres (25 ft 11 in). The ship was assessed at 6,525 GRT. She had a Three cylinder triple expansion steam engine driving a single screw propeller. The engine was rated at 7000 i.h.p.

== Career ==
Britannia had a successful career. On 5 November 1887 she established a new British/Indian mail record of 23 days 10 hours, at an average speed of 16 knots. Despite this, in July 1889, while traveling at 15-16 knots, she was overtaken during the night by a sailing ship which later turned out to be the Cutty Sark. She was also used as an experimental charter for six months in 1894–1895 in which she could cary 1,200 Indian troops (or 2,700 in emergency). She continued to serve as a troop ship from 1895 to 1897.

In 1904 the ship was refitted and modernised for revised mail contracts and was returned to service in 1905. In 1907 she carried Prince Fushimi Hiroyasu of Japan on a state visit to London, United Kingdom.

== Accidents ==
During her career Britannia was involved in two accidents:

- 18 October 1887: Ran Aground on Goodwin Sands for 12 hours.
- 1894: Ran aground at the Suez Canal.

== The Final Days ==
In August 1909 the ship was sold for £11,520 to Fratelli Cerruti fu Allesandra, Italy to be broken up and arrived in Genoa, Italy on 22 August 1909 together with her sistership Victoria where they were scrapped alongside each other.
