= Ole Christian Axelsen =

Norwegian businessman (1849–1917)

- Born: 1849
- Died: 1917 (aged 67–68)
- Occupation: businessperson

Ole Christian Axelsen (1849 – 1917) was a Norwegian businessperson.

Axelsen was born in 1849 in Bakke Municipality in Lister og Mandal county in Norway. He began his career in the company owned by the widow of J. G. Jansen. Later he married the widow's daughter. In 1879 he took over and expanded the operation under O. C. Axelsens Fabrikker A/S. He started a barrel factory, sawmill and watermill at Drangeid, a village north of the town of Flekkefjord. Selurafossen, the waterfall from lake Lake Selura, had provided an opportunity for development of hydroelectric power for industry.

He was also involved in merchantry, and briefly owned the historic cargo ship Skomvær. He has been called the foremost businessman in Flekkefjord around 1900. He was a member of the city council, and a board member of the local savings bank. In 1896 he was decorated with the Royal Norwegian Order of St. Olav.
