= Ananias Dekke =

Norwegian ship designer (1832–1892)

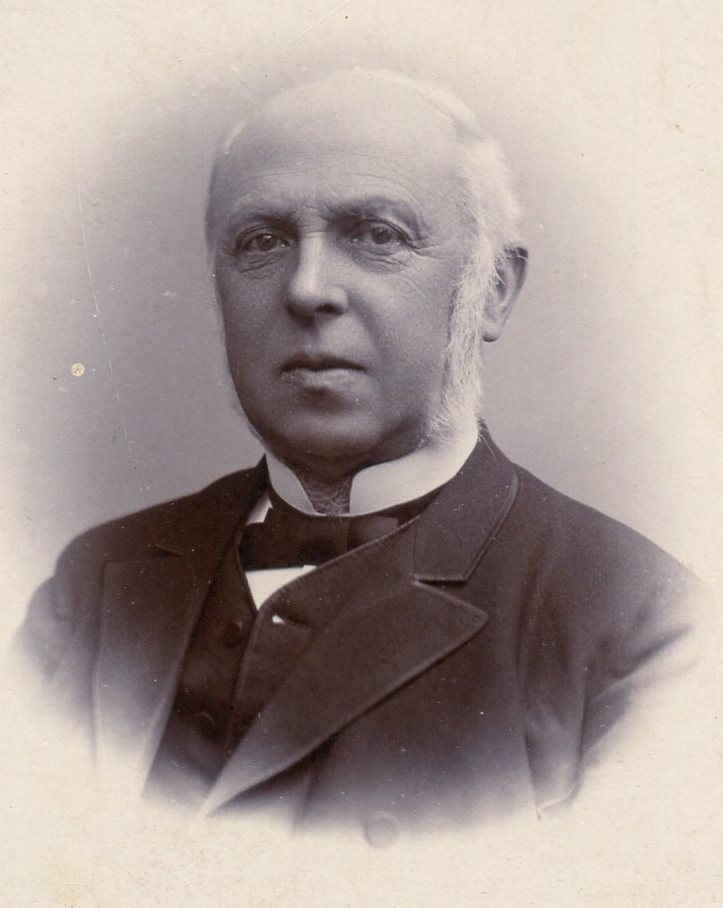
- Born: 22 July 1832; Bergen, Norway
- Died: 22 May 1892 (aged 59)
- Occupations: ship designer, ship owner, art collector and politician
- Awards: Legion of Honour; Order of St. Olav

Ananias Christopher Hansen Dekke (22 July 1832 – 22 May 1892) was a Norwegian ship designer, ship owner, art collector and politician. He was the most significant designer of wooden sailing ships in Norway in the second half of the 19th century.

== Biography ==
Dekke was born in Bergen, Norway. He was the son of Johan Mungaard Dekke (1802–74) and Christine Marie Hansen (1809–1880). His father was a master baker and he grew up in his father's bakery courtyard on Strandgaten in Bergen. In 1844, he entered the Bergen Cathedral School. In 1848, he started an apprenticeship at Georgernes Verft on the peninsula of Nordnes. In 1852, after four years of apprenticeship, he traveled to the United States to continue his education, mainly at the East Boston shipyard of Donald McKay.

Upon his return to Bergen, he bought one half in Georgernes Verft (the other half was owned by Herman Brunchorst) and from 1854 the shipyard operated under the name Brunchorst & Dekke. That same year, Jens Gran, who had also worked with McKay, joined the shipyard at Bergen. Dekke and Gran revolutionized shipbuilding in the Bergen area. Under his leadership, the shipyard built 41 schooners and 14 steamships. From 1857 he was the sole owner of the yard, except during the periods 1871-1874 and 1874–1882, when respectively Adolf Tidemand and Georg Smitt were co-owners.

He was a member of the City Council in Bergen from 1859 to 1872 and from 1877 to 1892 and set in the presidency from 1865 to 1869. He was also an alternate to the Norwegian Parliament from 1880 to 1882. He was a co-founder of the West Norway Museum of Decorative Art (Vestlandske Kunstindustrimuseum) which opened in Bergen during 1889.

== Personal life ==
Dekke was married twice. In 1859, he first married Engel Marie Rubach (1837–1863). In 1864, he married Rebekah Arloug Stoltz (1843–1930) with whom he had eight children. He was the grandfather of Arne Dekke Eide Næss and Erling Dekke Næss. He was decorated Knight of the Order of St. Olav in 1868, and Commander, Second Class in 1891. He was a Knight of the Order of the Dannebrog, and of the French Legion of Honour.
