= Tjore =

Village in Grimstad Municipality, Norway

- Village
- Interactive map of Tjore
- Coordinates: 58.3182°N 08.5184°E
- Country: Norway
- Region: Southern Norway
- County: Agder
- District: Østre Agder
- Municipality: Grimstad Municipality
- Elevation: 28 m (92 ft)
- Time zone: UTC+01:00 (CET)
  - Summer (DST): UTC+02:00 (CEST)
- Post Code: 4887 Grimstad

Tjore is a village in Grimstad Municipality in Agder county, Norway. The village is located on the southern shore of the Landvikvannet lake, just north of the European route E18 highway. The village lies about 2 kilometres (1.2 mi) to the west of the village of Østerhus, about 3.5 kilometres (2.2 mi) south of the village of Roresand, and about 5 kilometres (3.1 mi) southwest of the town of Grimstad.

== Climate ==
Climate data for Landvik 1991–2020 (6 m, average highs/lows 1998-2025, extremes 1957–2020)
Month	Jan	Feb	Mar	Apr	May	Jun	Jul	Aug	Sep	Oct	Nov	Dec	Year
Record high °C (°F)	12.8 (55.0)	18.7 (65.7)	23.1 (73.6)	24.2 (75.6)	27.7 (81.9)	31.2 (88.2)	30.8 (87.4)	32.2 (90.0)	27.3 (81.1)	21.9 (71.4)	16.8 (62.2)	13.8 (56.8)	32.2 (90.0)
Mean daily maximum °C (°F)	3.1 (37.6)	3.9 (39.0)	6.9 (44.4)	11.1 (52.0)	16 (61)	19.8 (67.6)	21.6 (70.9)	20.5 (68.9)	17.2 (63.0)	11.8 (53.2)	7.2 (45.0)	4.1 (39.4)	11.9 (53.5)
Daily mean °C (°F)	0.1 (32.2)	0.1 (32.2)	2.4 (36.3)	6.4 (43.5)	11.2 (52.2)	14.8 (58.6)	16.9 (62.4)	16.1 (61.0)	12.7 (54.9)	8 (46)	4.2 (39.6)	1.2 (34.2)	7.8 (46.1)
Mean daily minimum °C (°F)	−3 (27)	−2.6 (27.3)	−1.1 (30.0)	2.3 (36.1)	6.4 (43.5)	10.3 (50.5)	12.5 (54.5)	11.8 (53.2)	9.5 (49.1)	4.8 (40.6)	1.5 (34.7)	−1.9 (28.6)	4.2 (39.6)
Record low °C (°F)	−27.5 (−17.5)	−30.3 (−22.5)	−23.2 (−9.8)	−11.6 (11.1)	−2.6 (27.3)	0 (32)	3.5 (38.3)	3.5 (38.3)	−0.8 (30.6)	−8.1 (17.4)	−23.1 (−9.6)	−24 (−11)	−30.3 (−22.5)
Average precipitation mm (inches)	144.6 (5.69)	97 (3.8)	91.5 (3.60)	69.1 (2.72)	80.5 (3.17)	88.4 (3.48)	89.2 (3.51)	125.8 (4.95)	137.9 (5.43)	175.1 (6.89)	169.6 (6.68)	147.4 (5.80)	1,416.1 (55.72)
Average precipitation days (≥ 1.0 mm)	24	21	19	17	14	16	13	14	14	20	21	21	214
Source 1: NOAA
Source 2: eklima/met.no database
