= Prestegårdskogen =

Village in Grimstad Municipality, Norway

- Village
- Interactive map of Prestegårdskogen
- Coordinates: 58.3420°N 08.5408°E
- Country: Norway
- Region: Southern Norway
- County: Agder
- District: Østre Agder
- Municipality: Grimstad Municipality
- Elevation: 80 m (260 ft)
- Time zone: UTC+01:00 (CET)
  - Summer (DST): UTC+02:00 (CEST)
- Post Code: 4886 Grimstad

Prestegårdskogen (lit. 'Woods on the Priest's farm') is a residential village area located in Grimstad Municipality in Agder county, Norway. It sits about 1 kilometre (0.62 mi) south of the village of Roresand and about 1 kilometre (0.62 mi) east of the Landvik Church. The area is entirely made up of houses, with people working in the nearby town of Grimstad, 3 kilometres (1.9 mi) to the east.

== History ==
The area was originally the farm estate of the priest of Landvik Church (also known as the Hommedal prestegjeld). The farm was passed from priest to priest starting in 1684. This is where the priest and his family lived and farmed for centuries. The farm and houses still are in use, but fairly recently, the neighborhood called Prestegårdskogen was built in the forested areas in the eastern half of the historic estate.
