= Østerhus Church =

Church in Agder, Norway

- Østerhus arbeidskirke
- Østerhus Church
- 58.318797°N 08.562019°E
- Location: Grimstad Municipality, Agder
- Country: Norway
- Denomination: Church of Norway
- Churchmanship: Evangelical Lutheran

History
- Status: Parish church
- Founded: 1982
- Consecrated: 10 Nov 1985

Architecture
- Functional status: Active
- Architectural type: Long church
- Completed: 1982 (44 years ago)

Specifications
- Capacity: 150
- Materials: Concrete and wood

Administration
- Diocese: Agder og Telemark
- Deanery: Vest-Nedenes prosti
- Parish: Landvik
- Norwegian Cultural Heritage Site
- Type: Church
- Status: Automatically protected

Østerhus Church (Norwegian: Østerhus arbeidskirke) is a chapel of the Church of Norway in Grimstad Municipality in Agder county, Norway. It is located in the village of Østerhus. It is an annex chapel in the Landvik parish which is part of the Vest-Nedenes prosti (deanery) in the Diocese of Agder og Telemark. The small concrete and wood chapel was built in a long church style in 1980 using designs by an unknown architect. The chapel seats about 150 people.

== History ==
Østerhus Church is located in an area of Grimstad Municipality that was developed in the early 1980s. The church shares a building with a kindergarten. The kindergarten, which is located on the main floor and is run by the congregation, was ready for use in the building in 1982, while the lower floor was finished later. The new church on the lower level was consecrated for church use on 10 November 1985. The church has a baptismal font that was given as a gift by Landvik Church. Landvik Church had used it from 1879 until 1955 when it was no longer used after Landvik's old medieval baptismal font was restored and put into use again. Østerhus Church was originally run by a foundation, but its ownership was handed over to the Landvik parish council in 2002. Typically, this church holds worship services every other Sunday except during the summer months.

== See also ==
- List of churches in Agder og Telemark
