= Skiftenes =

Village in Grimstad Municipality, Norway

- Village
- Interactive map of Skiftenes
- Coordinates: 58.3944°N 08.5065°E
- Country: Norway
- Region: Southern Norway
- County: Agder
- District: Østre Agder
- Municipality: Grimstad Municipality
- Elevation: 49 m (161 ft)
- Time zone: UTC+01:00 (CET)
  - Summer (DST): UTC+02:00 (CEST)
- Post Code: 4886 Grimstad

Skiftenes is a small village in Grimstad Municipality in Agder county, Norway. The village is located along the Norwegian County Road 404, about 7 kilometres (4.3 mi) north of the village of Roresand. The lake Syndle lies just south of the village and the lake Rore lies a short distance to the east.
