= Landvik =

Landvik may refer to:

== Places ==
- Landvik Church, a church in Grimstad Municipality in Agder county, Norway
- Landvik Municipality, a former municipality in the old Aust-Agder county, Norway

== People ==
- Einar Landvik (1898-1993), a Norwegian Nordic skier
- Ingvild Landvik Isaksen (born 1989), a former Norwegian footballer
