= Håbbestad =

Village in Grimstad Municipality, Norway

- Village
- Interactive map of Håbbestad
- Coordinates: 58.39113°N 8.64124°E
- Country: Norway
- Region: Southern Norway
- County: Agder
- District: Østre Agder
- Municipality: Grimstad Municipality
- Elevation: 46 m (151 ft)
- Time zone: UTC+01:00 (CET)
  - Summer (DST): UTC+02:00 (CEST)
- Post Code: 4885 Grimstad

Håbbestad is a village in Grimstad Municipality in Agder county, Norway. The village is located about halfway between the villages of Rykene and Fevik on the north shore of the lake Temse.
