= Grimstad Municipality =

Municipality in Agder, Norway

Grimstad Municipality Grimstad kommune
- Municipality
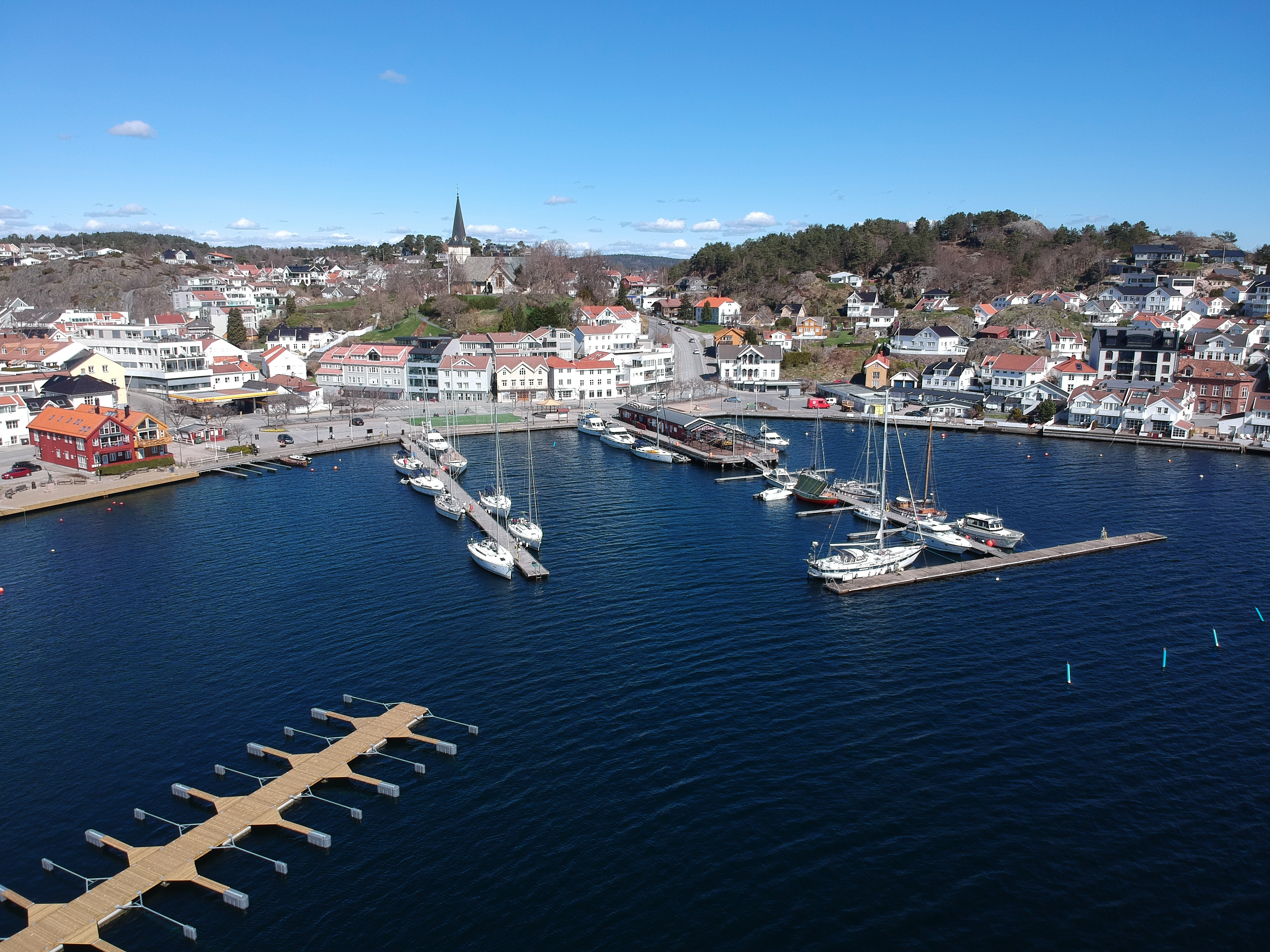
- View of Grimstad harbour

- Coat of arms

- Agder within Norway

- Grimstad within Agder
- Coordinates: 58°20′00″N 08°36′00″E
- Country: Norway
- County: Agder
- District: Sørlandet
- Established: 1 Jan 1838
  - Created as: Formannskapsdistrikt
- Administrative centre: Grimstad

Government
  - Mayor (2015): Beate Skretting (H)

Area
  - Total: 303.58 km^{2} (117.21 sq mi)
  - Land: 272.34 km^{2} (105.15 sq mi)
  - Water: 31.24 km^{2} (12.06 sq mi) 10.3%
  - Rank: #264 in Norway
- Highest elevation: 361.64 m (1,186.5 ft)

Population (2026)
  - Total: 25,569
  - Rank: #49 in Norway
  - Density: 93.9/km^{2} (243/sq mi)
  - Change (10 years): ▲ +13.4%
- Demonym(s): Grimstadmann (m); Grimstadkvinne (f); Grimstadfolk

Official language
  - Norwegian form: Bokmål
- Time zone: UTC+01:00 (CET)
  - Summer (DST): UTC+02:00 (CEST)
- ISO 3166 code: NO-4202
- Website: Official website

Grimstad (pronounced [ˈɡrɪ̀mstɑ]) is a municipality in Agder county, Norway. It belongs to the geographical region of Sørlandet. The administrative center of the municipality is the town of Grimstad. Some of the villages in Grimstad include Eide, Espenes, Fevik, Fjære, Håbbestad, Hesnes, Homborsund, Jortveit, Kroken, Nygrenda, Prestegårdskogen, Reddal, Roresand, Rønnes, Skiftenes, Tjore, Vik, and Østerhus.

The municipality is centered around the little maritime town of Grimstad which is surrounded by many small islands (Skjærgård). There is a harbor, a main street, a small market square, Grimstad Church, and a museum dedicated to the early life of Henrik Ibsen, who served as an apprentice to Grimstad's local pharmacist Reimann, from 1844 to 1847, before leaving Grimstad in 1850. Ibsen's intimate knowledge of the local people and surroundings can be seen in his poem Terje Vigen. The majority of the inhabitants live in and around the town, while the rest of the municipality is rural and heavily forested.

The 303.58-square-kilometre (117.21 sq mi) municipality is the 264th largest by area out of the 357 municipalities in Norway. Grimstad Municipality is the 49th most populous municipality in Norway with a population of 25,569. The municipality's population density is 93.9 inhabitants per square kilometre (243/sq mi) and its population has increased by 13.4% over the previous 10-year period.

== General information ==
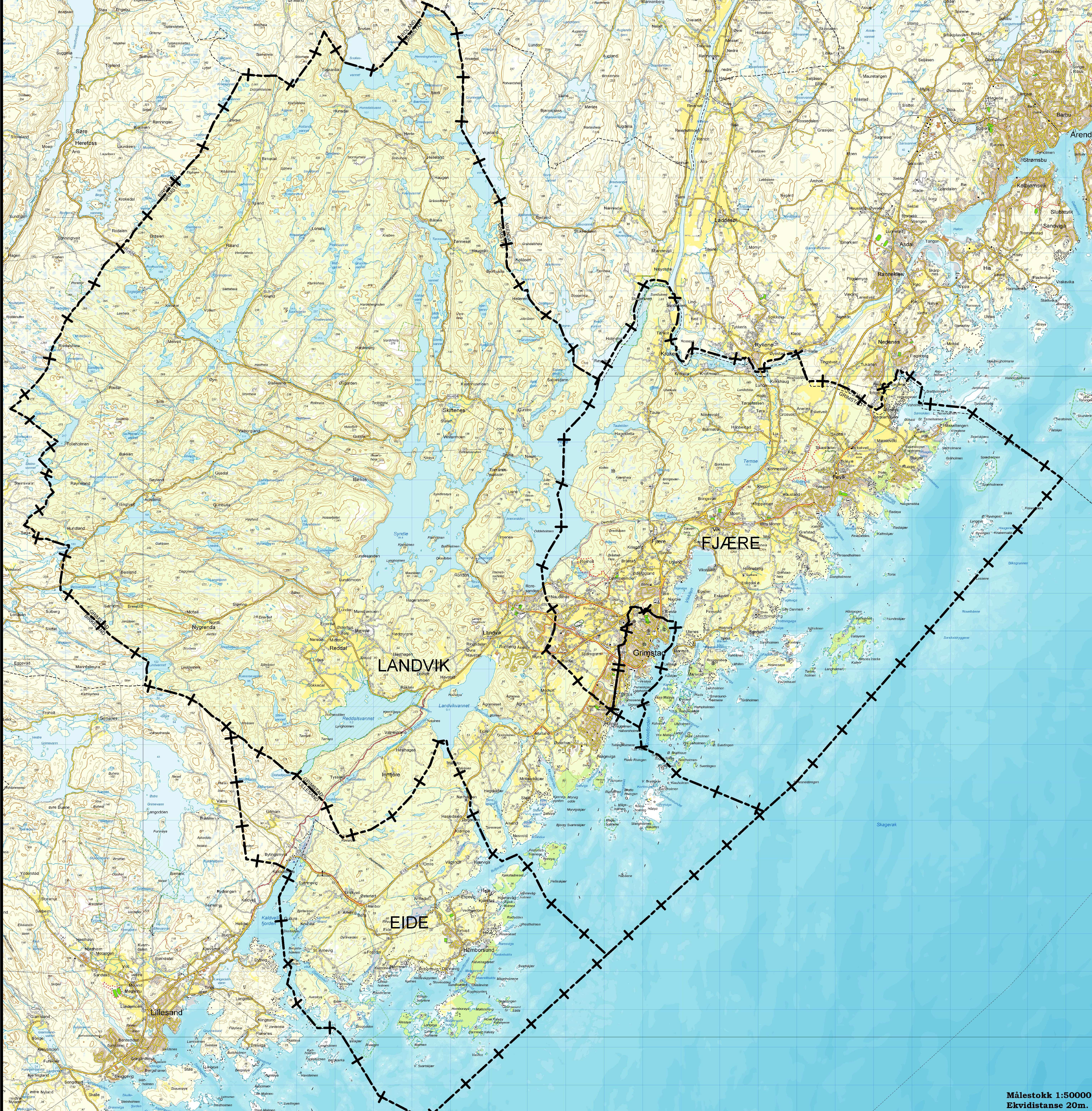
Map of the merged areas in 1971 that formed present-day Grimstad Municipality

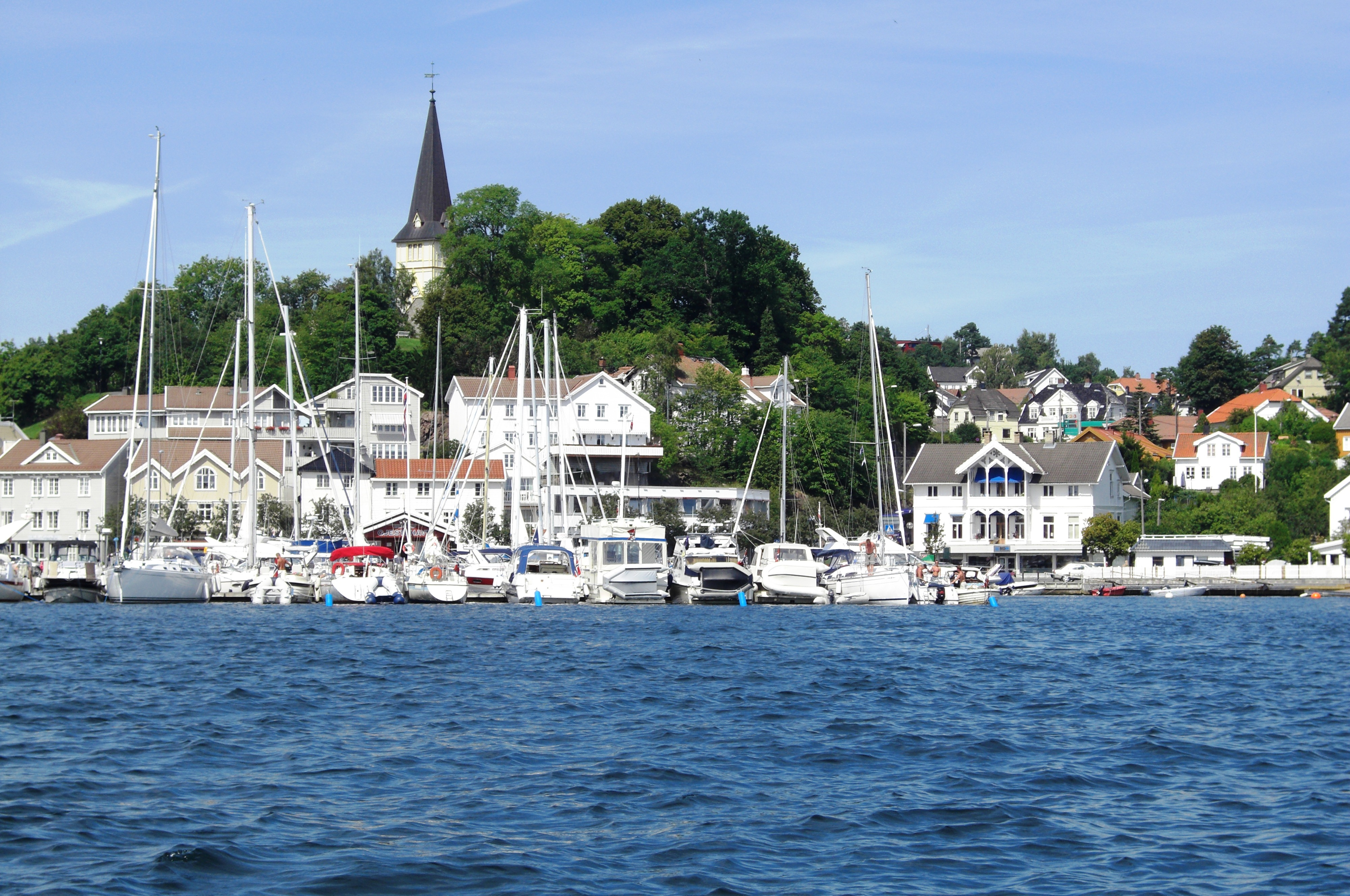
View of the city centre

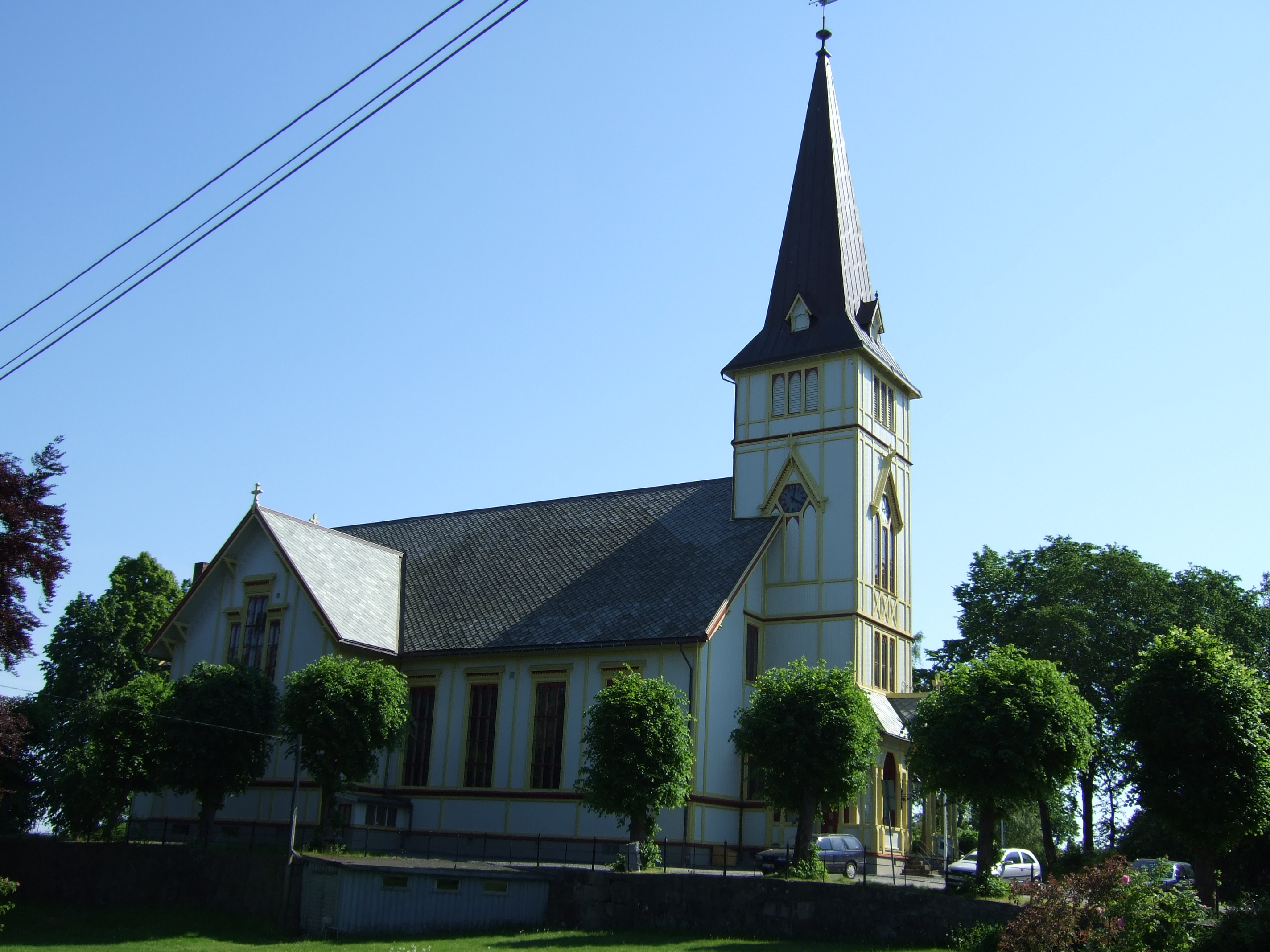
Grimstad Church

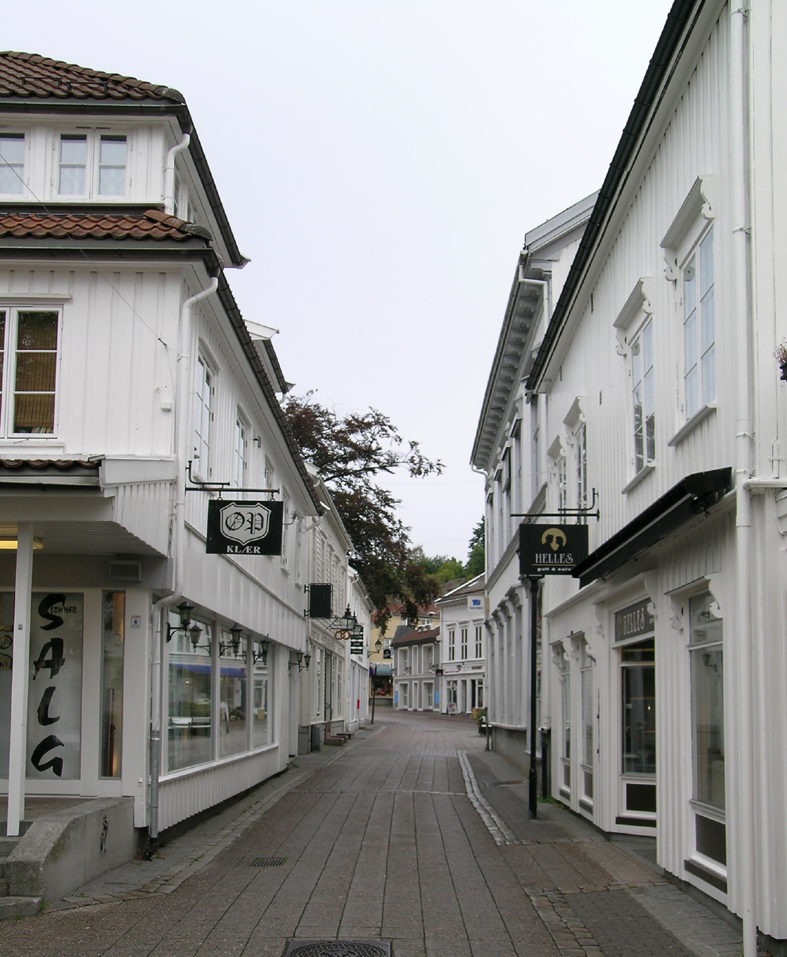
The narrow main pedestrian street Storgata in the city center.

=== Administrative history ===
The town of Grimstad was established as a municipality on 1 January 1838 (see formannskapsdistrikt law).

Over the years, the growing town of Grimstad was enlarged by annexing adjacent areas from the neighboring municipality. On 1 January 1878, part of the neighboring Fjære Municipality (population: 948) was transferred to Grimstad Municipality. Again, on 1 January 1960, another part of Fjære Municipality (population: 344) was transferred to Grimstad Municipality.

On 1 January 1971, the following areas were merged to form a significantly larger Grimstad Municipality with a total population of 11,764:

- all of Grimstad Municipality (population: 2,794)
- all of Fjære Municipality (population: 6,189)
- all of Landvik Municipality (population: 2,781)

In 2020, there were many municipal and county mergers across Norway due to the work of the Solberg cabinet. Historically, this municipality was part of the old Aust-Agder county. On 1 January 2020, the municipality became a part of the newly-formed Agder county (after Aust-Agder and Vest-Agder counties were merged).

=== Name ===
The municipality is named after the historic town of Grimstad (Old Norse: Grómstǫð). The first element is the name of after the old Grøm farm. The farm name is the combination of two items. First, the old local river name Gróa which comes from the word gróa which means "to grow" and the second part is heimr which means "home" or "abode". The last element of the name is stǫð which means "landing place" or "harbour". The town's name was originally spelled Grømstad, when Norway was part of the Kingdom of Denmark-Norway. At some point, the spelling of the name was misunderstood and became spelled as "Grimstad" during the registration of Norwegian cities and small places.

=== Coat of arms ===
The coat of arms was granted in 1899 and was based upon a seal of the city dating back to 1847. The blazon is "Azure, a brig above three barrulets wavy Or". This means the arms have a blue field (background) and the charge is a two-masted brig, a type of sailing ship, on top of three wavy lines which symbolize the ocean. The charge has a tincture of Or which means it is commonly colored yellow, but if it is made out of metal, then gold is used. The arms usually have a mural crown above the shield. The design was chosen as a symbol for the importance of fishing and shipping.

=== Churches ===
The Church of Norway has four parishes (sokn) within Grimstad Municipality. It is part of the Vest-Nedenes prosti (deanery) in the Diocese of Agder og Telemark.

Churches in Grimstad Municipality
Parish (sokn)	Church name	Location of the church	Year built
Eide	Eide Church	Eide	1795
Fjære	Fevik Church	Fevik	1976
Fjære	Fjære Church	Fjære	c. 1150
Grimstad	Grimstad Church	Grimstad	1881
Landvik	Landvik Church	Roresand	1825
Landvik	Østerhus Church	Østerhus	1980

== History ==
Grimstad lies within the boundaries of the ancient parish of Fjære Church. It is reportedly first mentioned as a harbor in the 16th century. Eight years after he was deposed, Christian II of Denmark–Norway (1513–1523) attempted to recover his kingdoms. A tempest scattered his fleet off the Norwegian coast, and on 24 October 1531, they took refuge at Grimstad. On 1 July 1532, he surrendered to his rival, King Frederick I of Denmark, in exchange for a promise of safe conduct. King Frederick failed to honor his promise and imprisoned Christian until he died.

An inn is recorded at Grimstad as early as 1607. In 1622, Grimstad became a ladested (privileged seaport) under the neighboring town of Arendal. By 1747, Grimstad was identified as a sailing community and a recognized haunt of smugglers. During the Napoleonic Wars, the British Royal Navy blockaded Grimstad; on 16 March 1811, the British frigate Venus entered Grimstad's harbour to capture four Dano-Norwegian merchantmen sheltering there. Royal Marines from Venus captured the sloop Frau Maria but were eventually forced to abandoned her and row back to Venus.

John Frederik Classen, who owned the Frolands Værk (an ironworks), obtained concessions to export and import through Grimstad and bypass Arendal with its customs dues. Grimstad was awarded kjøpstad status in 1816. The Nørholm farm was the home of Knut Hamsun in the early 20th century.

== Government ==
Grimstad Municipality is responsible for primary education (through 10th grade), outpatient health services, senior citizen services, welfare and other social services, zoning, economic development, and municipal roads and utilities. The municipality is governed by a municipal council of directly elected representatives. The mayor is indirectly elected by a vote of the municipal council. The municipality is under the jurisdiction of the Agder District Court and the Agder Court of Appeal.

=== Municipal council ===
The municipal council (Kommunestyre) of Grimstad Municipality is made up of 35 representatives that are elected to four-year terms. The tables below show the current and historical composition of the council by political party.

Grimstad kommunestyre 2023–2027
Party name (in Norwegian)	Number of representatives
Labour Party (Arbeiderpartiet)	6
Progress Party (Fremskrittspartiet)	4
Green Party (Miljøpartiet De Grønne)	1
Conservative Party (Høyre)	8
Industry and Business Party (Industri‑ og Næringspartiet)	2
The Conservatives (Konservativt)	1
Christian Democratic Party (Kristelig Folkeparti)	5
Red Party (Rødt)	1
Centre Party (Senterpartiet)	2
Socialist Left Party (Sosialistisk Venstreparti)	3
Liberal Party (Venstre)	2
Total number of members:	35

Grimstad kommunestyre 2019–2023
Party name (in Norwegian)	Number of representatives
Labour Party (Arbeiderpartiet)	7
Progress Party (Fremskrittspartiet)	4
Green Party (Miljøpartiet De Grønne)	2
Conservative Party (Høyre)	7
Christian Democratic Party (Kristelig Folkeparti)	6
Red Party (Rødt)	1
Centre Party (Senterpartiet)	3
Socialist Left Party (Sosialistisk Venstreparti)	2
Liberal Party (Venstre)	3
Total number of members:	35

Grimstad kommunestyre 2015–2019
Party name (in Norwegian)	Number of representatives
Labour Party (Arbeiderpartiet)	9
Progress Party (Fremskrittspartiet)	6
Green Party (Miljøpartiet De Grønne)	1
Conservative Party (Høyre)	6
Christian Democratic Party (Kristelig Folkeparti)	7
Centre Party (Senterpartiet)	2
Socialist Left Party (Sosialistisk Venstreparti)	1
Liberal Party (Venstre)	3
Total number of members:	35

Grimstad kommunestyre 2011–2015
Party name (in Norwegian)	Number of representatives
Labour Party (Arbeiderpartiet)	9
Progress Party (Fremskrittspartiet)	6
Conservative Party (Høyre)	5
Christian Democratic Party (Kristelig Folkeparti)	5
Centre Party (Senterpartiet)	2
Socialist Left Party (Sosialistisk Venstreparti)	1
Liberal Party (Venstre)	7
Total number of members:	35

Grimstad kommunestyre 2007–2011
Party name (in Norwegian)	Number of representatives
Labour Party (Arbeiderpartiet)	6
Progress Party (Fremskrittspartiet)	8
Conservative Party (Høyre)	5
Christian Democratic Party (Kristelig Folkeparti)	6
Centre Party (Senterpartiet)	2
Socialist Left Party (Sosialistisk Venstreparti)	2
Liberal Party (Venstre)	6
Total number of members:	35

Grimstad kommunestyre 2003–2007
Party name (in Norwegian)	Number of representatives
Labour Party (Arbeiderpartiet)	6
Progress Party (Fremskrittspartiet)	8
Conservative Party (Høyre)	7
Christian Democratic Party (Kristelig Folkeparti)	5
Centre Party (Senterpartiet)	3
Socialist Left Party (Sosialistisk Venstreparti)	3
Liberal Party (Venstre)	3
Total number of members:	35

Grimstad kommunestyre 1999–2003
Party name (in Norwegian)	Number of representatives
Labour Party (Arbeiderpartiet)	15
Progress Party (Fremskrittspartiet)	6
Conservative Party (Høyre)	8
Christian Democratic Party (Kristelig Folkeparti)	9
Centre Party (Senterpartiet)	3
Socialist Left Party (Sosialistisk Venstreparti)	2
Liberal Party (Venstre)	2
Total number of members:	45

Grimstad kommunestyre 1995–1999
Party name (in Norwegian)	Number of representatives
Labour Party (Arbeiderpartiet)	11
Progress Party (Fremskrittspartiet)	4
Conservative Party (Høyre)	10
Christian Democratic Party (Kristelig Folkeparti)	9
Pensioners' Party (Pensjonistpartiet)	1
Centre Party (Senterpartiet)	6
Socialist Left Party (Sosialistisk Venstreparti)	2
Liberal Party (Venstre)	2
Total number of members:	45

Grimstad kommunestyre 1991–1995
Party name (in Norwegian)	Number of representatives
Labour Party (Arbeiderpartiet)	9
Progress Party (Fremskrittspartiet)	4
Conservative Party (Høyre)	9
Christian Democratic Party (Kristelig Folkeparti)	9
Pensioners' Party (Pensjonistpartiet)	4
Centre Party (Senterpartiet)	5
Socialist Left Party (Sosialistisk Venstreparti)	3
Liberal Party (Venstre)	2
Total number of members:	45

Grimstad kommunestyre 1987–1991
Party name (in Norwegian)	Number of representatives
Labour Party (Arbeiderpartiet)	12
Progress Party (Fremskrittspartiet)	5
Conservative Party (Høyre)	12
Christian Democratic Party (Kristelig Folkeparti)	9
Centre Party (Senterpartiet)	3
Socialist Left Party (Sosialistisk Venstreparti)	1
Joint list of the Liberal Party (Venstre) and Liberal People's Party (Liberale Folkepartiet)	3
Total number of members:	45

Grimstad kommunestyre 1983–1987
Party name (in Norwegian)	Number of representatives
Labour Party (Arbeiderpartiet)	12
Progress Party (Fremskrittspartiet)	4
Conservative Party (Høyre)	14
Christian Democratic Party (Kristelig Folkeparti)	9
Liberal People's Party (Liberale Folkepartiet)	1
Centre Party (Senterpartiet)	3
Socialist Left Party (Sosialistisk Venstreparti)	1
Liberal Party (Venstre)	1
Total number of members:	45

Grimstad kommunestyre 1979–1983
Party name (in Norwegian)	Number of representatives
Labour Party (Arbeiderpartiet)	11
Progress Party (Fremskrittspartiet)	2
Conservative Party (Høyre)	15
Christian Democratic Party (Kristelig Folkeparti)	11
New People's Party (Nye Folkepartiet)	1
Centre Party (Senterpartiet)	3
Liberal Party (Venstre)	2
Total number of members:	45

Grimstad kommunestyre 1975–1979
Party name (in Norwegian)	Number of representatives
Labour Party (Arbeiderpartiet)	12
Conservative Party (Høyre)	12
Christian Democratic Party (Kristelig Folkeparti)	12
New People's Party (Nye Folkepartiet)	1
Centre Party (Senterpartiet)	6
Socialist Left Party (Sosialistisk Venstreparti)	1
Liberal Party (Venstre)	1
Total number of members:	45

Grimstad kommunestyre 1971–1975
Party name (in Norwegian)	Number of representatives
Labour Party (Arbeiderpartiet)	17
Conservative Party (Høyre)	9
Christian Democratic Party (Kristelig Folkeparti)	9
Centre Party (Senterpartiet)	6
Liberal Party (Venstre)	4
Total number of members:	45

Grimstad bystyre 1967–1971
Party name (in Norwegian)	Number of representatives
Labour Party (Arbeiderpartiet)	7
Conservative Party (Høyre)	8
Christian Democratic Party (Kristelig Folkeparti)	4
Liberal Party (Venstre)	2
Total number of members:	21

Grimstad bystyre 1963–1967
Party name (in Norwegian)	Number of representatives
Labour Party (Arbeiderpartiet)	7
Conservative Party (Høyre)	9
Christian Democratic Party (Kristelig Folkeparti)	5
Total number of members:	21

Grimstad bystyre 1959–1963
Party name (in Norwegian)	Number of representatives
Labour Party (Arbeiderpartiet)	6
Conservative Party (Høyre)	9
Christian Democratic Party (Kristelig Folkeparti)	4
Liberal Party (Venstre)	2
Total number of members:	21

Grimstad bystyre 1955–1959
Party name (in Norwegian)	Number of representatives
Labour Party (Arbeiderpartiet)	7
Conservative Party (Høyre)	8
Christian Democratic Party (Kristelig Folkeparti)	4
Liberal Party (Venstre)	2
Total number of members:	21

Grimstad bystyre 1951–1955
Party name (in Norwegian)	Number of representatives
Labour Party (Arbeiderpartiet)	5
Conservative Party (Høyre)	7
Christian Democratic Party (Kristelig Folkeparti)	6
Liberal Party (Venstre)	2
Total number of members:	20

Grimstad bystyre 1947–1951
Party name (in Norwegian)	Number of representatives
Labour Party (Arbeiderpartiet)	5
Conservative Party (Høyre)	8
Christian Democratic Party (Kristelig Folkeparti)	5
Liberal Party (Venstre)	2
Total number of members:	20

Grimstad bystyre 1945–1947
Party name (in Norwegian)	Number of representatives
Labour Party (Arbeiderpartiet)	5
Conservative Party (Høyre)	8
Joint list of the Liberal Party (Venstre) and the Radical People's Party (Radikale Folkepartiet)	1
Local List(s) (Lokale lister)	6
Total number of members:	20

Grimstad bystyre 1937–1941*
Party name (in Norwegian)	Number of representatives
Labour Party (Arbeiderpartiet)	3
Temperance Party (Avholdspartiet)	6
Liberal Party (Venstre)	3
Joint List(s) of Non-Socialist Parties (Borgerlige Felleslister)	8
Total number of members:	20
Note: Due to the German occupation of Norway during World War II, no elections were held for new municipal councils until after the war ended in 1945.

Grimstad bystyre 1934–1937
Party name (in Norwegian)	Number of representatives
Labour Party (Arbeiderpartiet)	3
Temperance Party (Avholdspartiet)	4
Liberal Party (Venstre)	3
Joint List(s) of Non-Socialist Parties (Borgerlige Felleslister)	10
Total number of members:	20

=== Mayors ===
The mayor (Norwegian: ordfører) of Grimstad Municipality is the political leader of the municipality and the chairperson of the municipal council. The following people have held this position:

- 1838–1841: Bendix Ebbell
- 1841–1842: Dr. Christian Fredrik Bonnevie
- 1843–1843: Christian Holst
- 1844–1844: Mathias Gundersen
- 1845–1845: Christian Holst
- 1846–1846: Mathias Gundersen
- 1847–1848: Rev. Axel Christian Pharo
- 1848–1849: John Collett Falsen
- 1849–1850: Fredrik Crawfurd
- 1851–1851: Morten Smith Petersen
- 1852–1852: Charles Crawfurd
- 1853–1853: Morten Smith Petersen
- 1854–1854: Christian Holst
- 1855–1855: Morten Smith Petersen
- 1856–1856: Dr. Hans Frisak
- 1856–1857: Morten Smith Petersen
- 1857–1857: Morten Smith Tveten
- 1858–1859: Morten Smith Petersen
- 1859–1859: Morten Smith Tveten
- 1860–1860: Dr. Hans Frisak
- 1860–1862: Morten Smith Petersen
- 1863–1864: Dr. Hans Frisak
- 1865–1866: Henning J. Bie
- 1867–1867: Morten Smith Petersen
- 1867–1867: Aanon Aanenson Frivold
- 1868–1868: Morten Smith Petersen
- 1868–1872: Dr. Hans Frisak
- 1873–1874: Fredrik Crawfurd
- 1875–1878: Dr. Hans Frisak
- 1879–1901: Fredrik Smith Petersen
- 1902–1907: Bernt Einersen
- 1908–1910: Dr. Peter Berg
- 1911–1914: Bernt Einersen
- 1915–1916: Hans P. Hansen
- 1917–1917: Alfred Johnsen
- 1918–1919: Johannes Alfred Gundersen
- 1920–1920: Daniel Gundersen (H)
- 1921–1922: Ole Thomassen Tønnevold (H)
- 1923–1925: Peder Bjørn Einersen (H)
- 1926–1928: Daniel Gundersen (H)
- 1929–1931: Peder Bjørn Einersen (H)
- 1932–1934: Carsten Assev (H)
- 1935–1936: Thomas Olsen Tønnevold (H)
- 1937–1937: Mons Fuhr (H)
- 1938–1938: Gunnar E. Gundersen (KrF)|
- 1939–1945: Mons Fuhr (H)
- 1945–1945: Gunnar E. Gundersen (KrF)|
- 1945–1945: Dr. Leif B. Smith (V)
- 1946–1947: Trygve Skretting (H)
- 1948–1948: Gunnar E. Gundersen (KrF)|
- 1949–1949: Trygve Skretting (H)
- 1950–1950: Gunnar E. Gundersen (KrF)|
- 1951–1961: Trygve Skretting (H)
- 1962–1963: Hans Stifoss Hanssen
- 1964–1970: Trygve Skretting (H)
- 1970–1971: Johan Jørgen Ugland (H)
- 1972–1975: Gudmund Hytten (H)
- 1976–1977: Trygve Skretting (H)
- 1978–1981: Reidar Aslaksen (KrF)
- 1982–1983: Gunnar Edvard Gundersen (H)
- 1984–1985: Reidar Aslaksen (KrF)
- 1986–1987: Hallstein Gauslaa (H)
- 1988–1989: Jon Sørland (KrF)
- 1990–1991: Bent Sætra (H)
- 1992–1995: Oddvar Skaiaa (KrF)
- 1995–2003: Per Svenningsen (Ap)
- 2003–2007: Svein Harberg (H)
- 2007–2015: Hans Antonsen (V)
- 2015–2019: Kjetil Glimsdal (KrF)
- 2019–present: Beate Skretting (H)

== Education ==
Grimstad is home to Drottningborg, a private Lutheran boarding preparatory school. It is also the location of the Bibelskolen in Grimstad (BiG), a private Lutheran bible school. The University of Agder has its faculty of engineering seated here. A student dorm called "Grøm" is also in Grimstad.

== Geography ==
Grimstad is a coastal municipality in Agder county bordering on the Skagerrak. The municipality is bordered by Arendal Municipality in the east, Froland Municipality and Birkenes Municipality in the north, and Lillesand Municipality in the west. The lakes Syndle and Rore are found in the northern part of the municipality. Landvikvannet and Reddalsvannet lakes are found in the southern part of the municipality, near the village of Reddal. The rivers Nidelva and Tovdalselva run through parts of the municipality. The Rivingen Lighthouse and Homborsund Lighthouse both sit on small islands just off the coast. The highest point in the municipality is the 361.64-metre (1,186.5 ft) tall mountain Dobbedalshei in the northern part of the municipality.

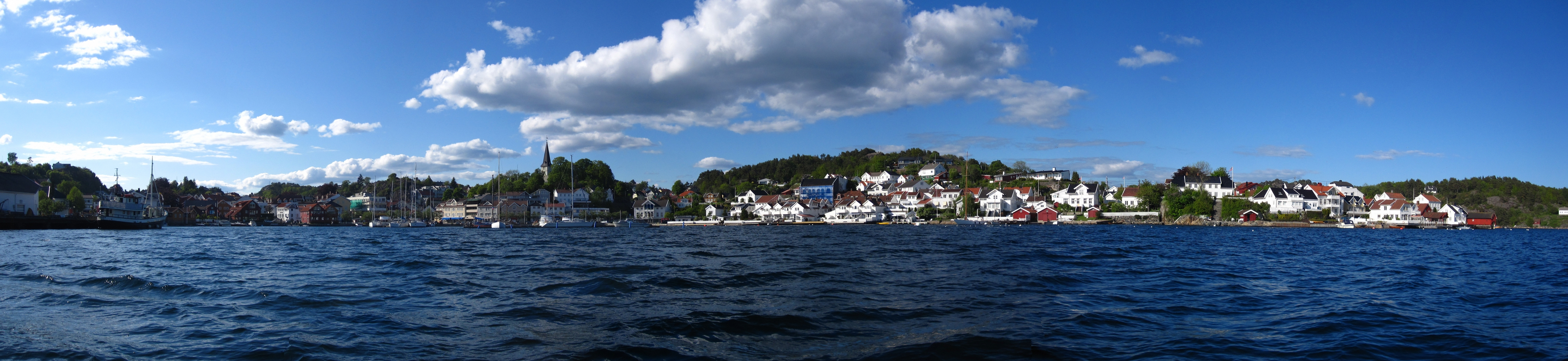
Panorama of Grimstad harbour.

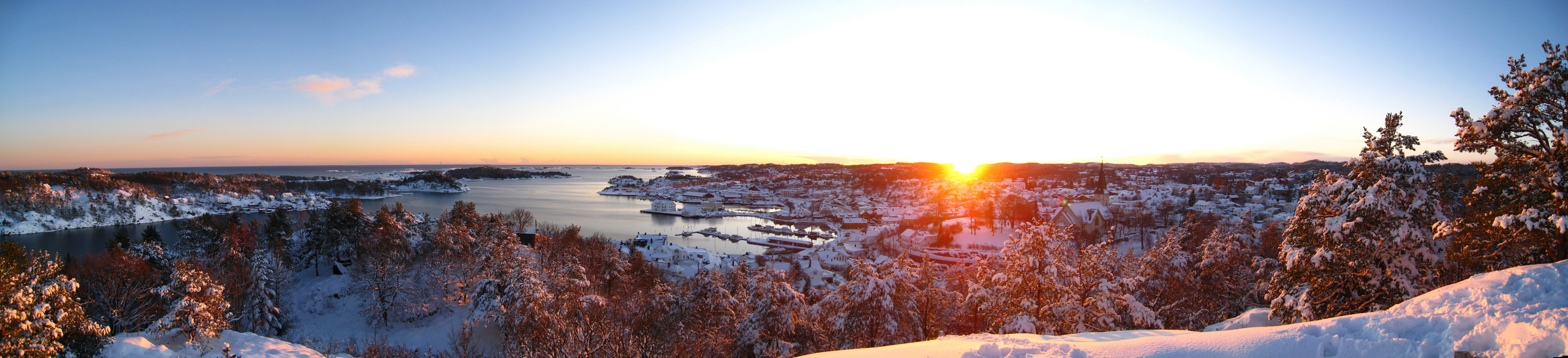
Panorama of Grimstad from Binabben look-out point.

=== Climate ===
Grimstad is the sunniest town in Norway. The coastal areas of the municipality have a temperate oceanic climate (Köppen: Cfb), with cool to cold winters and mild summers. The inner parts have a warm-summer humid continental climate (Köppen: Dfb) with averages under 0 °C (32 °F) in winter. Autumn and early winter is the wettest period and April to July is the driest. The all-time high temperature 32.2 °C (90.0 °F) was 11 August 1975; the all-time low is −30.3 °C (−22.5 °F) recorded 8 February 1966. The March record high 23.1 °C (73.6 °F) recorded 27 March 2012 was new national heat record for March. Most of the record lows are old; 8 of 12 record lows from before 1970 (November 2021). In February and March 1970 a snow depth of 172 centimetres (68 in) was recorded at Landvik. In recent times, snow usually melts fast along the coast, but the right weather setup can sometimes give large snowfalls. The weather station in Landvik, 5 kilometres (3.1 mi) inland from the town of Grimstad, has been recording since 1957.

Climate data for Landvik 1991–2020 (6 m, average highs/lows 1998-2025, extremes 1957–2020)
Month	Jan	Feb	Mar	Apr	May	Jun	Jul	Aug	Sep	Oct	Nov	Dec	Year
Record high °C (°F)	12.8 (55.0)	18.7 (65.7)	23.1 (73.6)	24.2 (75.6)	27.7 (81.9)	31.2 (88.2)	30.8 (87.4)	32.2 (90.0)	27.3 (81.1)	21.9 (71.4)	16.8 (62.2)	13.8 (56.8)	32.2 (90.0)
Mean daily maximum °C (°F)	3.1 (37.6)	3.9 (39.0)	6.9 (44.4)	11.1 (52.0)	16 (61)	19.8 (67.6)	21.6 (70.9)	20.5 (68.9)	17.2 (63.0)	11.8 (53.2)	7.2 (45.0)	4.1 (39.4)	11.9 (53.5)
Daily mean °C (°F)	0.1 (32.2)	0.1 (32.2)	2.4 (36.3)	6.4 (43.5)	11.2 (52.2)	14.8 (58.6)	16.9 (62.4)	16.1 (61.0)	12.7 (54.9)	8 (46)	4.2 (39.6)	1.2 (34.2)	7.8 (46.1)
Mean daily minimum °C (°F)	−3 (27)	−2.6 (27.3)	−1.1 (30.0)	2.3 (36.1)	6.4 (43.5)	10.3 (50.5)	12.5 (54.5)	11.8 (53.2)	9.5 (49.1)	4.8 (40.6)	1.5 (34.7)	−1.9 (28.6)	4.2 (39.6)
Record low °C (°F)	−27.5 (−17.5)	−30.3 (−22.5)	−23.2 (−9.8)	−11.6 (11.1)	−2.6 (27.3)	0 (32)	3.5 (38.3)	3.5 (38.3)	−0.8 (30.6)	−8.1 (17.4)	−23.1 (−9.6)	−24 (−11)	−30.3 (−22.5)
Average precipitation mm (inches)	144.6 (5.69)	97 (3.8)	91.5 (3.60)	69.1 (2.72)	80.5 (3.17)	88.4 (3.48)	89.2 (3.51)	125.8 (4.95)	137.9 (5.43)	175.1 (6.89)	169.6 (6.68)	147.4 (5.80)	1,416.1 (55.72)
Average precipitation days (≥ 1.0 mm)	24	21	19	17	14	16	13	14	14	20	21	21	214
Source 1: NOAA
Source 2: eklima/met.no database

== Attractions ==
The Maritime Museum, the comprehensive City Museum and the Norwegian Horticultural Museum, are all popular among tourists, as are the wealth of exhibitions and concerts that the town hosts. The town is also a popular destination for summer vacationers, and supports a robust shopping milieu during the Christmas season.

During summer, Grimstad plays host to the Norwegian Short Film Festival, which attracts film enthusiasts from far and near. Another popular attraction is the Agder Teater at Fjæreheia, an open-air stage located in a disused stone quarry. Shopping is also available in Oddensenteret along the harbour. (The view from Oddensenteret is seen in the panorama photo above.)

The Homborsund Lighthouse is located within the municipality. Grimstad is also home to the Nøgne Ø brewery.

== Sports ==
The 1997 World Orienteering Championships were held in Grimstad. The FK Jerv is the most important football club, and plays for first time at the top division in 2022.

== Notable people ==
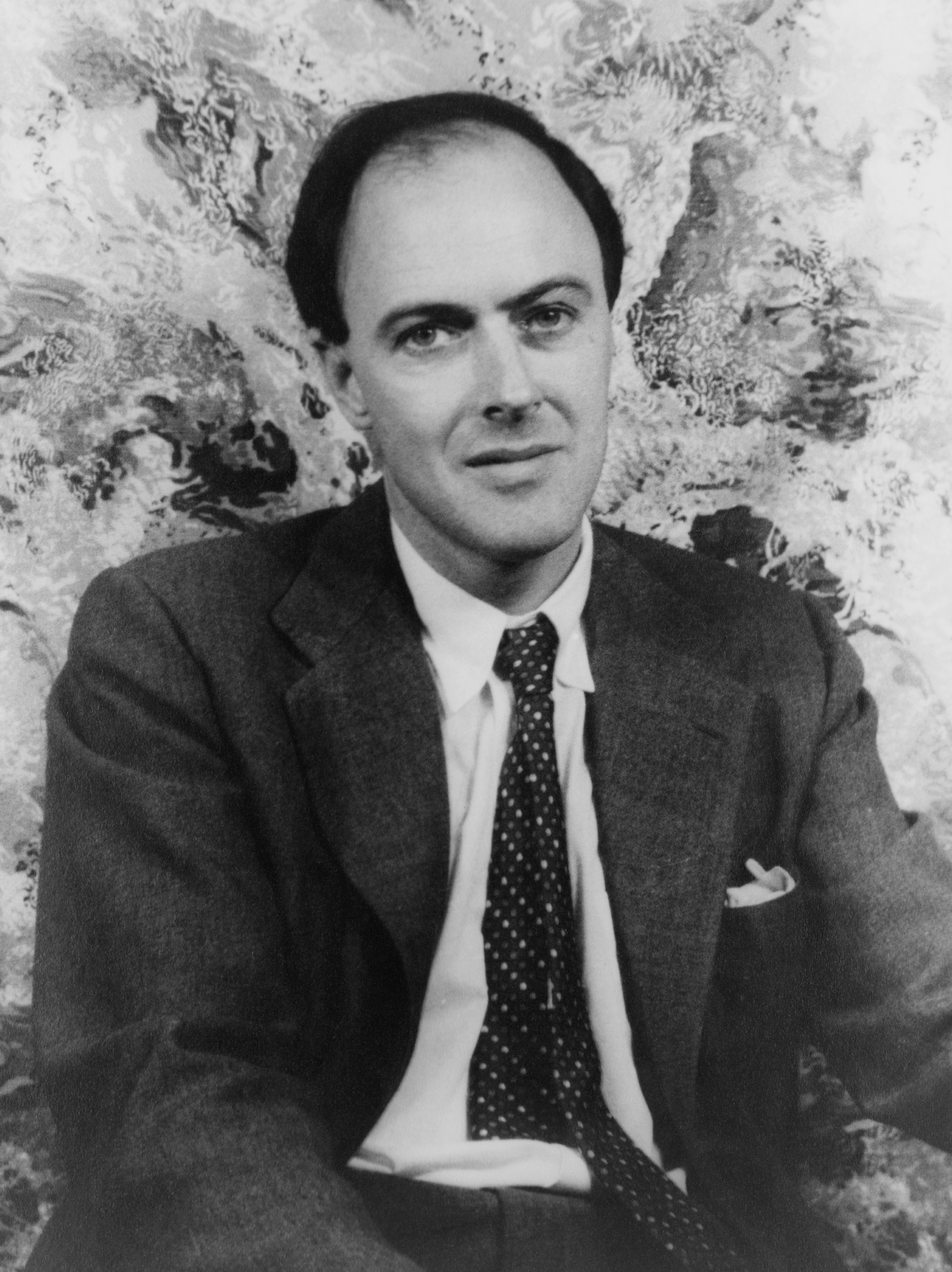
Roald Dahl, 1954

=== The arts ===
- Henrik Ibsen (1828–1906), a playwright who wrote his first drama, Catalina in Grimstad in 1848/49
- Andreas Isachsen (1829–1903), an actor and playwright
- Knut Hamsun (1859–1952), a Nobel lauriate author who lived in Norholm from 1918
- Clara Thue Ebbell (1880–1971), an author of young adult fiction
- Roald Dahl (1916–1990), an author who visited his grandparents and summered at the Strand Hotel in Fevik in Grimstad
- Lillian Müller (born 1951), a model and actress
- Even Benestad (born 1974), a documentary film director
- Kjetil Mørland (born 1980), a singer and songwriter who competed in the Eurovision Song Contest 2015

=== Public service and public thought ===
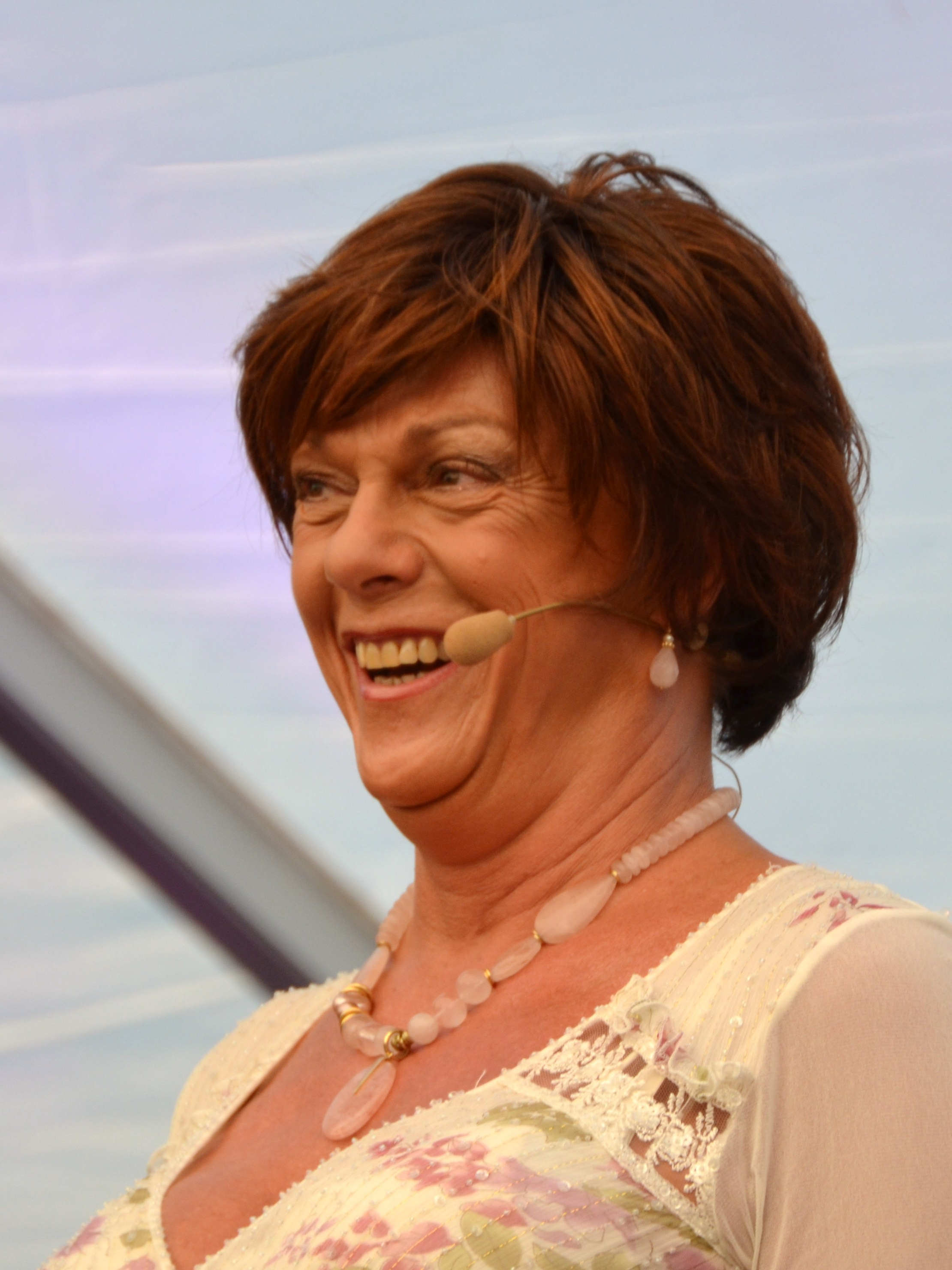
Esben Esther Pirelli Benestad, 2011

- Bent Salvesen (1787–1820), a ship's captaina, lieutenant in the Royal Danish Navy, and privateer
- Elisabeth Helmer (1854 – after 1912), a professional photographer and women's rights activist
- Sverre Hassel (1876–1928), a polar explorer who accompanied Roald Amundsen to the South Pole
- Marius Nygaard Smith-Petersen (1886–1953), an American physician and orthopaedic surgeon
- Tryggve Gran (1889–1980), a polar explorer, flight pioneer, and author
- Christopher Grigson (1926–2001), a developer of the scanning electron microscope
- Thor Tjøntveit (1936–2017), a Norwegian-American aviator and convicted fraudster
- Esben Esther Pirelli Benestad (born 1949), a physician, sexologist, and prominent trans person
- Gunhild Vehusheia (born 1975), a lawyer and women's rights leader

=== Sport ===
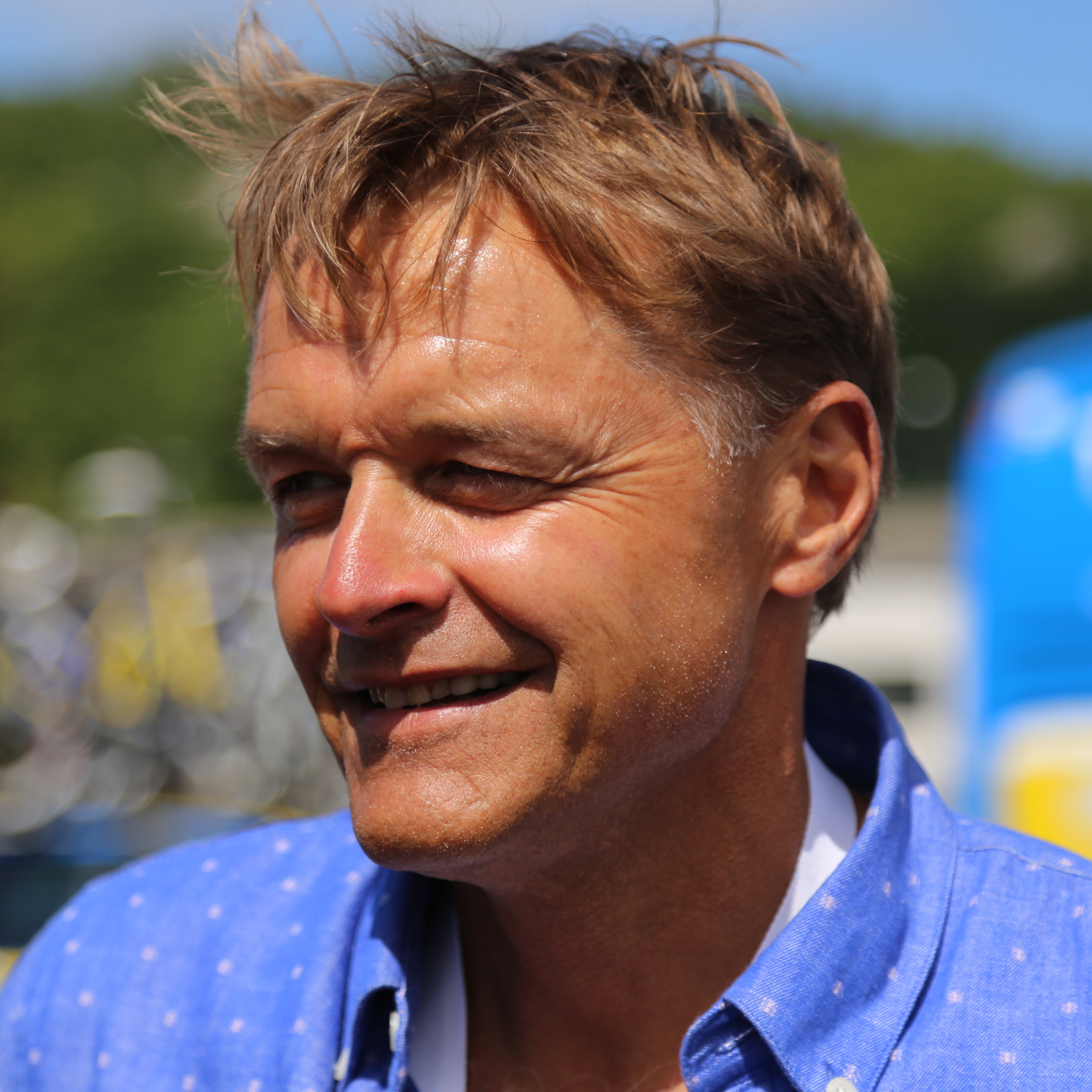
Dag Otto Lauritzen, 2014

- Jacob Gundersen (1875–1968), a Norwegian-American freestyle wrestler and silver medallist (for Norway) at the 1908 Summer Olympics
- Dag Otto Lauritzen (born 1956), a road bicycle racer, bronze medallist at the 1984 Summer Olympics, and the first Norwegian to win a stage in the Tour de France in 1987
- Thor Hushovd (born 1978), a road bicycle racer, 2010 World Road Race Champion, and the first Norwegian to wear the yellow jersey and win the green jersey in the Tour de France

== Twin towns – sister cities ==
Grimstad has sister city agreements with the following places:

- Asikkala, Finland
- Billund, Denmark
- Köping, Sweden
