= Grimstad Bible School =

Coordinates: 58.3118°N 8.5661°E

- Norwegian: Bibelskolen i Grimstad
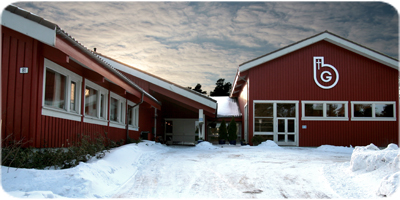

Information
- Principal: Anne Mari Vadset
- Capacity: c. 100
- Website: bibelskolen.no

Grimstad Bible School (also known as Bibelskolen i Grimstad or BiG) is located in Grimstad, Norway, and is owned by Normisjon. The school was founded by Det norske lutherske Indremisjonsforbundet (the Norwegian Lutheran Inner Mission Association). The Bible School is marketed with the slogan "A year to clarify and prepare" and it has a curriculum focusing on Bible studies, personal growth and contemporary challenges.

The school has room for about 100 students in addition to second-year students.

== Courses of study ==
Student at BiG can choose from five courses of study: Music, Veritas, Growth, Sports & Outdoors, and World Wide Walk. Course-specific classes make up about half of a regular school week; the other half is composed of courses related to Bible study. In addition to regular teaching, a student at BiG will take part in several trips. Some of these are common, and some are course-specific. E.g. after the first month at school, all students travel to Israel.

== TT ==
For those who, often after a first year at BiG, choose to work for one year as a volunteer in a congregation, organization or otherwise, there is a second-year course. It consists of six weeks of teaching, several essays, and a school trip.

== Principals ==
- Kurt Hjemdal
- Svein Lilleaasen
- Kjetil Glimsdal
- Kjetil Vestel Haga
- Ketil Jensen
- Anne Mari Vadset (current)
