= Jortveit =

Village in Grimstad Municipality, Norway

- Village
- Interactive map of Jortveit
- Coordinates: 58.2689°N 08.5084°E
- Country: Norway
- Region: Southern Norway
- County: Agder
- District: Østre Agder
- Municipality: Grimstad Municipality

Area
  - Total: 0.64 km^{2} (0.25 sq mi)
- Elevation: 21 m (69 ft)

Population (2025)
  - Total: 679
  - Density: 1,061/km^{2} (2,750/sq mi)
- Time zone: UTC+01:00 (CET)
  - Summer (DST): UTC+02:00 (CEST)
- Post Code: 4888 Homborsund

Jortveit is a village in Grimstad Municipality in Agder county, Norway. The village is located in the Homborsund area in southern Grimstad (prior to 1962, the area was part of Eide Municipality). The village of Homborsund lies just south of Jortveit and the Eide Church lies about 2 kilometres (1.2 mi) west of the village.

The 0.64-square-kilometre (160-acre) village area (including neighboring Homborsund) has a population (2025) of 679 and a population density of 1,061 inhabitants per square kilometre (2,750/sq mi).
