= Henrik Thrap-Meyer =

Norwegian architect (1833–1910)

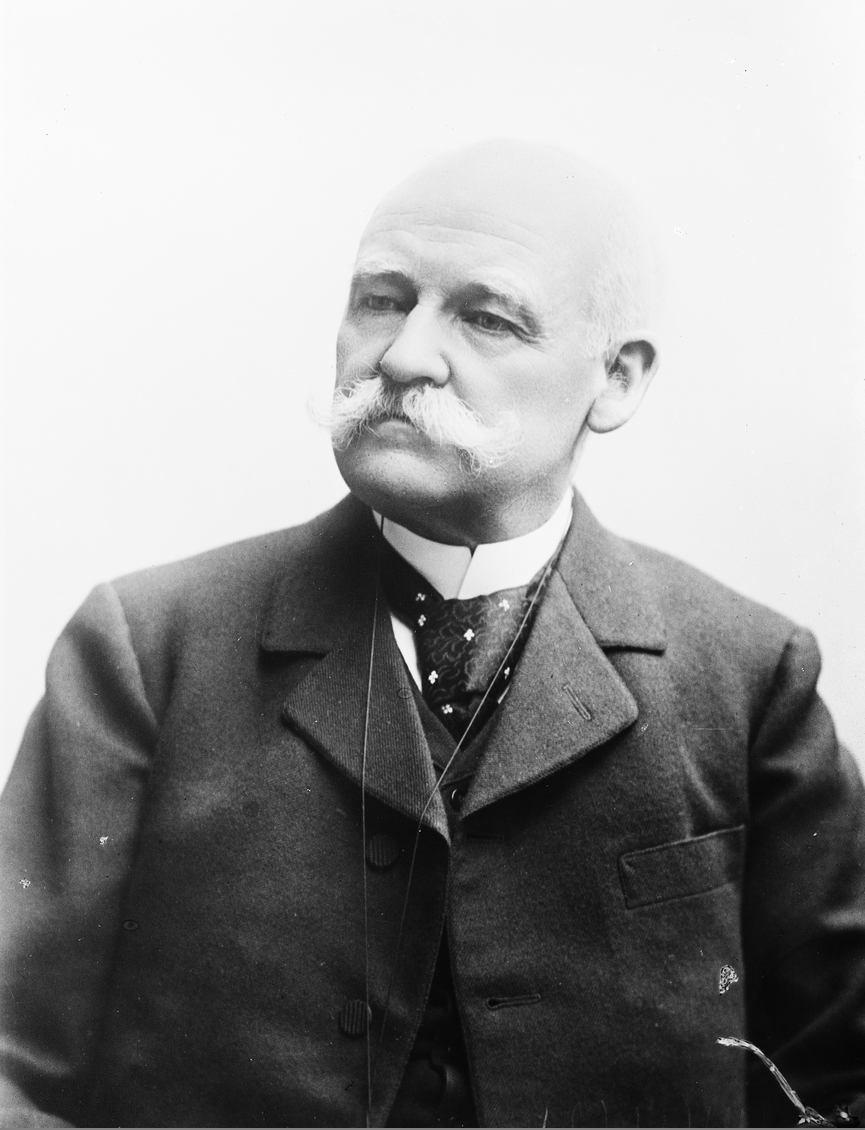
- Born: 31 July 1833; Bergen, Norway
- Died: 29 December 1910 (aged 77); Oslo, Norway
- Known for: Architecture
- Spouse: Nielsine Cecilie von Tangen (1835–1922)

Henrik Thrap-Meyer (31 July 1833 – 29 December 1910) was a Norwegian architect. He is most associated with a wide range of significant buildings, including churches and schools.

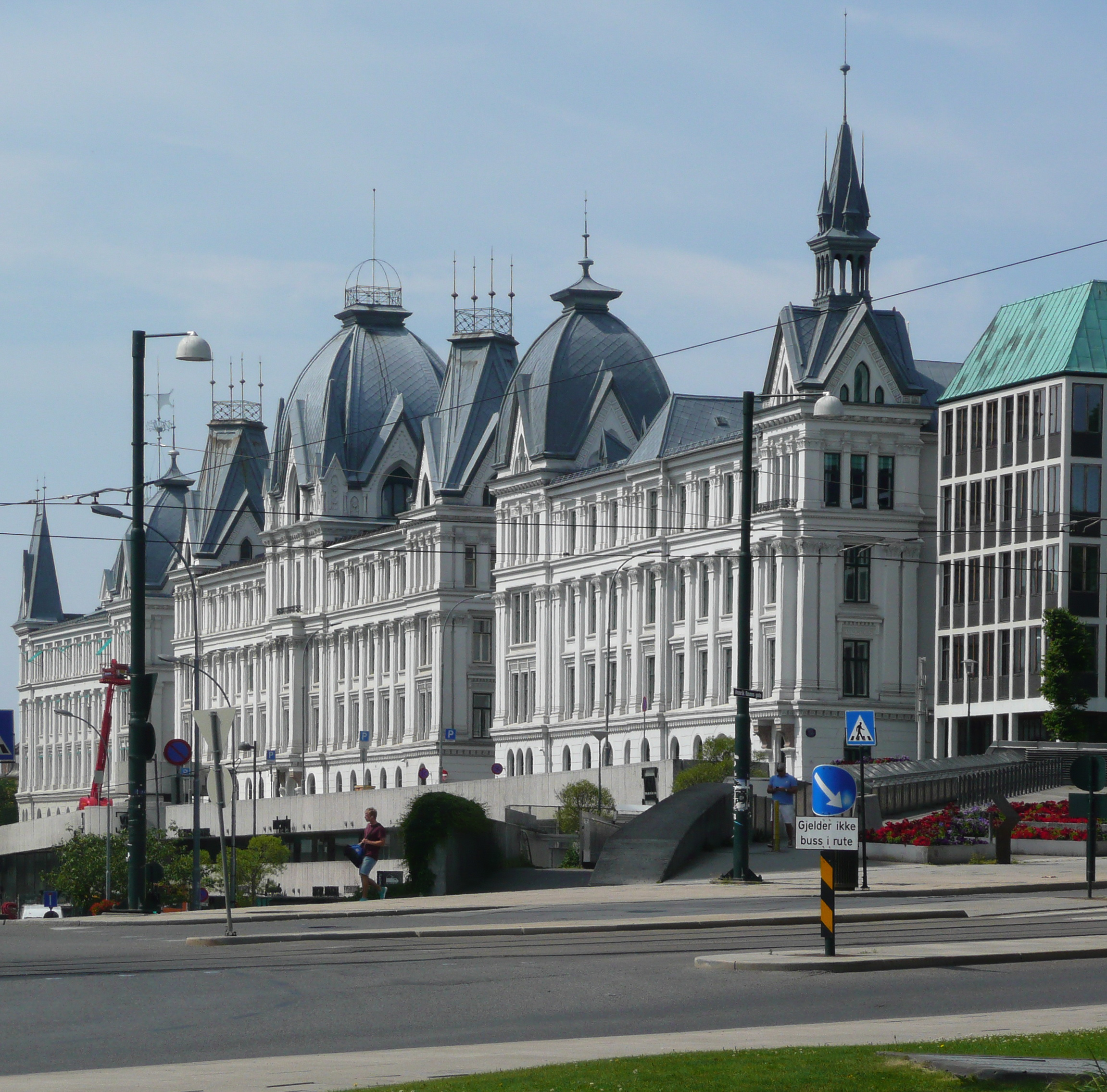
Victoria Terrasse

Thrap-Meyer was born in Bergen, Norway. He was the son of Johan Jacob Busch Meyer (1801–1880) and Henriette Christiane Thrap (1812–1883). He was educated at Polytechnicum in Hannover and Zurich (1855–1860). He also conducted study trips to England 1870–71; Italy 1873; France 1878.

He was a teacher at Bergen's Drawing School from 1860 to 1863. In 1864 he started his own architectural office in Christiania (now Oslo), and for many years he was among the country's leading architects. Thrap-Meyer was the Church Ministry Building consultant for many years and received the task to draw many schools, churches and other public buildings. Between 1886 and 1904, Thrap-Meyer was engaged as the architect in the development of the hospital for the Lovisenberg Deaconess College (Lovisenberg diakonale høgskole), a private college for nursing in the district of St. Hanshaugen in Oslo.

He is most commonly associated with his work on Victoria Terrasse, a building complex in the Ruseløkka district of central Oslo, which was built during the 1880s. The complex consists of three blocks with four and five-story tenements in plastered brick, with a uniform façade design and crowned by numerous domes and towers. The complex now houses the Norwegian Ministry of Foreign Affairs.

He was a co-founder The Norwegian Engineering and Architectural Association (Norske arkitekters landsforbund) and of the Oslo Handicraft and Industrial Association (Oslo Håndverks- og Industriforening).

== Selected works ==
- Victoria Terrasse and Ruseløkkbasarene (1881–90)
- Onsøy Church (1877)
- Kristiansand Cathedral (1880–85)
- Major renovation of Porsgrunn City Hall (1882)
- Kirkelandet kirke, Kristiansund (1875–78, burned 1940)
- Grimstad New Church, (expansion from 1887 to 1888, burned in 1944)
- Lillesand Church (1889)
- Hønefoss Prison (1862–1863)
- Vaterlands Elementary school (1873)
- Skien Latin School (1878–1883)

== Gallery ==
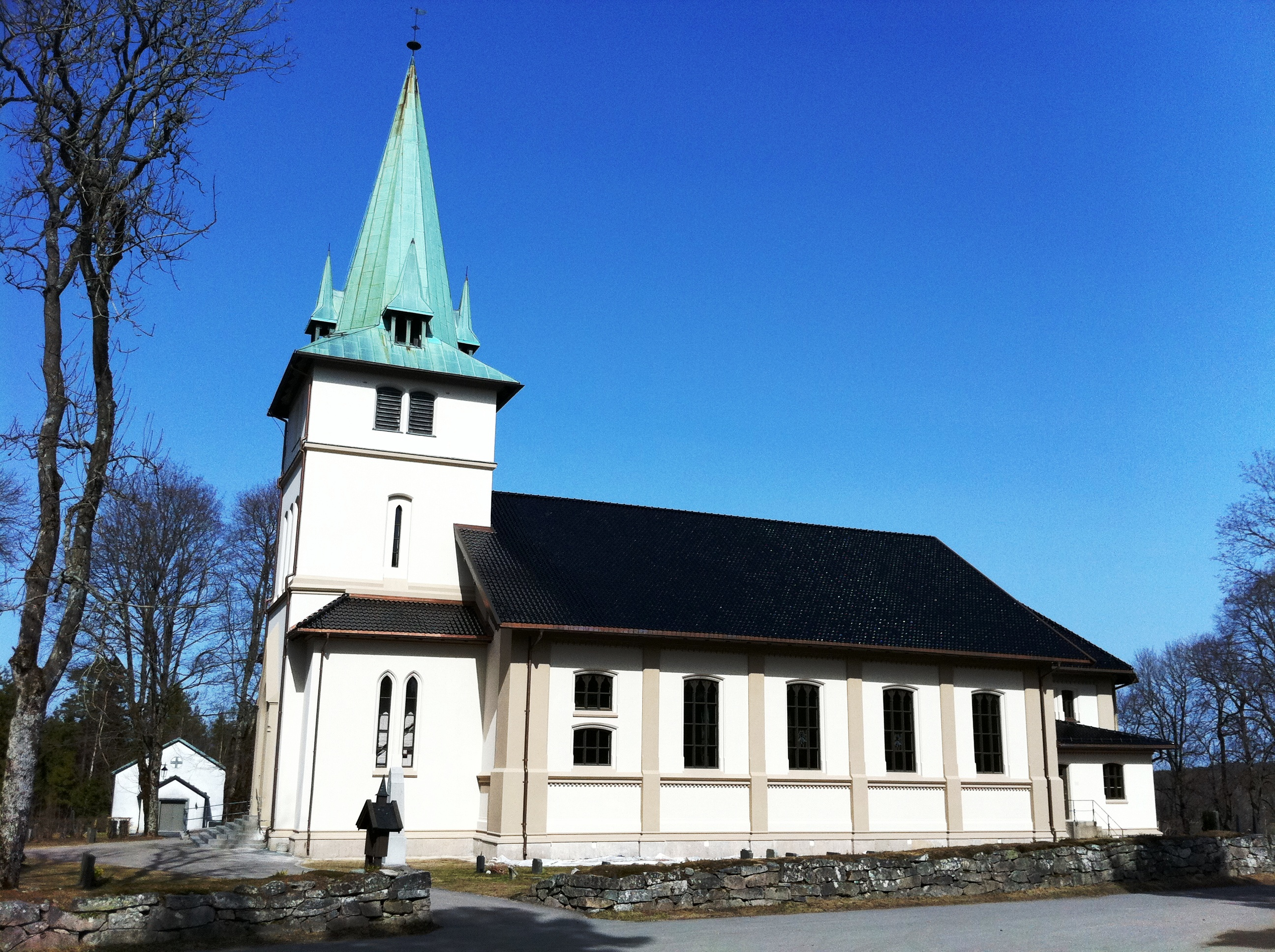
Onsøy Church

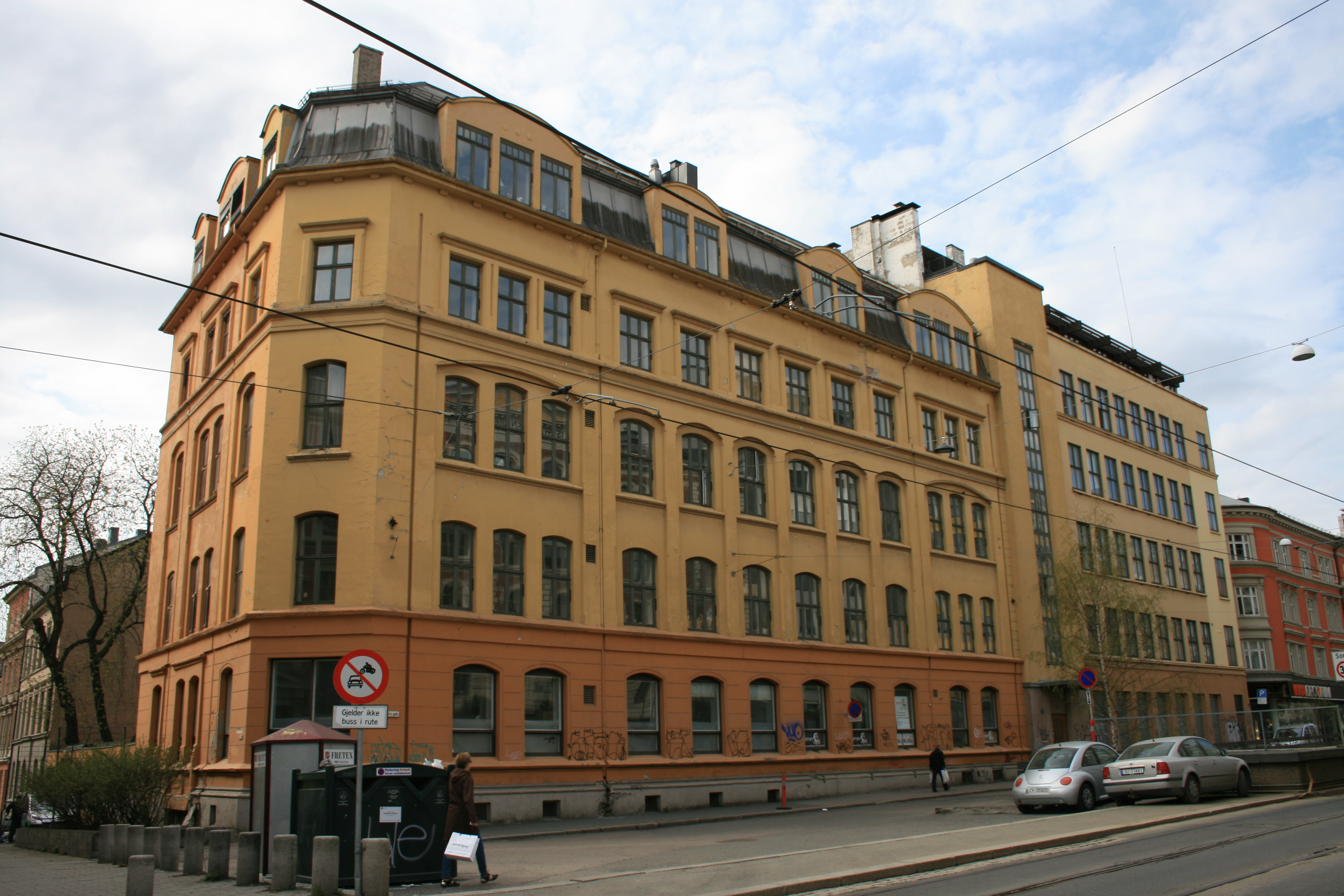
State Teacher Training College (Oslo)

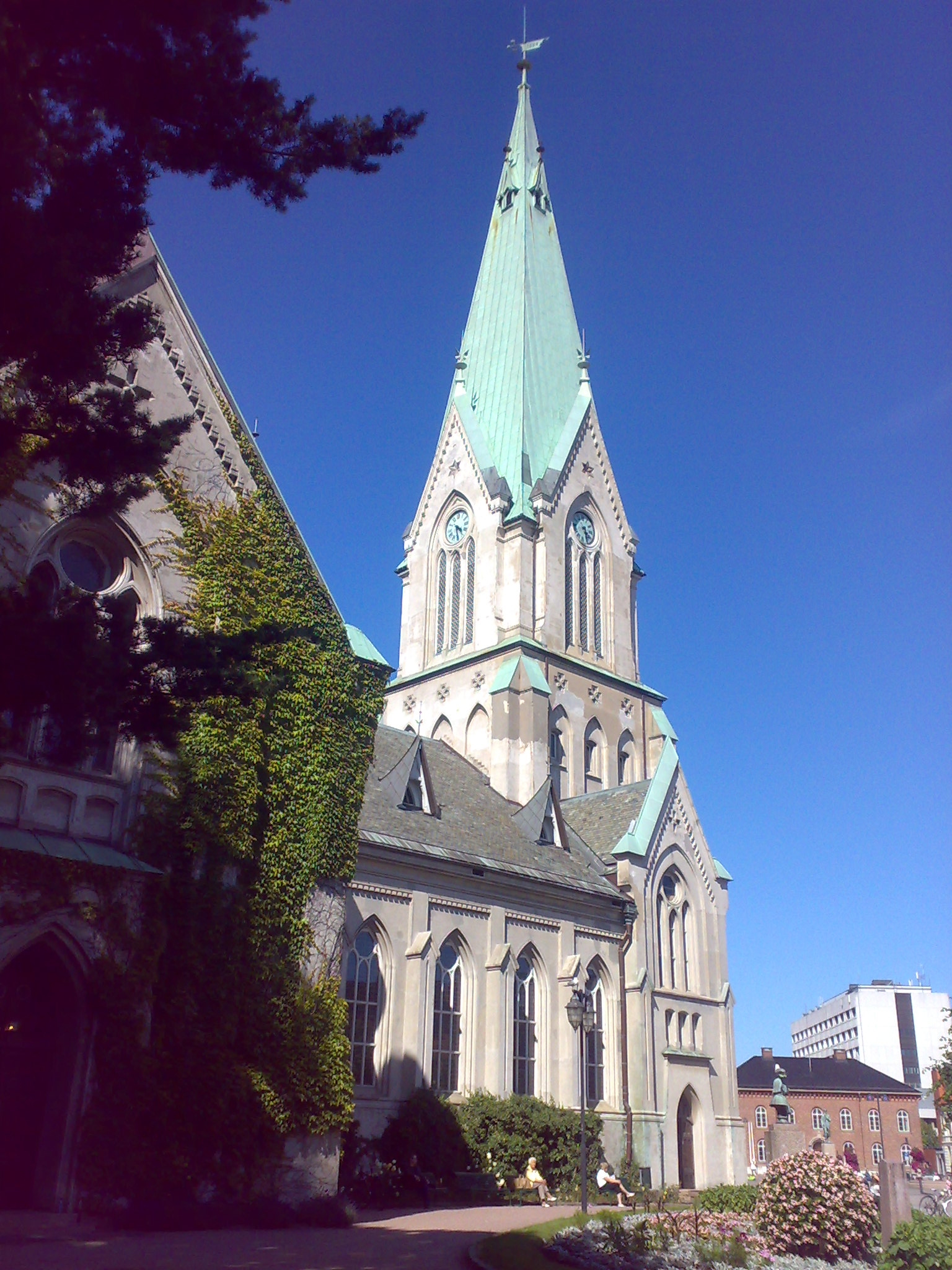
Kristiansand Cathedral

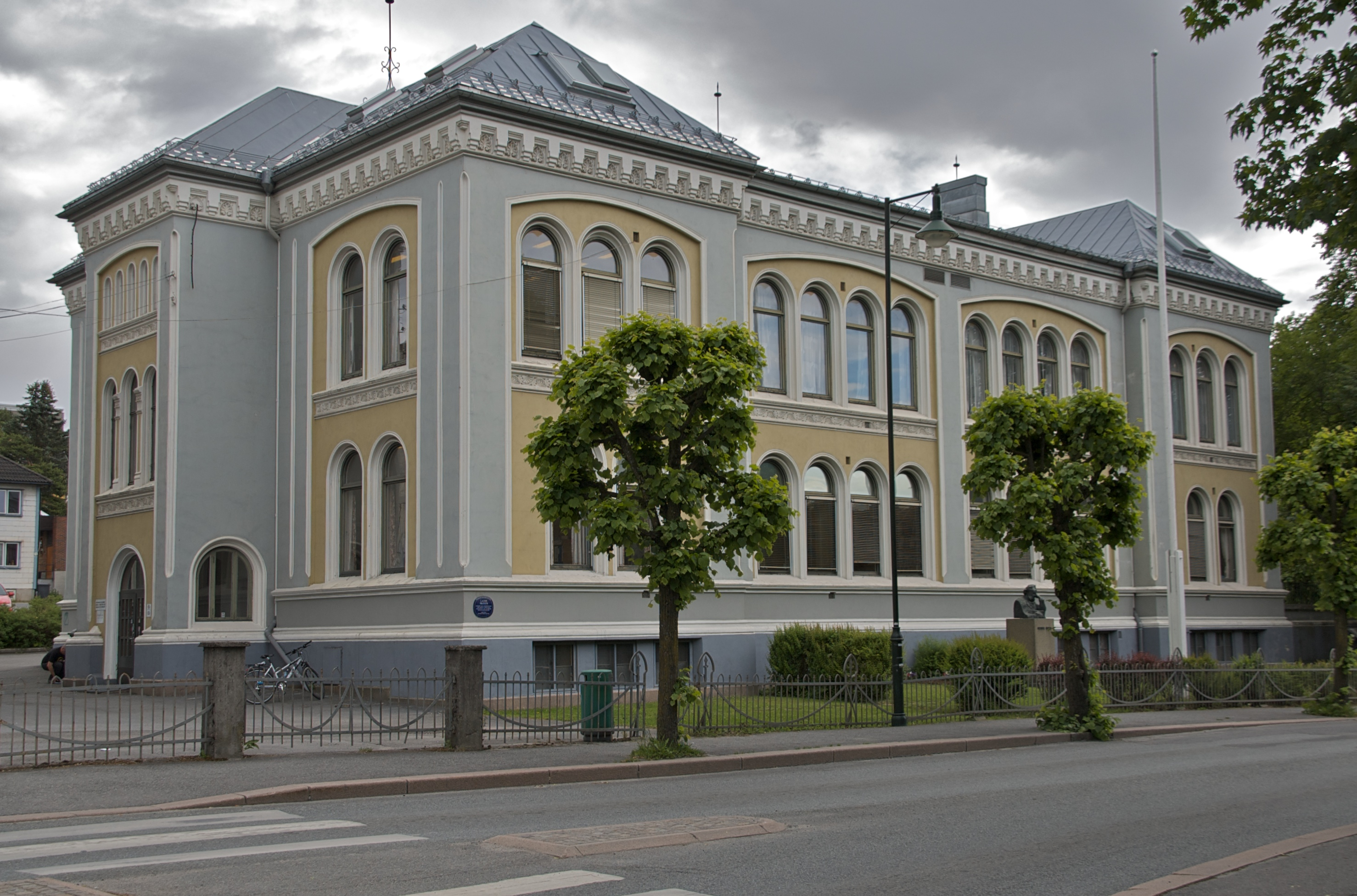
Skien Latin School

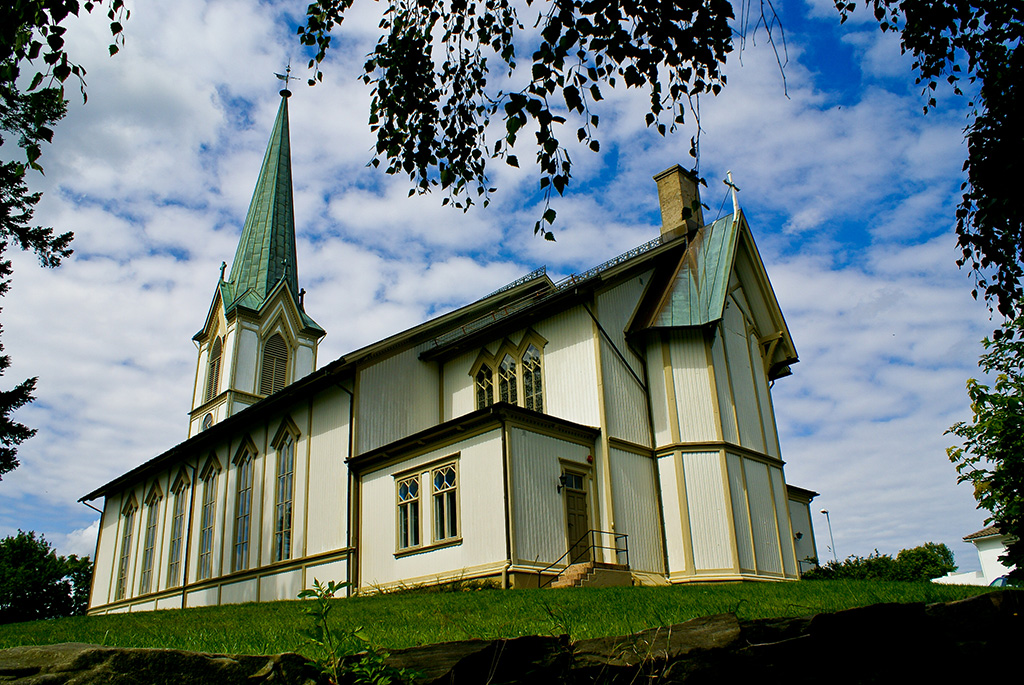
Lillesand Church
