= Kroken, Grimstad =

Village in Grimstad Municipality, Norway

Kroken
- Village
- Interactive map of Kroken
- Coordinates: 58.4067°N 08.5930°E
- Country: Norway
- Region: Southern Norway
- County: Agder
- District: Østre Agder
- Municipality: Grimstad Municipality
- Elevation: 53 m (174 ft)
- Time zone: UTC+01:00 (CET)
  - Summer (DST): UTC+02:00 (CEST)
- Post Code: 4885 Grimstad

Kroken is a village in Grimstad Municipality in Agder county, Norway. The village is located between the lake Rore and the river Nidelva, about 7 kilometres (4.3 mi) north of the town of Grimstad and about 2 kilometres (1.2 mi) west of the village of Rykene.
