= Espenes, Agder =

Village in Grimstad Municipality, Norway

Espenes
- Village
- Interactive map of Espenes
- Coordinates: 58.38806°N 8.70663°E
- Country: Norway
- Region: Southern Norway
- County: Agder
- District: Østre Agder
- Municipality: Grimstad Municipality
- Elevation: 12 m (39 ft)
- Time zone: UTC+01:00 (CET)
  - Summer (DST): UTC+02:00 (CEST)
- Post Code: 4870 Fevik

Espenes is a small village in the northeastern part of Grimstad Municipality in Agder county, Norway. The village lies near the Skaggerak coast, just north of the village of Fevik and just south of the town of Arendal.
