= Homborsund =

Village in Grimstad Municipality, Norway

- Village
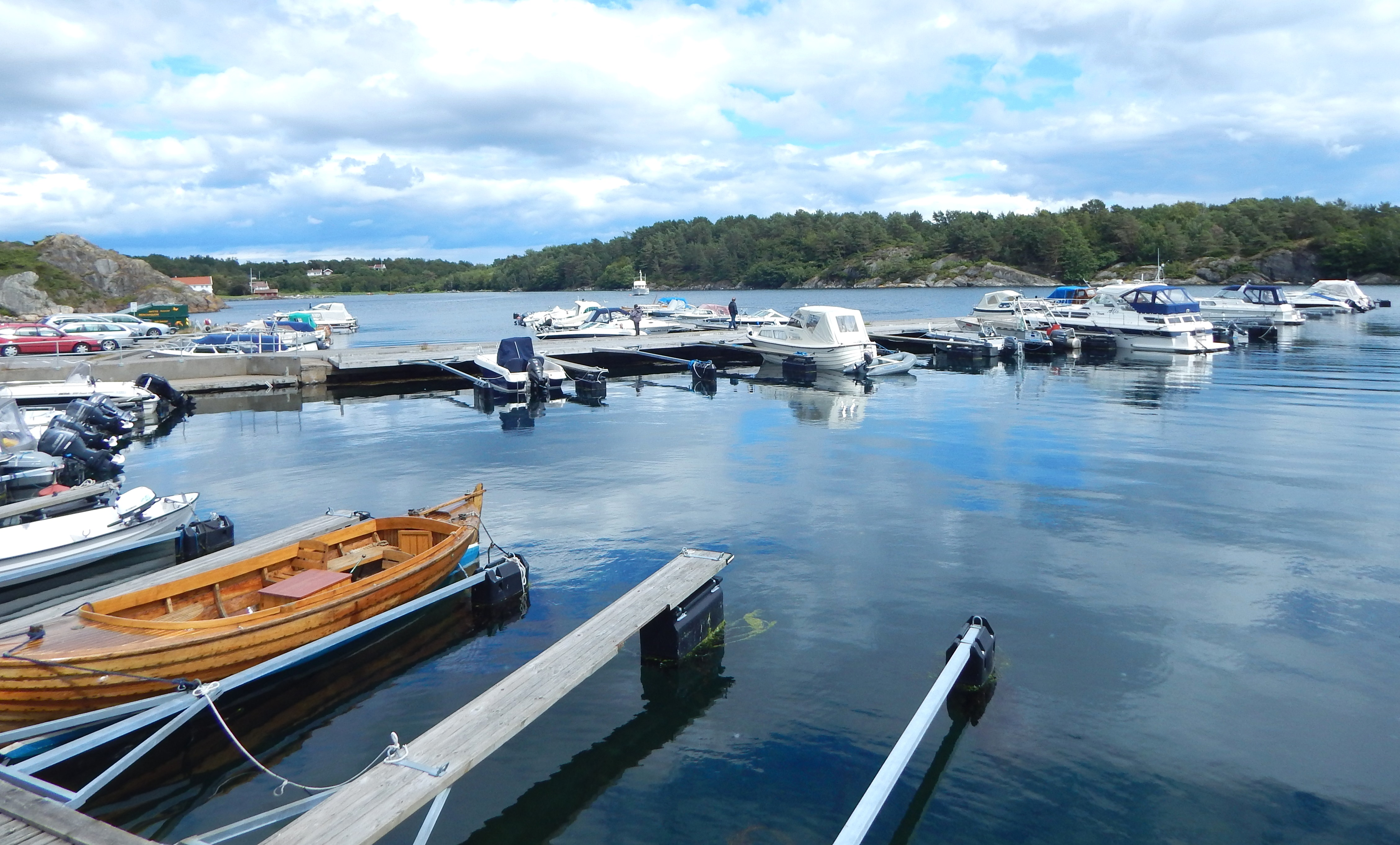
- View of the village harbour
- Interactive map of Homborsund
- Coordinates: 58.2682°N 08.5109°E
- Country: Norway
- Region: Southern Norway
- County: Agder
- District: Østre Agder
- Municipality: Grimstad Municipality
- Elevation: 14 m (46 ft)
- Time zone: UTC+01:00 (CET)
  - Summer (DST): UTC+02:00 (CEST)
- Post Code: 4888 Homborsund

Homborsund is a village in Grimstad Municipality in Agder county, Norway. The village is located on the Skagerrak coast in southern Grimstad (prior to 1962, the area was part of Eide Municipality. The village of Jortveit is located just north of Homborsund.

For statistical purposes the population of the two villages are counted as one urban area with a population of 679 (in 2025).

There is a school with about 100 students and a kindergarten in Homborsund: Eide skole and Eide Barnehage.

== Points of interest ==
The village includes the coastal protected recreational areas of Kalvehageneset and Hoveneset. Hoveneset was sold by Magnus Nymann, a former village priest, to the local authority in order to protect it from development by holidaymakers as the local area is a popular place to own a holiday cabin. This is commemorated by a small cairn near the shore inscribed with Bible verses and poetry by Thomas Kingo.

The Homborsund Lighthouse lies a short distance off shore, on the island of Store Grønningen.

Homborsund is home to a micro brewery, Homborsund Bryggeri, established in 2017.
