= Homborsund Lighthouse =

Coastal lighthouse in Grimstad, Norway

Homborsund Lighthouse Homborsund fyrstasjon
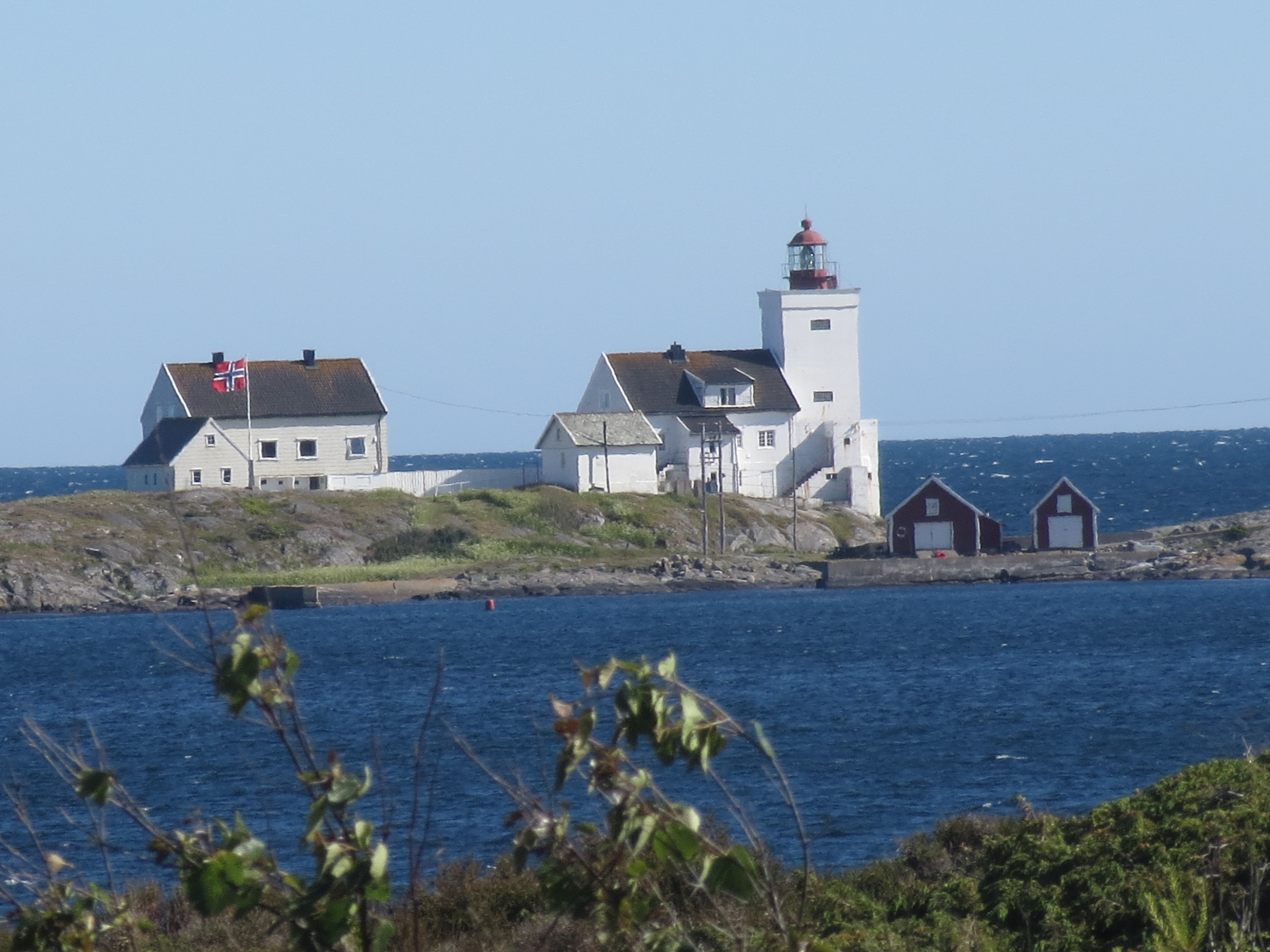
- View of the lighthouse
- Location: Agder, Norway
- Coordinates: 58.253903°N 08.529359°E

Tower
- Constructed: 1879
- Construction: Concrete
- Automated: 1992
- Height: 20.1 metres (66 ft)
- Shape: Square tower
- Markings: White with red top
- Heritage: cultural heritage preservation in Norway

Light
- Focal height: 22.3 metres (73 ft)
- Lens: 3rd order Fresnel lens
- Intensity: 58,500 cd (fixed); 423,900 cd (flash)
- Range: 14.5 nmi (26.9 km; 16.7 mi)
- Characteristic: FFl(4) W 60s
- Norway no.: 066500

Homborsund Lighthouse (Norwegian: Homborsund fyr) is a coastal lighthouse located on the island Store Grønningen in Grimstad Municipality in Agder county, Norway. It sits about 2 kilometres (1.2 mi) southeast of the village of Homborsund which is its namesake. It was established in 1879, and is listed as a protected cultural site. Homborsund Lighthouse was constructed the same year as Lyngør Lighthouse, and the two stations have similar designs. The station includes a livinghouse for two families, outhouse, boathouse and pier, in addition to the light. The light was automated in 1992, and the station was de-populated. Today it is open to the public for overnight stays and guidance. The surrounding area is a protected bird sanctuary.

The 20.1-metre (66 ft) tall, white, square-shaped tower has a red top. The light on top sits at an elevation of 22.3 metres (73 ft) above sea level. The light can be seen for up to 14.5 nautical miles (26.9 km; 16.7 mi). The 3rd order Fresnel lens on top emits a continuous white light with four brighter flashes every 60 seconds. The light has an intensity of 58,500 candela, but during the brighter flashes, the light reaches an intensity of 423,900 candela.

== See also ==
- Lighthouses in Norway
- List of lighthouses in Norway
