= Grimstad Church =

Church in Agder, Norway

- Grimstad kirke
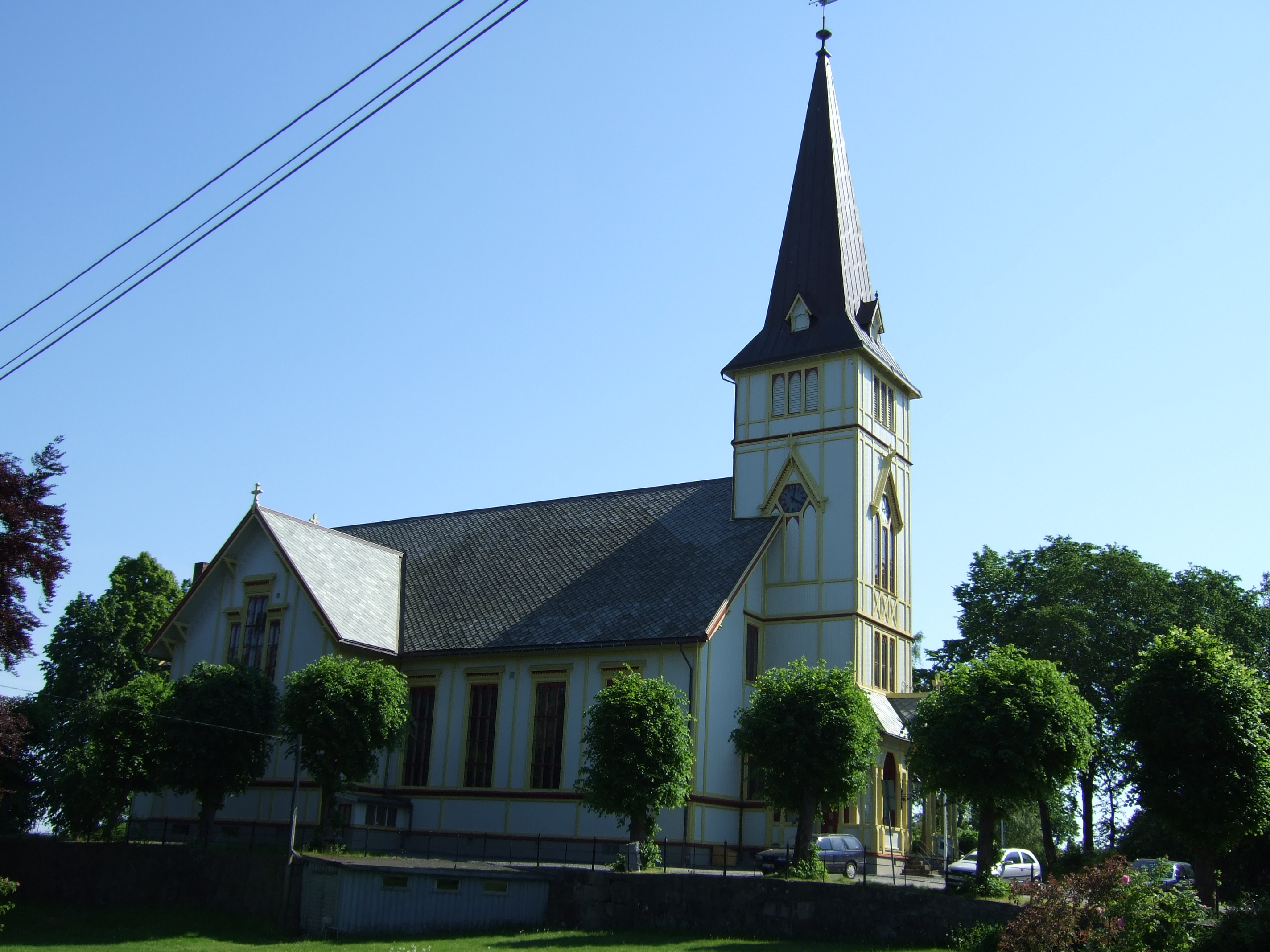
- View of the church
- Grimstad Church
- 58.3432°N 08.5952°E
- Location: Grimstad Municipality, Agder
- Country: Norway
- Denomination: Church of Norway
- Churchmanship: Evangelical Lutheran

History
- Status: Parish church
- Founded: 1849
- Consecrated: 7 Apr 1881

Architecture
- Functional status: Active
- Architect: Henrik Thrap-Meyer
- Architectural type: Cruciform
- Style: Neo-Gothic
- Completed: 1881 (145 years ago)

Specifications
- Capacity: 1,000
- Materials: Wood

Administration
- Diocese: Agder og Telemark
- Deanery: Vest-Nedenes prosti
- Parish: Grimstad
- Norwegian Cultural Heritage Site
- Type: Church
- Status: Listed
- ID: 84422

Grimstad Church (Norwegian: Grimstad kirke) is a parish church of the Church of Norway in Grimstad Municipality in Agder county, Norway. It is located in the town of Grimstad. It is the church for the Grimstad parish which is part of the Vest-Nedenes prosti (deanery) in the Diocese of Agder og Telemark. The large, green, wooden church was built in a cruciform design in 1881 using plans drawn up by the architect Henrik Thrap-Meyer. The church seats about 1,000 people, making it one of the largest wooden churches in Norway.

== History ==
The first church in the growing town of Grimstad was built in 1849 on a prominent hill overlooking the harbour. The new church was consecrated on 2 December 1849. The church was designed by the architect Wilhelm Hanstein. The church was not very large, so it was quickly outgrown by the town. There was also a cemetery surrounding the church, but just like the original church, it quickly filled up and it is no longer used. A new cemetery was opened in Frivoll in 1872 and it has been in use since that time. In 1881, the church building was disassembled and moved to the nearby parish of Nedenes and it was rebuilt to become the Engene Church (in present-day Arendal Municipality).

After the old church was taken away, a new, much larger church was built in Grimstad and it was consecrated on 7 April 1881. The new church was quite large, making it the third largest wooden church in Norway (after Mandal Church and Vågan Church). Originally, the church was said to seat 1,150 but with today's fire codes, it is now said to seat up to 1,000 people.

This was the first Neo-Gothic church in Norway to have its exterior paint examined in the 1960s. After discovering the original colors, the parish had the church repainted to its original colors of a light green with contrasting trim painted in yellow and red ochre.

== Media gallery ==
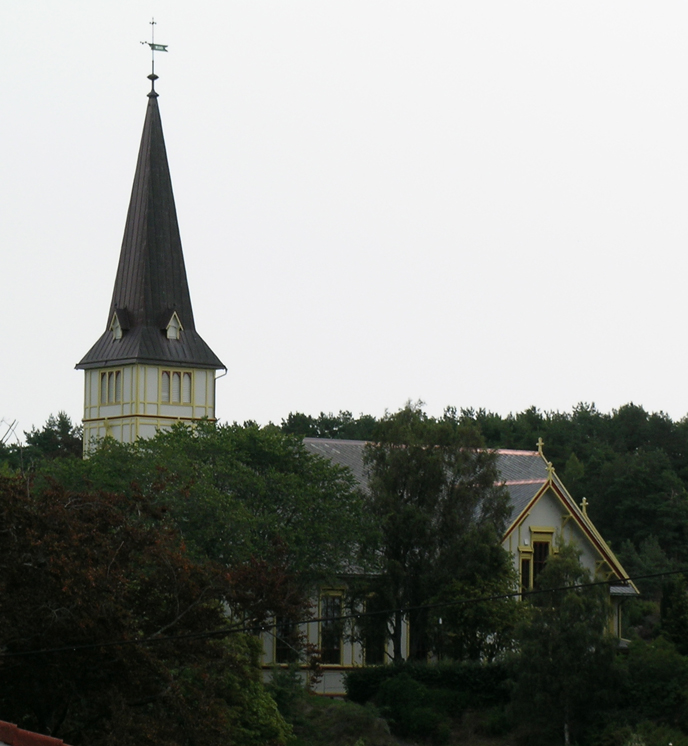

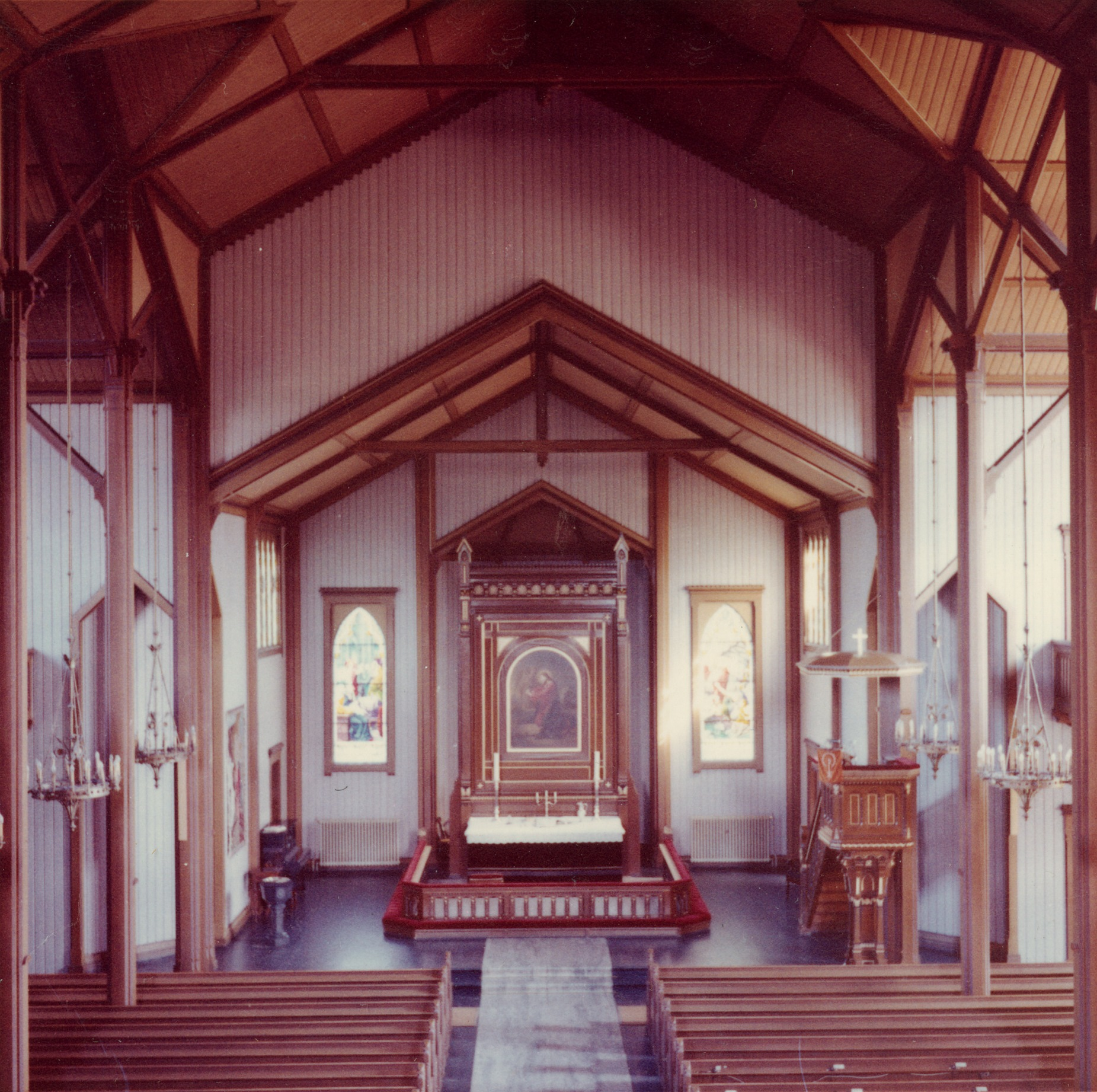

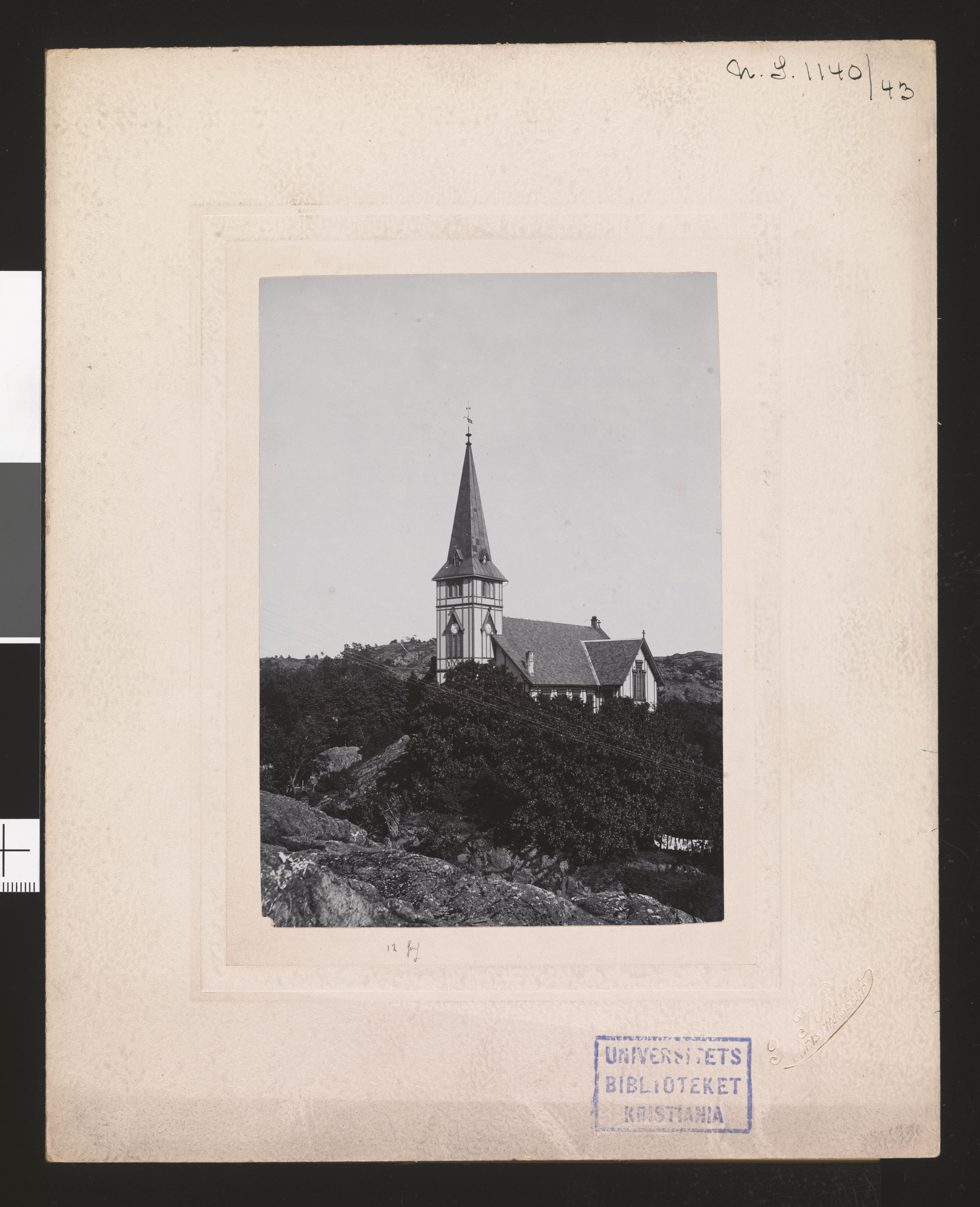

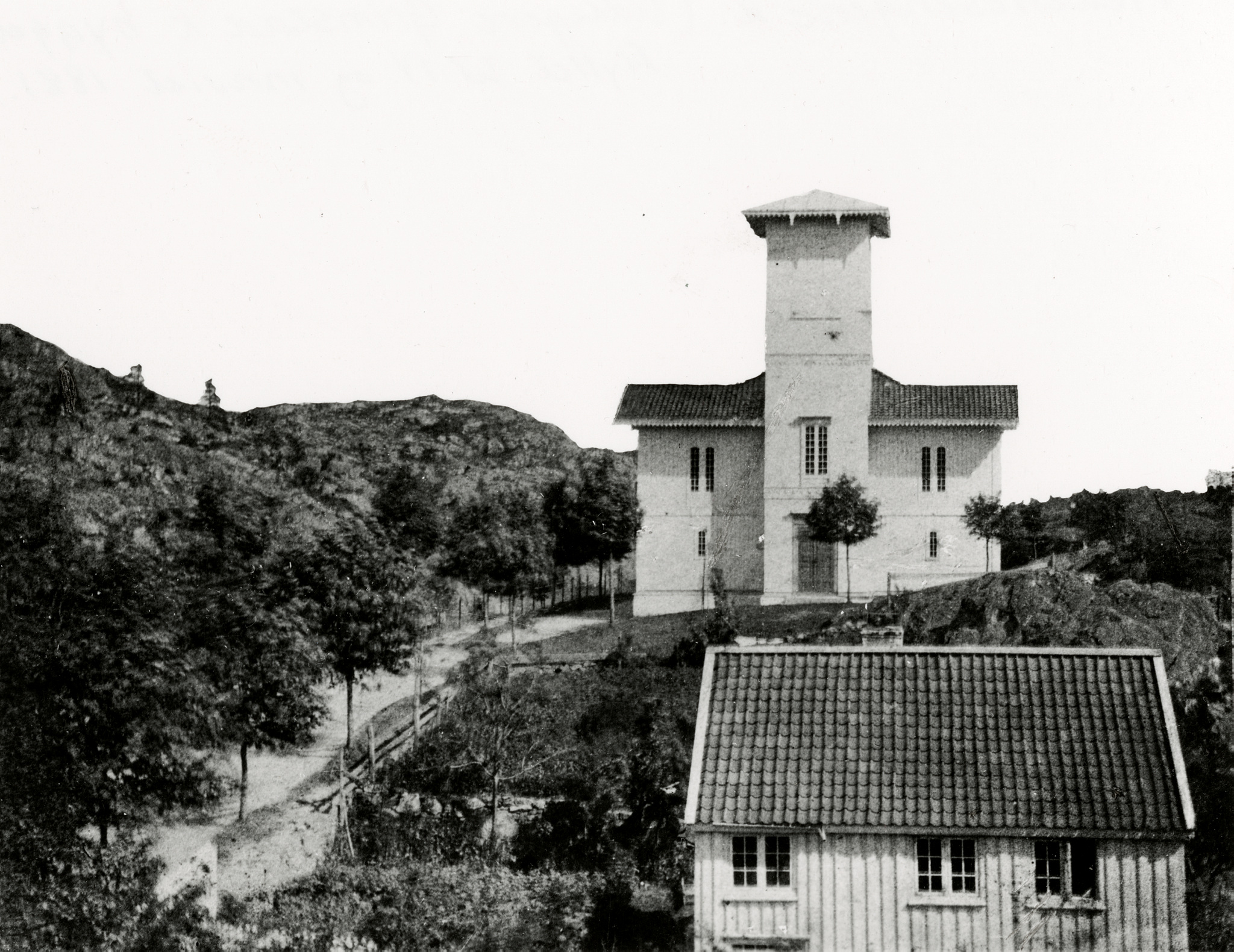
Grimstad's first church (1849-1881)

== See also ==
- List of churches in Agder og Telemark
