= Østerhus =

Village in Grimstad Municipality, Norway

- Village
- Interactive map of Østerhus
- Coordinates: 58.2763°N 08.5149°E
- Country: Norway
- Region: Southern Norway
- County: Agder
- District: Østre Agder
- Municipality: Grimstad Municipality
- Elevation: 15 m (49 ft)
- Time zone: UTC+01:00 (CET)
  - Summer (DST): UTC+02:00 (CEST)
- Post Code: 4879 Grimstad

Østerhus is a village in Grimstad Municipality in Agder county, Norway. The village is located near the Skagerrak coast, about 3 kilometres (1.9 mi) south of the town of Grimstad. Østerhus Church is located in the village. There is a large industrial area in Østerhus.
