= Syndle =

Lake in Grimstad, Agder, Norway

- Søndlevatn (historic)
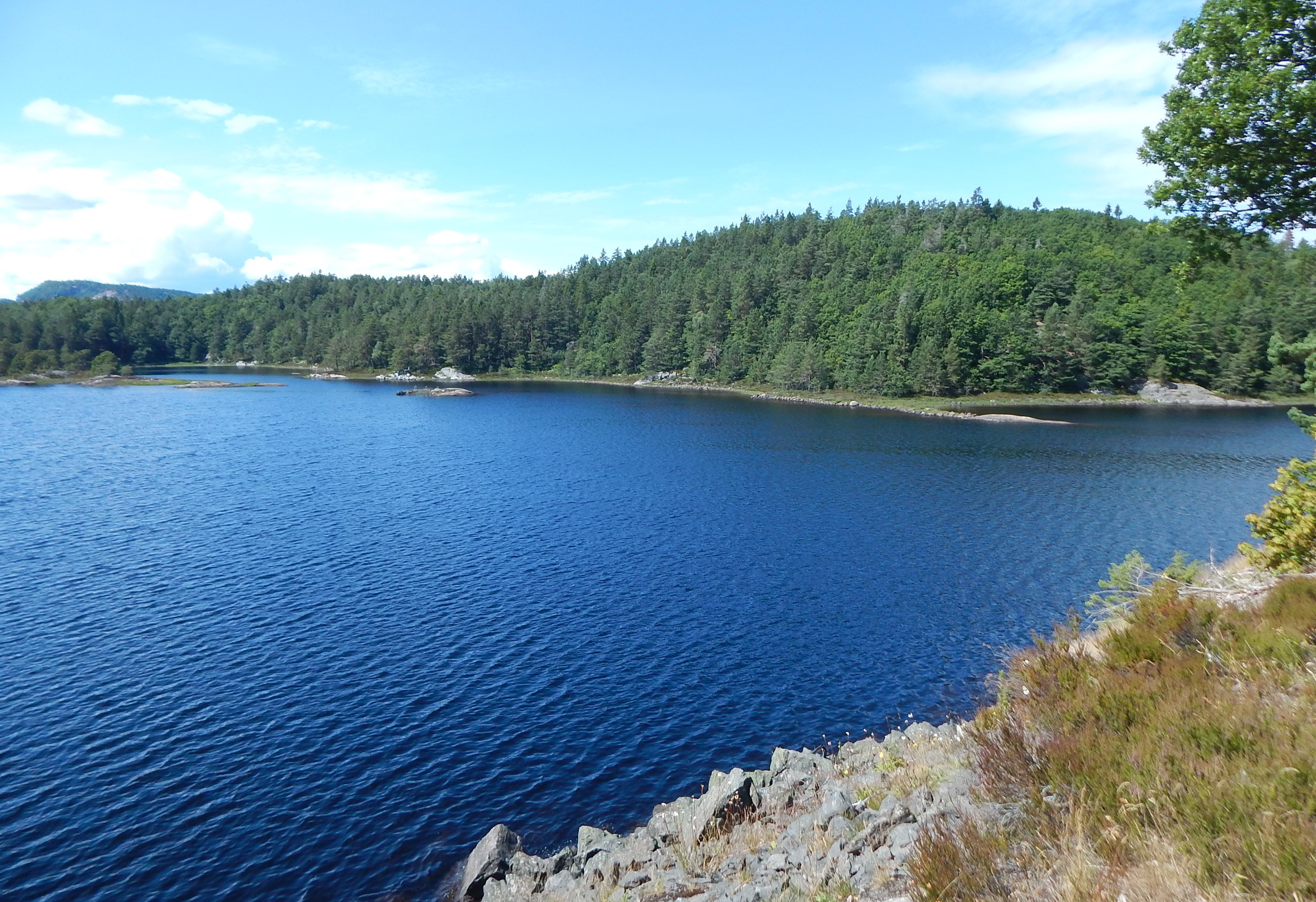
- View of the lake Syndle
- Location: Grimstad Municipality, Agder
- Coordinates: 58.36694°N 8.48556°E
- Primary outflows: Rore lake
- Basin countries: Norway
- Max. length: 4.5 kilometres (2.8 mi)
- Max. width: 3 kilometres (1.9 mi)
- Surface area: 6.04 km^{2} (2.33 sq mi)
- Shore length^{1}: 41.41 kilometres (25.73 mi)
- Surface elevation: 39 metres (128 ft)
- Islands: Syndlesøya and others
- References: NVE

Location
- Interactive map of Syndle
- ^{1} Shore length is not a well-defined measure.

Syndle is a lake in Grimstad Municipality in Agder county, Norway. It is located west of the village of Roresanden, about 5 kilometres (3.1 mi) northwest of the center of the town of Grimstad. The 6-square-kilometre (2.3 sq mi) lake Syndle flows into a small river on the northeast part of the lake which connects it to the neighboring lake Rore which eventually flows into the river Nidelva.

== See also ==
- List of lakes in Aust-Agder
- List of lakes in Norway
