= Roresand =

Village in Grimstad Municipality, Norway

- Village
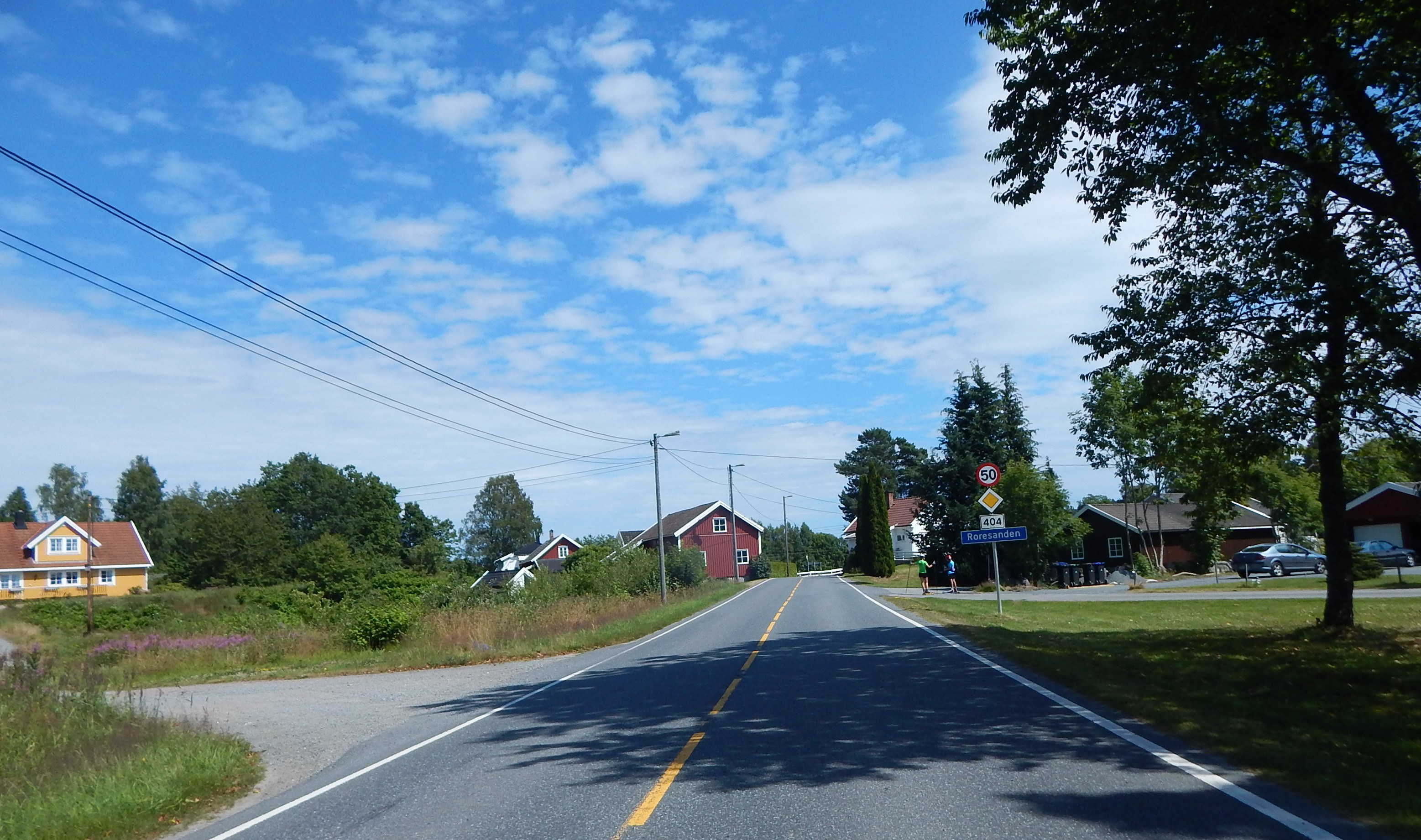
- View of the village
- Interactive map of Roresand
- Coordinates: 58.3515°N 08.5372°E
- Country: Norway
- Region: Southern Norway
- County: Agder
- District: Østre Agder
- Municipality: Grimstad Municipality
- Elevation: 44 m (144 ft)
- Time zone: UTC+01:00 (CET)
  - Summer (DST): UTC+02:00 (CEST)
- Post Code: 4885 Grimstad

Roresand is a village in Grimstad Municipality in Agder county, Norway. The village is located on the southwestern end of the lake Rore along the Norwegian County Road 404. The village sits about 4 kilometres (2.5 mi) northwest of the town of Grimstad, about 6 kilometres (3.7 mi) east of the village of Reddal, and about 7 kilometres (4.3 mi) south of the village of Skiftenes. The lake Syndle lies about 2 kilometres (1.2 mi) to the northwest and the lake Landvikvannet lies about the same distance to the south.

Landvik Church sits about 1 kilometre (0.62 mi) south of the village. The cemetery for the church is located in Roresand, right next to the Landvik school.

== History ==
The village of Roresand was the administrative centre of the old Landvik Municipality which existed until 1971.

== Climate ==
Climate data for Landvik 1991–2020 (6 m, average highs/lows 1998-2025, extremes 1957–2020)
Month	Jan	Feb	Mar	Apr	May	Jun	Jul	Aug	Sep	Oct	Nov	Dec	Year
Record high °C (°F)	12.8 (55.0)	18.7 (65.7)	23.1 (73.6)	24.2 (75.6)	27.7 (81.9)	31.2 (88.2)	30.8 (87.4)	32.2 (90.0)	27.3 (81.1)	21.9 (71.4)	16.8 (62.2)	13.8 (56.8)	32.2 (90.0)
Mean daily maximum °C (°F)	3.1 (37.6)	3.9 (39.0)	6.9 (44.4)	11.1 (52.0)	16 (61)	19.8 (67.6)	21.6 (70.9)	20.5 (68.9)	17.2 (63.0)	11.8 (53.2)	7.2 (45.0)	4.1 (39.4)	11.9 (53.5)
Daily mean °C (°F)	0.1 (32.2)	0.1 (32.2)	2.4 (36.3)	6.4 (43.5)	11.2 (52.2)	14.8 (58.6)	16.9 (62.4)	16.1 (61.0)	12.7 (54.9)	8 (46)	4.2 (39.6)	1.2 (34.2)	7.8 (46.1)
Mean daily minimum °C (°F)	−3 (27)	−2.6 (27.3)	−1.1 (30.0)	2.3 (36.1)	6.4 (43.5)	10.3 (50.5)	12.5 (54.5)	11.8 (53.2)	9.5 (49.1)	4.8 (40.6)	1.5 (34.7)	−1.9 (28.6)	4.2 (39.6)
Record low °C (°F)	−27.5 (−17.5)	−30.3 (−22.5)	−23.2 (−9.8)	−11.6 (11.1)	−2.6 (27.3)	0 (32)	3.5 (38.3)	3.5 (38.3)	−0.8 (30.6)	−8.1 (17.4)	−23.1 (−9.6)	−24 (−11)	−30.3 (−22.5)
Average precipitation mm (inches)	144.6 (5.69)	97 (3.8)	91.5 (3.60)	69.1 (2.72)	80.5 (3.17)	88.4 (3.48)	89.2 (3.51)	125.8 (4.95)	137.9 (5.43)	175.1 (6.89)	169.6 (6.68)	147.4 (5.80)	1,416.1 (55.72)
Average precipitation days (≥ 1.0 mm)	24	21	19	17	14	16	13	14	14	20	21	21	214
Source 1: NOAA
Source 2: eklima/met.no database
