= Landvik Church =

Church in Agder, Norway

- Landvik kirke
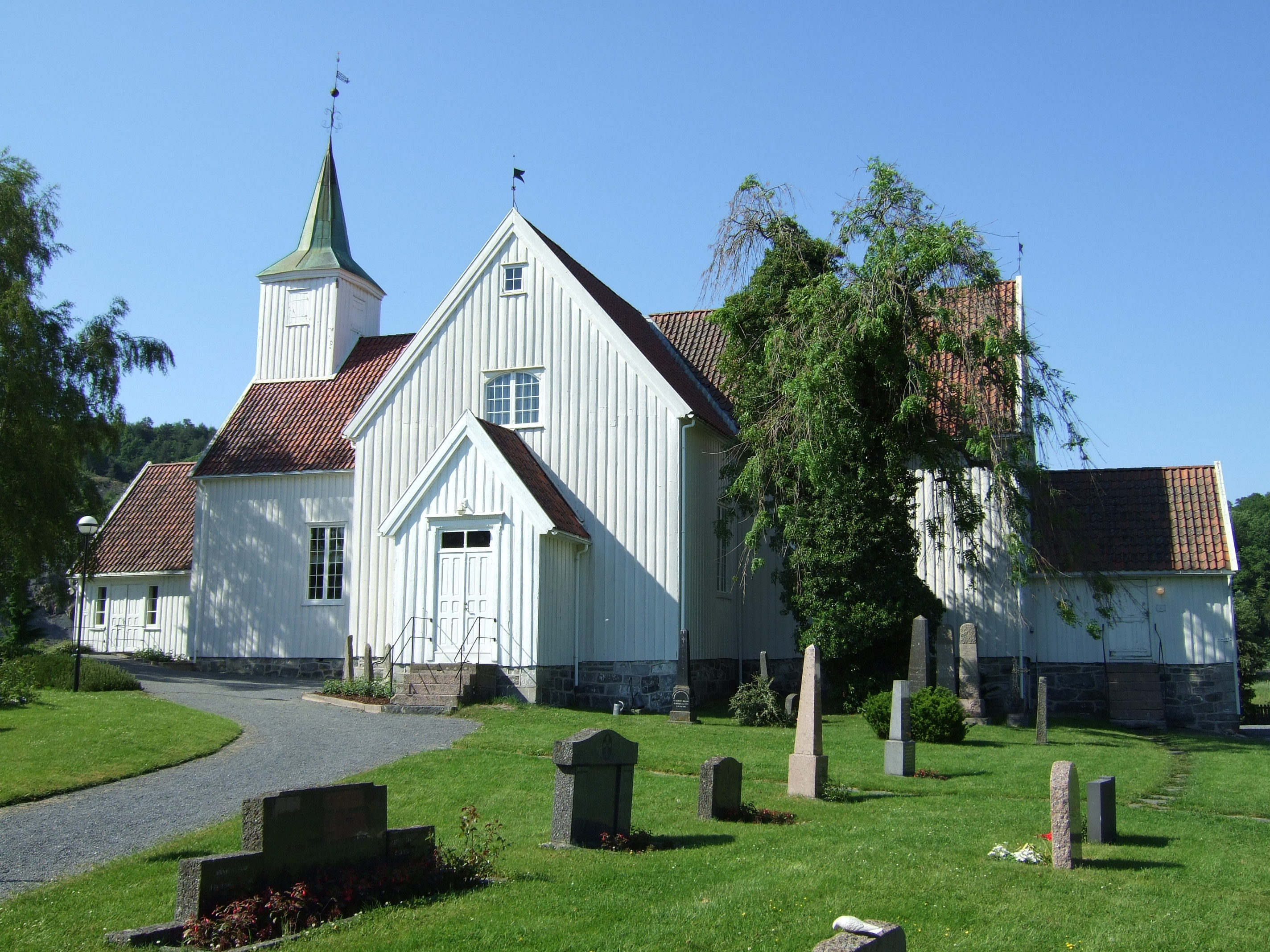
- View of the church
- Landvik Church
- 58.341607°N 08.522334°E
- Location: Grimstad Municipality, Agder
- Country: Norway
- Denomination: Church of Norway
- Previous denomination: Catholic Church
- Churchmanship: Evangelical Lutheran

History
- Status: Parish church
- Founded: 12th century
- Consecrated: 17 July 1825

Architecture
- Functional status: Active
- Architectural type: Cruciform
- Completed: 1824 (202 years ago)

Specifications
- Capacity: 400
- Materials: Wood

Administration
- Diocese: Agder og Telemark
- Deanery: Vest-Nedenes prosti
- Parish: Landvik
- Norwegian Cultural Heritage Site
- Type: Church
- Status: Automatically protected
- ID: 84892

Landvik Church (Norwegian: Landvik kirke) is a parish church of the Church of Norway in Grimstad Municipality in Agder county, Norway. It is located just southwest of the village of Roresand in the Landvik area. It is the church for the Landvik parish which is part of the Vest-Nedenes prosti (deanery) in the Diocese of Agder og Telemark. The white, wooden church was built in a cruciform design in 1824 using plans drawn up by an unknown architect. The church seats about 400 people.

== History ==
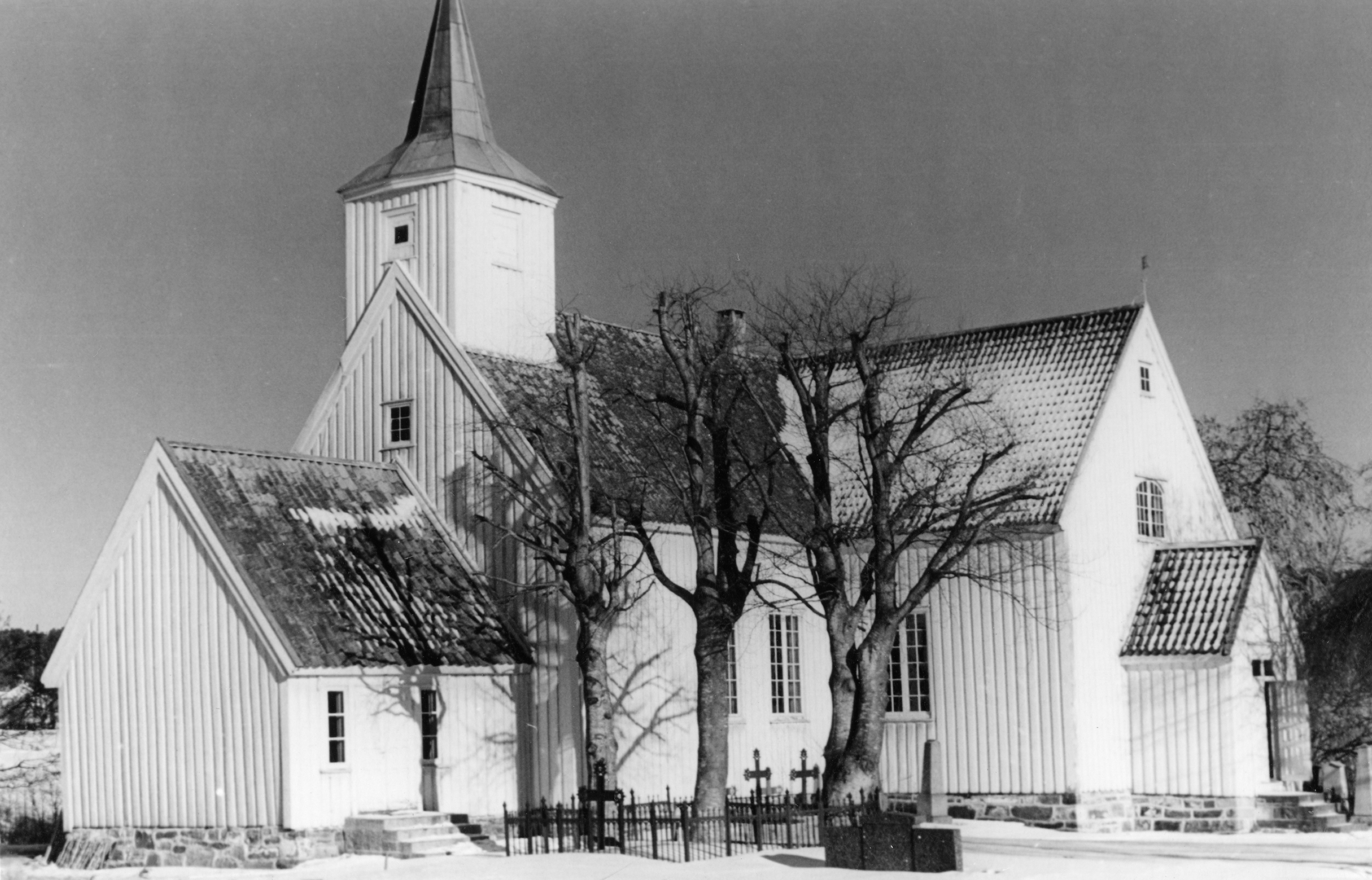
View of the church in 1947

The earliest existing historical records of the church date back to the year 1378, but the first church was likely built during the 12th century. That first church was a stone church and it was the main church for the Hommedal parish, so the church was sometimes called Hommedal Church. The old church had a rectangular nave and narrower, rectangular chancel on the east end. In 1660, a tower and entryway was constructed on the west end of the building. The church, like most other churches in Norway, was sold into private ownership during the Norwegian church sale in 1723 to help the King pay off war debts. In 1730, the new owner constructed a sacristy on the east end of the building. In 1761, a group of 60 local farmers purchased the church from the private owner and gave the ownership of the church to the parish. In 1795, the shape of the tower was reconstructed so that it was described as tall and slender.

In 1814, this church served as an election church (Norwegian: valgkirke). Together with more than 300 other parish churches across Norway, it was a polling station for elections to the 1814 Norwegian Constituent Assembly which wrote the Constitution of Norway. This was Norway's first national elections. Each church parish was a constituency that elected people called "electors" who later met together in each county to elect the representatives for the assembly that was to meet at Eidsvoll Manor later that year.

Over time, the old stone church became too small for the parish, so in 1823 it was torn down. Some of the old stones were re-used in the construction of the new wooden church which was built in 1824 on the same site. Some local traditions say that the entry porch of the current church was reused from the old stone church, but that is not proven. The newly constructed building was consecrated on 17 July 1825.

In the 1890s, the interior was transformed into a Neo-Gothic style with colors in brown and beige, but in 1955 the church underwent an extensive restoration with a return to the original style.

In 2000, a small addition was built on the northern cross arm which included a baptismal sacristy and in 2001 a bathroom was added. In 2014, a new pipe organ was purchased and installed in the balcony above the altar instead of in the back balcony where the previous organ was located. In 2017, the tower was restored.

=== Cemetery ===
The church has a graveyard located in the yard surrounding the church. This graveyard has been expanded several times over the years. In 1898, another graveyard was built about 1 kilometre (0.62 mi) away in the nearby village of Roresand because the old cemetery was running out of room.

== See also ==
- List of churches in Agder og Telemark
