= Eide =

Eide or EIDE may also refer to:

== Places ==
=== Norway ===
==== Villages ====
- Eide, Agder, a village in Grimstad Municipality in Agder county
- Eide, Askøy, a village in Askøy Municipality in Vestland county
- Eide, Bø, a village in Bø Municipality in Nordland county
- Eide, Granvin, a village in Voss Municipality in Vestland county
- Eide, Ullensvang, a village in Ullensvang Municipality in Vestland county
- Eide, Møre og Romsdal, a village in Hustadvika Municipality in Møre og Romsdal county
- Eide, Kopervik, a village in Karmøy Municipality in Rogaland county
- Eide, Lund, a village in Lund Municipality in Rogaland county
- Eide, Vats, a village in Vindafjord Municipality in Rogaland county

==== Municipalities ====
- Eide Municipality (Aust-Agder), a former municipality now part of Grimstad Municipality in Agder county
- Eide Municipality (Møre og Romsdal), a former municipality now part of Hustadvika Municipality in Møre og Romsdal county

==== Churches ====
- Eide Church (Agder), a church in Grimstad Municipality in Agder county
- Eide Church (Møre og Romsdal), a church in Hustadvika Municipality in Møre og Romsdal county

== Organisations ==
- Eide Bailly LLP, a US accounting and business advisory firm
- Eide Marine Services, a Norwegian shipping and maritime company

== Other uses ==
- Eide (surname)
- Enhanced IDE, now also known as Parallel ATA

== See also ==
- Eid (disambiguation)
- Eid Church (disambiguation)
- Eidet (disambiguation)
