= Landvik Municipality =

Former municipality in Aust-Agder, Norway

Landvik Municipality Landvik kommune
- Former municipality
- Landvig herred (historic name); Hommedal herred (historic name)
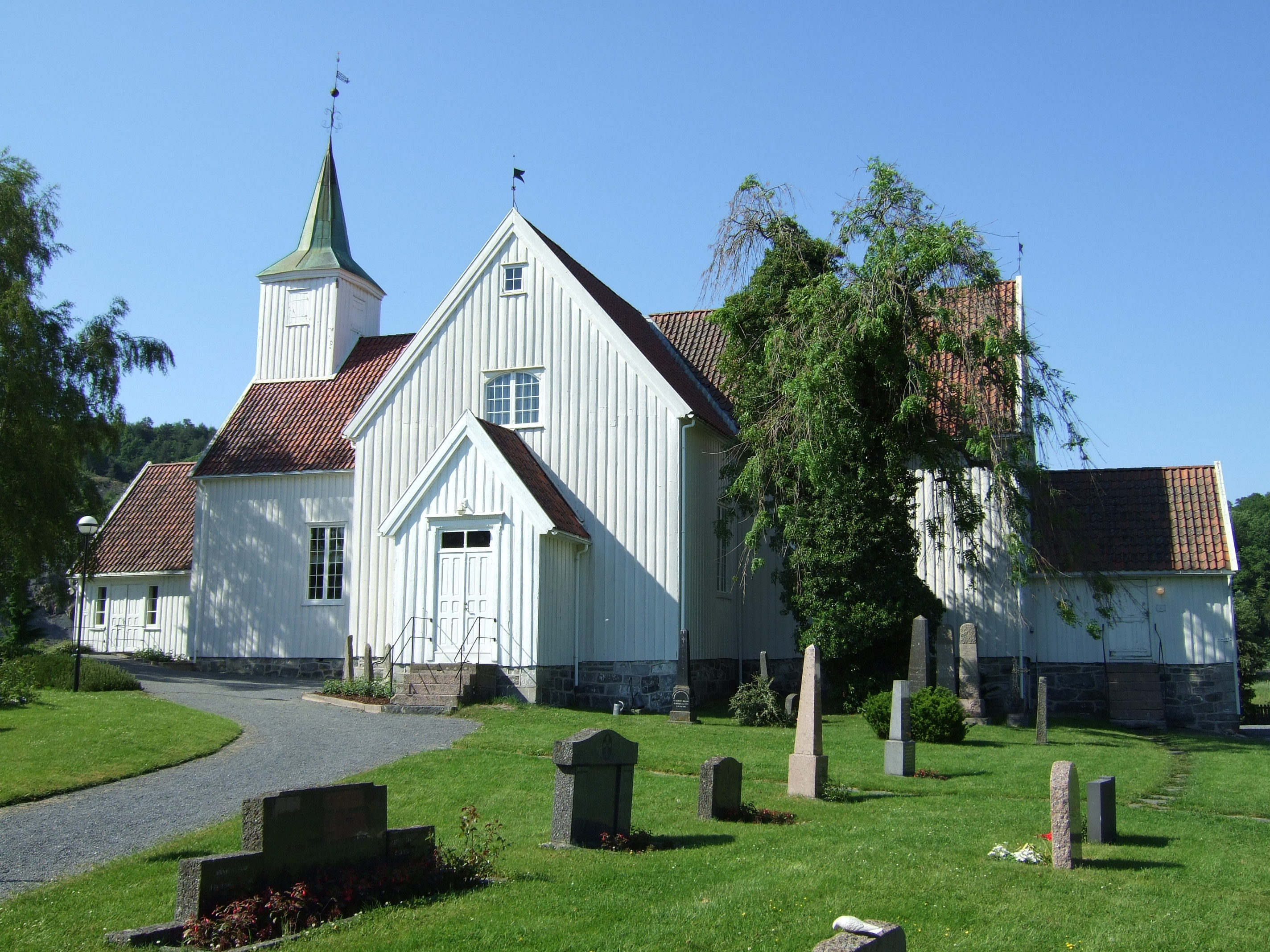
- View of the local church

- Aust-Agder within Norway

- Landvik within Aust-Agder
- Coordinates: 58°20′24″N 08°31′13″E
- Country: Norway
- County: Aust-Agder
- District: Østre Agder
- Established: 1 Jan 1838
  - Created as: Formannskapsdistrikt
- Disestablished: 1 Jan 1971
  - Succeeded by: Grimstad Municipality
- Administrative centre: Roresand

Government
  - Mayor (1967–1970): Per Løland (Sp)

Area (upon dissolution)
  - Total: 243.5 km^{2} (94.0 sq mi)
  - Rank: #303 in Norway
- Highest elevation: 361.64 m (1,186.5 ft)

Population (1970)
  - Total: 2,671
  - Rank: #323 in Norway
  - Density: 11/km^{2} (28/sq mi)
  - Change (10 years): ▲ +43.4%

Official language
  - Norwegian form: Nynorsk
- Time zone: UTC+01:00 (CET)
  - Summer (DST): UTC+02:00 (CEST)
- ISO 3166 code: NO-0924

Landvik is a former municipality in the old Aust-Agder county, Norway. The 243.5-square-kilometre (94.0 sq mi) municipality existed from 1838 until its dissolution in 1971. The area is now part of Grimstad Municipality in the traditional district of Østre Agder in Agder county. The administrative centre was the village of Roresand, just up the hill from Landvik Church. Other villages in the municipality included Molland, Reddal, Skiftenes, Tjore, and Østerhus. Today, the name "Landvik" is still used to designate the part of Grimstad Municipality from the Prestegårdskogen housing development and westwards.

Prior to its dissolution in 1971, the 243.5-square-kilometre (94.0 sq mi) municipality was the 303rd largest by area out of the 451 municipalities in Norway. Landvik Municipality was the 323rd most populous municipality in Norway with a population of about 2,671. The municipality's population density was 11 inhabitants per square kilometre (28/sq mi) and its population had increased by 43.4% over the previous 10-year period.

== General information ==
The parish of Hommedal (later renamed 'Landvik) was established as a municipality on 1 January 1838 (see formannskapsdistrikt law).

On 1 January 1883, the uninhabited Tolleholmen part of neighboring Birkenes Municipality was transferred to Landvik Municipality.

During the 1960s, there were many municipal mergers across Norway due to the work of the Schei Committee. On 1 January 1964, the following areas were merged to form an enlarged Landvik Municipality with a population of 2,433 residents:

- all of Landvik Municipality (population: 1,929)
- the Salvestjønn area of Øyestad Municipality (population: 0)
- most of Eide Municipality (population: 504), except for the Gitmark farm area which became part of Lillesand Municipality

On 1 January 1971, Landvik Municipality was dissolved and the following areas were merged to form an enlarged Grimstad Municipality:

- all of Landvik Municipality (population: 2,781)
- all of Fjære Municipality (population: 6,189)
- all of Grimstad Municipality (population: 2,794)
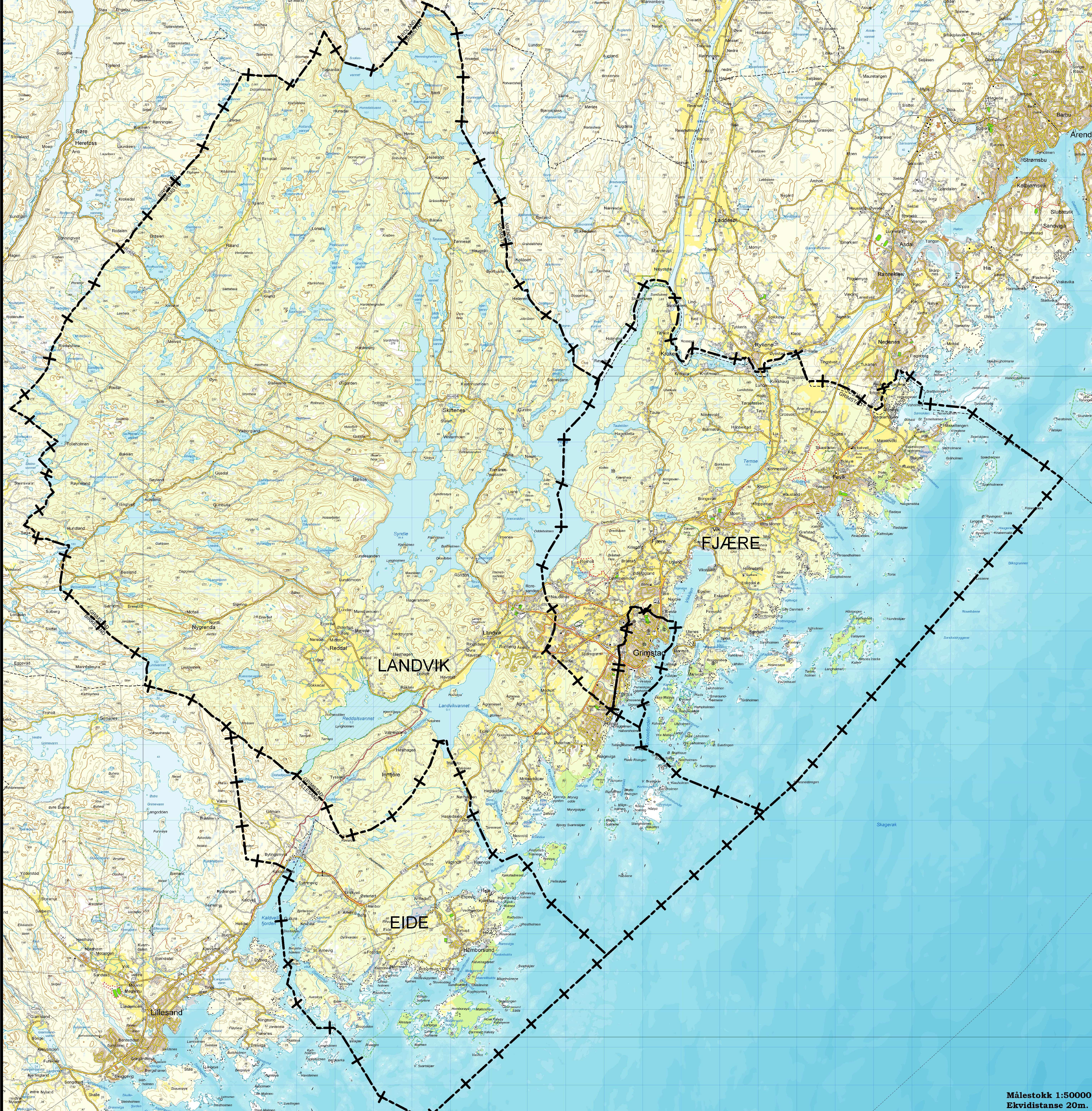
Map of Landvik Municipality
(also showing Eide, Fjære, and Grimstad municipalities)

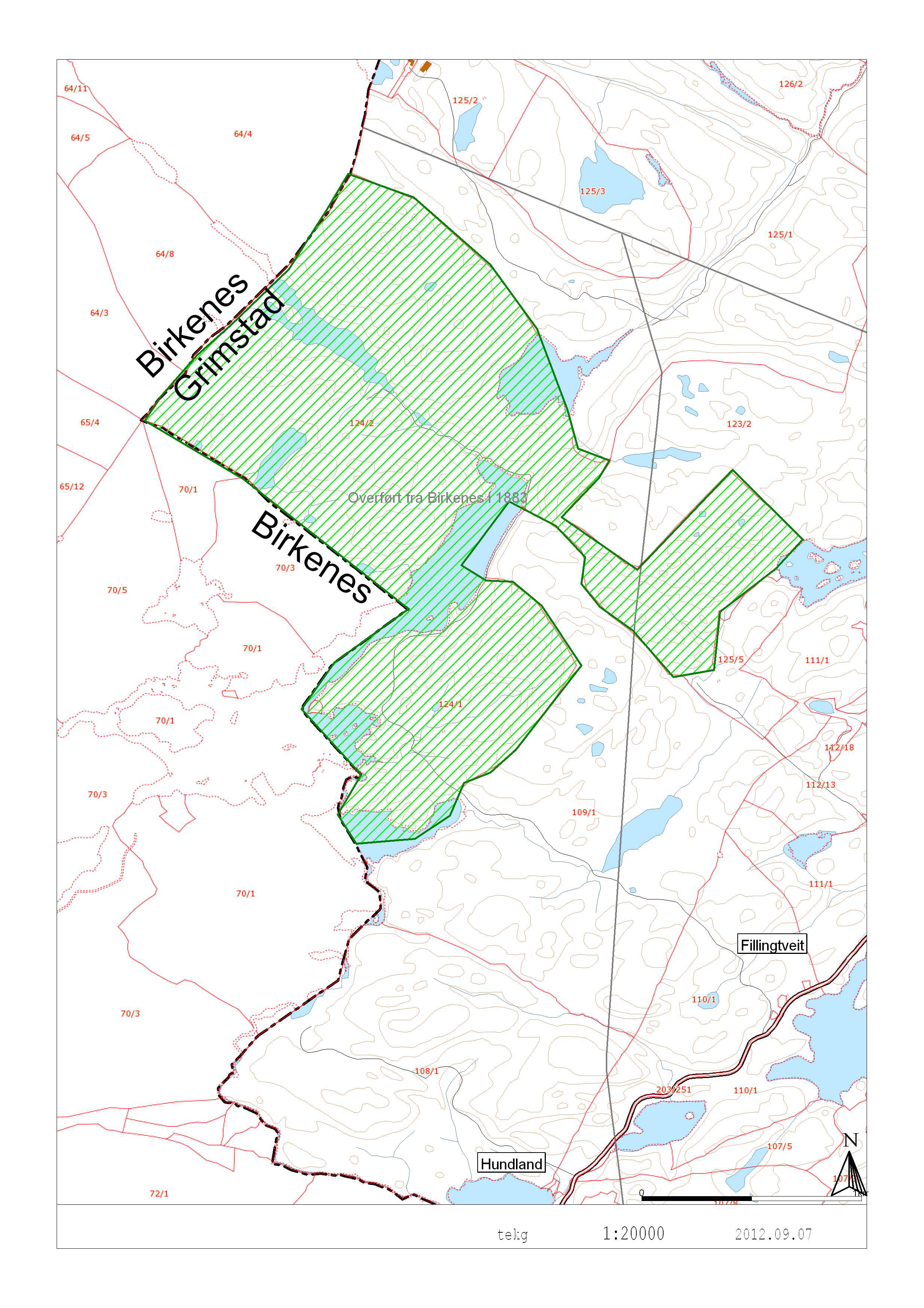
The area of Birkenes Municipality that was transferred to Landvik Municipality in 1883

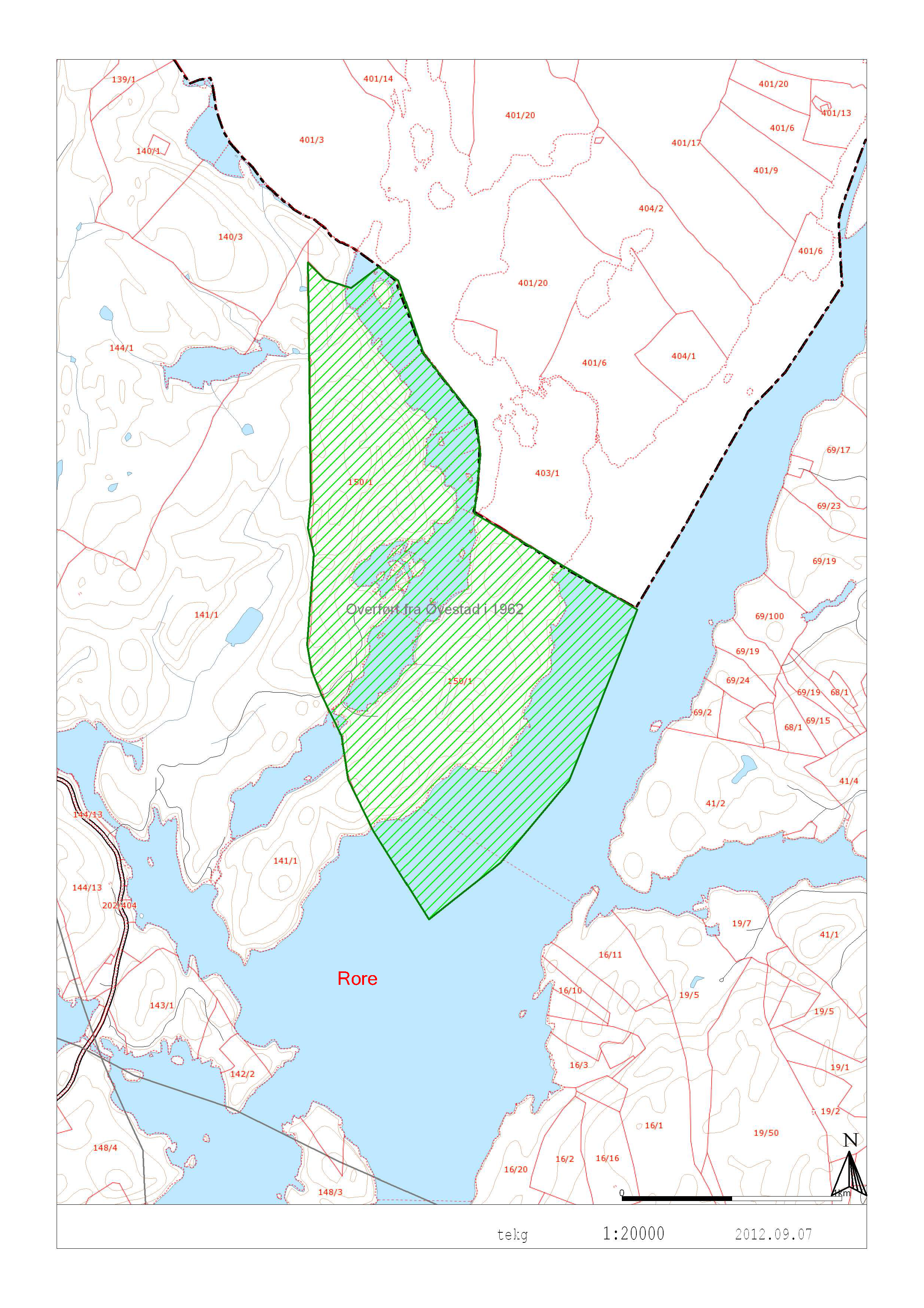
The Salveskjenn area of Øyestad Municipality that was transferred to Landvik Municipality in 1962

=== Administrative centre ===
Originally, the municipal council met at the Torp farm in the village of Reddal. Starting in the 1840s, the council met at the Landvik farm near the Landvik Church. In 1876, the council began meeting at the Vikmarken school, just south of the village of Roresand. In 1956, the municipal council began meeting at the new Landvik herredshus in Roresand.

=== Name ===
The municipality (originally the parish) was first named after the old Hommedal farm (Old Norse: Humludalr) since the local priest lived on that farm. The first element was the old name for a local river, Humla. That is the genitive case of the word humli which is the name of the "humulus" plant. The last element is dalr which means "valley" or "dale". The municipality and parish used the name Hommedal from 1838 until 1865 when the municipal (but not the parish name) was changed to "Landvig".

The new name came from the neighboring Landvig farm since the historic Landvik Church was located there. The first element is land which means "land" or "district". The last element comes from the word vík which means "bay" or "inlet". The farm is located on a bay on the northeast side of the lake Landvikvannet. In the early 20th century the spelling was adjusted to Landvik, to use a more Norwegianized spelling rather than the old Danish spelling.

=== Churches ===
The Church of Norway had one parish (sokn) within Landvik Municipality. At the time of the municipal dissolution, it was part of the Hommedal prestegjeld and the Vest-Nedenes prosti (deanery) in the Diocese of Agder.

Churches in Landvik Municipality
Parish (sokn)	Church name	Location of the church	Year built
Landvik	Landvik Church	Roresand	1825

== Geography ==
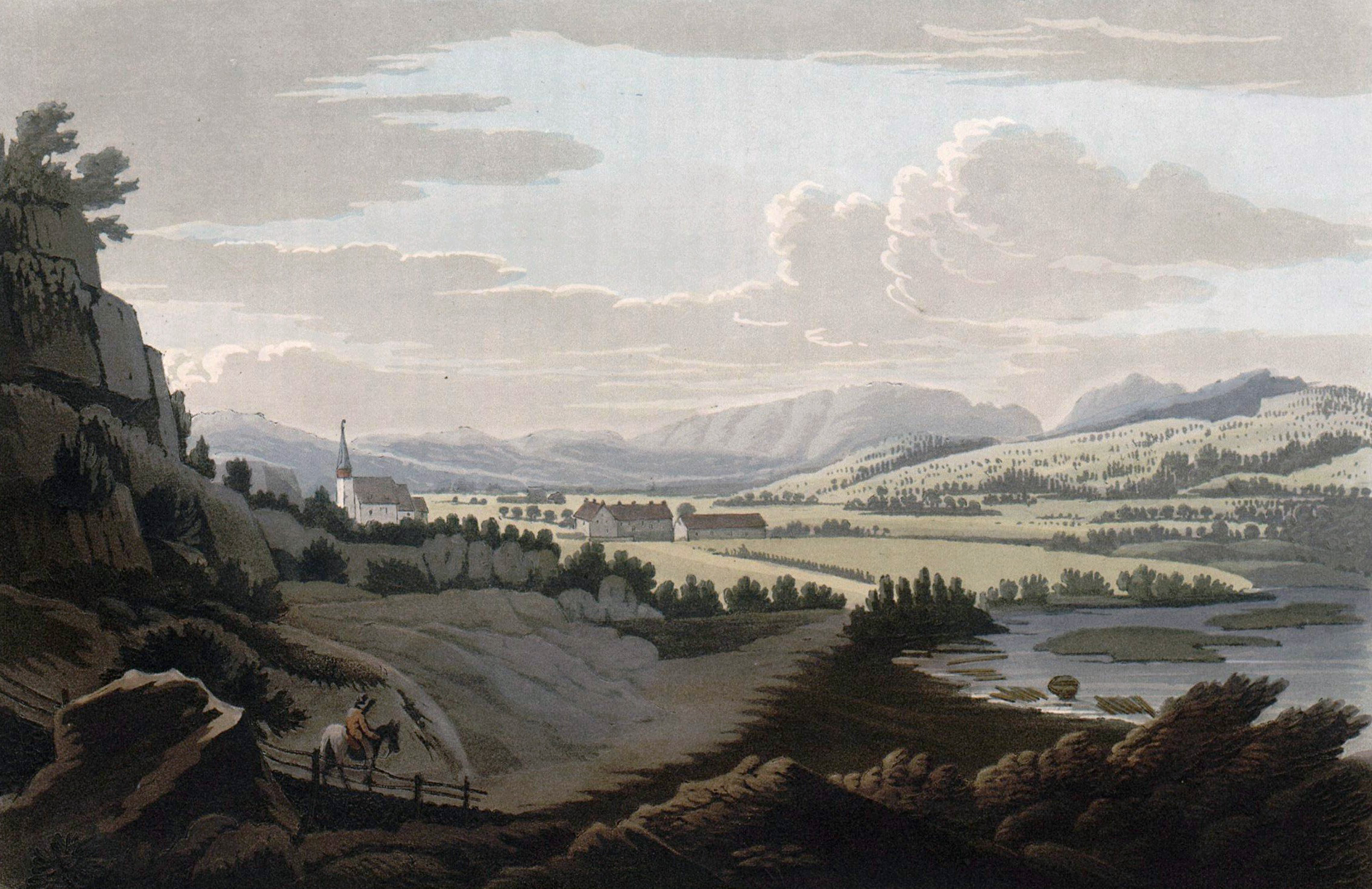
Painting of the Landvik area Credit: John William Edy (1800)

The municipality has several large lakes including Syndle, Reddalsvannet, Rore, and Landvikvannet. The highest point in the municipality was the 361.64-metre (1,186.5 ft) tall mountain Dobbedalshei which is located in the northern part of the municipality. Herefoss Municipality was located to the north, Øyestad Municipality was located to the northeast, Fjære Municipality was located to the east, the Skagerrak was located to the southeast, Eide Municipality was located to the south, Vestre Moland Municipality was located to the southwest, and Birkenes Municipality was located to the west.

== Government ==
While it existed, Landvik Municipality was responsible for primary education (through 10th grade), outpatient health services, senior citizen services, welfare and other social services, zoning, economic development, and municipal roads and utilities. The municipality was governed by a municipal council of directly elected representatives. The mayor was indirectly elected by a vote of the municipal council. The municipality was under the jurisdiction of the Sand District Court and the Agder Court of Appeal.

=== Municipal council ===
The municipal council (Kommunestyre) of Landvik Municipality was made up of 21 representatives that were elected to four year terms. The tables below show the historical composition of the council by political party.

Landvik kommunestyre 1967–1971
Party name (in Nynorsk)	Number of representatives
Labour Party (Arbeidarpartiet)	6
Conservative Party (Høgre)	3
Christian Democratic Party (Kristeleg Folkeparti)	2
Centre Party (Senterpartiet)	7
Liberal Party (Venstre)	3
Total number of members:	21
Note: On 1 January 1972, Landvik Municipality became part of Grimstad Municipality.

Landvik heradsstyre 1963–1967
Party name (in Nynorsk)	Number of representatives
Labour Party (Arbeidarpartiet)	6
Conservative Party (Høgre)	4
Christian Democratic Party (Kristeleg Folkeparti)	2
Centre Party (Senterpartiet)	6
Liberal Party (Venstre)	3
Total number of members:	21

Landvik heradsstyre 1959–1963
Party name (in Nynorsk)	Number of representatives
Labour Party (Arbeidarpartiet)	4
Conservative Party (Høgre)	2
Christian Democratic Party (Kristeleg Folkeparti)	2
Centre Party (Senterpartiet)	6
Liberal Party (Venstre)	3
Total number of members:	17

Landvik heradsstyre 1955–1959
Party name (in Nynorsk)	Number of representatives
Labour Party (Arbeidarpartiet)	4
Conservative Party (Høgre)	2
Christian Democratic Party (Kristeleg Folkeparti)	2
Farmers' Party (Bondepartiet)	6
Liberal Party (Venstre)	3
Total number of members:	17

Landvik heradsstyre 1951–1955
Party name (in Nynorsk)	Number of representatives
Labour Party (Arbeidarpartiet)	5
Conservative Party (Høgre)	2
Farmers' Party (Bondepartiet)	5
Liberal Party (Venstre)	4
Total number of members:	16

Landvik heradsstyre 1947–1951
Party name (in Nynorsk)	Number of representatives
Labour Party (Arbeidarpartiet)	5
Conservative Party (Høgre)	2
Farmers' Party (Bondepartiet)	4
Joint list of the Liberal Party (Venstre) and the Radical People's Party (Radikale Folkepartiet)	5
Total number of members:	16

Landvik heradsstyre 1945–1947
Party name (in Nynorsk)	Number of representatives
Labour Party (Arbeidarpartiet)	5
Conservative Party (Høgre)	2
Farmers' Party (Bondepartiet)	5
Joint list of the Liberal Party (Venstre) and the Radical People's Party (Radikale Folkepartiet)	4
Total number of members:	16

Landvik heradsstyre 1937–1941*
Party name (in Nynorsk)	Number of representatives
Labour Party (Arbeidarpartiet)	3
Conservative Party (Høgre)	4
Farmers' Party (Bondepartiet)	4
Liberal Party (Venstre)	5
Total number of members:	16
Note: Due to the German occupation of Norway during World War II, no elections were held for new municipal councils until after the war ended in 1945.

=== Mayors ===
The mayor (Nynorsk: ordførar) of Landvik Municipality was the political leader of the municipality and the chairperson of the municipal council. The following people have held this position:

- 1838–1839: Johannes Jensen Indtjore
- 1840–1841: Gjeruld Rasmussen Hunsdal
- 1842–1847: Thomas Pedersen Hardeberg
- 1848–1850: Terje Terjesen Stalleland, Sr.
- 1850–1851: Gjeruld Rasmussen Hunsdal
- 1852–1855: Ole Terjesen Gurebu
- 1856–1857: Terje Terjesen Stalleland, Sr.
- 1858–1861: Thomas Pedersen Hardeberg
- 1862–1863: Kittel Igeland
- 1864–1867: Peder Thomassen Hardeberg
- 1868–1869: Aanen Bentsen Morvig
- 1870–1873: Salve Gjeruldsen Hørte
- 1874–1875: Peder Thomassen Hardeberg
- 1876–1897: Nils Pedersen Igland
- 1898–1898: Terje Terjesen Stalleland, Jr.
- 1899–1904: Nils Jacobsen Molland
- 1905–1913: Bendiks Knudsen Imenes (H)
- 1914–1919: Carl Udjus
- 1920–1928: Knut Birkedal
- 1929–1934: Lars Torp
- 1935–1941: Nils Neset (V)
- 1941–1943: Nils Johan Igland (NS)
- 1943–1945: Erik Nesbu (NS)
- 1945–1945: Nils Neset (V)
- 1945–1947: Nils Gauslå (V)
- 1947–1951: Nils Neset (V)
- 1951–1955: Nils Gauslå (V)
- 1955–1963: Per Løland (Bp)
- 1963–1965: Nils Torp
- 1965–1967: Hans Birkenes (Sp)
- 1967–1970: Per Løland (Sp)

== See also ==
- List of former municipalities of Norway
