= Reidar Haave Olsen =

Norwegian pilot (1923–1944)

Reidar Haave Olsen (7 November 1923 – 19 February 1944) was a Norwegian pilot who was killed during World War II.

He was born in Landvik Municipality, but settled in the neighboring Eide Municipality. During World War II, he took a pilot's education in Canada, before enlisting in the Norwegian Army Air Service-in-exile in England. He was recorded with 101 flights through hostile area, and was credited with shooting down four enemy aircraft. He died in an aircraft accident near Epping, England, in February 1944. He was decorated with the St. Olav's Medal With Oak Branch.
