= Eid Church =

Eid Church or Eide Church may refer:

== Churches in Norway ==
- Eid Church (Kvinnherad), in Kvinnherad municipality in Vestland county
- Eid Church (Nordfjord), in Stad municipality in Vestland county
- Eid Church (Rauma), in Rauma municipality in Møre og Romsdal county
- Eide Church (Agder), in Grimstad municipality in Agder county
- Eide Church (Møre og Romsdal), in Hustadvika municipality in Møre og Romsdal county
