= Eide Municipality (Aust-Agder) =

Former municipality in Aust-Agder, Norway

Eide Municipality Eide herred
- Former municipality
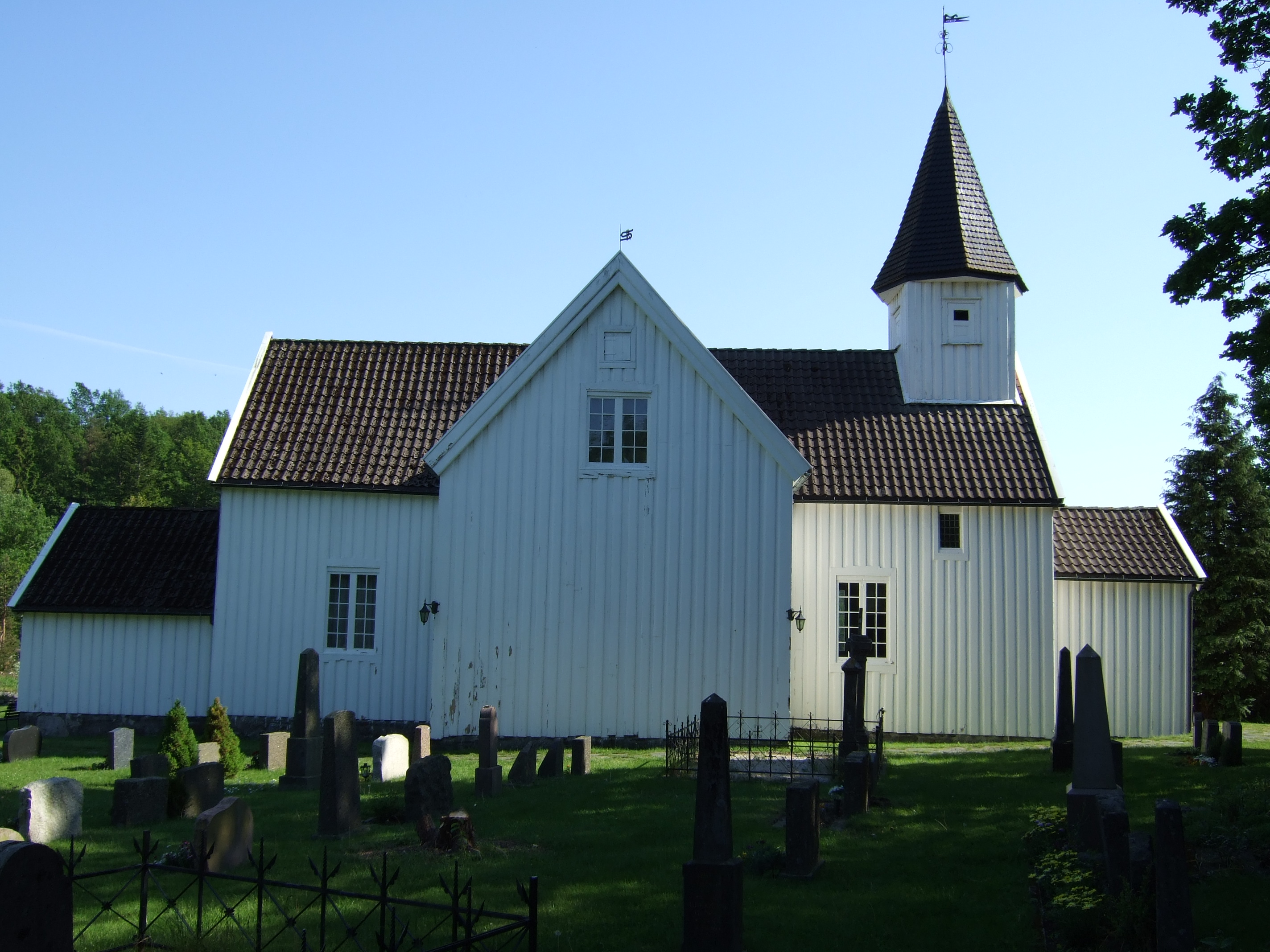
- View of Eide Church

- Aust-Agder within Norway

- Eide within Aust-Agder
- Coordinates: 58°16′11″N 08°28′41″E
- Country: Norway
- County: Aust-Agder
- District: Østre Agder
- Established: 1 Jan 1838
  - Created as: Formannskapsdistrikt
- Disestablished: 1 Jan 1962
  - Succeeded by: Landvik Municipality
- Administrative centre: Eide

Government
  - Mayor (1960–1961): Anton Ødegaard

Area (upon dissolution)
  - Total: 29.8 km^{2} (11.5 sq mi)
  - Rank: #646 in Norway
- Highest elevation: 235 m (771 ft)

Population (1961)
  - Total: 510
  - Rank: #720 in Norway
  - Density: 17.1/km^{2} (44/sq mi)
  - Change (10 years): ▼ −8.1%
- Demonym: Eidesokning

Official language
  - Norwegian form: Bokmål
- Time zone: UTC+01:00 (CET)
  - Summer (DST): UTC+02:00 (CEST)
- ISO 3166 code: NO-0925

Eide is a former municipality in the old Aust-Agder county, Norway. The 29.8-square-kilometre (11.5 sq mi) municipality existed from 1838 until its dissolution in 1962. The area is now divided between Lillesand Municipality and Grimstad Municipality in the traditional district of Østre Agder in Agder county. The administrative centre was the village of Eide where Eide Church is located. Other villages in the municipality included Jortveit and Homborsund.

Prior to its dissolution in 1962, the 29.8-square-kilometre (11.5 sq mi) municipality was the 646th largest by area out of the 731 municipalities in Norway. Eide Municipality was the 720th most populous municipality in Norway with a population of about 510. The municipality's population density was 17.1 inhabitants per square kilometre (44/sq mi) and its population had decreased by 8.1% over the previous 10-year period.

== General information ==
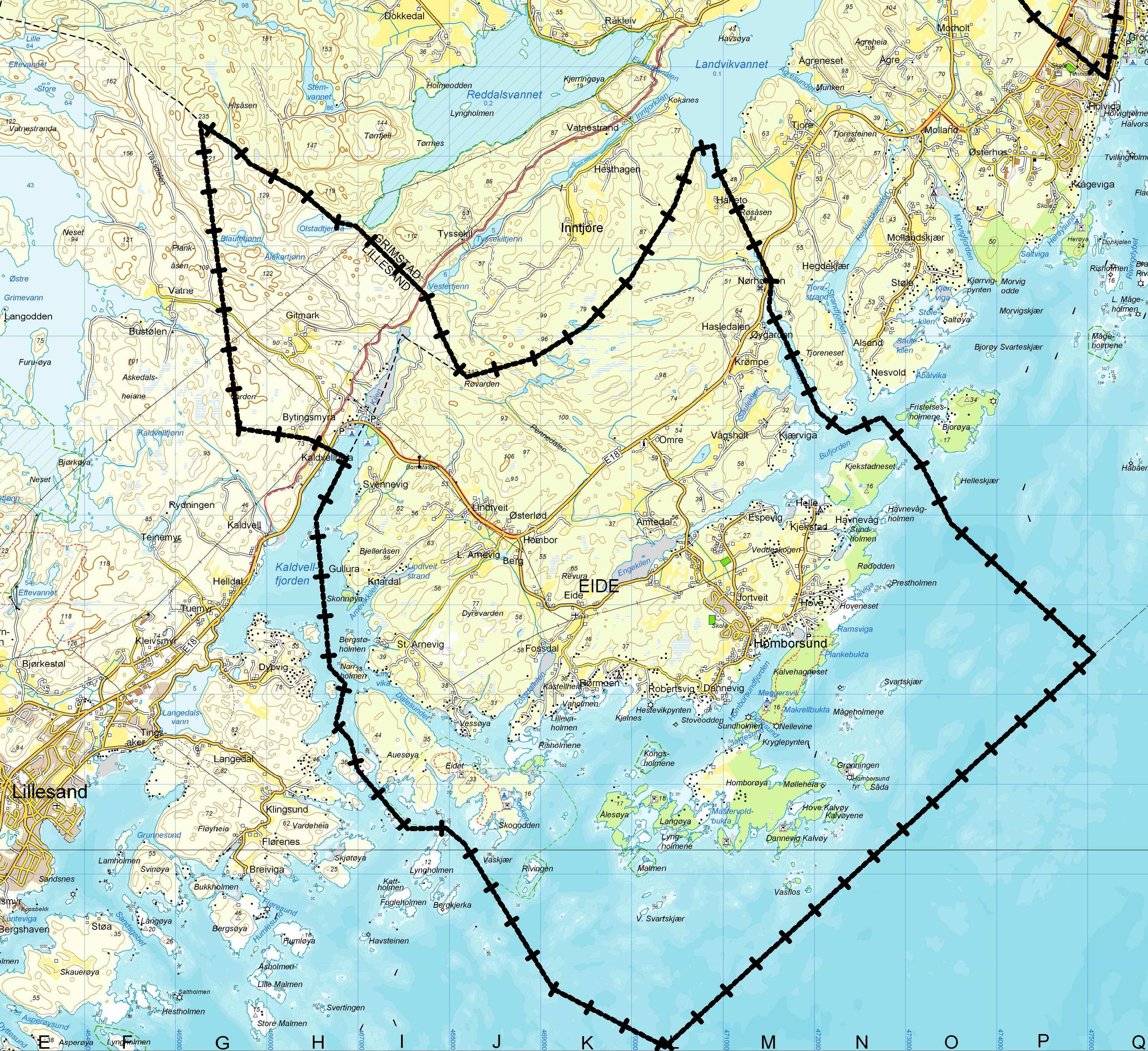
Map of Eide Municipality.

The parish of Eide was established as a municipality on 1 January 1838 (see formannskapsdistrikt law).

During the 1960s, there were many municipal mergers across Norway due to the work of the Schei Committee. On 1 January 1962, the Gitmark farm area (population: 22) was transferred to the neighboring Lillesand Municipality. On the same date, the rest of Eide Municipality was dissolved and the following areas were merged to form an enlarged Landvik Municipality:

- the rest of Eide Municipality (population: 504)
- all of Landvik Municipality (population: 1,929)
- the Salvestjønn area of Øyestad Municipality (population: 0)

Later, on 1 January 1971, all of Landvik Municipality was incorporated into Grimstad Municipality.

=== Name ===
The municipality (originally the parish) is named after the old Eide farm (Old Norse: Eiði) since the first Eide Church was built there. The name is the dative case of the word eið which means "isthmus". This is because the farm (and church) is located between two bodies of water: the Fosdalskilen and Engekilen.

=== Churches ===
The Church of Norway had one parish (sokn) within Eide Municipality. At the time of the municipal dissolution, it was part of the Hommedal prestegjeld and the Vest-Nedenes prosti (deanery) in the Diocese of Agder.

Churches in Eide Municipality
Parish (sokn)	Church name	Location of the church	Year built
Eide	Eide Church	Eide	1795

== Geography ==
The small municipality included some coastal land on the mainland plus nearly 70 small islands off the Skaggerak coast. The larger islands include Auseøya, Homborøya, and Ålesøya. The highest point in the municipality was the 235-metre (771 ft) tall mountain Hisåsen, a tripoint on the borders of Eide Municipality, Vestre Moland Municipality, and Landvik Municipality. Landvik Municipality was located to the north, the Skagerrak was located to the east and south, and Vestre Moland Municipality was located to the west.

== Government ==
While it existed, Eide Municipality was responsible for primary education (through 10th grade), outpatient health services, senior citizen services, welfare and other social services, zoning, economic development, and municipal roads and utilities. The municipality was governed by a municipal council of directly elected representatives. The mayor was indirectly elected by a vote of the municipal council. The municipality was under the jurisdiction of the Sand District Court and the Agder Court of Appeal.

=== Municipal council ===
The municipal council (Herredsstyre) of Eide Municipality was made up of 13 representatives that were elected to four year terms. The tables below show the historical composition of the council by political party.

Eide herredsstyre 1959–1961
Party name (in Norwegian)	Number of representatives
Labour Party (Arbeiderpartiet)	2
Conservative Party (Høyre)	4
Centre Party (Senterpartiet)	7
Total number of members:	13
Note: On 1 January 1962, Eide Municipality became part of Landvik Municipality.

Eide herredsstyre 1955–1959
Party name (in Norwegian)	Number of representatives
Labour Party (Arbeiderpartiet)	2
Conservative Party (Høyre)	4
Farmers' Party (Bondepartiet)	6
Liberal Party (Venstre)	1
Total number of members:	13

Eide herredsstyre 1951–1955
Party name (in Norwegian)	Number of representatives
Labour Party (Arbeiderpartiet)	2
Joint List(s) of Non-Socialist Parties (Borgerlige Felleslister)	10
Total number of members:	12

Eide herredsstyre 1947–1951
Party name (in Norwegian)	Number of representatives
Labour Party (Arbeiderpartiet)	2
Joint List(s) of Non-Socialist Parties (Borgerlige Felleslister)	10
Total number of members:	12

Eide herredsstyre 1945–1947
Party name (in Norwegian)	Number of representatives
Labour Party (Arbeiderpartiet)	2
Joint List(s) of Non-Socialist Parties (Borgerlige Felleslister)	10
Total number of members:	12

Eide herredsstyre 1937–1941*
Party name (in Norwegian)	Number of representatives
Labour Party (Arbeiderpartiet)	2
Joint List(s) of Non-Socialist Parties (Borgerlige Felleslister)	10
Total number of members:	12
Note: Due to the German occupation of Norway during World War II, no elections were held for new municipal councils until after the war ended in 1945.

=== Mayors ===
The mayor (Norwegian: ordfører) of Eide Municipality was the political leader of the municipality and the chairperson of the municipal council. The following people have held this position:

- 1838–1839: Christian Christensen Arnevig
- 1840–1841: Svenning Thomassen Jortveit
- 1842–1845: Severin Anstensen Hove
- 1846–1849: Niels Nielsen Enge
- 1850–1851: Severin Anstensen Hove
- 1852–1855: Jens Aslagsen Gitmark
- 1856–1857: Henrik Andersen Vaagsholt
- 1858–1861: Severin Anstensen Hove
- 1862–1865: Paul Jensen Vaagsholt
- 1866–1869: Christopher Olsen Vaagsholt
- 1870–1871: Daniel M. Svennevig
- 1872–1873: Anders Eriksen Gitmark
- 1874–1875: Peter Pedersen Nørholmen
- 1876–1877: Peder Richmann
- 1878–1881: Jens Olsen Vaagsholt
- 1882–1891: Karl E. Gjertsen
- 1892–1910: Anders Gundersen Forseth
- 1911–1913: Andreas Cornelius Olsen
- 1914–1919: Lars Pedersen Ødegaard
- 1920–1922: Martin Forsdal
- 1923–1931: Lauritz Wilhelm Olsen
- 1932–1934: Hans J. Eide
- 1935–1940: Elling Arnevig
- 1941–1944: Tellef Retterstøl (NS)
- 1945–1947: Elling Arnevig
- 1948–1955: Anton Ødegaard
- 1956–1959: Jacob Svennevig
- 1960–1961: Anton Ødegaard

== Notable people ==
- Reidar Haave Olsen (1923-1944), a pilot

== See also ==
- List of former municipalities of Norway
