= Eidet =

Eidet is Norwegian for isthmus. The name may refer to many places in Norway:

- Eide, Bø, a village in Bø municipality in Nordland county (also called Eidet)
- Eide, Nordland, a village in Tysfjord municipality in Nordland county
- Eidet, Lierne, a village in Lierne municipality in Trøndelag county
- Eidet, Hemne, a village in Hemne municipality in Trøndelag county
- Eidet, Troms, a village in Måselv municipality in Troms county

== See also ==
- Eide (disambiguation)
