= Nygrenda =

Village in Grimstad Municipality, Norway

- Village
- Interactive map of Nygrenda
- Coordinates: 58.3449°N 08.3946°E
- Country: Norway
- Region: Southern Norway
- County: Agder
- District: Østre Agder
- Municipality: Grimstad Municipality
- Elevation: 193 m (633 ft)
- Time zone: UTC+01:00 (CET)
  - Summer (DST): UTC+02:00 (CEST)
- Post Code: 4886 Grimstad

Nygrenda is a village in Grimstad Municipality in Agder county, Norway. The village is located in the far western, rural part of the municipality, about 5 kilometres (3.1 mi) west of the village of Reddal.
