= Reddal =

Village in Grimstad Municipality, Norway

- Village
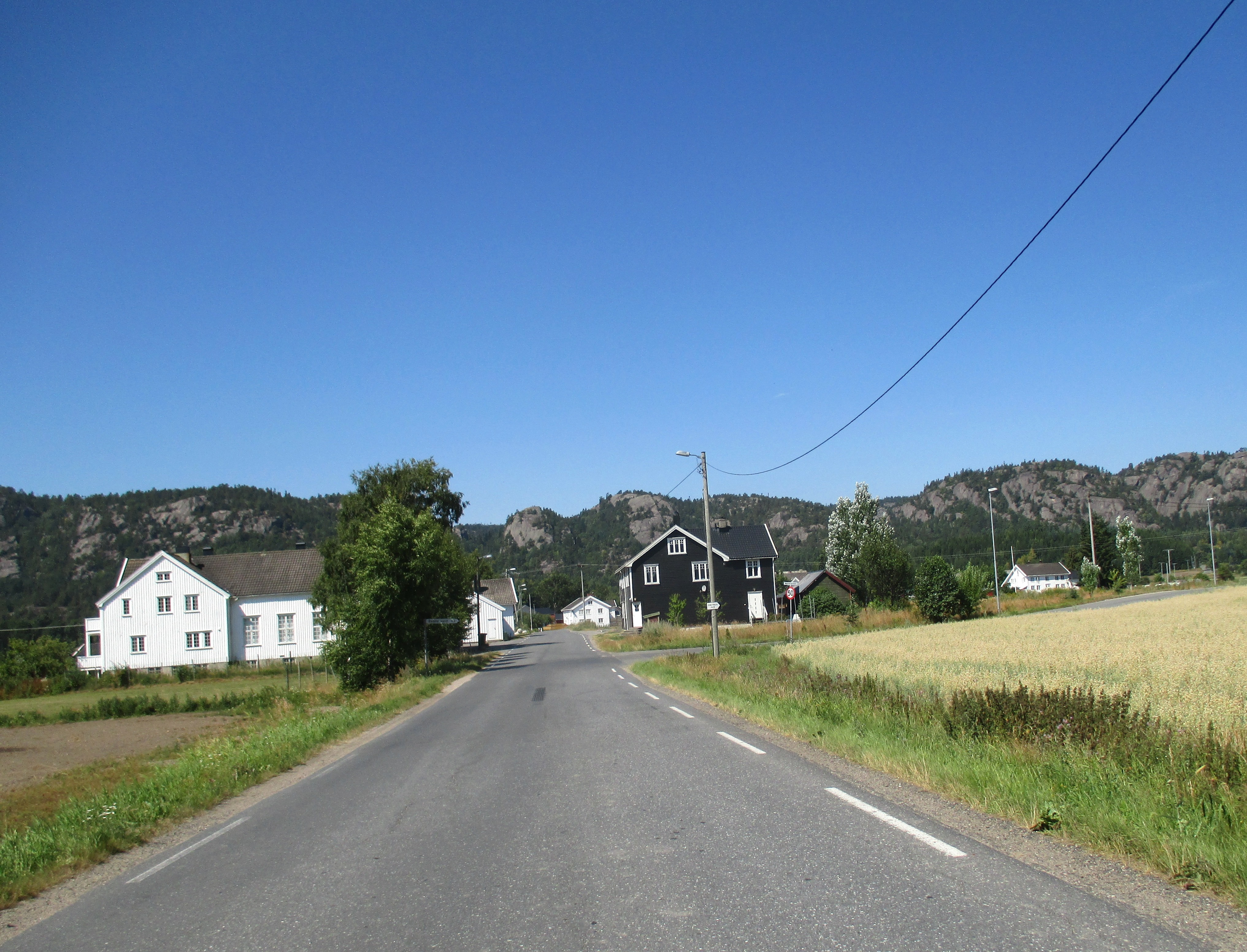
- View of the village
- Interactive map of Reddal
- Coordinates: 58.3351°N 08.4472°E
- Country: Norway
- Region: Southern Norway
- County: Agder
- District: Østre Agder
- Municipality: Grimstad Municipality
- Elevation: 7 m (23 ft)
- Time zone: UTC+01:00 (CET)
  - Summer (DST): UTC+02:00 (CEST)
- Post Code: 4886 Grimstad

Reddal is a village in Grimstad Municipality in Agder county, Norway. It is located in the rural western part of the municipality, about 10 kilometres (6.2 mi) west of the town of Grimstad and about 5 kilometres (3.1 mi) southeast of the small village of Nygrenda. The main industry in the village is agriculture, with the most important products being potatoes, berries, and grains. The large lake Syndle lies just north of the village.

The freshwater Reddalsvannet lake is located along the south side of the village area. There is a protected nature reserve at the lake. In order to gain additional farmland in Reddal, a canal was built in 1877 to lower the lake's water level by 4 metres (13 ft). This lowered the water down to sea level. The Reddal Canal (Norwegian: Reddalskanalen) connects the Reddalsvannet lake and the nearby Landviksvannet lake to the sea. Today, the canal is popular with small boats.

== Climate ==
Climate data for Landvik 1991–2020 (6 m, average highs/lows 1998-2025, extremes 1957–2020)
Month	Jan	Feb	Mar	Apr	May	Jun	Jul	Aug	Sep	Oct	Nov	Dec	Year
Record high °C (°F)	12.8 (55.0)	18.7 (65.7)	23.1 (73.6)	24.2 (75.6)	27.7 (81.9)	31.2 (88.2)	30.8 (87.4)	32.2 (90.0)	27.3 (81.1)	21.9 (71.4)	16.8 (62.2)	13.8 (56.8)	32.2 (90.0)
Mean daily maximum °C (°F)	3.1 (37.6)	3.9 (39.0)	6.9 (44.4)	11.1 (52.0)	16 (61)	19.8 (67.6)	21.6 (70.9)	20.5 (68.9)	17.2 (63.0)	11.8 (53.2)	7.2 (45.0)	4.1 (39.4)	11.9 (53.5)
Daily mean °C (°F)	0.1 (32.2)	0.1 (32.2)	2.4 (36.3)	6.4 (43.5)	11.2 (52.2)	14.8 (58.6)	16.9 (62.4)	16.1 (61.0)	12.7 (54.9)	8 (46)	4.2 (39.6)	1.2 (34.2)	7.8 (46.1)
Mean daily minimum °C (°F)	−3 (27)	−2.6 (27.3)	−1.1 (30.0)	2.3 (36.1)	6.4 (43.5)	10.3 (50.5)	12.5 (54.5)	11.8 (53.2)	9.5 (49.1)	4.8 (40.6)	1.5 (34.7)	−1.9 (28.6)	4.2 (39.6)
Record low °C (°F)	−27.5 (−17.5)	−30.3 (−22.5)	−23.2 (−9.8)	−11.6 (11.1)	−2.6 (27.3)	0 (32)	3.5 (38.3)	3.5 (38.3)	−0.8 (30.6)	−8.1 (17.4)	−23.1 (−9.6)	−24 (−11)	−30.3 (−22.5)
Average precipitation mm (inches)	144.6 (5.69)	97 (3.8)	91.5 (3.60)	69.1 (2.72)	80.5 (3.17)	88.4 (3.48)	89.2 (3.51)	125.8 (4.95)	137.9 (5.43)	175.1 (6.89)	169.6 (6.68)	147.4 (5.80)	1,416.1 (55.72)
Average precipitation days (≥ 1.0 mm)	24	21	19	17	14	16	13	14	14	20	21	21	214
Source 1: NOAA
Source 2: eklima/met.no database
