= Reddalsvannet =

Lake in Agder, Norway

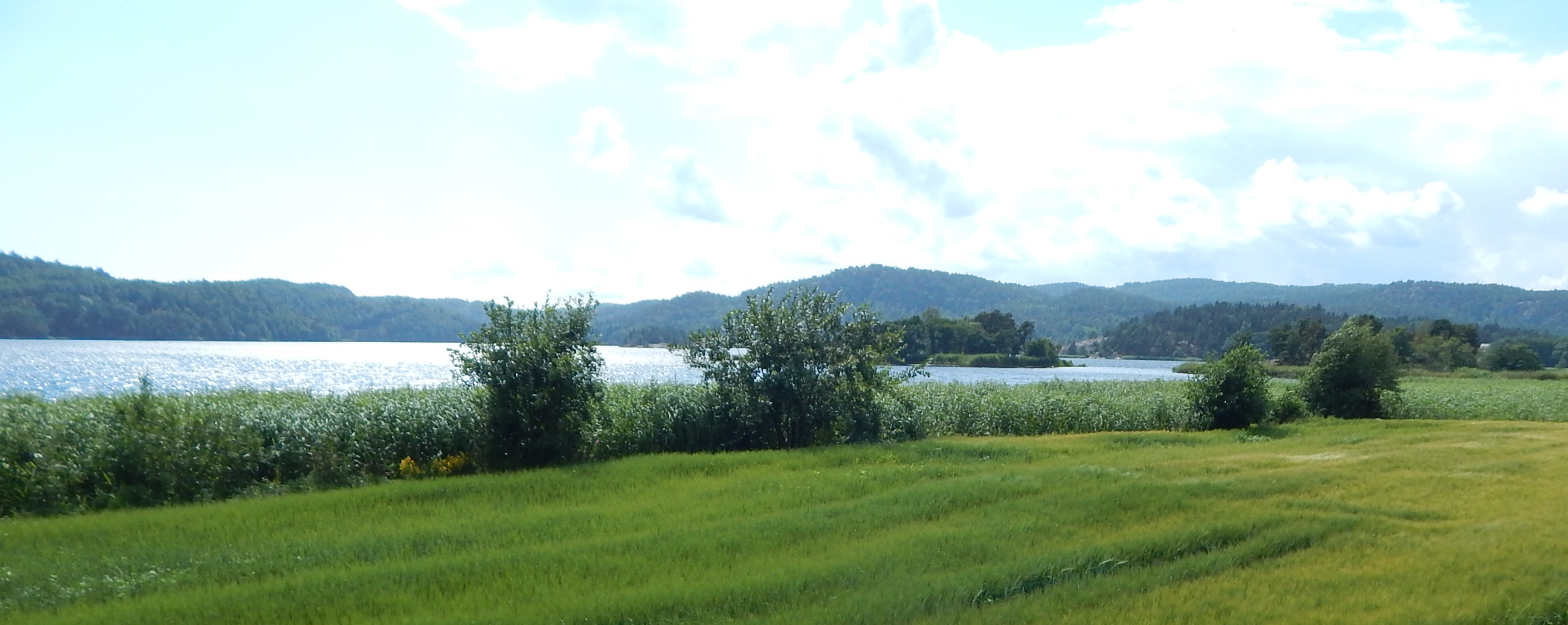
- View of the lake
- Location: Grimstad Municipality, Agder
- Coordinates: 58.32177°N 8.46233°E
- Basin countries: Norway
- Max. length: 3.7 kilometres (2.3 mi)
- Max. width: 1.1 kilometres (0.68 mi)
- Surface area: 2.25 km^{2} (0.87 sq mi)
- Surface elevation: 0 metres (0 ft)
- References: NVE

Location
- Interactive map of Reddalsvannet

Reddalsvannet is a lake in Grimstad Municipality in Agder county, Norway. The 2.25-square-kilometre (0.87 sq mi) lake lies about 6.5 kilometres (4.0 mi) southwest of the town of Grimstad. The village of Reddal lies just north of the lake.

It is protected as a nature reserve because of its large bird population. The lake is connected to the sea via the Reddal Canal which has two parts: one part connects it to the neighboring Landvikvannet and the other part connects that lake to the Skagerrak. The canal was built in 1877. At that time, the water in the lake Reddalsvannet was lowered down to sea level which created about 3,000 decares (3.0 km^{2}; 1.2 sq mi) of new arable land along the lake shore. (Other sources say it was only 1,300 decares (1.3 km^{2}; 320 acres) of land that was gained.)

The lake is home to pike, whitefish, rudd, perch, and eel.

== See also ==
- List of lakes in Norway
