= Landvikvannet =

Lake in Agder, Norway

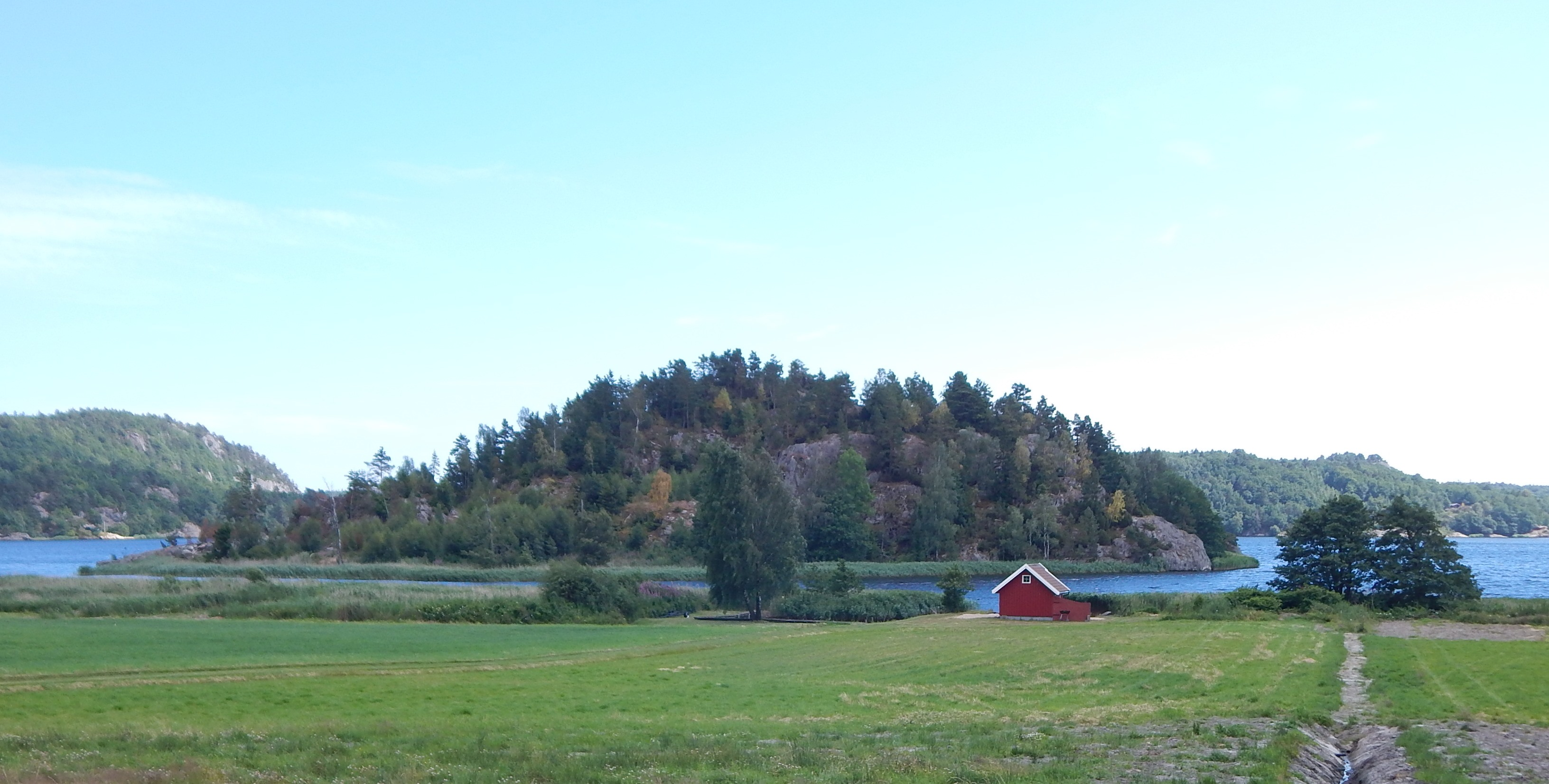
- View of the lake
- Location: Grimstad Municipality, Agder
- Coordinates: 58.32476°N 8.50792°E
- Primary inflows: Reddalsvannet
- Primary outflows: Strandfjorden
- Catchment area: 51 square kilometres (20 sq mi)
- Basin countries: Norway
- Max. length: 3.3 kilometres (2.1 mi)
- Max. width: 1 kilometre (0.62 mi)
- Surface area: 2.2 km^{2} (0.85 sq mi)
- Max. depth: 25 metres (82 ft)
- Surface elevation: 0 metres (0 ft)
- References: NVE

Location
- Interactive map of Landvikvannet

Landvikvannet is a lake in Grimstad Municipality in Agder county, Norway. The 2.2-square-kilometre (0.85 sq mi) is located about 4 kilometres (2.5 mi) southwest of the town of Grimstad. The Landvik Church is located about 500 metres (1,600 ft) from the northeastern shore of the lake. The lake Landvikvannet has been connected to the Skagerrak sea via the Reddal Canal since 1877. The lake is also connected to the Reddalsvannet lake to the northwest via the same canal.

The water in the lake reaches a maximum depth of 25 metres (82 ft), and has no oxygen content below 4–5 metres (13–16 ft). The top 2 metres (6 ft 7 in) of water is freshwater and below that point the salt content increases. At a depth of about 20 metres (66 ft), the water is about 2% salt (the ocean is about 3.5% salt).

The lake is rather unique because it has both freshwater and saltwater fish. The most common fish species in Landvikvannet are herring, rudd, and trout, but lavaret, perch, flounder, and crab have also been found. Herring has not been detected in any other freshwater lake in Norway. Scientists do not know where the herring in Landvikvannet spawn, whether they do so in the water, or whether they travel out to sea and return. Genetic tests show that the herring differs from the North Sea herring. Freshwater shrimp have also been found in the lake.

== See also ==
- List of lakes in Norway
