= Eide, Agder =

Village in Grimstad Municipality, Norway

Eide
- Village
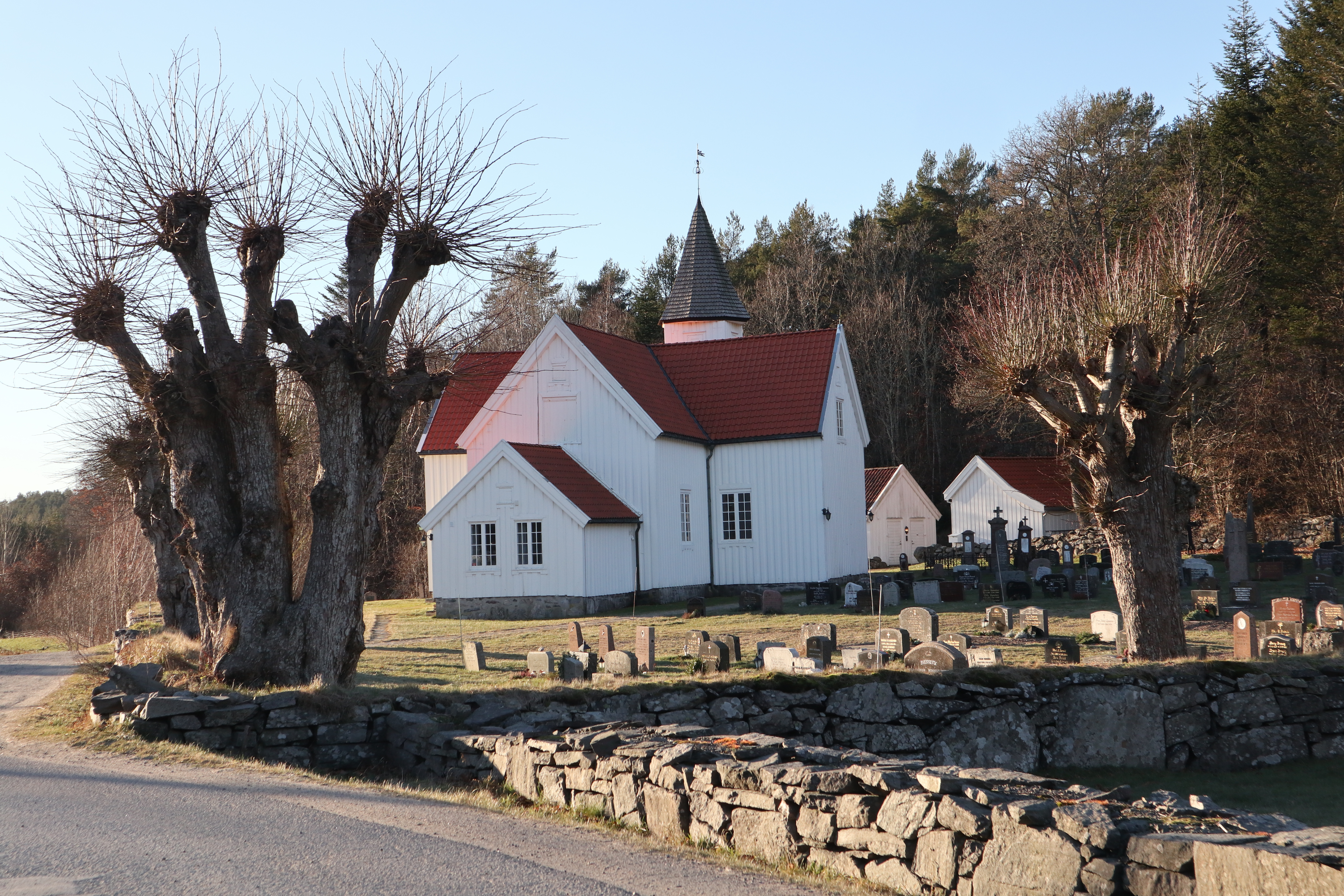
- View of the village church
- Interactive map of Eide
- Coordinates: 58.27013°N 8.47561°E
- Country: Norway
- Region: Southern Norway
- County: Agder
- District: Østre Agder
- Municipality: Grimstad Municipality
- Elevation: 29 m (95 ft)
- Time zone: UTC+01:00 (CET)
  - Summer (DST): UTC+02:00 (CEST)
- Post Code: 4887 Grimstad

Eide is a village in Grimstad Municipality in Agder county, Norway. The village is located along the Skagerrak coast, about 12 kilometres (7.5 mi) southwest of the town of Grimstad. The small villages of Homborsund and Jortveit both located about 2 kilometres (1.2 mi) to the east. Eide Church is located in this village.

== History ==
This village was the administrative centre of the old Eide Municipality which existed until 1962.
