= Eide (surname) =

Eide is a Norwegian surname. Notable people with the surname include:

- Anders Eide (born 1971), Norwegian cross-country skier
- Asbjørn Eide (born 1933), Norwegian human rights scholar
- Atle Eide (born 1957), Norwegian businessman
- Carl-Michael Eide (born 1974), Norwegian black metal musician
- Egil Eide (1868–1946), Norwegian silent film actor and director
- Espen Barth Eide (born 1964), Norway's Minister of Defense
- Espen Sommer Eide (born 1972), Norwegian composer and musician
- Gunn-Vivian Eide (born 1964), Norwegian politician for the Liberal Party
- Hans Engelsen Eide (born 1965), Norwegian freestyle skier
- Helge Eide (businessman) (born 1954), Norwegian businessman
- Helge Eide (politician) (born 1964), Norwegian politician for the Christian Democratic Party
- Ingrid Eide (born 1933), Norwegian sociologist, UN official, and politician for the Labour Party
- Johannes Eide (1937–2025), Norwegian businessman and philanthropist
- Kai Eide (born 1949), Norwegian diplomat
- Kjell Eide (1925–2011), Norwegian civil servant
- Kristin Eide, Norwegian handball player
- Linda Eide (born 1969), Norwegian television and radio presenter
- Lorentz Eide (1924–1992), American soldier and Olympic
- Mary Eide (1924–2013), Norwegian politician for the Labour Party
- Petter Eide (born 1959), Norwegian activist
- Reidar Eide (1940–1999), Norwegian motorcycle speedway rider
- Rigmor Andersen Eide (born 1954), Norwegian politician for the Christian Democratic Party
- Tracey Eide (born 1954), Democratic member of the Washington State (USA) Senate
- Vigleik Eide (1933–2011), Norwegian diplomat and military officer
