= Eid Church (Rauma) =

Church in Møre og Romsdal, Norway

- Eid kyrkje
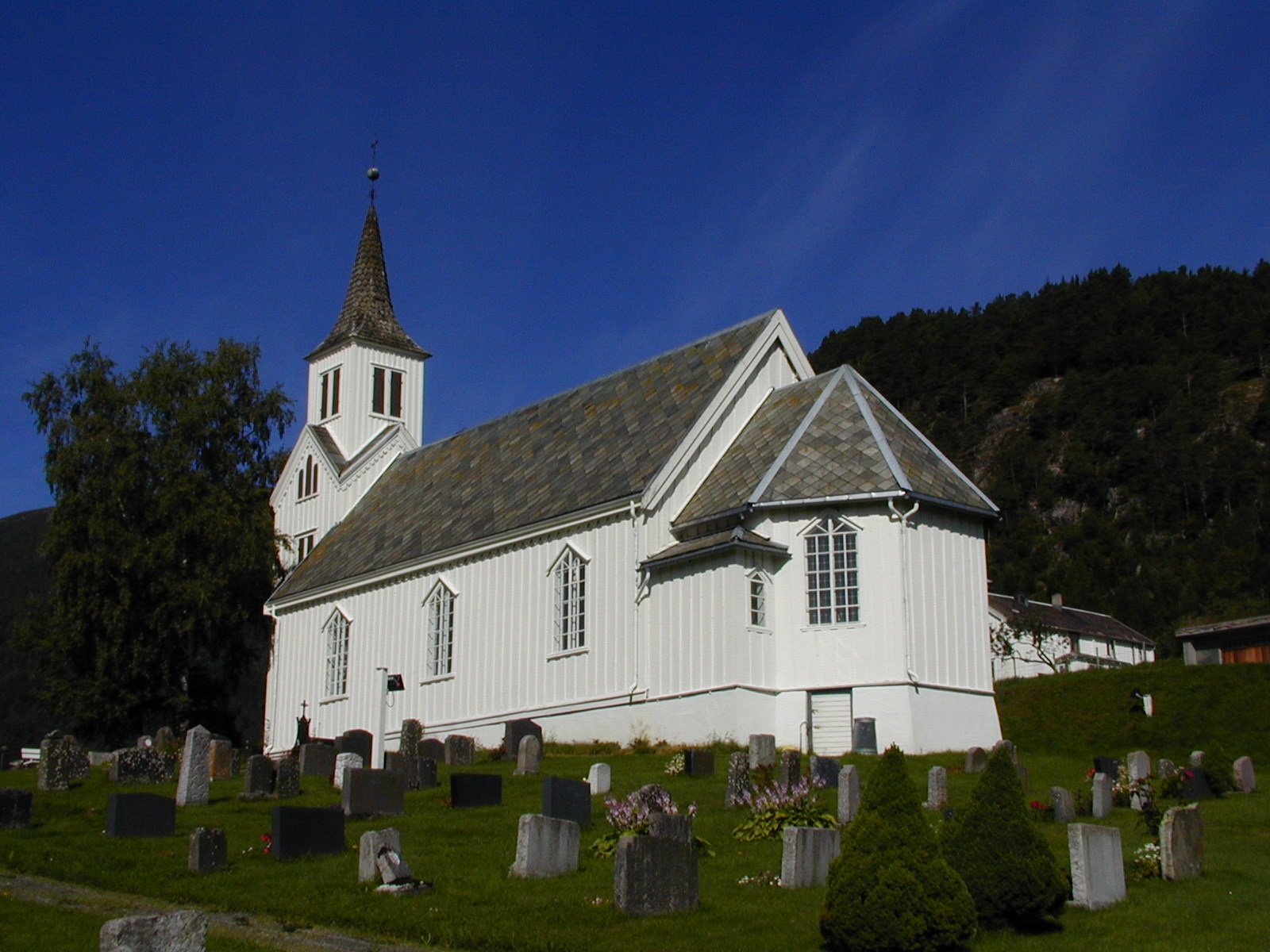
- View of the church
- Eid Church
- 62°35′23″N 7°29′50″E
- Location: Rauma Municipality, Møre og Romsdal
- Country: Norway
- Denomination: Church of Norway
- Churchmanship: Evangelical Lutheran

History
- Status: Parish church
- Founded: 13th century
- Consecrated: 9 Oct 1797

Architecture
- Functional status: Active
- Architectural type: Long church
- Completed: 1797 (229 years ago)

Specifications
- Capacity: 190
- Materials: Wood

Administration
- Diocese: Møre bispedømme
- Deanery: Indre Romsdal prosti
- Parish: Eid og Holm
- Norwegian Cultural Heritage Site
- Type: Church
- Status: Automatically protected
- ID: 84061

Eid Church (Norwegian: Eid kyrkje) is a parish church of the Church of Norway in Rauma Municipality in Møre og Romsdal county, Norway. It is located in the village of Eidsbygda. It is the main church for the Eid og Holm parish which is part of the Indre Romsdal prosti (deanery) in the Diocese of Møre. The white, wooden church was built in a long church design in 1797 using plans drawn up by an unknown architect. The church seats about 190 people.

== History ==
The earliest existing historical records of the church date back to 1589, but that was not the year it was built. The first church was a wooden stave church, located a few meters north of the present church site, that was possibly built during the 13th century. In 1796-1797, a new church was built just to the south of the old church. In August of 1797, the last services were held in the old church and then the record books state that seven weeks later on 9 October 1797 the new church was consecrated by Provost Krog from the nearby Veøy Church. This short window between indicates the old church likely was in use until the new church was almost completed. In 1872, the church was expanded to the east by incorporating the old choir as part of the nave and adding a new choir flanked by two sacristies. Two years later in 1874, a new roof was installed and a new church porch with a tower was built on the west side.

In 1915-1916, the church was thoroughly remodeled on the inside. During this renovation, it is said that remnants of old staves were found in the walls. This, combined with the fact that there was only a seven-week break in the services in August to October 1797, has been interpreted as meaning that the present church is actually a thoroughly rebuilt medieval stave church. This theory, however, has been found to be unlikely according to the Norwegian Directorate for Cultural Heritage.

== Interior ==
An altar frontal from 1275 (from the old church) was taken out of the church at some point and sent to be displayed at the Bergen Museum. This is one possible reasons why it is thought that the first church was built during the 13th century. The pulpit in the present church dates from 1668 and rises through the right part of the chancel opening. It originally was part of the previous church and was moved into the new church in 1797. The baptismal font is dated to 1519 and it was originally from Lesja and it was used in the previous church as well.

== See also ==
- List of churches in Møre
