= Oddernes =

Borough in Kristiansand Municipality, Norway

- Borough of Kristiansand
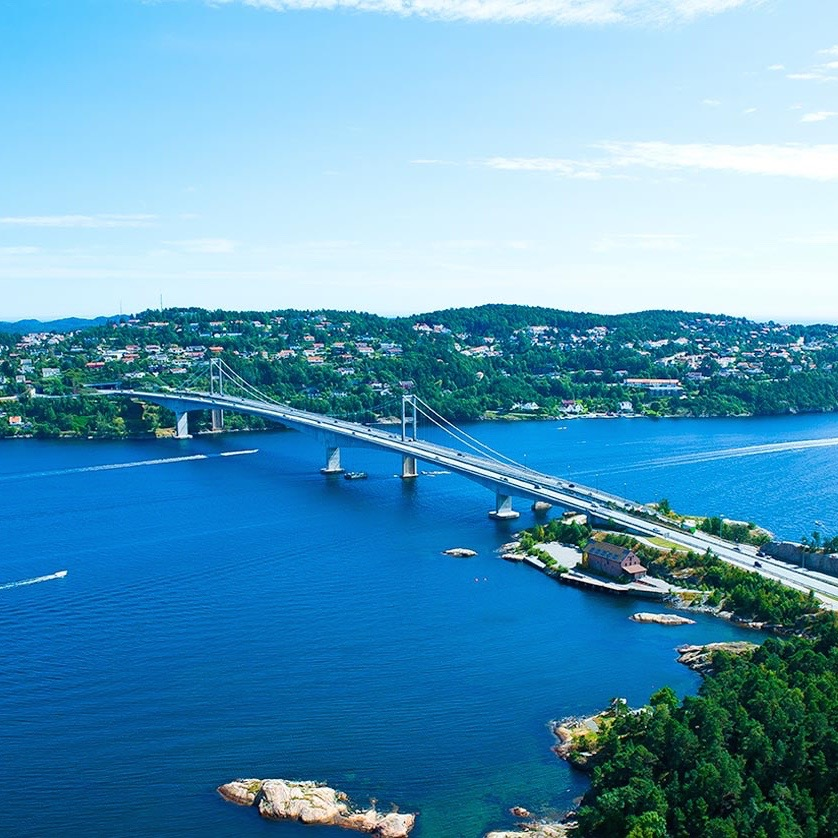
- View of the Varodd Bridge

- Coat of arms

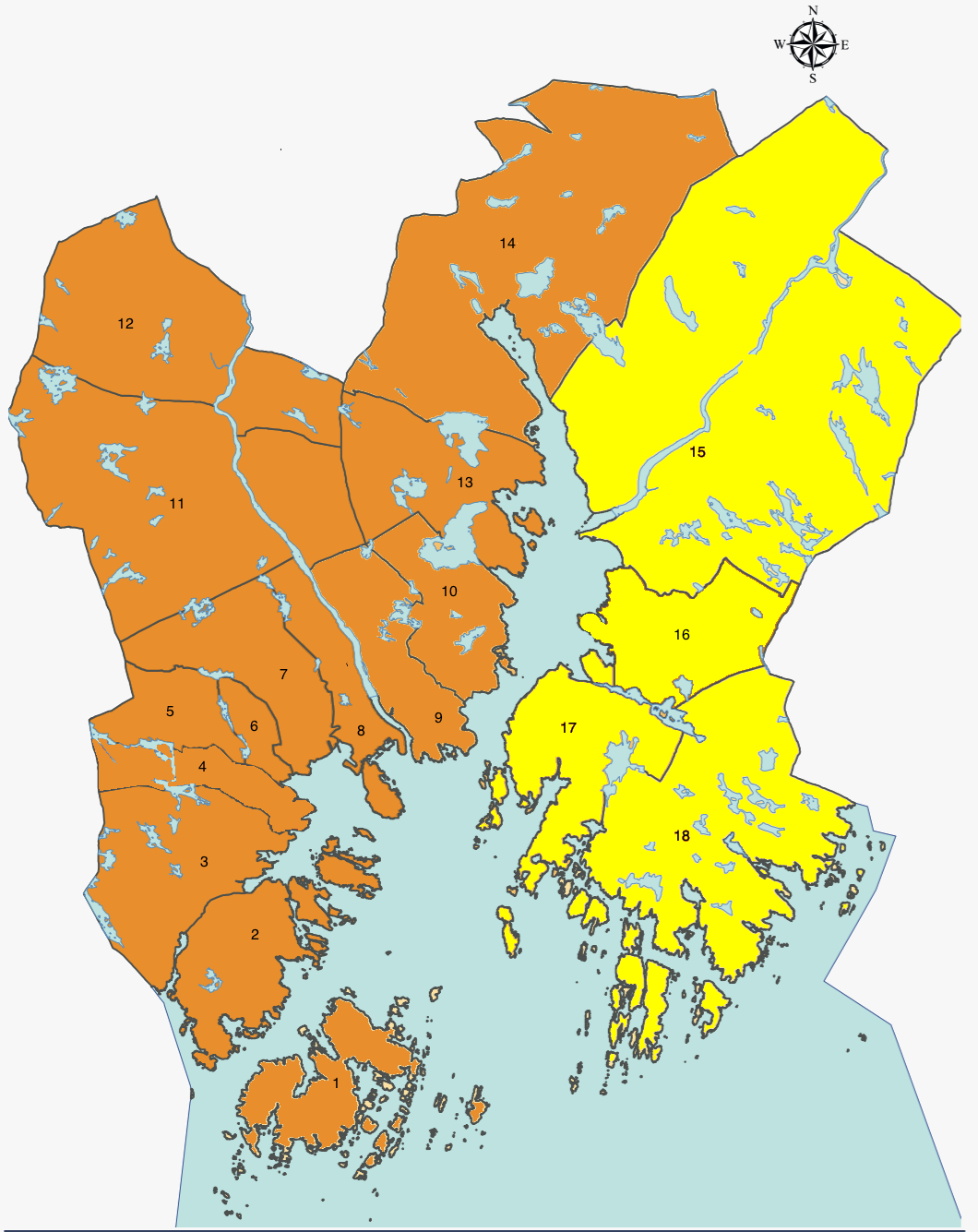
- Location of Oddernes borough, shown in yellow. Districts: 18-Tveit, 17-Søm, 16-Hånes, 15-Randesund.
- Interactive map of Oddernes
- Coordinates: 58.1749°N 08.1076°E
- Country: Norway
- Region: Southern Norway
- County: Agder
- Municipality: Kristiansand Municipality

Population (2015)
  - Total: 19,800
- Time zone: UTC+01:00 (CET)
  - Summer (DST): UTC+02:00 (CEST)
- Post Code prefix: 460*, 462*, 463*, 465*, 477*, 469*
- Website: kristiansand.kommune.no

Oddernes is a borough in the city of Kristiansand which lies in Kristiansand Municipality in Agder county, Norway. The borough covers eastern Kristiansand on the east side of the Topdalsfjorden and the Varodd Bridge. The borough includes the former municipalities of Randesund and Tveit. There was a municipality of Oddernes from 1838 until 1965, but its boundaries were very different from those of the present-day borough.

== Name ==
The borough (originally the parish) is named after the old Oddernæs farm (Old Norse: Otruness). The first part of the name comes from its location along the Otra river, and nes means peninsula, so the peninsula along the Otra river.

== Geography ==
=== Districts and neighborhoods ===
Oddernes borough is divided up into four districts. Each district is also divided up into neighborhoods.

List of districts in Oddernes
Nr	District	Population	Map
1	Søm	10,950	
2	Hånes	4,200	
3	Randesund	2,900	
4	Tveit	1,880	

List of neighborhoods in Oddernes:
Bliksheia; Bjørndalen; Boen; Brattbakken; Brattvollsheia; Butangen; Drangsholt; Dvergsnes; Dønnestad; Einerhaven; Eplehagen; Fidje	Fidjeåsen; Foss; Frikstad; Fuglevika; Fuglevikkleiva; Grovikheia; Gudbrandslia; Hamre; Hamreheia; Hamresanden; Haumyrheia; Holte	Hånestangen; Hånni; Kantarellåsen; Knarrevik; Kjelleviktoppen; Kjevik; Korsvik; Kråkebumoen; Lauvåsen; Liane; Moneheia; Nedre Hånes	Nordlia; Odderhei; Rona; Ronatoppen; Ronsbukta; Ryen; Rønnemoen; Saltbustad; Småslettene; Solsletta; Strømme; Strømsdalen	Sømskleiva; Sømslia; Timenes; Timenessletta; Topdalen; Torsvikkleiva; Tømmerstø; Vardåsen; Ve; Vrånes; Vigvoll; Vigvollåsen

=== Centrums ===
Strømme Centrum is the largest urban centre in Oddernes, it is located in Søm and is the centrum for Søm and Randesund. There is Regional Psychiatric Centre there along with other health stations. Randesund Police Station, which is a police station for Oddernes. Søm Church is located there along with Randesund Free Church. Randesund IL has their football stadium there, next to an indoor swimming pool. Strømme School is an elementary school located there. Østbyen Dagsenter is a retirement home. There is also two kindergartens in the centrum.

Hamresanden is a centrum for the district of Tveit. It has a fast-food restaurant, a grocery store, a gas station and local stores along with Tveit Free Church.

=== Photos ===
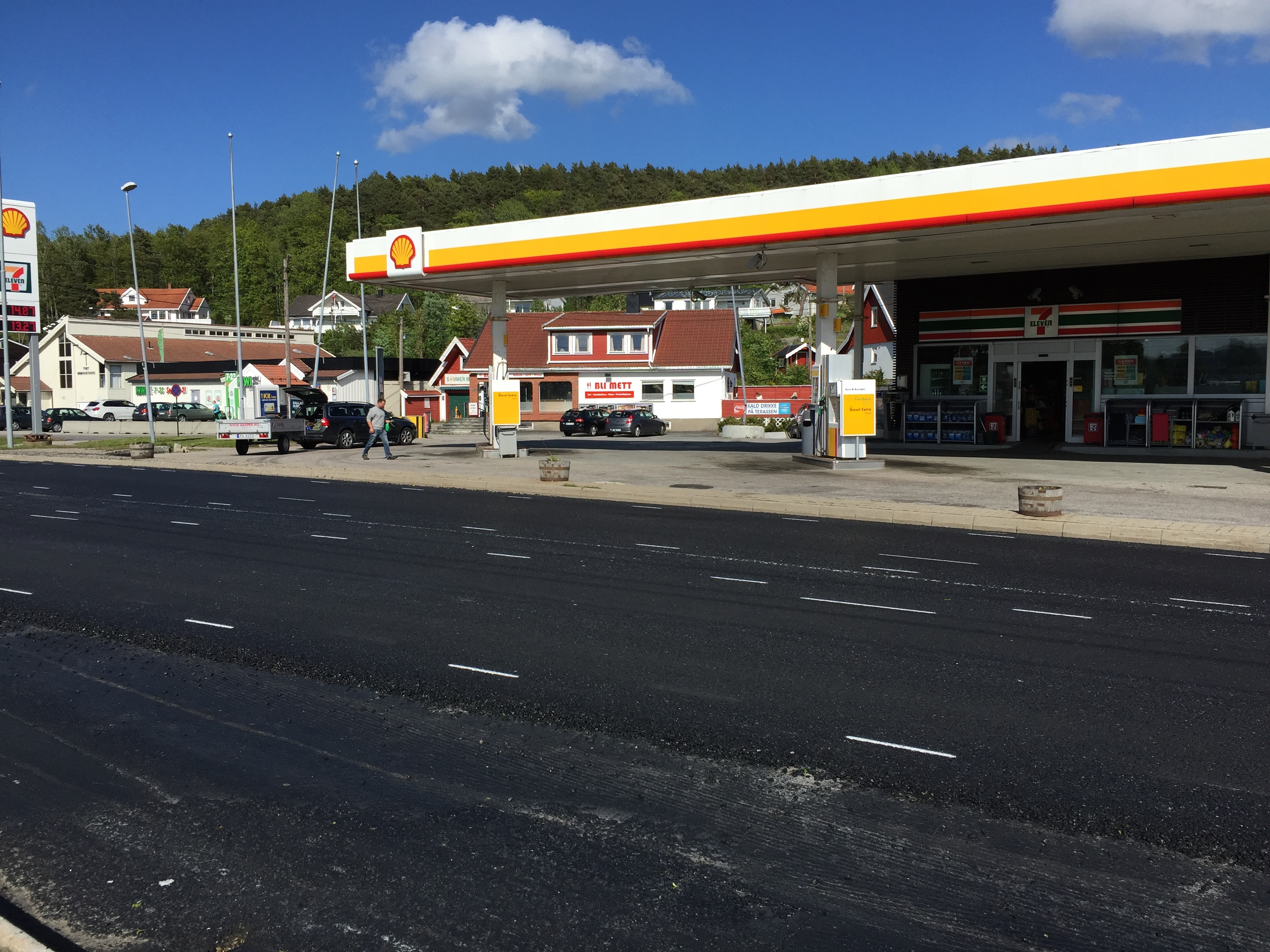
Hamresanden Centrum

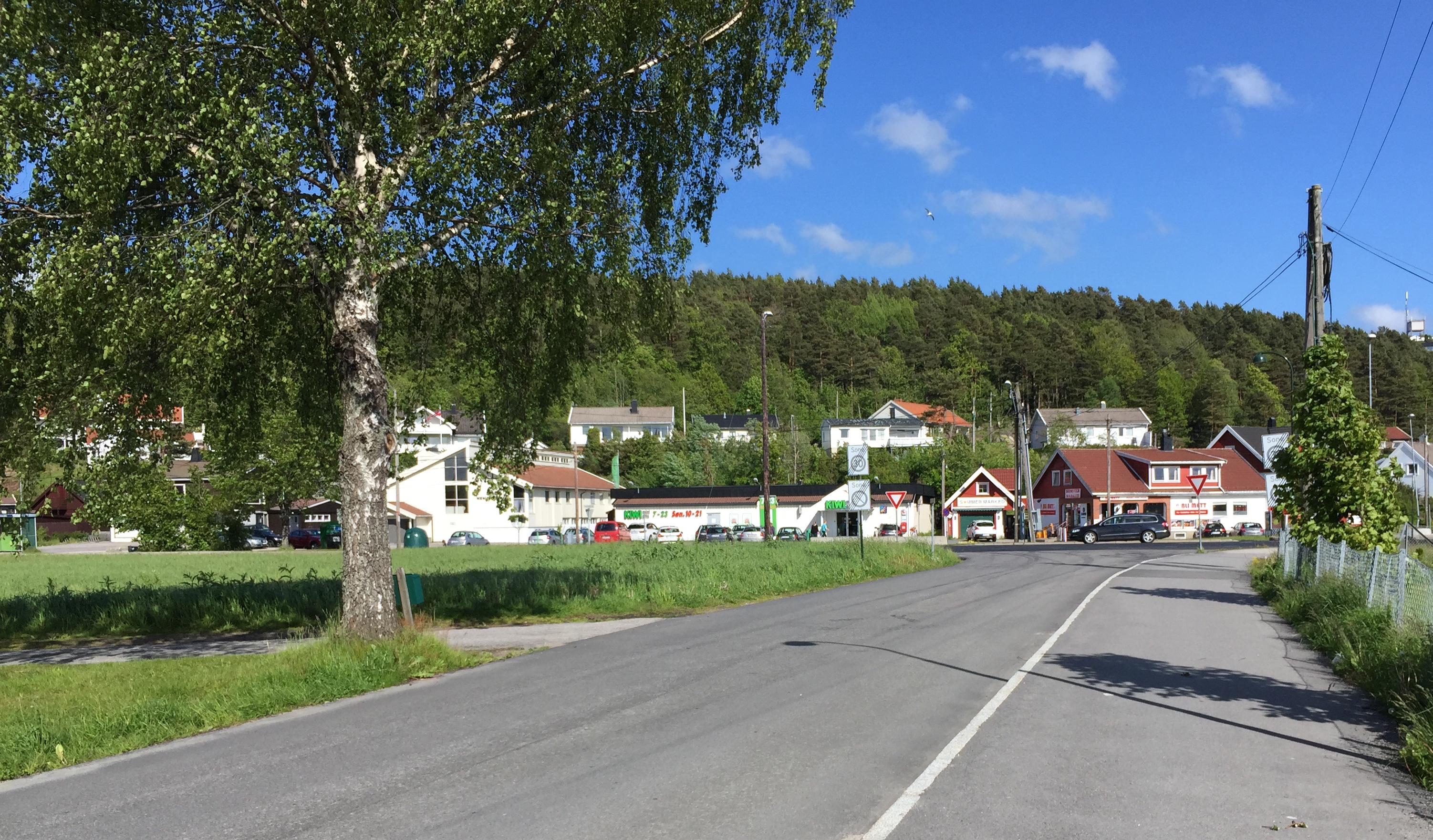
Hamre

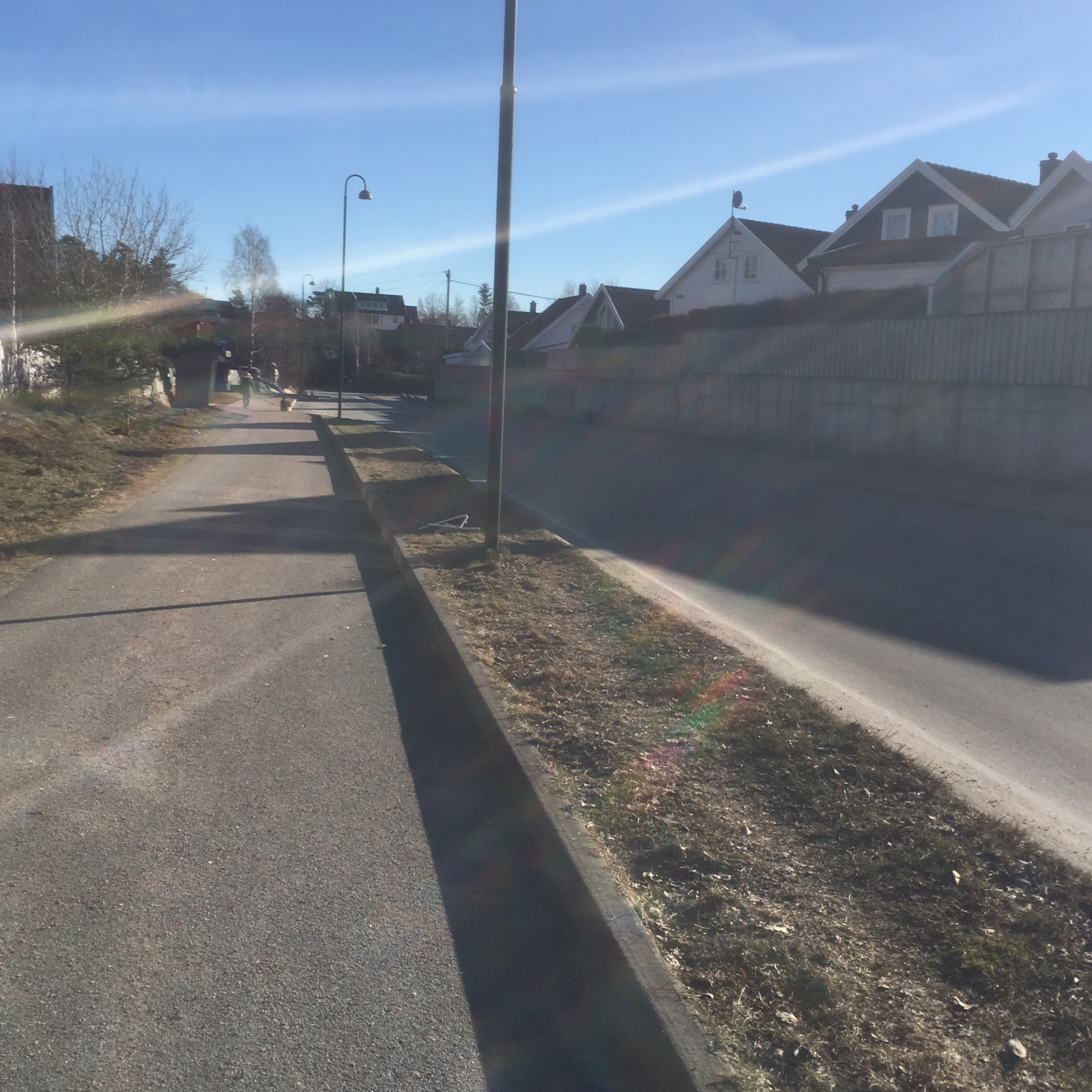
Holte

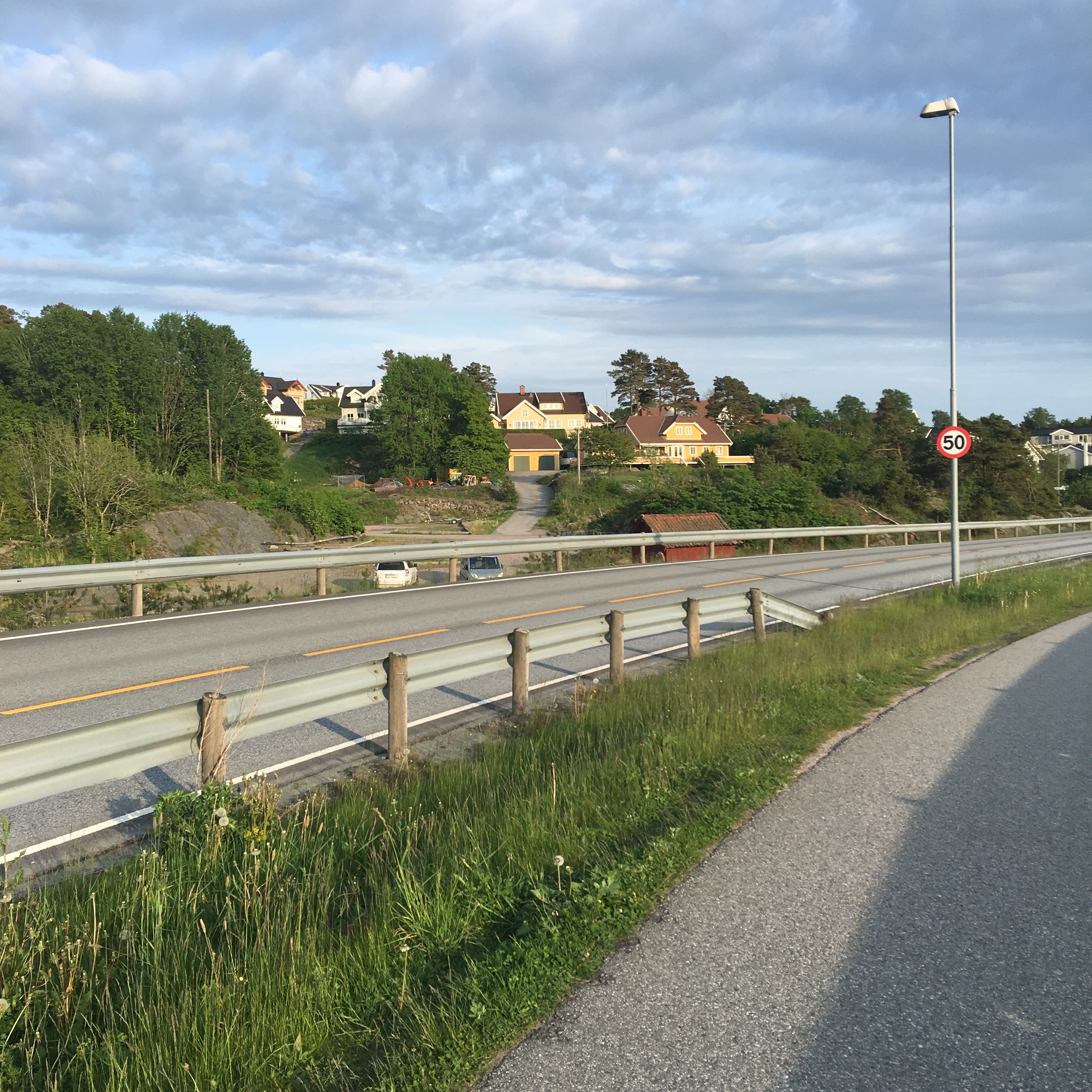
Holte

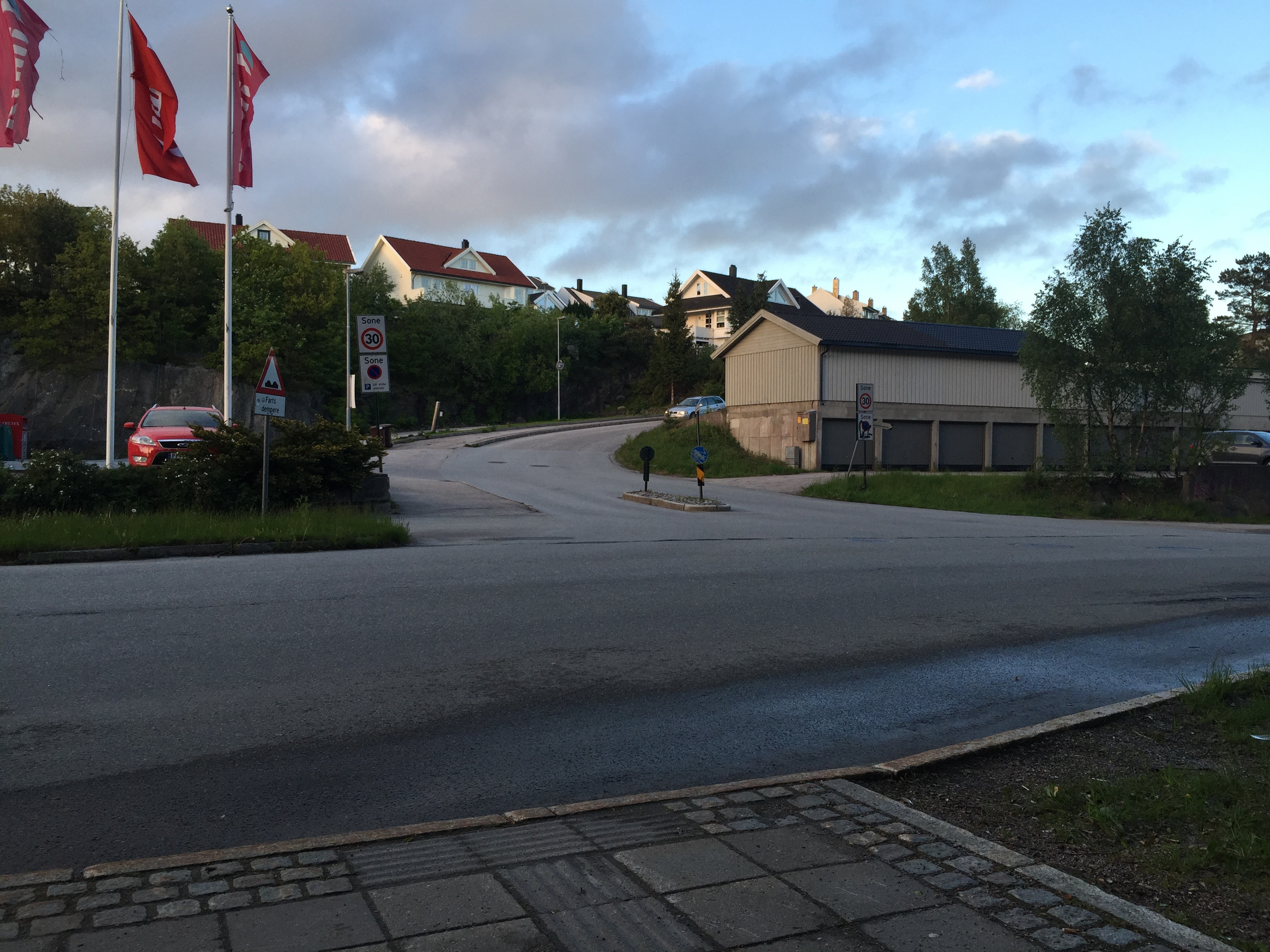
Hånni

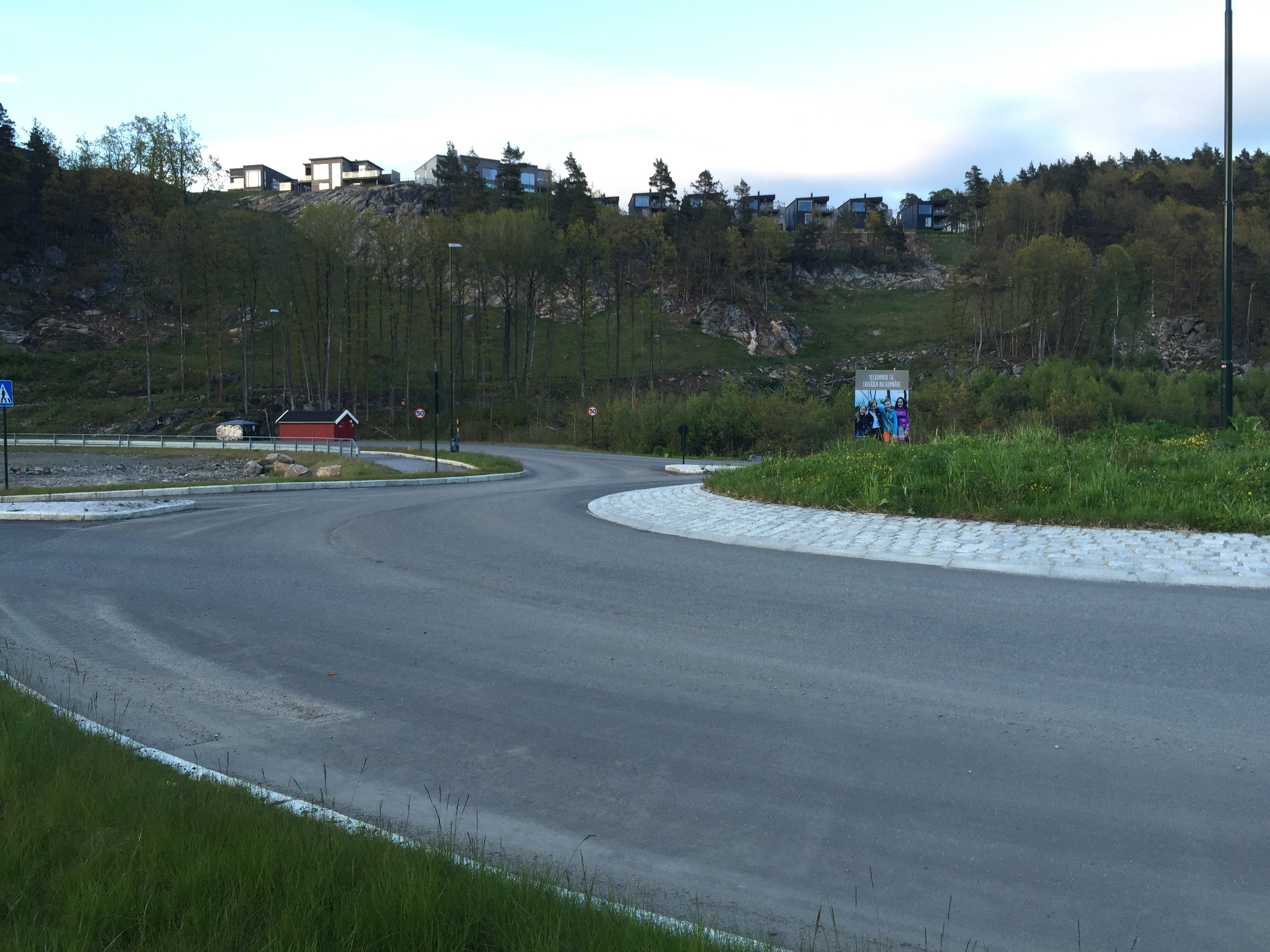
Lauvåsen

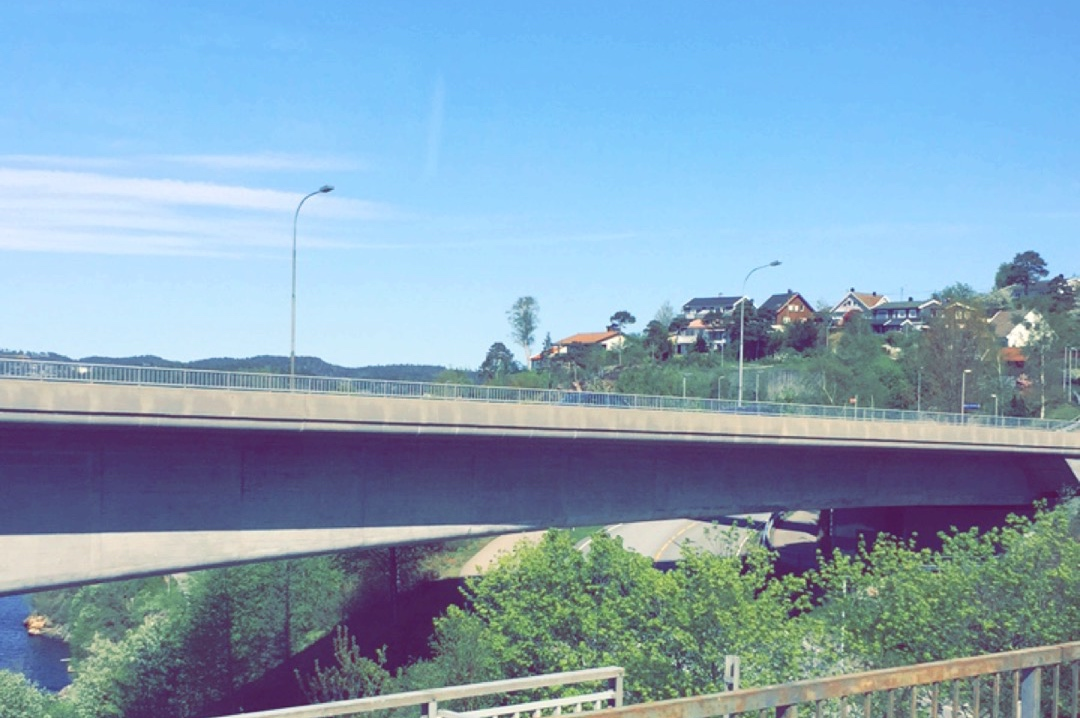
Nordlia

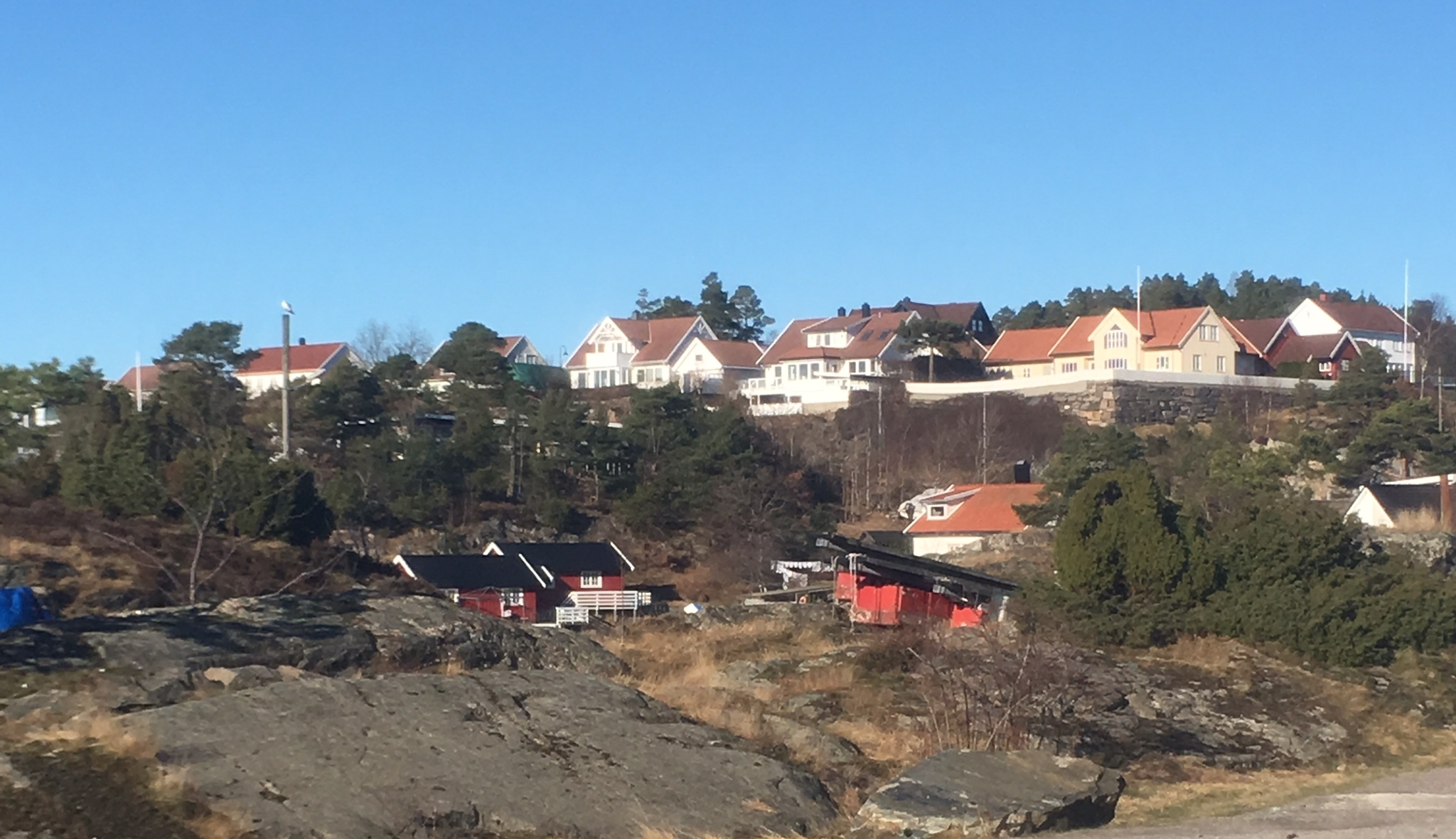
Rabbesvik

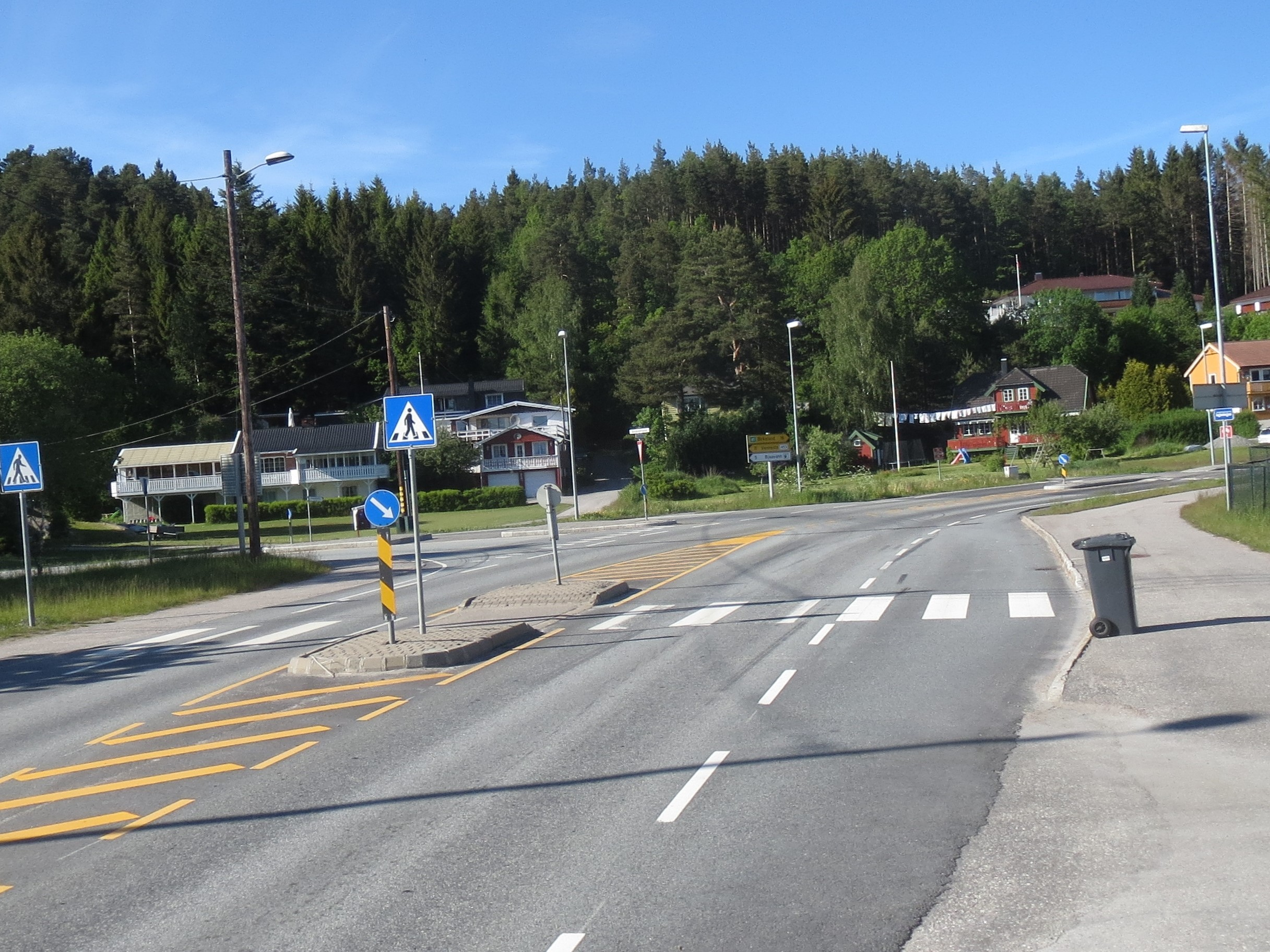
Ryen

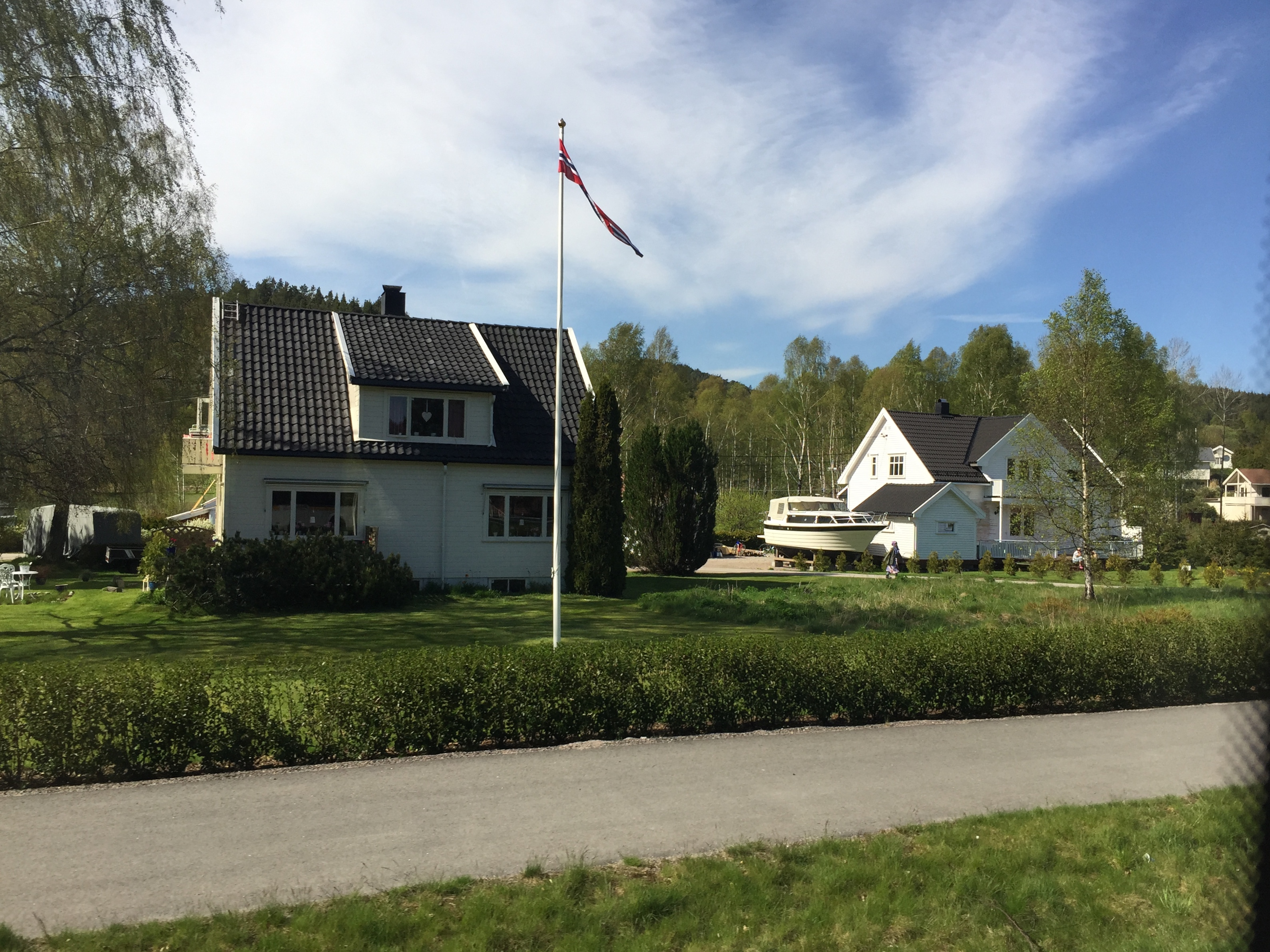
Solsletta

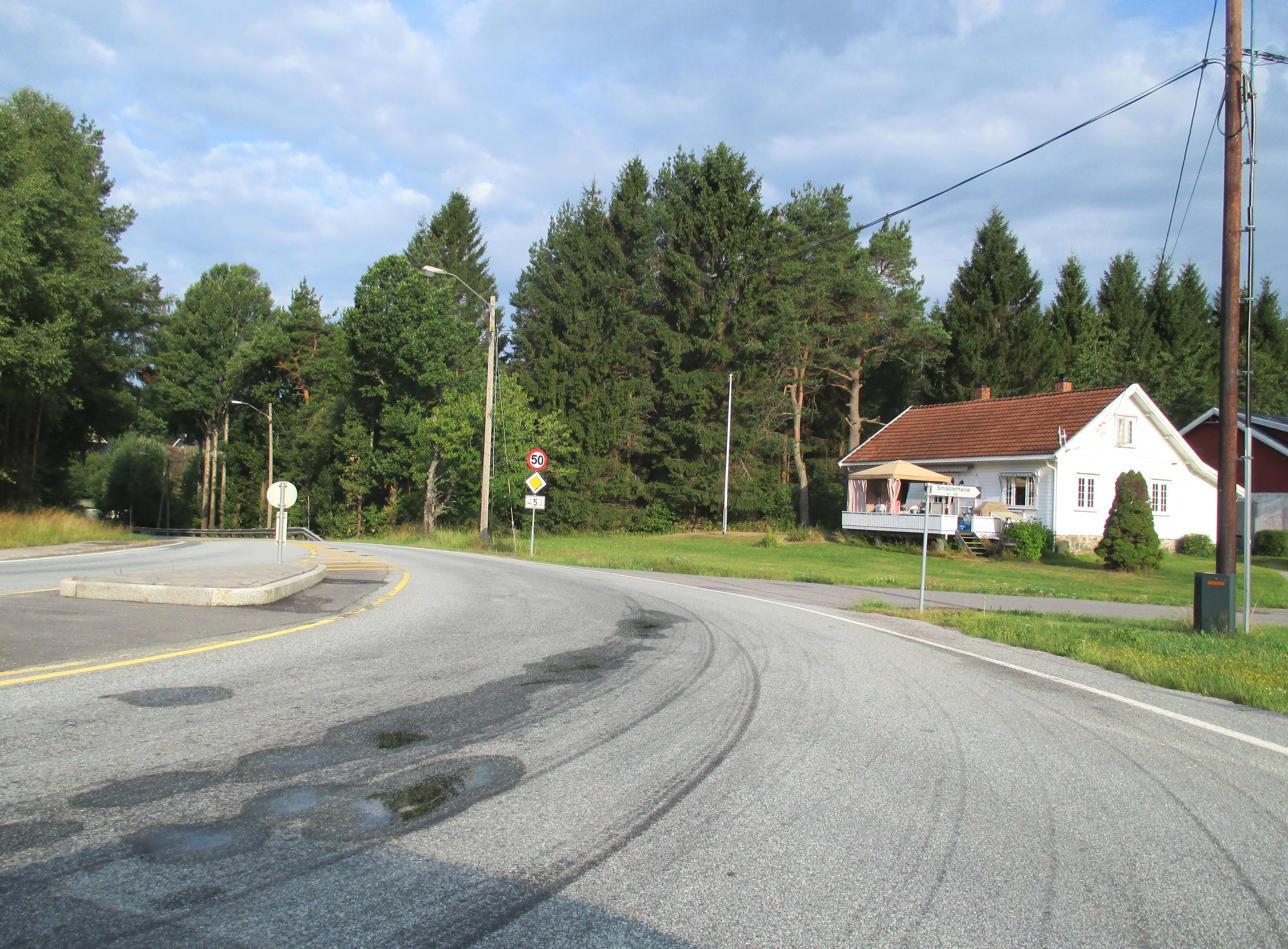
Småslettene

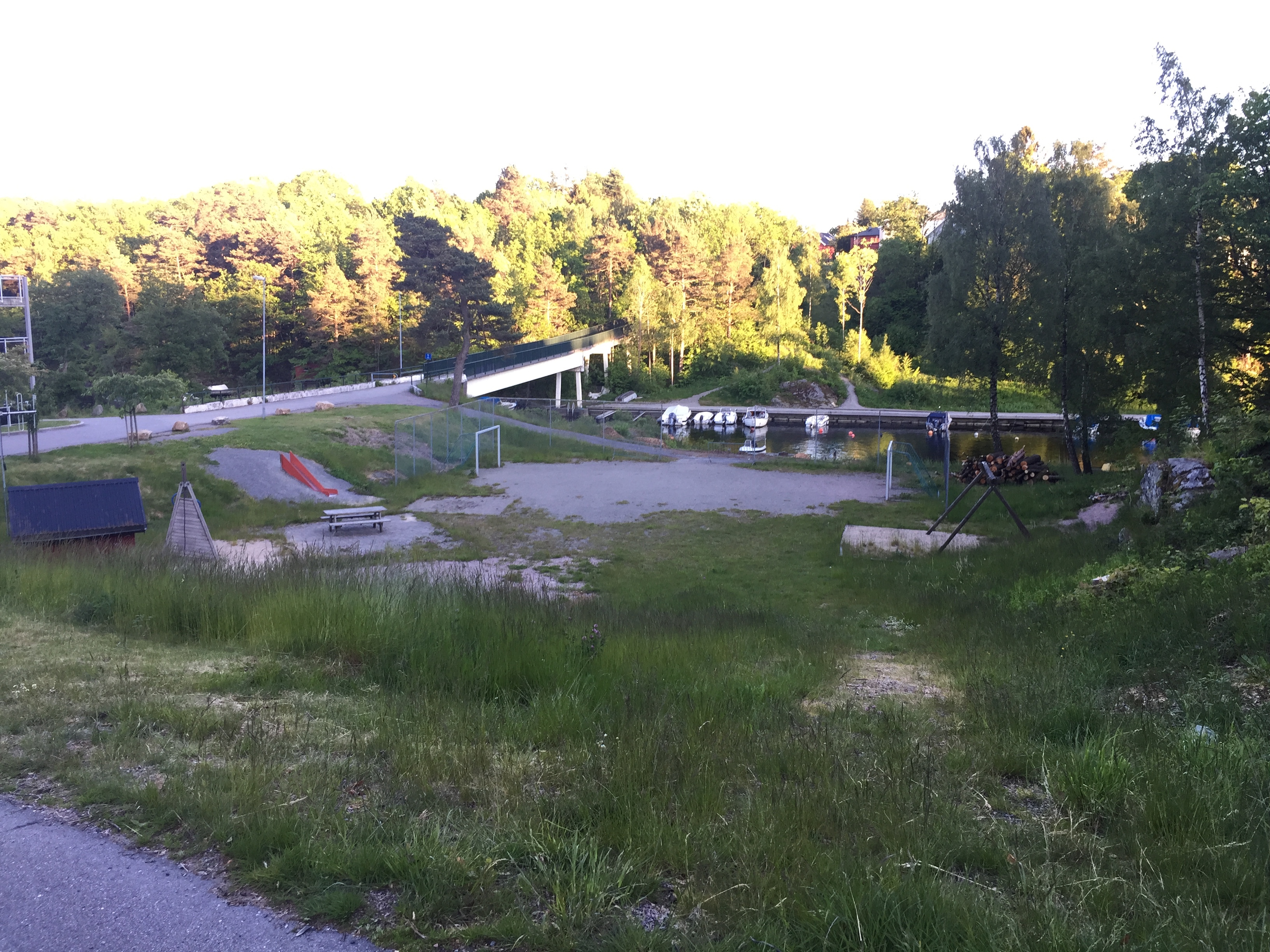
Strømsdalen

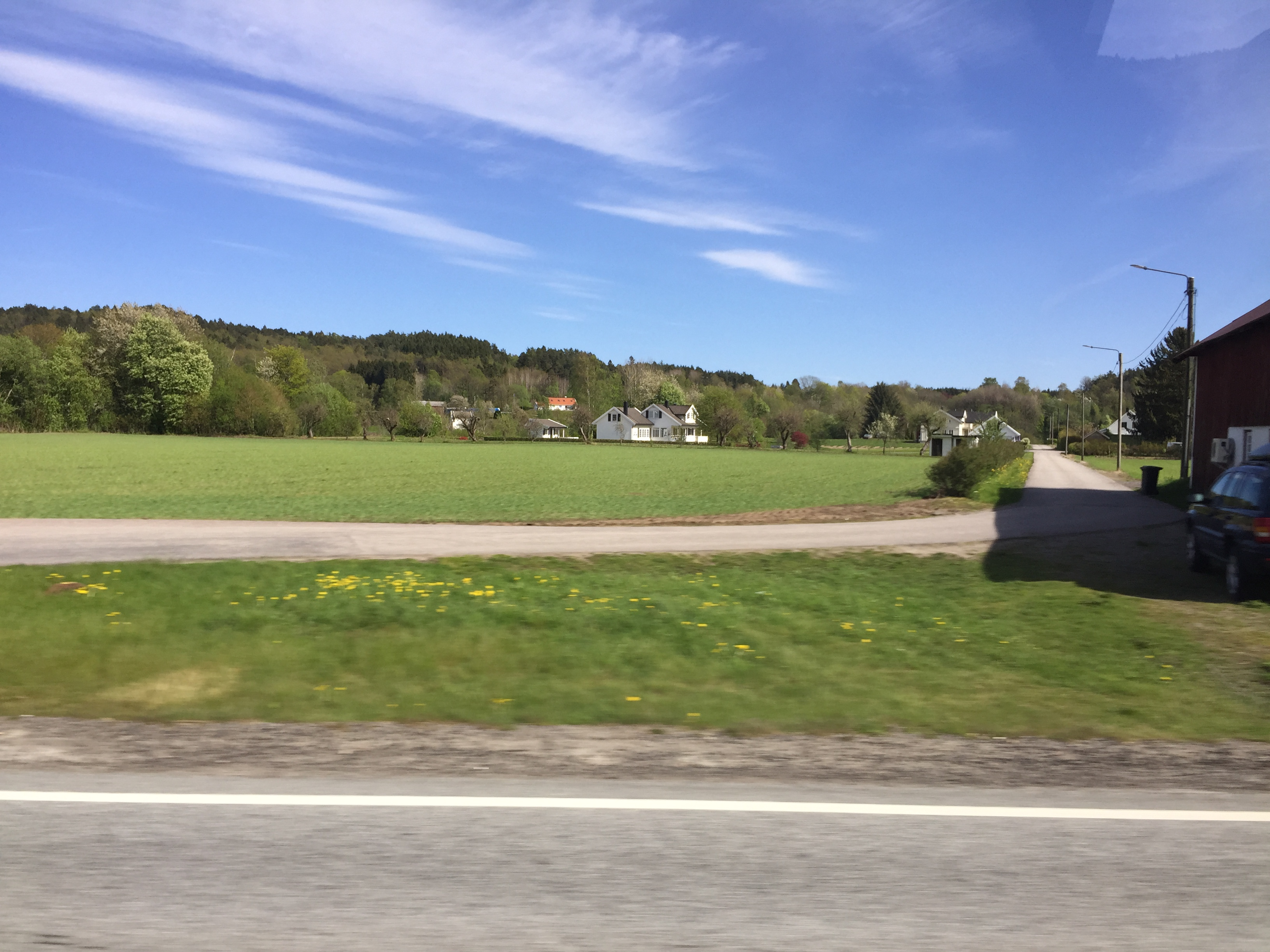
Ve

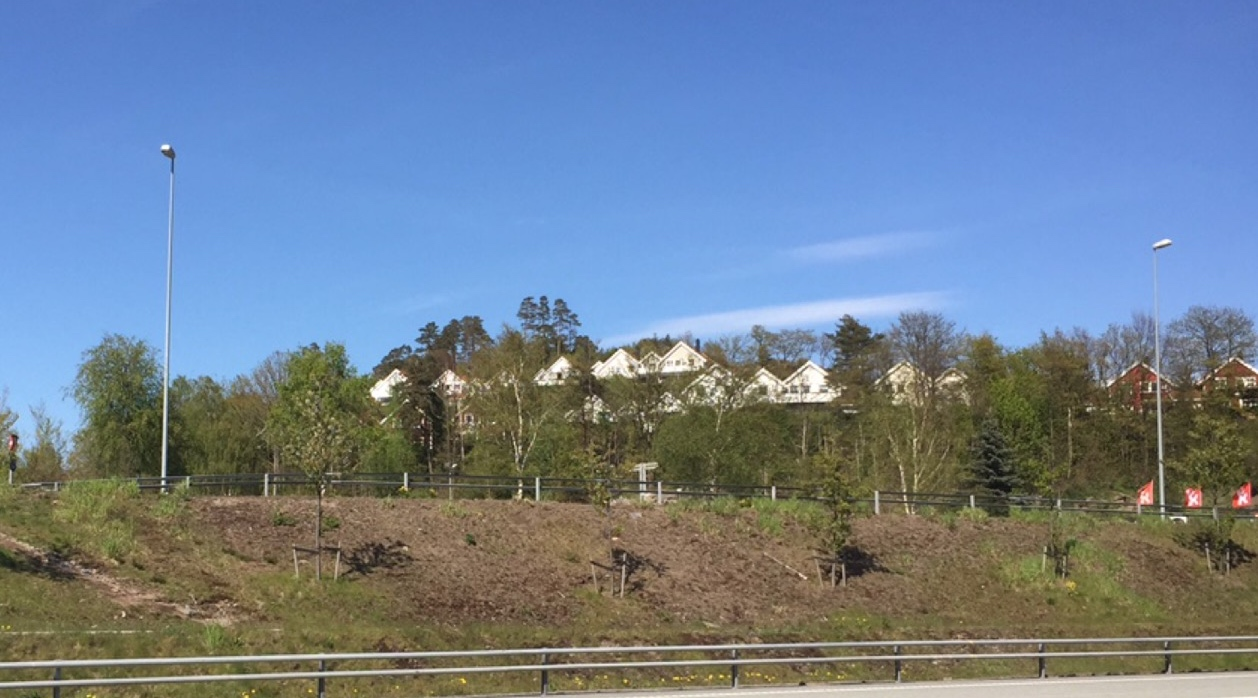
Vigvollåsen

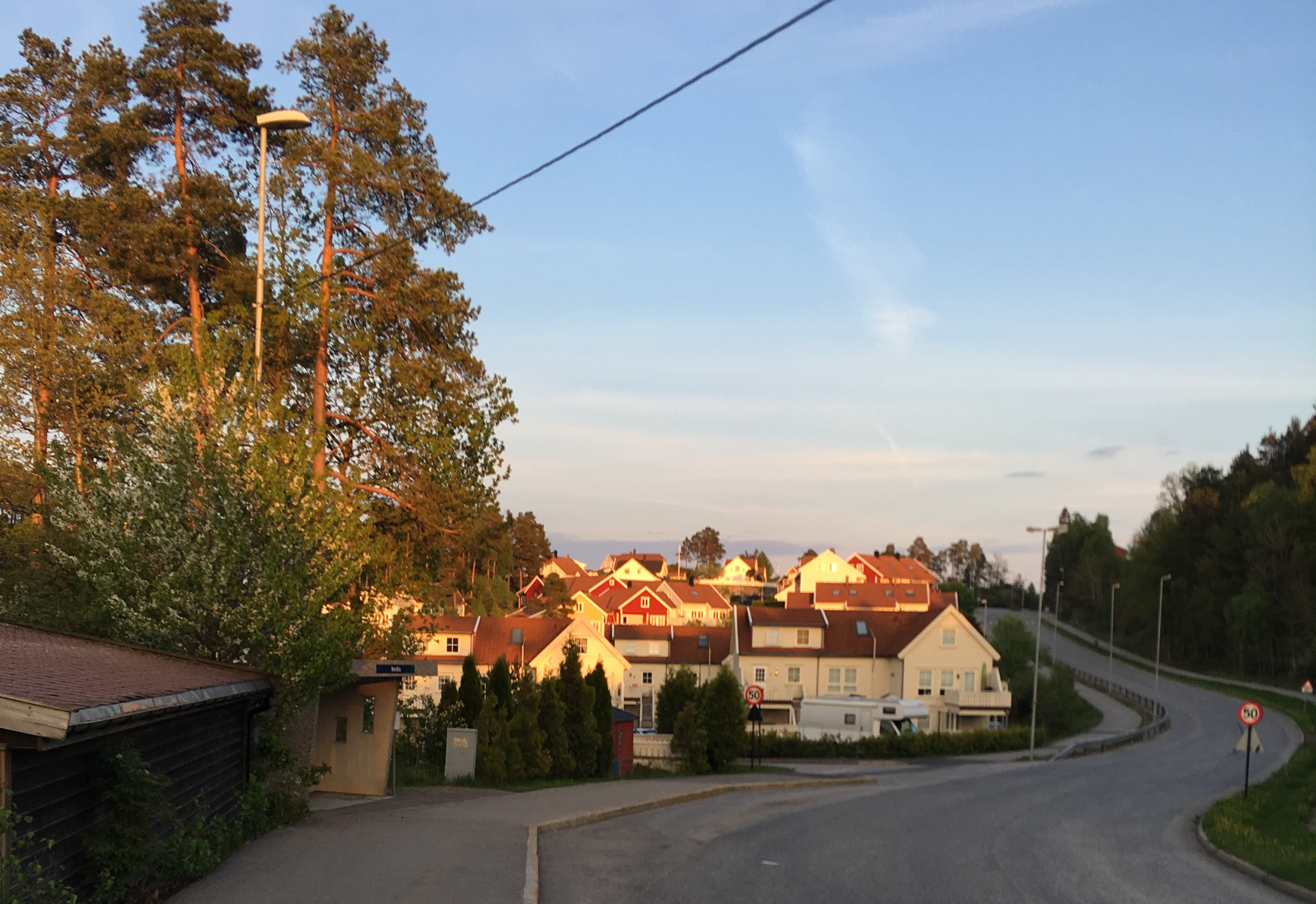
Nordlia

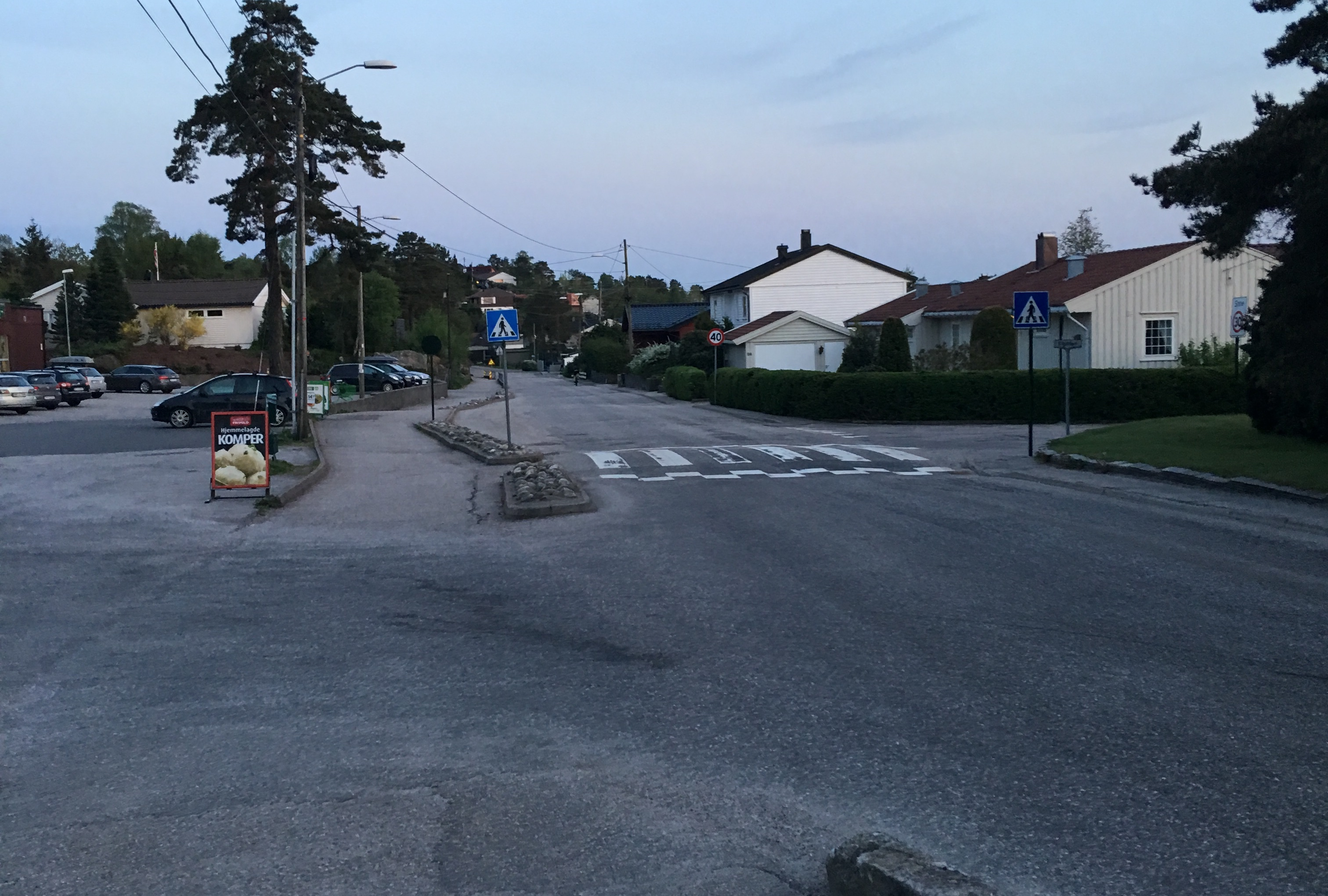
Torsvik

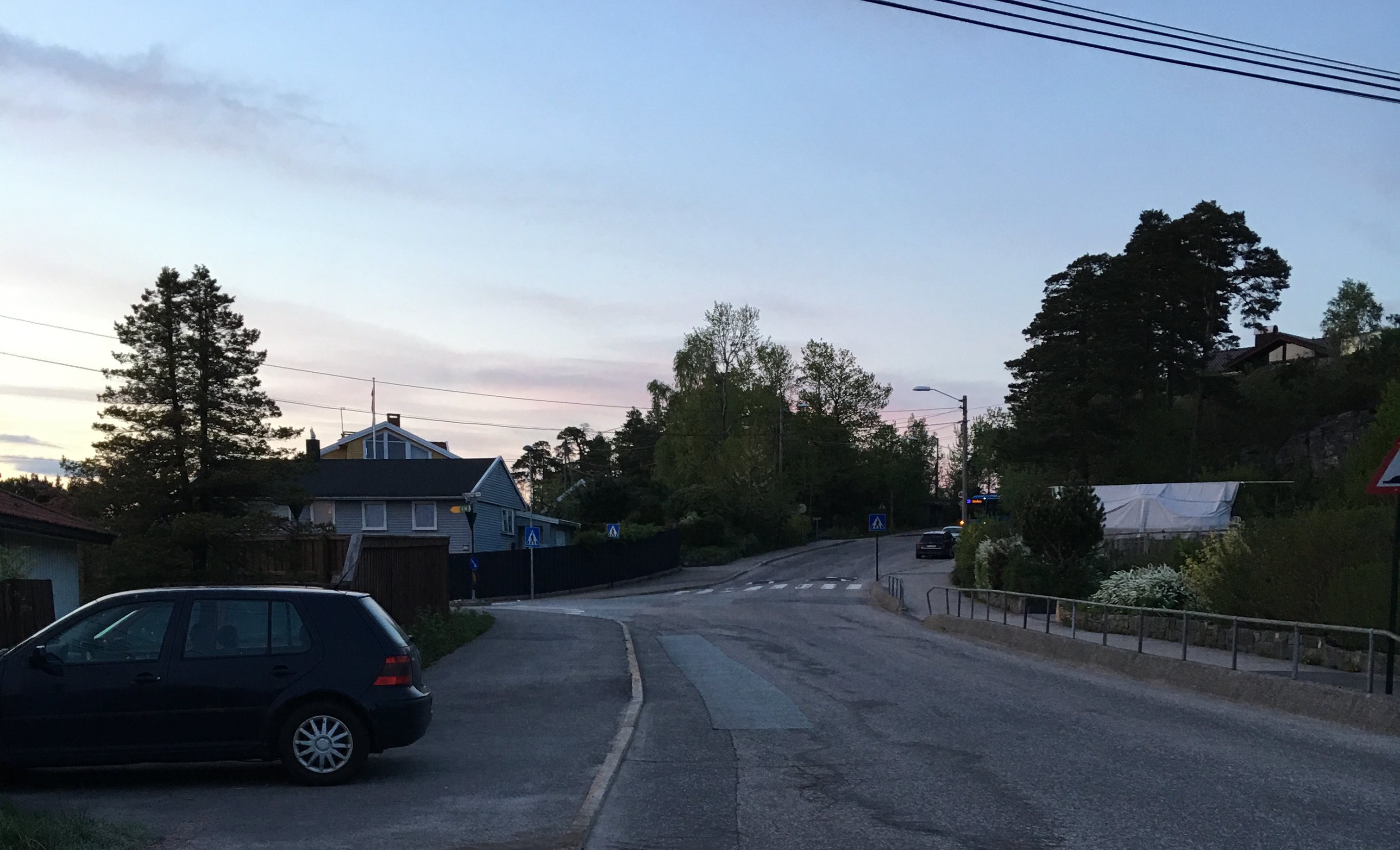
Torsvikkleiva

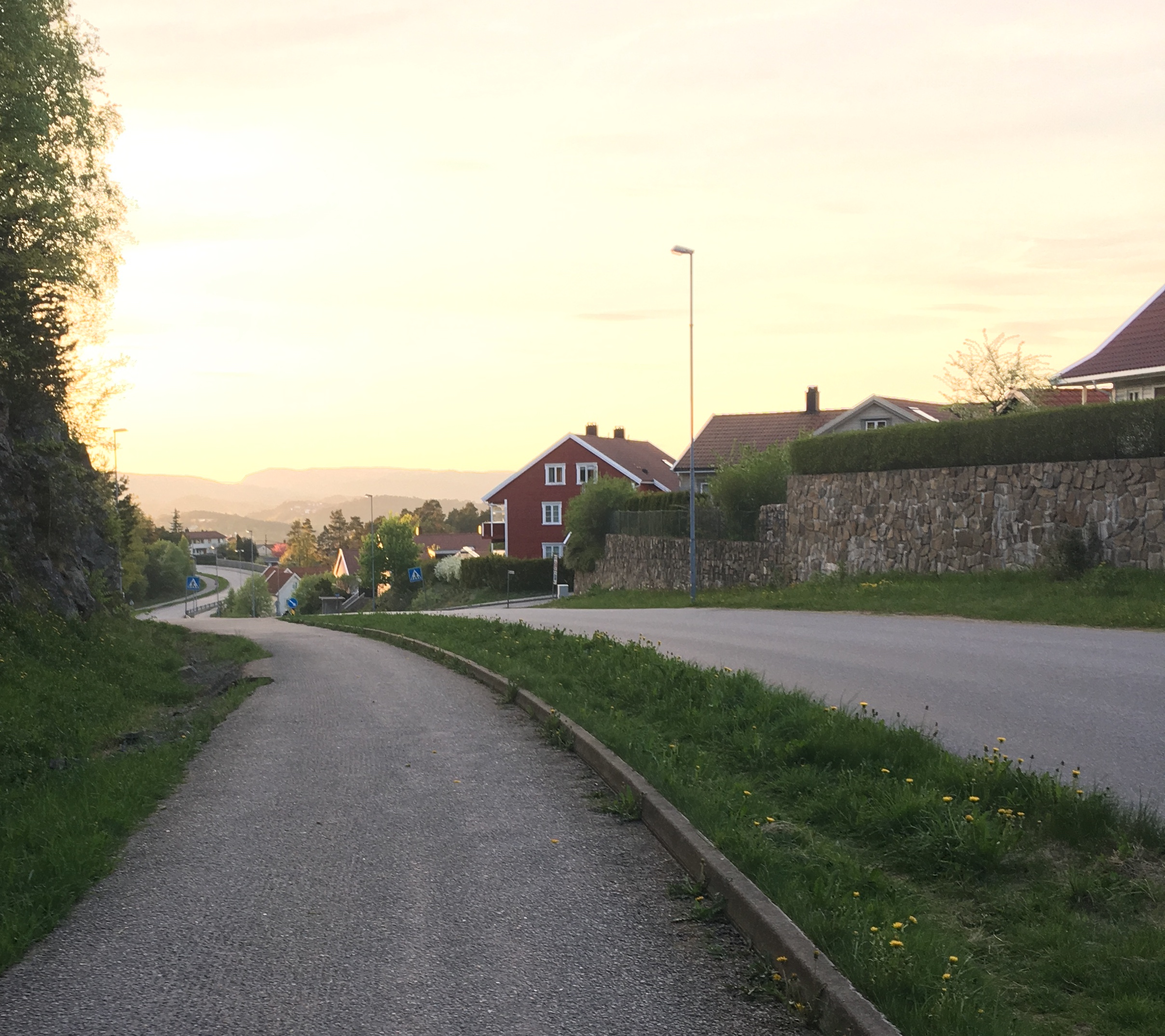
Rødhettes vei

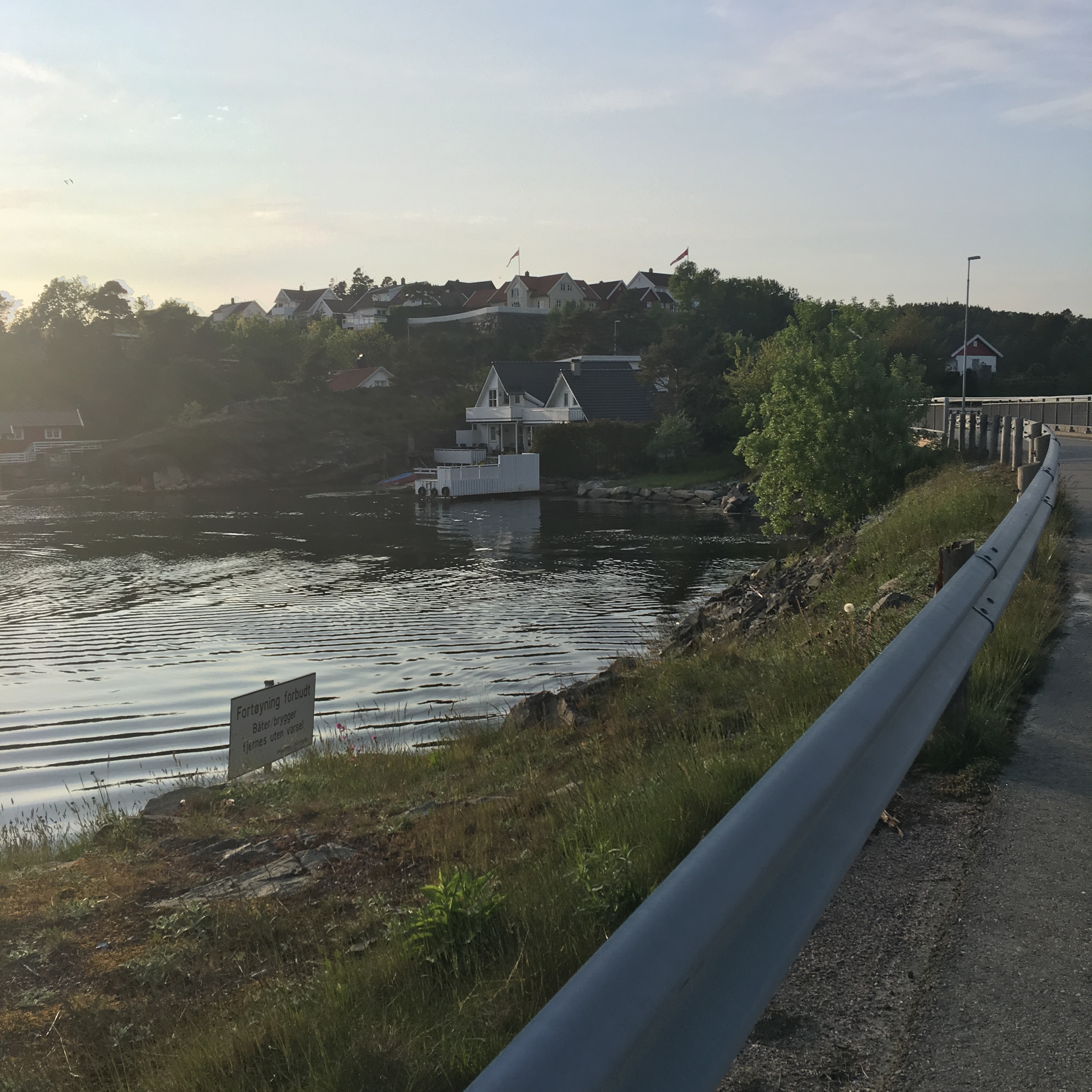
Fidjekilen

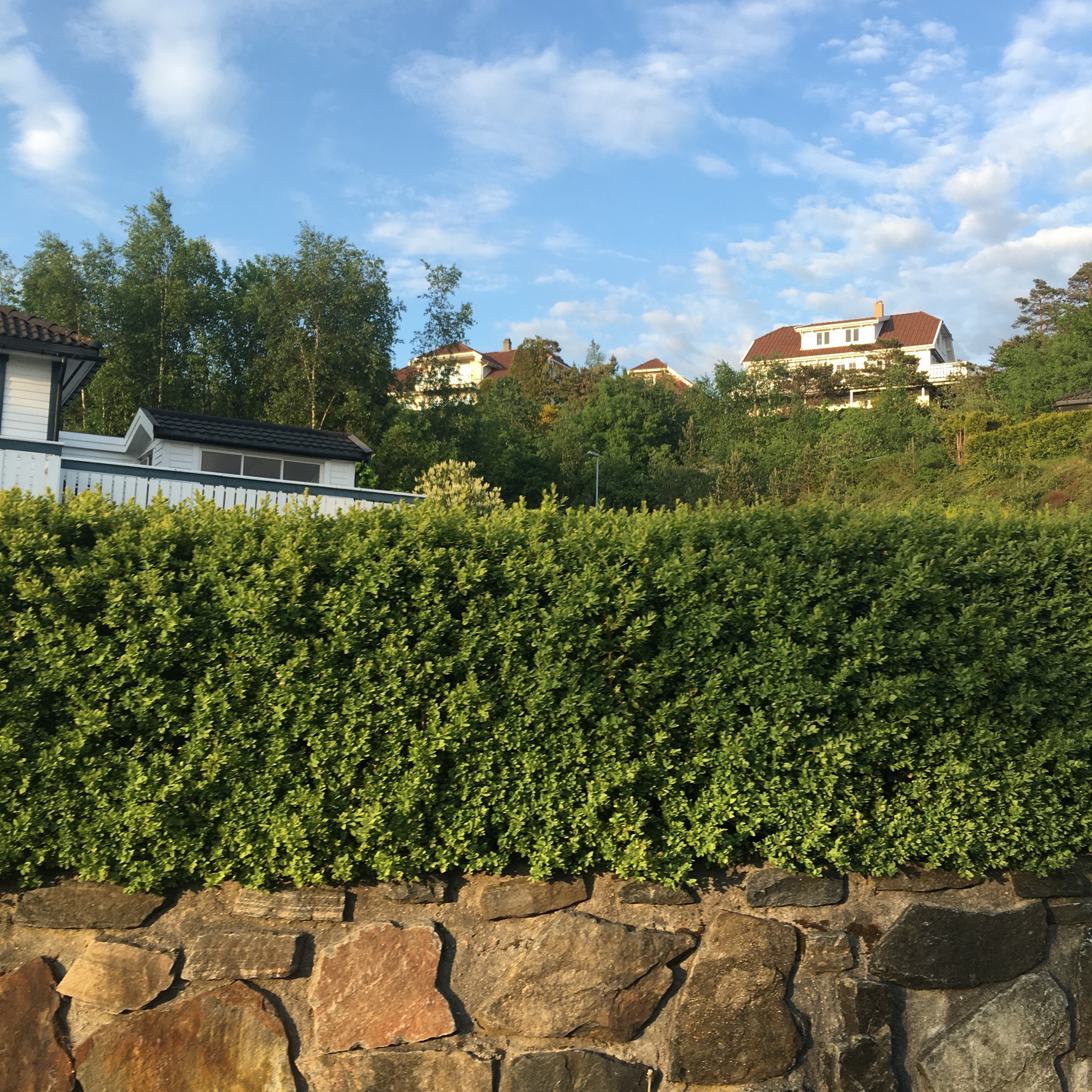
Tømmerstø with Dreggveien

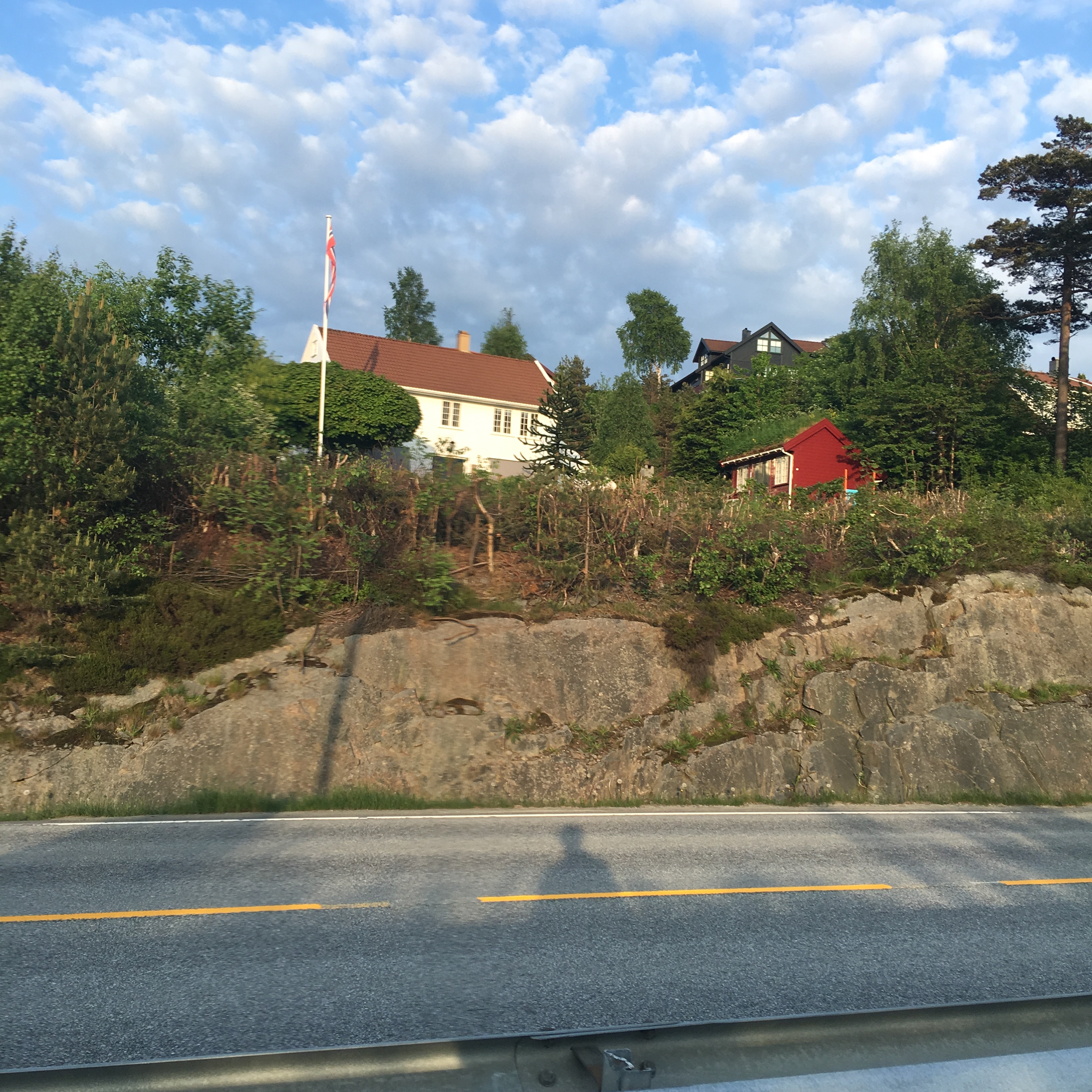
Odderhei

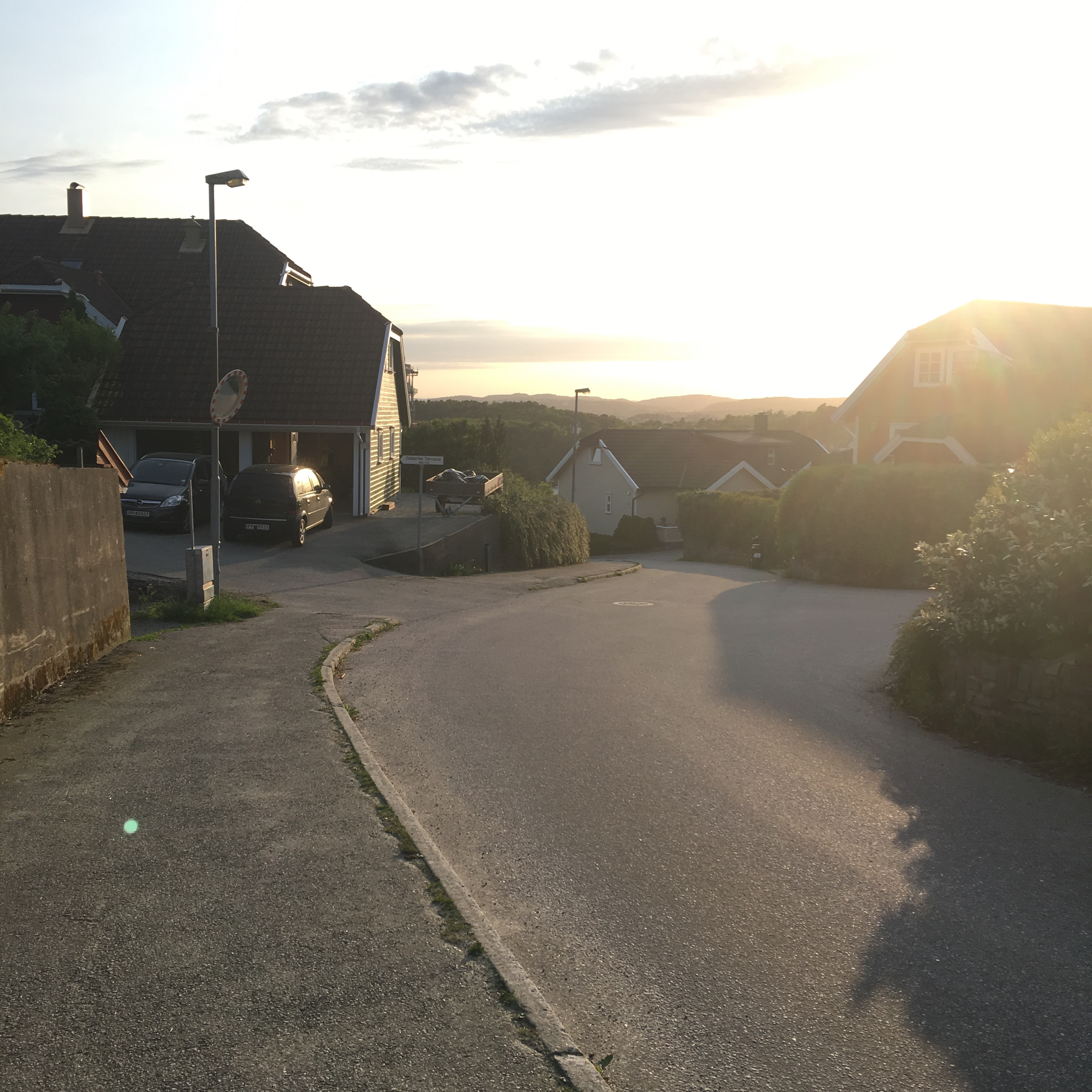
Odderhei Terrasse

== Education ==
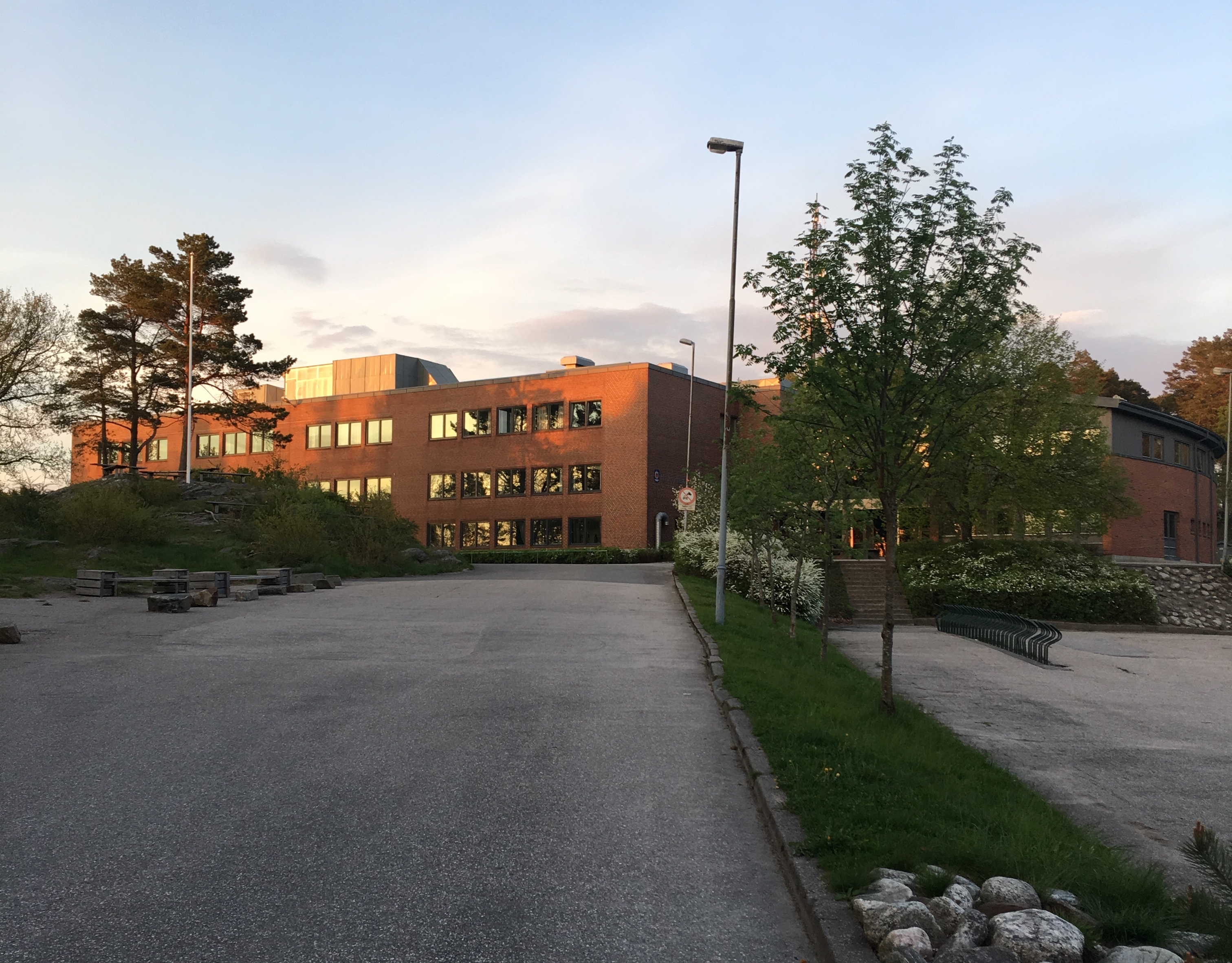
Haumyrheia Skole

List of schools in Oddernes
Name	Location	Type
Dvergsnes skole	Dvergsnes	Elementary school
Haumyrheia skole	Søm	Junior High
Heståsen skole	Hånes	Elementary
Holte skole	Tømmerstø	Elementary
Hånes skole	Hånes	Elementary
Kringsjå skole	Randesund	Elementary
Strømme skole	Strømme	Elementary
Sørlandet Maritime videregående	Tømmerstø	High School
Vardåsen skole	Søm	Elementary
Ve skole	Tveit	Elementary and Junior High
Vigvoll skole	Vigvoll	Junior High

== Transportation ==
Kristiansand Airport, Kjevik is located at Tveit and is the main airport serving Kristiansand and Southern Norway. In 2014 there were around 1 million travelers. The airport is served with domestic routes to some of Norway's largest cities and international routes to European cities and some charter flights to southern Europe.

European route E18 is the main road and a highway, it goes through Oddernes from the neighboring Lillesand Municipality. E18 goes past the zoo and Sørlandsparken, then between Hånes and Søm before exiting the borough on the bridge Varoddbrua to Lund. Norwegian National Road 41 comes from Birkenes Municipality and enters Kristiansand north in Tveit. The road also connects to the airport and ends with E18 at Timenes. County road 401 goes from E18 at Rona and through Søm and Randesund before exiting Kristiansand to Høvåg in Lillesand Municipality. In Lillesand County road 401 meets the County road 420 which starts at Sørlandsparken in Kristiansand and ends in Arendal. County road 420 used to be the old E18 before the new one opened in 2009.

List of notable roads in Oddernes
Route	Destination
E18	Oslo - Sørlandsparken - Haumyrheia - Downtown
Rv41	Birkeland - Timenes
Rv451	Kristiansand Airport, Kjevik - Kjevik
Fv3	Søm - Frikstad - Drangestrand
Fv4	Tømmerstø - Kongshaven
Fv10	Strømme - Korsvik
Fv11	Holte - Frikstad
Fv401	Rona - Randesund
Fv420	Arendal - Lillesand - Sørlandsparken
Fv453	Ålefjær - Ryen

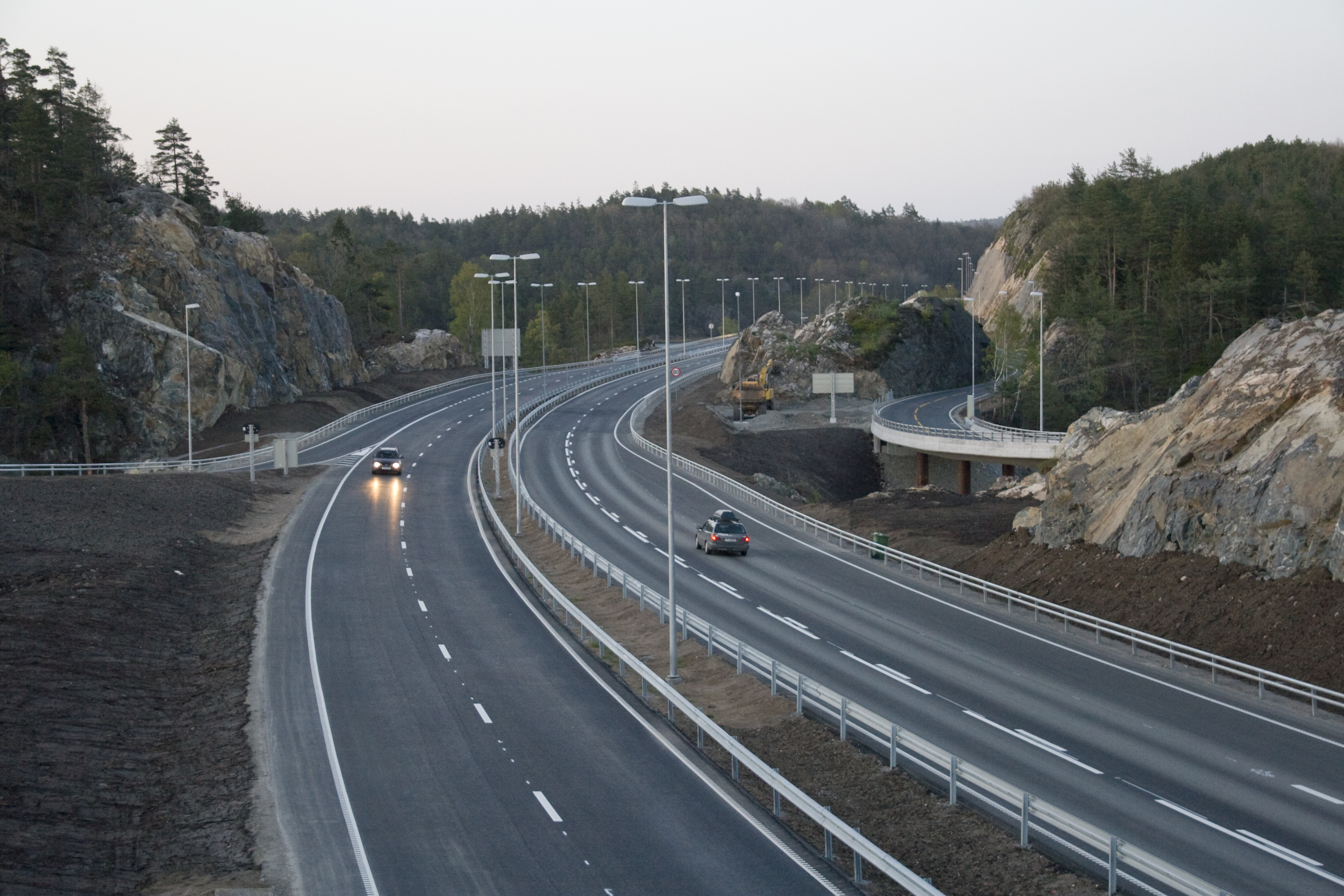
European route 18

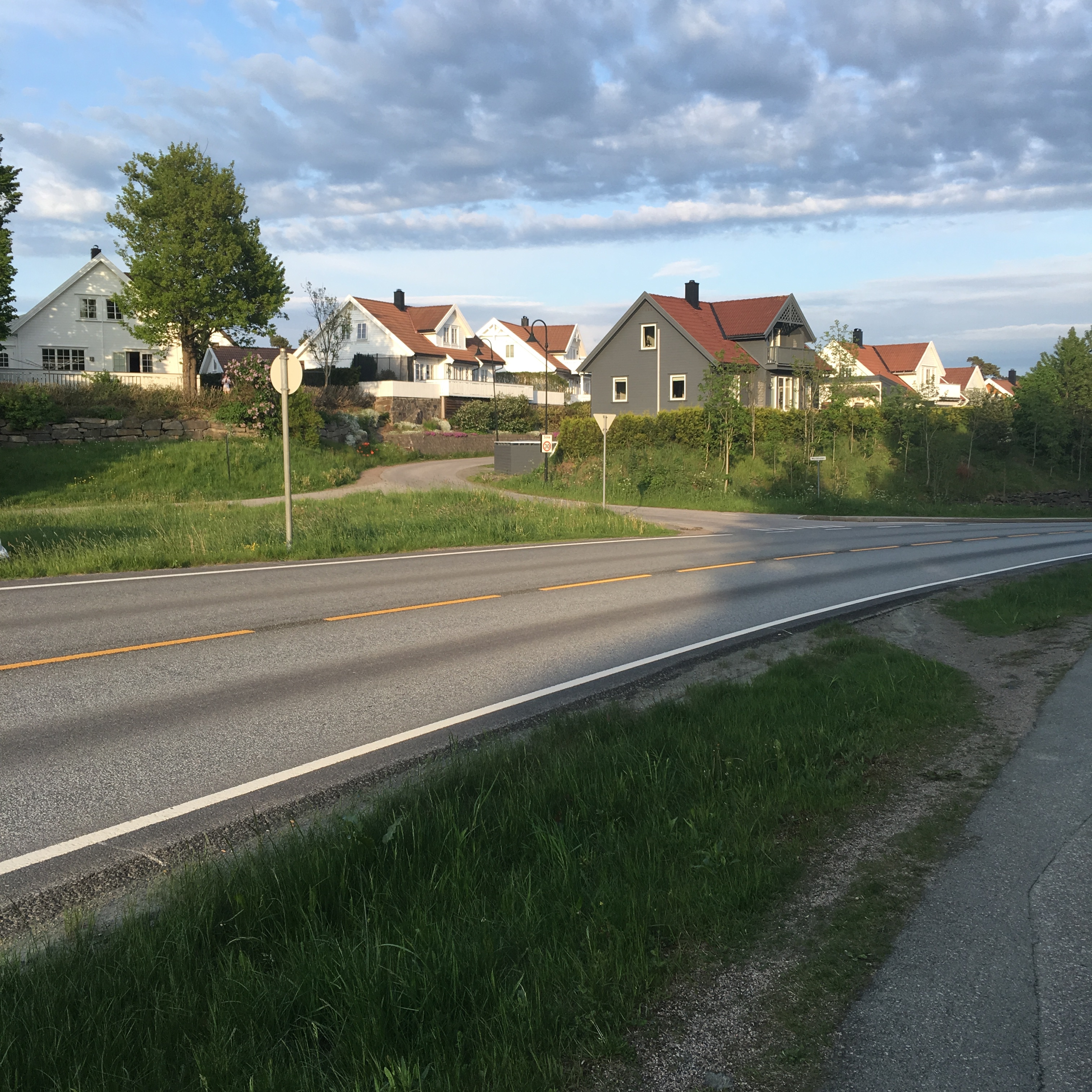
Norwegian County Road 3, Kystveien, with Tømmerstø

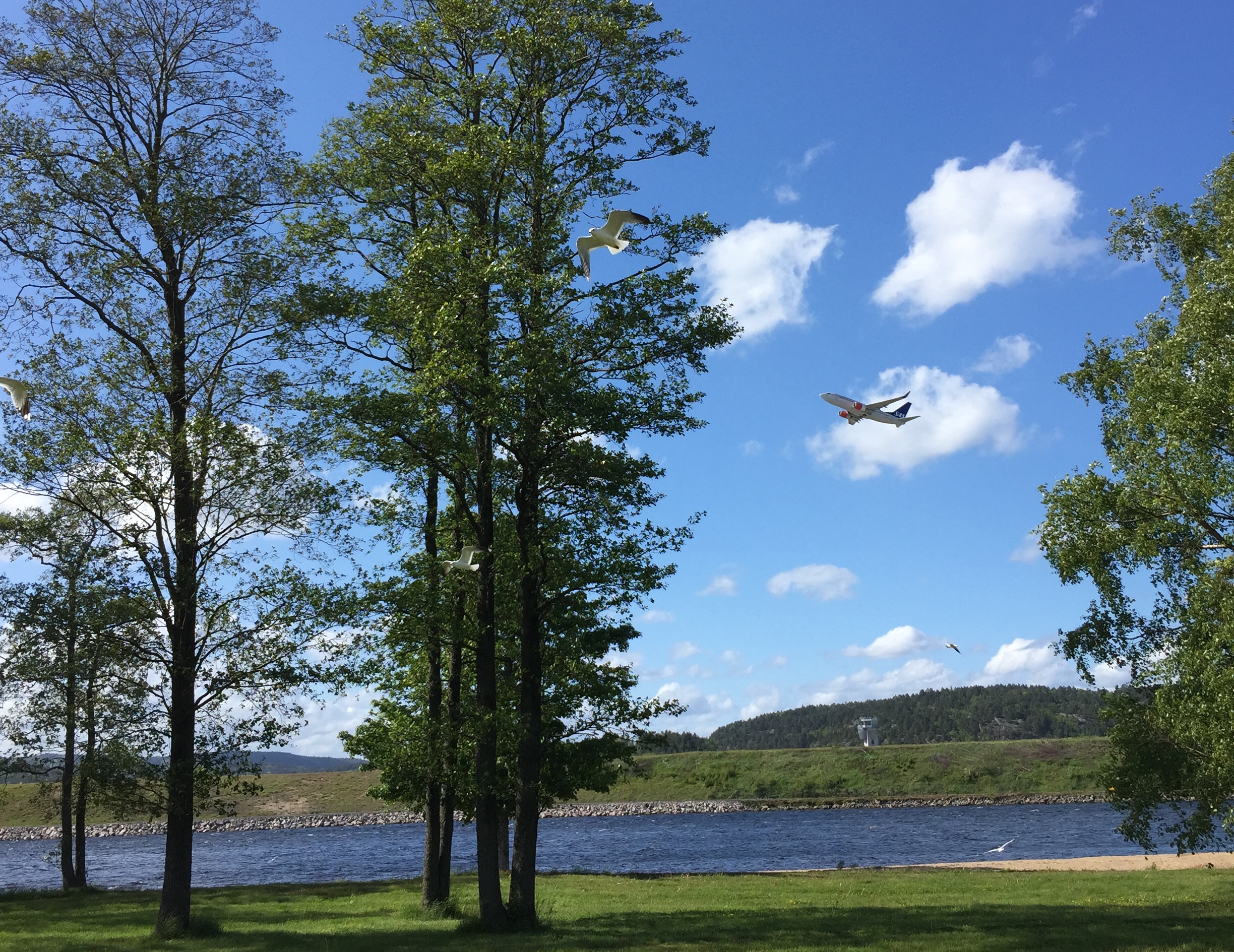
Kjevik Airport seen from Hamresanden

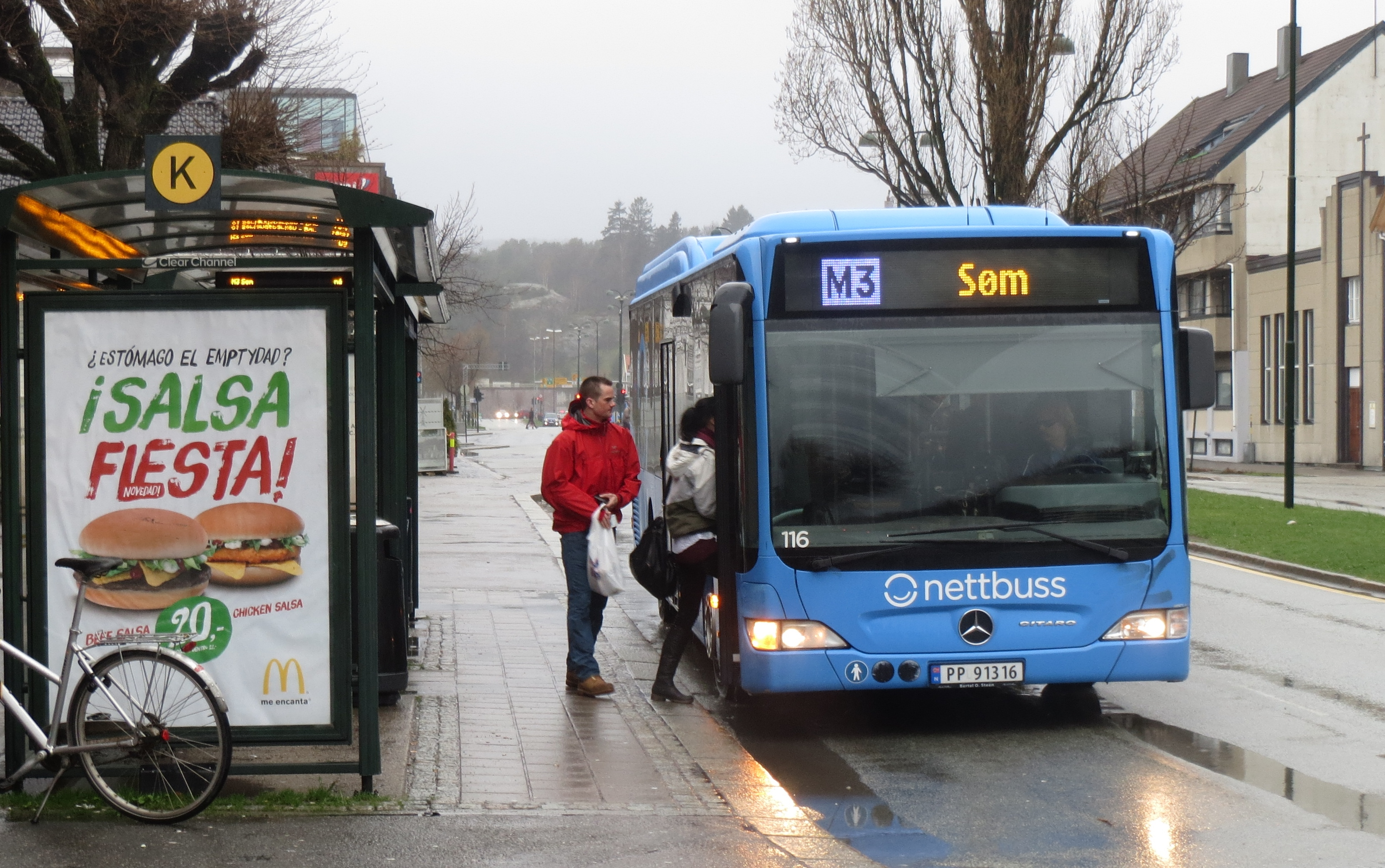
A bus downtown on its way to Søm

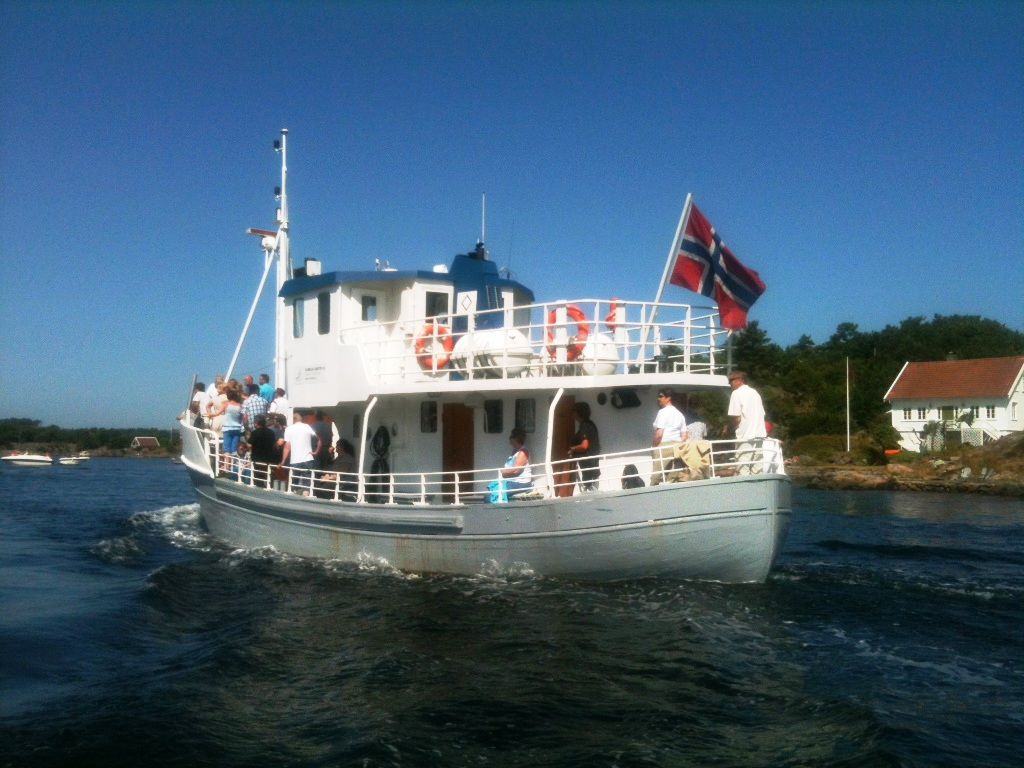
Public ferry in Randesund

Buses in Oddernes is mostly served by routes 01, M1, M2, M3, 17, 18, 35, 36, 37, 100 and 139. These routes goes all day and extra in the rush hours, while the others goes only to certain times. Regional buses to Oslo stops at one stop in Oddernes, Håneskrysset, before continuing.

Local bus transportation from/through Oddernes
Line	Destination
01	Sørlandsparken - Kvadraturen
M1	Sørlandsparken-Dyreparken IKEA - Flekkerøy
A1	Sørlandsparken - Kvadraturen
A2	Hånes - Kvadraturen
A3	Søm - Kvadraturen
A24	Skibåsen - Kvadraturen
A26	Sørlandsparken - Voiebyen
M2	Hånes - Voiebyen
M2	Hånes - Kvadraturen
M2	Sørlandssenteret - Lauvåsen - Hånes - Voiebyen
M2	Hånes / Kjevik-Tveit - Voiebyen
N2	Hånes - Lund - Kvadraturen
N3	Søm - Slettheia
N17	Tømmerstø - Kvadraturen
M3	Søm - Slettheia
N3	Søm - Slettheia
08	Rona - Randesund
17	Tømmerstø - Hellemyr
17	Tømmerstø-Frikstad - Hellemyr
18	Tømmerstø Odderhei-Holte - Hellemyr
18	Dvergsnes - Hellemyr
A18	Tømmerstø Odderhei-Holte - Eg-Sykehuset
35	Kristiansand - Kjevik-Brattvollsheia
35	Kristiansand - Kjevik-Brattvollsheia / Grødum
35	Rona - Kjevik-Tveit
36	Kristiansand - Tveit-Grødum
36	Ve - Tveit-Grødum
37	Kristiansand - Birkeland
37	Kristiansand - Birkeland om Dønnestad
100	Kristiansand - Lillesand - Grimstad - Arendal
139	Høvåg-Lillesand - Kristiansand
220	Ve - Solsletta-Grødum-Dønnestad
266	Søm - Kristiansand Cathedral School
900	Farsund-Mandal - Kristiansand - Kjevik

== Tourism ==
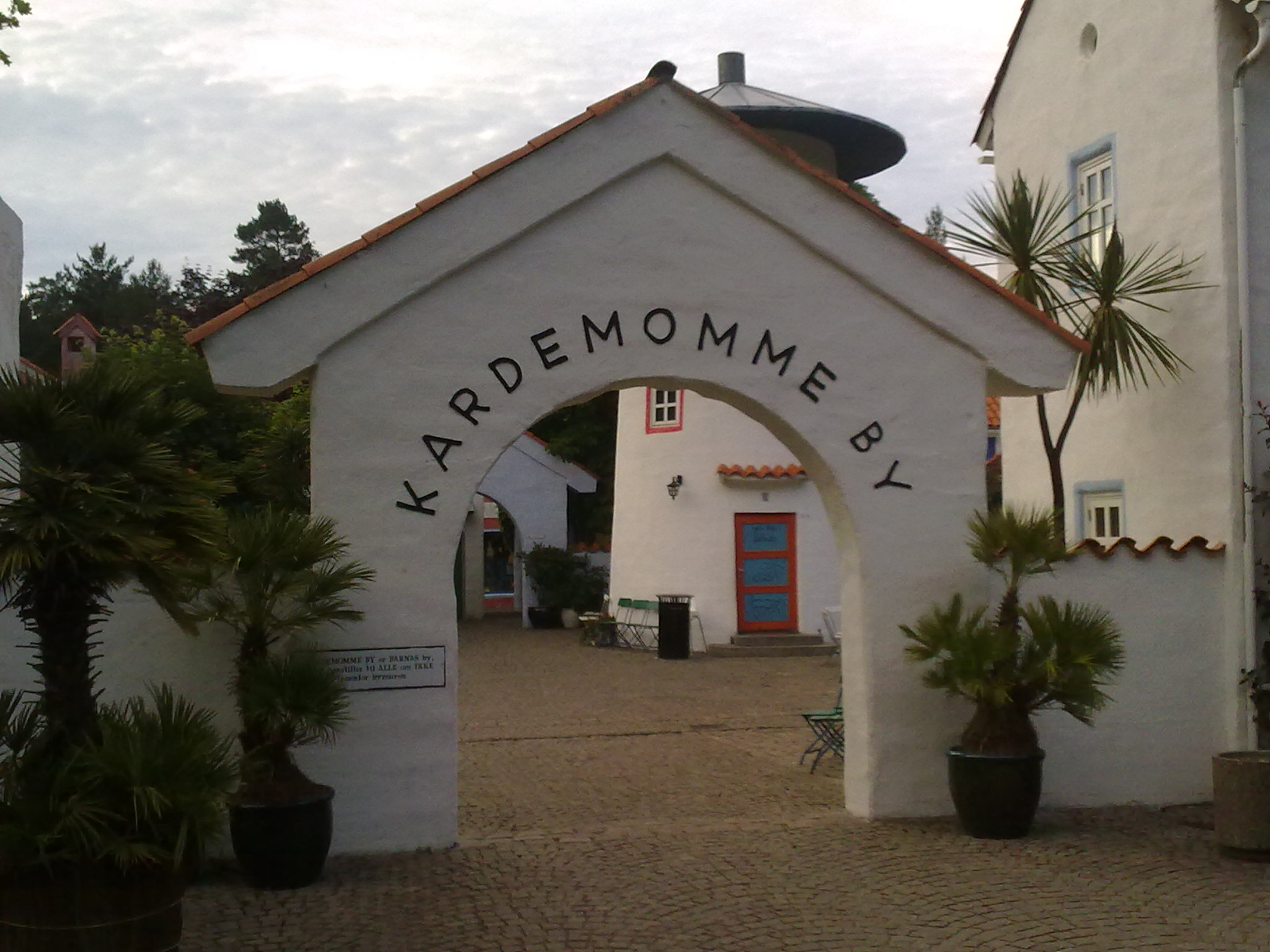
Kardemommeby in Kristiansand Zoo and Amusement Park

Kristiansand Zoo and Amusement Park is the largest zoo in Norway and the second most visited tourist attraction in Norway after Holmenkollen, Oslo. The park also includes a tivoli and a waterpark. There are some hotels located in the area for visitors. Abrahavn is a resort in the zoo.

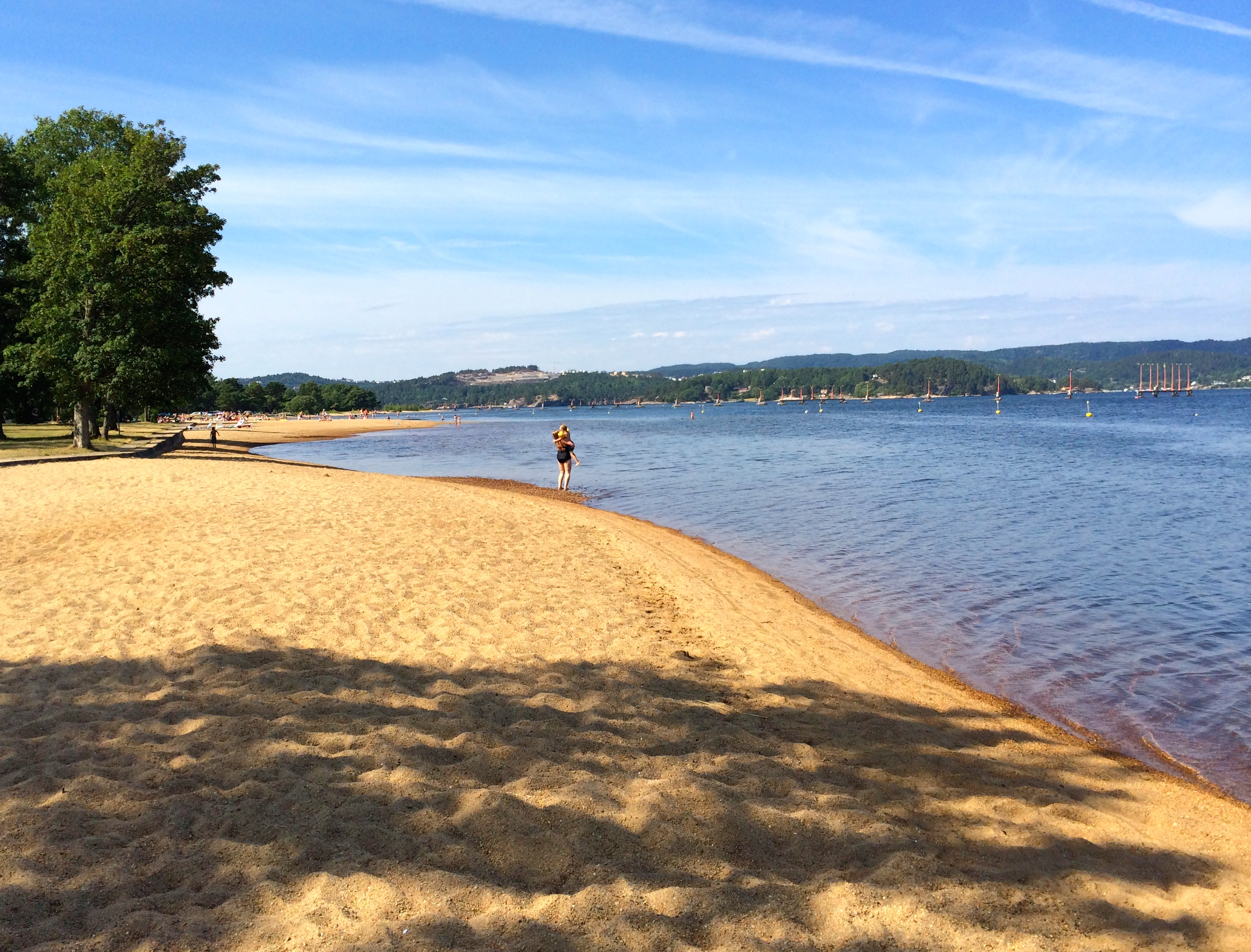
Hamresanden Beach

Randesund is a popular vacation area with a lot of cabins for rent at small islands or on the mainland. Hamresanden camping is a popular camping place with the beach. There is also a bible camp there. Kristiansand Travpark is a racetrack located between the zoo and Sørlandsparken.

== Shopping ==
Sørlandsparken is located in Oddernes. The industrial shopping park includes Norway's largest mall Sørlandssenteret with over 195 stores.

Rona Mall is a local mall located at Rona, Søm. The mall includes a fitness center, dentist, pharmacy, grocery store and a hair salon. On top of the mall, there is apartments. Rona Mall is located off the highway E18 and besides County Road 401.

Hånes Mall is a small local mall for the neighborhoods at Hånes, it is a part of an apartment building and has a grocery store and a hair salon. Hånes Mall is located in the neighborhood Vigvoll.

Lauvåsen Mall is a mall with a fitness center and hair salon. It is located off Norwegian National Road 41 between Grovikheia and Landauvåsen.

=== Photos ===
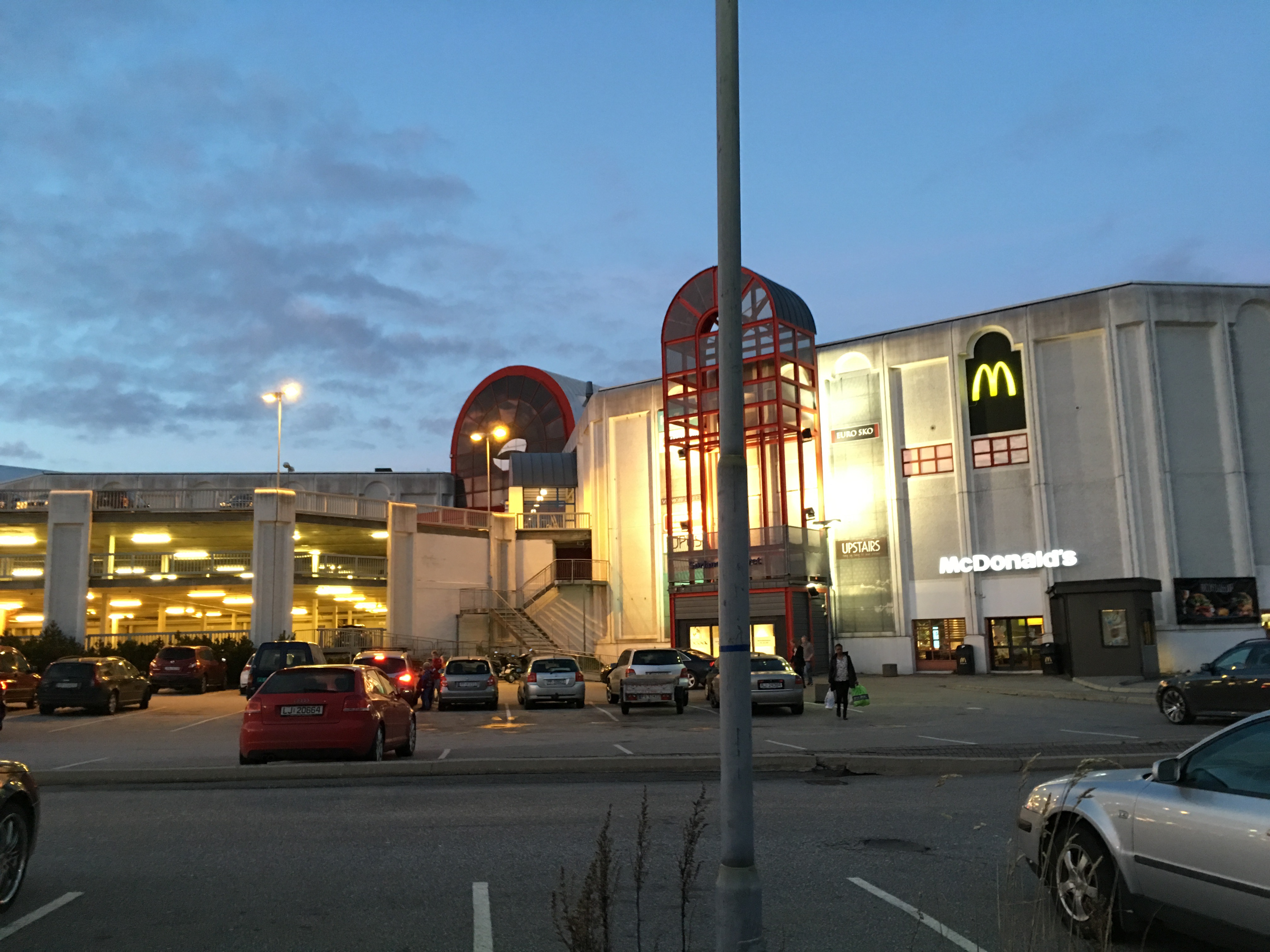
Sørlandssenteret

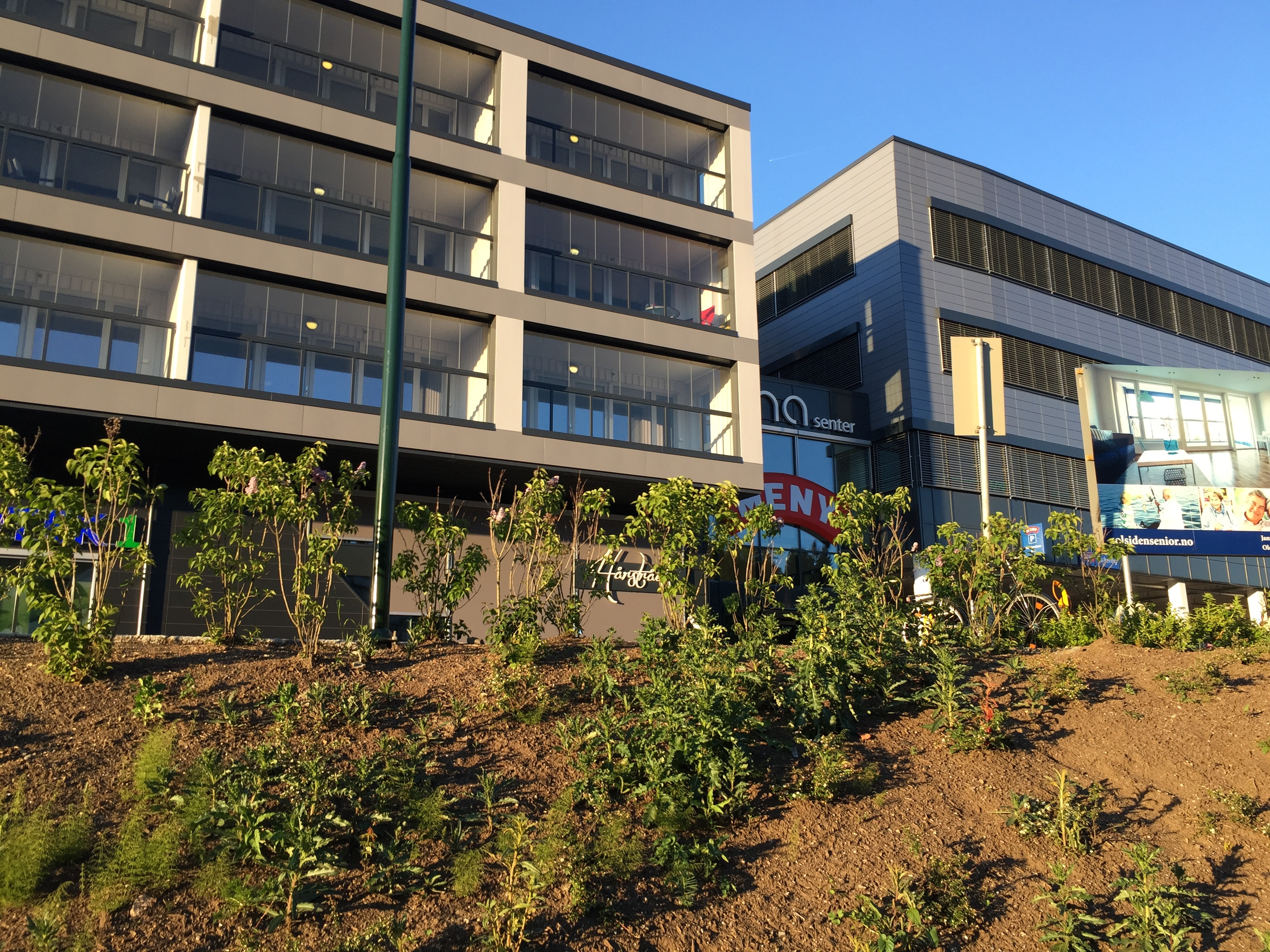
Rona Mall

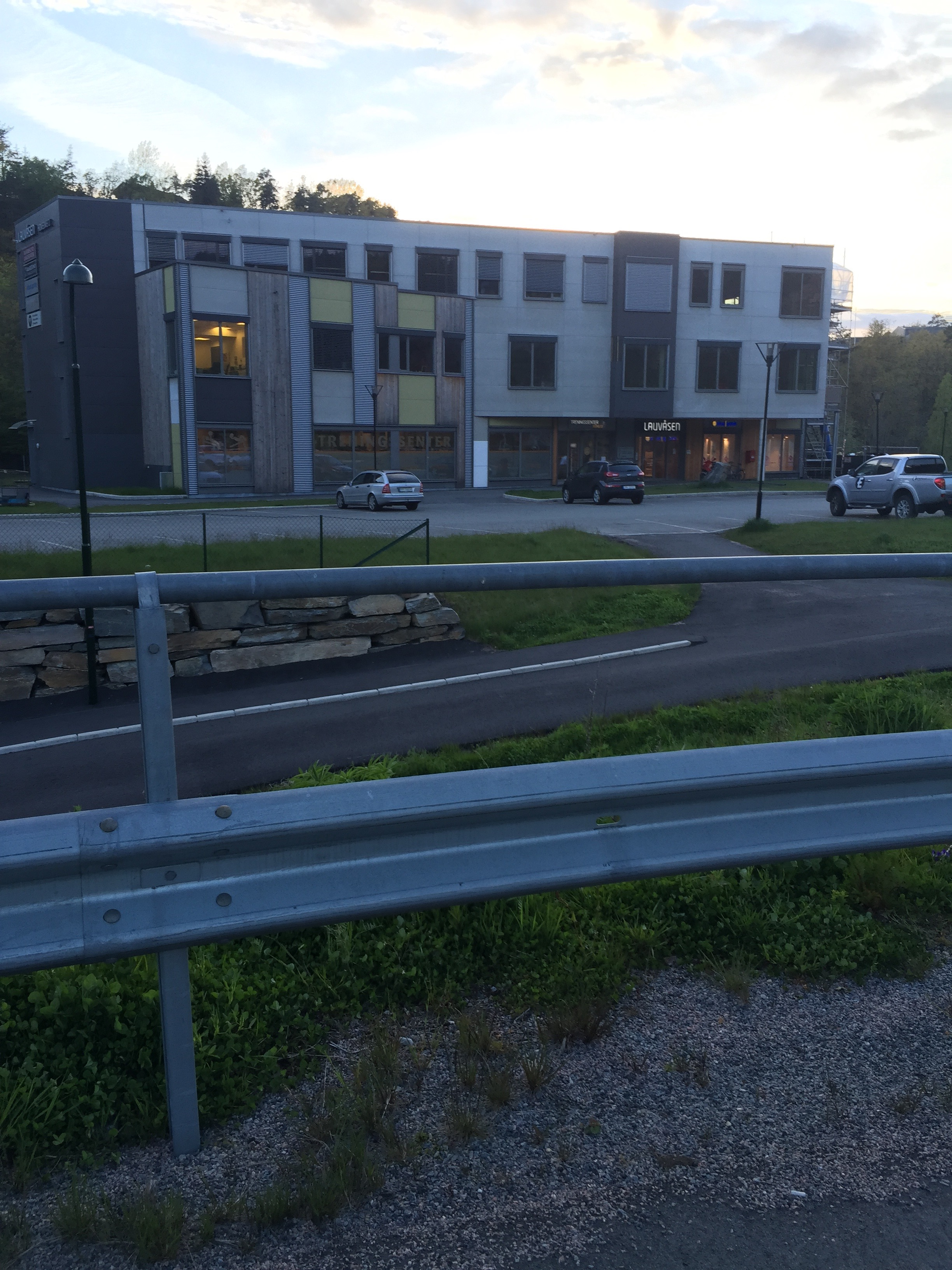
Lauvåsen Mall

== Religion ==
There are four churches in Oddernes. In Randesund, Randesund Church was built in 1864, it has a capacity of 450 people and is located at Frikstad. The church is built out of tree and there is a graveyard with the church. Søm Church was built in 2004. The windows was designed by Kjell Nupen and has a capacity of 400 people. The church was Kristiansand's "Thousand years building" since the construction started in the new millennium (Year 2000).

Hånes Church was built in 1986, it has the capacity of 300 people and built by bricks, there is no graveyard with Hånes church. Tveit Church is the oldest church in Oddernes, it was built in 1100 by stone. In 1831, a tower was built on the top of the church and in 1867 a restaurant was built in the church. Tveit church has a capacity of 450 people, there is a graveyard with the church and it is a nave church. The church is located with Ryen of Norwegian National Road 41.

Oddernes Church is not located in the Oddernes borough, but in the neighboring Lund borough with the University. The reason is that Lund was a part of the Oddernes municipality before it became a part of Kristiansand, and since then the borders of the boroughs have been re-drawn.

=== Photos ===
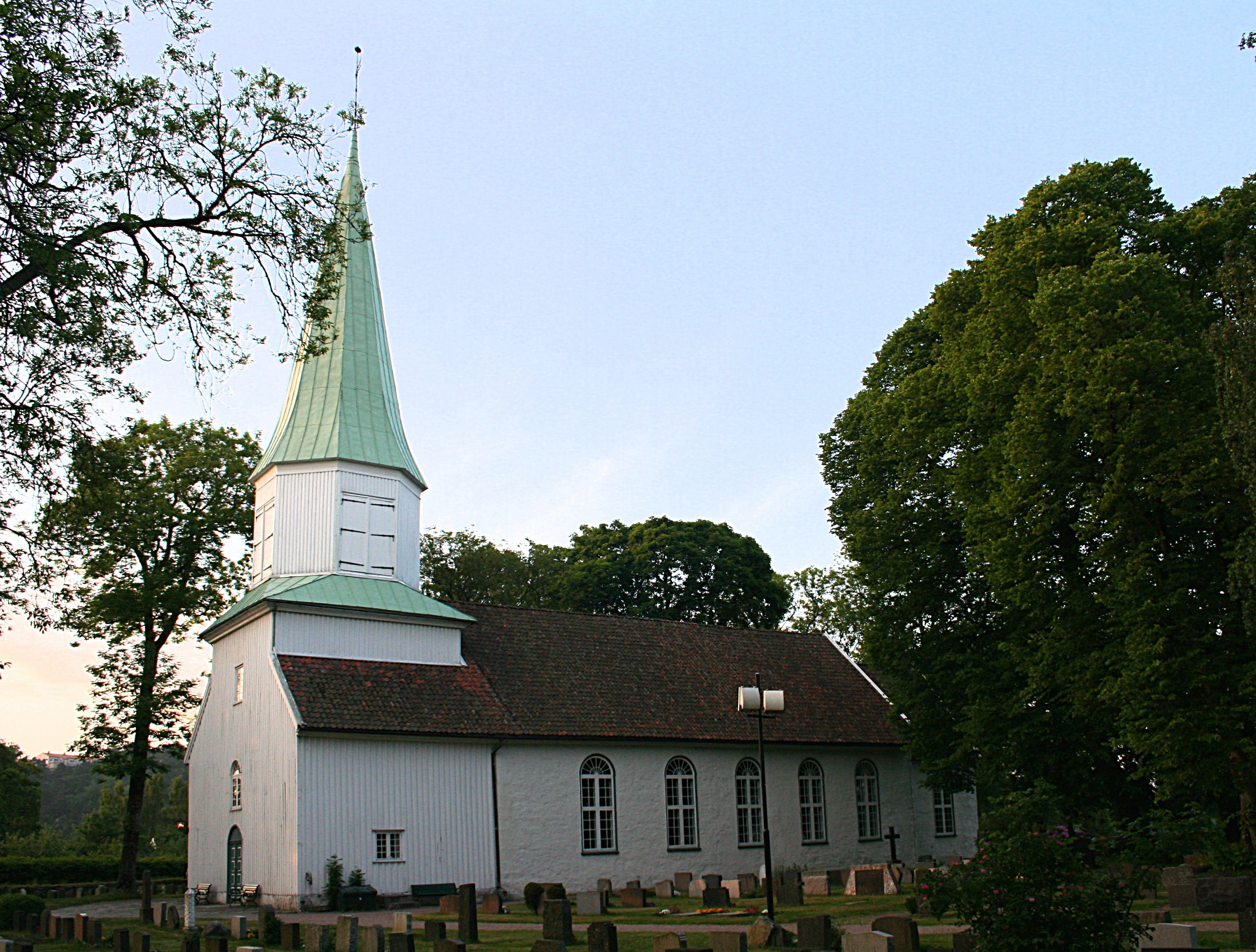
Oddernes Church which is located at Lund

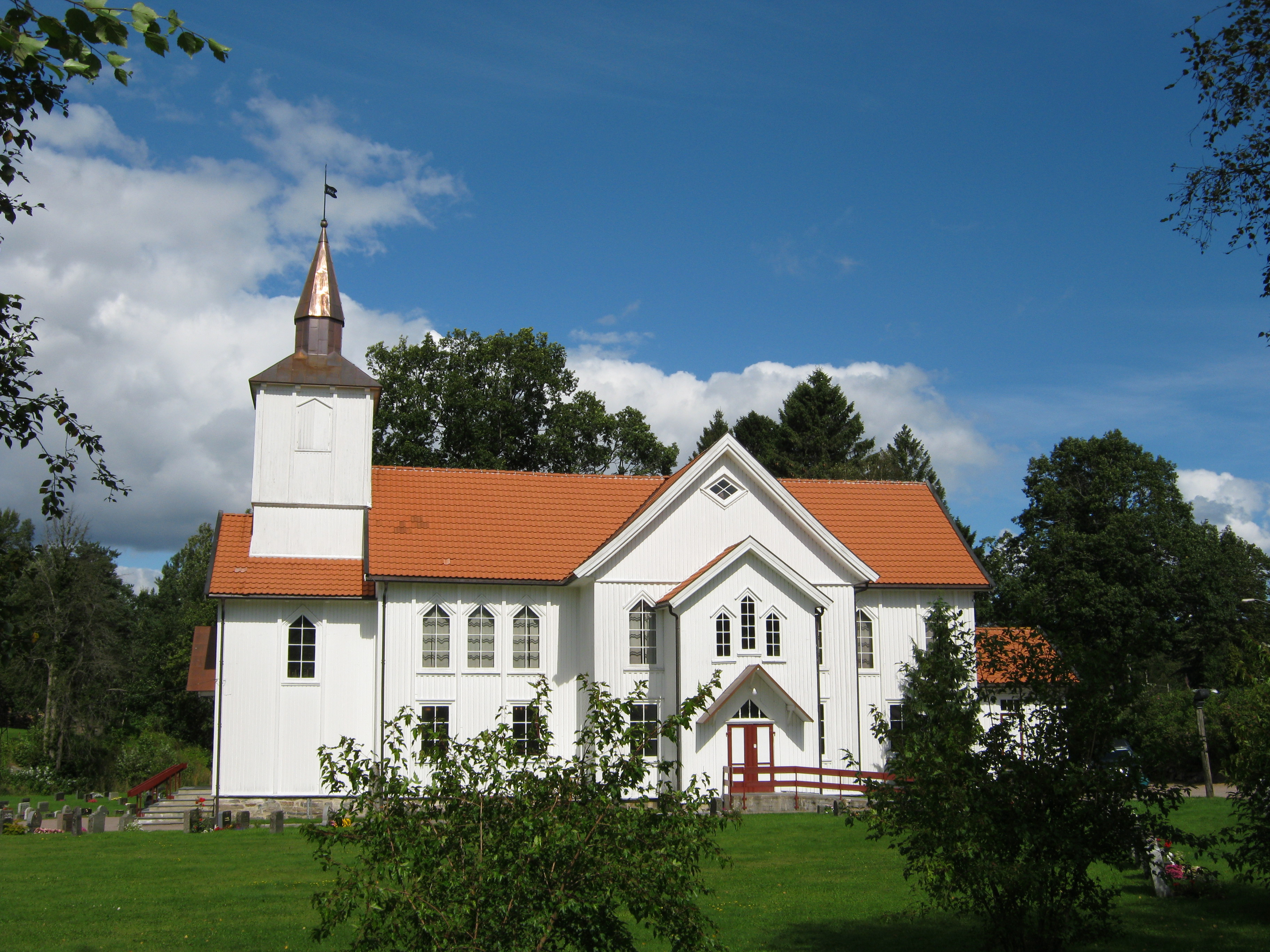
Randesund Church

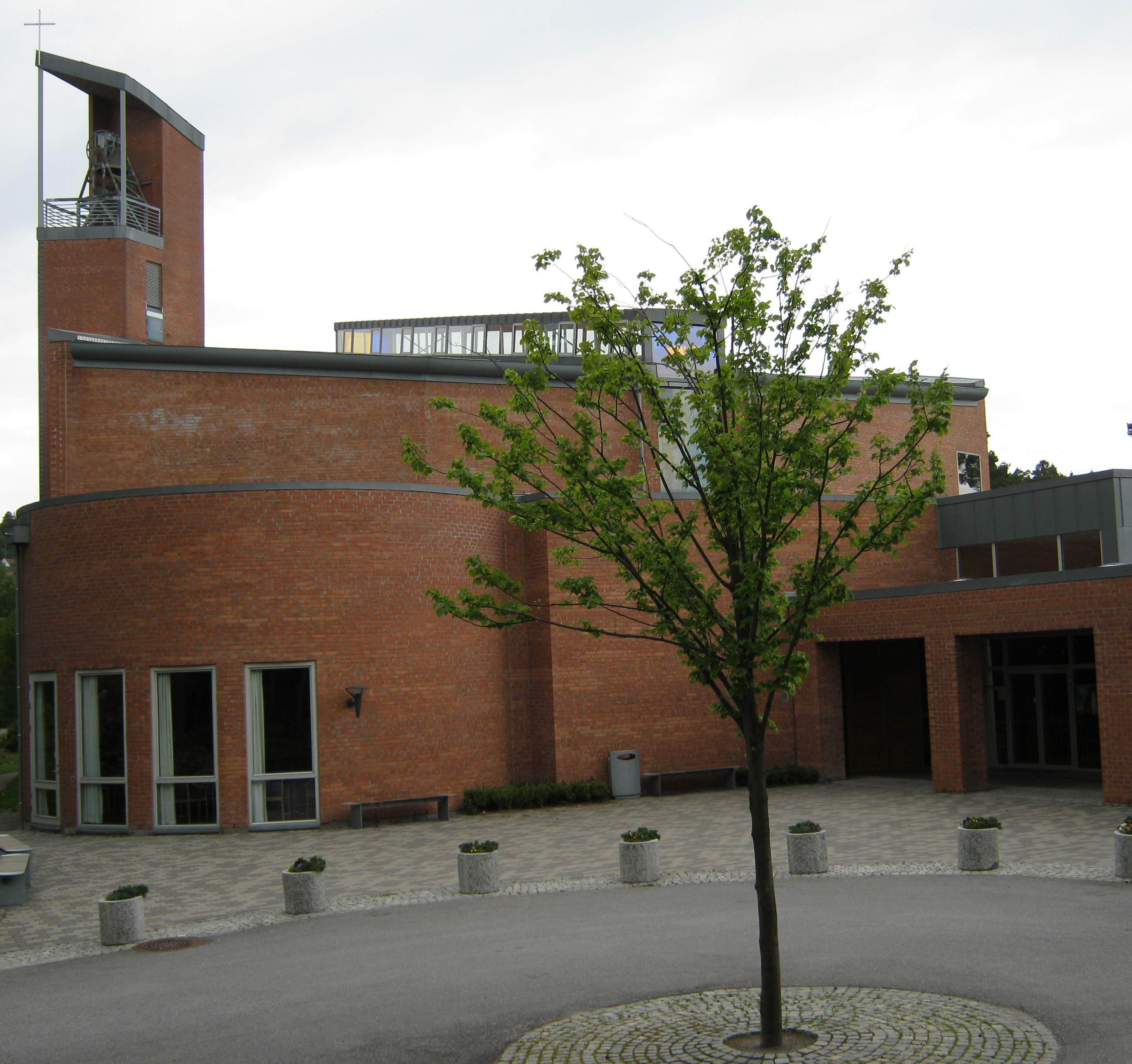
Søm Church

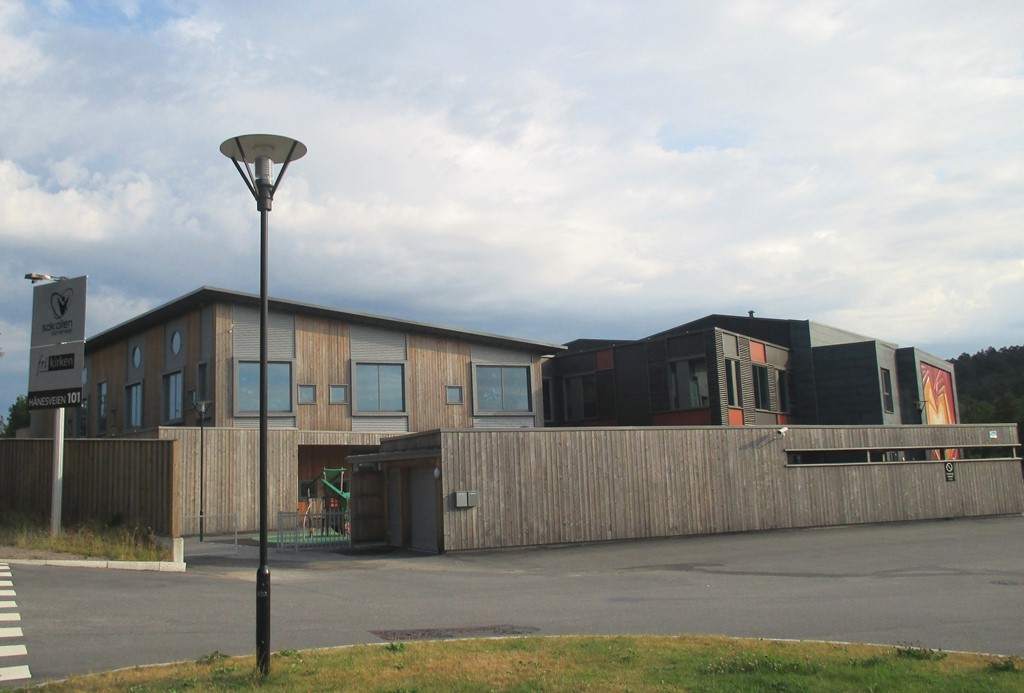
Hånes Free Church

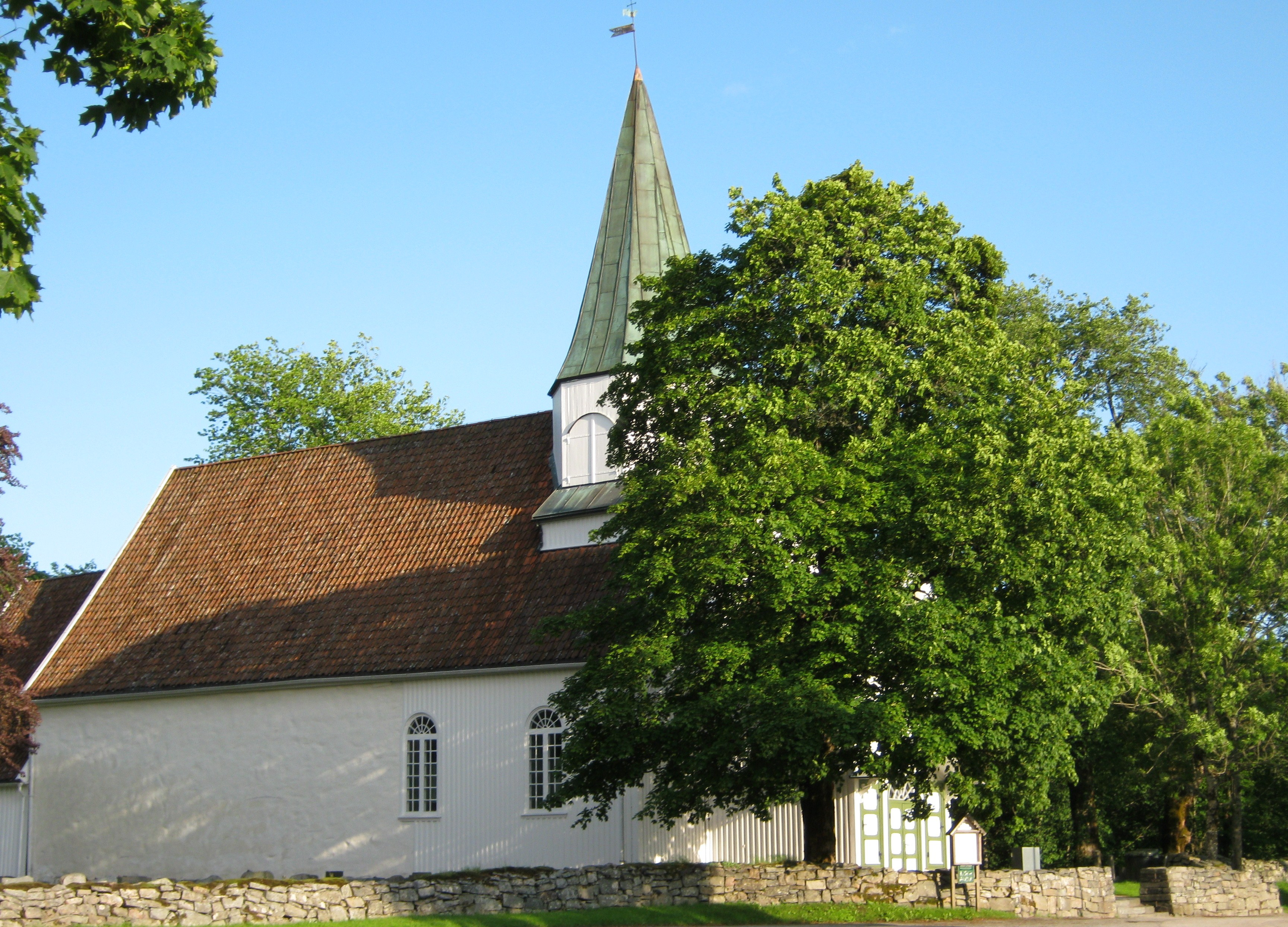
Tveit Church

== Society and environment ==
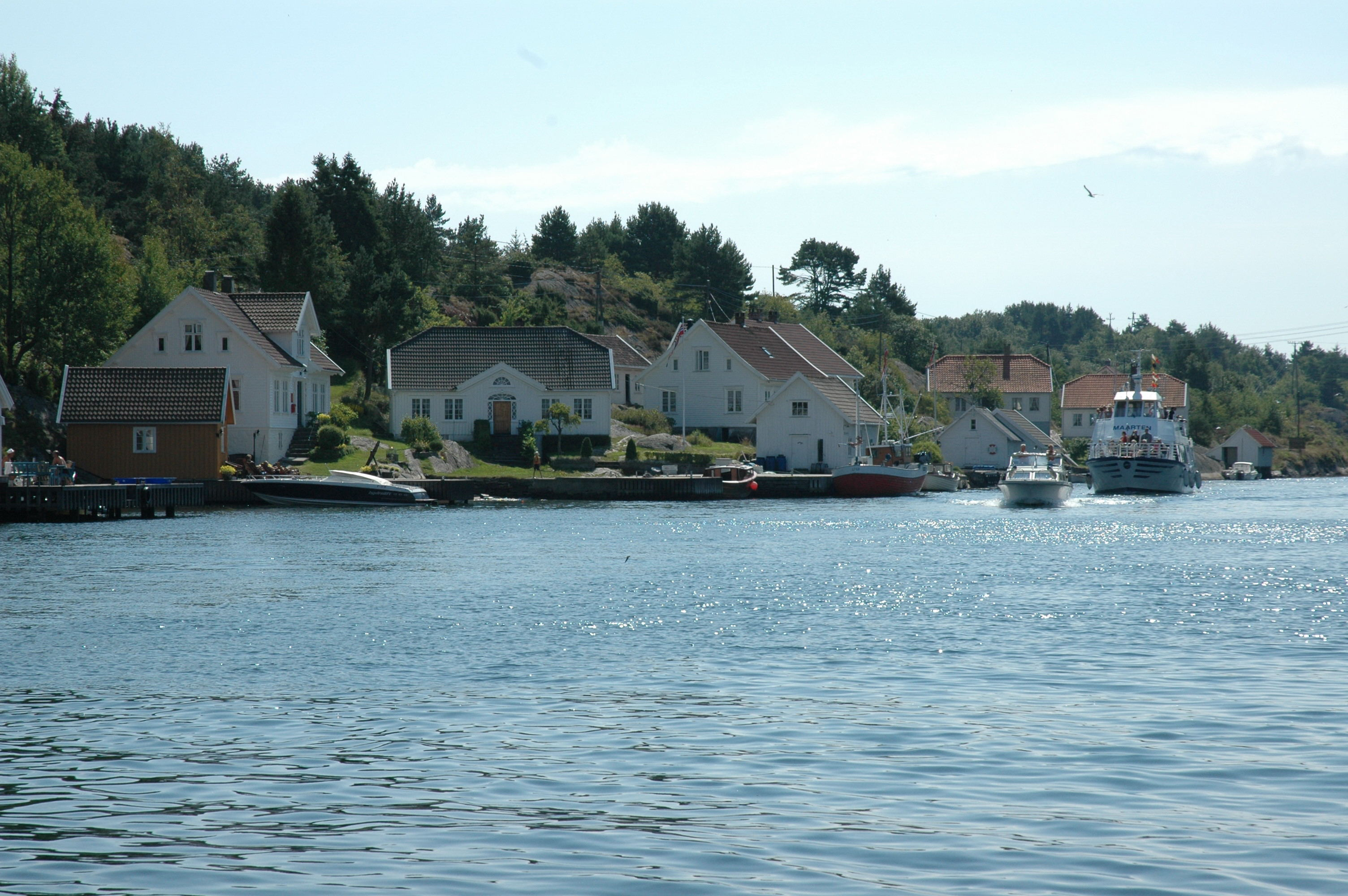
Skippergada is a maritime natural canal in Randøya

Oddernes mostly consists of neighborhoods and farms. The Tveit area and large parts of Randesund are more agricultural, while the districts of Søm and Hånes and the neighborhoods of Tømmerstø and Hamresanden are all in the urban zone.

Randesund includes large parts of the Southern Norway archipelago. It is also popular to have a cottage on the shore of Randesund. Populated islands off the shore of Randesund are Herøya and Randøya. Tømmerstø, Rabbesvik, Holte, Odderhei and Dvergsnes all fall within the part of Randesund known as Tømmerstø. This part of Randesund consists of typical Norwegian neighborhoods, but with a bit larger houses and has been criticized as an upper-middle-class neighborhood, especially Dvergsnes. Aside from the suburban areas in Tømmerstø, Randesund is mostly agricultural as one approaches Lillesand Municipality. Randesund has 2,000 people, of whom 7% come from a non-Norwegian background, the lowest percentagein Kristiansand and second to last on the list of most populated immigrant places in Kristiansand after Gimlekollen and before Flekkerøy.

Søm mostly consists of neighborhoods from the 1970s. Søm only has 10% non-Norwegian citizens and is one of the areas in Kristiansand with the lowest percentage of immigrants, despite being the most populated part of Oddernes with 9,000 people. Søm is a typical urban neighborhood of a city.

Hånes also mostly consist of neighborhoods. Some of Norway's most expensive properties were sold on Hånestangen. Other than that, Hånes has a wide range of apartment buildings and typical Norwegian neighborhoods. Hånes has a population of 4,000 of whom 18% come from a non-Norwegian background, meaning Hånes is the place in Oddernes with most immigrants, and the sixth most popular place for immigrants in Kristiansand after Tinnheia.

Tveit is the largest part of the borough by area, but it also has the smallest population of only about 1,000 people. Tveit is home to most of the farms in Kristiansand and only a few residential neighborhoods like Hamresanden, Brattvollsheia, and Solsletta.

=== Photos ===
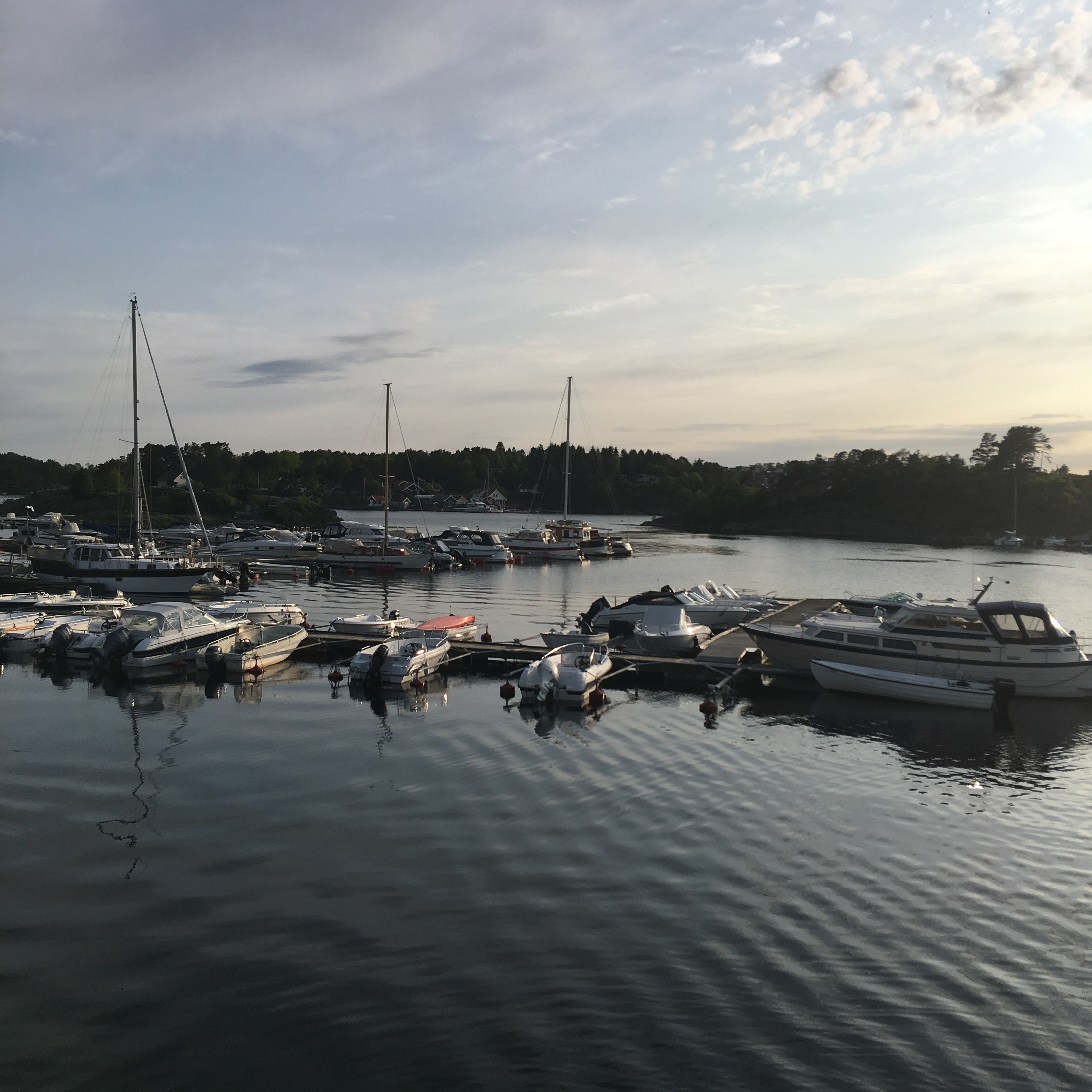
Fidjekilen Harbor in Tømmerstø

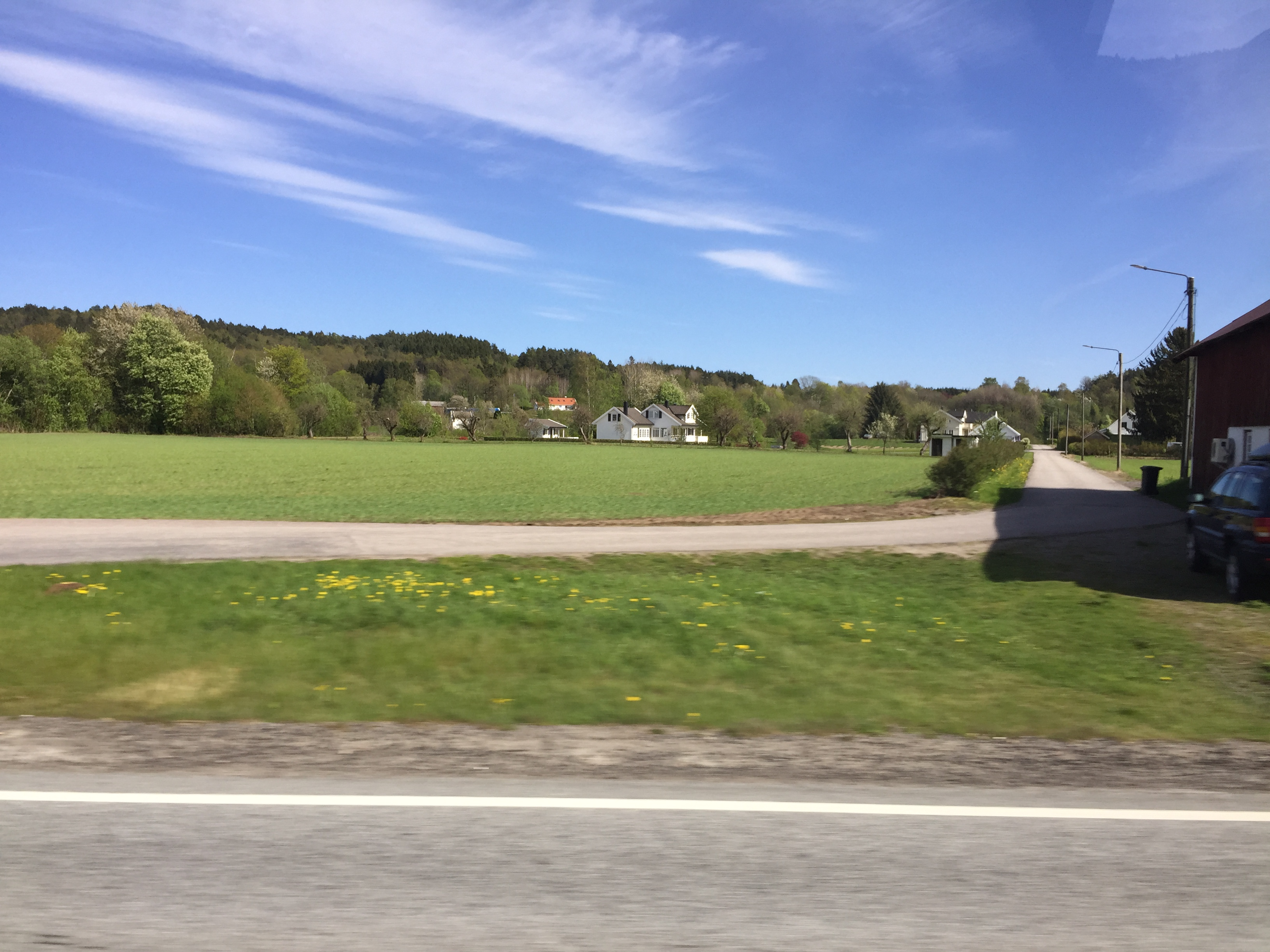
Farms at Tveit

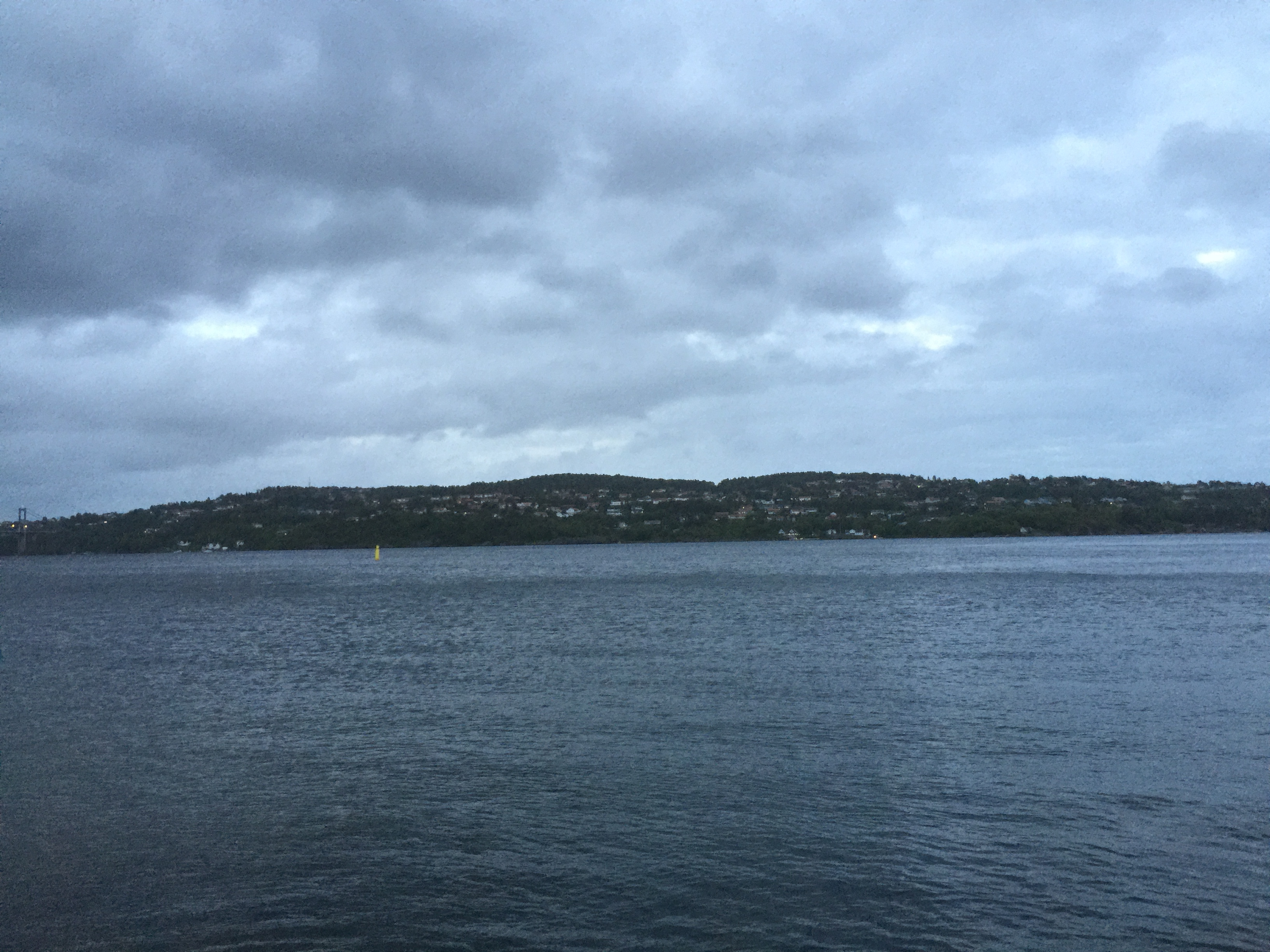
View of Søm from Marvika

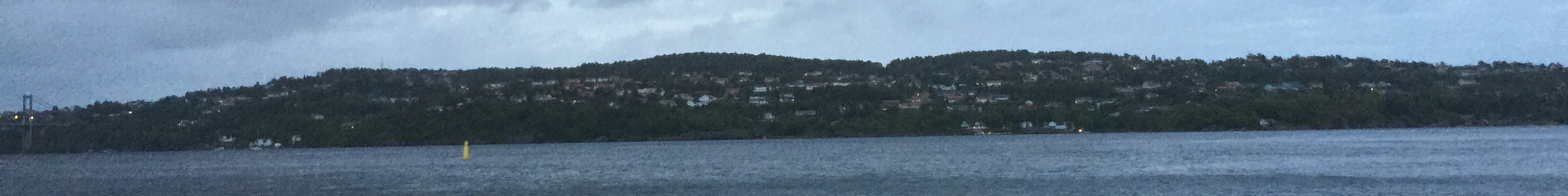
Søm seen from Marvika

== See also ==
- Oddernes Church
- Oddernes stone
- List of former municipalities of Norway
