= Vegårshei =

Vegårshei may refer to:

== Places ==
- Vegårshei Municipality, a municipality in Agder county, Norway
- Vegårshei Church, a church in Vegårshei Municipality in Agder county, Norway
- Vegårshei Station, a railway station in Vegårshei Municipality in Agder county, Norway

== Other ==
- Vegårshei IL, a sports club based in Vegårshei Municipality in Agder county, Norway
