= Flosta =

Flosta may refer to:

== Places ==
- Flosta, Arendal, a village in Arendal Municipality in Agder county, Norway
- Flosta Municipality, a former municipality in the old Aust-Agder county, Norway
- Flosta island, or Flosterøya, an island in Arendal Municipality in Agder county, Norway
- Flosta Church, a church in Arendal Municipality in Agder county, Norway

== Other ==
- Flosta IL, a sports club based in Arendal Municipality in Agder county, Norway
