= Norwegian County Road 414 =

Road in Agder county, Norway

Coordinates: 58.682269°N 08.819317°E

County Road 414
- Bokmål: Fylkesvei 414; Nynorsk: Fylkesveg 414

Route information
- Maintained by Norwegian Public Roads Administration
- Length: 12.1 km (7.5 mi)

Major junctions
- North end: Fv91 Høl
- Fv416 Myra
- South end: Fv415 Ubergsmoen

Location
- Country: Norway

Highway system
- Roads in Norway; National Roads; County Roads
← Fv413	→ Fv415

Norwegian county road 414 (Fv414) is a Norwegian county road in Agder county, Norway. The 12.1-kilometre (7.5 mi) long road runs between Ubergsmoen and Høl in Vegårshei Municipality. The south end of the road begins at a junction with Norwegian County Road 415 at the Ekra farm in Ubergsmoen and heads north along the Hauglandselva river, through the village of Myra where the junction with Norwegian County Road 416 is located, past the Vegårshei Church, all the way to the north end of the road at the Høl farm. The road then turns into Norwegian County Road 91.
