= Øyna =

Village in Arendal Municipality, Norway

- Village
- Interactive map of Øyna
- Coordinates: 58.5086°N 08.9394°E
- Country: Norway
- Region: Southern Norway
- County: Agder
- District: Østre Agder
- Municipality: Arendal Municipality
- Elevation: 7 m (23 ft)
- Time zone: UTC+01:00 (CET)
  - Summer (DST): UTC+02:00 (CEST)
- Post Code: 4812 Kongshavn

Øyna is a village in Arendal Municipality in Agder county, Norway. The village is located at the far northeastern tip of the island of Tromøya. The village sits about 1.5 kilometres (0.93 mi) south of the village of Narestø on the neighboring island of Flosterøya.
