= Flosta, Arendal =

Village in Arendal Municipality, Norway

Flosta
- Village
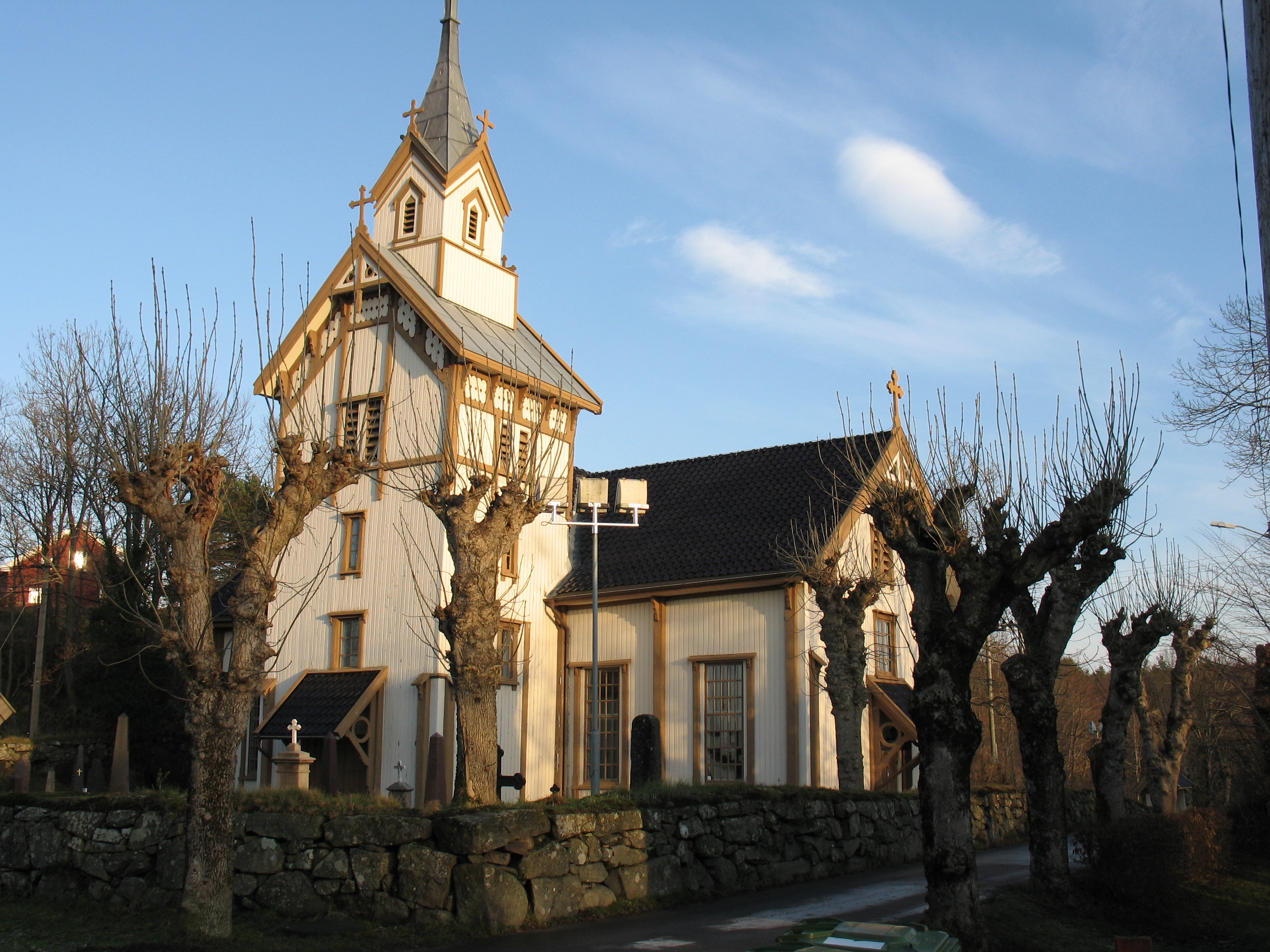
- View of the village church
- Interactive map of Flosta
- Coordinates: 58.52772°N 8.93235°E
- Country: Norway
- Region: Southern Norway
- County: Agder
- District: Østre Agder
- Municipality: Arendal Municipality
- Elevation: 26 m (85 ft)
- Time zone: UTC+01:00 (CET)
  - Summer (DST): UTC+02:00 (CEST)
- Post Code: 4810 Eydehavn

Flosta is a village in Arendal Municipality in Agder county, Norway. The village is located on the southern part of the island of Flosterøya, about 15 kilometres (9.3 mi) northeast of the town of Arendal, about 500 metres (1,600 ft) north of the village of Narestø, and about 5 kilometres (3.1 mi) south of the village of Kilsund. The historic Flosta Church is located in the village.
