= Mo, Agder =

Village in Vegårshei Municipality, Norway

Mo
- Village
- Interactive map of Mo
- Coordinates: 58.8342°N 08.8845°E
- Country: Norway
- Region: Southern Norway
- County: Agder
- District: Østre Agder
- Municipality: Vegårshei Municipality
- Elevation: 198 m (650 ft)
- Time zone: UTC+01:00 (CET)
  - Summer (DST): UTC+02:00 (CEST)
- Post Code: 4985 Vegårshei

Mo is a village in Vegårshei Municipality in Agder county, Norway. The village is located at the northernmost edge of the lake Vegår, about 10 kilometres (6.2 mi) north of the municipal centre of Myra.
