= Norwegian County Road 412 =

Road in Agder county, Norway

County Road 412
- Bokmål: Fylkesvei 412; Nynorsk: Fylkesveg 412

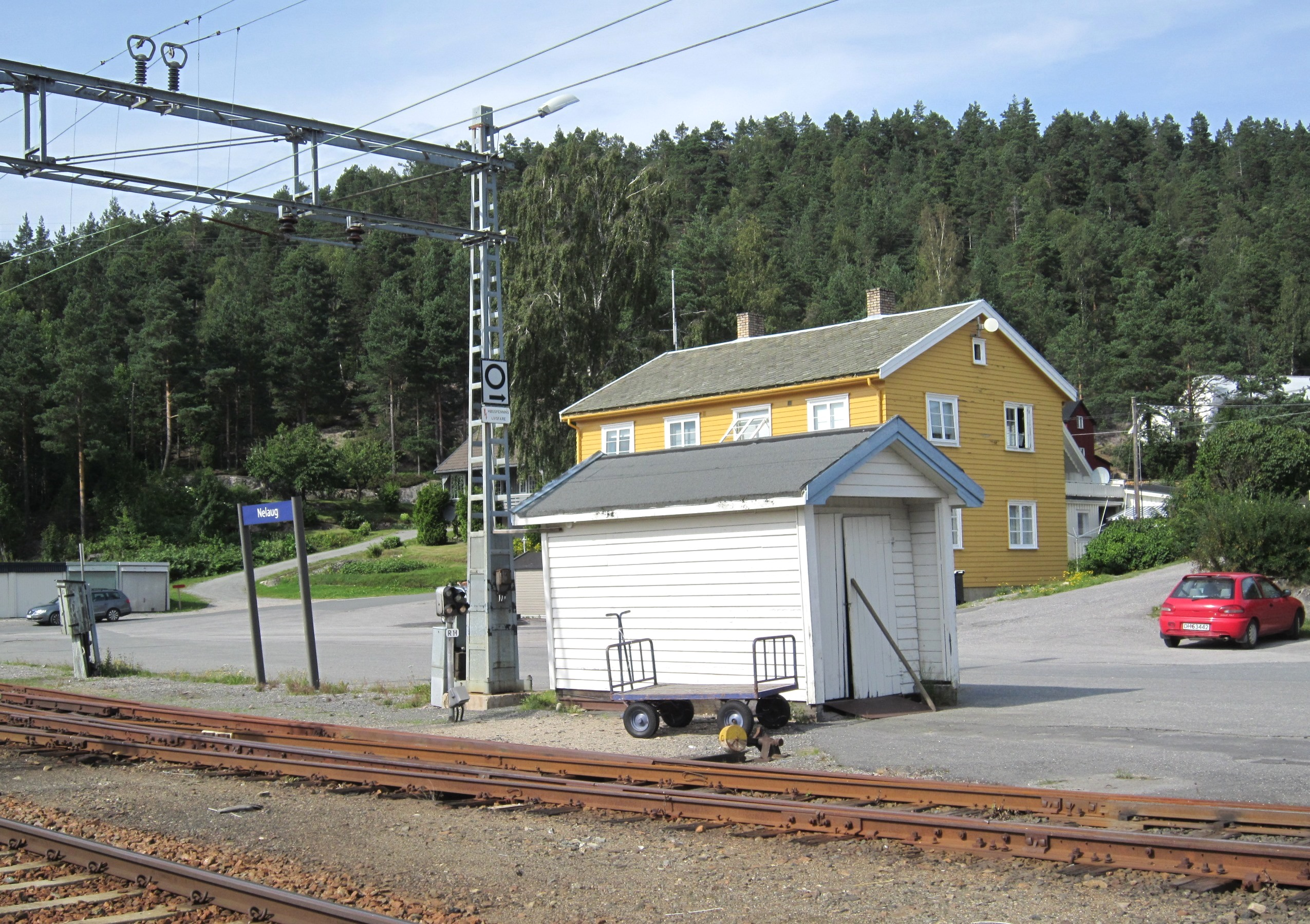
- The road ends at Nelaug Station

Route information
- Maintained by Norwegian Public Roads Administration
- Length: 4.592 km (2.853 mi)

Major junctions
- North end: Fv415 Hovde
- South end: Nelaug Station, Nelaug

Location
- Country: Norway

Highway system
- Roads in Norway; National Roads; County Roads
← Fv411	→ Fv413

Norwegian county road 412 (Fv412) is a Norwegian county road in Åmli Municipality in Agder county, Norway. The 4.59-kilometre (2.9 mi) long road runs between the Norwegian County Road 415 at the village of Hovde and Nelaug Station in the village of Nelaug.
