= Norwegian County Road 413 =

Road in Agder county, Norway

County Road 413
- Bokmål: Fylkesvei 413; Nynorsk: Fylkesveg 413

Route information
- Maintained by Norwegian Public Roads Administration
- Length: 15 km (9.3 mi)

Major junctions
- North end: Rv41 Dølemo, Åmli Municipality
- Fv272
- South end: Fv42 Mykland, Froland Municipality

Location
- Country: Norway

Highway system
- Roads in Norway; National Roads; County Roads
← Fv412	→ Fv414

Norwegian county road 413 (Fv413) is a Norwegian county road in Agder county, Norway. The 15-kilometre (9.3 mi) long road which runs between the village of Dølemo in Åmli Municipality and just west of the village of Mykland in Froland Municipality. The northern junction at Dølemo connects with the Norwegian National Road 41. Near the northern end of the road, the Norwegian County Road 272 which heads north into the Tovdalselva river valley. The southern junction joins the Norwegian County Road 42 just west of the village of Mykland. The road runs mostly through a rural forested area during its entire length.
