= Nesgrenda =

Village in Tvedestrand Municipality, Norway

- Village
- Interactive map of Nesgrenda
- Coordinates: 58.6308°N 08.8557°E
- Country: Norway
- Region: Southern Norway
- County: Agder
- District: Østre Agder
- Municipality: Tvedestrand Municipality

Area
  - Total: 0.29 km^{2} (0.11 sq mi)
- Elevation: 42 m (138 ft)

Population (2025)
  - Total: 272
  - Density: 938/km^{2} (2,430/sq mi)
- Time zone: UTC+01:00 (CET)
  - Summer (DST): UTC+02:00 (CEST)
- Post Code: 4934 Nes Verk

Nesgrenda is a village in Tvedestrand Municipality in Agder county, Norway. The village is located along the Norwegian County Road 415 about 7 kilometres (4.3 mi) west of the town of Tvedestrand and about 1 kilometre (0.62 mi) northwest of the village of Fiane and the European route E18 highway. The Næs jernverk (iron works) facility is located in the village.

The 0.29-square-kilometre (72-acre) village has a population (2025) of 272 and a population density of 938 inhabitants per square kilometre (2,430/sq mi).
