= Drangsholt =

Drangsholt is a Norwegian surname. Notable people with the surname include:

- Erling Drangsholt (1885–1950), Norwegian actor
- Ida Drangsholt (1892–1965), Norwegian writer
- Janne Stigen Drangsholt (born 1974), Norwegian philologist and novelist
- Tor Erik Drangsholt (1953–2020), Norwegian military officer
