= Stokkeland =

Stokkeland is a Norwegian surname. Notable people with the surname include:

- Espen Stokkeland (born 1968), Norwegian sailor
- Kai Ove Stokkeland (born 1978), Norwegian footballer and manager
- Kåre Stokkeland (1918–1985), Norwegian politician
