= Vegår =

Lake in Vegårshei, Norway

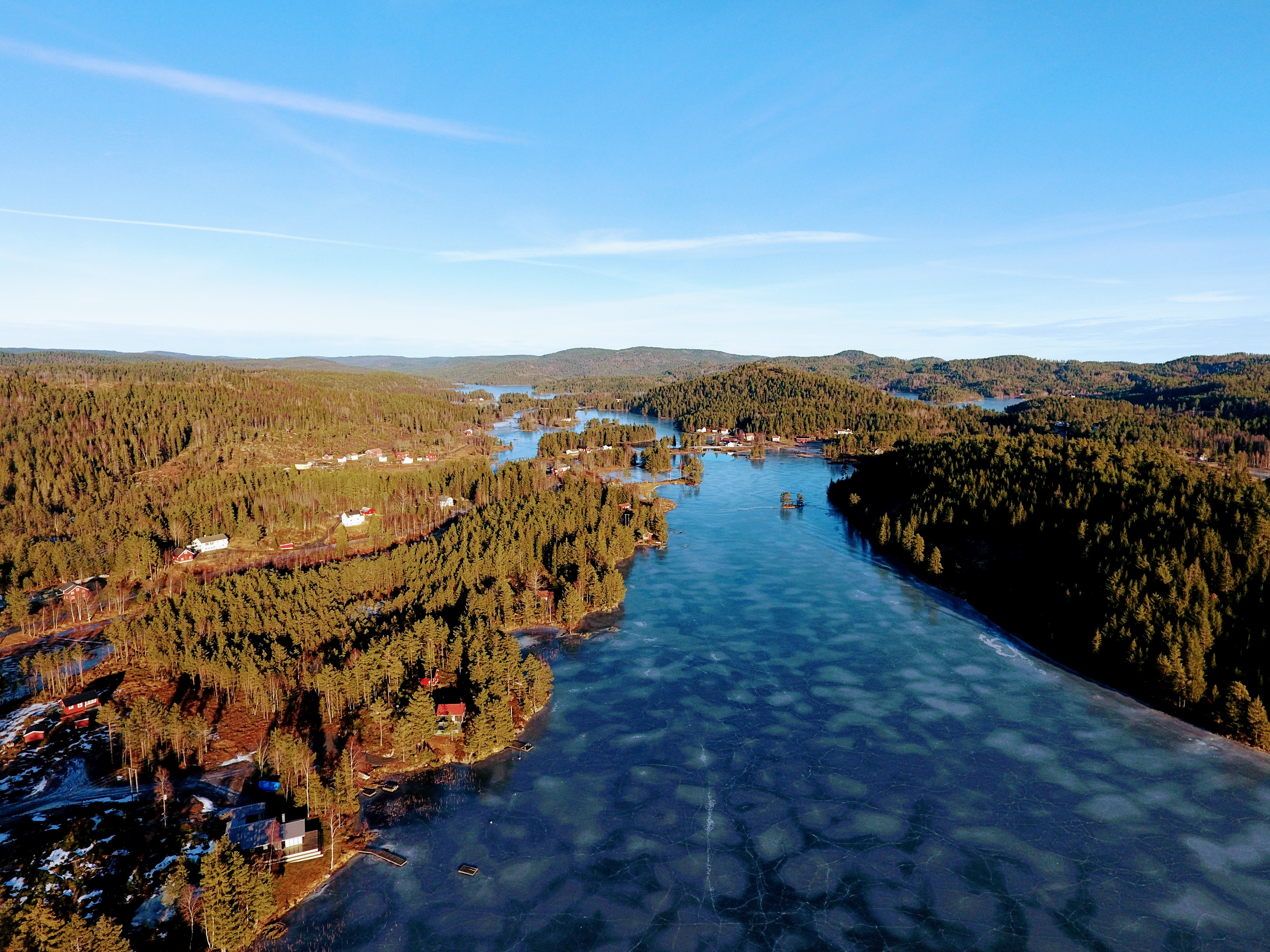
- Lake Vegår viewed from Sørfjorden; Credit: Magnus Aasen Aukland
- Interactive map of Vegår
- Location: Vegårshei Municipality, Agder
- Coordinates: 58.79703°N 8.77382°E
- Catchment area: 141 km^{2} (54 sq mi)
- Basin countries: Norway
- Max. length: 14.5 kilometres (9.0 mi)
- Max. width: 5 kilometres (3.1 mi)
- Surface area: 17.7 km^{2} (6.8 sq mi)
- Max. depth: 102 m (335 ft)
- Water volume: 337 km^{3} (81 cu mi)
- Shore length^{1}: 113.84 kilometres (70.74 mi)
- Surface elevation: 189 metres (620 ft)
- References: NVE
- ^{1} Shore length is not a well-defined measure.

Vegår is a lake in Vegårshei Municipality in Agder county, Norway. The 17.7-square-kilometre (6.8 sq mi) lake is located about 3 kilometres (1.9 mi) north of the municipal center of Myra and about 12 kilometres (7.5 mi) east of the village of Åmli in the neighboring Åmli Municipality.

The three largest parts of the lake are named Vestfjorden, Nordfjorden, and Sørfjorden. The deepest point of the lake, in the Nordfjorden area, reaches 102 metres (335 ft) below the surface of the water. There are many small islands in the lake, the largest of which is Furøya. The primary exit for the water in the lake is through the river Storelva which flows south through the village of Myra to Nesgrenda in Tvedestrand Municipality before turning northeast and flowing into the sea at the Sandnesfjorden.

Vegår supports one of the country's most long-lived and stable beaver populations, as well as a fish fauna consisting of European perch, brown trout, Arctic char, and European eel.

== Media gallery ==
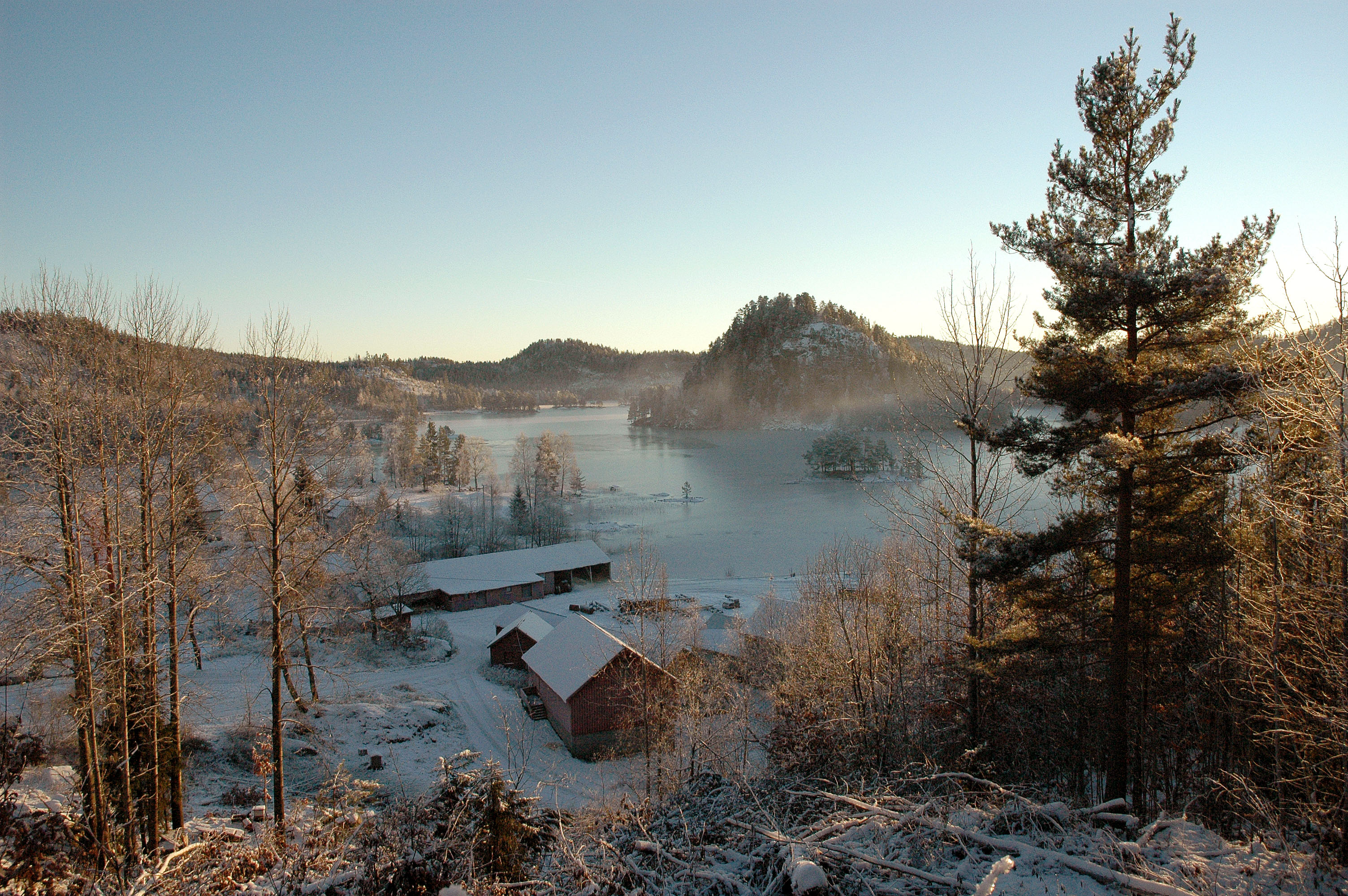
View near the Haukenesfjorden

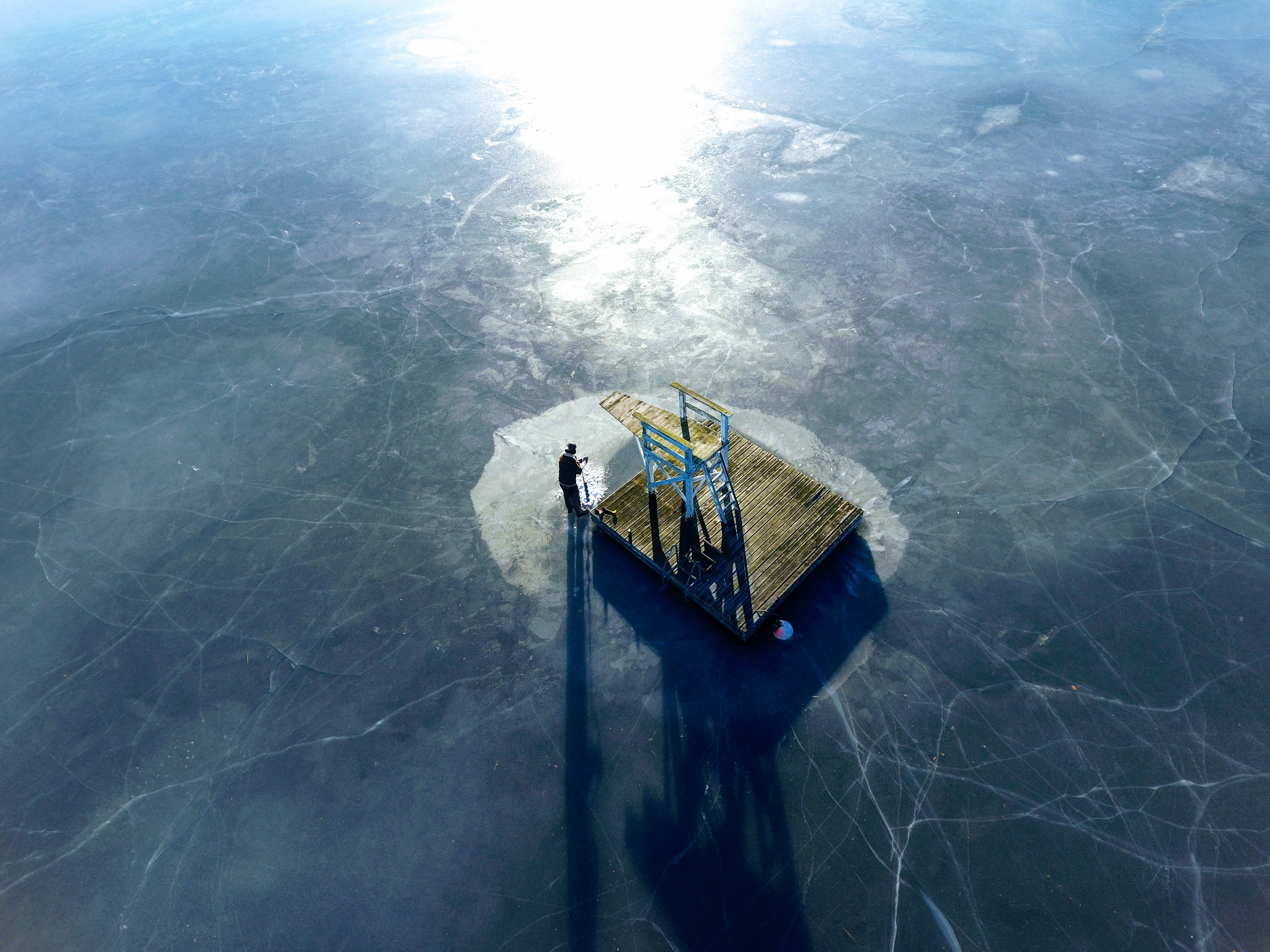
A floating dock in the lake

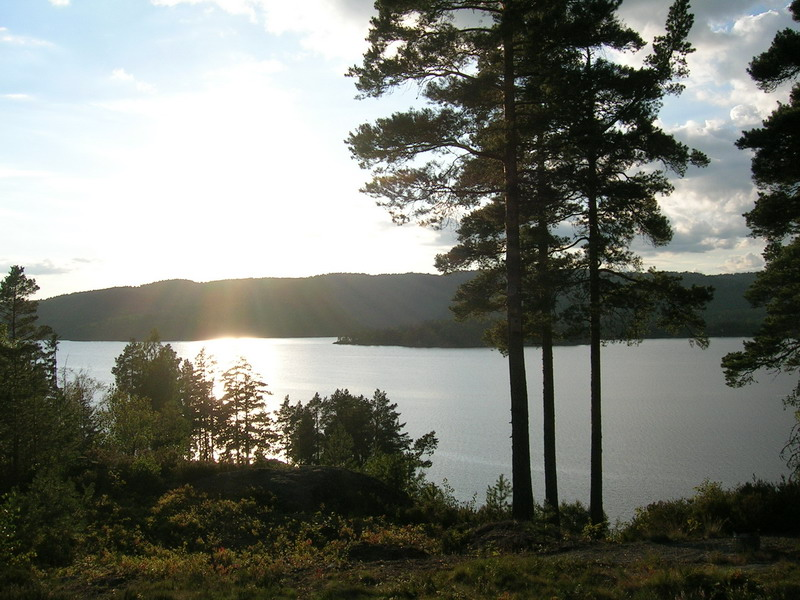
View of the lake

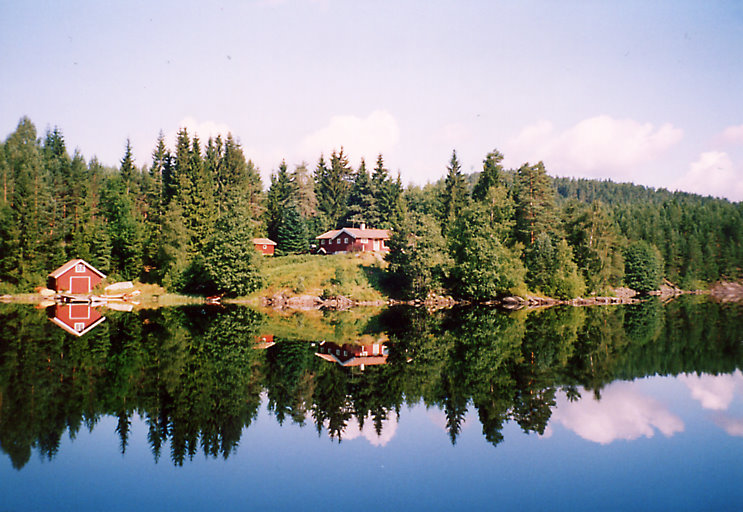
View of the shoreline

== See also ==
- List of lakes in Aust-Agder
- List of lakes in Norway
