= Seland =

Seland is a surname. Notable people with the surname include:

- Arve Seland (born 1963), Norwegian footballer
- Gudmund Seland (1907–1996), Norwegian resistance member and newspaper editor
- Hans Seland (1867–1949), Norwegian politician and author
- Johannes Seland (1912–1999), Norwegian politician
- Karstein Seland (1912–2005), Norwegian politician
- Tone Anne Alvestad Seland, Norwegian handball player
