= Ubergsmoen =

Village in Vegårshei Municipality, Norway

- Village
- Interactive map of Ubergsmoen
- Coordinates: 58.6803°N 08.8221°E
- Country: Norway
- Region: Southern Norway
- County: Agder
- District: Østre Agder
- Municipality: Vegårshei Municipality

Area
  - Total: 0.23 km^{2} (0.089 sq mi)
- Elevation: 79 m (259 ft)

Population (2020)
  - Total: 222
  - Density: 965/km^{2} (2,500/sq mi)
- Time zone: UTC+01:00 (CET)
  - Summer (DST): UTC+02:00 (CEST)
- Post Code: 4985 Vegårshei

Ubergsmoen is a village in Vegårshei Municipality in Agder county, Norway. The village is located at the junction of the Norwegian County Road 414 and Norwegian County Road 415. The lake Ubergsvann lies just south of the village and the mountain Ubergsfjell lies on the west side of the village.

The 0.23-square-kilometre (57-acre) village had a population (2020) of 222 and a population density of 965 inhabitants per square kilometre (2,500/sq mi). Since 2020, the population and area data for this village area has not been separately tracked by Statistics Norway.
