= Skagestad =

Skagestad is a surname. Notable people with the surname include:

- Bjørn Skagestad (born 1950), Norwegian actor
- Edvard Skagestad (born 1988), Norwegian footballer
- Gabriel Skagestad (1879-1952), Norwegian theologian and priest
- Sven Martin Skagestad (born 1995), Norwegian discus thrower
- Tormod Skagestad (1920–1997), Norwegian poet, novelist, playwright, actor and theatre director
