= Valvik =

Valvik is a surname. Notable people with the surname include:

- Monica Valvik (born 1970), Norwegian cyclist
- Svein Inge Valvik (born 1956), Norwegian discus thrower
