= Kalvøysund =

Village in Arendal Municipality, Norway

- Village
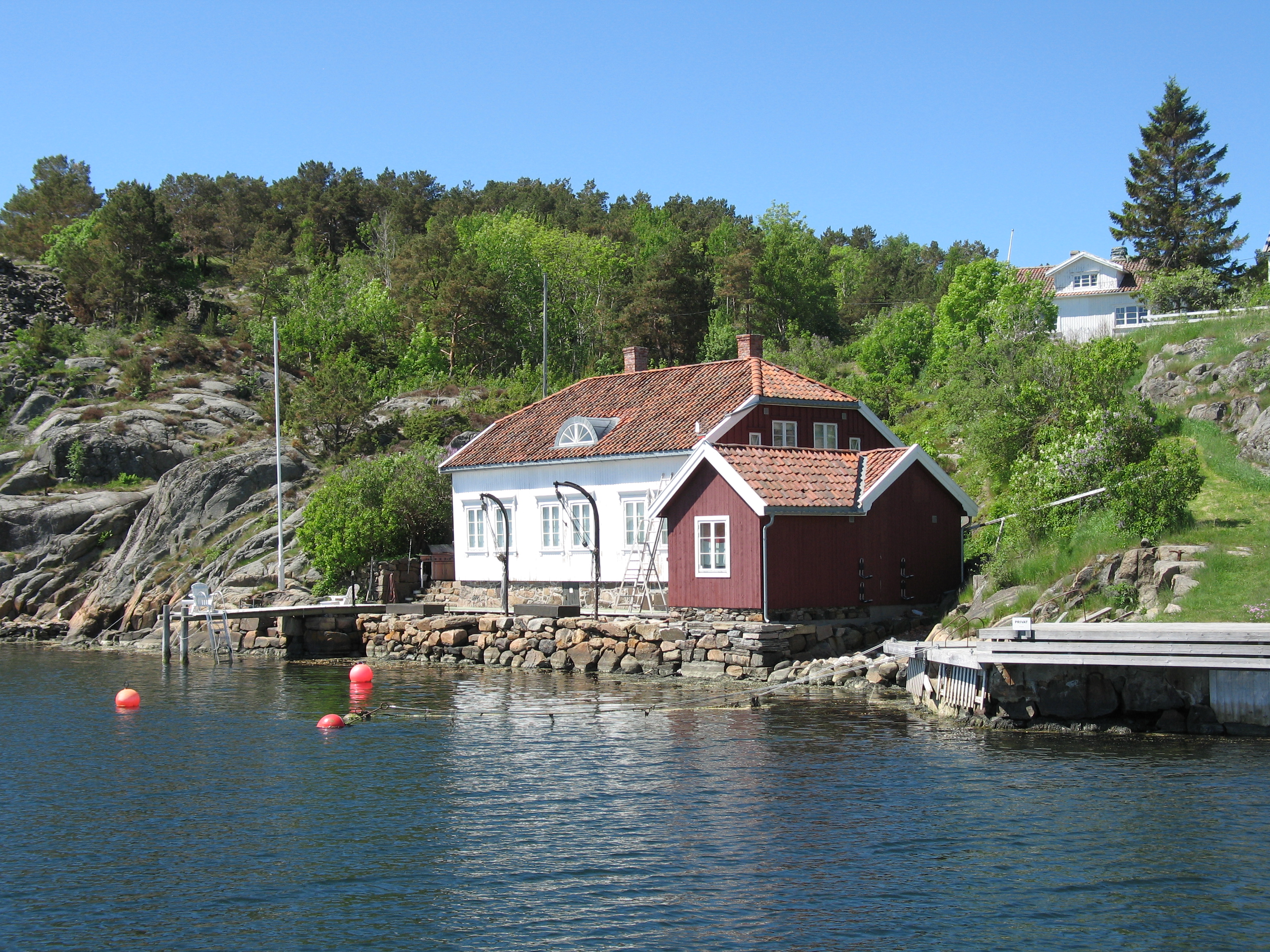
- View of the village shoreline
- Interactive map of Kalvøysund
- Coordinates: 58.5407°N 08.9768°E
- Country: Norway
- Region: Southern Norway
- County: Agder
- District: Østre Agder
- Municipality: Arendal Municipality
- Elevation: 11 m (36 ft)
- Time zone: UTC+01:00 (CET)
  - Summer (DST): UTC+02:00 (CEST)
- Post Codes: 4920 Staubø

Kalvøysund is a village in Arendal Municipality in Agder county, Norway. The village is located on the eastern shore of the island of Flosterøya, about 2 kilometres (1.2 mi) south of the village of Kilsund and about 3 kilometres (1.9 mi) northeast of the village of Narestø.

== Military History ==
Kalvøysund was the site of an old German fortress to defend the coastline during the German occupation of Norway in WW2. It was located on the island of Flosterøya. This 10-acre (4.0 ha) fortress was one of the largest in area that the Germans built in Norway. The fortress included 50 bunkers and other buildings and 4 emplacements for artillery. After the war ended and Norway was liberated, the Norwegian armed forces used it for military exercises. Now it is in the possession of the municipality and is a tourist destination.
