= Vegårshei Municipality =

Municipality in Agder, Norway

Vegårshei Municipality Vegårshei kommune
- Municipality
- Vegaarshei herred (historic name); Vegaardsheien herred (historic name)
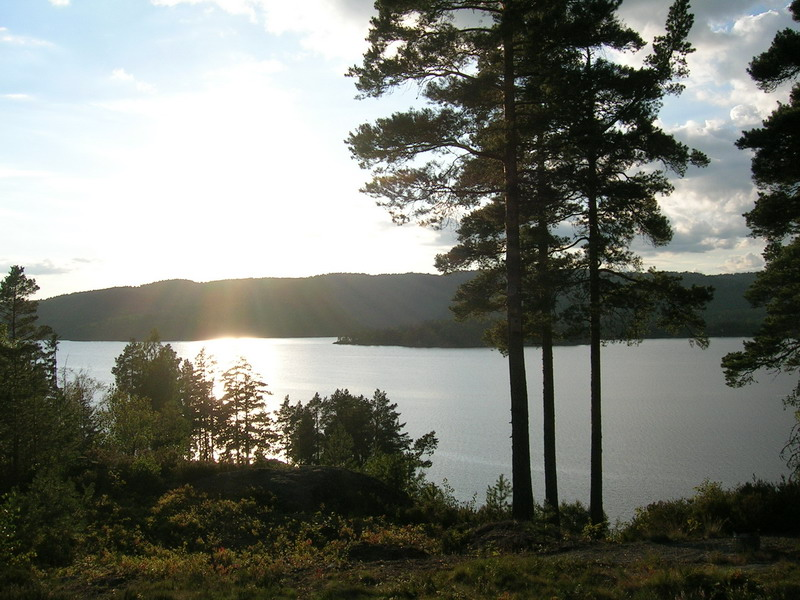
- View of the lake Vegår

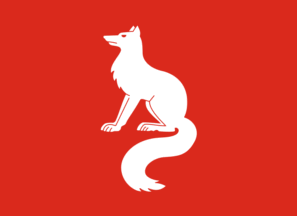
- Flag Coat of arms

- Agder within Norway

- Vegårshei within Agder
- Coordinates: 58°46′32″N 08°49′56″E
- Country: Norway
- County: Agder
- District: Sørlandet
- Established: 1 Jan 1838
  - Created as: Formannskapsdistrikt
- Administrative centre: Myra

Government
  - Mayor (2019): Kjetil Torp (KrF)

Area
  - Total: 355.65 km^{2} (137.32 sq mi)
  - Land: 321.76 km^{2} (124.23 sq mi)
  - Water: 33.89 km^{2} (13.09 sq mi) 9.5%
  - Rank: #249 in Norway
- Highest elevation: 525.07 m (1,722.7 ft)

Population (2026)
  - Total: 2,253
  - Rank: #267 in Norway
  - Density: 7/km^{2} (18/sq mi)
  - Change (10 years): ▲ +10.7%
- Demonym: Vegårsheiing

Official language
  - Norwegian form: Neutral
- Time zone: UTC+01:00 (CET)
  - Summer (DST): UTC+02:00 (CEST)
- ISO 3166 code: NO-4212
- Website: Official website

Vegårshei is a municipality in Agder county, Norway. It is located in the traditional district of Sørlandet. The administrative center is the village of Myra. Other villages in Vegårshei include Mo and Ubergsmoen.

The 355.65-square-kilometre (137.32 sq mi) municipality is the 249th largest by area out of the 357 municipalities in Norway. Vegårshei Municipality is the 267th most populous municipality in Norway with a population of 2,253. The municipality's population density is 7 inhabitants per square kilometre (18/sq mi) and its population has increased by 10.7% over the previous 10-year period. The population of Vegårshei Municipality reached its highest point in 1930, with 2,161 residents.

== General information ==
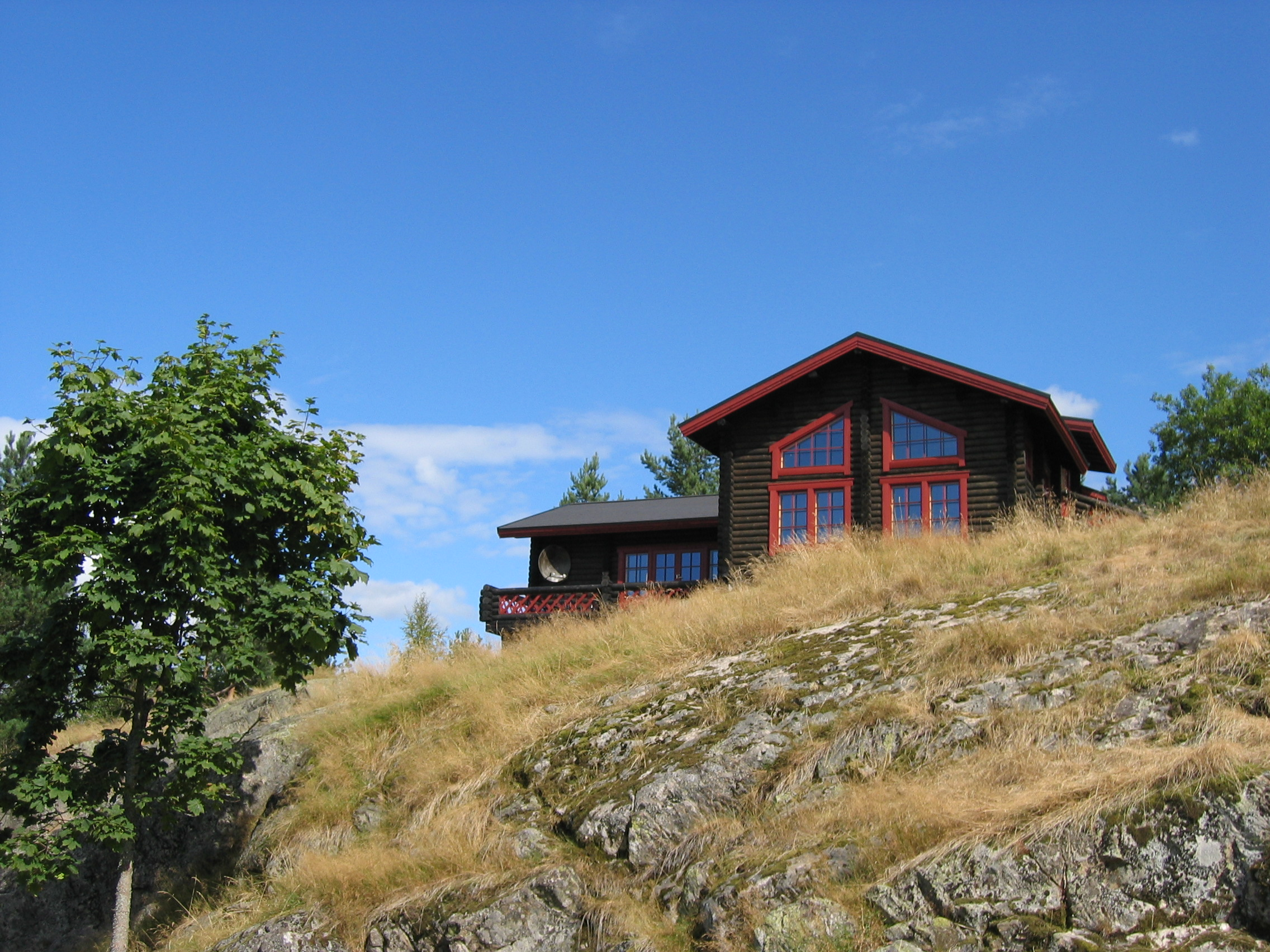
Farm area in Færsnes

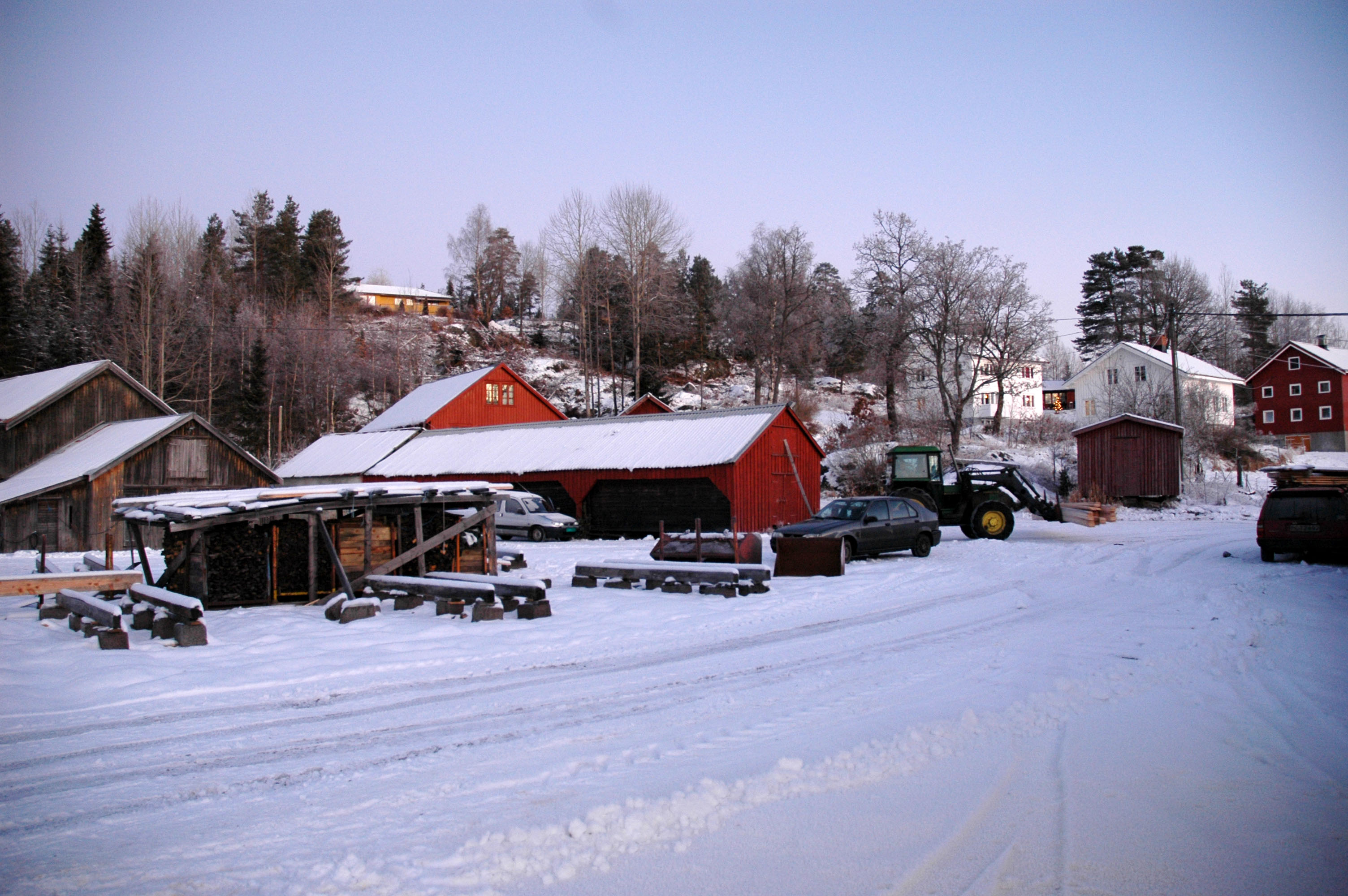
Haukenes area

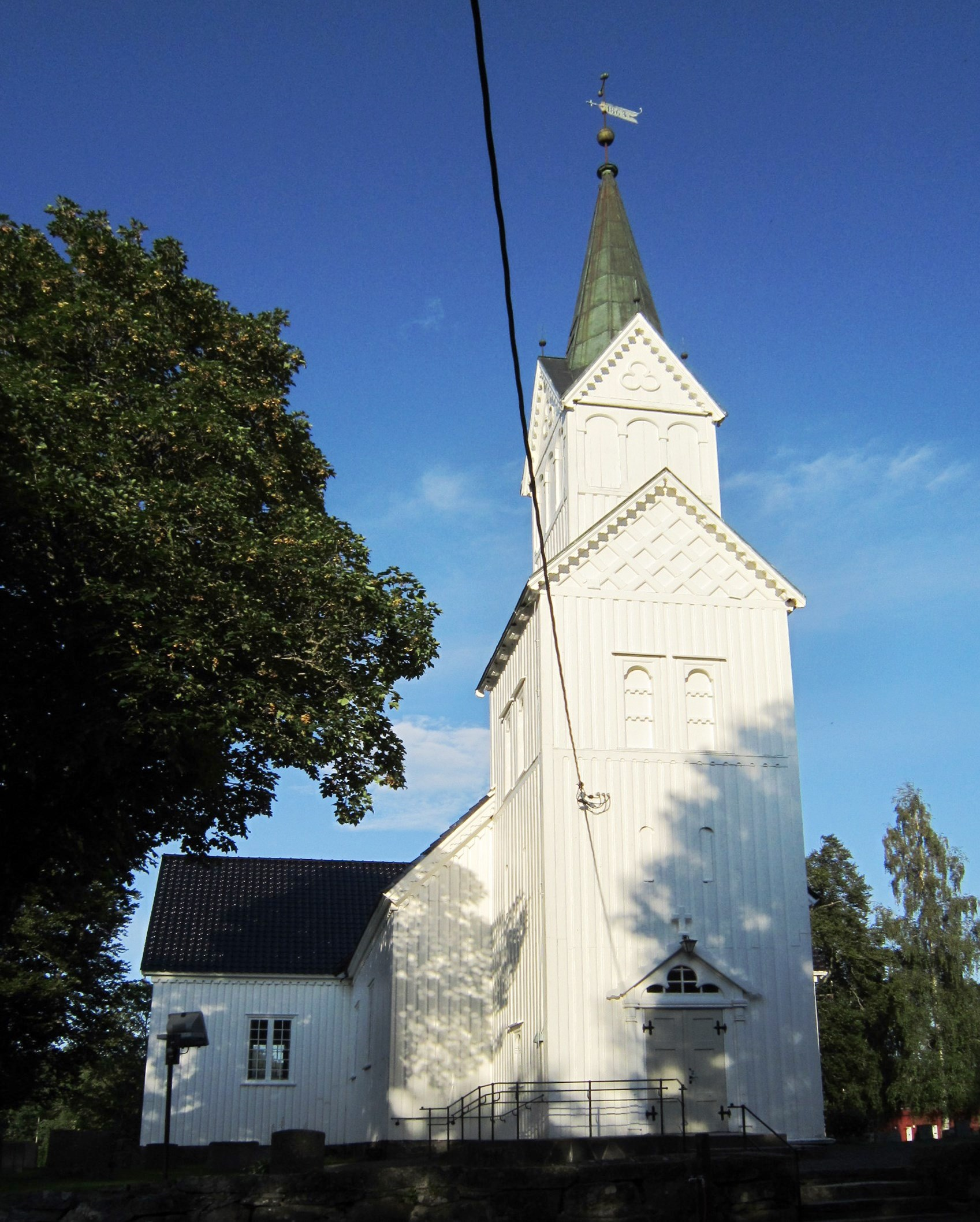
Vegårshei Church

=== Administrative history ===
The parish of Vegaardsheien (later spelled "Vegårshei") was established as a municipality on 1 January 1838 (see formannskapsdistrikt law). The borders of the municipality have not changed since that time (which is pretty rare among municipalities in Norway).

In 2020, there were many municipal and county mergers across Norway due to the work of the Solberg cabinet. Historically, this municipality was part of the old Aust-Agder county. On 1 January 2020, the municipality became a part of the newly-formed Agder county (after Aust-Agder and Vest-Agder counties were merged).

=== Name ===
The municipality (originally the parish) is named after the old name for the area (Old Norse: Vigisheiðr) since the first Vegårshei Church was built there. The first element is the genitive case of the name of the lake Vegår. The meaning of the lake name is uncertain. One theory is that it comes from the word vé which means "pagan sanctuary". Another theory is that it comes from the verb vígja which means "to consecrate" or "to dedicate". The last element is heiðr which means "heath" or "moor". Historically, the name was spelled as Wegaardsheien or Vegaardsheien, and sometimes it was abbreviated as simply Heien.

On 3 November 1917, a royal resolution changed the spelling of the name of the municipality to Vegaarshei. On 21 December 1917, a royal resolution enacted the 1917 Norwegian language reforms. Prior to this change, the name was spelled Vegaarshei with the digraph "aa", and after this reform, the name was spelled Vegårshei, using the letter å instead.

=== Coat of arms ===
The coat of arms was granted on 30 April 1987. The official blazon is "Gules, a fox sejant argent" (Norwegian: I rødt en sittende sølv rev). This means the arms have a red field (background) and the charge is a fox. The fox has a tincture of argent which means it is commonly colored white, but if it is made out of metal, then silver is used. The fox was chosen as a representative of the local wildlife and also for the fox farming in the municipality. The arms were designed by Daniel Rike. The municipal flag has the same design as the coat of arms.

=== Churches ===
The Church of Norway has one parish (sokn) within Vegårshei Municipality. It is part of the Aust-Nedenes prosti (deanery) in the Diocese of Agder og Telemark.

Churches in Vegårshei Municipality
Parish (sokn)	Church name	Location of the church	Year built
Vegårshei	Vegårshei Church	Myra	1808

== Geography ==
Vegårshei Municipality is bordered on the north by Nissedal Municipality (in Telemark county) and Gjerstad Municipality, on the east by Risør Municipality, on the south by Tvedestrand Municipality, and on the west by Åmli Municipality. The lake Vegår dominates the northern part of the hilly and forested municipality. The highest point in the municipality is the 525.07-metre (1,722.7 ft) tall mountain Hovdefjell, located very close to the border with Froland Municipality.

== Government ==
Vegårshei Municipality is responsible for primary education (through 10th grade), outpatient health services, senior citizen services, welfare and other social services, zoning, economic development, and municipal roads and utilities. The municipality is governed by a municipal council of directly elected representatives. The mayor is indirectly elected by a vote of the municipal council. The municipality is under the jurisdiction of the Agder District Court and the Agder Court of Appeal.

=== Municipal council ===
The municipal council (Kommunestyre) of Vegårshei Municipality is made up of 17 representatives that are elected to four-year terms. The tables below show the current and historical composition of the council by political party.

Vegårshei kommunestyre 2023–2027
Party name (in Norwegian)	Number of representatives
Labour Party (Arbeiderpartiet)	5
Conservative Party (Høyre)	2
Christian Democratic Party (Kristelig Folkeparti)	6
Centre Party (Senterpartiet)	4
Total number of members:	17

Vegårshei kommunestyre 2019–2023
Party name (in Norwegian)	Number of representatives
Labour Party (Arbeiderpartiet)	4
Conservative Party (Høyre)	2
Christian Democratic Party (Kristelig Folkeparti)	7
Centre Party (Senterpartiet)	4
Total number of members:	17

Vegårshei kommunestyre 2015–2019
Party name (in Norwegian)	Number of representatives
Labour Party (Arbeiderpartiet)	6
Progress Party (Fremskrittspartiet)	1
Conservative Party (Høyre)	3
Christian Democratic Party (Kristelig Folkeparti)	6
Centre Party (Senterpartiet)	5
Total number of members:	21

Vegårshei kommunestyre 2011–2015
Party name (in Norwegian)	Number of representatives
Labour Party (Arbeiderpartiet)	6
Progress Party (Fremskrittspartiet)	1
Conservative Party (Høyre)	5
Christian Democratic Party (Kristelig Folkeparti)	5
Centre Party (Senterpartiet)	4
Total number of members:	21

Vegårshei kommunestyre 2007–2011
Party name (in Norwegian)	Number of representatives
Labour Party (Arbeiderpartiet)	9
Progress Party (Fremskrittspartiet)	3
Conservative Party (Høyre)	3
Christian Democratic Party (Kristelig Folkeparti)	4
Centre Party (Senterpartiet)	2
Total number of members:	21

Vegårshei kommunestyre 2003–2007
Party name (in Norwegian)	Number of representatives
Labour Party (Arbeiderpartiet)	7
Progress Party (Fremskrittspartiet)	2
Conservative Party (Høyre)	6
Christian Democratic Party (Kristelig Folkeparti)	4
Centre Party (Senterpartiet)	2
Total number of members:	21

Vegårshei kommunestyre 1999–2003
Party name (in Norwegian)	Number of representatives
Labour Party (Arbeiderpartiet)	7
Progress Party (Fremskrittspartiet)	1
Conservative Party (Høyre)	6
Christian Democratic Party (Kristelig Folkeparti)	5
Centre Party (Senterpartiet)	2
Total number of members:	21

Vegårshei kommunestyre 1995–1999
Party name (in Norwegian)	Number of representatives
Labour Party (Arbeiderpartiet)	6
Progress Party (Fremskrittspartiet)	1
Conservative Party (Høyre)	7
Christian Democratic Party (Kristelig Folkeparti)	4
Centre Party (Senterpartiet)	3
Total number of members:	21

Vegårshei kommunestyre 1991–1995
Party name (in Norwegian)	Number of representatives
Labour Party (Arbeiderpartiet)	7
Progress Party (Fremskrittspartiet)	1
Conservative Party (Høyre)	2
Christian Democratic Party (Kristelig Folkeparti)	4
Centre Party (Senterpartiet)	3
Total number of members:	17

Vegårshei kommunestyre 1987–1991
Party name (in Norwegian)	Number of representatives
Labour Party (Arbeiderpartiet)	8
Progress Party (Fremskrittspartiet)	1
Conservative Party (Høyre)	2
Christian Democratic Party (Kristelig Folkeparti)	4
Centre Party (Senterpartiet)	2
Total number of members:	17

Vegårshei kommunestyre 1983–1987
Party name (in Norwegian)	Number of representatives
Labour Party (Arbeiderpartiet)	8
Progress Party (Fremskrittspartiet)	1
Conservative Party (Høyre)	3
Christian Democratic Party (Kristelig Folkeparti)	3
Centre Party (Senterpartiet)	2
Total number of members:	17

Vegårshei kommunestyre 1979–1983
Party name (in Norwegian)	Number of representatives
Labour Party (Arbeiderpartiet)	7
Christian Democratic Party (Kristelig Folkeparti)	4
Joint list of the Conservative Party (Høyre), Centre Party (Senterpartiet), Liberal Party (Venstre), and New People's Party (Nye Folkepartiet)	6
Total number of members:	17

Vegårshei kommunestyre 1975–1979
Party name (in Norwegian)	Number of representatives
Labour Party (Arbeiderpartiet)	7
Christian Democratic Party (Kristelig Folkeparti)	3
Joint list of the Conservative Party (Høyre), Centre Party (Senterpartiet), Liberal Party (Venstre), and New People's Party (Nye Folkepartiet)	7
Total number of members:	17

Vegårshei kommunestyre 1971–1975
Party name (in Norwegian)	Number of representatives
Labour Party (Arbeiderpartiet)	8
Christian Democratic Party (Kristelig Folkeparti)	2
Joint List(s) of Non-Socialist Parties (Borgerlige Felleslister)	7
Total number of members:	17

Vegårshei kommunestyre 1967–1971
Party name (in Norwegian)	Number of representatives
Labour Party (Arbeiderpartiet)	8
Christian Democratic Party (Kristelig Folkeparti)	2
Joint List(s) of Non-Socialist Parties (Borgerlige Felleslister)	7
Total number of members:	17

Vegårshei kommunestyre 1963–1967
Party name (in Norwegian)	Number of representatives
Labour Party (Arbeiderpartiet)	9
Christian Democratic Party (Kristelig Folkeparti)	1
Joint List(s) of Non-Socialist Parties (Borgerlige Felleslister)	7
Total number of members:	17

Vegårshei herredsstyre 1959–1963
Party name (in Norwegian)	Number of representatives
Labour Party (Arbeiderpartiet)	9
Christian Democratic Party (Kristelig Folkeparti)	2
Joint List(s) of Non-Socialist Parties (Borgerlige Felleslister)	6
Total number of members:	17

Vegårshei herredsstyre 1955–1959
Party name (in Norwegian)	Number of representatives
Labour Party (Arbeiderpartiet)	9
Joint List(s) of Non-Socialist Parties (Borgerlige Felleslister)	8
Total number of members:	17

Vegårshei herredsstyre 1951–1955
Party name (in Norwegian)	Number of representatives
Labour Party (Arbeiderpartiet)	9
Joint List(s) of Non-Socialist Parties (Borgerlige Felleslister)	7
Total number of members:	16

Vegårshei herredsstyre 1947–1951
Party name (in Norwegian)	Number of representatives
Labour Party (Arbeiderpartiet)	9
Christian Democratic Party (Kristelig Folkeparti)	2
Local List(s) (Lokale lister)	5
Total number of members:	16

Vegårshei herredsstyre 1945–1947
Party name (in Norwegian)	Number of representatives
Labour Party (Arbeiderpartiet)	9
Christian Democratic Party (Kristelig Folkeparti)	3
Local List(s) (Lokale lister)	4
Total number of members:	16

Vegårshei herredsstyre 1937–1941*
Party name (in Norwegian)	Number of representatives
Labour Party (Arbeiderpartiet)	7
Joint list of the Liberal Party (Venstre) and the Radical People's Party (Radikale Folkepartiet)	5
Joint List(s) of Non-Socialist Parties (Borgerlige Felleslister)	4
Total number of members:	16
Note: Due to the German occupation of Norway during World War II, no elections were held for new municipal councils until after the war ended in 1945.

=== Mayors ===
The mayor (Norwegian: ordfører) of Vegårshei Municipality is the political leader of the municipality and the chairperson of the municipal council. The following people have held this position:

- 1838–1839: Ole Olsen Vormvik
- 1840–1841: Tjøstel Grundesen Espeland
- 1842–1843: Halvor Olsen Moland
- 1844–1845: Ole Olsen Vormvik
- 1846–1847: Ole Knutsen Leiulvstad
- 1848–1849: Gunnar Knutsen Kvifte
- 1849–1853: Jens Andersen Myre
- 1853–1855: Eilev Torjussen Vieli
- 1856–1859: Tjøstel Pedersen Aas
- 1859–1863: Tallak Larsen Lauvnes
- 1864–1865: Tallak Knutsen Moland
- 1866–1867: Tjøstel Pedersen Aas
- 1868–1869: Stian Nilsen Nærestad
- 1869–1873: Tallak Larsen Lauvnes
- 1874–1877: Ole K. Vormvik
- 1877–1881: Nils Gunnarsen Grasaasen
- 1882–1889: Knut Tjøstelsen Aas
- 1890–1897: Gr. Simonstad
- 1898–1901: Knut Tjøstelsen Aas
- 1902–1904: Ole K. Leiulvstad
- 1905–1907: Knut Tjøstelsen Aas
- 1907–1919: Torjus Værland (V)
- 1920–1922: Ole O. Vaaje
- 1923–1925: Lars T. Espeland (V)
- 1926–1928: Anders Holen
- 1929–1931: Lars T. Espeland (V)
- 1932–1934: Anders Holen
- 1935–1936: Haakon Sommerset
- 1936–1937: Tjøstolv Peder Colbjørnsen
- 1937–1940: Lars T. Espeland (V)
- 1941–1945: Knut Værland (NS)
- 1945–1945: Lars T. Espeland (V)
- 1946–1955: Knut Lauve (Ap)
- 1955–1959: Knut Adolf Moland (Ap)
- 1959–1967: Olaf Moland (Ap)
- 1967–1979: Paul Reine (V)
- 1979–1987: Torjus Vierli (H)
- 1987–1995: Tjøstolv Peder Colbjørnsen (KrF)
- 1995–1999: Kjell Wedø (H)
- 1999–2003: Tjøstolv Peder Colbjørnsen (KrF)
- 2003–2011: Maya Twedt Berli (Ap)
- 2011–2015: Kjetil Torp (KrF)
- 2015–2019: Kirsten Helen Myren (Sp)
- 2019–present: Kjetil Torp (KrF)

== Economy ==
As of 2019, public administration and the service sector, are most important in regard to employment; the retail industry and entities that have hotel services and those that serve food and beverages, constitute 11% of employment; agriculture and forestry accounts for 9% of employment; manufacturing accounts for 7% of employment—21% including those employed in construction and those employed in the energy sector and public utilities. Of the inhabitants that are employed, 55% have employment outside the municipal borders.

It is well-suited for hunting and fishing for residents and tourists alike.

== Transportation ==
The Sørlandsbanen railway line runs through the municipality, stopping at Vegårshei Station, just north of the village of Myra. There are several Norwegian county roads that cross the municipality, connecting it to its neighbors. Some of the roads include Norwegian County Road 414, Norwegian County Road 415, Norwegian County Road 416, and Norwegian County Road 417.

== Notable people ==
- Lars Vegard (1880 in Vegårshei – 1963), a physicist and researcher of the aurora borealis
- Ole Colbjørnsen (1897in Vegårshei – 1973), a journalist, economist, and politician
- Tjostolv Moland (1981 in Vegårshei – 2013 in Kinshasa), a former Norwegian army officer and security contractor
