= Norwegian County Road 415 =

Road in Agder, Norway

County Road 415
- Bokmål: Fylkesvei 415; Nynorsk: Fylkesveg 415

Route information
- Maintained by Norwegian Public Roads Administration
- Length: 37.3 km (23.2 mi)

Major junctions
- Northwest end: Rv41 Myråsen, Åmli Municipality
- Fv412 Hovde, Åmli Municipality; Fv414 Uberg, Vegårshei Municipality
- Southeast end: E18 Fiane, Tvedestrand Municipality

Location
- Country: Norway

Highway system
- Roads in Norway; National Roads; County Roads
← Fv414	→ Fv416

Norwegian county road 415 (Fv415) is a Norwegian county road in Agder county, Norway. The 37.3-kilometre (23.2 mi) long highway runs between the European route E18 highway at Fiane in Tvedestrand Municipality and the Norwegian National Road 41 at Myråsen, just south of the village of Åmli in Åmli Municipality. The Norwegian County Road 412 splits off from this road to connect to Nelaug and the Nelaug Station. The Norwegian County Road 414 connects to this road at Ubergsmoen and heads north into Vegårshei Municipality.
