= Nelaug =

Village in Åmli Municipality, Norway

- Village
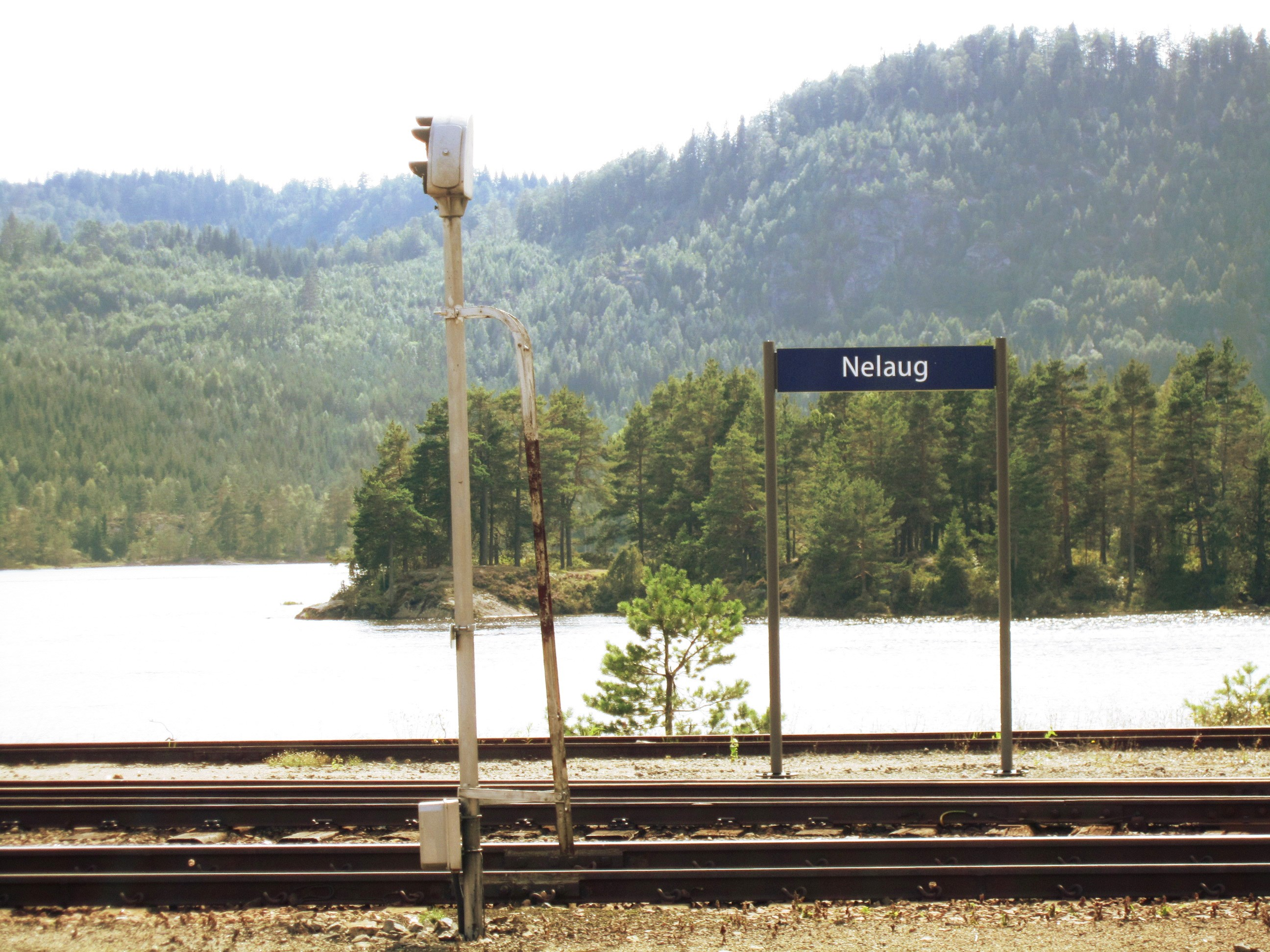
- View from the railway station looking out on the lake
- Interactive map of Nelaug
- Coordinates: 58.6565°N 08.6333°E
- Country: Norway
- Region: Southern Norway
- County: Agder
- District: Østre Agder
- Municipality: Åmli Municipality
- Elevation: 140 m (460 ft)
- Time zone: UTC+01:00 (CET)
  - Summer (DST): UTC+02:00 (CEST)
- Post Code: 4863 Nelaug

Nelaug is a village in the southern part of Åmli Municipality in Agder county, Norway. The population (2001) was 161. The village lies at east of the Nelaug lake, which is regulated by a hydroelectric power plant. The most notable feature in the village is the train station, Nelaug Station, which is the junction between the main Sørland Line and the branch Arendal Line. Nelaug school is a 1st through 6th grade elementary school. It is one of the three schools in Åmli Municipality. Nelaug sits at the end of Norwegian County Road 412 which connects Nelaug to the Norwegian County Road 415 and the rest of Norway.

== Name ==
The Old Norse form of the name must have been Niðlaug. The first element Nið is the old name of the river Nidelva and the last element is laug which means "lake".

== Climate ==
Climate data for Nelaug 1991-2020 (142 m)
Month	Jan	Feb	Mar	Apr	May	Jun	Jul	Aug	Sep	Oct	Nov	Dec	Year
Mean daily maximum °C (°F)	1.5 (34.7)	2.2 (36.0)	5.6 (42.1)	10.8 (51.4)	16.3 (61.3)	20 (68)	22.2 (72.0)	20.9 (69.6)	16.1 (61.0)	10.3 (50.5)	5.4 (41.7)	2.1 (35.8)	11.1 (52.0)
Daily mean °C (°F)	−1.6 (29.1)	−1.5 (29.3)	1.2 (34.2)	5.5 (41.9)	10.6 (51.1)	14.5 (58.1)	16.7 (62.1)	15.7 (60.3)	11.7 (53.1)	6.7 (44.1)	2.6 (36.7)	−0.9 (30.4)	6.8 (44.2)
Mean daily minimum °C (°F)	−4.5 (23.9)	−4.6 (23.7)	−2.8 (27.0)	0.8 (33.4)	5.1 (41.2)	9.3 (48.7)	11.7 (53.1)	11.2 (52.2)	8.1 (46.6)	3.7 (38.7)	0.1 (32.2)	−3.7 (25.3)	2.9 (37.2)
Average precipitation mm (inches)	148 (5.8)	92 (3.6)	83 (3.3)	68 (2.7)	83 (3.3)	92 (3.6)	95 (3.7)	134 (5.3)	136 (5.4)	161 (6.3)	164 (6.5)	138 (5.4)	1,394 (54.9)
Average precipitation days (≥ 1.0 mm)	14	11	10	9	10	10	10	11	11	13	14	14	137
Source 1: Yr.no Nelaug statistics
Source 2: Noaa WMO averages 91-2020 Norway
