= Myra, Norway =

Village in Vegårshei Municipality, Norway

Myra
- Village
- Interactive map of Myra
- Coordinates: 58.7492°N 08.8625°E
- Country: Norway
- Region: Southern Norway
- County: Agder
- District: Østre Agder
- Municipality: Vegårshei Municipality

Area
  - Total: 1.14 km^{2} (0.44 sq mi)
- Elevation: 174 m (571 ft)

Population (2025)
  - Total: 978
  - Density: 858/km^{2} (2,220/sq mi)
- Time zone: UTC+01:00 (CET)
  - Summer (DST): UTC+02:00 (CEST)
- Post Code: 4985 Vegårshei

Myra is the administrative centre of Vegårshei Municipality in Agder, Norway. The village is located along the river Storelva, which flows out of the large lake Vegår, just to the north. The 1.14-square-kilometre (280-acre) village has a population (2025) of 978 and a population density of 858 inhabitants per square kilometre (2,220/sq mi).

Myra sits at the junction of the Norwegian County Road 414 and Norwegian County Road 416. The Sørlandsbanen railway line stops just north of Myra at Vegårshei Station. As the administrative centre of Vegårshei, the government offices are located here along with a school and Vegårshei Church.
