= Vegårshei Station =

Railway station in Vegårshei, Norway

Vegårshei
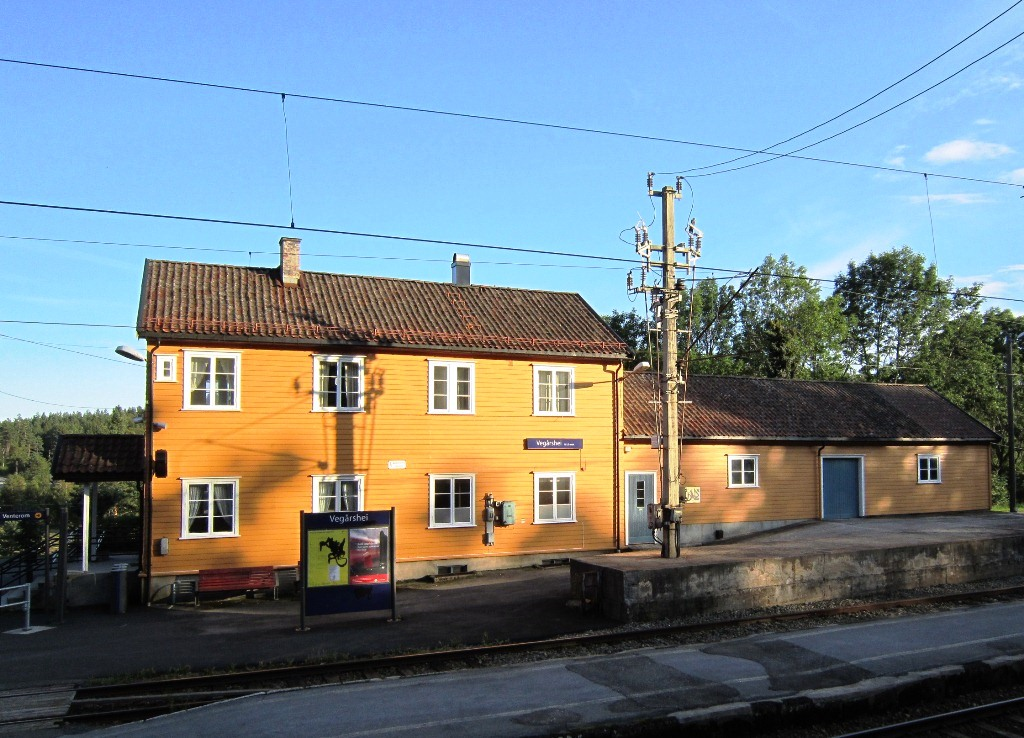

General information
- Location: Myra, Vegårshei Municipality; Norway
- Coordinates: 58°45′39″N 08°51′19″E
- Elevation: 183 m (600 ft)
- System: Railway station
- Owner: Bane NOR
- Operator: Go-Ahead Norge
- Line: Sørlandsbanen
- Distance: 261.51 km (162.49 mi)
- Platforms: 2
- Connections: Bus: Tvedestrand, Risør

Construction
- Parking: 30

Other information
- Station code: VGH

History
- Opened: 10 November 1935
Location

Vegårshei Station (Norwegian: Vegårshei stasjon) is a railway station located in the village of Myra in Vegårshei Municipality in Agder county, Norway. The station is located along the Sørlandet Line and it is served by express trains to Kristiansand and Oslo. The station is owned and operated by Bane NOR.

== History ==
The station was opened on 10 November 1935 when the Sørlandet Line was extended from Neslandsvatn Station to Arendal Station.

Preceding station	Express trains	Following station
Nelaug towards Stavanger	F5	Gjerstad towards Oslo S
