= Narestø =

Village in Arendal Municipality, Norway

- Village
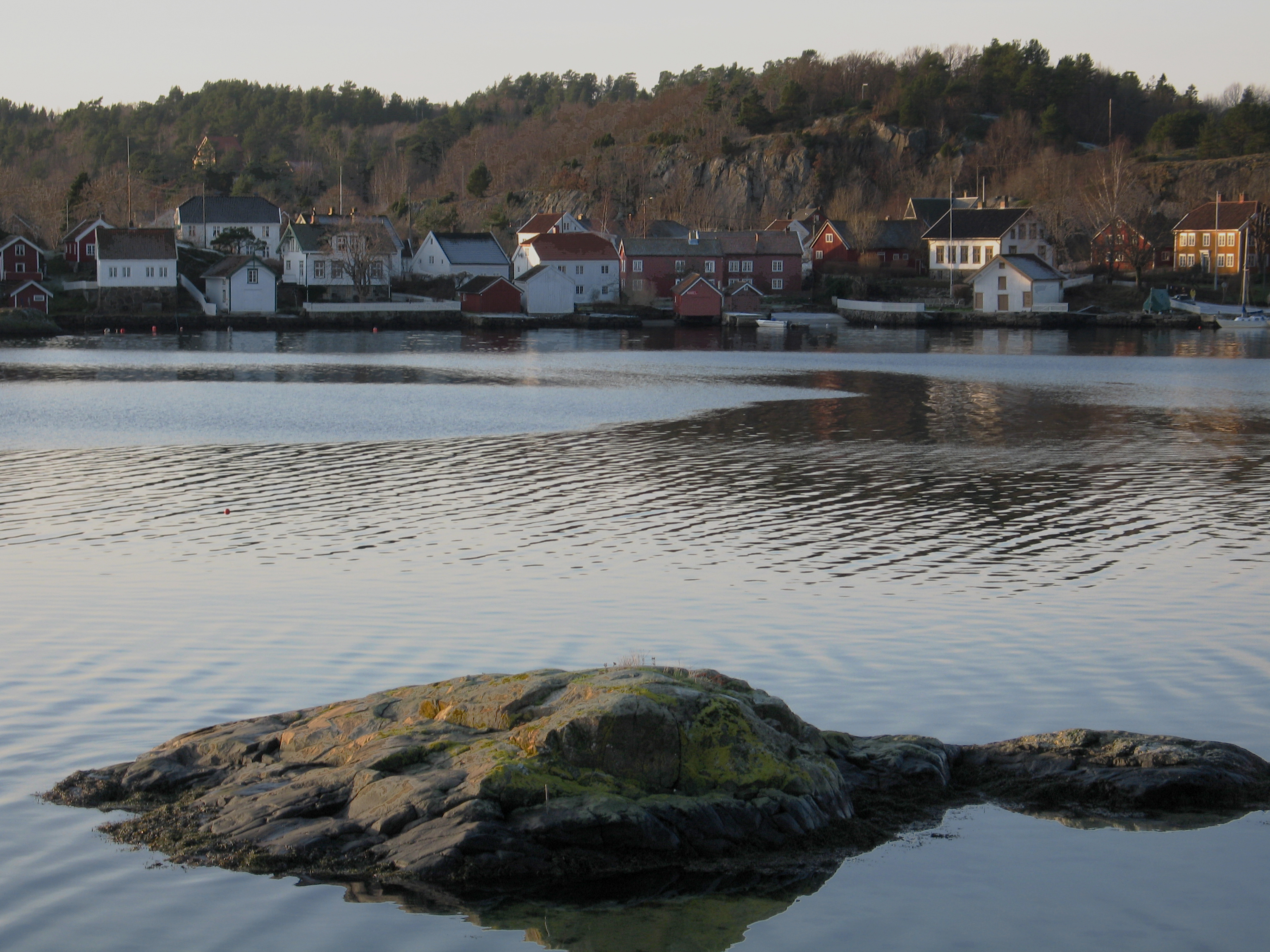
- View of the village
- Interactive map of Narestø
- Coordinates: 58.5246°N 08.9337°E
- Country: Norway
- Region: Southern Norway
- County: Agder
- District: Østre Agder
- Municipality: Arendal Municipality
- Elevation: 4 m (13 ft)
- Time zone: UTC+01:00 (CET)
  - Summer (DST): UTC+02:00 (CEST)
- Post Code: 4810 Eydehavn

Narestø is a village in Arendal Municipality in Agder county, Norway. The village is located on the southern shore of the island of Flosterøya, just south of the historic Flosta Church. The village of Kalvøysund lies about 3 kilometres (1.9 mi) to the northeast.
