= Vegårshei Church =

Church in Agder, Norway

- Vegårshei kirke
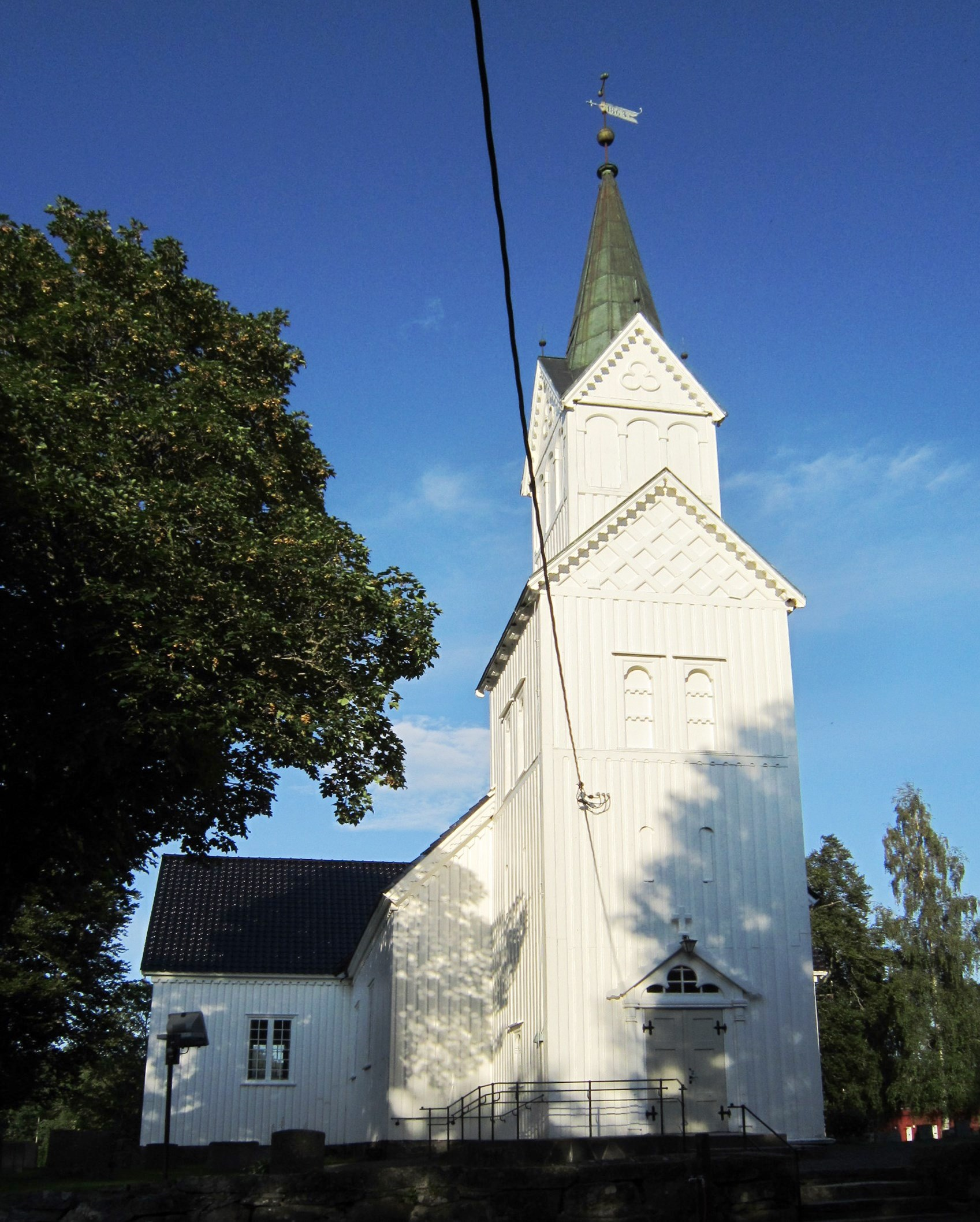
- View of the church
- Vegårshei Church
- 58.7583°N 08.8588°E
- Location: Vegårshei Municipality, Agder
- Country: Norway
- Denomination: Church of Norway
- Previous denomination: Catholic Church
- Churchmanship: Evangelical Lutheran

History
- Former name: Wegaardsheiene kirke
- Status: Parish church
- Founded: 13th century
- Consecrated: 19 Aug 1810

Architecture
- Functional status: Active
- Architect: Knud Torkildsen Skjerkhol
- Architectural type: Cruciform
- Style: Louis XVI style
- Completed: 1808 (218 years ago)

Specifications
- Capacity: 350
- Materials: Wood

Administration
- Diocese: Agder og Telemark
- Deanery: Aust-Nedenes prosti
- Parish: Vegårshei
- Norwegian Cultural Heritage Site
- Type: Church
- Status: Automatically protected
- ID: 85792

Vegårshei Church (Norwegian: Vegårshei kirke, locally: Vegårshei kjørke) is a parish church of the Church of Norway in Vegårshei Municipality in Agder county, Norway. It is located in the village of Myra. It is the church for the Vegårshei parish which is part of the Aust-Nedenes prosti (deanery) in the Diocese of Agder og Telemark. The white, wooden church was built in a cruciform design in 1808 using plans drawn up by the architect Knud Torkildsen Skjerkholt. The church seats about 350 people.

== History ==
The earliest existing historical records of the church date back to the year 1347, but it may have been built in the 1200s. The first church on this site was a stave church and it was an annex to the main prestegjeld of Gjerstad. In 1630, the church was expanded, but only 37 years later, in 1667, the church was torn down and a new church was built on the same site. The peasants in the parish purchased the church from the King in 1723 and during the next 40–50 years they made many improvements to the building. Despite this, by the early 1800s, the church was in poor shape. A new church was commissioned to replace it and Knud Skjerkholt was hired to lead the construction. The old church was torn down in 1808 and a new church was built on the same site. The church was not consecrated until 19 August 1810 when the local Dean Krogh from Arendal came to the church.

The tower originally stood in the centre of the cross-shaped roof, but in 1863 the cross was moved to the top of the western cross-arm over the main entrance to the building. A major interior renovation happened in 1902 where the floors and benches were replaced and paneling covered the interior walls. The changes were considered quite drastic and after about 30 years, they were all undone and the interior was restored to the original look.

== See also ==
- List of churches in Agder og Telemark
