= Flosta Church =

Church in Agder, Norway

- Flosta kirke
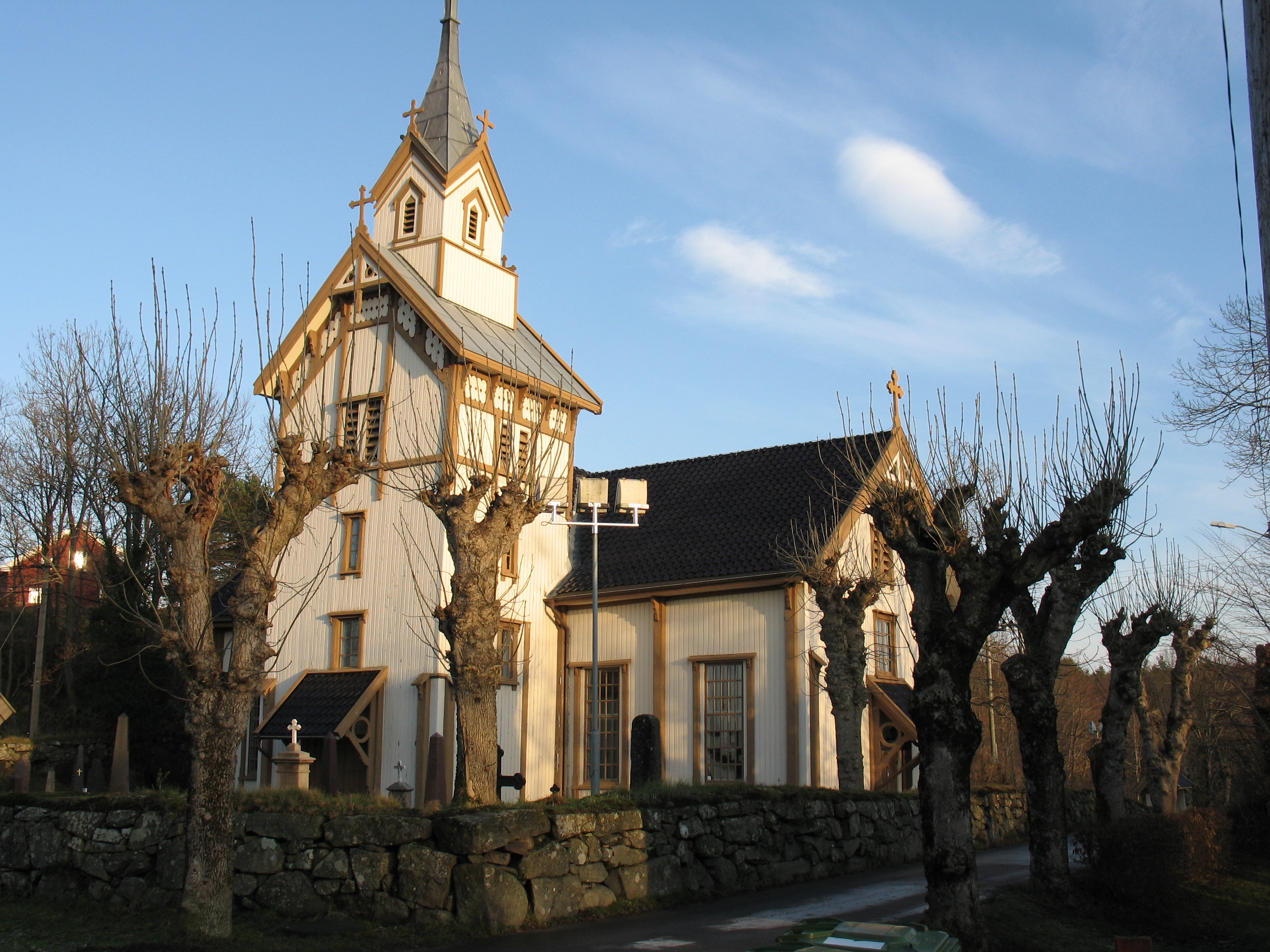
- View of the church
- Flosta Church
- 58.52858°N 08.93405°E
- Location: Arendal Municipality, Agder
- Country: Norway
- Denomination: Church of Norway
- Previous denomination: Catholic Church
- Churchmanship: Evangelical Lutheran

History
- Status: Parish church
- Founded: c. 1300

Architecture
- Functional status: Active
- Architectural type: Cruciform
- Completed: c. 1632 (394 years ago)

Specifications
- Capacity: 290
- Materials: Wood

Administration
- Diocese: Agder og Telemark
- Deanery: Arendal prosti
- Parish: Moland
- Norwegian Cultural Heritage Site
- Type: Church
- Status: Automatically protected
- ID: 84165

Flosta Church (Norwegian: Flosta kirke) is a parish church of the Church of Norway in Arendal Municipality in Agder county, Norway. It is located just north of the village of Narestø on the island of Flostaøyawooden church was built in a long church design in 1632 using plans drawn up by an unknown architect (it was later converted to a cruciform design). The church seats about 290 people.

== History ==
The earliest existing historical records of the church date back to the year 1467, but the church was not new that year. The old church was possibly built around the year 1300. Not much is known about the old church, but in 1628, the church was described as old and dilapidated. In 1632, the church was torn down and replaced with a new building on the same site.

Around 1700, the church was expanded and got a new choir on the east side of the building. In 1735-1736 a bell tower was added on the west end of the building. In 1739, there was a small fire in the church, but there was little damage. In 1747, the church was expanded by adding two wings on the north and south sides to create a cruciform design. The builder Ole Nielsen Weierholt led this work.

In 1814, this church served as an election church (Norwegian: valgkirke). Together with more than 300 other parish churches across Norway, it was a polling station for elections to the 1814 Norwegian Constituent Assembly which wrote the Constitution of Norway. This was Norway's first national election. Each church parish was a constituency that elected people called "electors" who later met together in each county to elect the representatives for the assembly that was to meet at Eidsvoll Manor later that year.

There was another small fire in the building in 1824. In 1864, the church was enlarged again with Anders Thorbjørnsen as builder. The roof was raised higher and the building was extended to the east. The choir was moved into the new addition on the east end. During this renovation, the church was given a neo-Gothic design.

In 1976, the church was restored and renovated with consultation by National Heritage Board and the interior was brought back to its 1747 look. The choir was moved to the north end of the church and the east end (where the choir used to be) was turned into a church hall. There were small fires in the church 1980 and again in 1988, but neither caused major damage.

== Media gallery ==
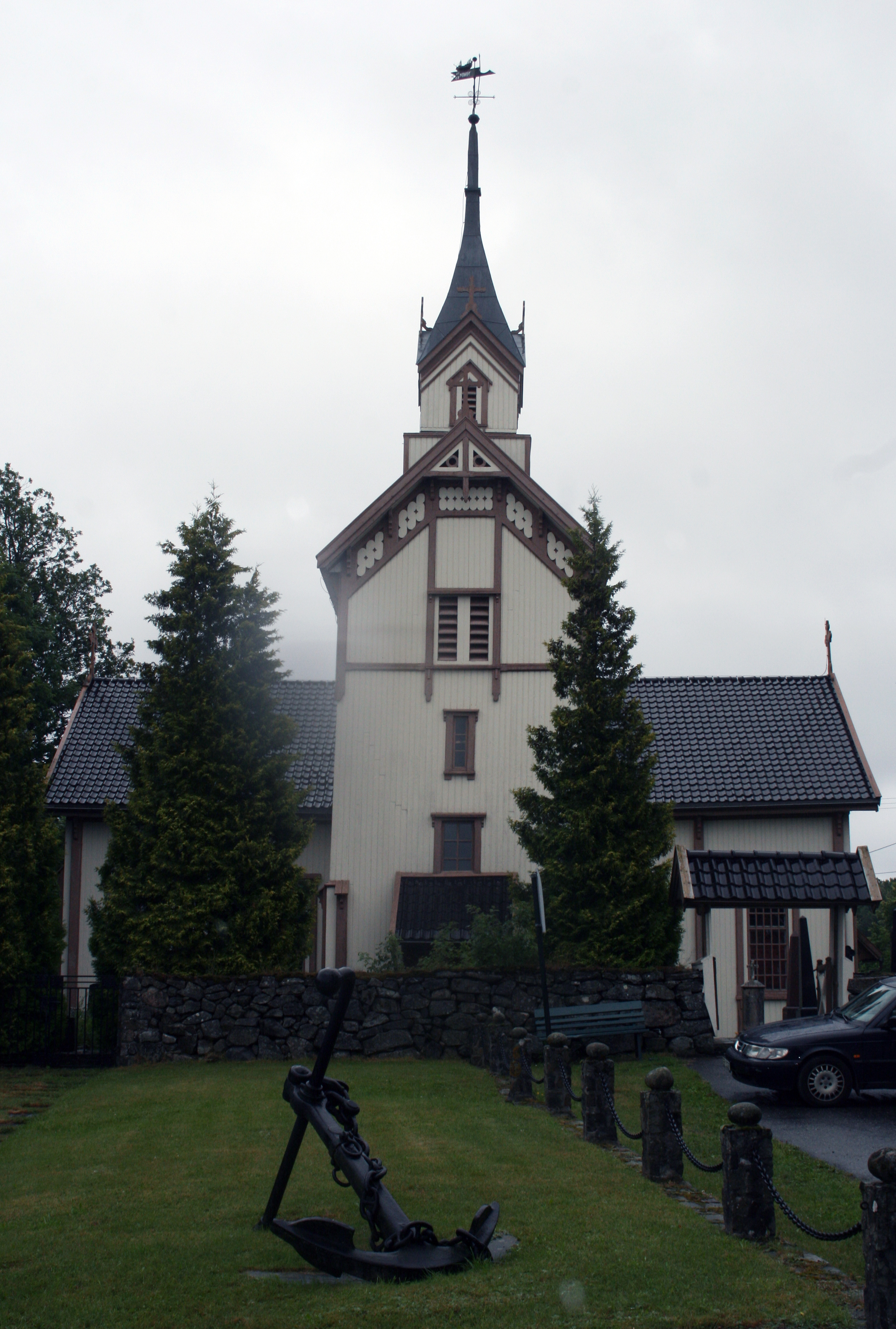

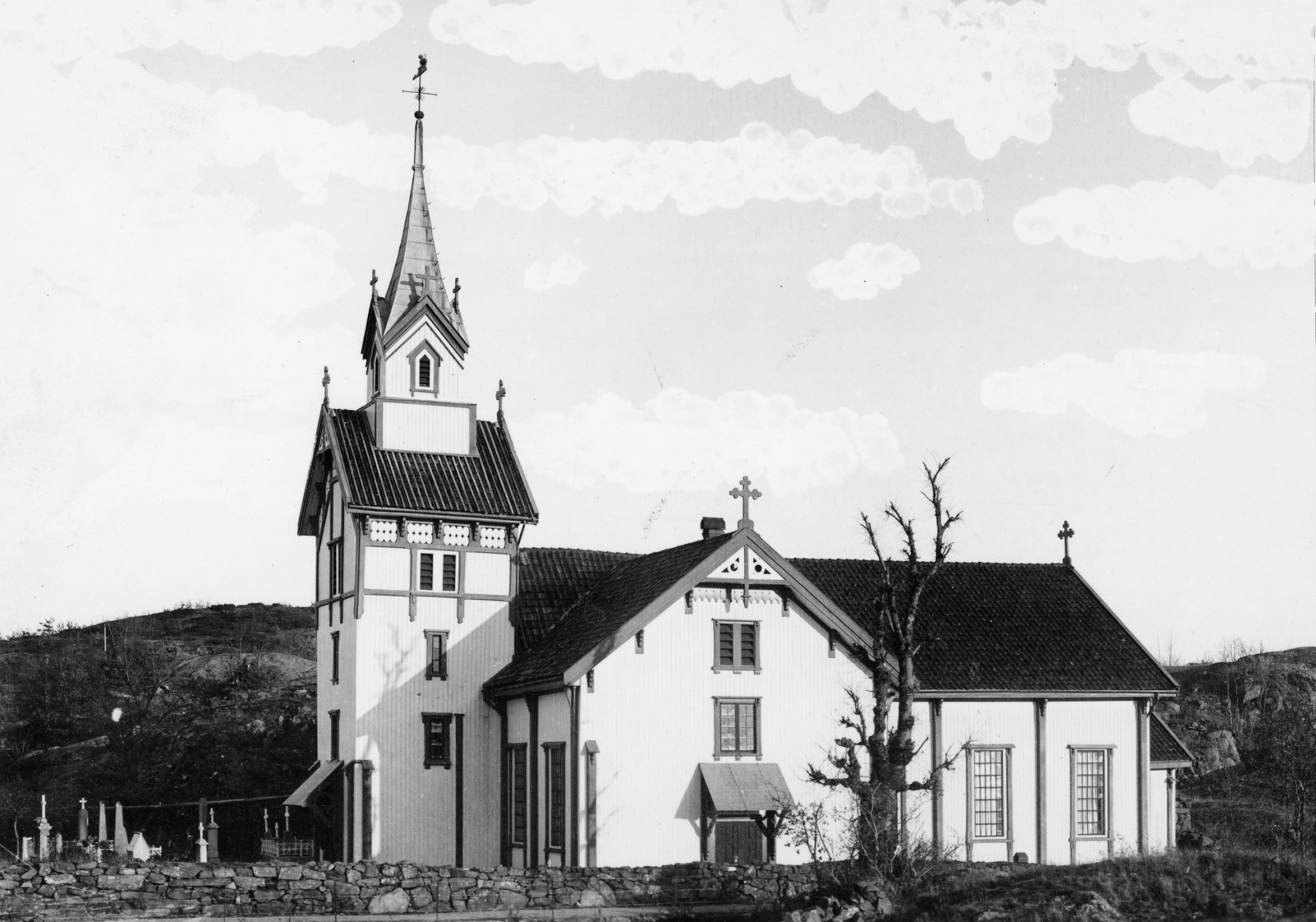

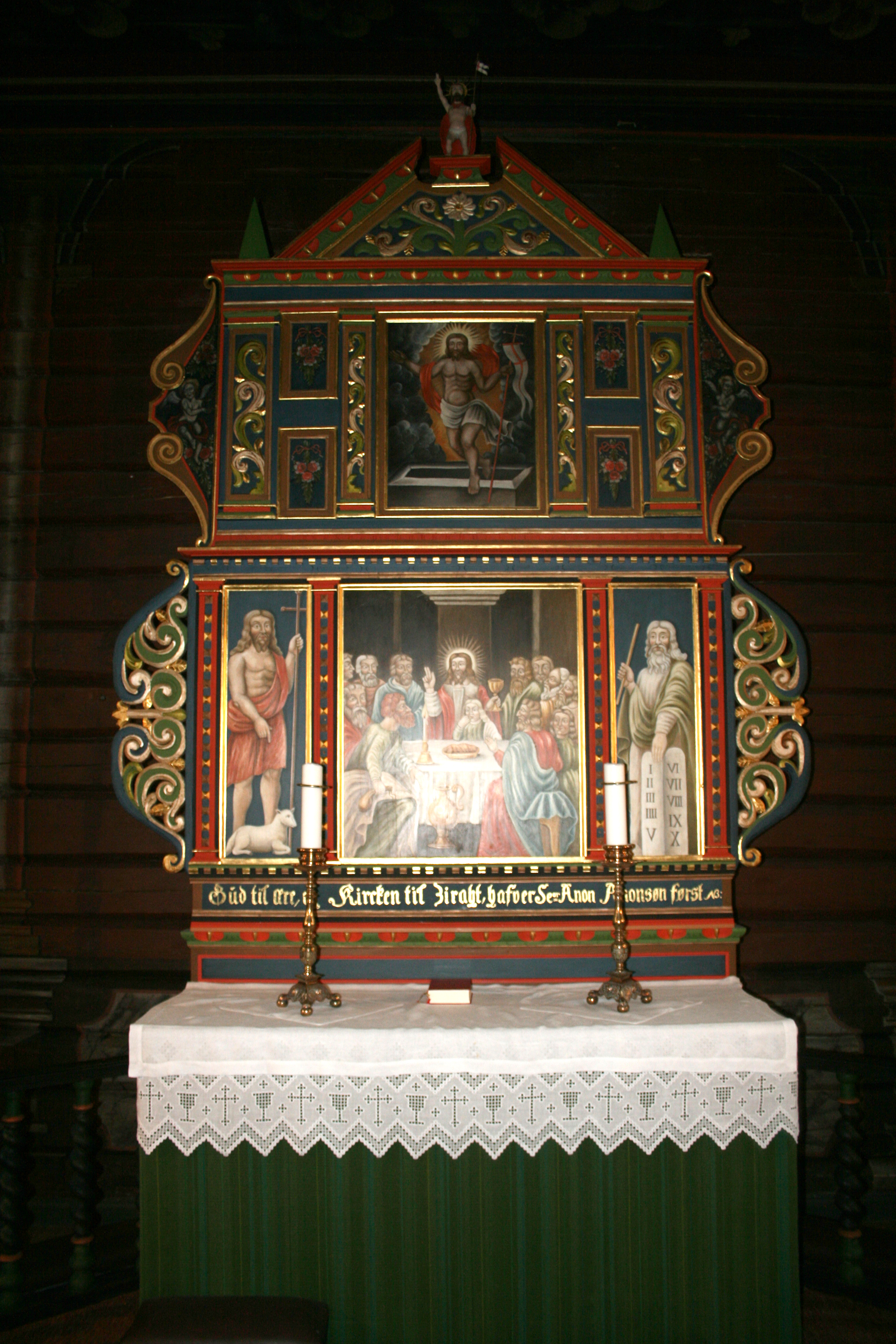

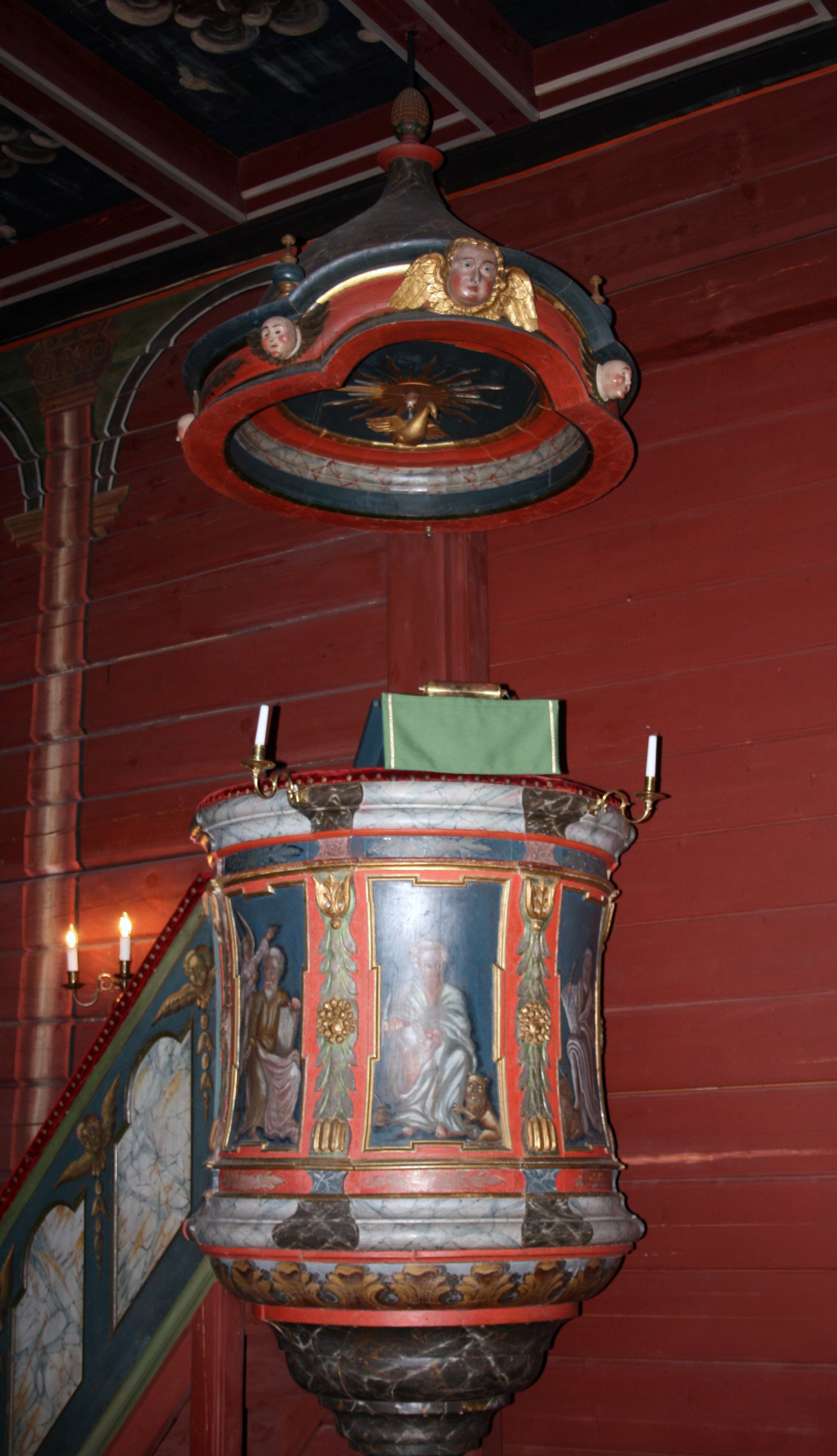

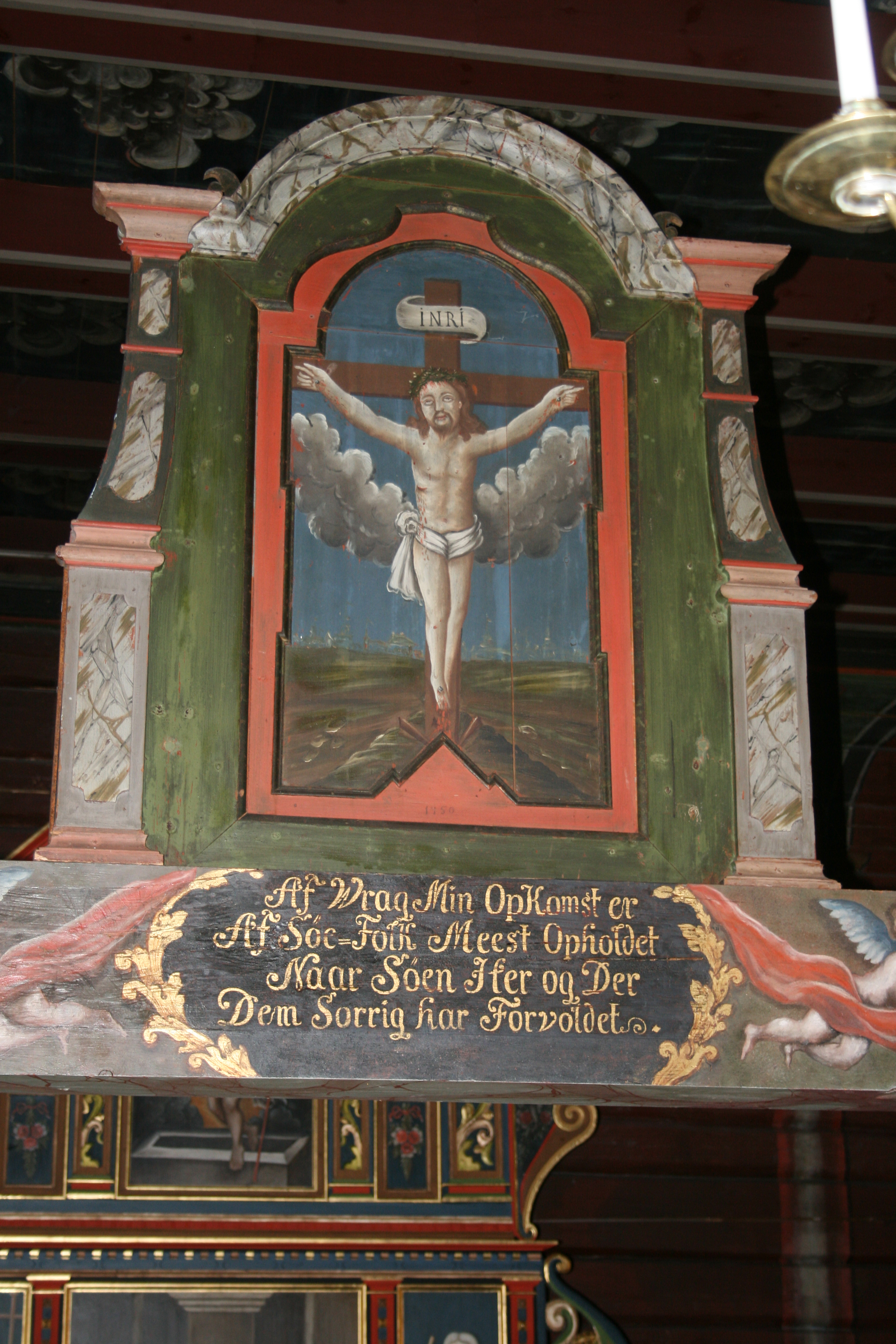

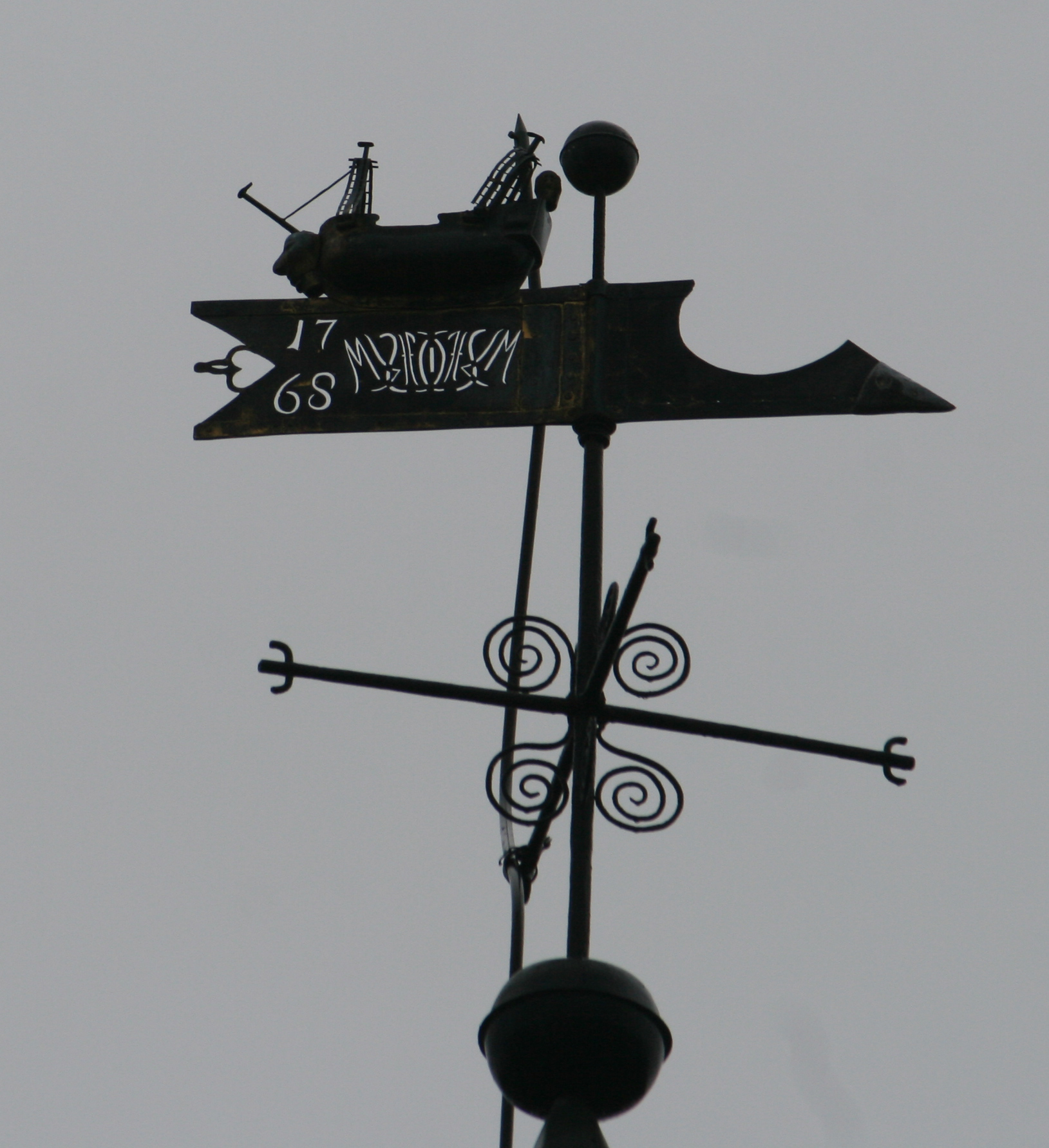

== See also ==
- List of churches in Agder og Telemark
