= Flosterøya =

Lake in Agder, Norway

- Interactive map of the island

Geography
- Location: Agder, Norway
- Coordinates: 58.53595°N 8.95953°E
- Area: 7.9 km^{2} (3.1 sq mi)
- Length: 6.5 km (4.04 mi)
- Width: 2 km (1.2 mi)

Administration
- Norway
- County: Agder
- Municipality: Arendal Municipality

Flosterøya is an island in Arendal Municipality in Agder county, Norway. The 7.9-square-kilometre (3.1 sq mi) island lies along the Skagerrak coast between the islands of Tromøya to the southwest and Tverrdalsøya to the northeast. The island lies about 11 kilometres (6.8 mi) northeast of the town of Arendal. Some of the larger villages on the island include Arnevik, Narestø, and Kalvøysund. The island has a bridge connection to the mainland at the southwest corner of the island and there is a bridge connection to Kilsund on the neighboring island of Tverrdalsøya at the north end. The historic Flosta Church is located just north of Narestø on the island of Flostaøya.

== History ==
The island was historically part of the old Dybvaag Municipality until 1902. In 1902, the island (along with Tverrdalsøya and part of the mainland) became a part of the new Flosta Municipality. In 1962, the island became a part of the new Moland Municipality, but that only lasted until 1992 when the island was merged into Arendal Municipality.

== Media gallery ==
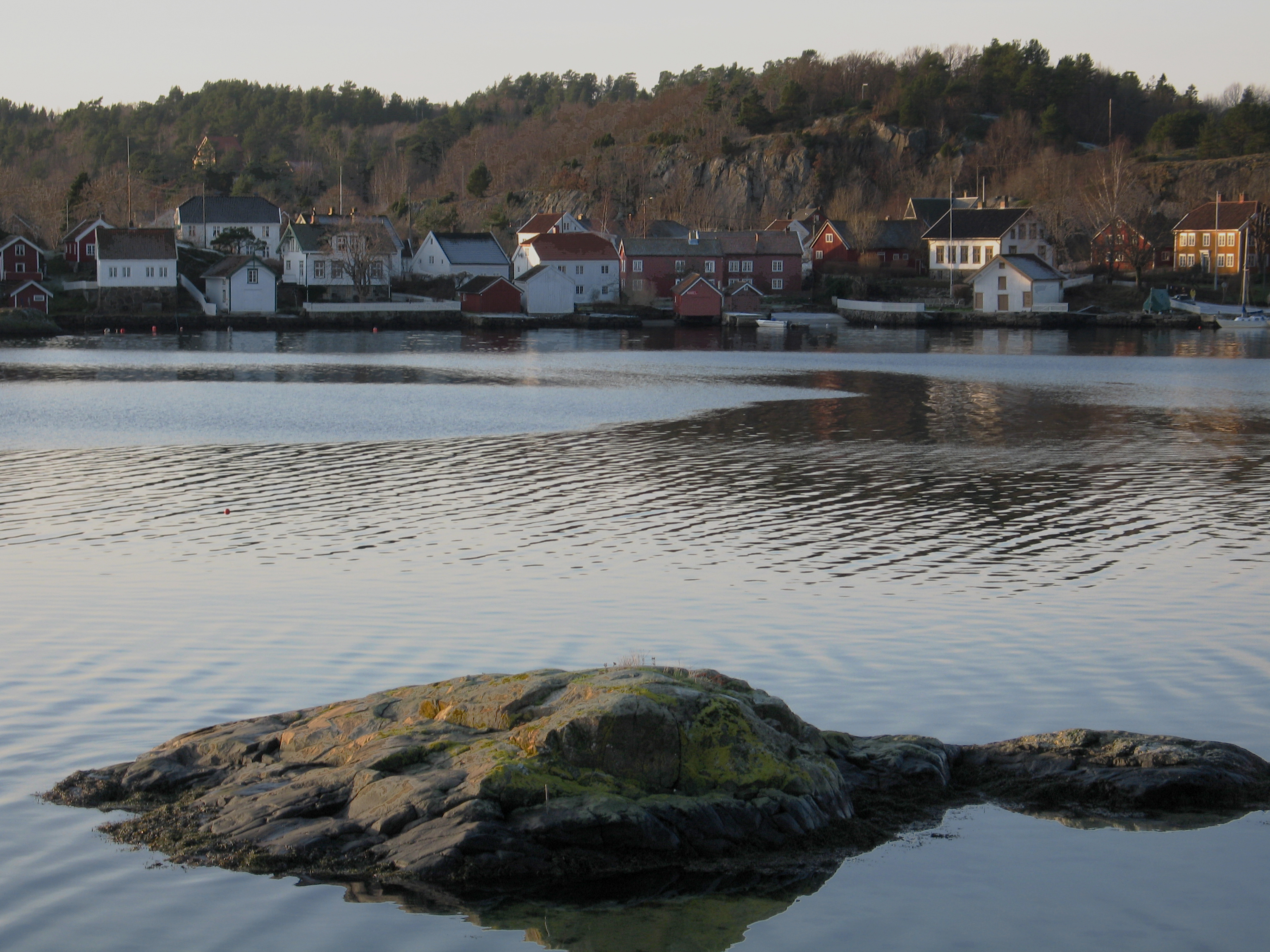
Village of Narestø

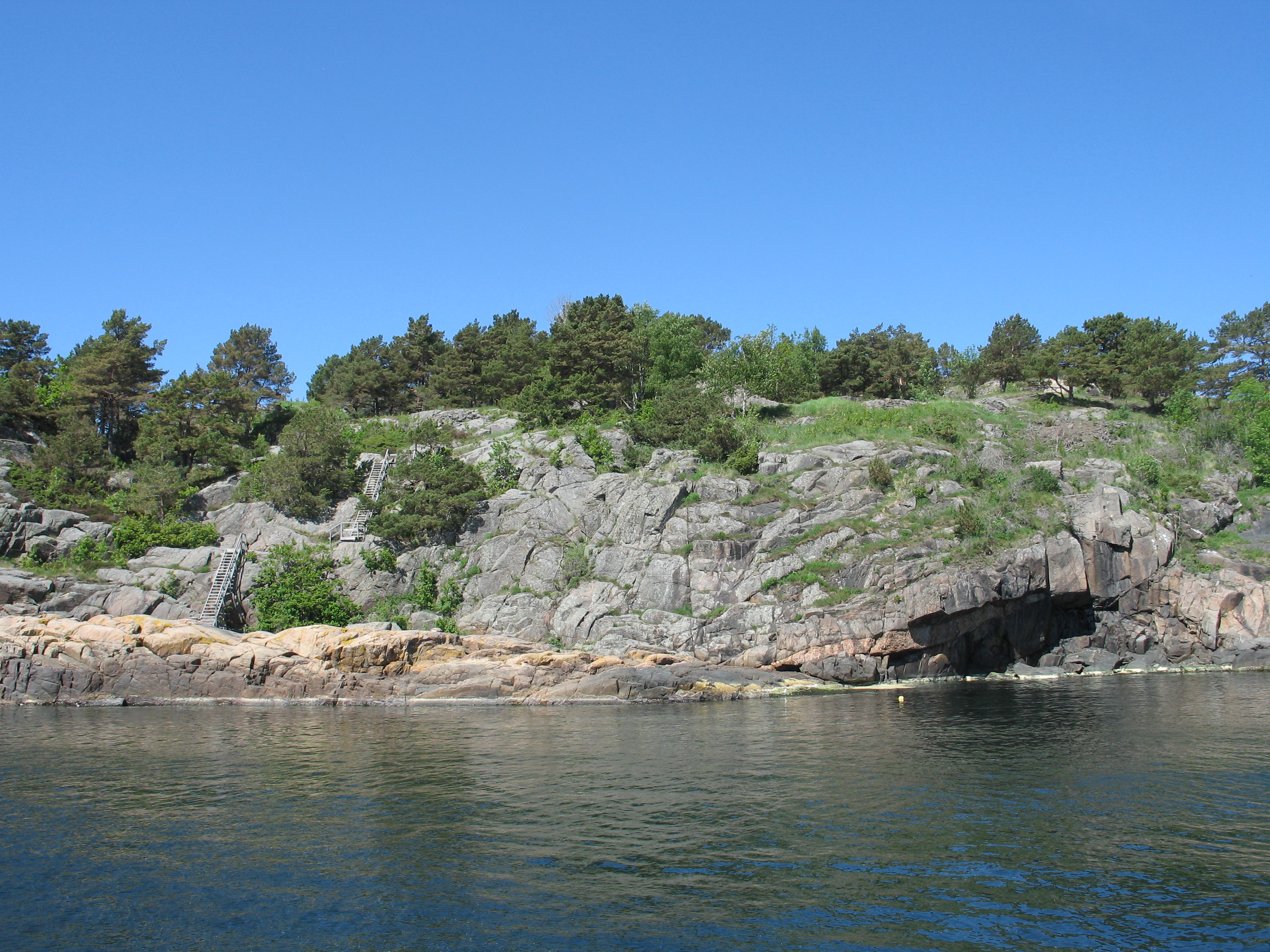
View of the eastern shore near Kalvøysund

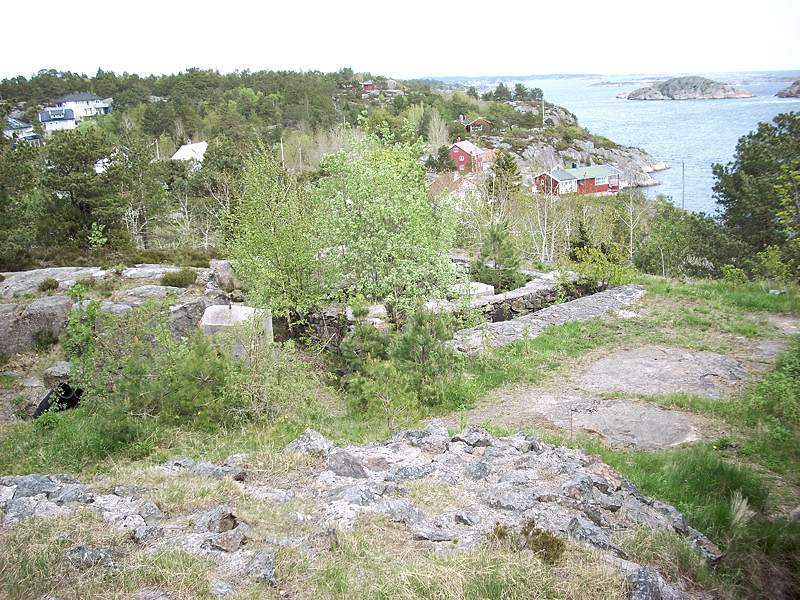
View of Kalvøysund

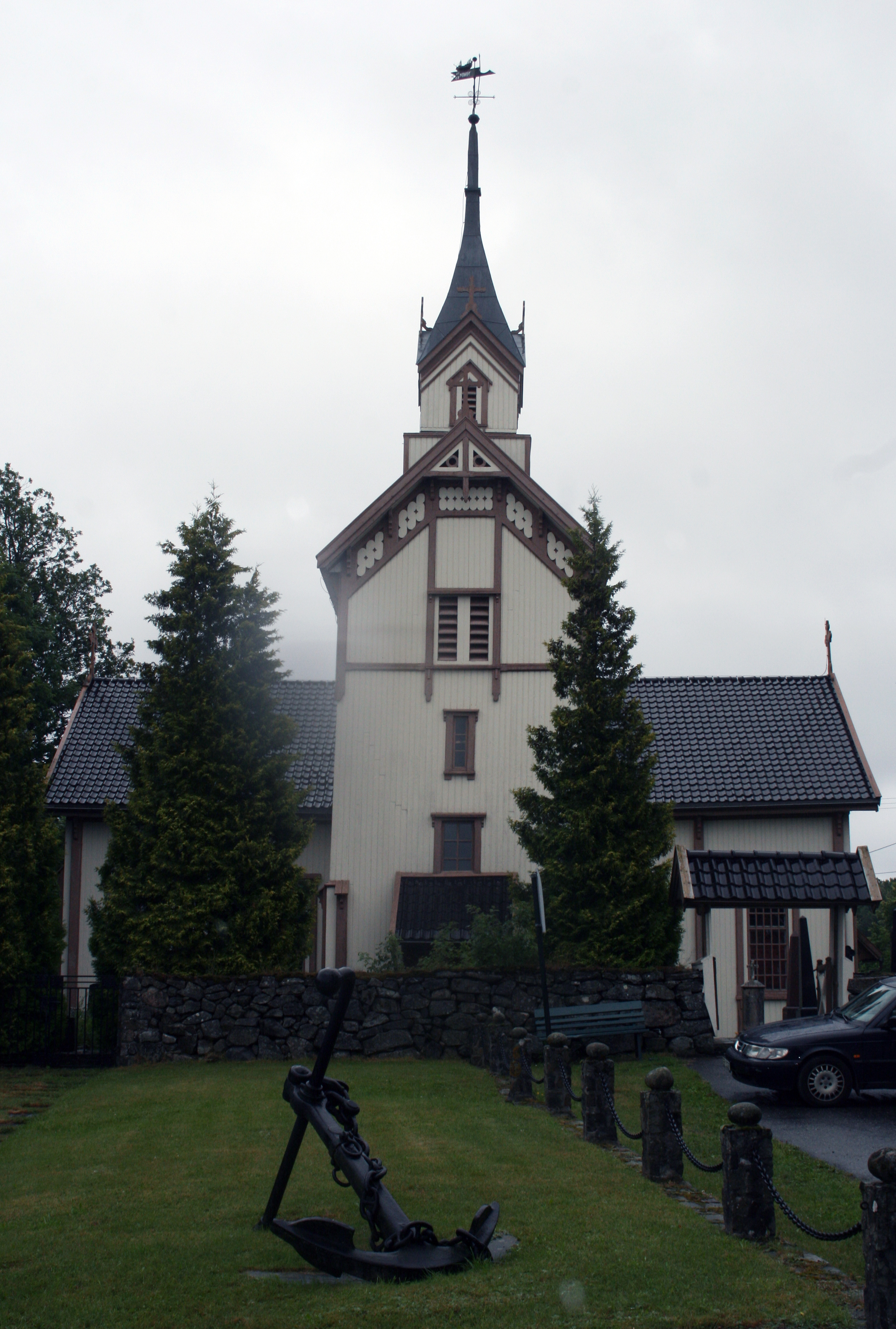
Flosta Church

== See also ==
- List of islands of Norway
