= Norwegian county road =

Highway in Norway owned and maintained by the local county municipality

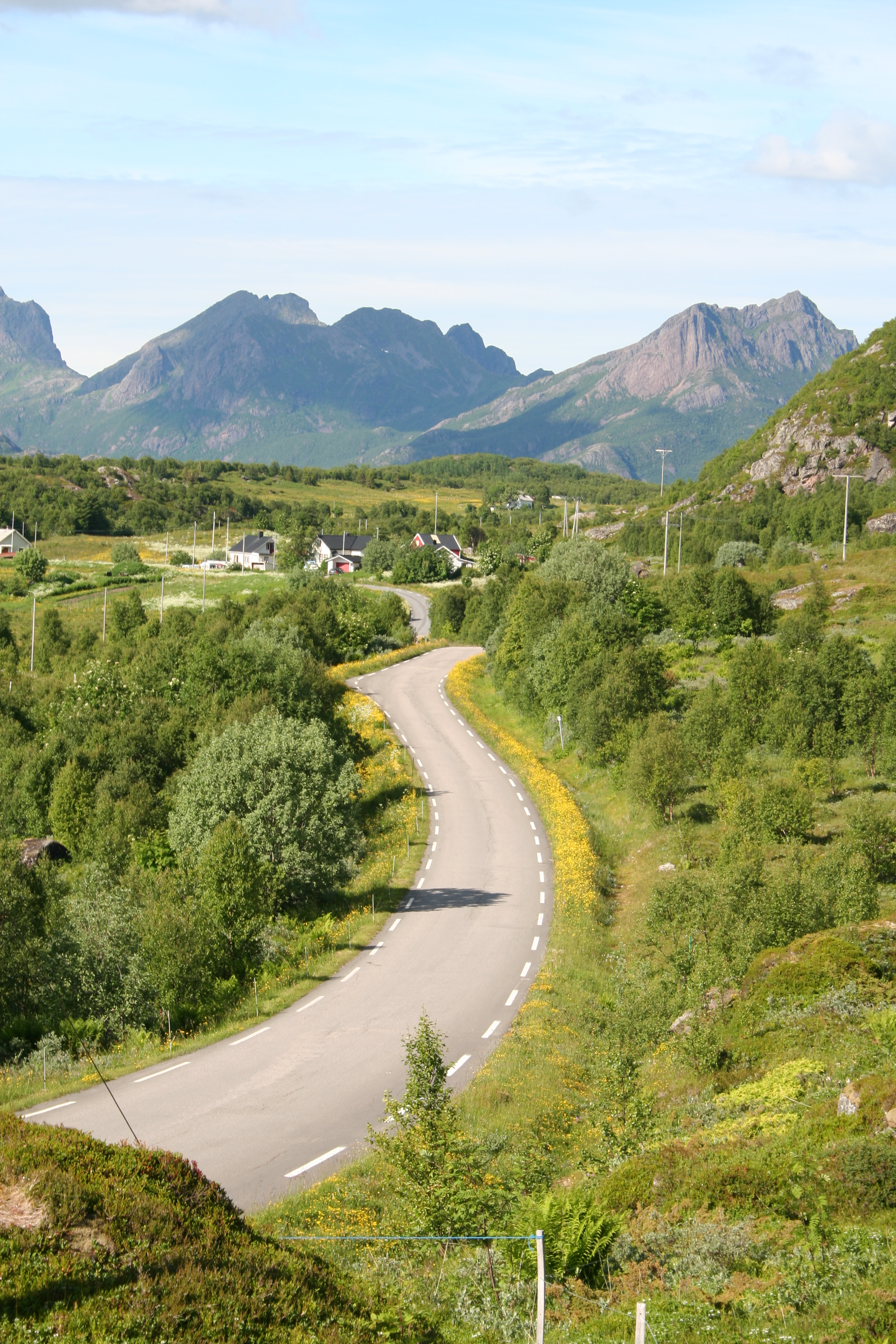
View of fylkesvei 7636 (885 before 2019) in Nordland county

A Norwegian county road (Bokmål: fylkesvei or Nynorsk: fylkesveg) is a highway in Norway owned and maintained by the local county municipality. Some of the roads have road signs. The signs are white with black numbers.

== History ==
In 1931, a system of national roads (riksvei), county roads (fylkesvei), and municipal roads (kommunal vei) was established. In 2009, there were a total of 27,262 kilometres (16,940 mi) of county roads in Norway. This accounted for 29.2% of the 93,247 kilometres (57,941 mi) public roads in Norway.

On 1 January 2010, most national roads that were not trunk roads (stamvei) were transferred to the counties and therefore became county roads. On that date 17,200 kilometres (10,700 mi) of highway and 78 kilometres (48 mi) of ferry travel was transferred to the counties, at a compensation of 6.9 billion kr. After the transfer, counties had about 44,000 kilometres (27,000 mi) of roads and the state had about 10,000 kilometres (6,200 mi) of its road network. After the reform came into force, there are two types of county roads in Norway—the original (now called secondary) county roads that were not signposted and the new county roads that are numbered (the former national roads).

In 2019 there was a renumbering reform mainly affecting secondary county roads. Those were numbered per county from 1 and up, so that multiple roads in the country could have the same number. In 2019 secondary county roads were mostly given four digit numbers, and some primary county and national road numbers changed, so that every road has a unique number. Secondary county roads still do not have signposted numbers, so car drivers didn't notice so much.

== See also ==
- Norwegian national road
