= Nordlia (Kristiansand) =

- Neighborhood in Kristiansand
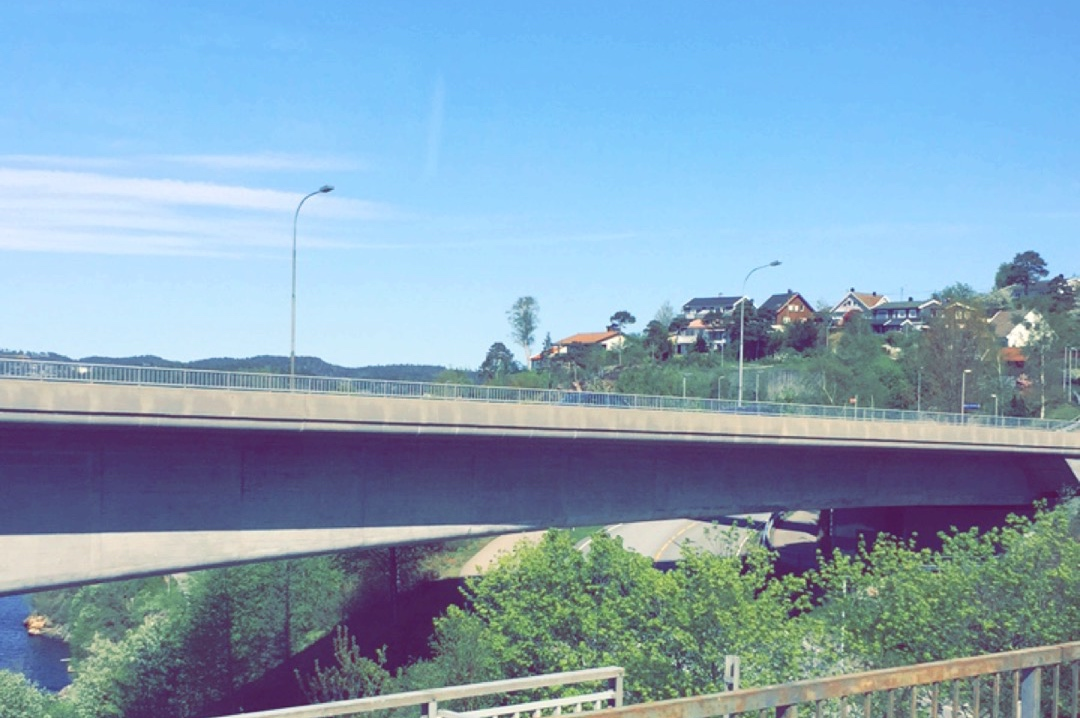
- View of the neighborhood
- Interactive map of Nordlia
- Coordinates: 58.1617°N 08.0669°E
- Country: Norway
- County: Agder
- Municipality: Kristiansand
- Borough: Oddernes
- District: Søm
- Elevation: 56 m (184 ft)
- Time zone: UTC+01:00 (CET)
  - Summer (DST): UTC+02:00 (CEST)
- Postal code: 4637
- Area code: 38

Nordlia is a neighborhood in the city of Kristiansand in Agder county, Norway. It is a part of the district of Søm. Nordlia is located on the eastern shore of the Topdalsfjorden, near the eastern end of the Varodd Bridge, in the northern part of Søm. The neighborhoods of Rona and Strømme lie to the east.

== Transport ==
The E18 passes beneath Nordlia through the Haumyrhei Tunnel. Nordlia is served by bus line M3, operating from 05:00 to 24:00 daily, with night buses on weekends and additional direct buses during rush hours.
