= Norwegian County Road 3 =

Road in Agder, Norway

County Road 3
- Bokmål: Fylkesvei 3 Nynorsk: Fylkesveg 3

Route information
- Length: 19.9 km (12.4 mi)

Major junctions
- North end: E18 in Rona, Kristiansand
- Fv401 in Strømsdalen, Kristiansand; Fv10 in Korsvik, Kristiansand; Fv9 in Dvergsnes, Kristiansand; Fv11 in Holte, Kristiansand; Fv4 in Kirkevik, Kristiansand
- South end: Fv401 in Lykkedrang, Kristiansand

Location
- Country: Norway

Highway system
- Roads in Norway; National Roads; County Roads

Norwegian County Road 3 is a county road in Agder county, Norway. It goes around the district of Søm, to the district of Randesund in the borough Oddernes. The road goes from Rona to Torsvik - Saltbustad - Korsvik - Dvergsnes - Odderhei - Holte - Tømmerstø - Vrånes - Kirkevik - Lykkedrag. The road ends with Norwegian County Road 401 which continues to Kristiansand, in west and Lillesand in east.
