= Norwegian County Road 401 =

Road in Agder, Norway

County Road 401
- Bokmål: Fylkesvei 401; Nynorsk: Fylkesveg 401

Route information
- Maintained by Norwegian Public Roads Administration
- Length: 18.7 km (11.6 mi)

Major junctions
- West end: E18 in Rona, Kristiansand
- Fv3 in Strømsdalen, Kristiansand; Fv10 in Strømme, Kristiansand; Fv4 in Bjørnestad, Kristiansand; Fv3 in Lykkedrag, Kristiansand; Fv221 in Olabyen, Lillesand; Fv225 in Inngjerdsmyra, Lillesand; Fv226 in Høvåg, Lillesand; Fv228 in Holtesvann, Lillesand
- East end: Fv420 in Vallesverdfjorden, Lillesand

Location
- Country: Norway

Highway system
- Roads in Norway; National Roads; County Roads
← Fv400	→ Fv402

Norwegian County Road 401 is a Norwegian county road in Agder county in Norway.
