= Kristiansand Bus Tveit Lines =

Local bus lines in Kristiansand, Norway

35 / 36
- Metro Lines
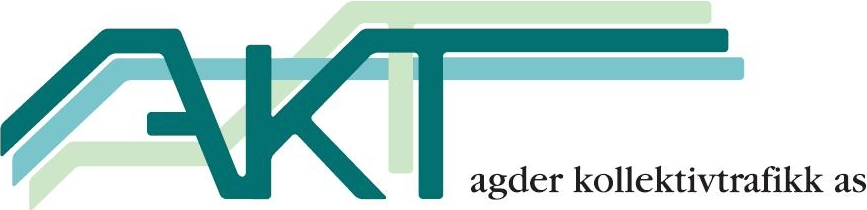

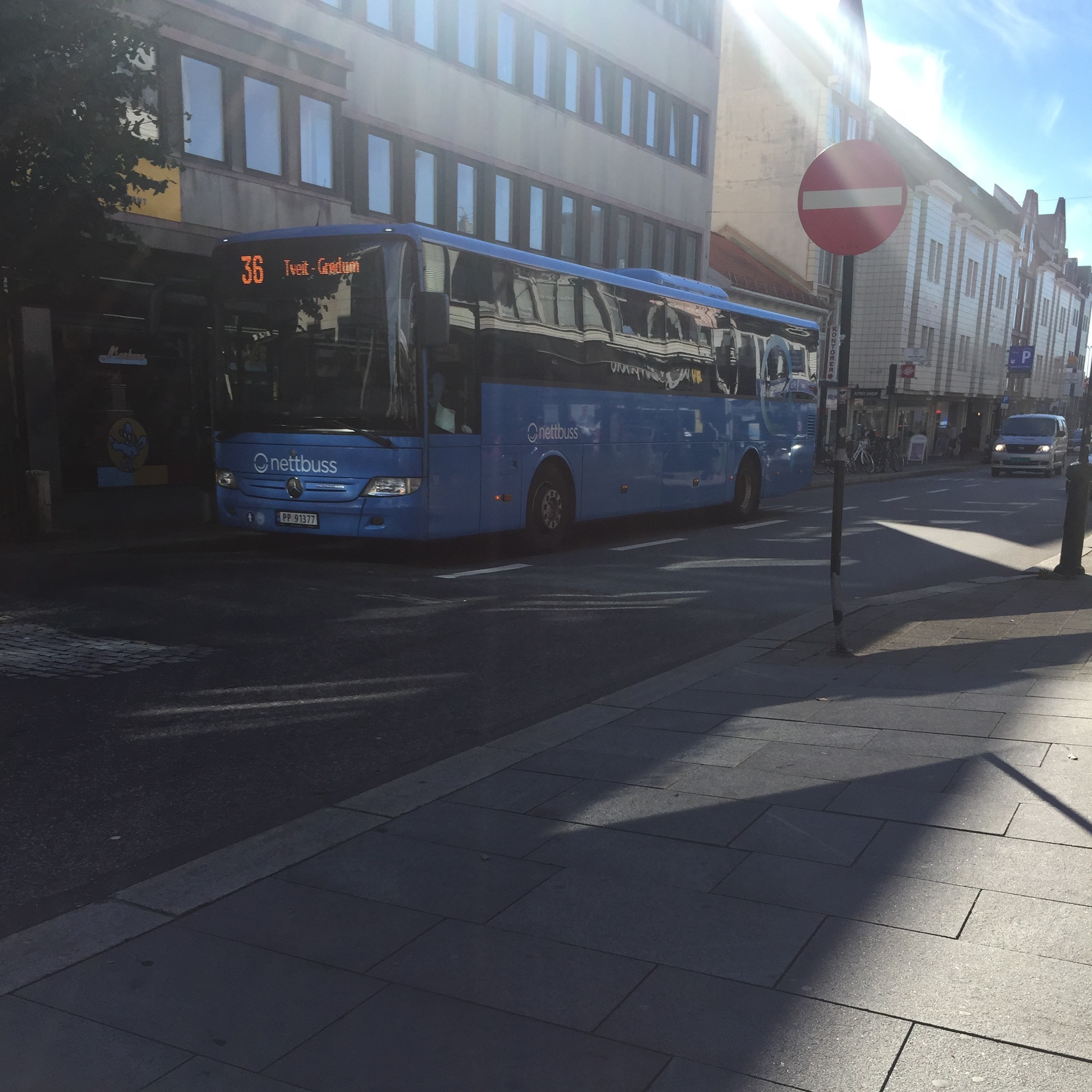

Overview
- System: Agder Kollektiv Transport
- Operator: Nettbuss
- Garage: Mjåvann, Sørlandsparken
- Vehicle: Mercedes-Benz Citaro

Route
- Locale: Kvadraturen - UiA - Rona - Tveit
- Start: 35: Kvadraturen; 36: Kvadraturen; 36: Ve
- Via: UiA, Rona
- End: 35: Kjevik – Brattvollsheia; 36: Tveit – Grødum; 36: Grødum

Service
- Operates: 17 hours (35); 05:15 - 00:15; 2 hours (36); 15:00 - 16:00; 10 hours (36); 07:40 - 22:40
- Transfers: Yes
- Timetable: 35/36

Line 35 / 36 in Kristiansand are two local bus lines in Kristiansand, Norway. They both go from downtown Kristiansand to the Airport Kjevik and Tveit.

== Description ==
=== 35 ===
Line 35 goes from Kristiansand bound for Kjevik - Brattvollshei or Kjevik - Brattvollshei / Grødum at every other hour. This bus collaborate with line 36 from Ve at Tveit. Ve is located after Hamresanden. Line 35 continues to the Airport and Brattvollshei, while 36 continues on Norwegian National Road 41 to Grødum which is just inside of Birkenes Municipality.

== Rush Hour ==
=== 36 ===
Line 36 which normally only goes from Ve to Grødum, goes from Grødum to Kristiansand in the rush hours.

== Roads ==
The lines uses some notable roads in Kristiansand. The following are:

Route	Lines	Stretch
Fv471	35, 36	Vestre Strandgate / Tollbodgata - UiA
E18	35, 36	Bjørndalssletta - Rona
Fv401	35, 36	Rona - Strømsdalen
E18	35, 36	Strømsdalen - Timeneskrysset
R41	35, 36	Timeneskrysset - Ryen
R451	35	Ryen - Kristiansand Airport, Kjevik
R41	36	Ryen - Grødum
