= Korsvik =

Korsvik Korsvig (historic spelling)
- Village
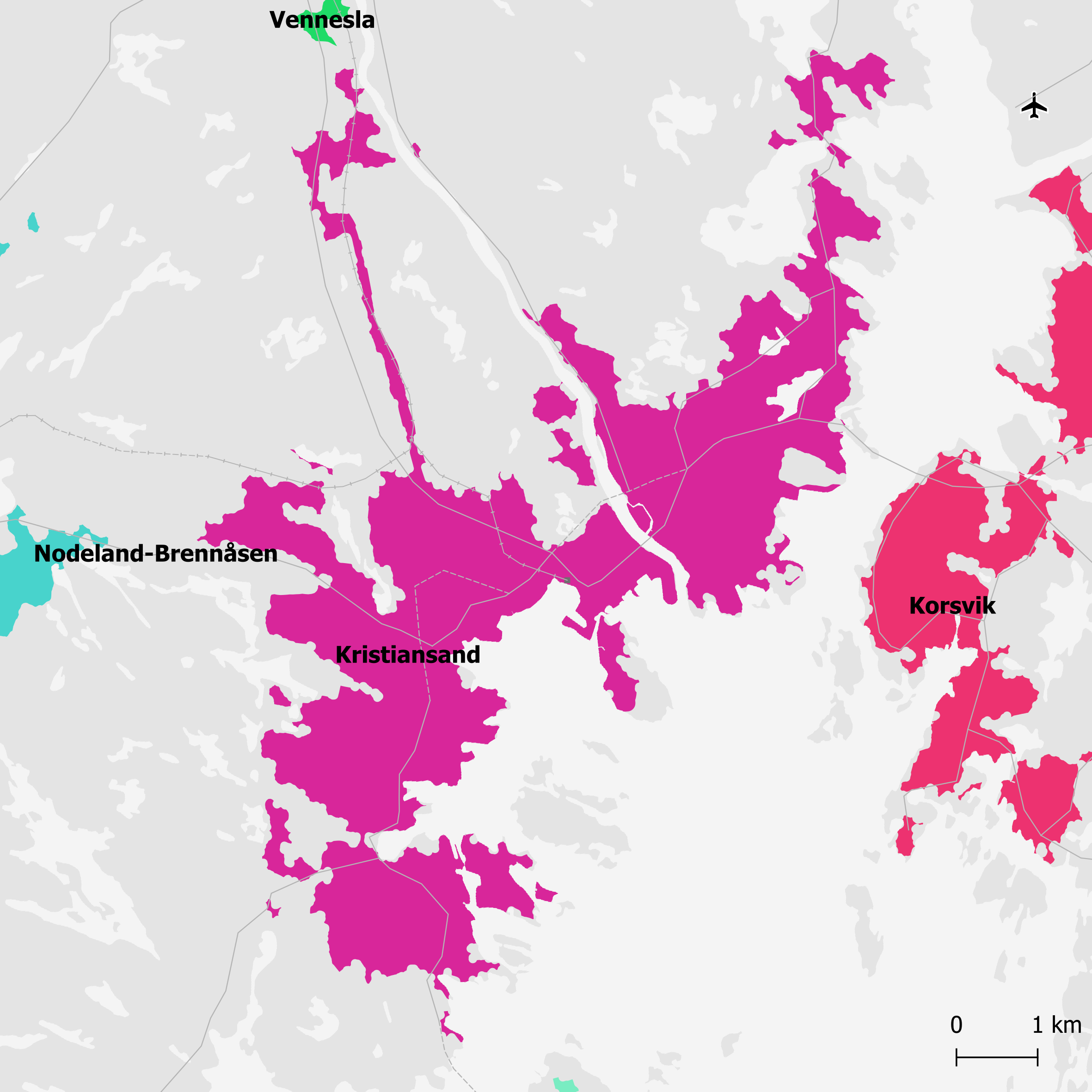
- Map of Korsvik (in red) and the city of Kristiansand (in purple)
- Interactive map of Korsvik
- Coordinates: 58.1418°N 08.0802°E
- Country: Norway
- Region: Southern Norway
- County: Agder
- Municipality: Kristiansand Municipality

Area
  - Total: 8.23 km^{2} (3.18 sq mi)
- Elevation: 21 m (69 ft)

Population (2025)
  - Total: 19,794
  - Density: 2,405/km^{2} (6,230/sq mi)
- Time zone: UTC+01:00 (CET)
  - Summer (DST): UTC+02:00 (CEST)
- Post Code: 4638 Kristiansand S

Korsvik is an urban area in Kristiansand Municipality in Agder county, Norway. The urban area is located on the east side of the Topdalsfjorden, about 9 kilometres (5.6 mi) east of the city center of Kristiansand. It is located in the districts of Søm and Randesund, south of the European route E18 highway and the Varodd Bridge. The 8.23-square-kilometre (2,030-acre) village has a population (2025) of 19,794 and a population density of 2,405 inhabitants per square kilometre (6,230/sq mi).
