= CR3 =

CR3 or CR-3 may refer to:

== Science and technology ==
- Macrophage-1 antigen, an immunological cell surface receptor for a complement component
- CR3, an x86 microprocessor control register
- CR3, a raw image format used by Canon digital cameras since 2018

== Transportation ==
- Cessna CR-3, a racing aircraft designed in 1933
- Curtiss CR-3, a racing aircraft designed in 1921
- County Road 3 (disambiguation), several roads
- Loyang MRT station, Singapore, station code CR3

== Other uses ==
- The royal cypher C III R (sometimes written as CR III) for Charles III Rex (Charles III, King)
- Crystal River 3 Nuclear Power Plant
- CR3, a postcode district in the CR postcode area
