= Søm Church =

Church in Agder, Norway

- Søm kirke
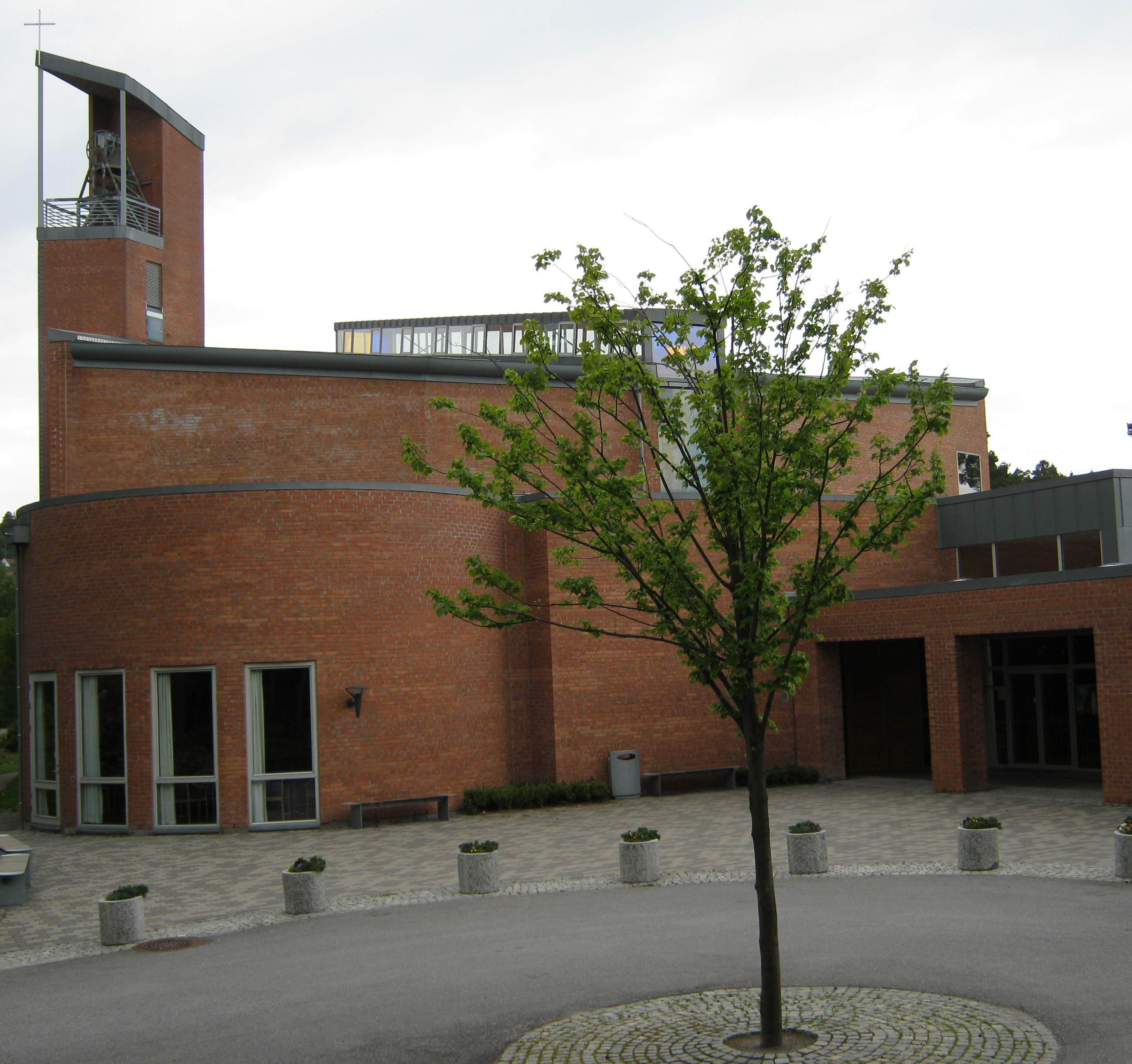
- View of the church
- Søm Church
- 58.1512°N 08.0759°E
- Location: Kristiansand Municipality, Agder
- Country: Norway
- Denomination: Church of Norway
- Churchmanship: Evangelical Lutheran

History
- Status: Parish church
- Founded: 2004
- Consecrated: 28 Nov 2004

Architecture
- Functional status: Active
- Architect(s): Arild Lauvland and Arne Åmland
- Architectural type: Fan-shaped
- Completed: 2004 (22 years ago)

Specifications
- Capacity: 400
- Materials: Red brick

Administration
- Diocese: Agder og Telemark
- Deanery: Kristiansand domprosti
- Parish: Randesund

Søm Church (Norwegian: Søm kirke) is a parish church of the Church of Norway in Kristiansand Municipality in Agder county, Norway. It is located in the district of Søm in the borough of Oddernes in the city of Kristiansand. It is one of the churches for the Randesund parish which is part of the Kristiansand domprosti (arch-deanery) in the Diocese of Agder og Telemark. The red brick church was built in a fan-shaped design in 2004 using plans drawn up by the architects Arild Lauvland and Arne Åmland. The church seats about 450 people, but it can be expanded to seat up to about 650 people.

== History ==
The foundation stone was laid in January 2000 and over the next few years, the church was constructed. The church was consecrated on 28 November 2004.

== Interior art ==
The stained glass windows were made by artist Kjell Nupen on the theme: "From darkness to light". The stained glass extends from the altar up to the ceiling and through the nave to the front door. The side windows have stained glass as well. A total of 80 square metres (860 sq ft) of wall space is covered by the stained glass window.

One large and several smaller tapestries were created by textile artist Else Marie Jakobsen.

== Media gallery ==
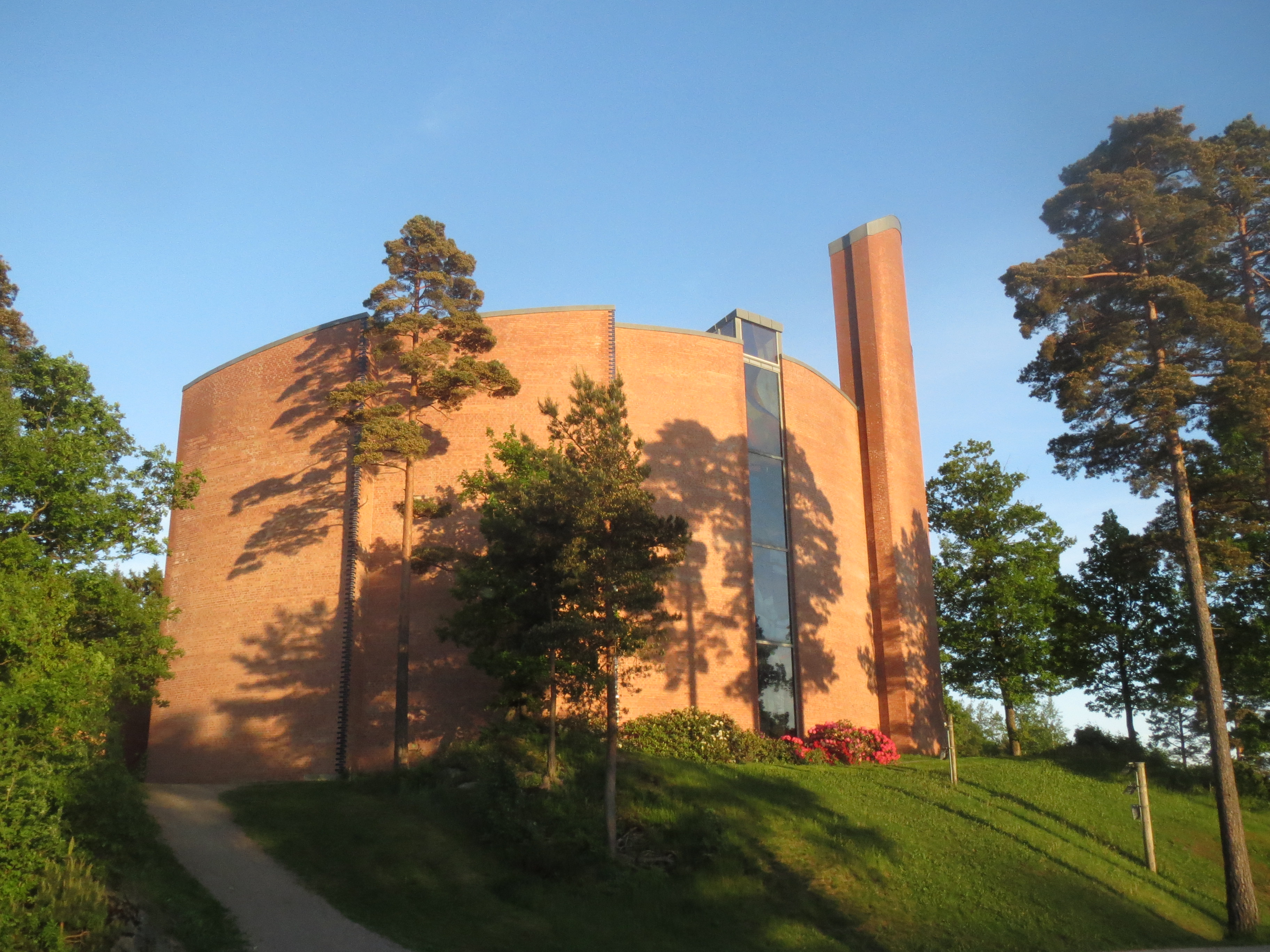
Søm Church as seen from the north

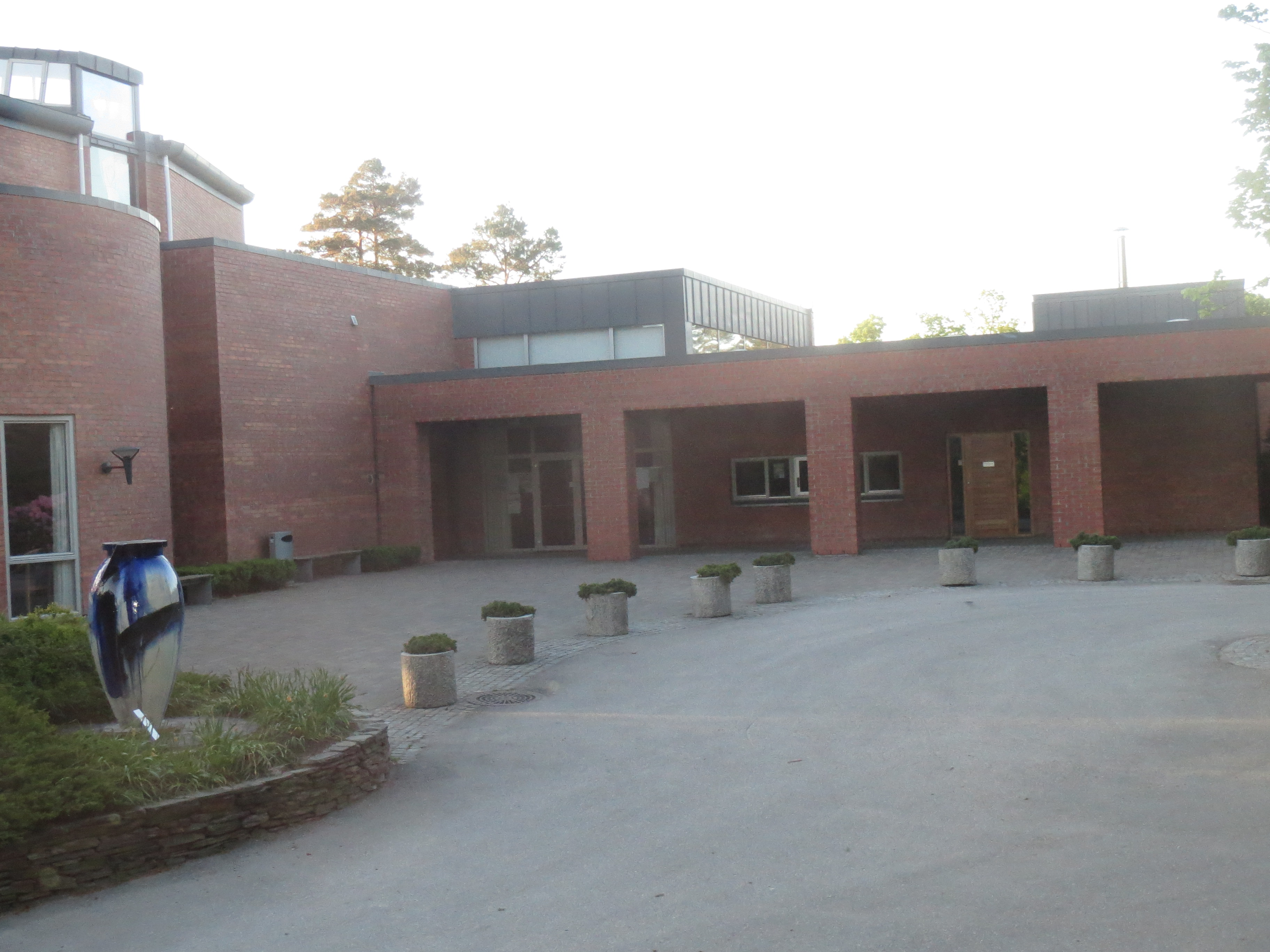
The main entrance - the jar to the left was created by artist Kjell Nupen

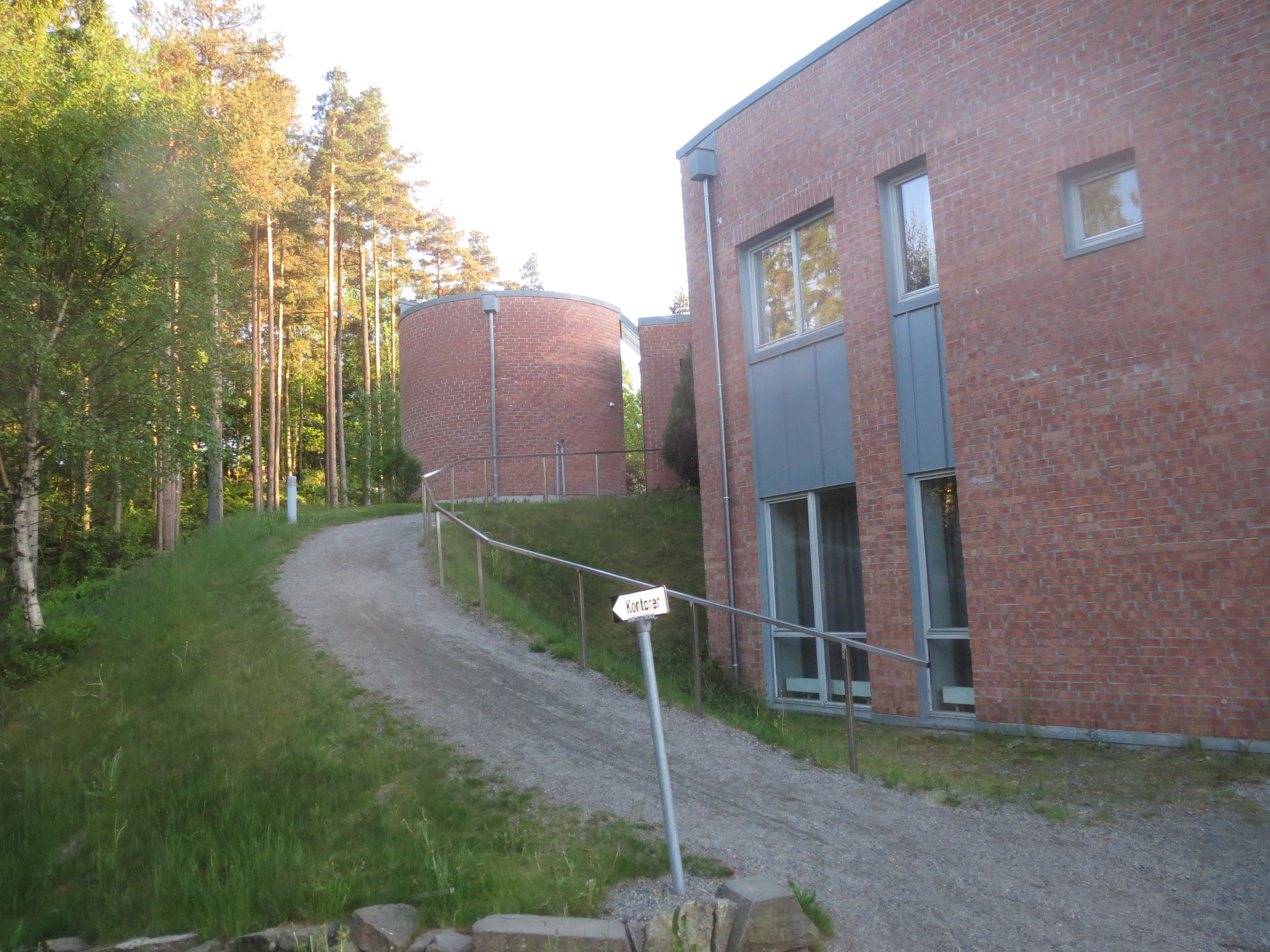
The entrance to the offices

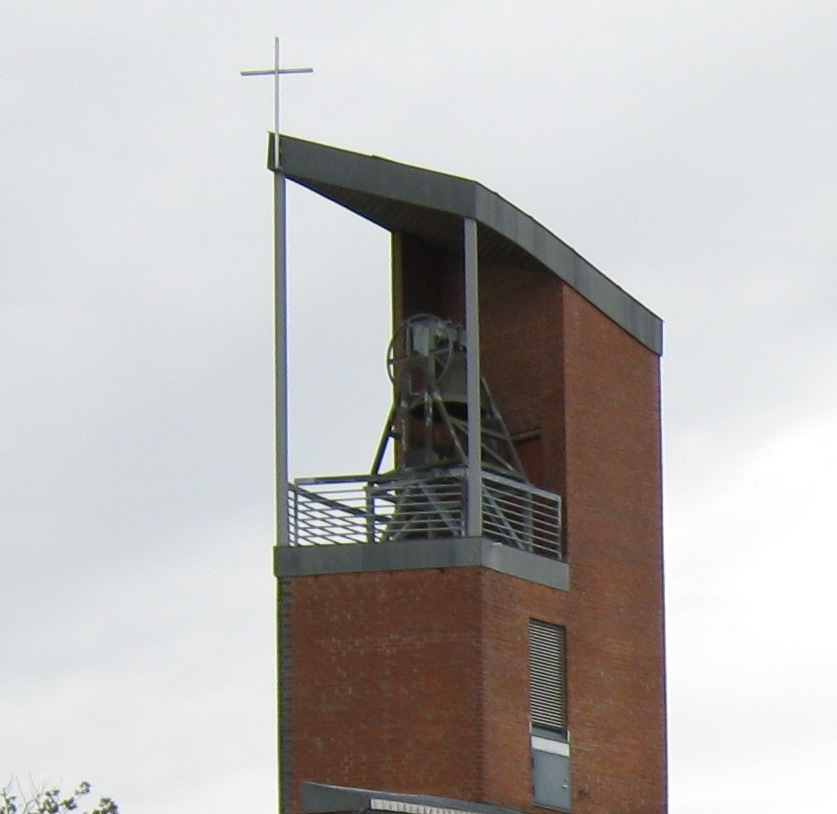
The bell tower (detail)

== See also ==
- List of churches in Agder og Telemark
