= Norwegian County Road 419 =

Road in Agder county, Norway

Coordinates: 58.5107°N 7.7720°E

County Road 419
- Bokmål: Fylkesvei 419; Nynorsk: Fylkesveg 419

Route information
- Maintained by Norwegian Public Roads Administration
- Length: 1.8 km (1.1 mi)

Major junctions
- East end: Klepp, Evje og Hornnes Municipality
- Rv9
- West end: Hannåsmoen, Evje og Hornnes Municipality

Location
- Country: Norway

Highway system
- Roads in Norway; National Roads; County Roads
← Fv418	→ Fv420

Norwegian County Road 419 (Fv419) was a Norwegian county road which ran between the villages of Hannåsmoen and Klepp in Evje og Hornnes Municipality in Agder county, Norway. The 1.8-kilometre (1.1 mi) long road included a bridge over the river Otra. It is one of five bridges over the river Otra in the municipality. The western end of the road connected with the Norwegian National Road 9 which runs north–south into the Setesdalen valley.

The road was merged and renumbered in 2019 and it is now part of the larger County Road 3792 which runs from Vånne to Hannåsmoen.
