= County Road 3 =

County Road 3 or County Route 3 may refer to:

- Norwegian County Road 3, Norway
- County Road 3 (Essex County, Ontario), Canada

== United States ==
- County Road 3 (Brevard County, Florida), an extension of current State Road 3
- County Road 3 (Volusia County, Florida), an old alignment of US 17 and pre-1945 State Road 3
- County Road 3 (Anoka County, Minnesota)
- County Road 3 (Chisago County, Minnesota)
- County Road 3 (Goodhue County, Minnesota)
- County Road 3 (Hennepin County, Minnesota)
- County Road 3 (Ramsey County, Minnesota)
- County Road 3 (St. Louis County, Minnesota)
- County Route 3 (Monmouth County, New Jersey)
- County Route 3 (Ocean County, New Jersey)
- County Route 3 (Allegany County, New York)
- County Route 3 (Cattaraugus County, New York)
- County Route 3 (Chemung County, New York)
- County Route 3 (Dutchess County, New York)
- County Route 3 (Genesee County, New York)
- County Route 3 (Greene County, New York)
- County Route 3 (Jefferson County, New York)
- County Route 3 (Livingston County, New York)
- County Route 3 (Montgomery County, New York)
- County Route 3 (Niagara County, New York)
- County Route 3 (Oneida County, New York)
- County Route 3 (Oswego County, New York)
- County Route 3 (Otsego County, New York)
- County Route 3 (Rensselaer County, New York)
- County Route 3 (Schoharie County, New York)
- County Route 3 (Schuyler County, New York)
- County Route 3 (St. Lawrence County, New York)
- County Route 3 (Steuben County, New York)
- County Route 3 (Suffolk County, New York)
- County Route 3 (Westchester County, New York)
