= Norwegian County Road 420 =

Road in Agder county, Norway

County Road 420
- Bokmål: Fylkesvei 420; Nynorsk: Fylkesveg 420

Route information
- Maintained by Norwegian Public Roads Administration
- Length: 63.8 km (39.6 mi)

Major junctions
- North end: E18 in Moland, Arendal
- Fv42 in Strømsbu, Arendal; E18 in Nedenes, Arendal; E18 in Vik, Grimstad; E18 in, Øygårdsdalen, Grimstad; E18 in Gaupemyr, Lillesand; Fv402 in Solkollen, Lillesand; E18 in Brønningsmyr, Lillesand; Fv401 in Vallesverdfjorden, Lillesand
- South end: E18 in Sørlandsparken, Kristiansand

Location
- Country: Norway

Highway system
- Roads in Norway; National Roads; County Roads
← Fv419	→ Fv421

Norwegian County Road 420 is a Norwegian county road in Agder county, Norway. The 63.8-kilometre (39.6 mi) long road runs along the coast from the European route E18 highway at the Sørlandsparken in Kristiansand Municipality in the southwest to the European route E18 in Moland in Arendal Municipality.
