= Søm =

District of Kristiansand in Agder county, Norway

District Søm
- District of Kristiansand
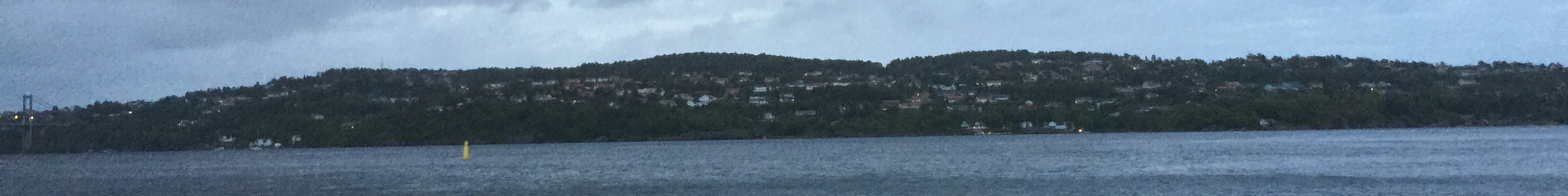
- View of the district

- Coat of arms

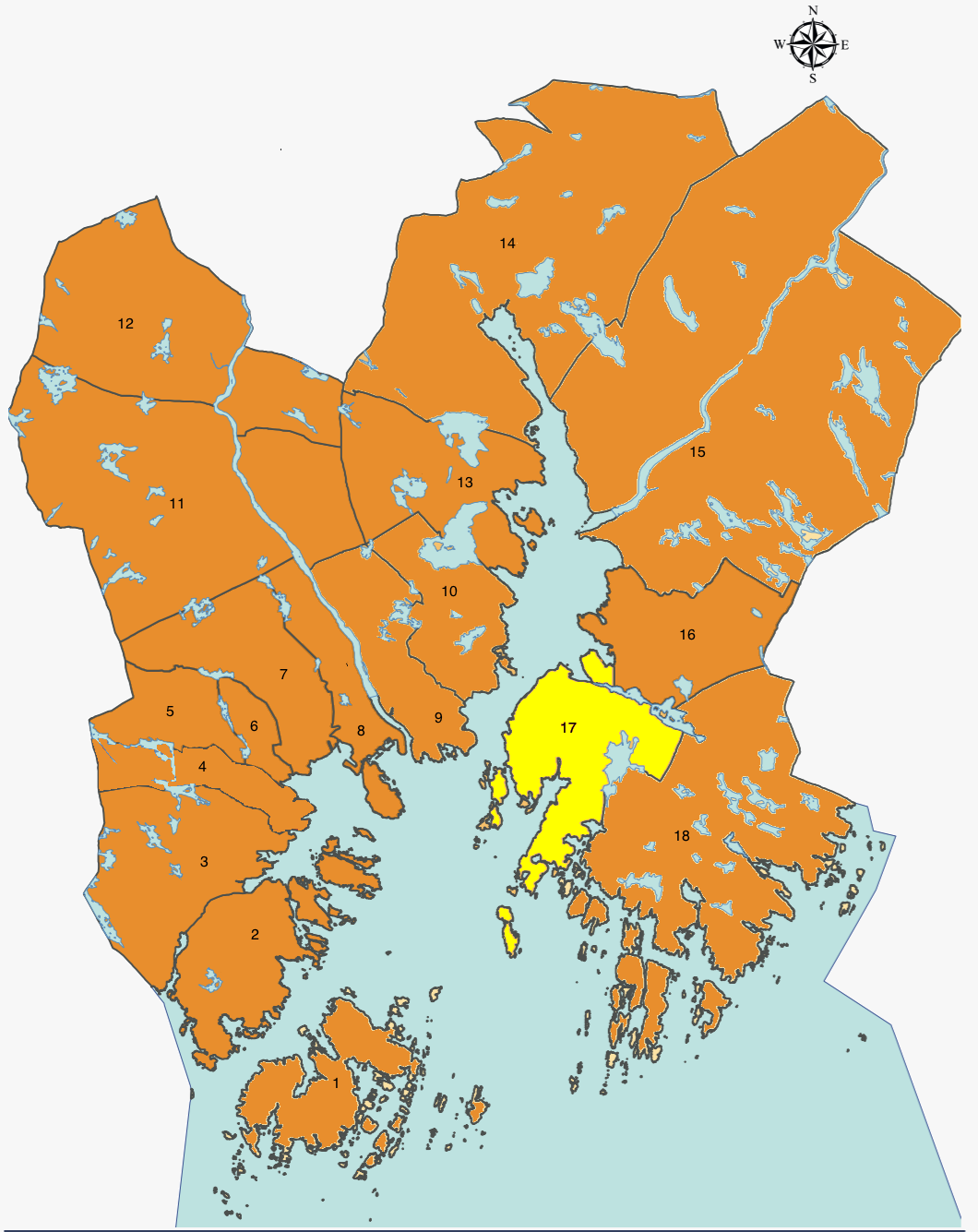
- Interactive map of District Søm
- Coordinates: 58.1524°N 08.0590°E
- Country: Norway
- Region: Southern Norway
- County: Agder
- Municipality: Kristiansand
- Borough: Oddernes
- Elevation: 80 m (260 ft)

Population (2014)
  - Total: 9,000
- Time zone: UTC+01:00 (CET)
  - Summer (DST): UTC+02:00 (CEST)
- ISO 3166 code: NO-030112
- Website: kristiansand.kommune.no

Søm is a district in the city of Kristiansand in Agder county, Norway. With a population of about 9,500 (2022), it is the third largest district in Kristiansand. The district is a part of the borough of Oddernes. Søm has borders with the district of Hånes to the north, the district of Randesund to the east and south, and the Topdalsfjorden to the west. Søm is the second most wealthy district in Kristiansand after Lund. Søm Church is located in the district.

== Neighbourhoods ==
- Bliksheia
- Elgstien
- Fuglevika
- Gudbranslia
- Haumyrheia
- Kjelleviktoppen
- Knarreviktoppen
- Knarrevikveien
- Korsvik vest
- Korsvik øst
- Liane
- Nordlia
- Rona
- Strømme
- Strømsdalen
- Søm
- Søm øst
- Sømslia
- Torsvik
- Vardåsen

== Transportation ==
Bus transportation from/through Søm
Line	Destination
M3	Søm – Slettheia
A3	Søm – Kvadraturen
N3	Søm – Slettheia
08	Rona – Randesund
17	Tømmerstø – Hellemyr
17	Tømmerstø-Frikstad – Hellemyr
N17	Tømmerstø – Kvadraturen
18	Tømmerstø Odderhei-Holte – Hellemyr
18	Dvergsnes – Hellemyr
A18	Tømmerstø Odderhei-Holte – E.g.-Sykehuset
N17	Tømmerstø – Kvadraturen
139	Høvåg-Lillesand – Kristiansand
266	Søm – Kristiansand Cathedral School

== Media gallery ==
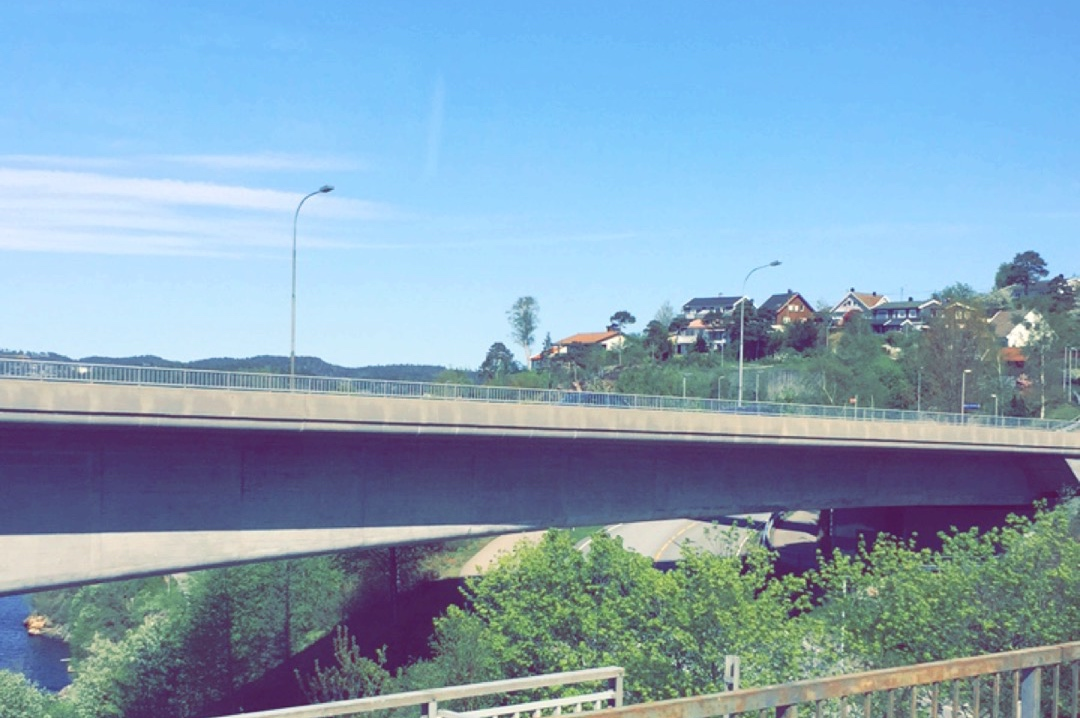
North of Søm seen from Varodd Bridge

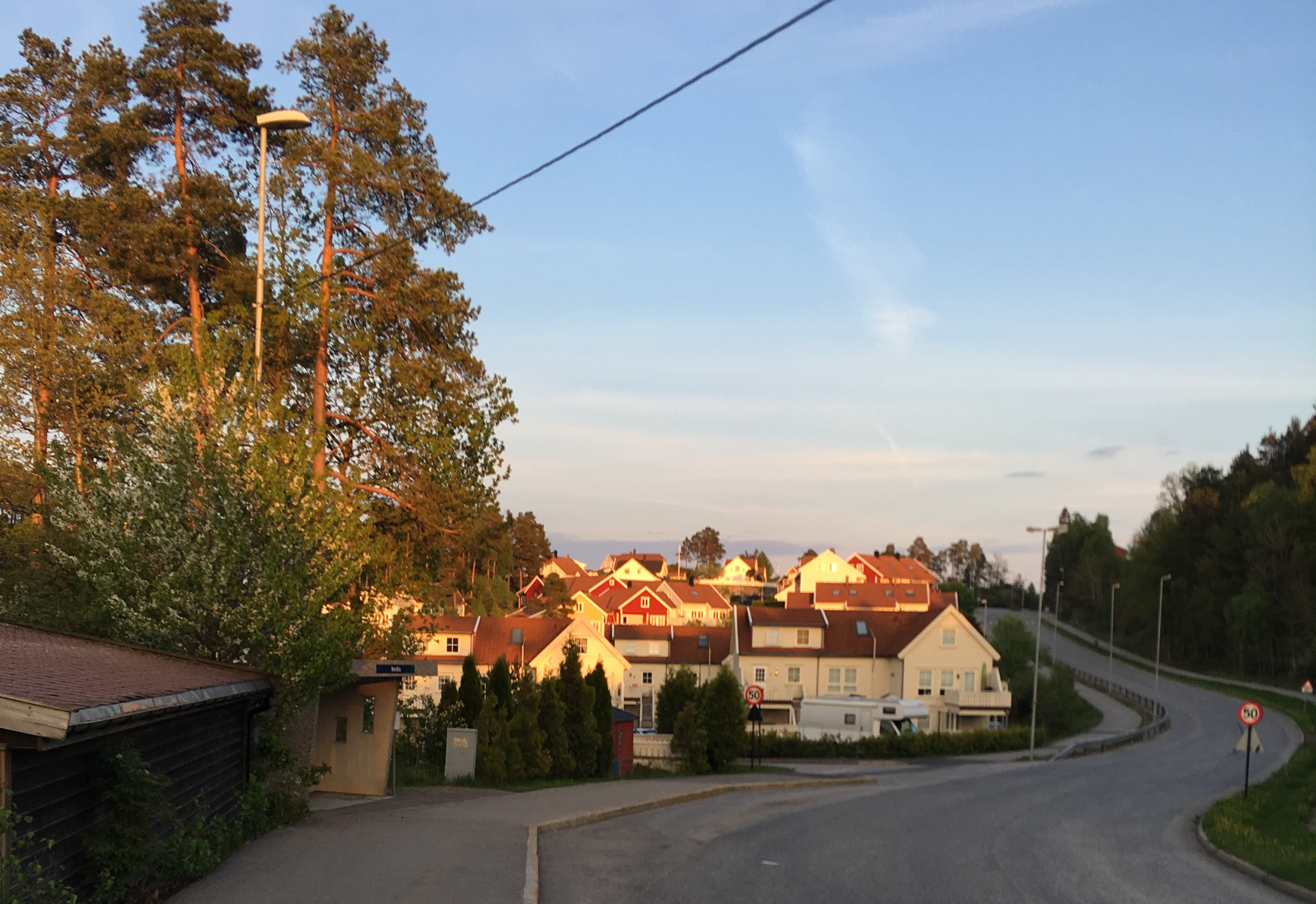
Nordlia

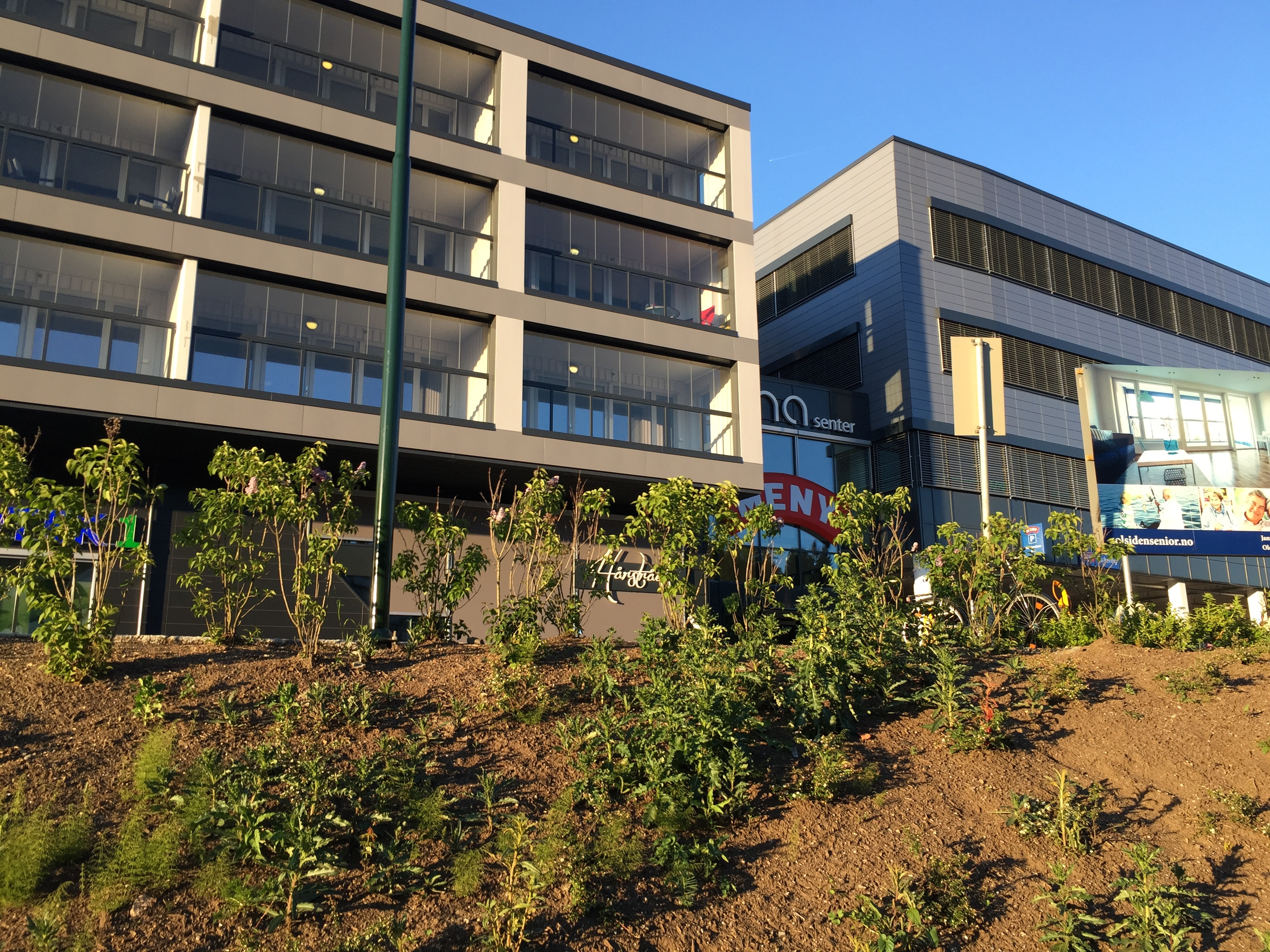
Rona senter

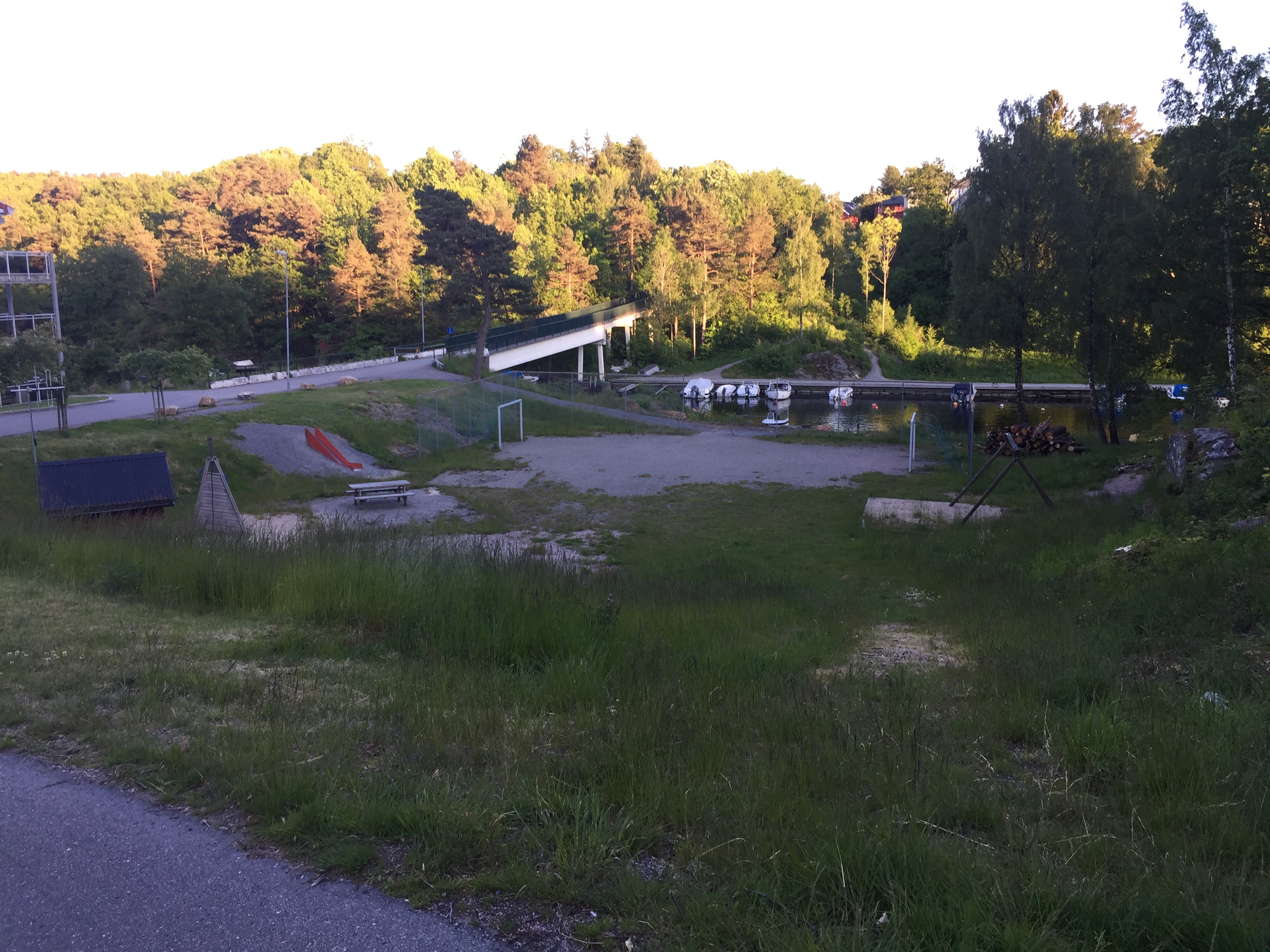
Strømsdalen

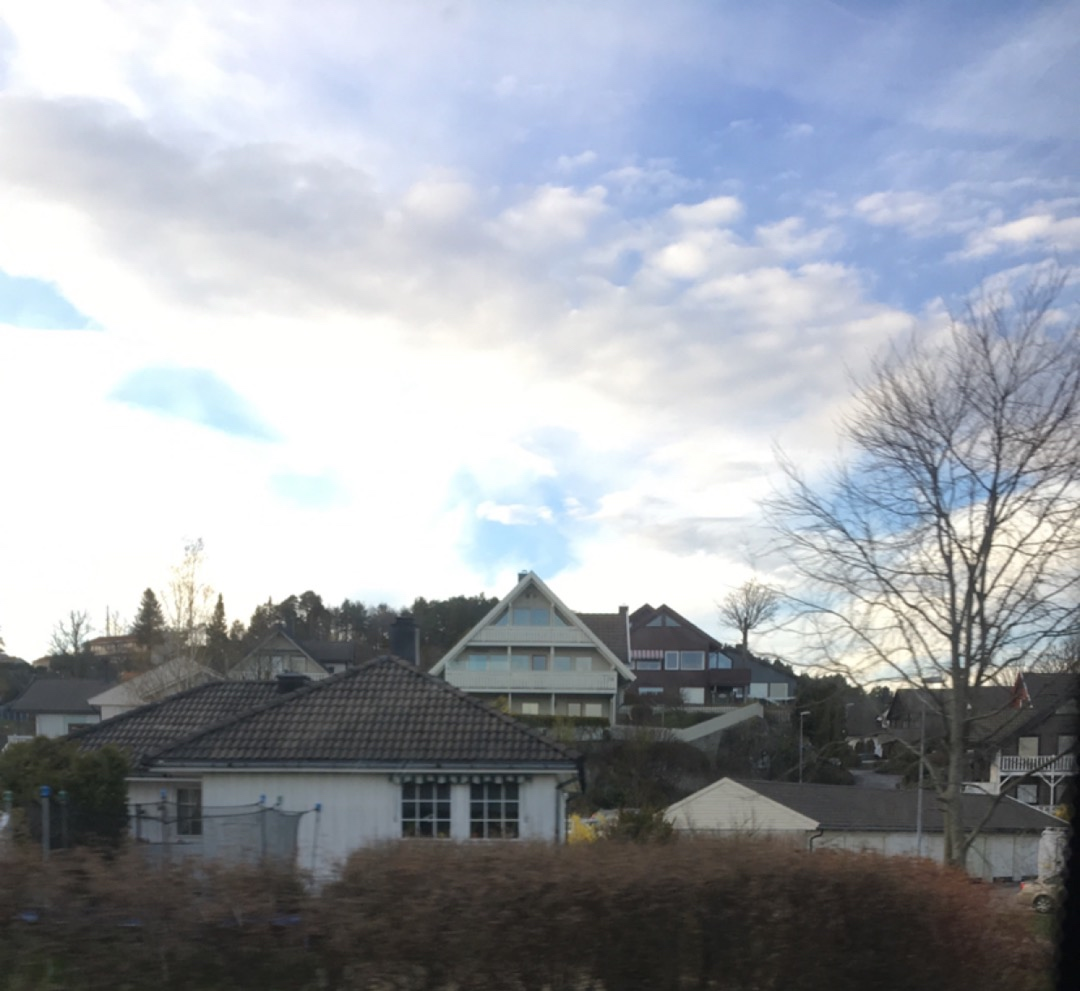
Gudbrandslia

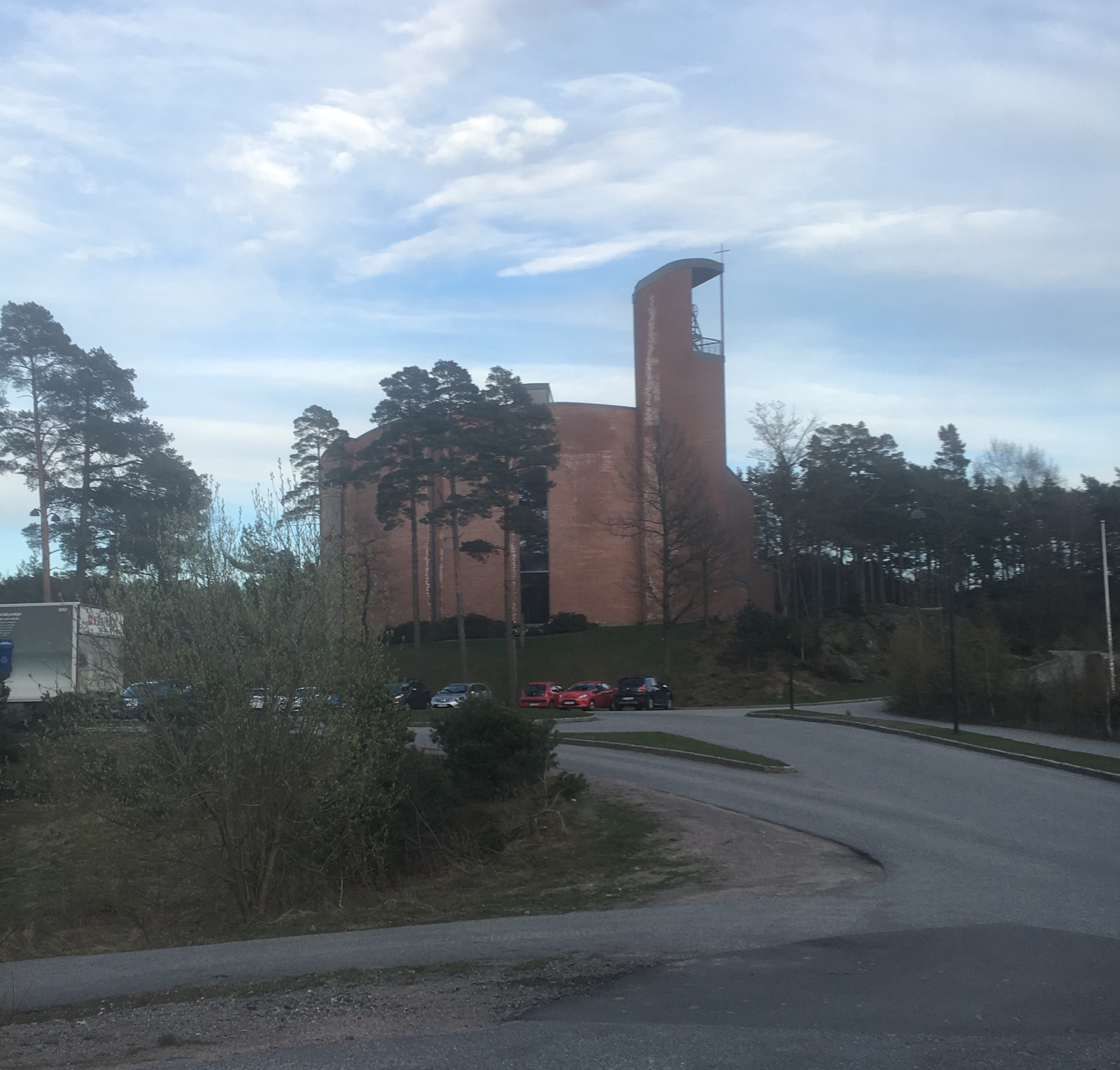
Søm Church

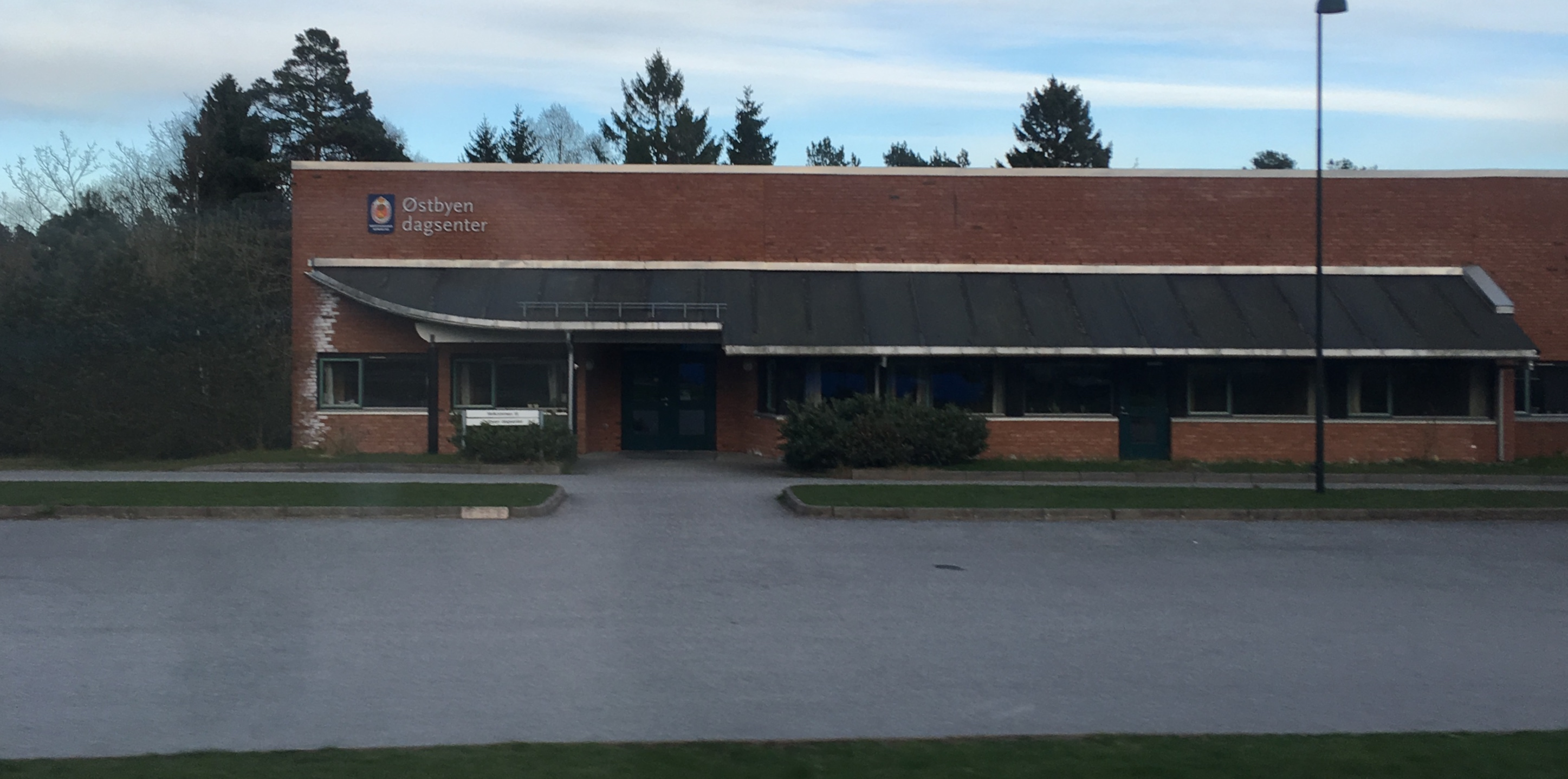
Østbyen Dagsenter, Strømme

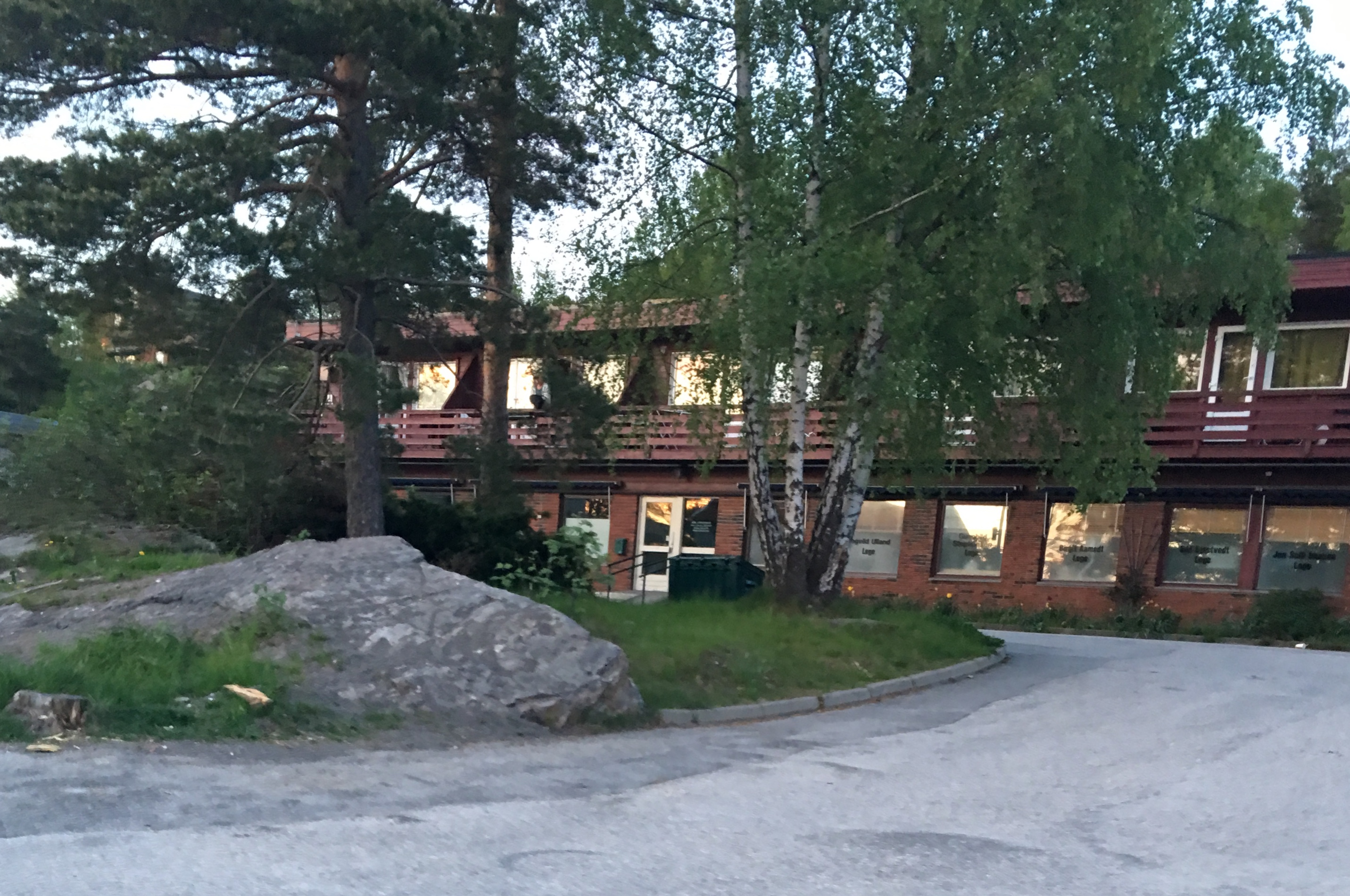
Doctor clinic at Søm

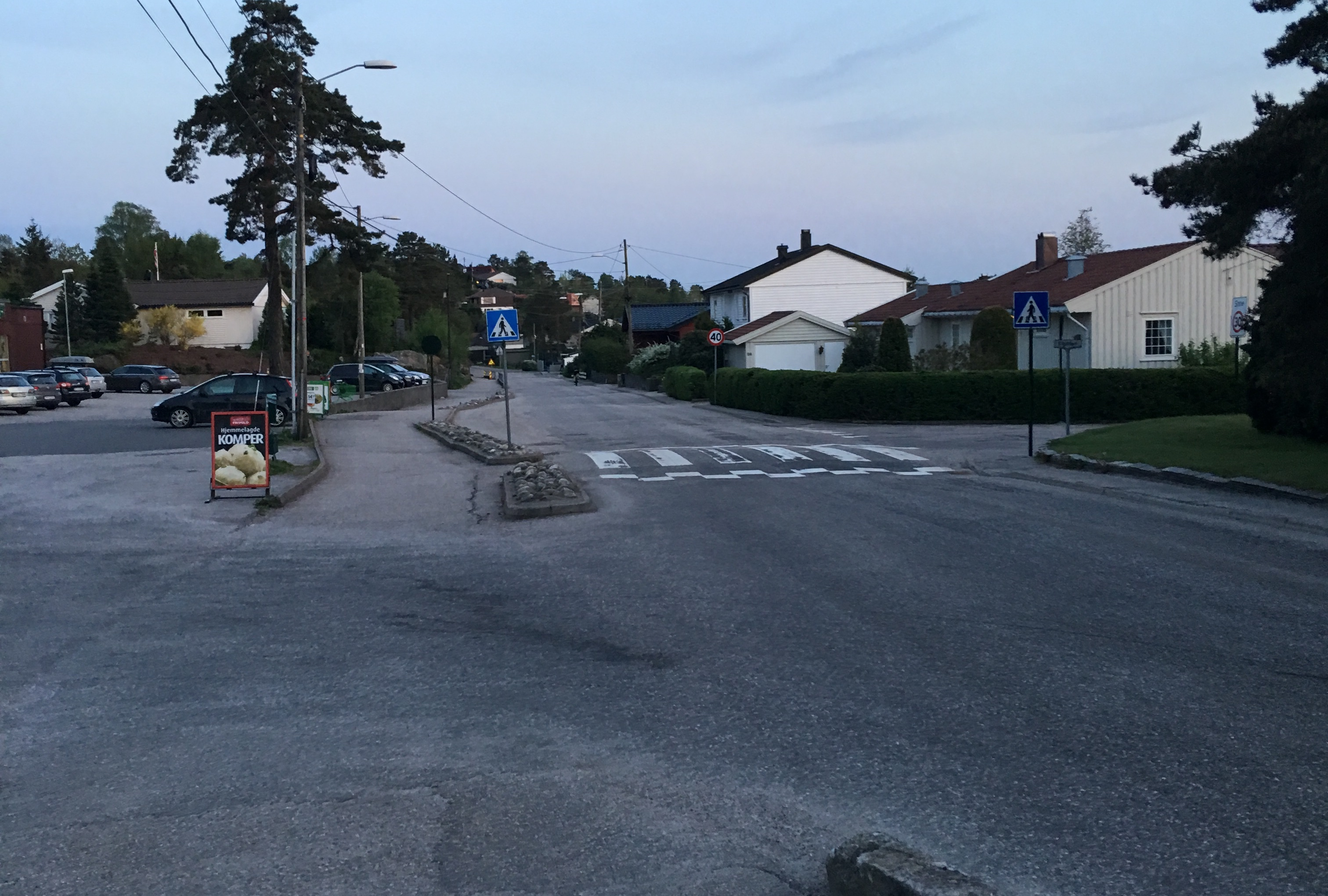
Vardåsveien

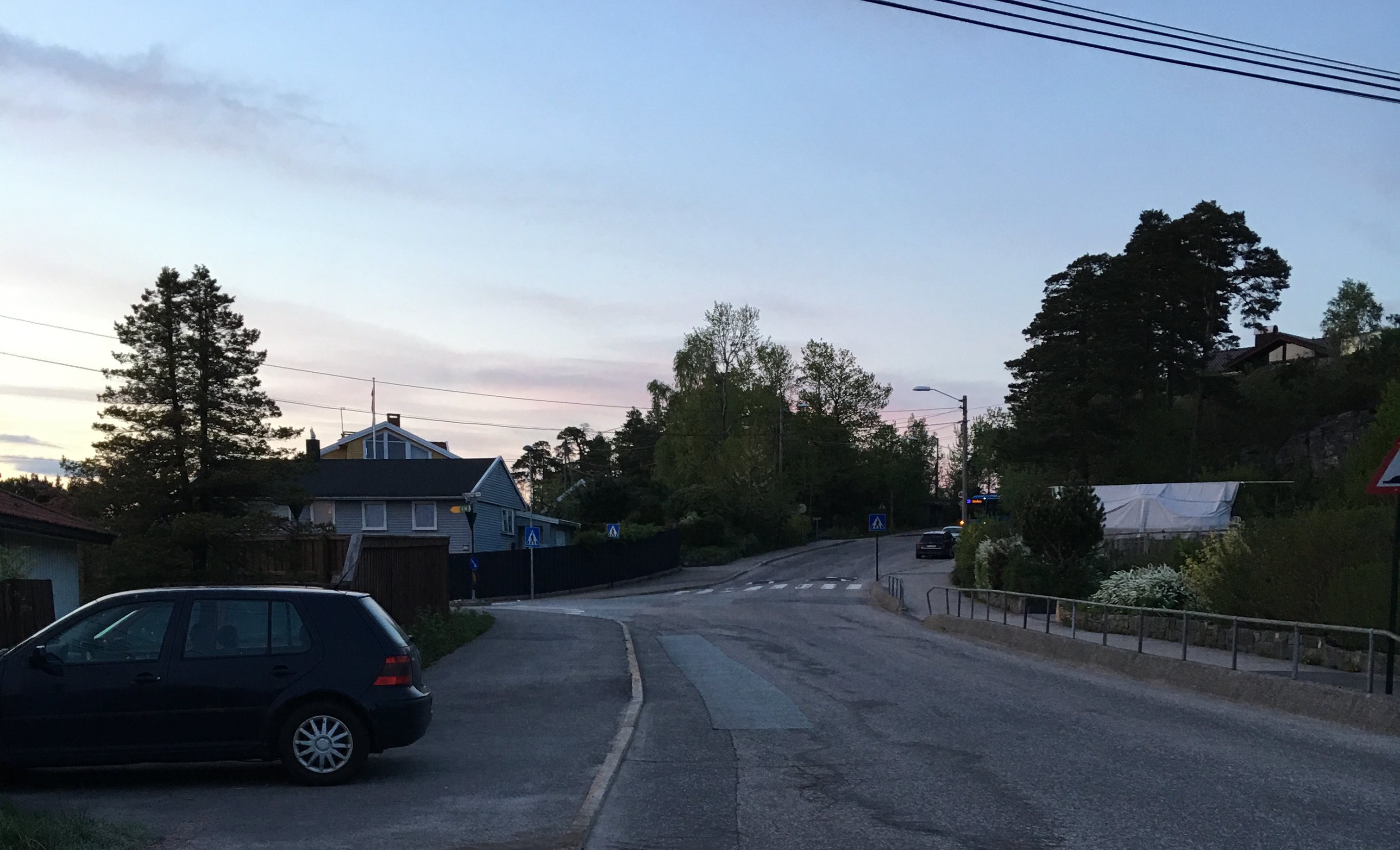
Torsvikkleiva

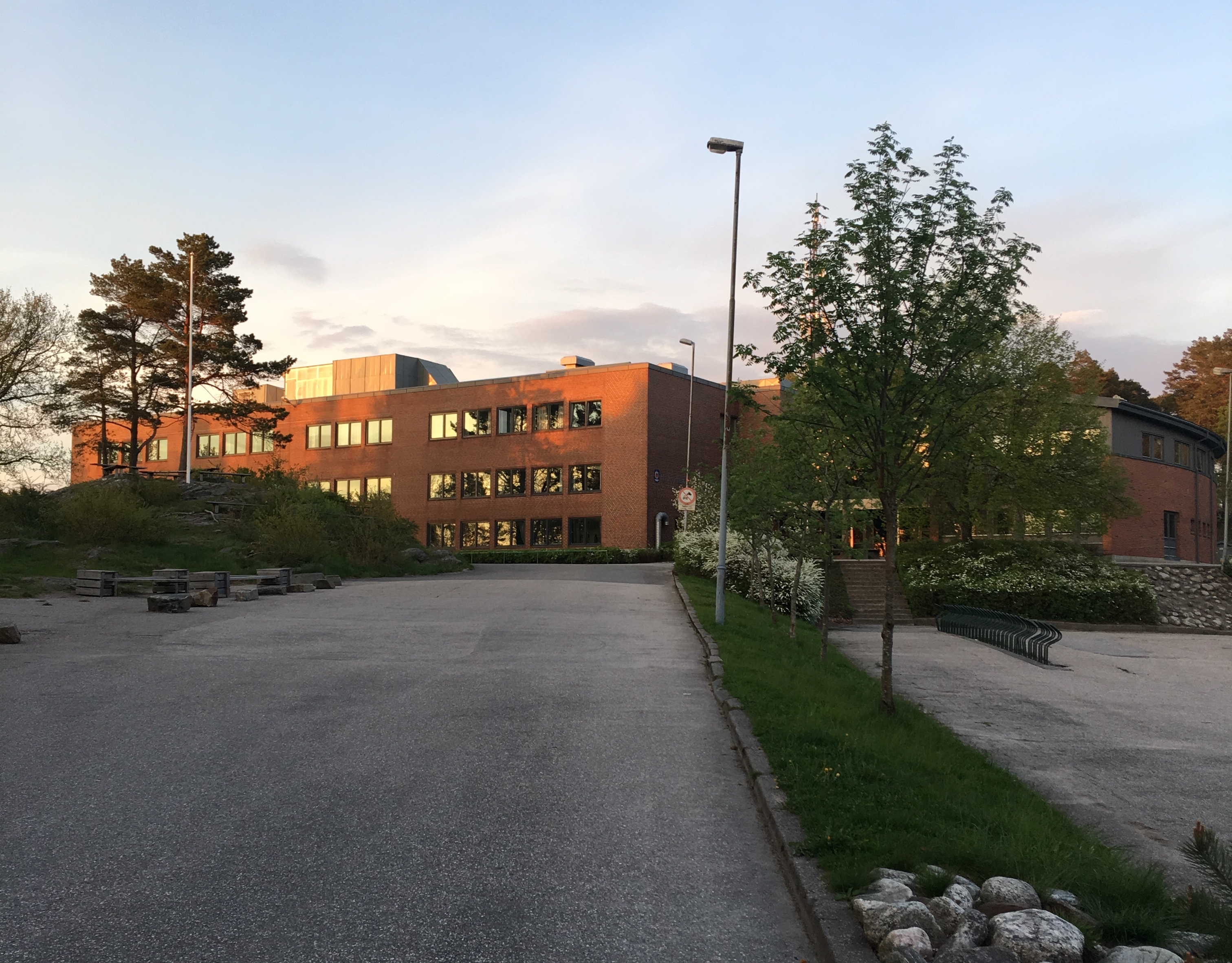
Haumyrheia Junior High

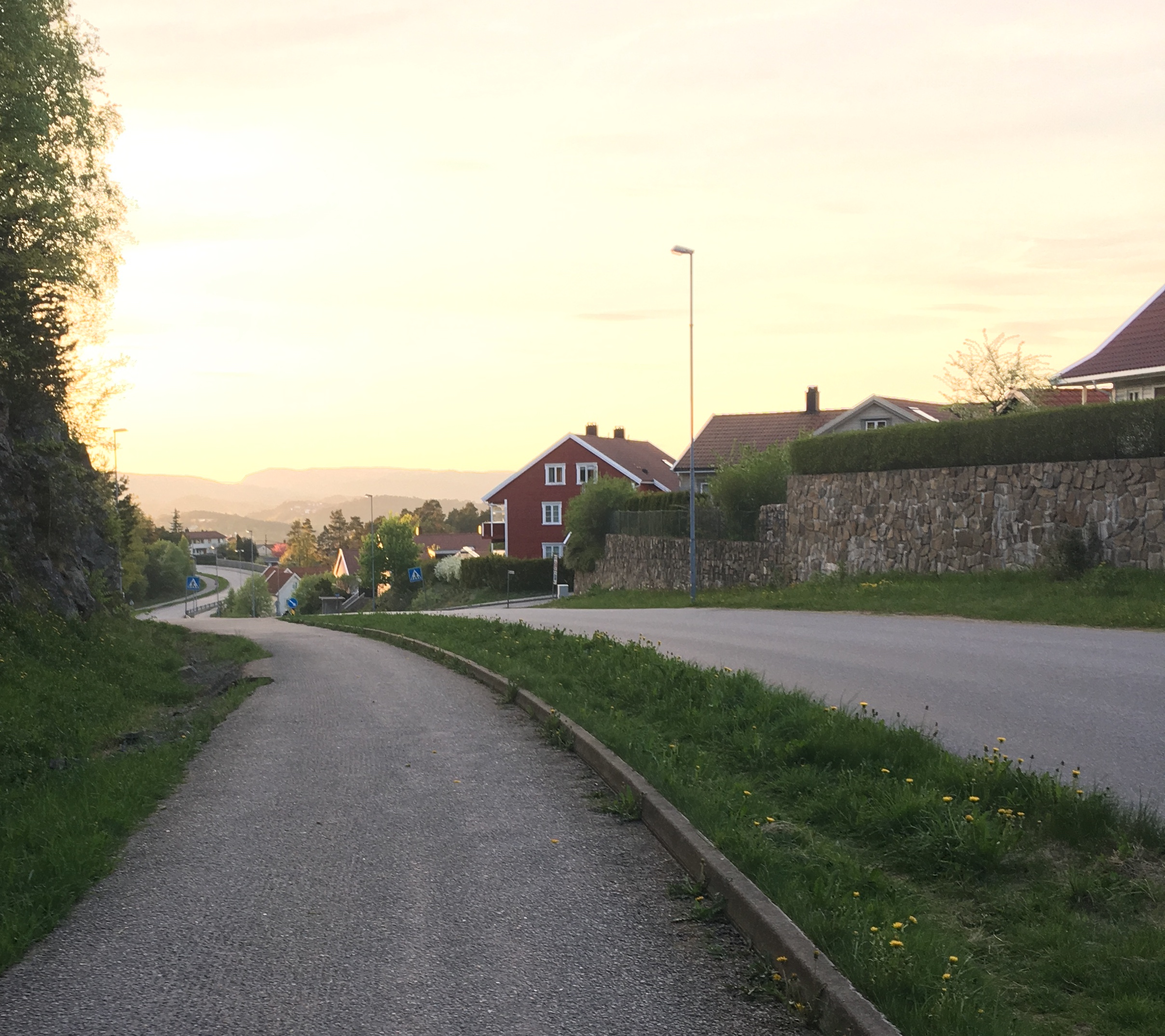
Rødhettes vei
