= Strømme =

- Neighborhood in Kristiansand
- Interactive map of Strømme
- Coordinates: 58.1582°N 08.0801°E
- Country: Norway
- County: Vest-Agder
- Municipality: Kristiansand
- Borough: Oddernes
- District: Søm
- Time zone: UTC+01:00 (CET)
  - Summer (DST): UTC+02:00 (CEST)

Strømme is a neighborhood in the city of Kristiansand in Vest-Agder county, Norway. It is a part of the Oddernes borough and the district of Søm. It is located next to the Rona and Strømsdalen neighborhoods.
