= Varodd Bridge =

Road bridges in Adger county, Norway

New Varodd Bridge Nye Varoddbrua
- Coordinates: 58°10′N 8°04′E

Characteristics
- Design: Cantilever bridge
- Total length: 660 metres (2,170 ft)
- Longest span: 260 metres (850 ft)
- No. of spans: 4
- Clearance below: 32 metres (105 ft)

History
- Opened: 1993

Location
- Interactive map of New Varodd Bridge

Old Varodd Bridge Gamle Varoddbrua
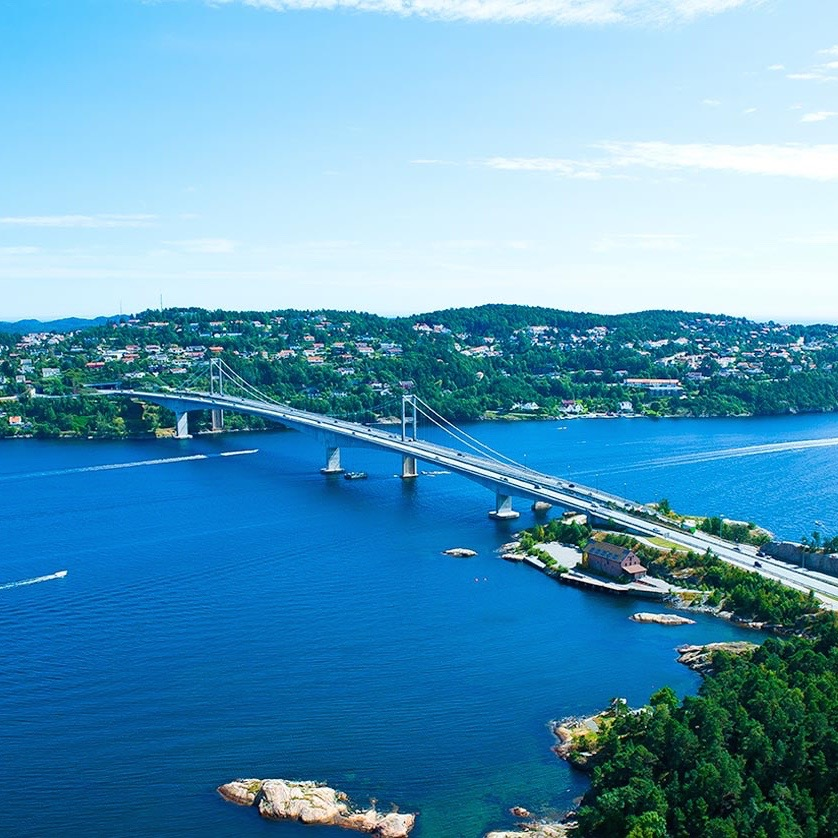
- The new westbound Varodd Bridge with the Old Varodd Bridge still in place in 2015.
- Coordinates: 58°10′N 8°04′E

Characteristics
- Design: Former suspension bridge
- Total length: 618 metres (2,028 ft)
- Height: 70 metres (230 ft)
- Longest span: 337 metres (1,106 ft)
- No. of spans: 8
- Clearance below: 30 metres (98 ft)

History
- Opened: 1956
- Replaced by: The eastbound cantilever bridge (2020)

The Varodd Bridges are two parallel cantilever bridges in Kristiansand Municipality in Agder county, Norway. They cross the Topdalsfjorden on the northeast side of the city of Kristiansand. They are named after the peninsula on the western shore. The bridges carry the European route E18 highway over the fjord from Vige on the northwest end of the bridge to Søm on the southeast end of the bridge.

== Old Bridge ==
The Old Varodd Bridge was a former suspension bridge, which opened in 1956. It was a 618 metres (2,028 ft) long suspension bridge, with a main span of 337 metres (1,106 ft). The two towers reached 70 metres (230 ft) above sea level. Before the completion of the second bridge, this was the only bridge crossing Topdalsfjorden, making it a two-lane bridge carrying traffic in both directions. The replacement bridge was built in between the two current bridges and construction began in early 2017. The suspension bridge was demolished and removed in the fall of 2020.

== New bridges ==
The New Varodd Bridge is parallel to the older bridge, and was completed in 1993 at a cost of US$13 million. It is a cantilever bridge with four spans. The main span is 260 metres (850 ft) and a total length of 663 metres (2,175 ft). The bridge has a 32-metre (105 ft) clearance below it. The bridge was built solely to relieve the traffic on the older bridge, and the two lanes only handled westbound traffic.

Another new cantilever bridge for eastbound traffic was constructed between the old and new Varodd Bridge. It was completed in 2020.

== Gallery ==
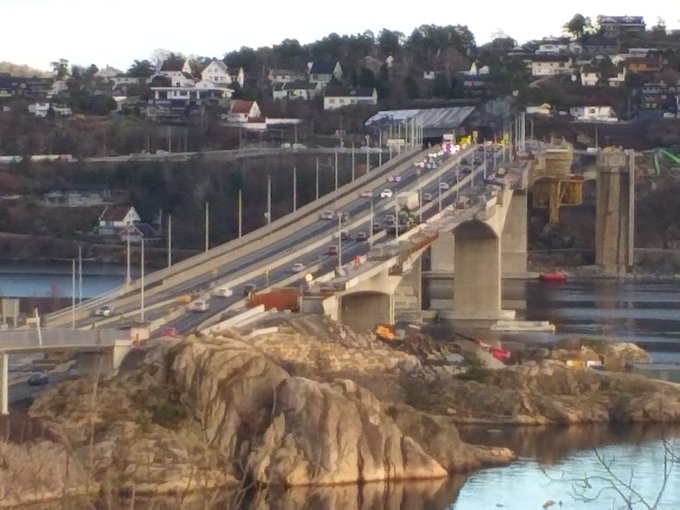
The two parallel cantilever bridges in 2020. The former suspension bridge has been removed.

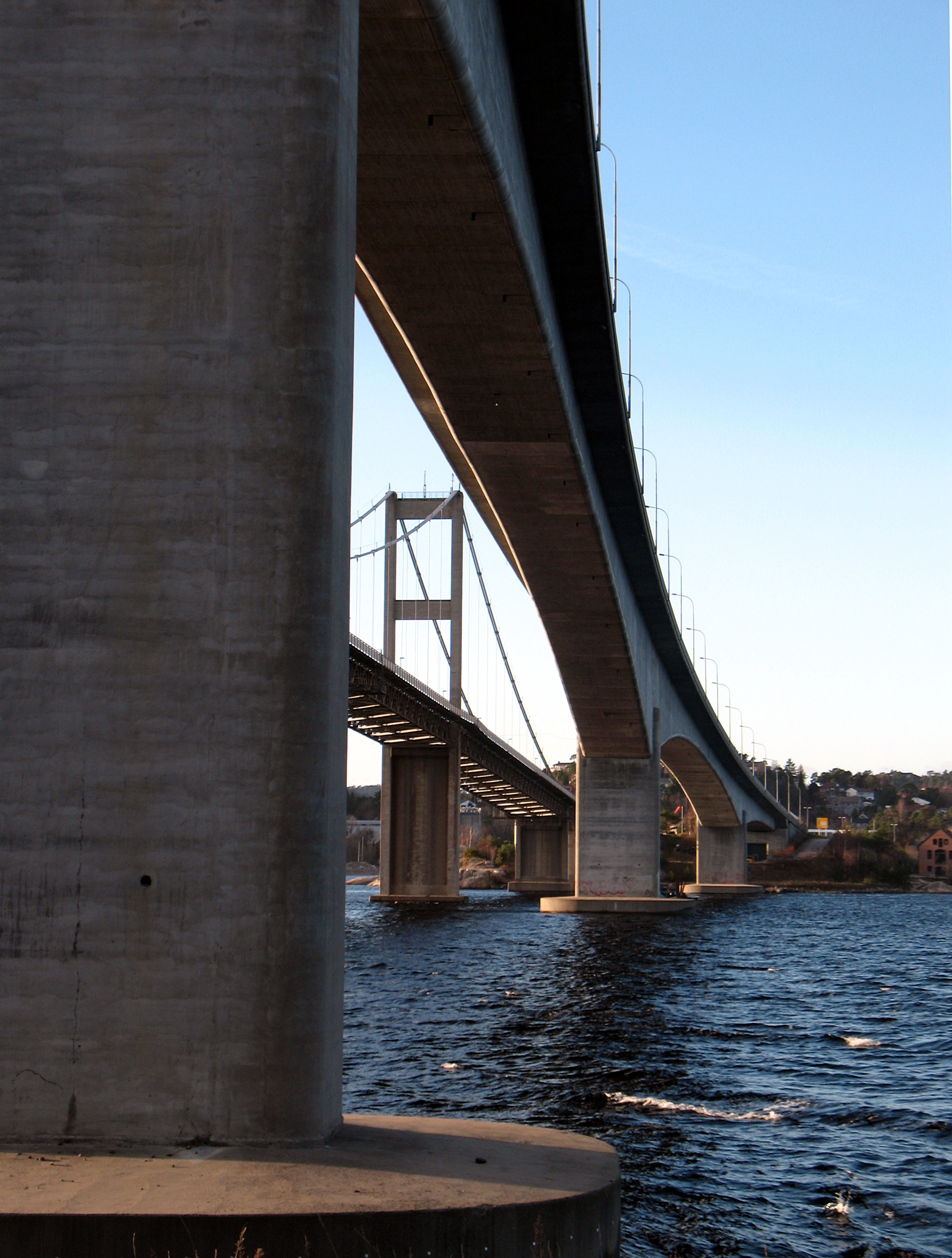
The old suspension bridge on left, the 1993 bridge on right.

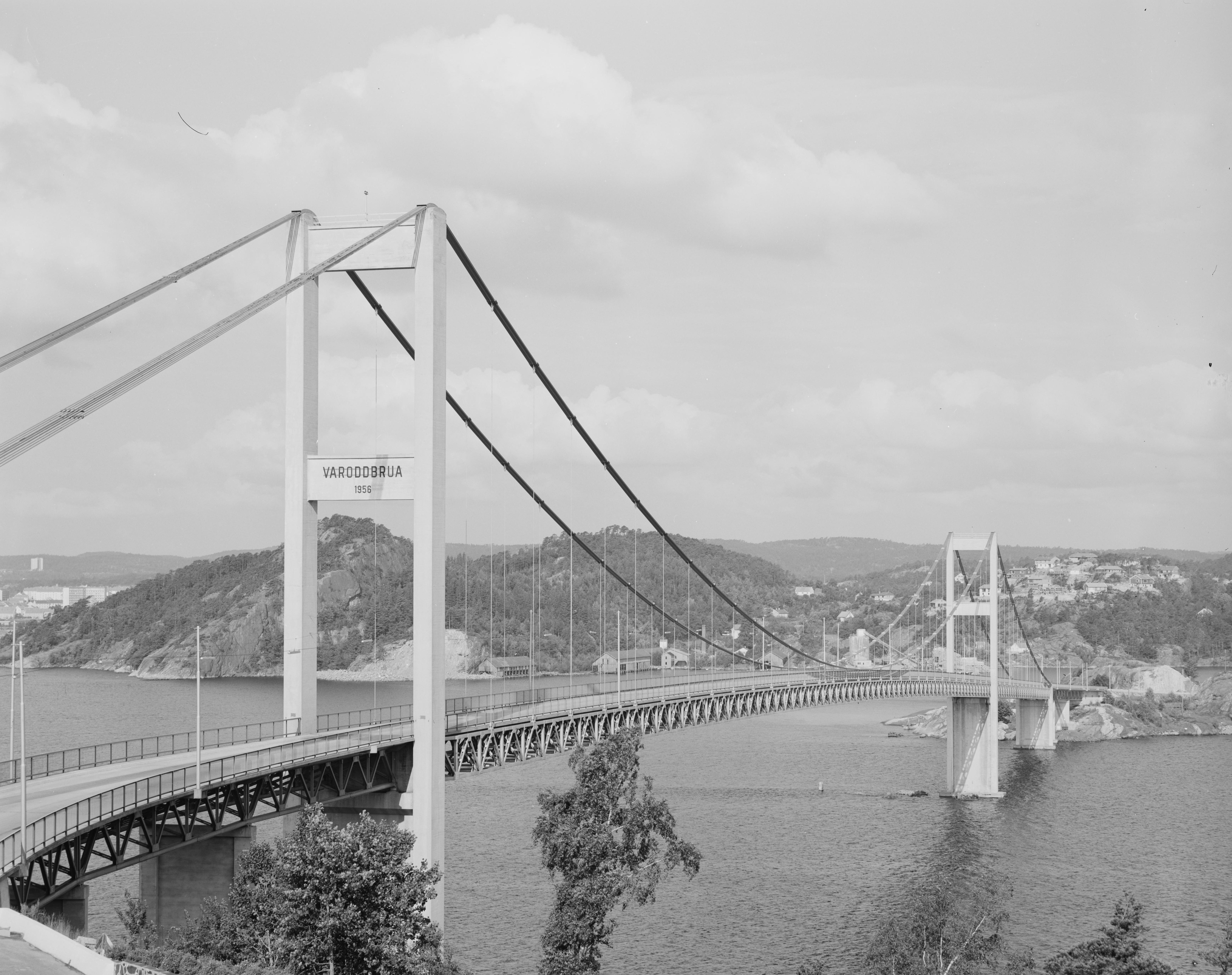
The old Varodd Bridge in 1962.
