= Strømsdalen =

- Neighborhood in Kristiansand
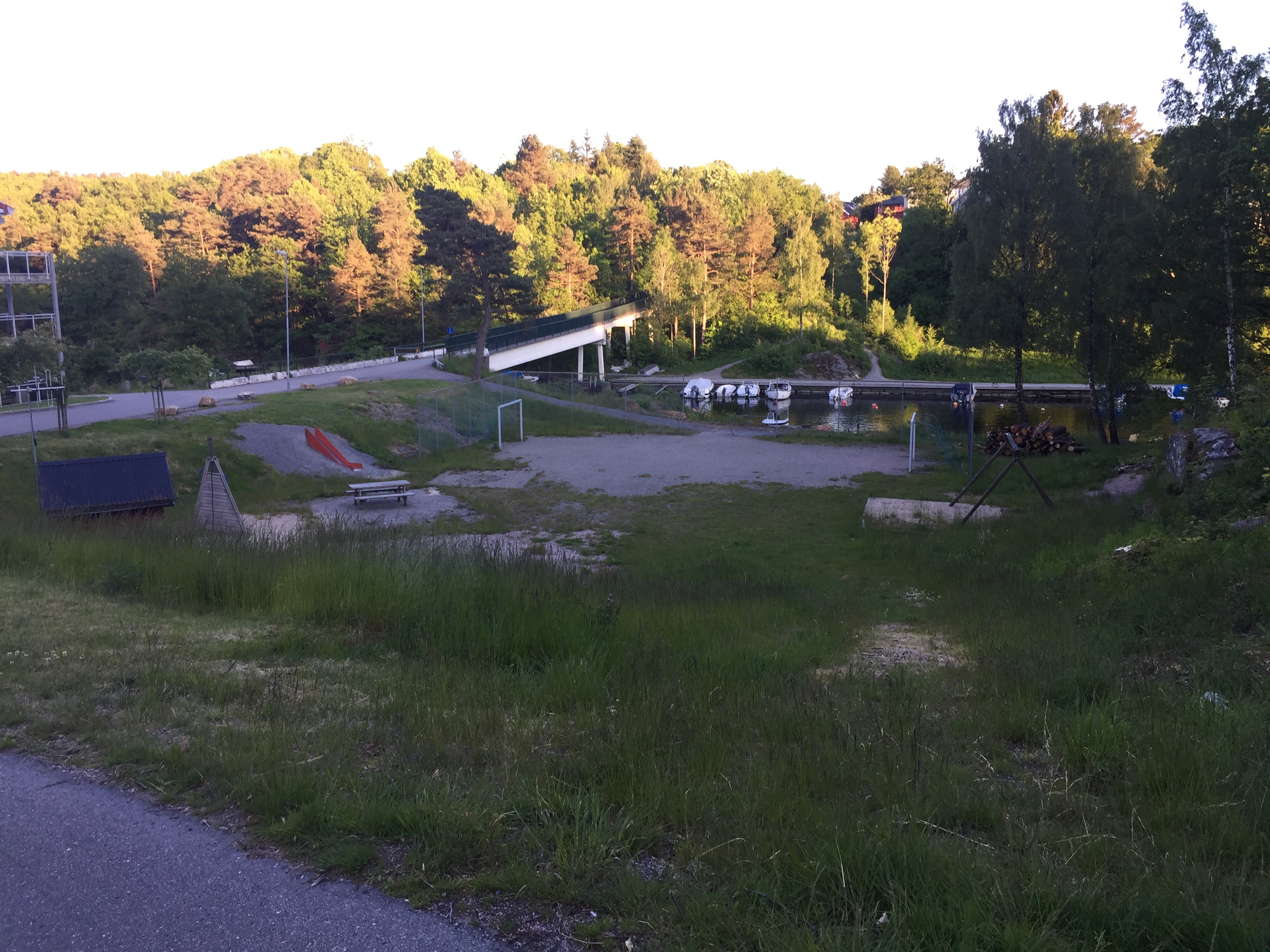
- View of the neighborhood
- Interactive map of Strømsdalen
- Coordinates: 58.16286°N 08.0839°E
- Country: Norway
- County: Agder
- Municipality: Kristiansand
- Borough: Oddernes
- District: Søm
- Elevation: 16 m (52 ft)
- Time zone: UTC+01:00 (CET)
  - Summer (DST): UTC+02:00 (CEST)
- Postal code: 463*
- Area code: 38

Strømsdalen is a neighbourhood in the city of Kristiansand in Agder county, Norway. It is a part of the Oddernes borough and the district of Søm. The neighborhood is next to the European route E18 highway, just southwest of Vigvoll and north of Stromme. The closest school is Strømme Elementary school. All local bus lines bound to Oddernes goes through Strømsdalen. There is a bank and a pizza restaurant at Strømsdalen, other than that Rona is the closest to a centrum.
