= Rona (Kristiansand) =

- Neighborhood in Kristiansand
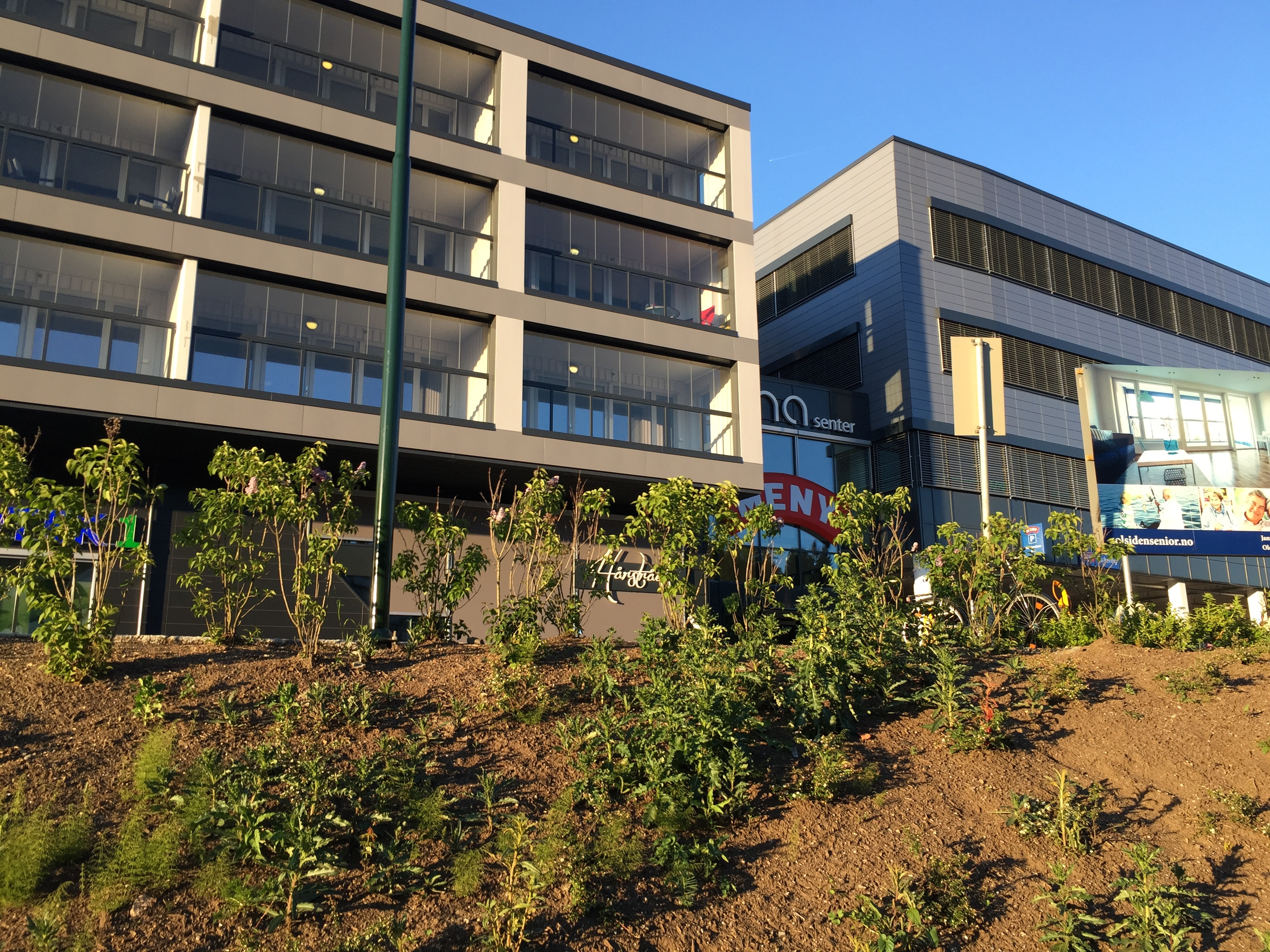
- View of the Rona Mall
- Interactive map of Rona
- Coordinates: 58.1588°N 08.1029°E
- Country: Norway
- County: Agder
- Municipality: Kristiansand
- Borough: Oddernes
- District: Søm
- Elevation: 14 m (46 ft)
- Time zone: UTC+01:00 (CET)
  - Summer (DST): UTC+02:00 (CEST)
- Postal code: 4638
- Area code: 38

Rona is a neighborhood in the city of Kristiansand in Agder county, Norway. It is a part of the Oddernes borough and the district of Søm. The neighbourhood is next to European route E18, and spans the Indre Rona strait between Drangsvatna lake and the Topdalsfjorden. The neighborhood of Strømsdalen lies to the north and Strømme lies to the south. The closest school is Strømme Elementary school. All local bus lines goes through Rona.

Rona mall opened up in 2014 with some stores, a fitness center, and some apartments.
