= Topdalsfjorden =

Fjord in Agder, Norway

- Tovdalsfjorden (historic)
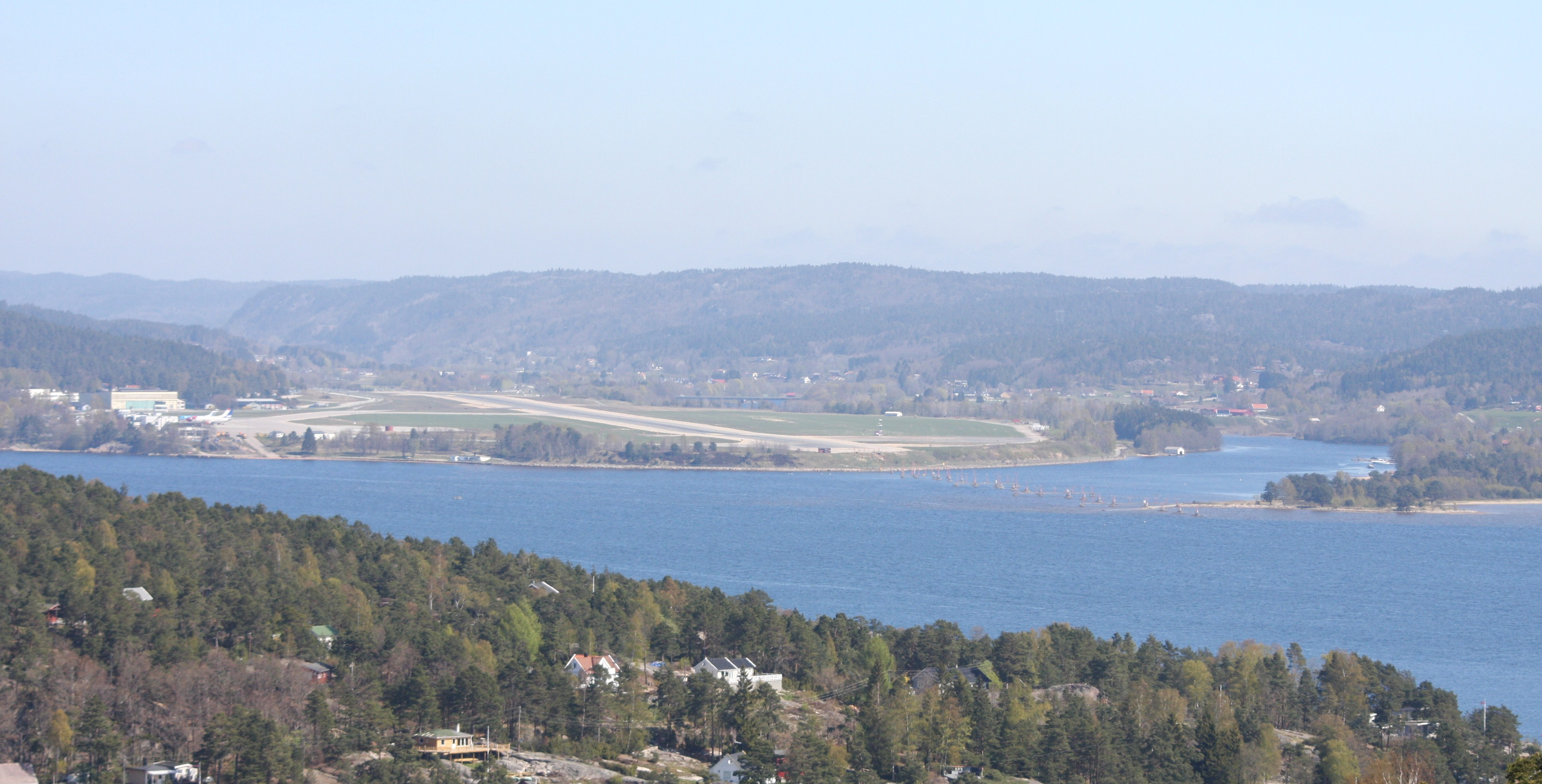
- View of the fjord in Kristiansand
- Interactive map of the fjord
- Location: Agder county, Norway
- Coordinates: 58.1566°N 08.0469°E
- Type: Fjord
- Primary inflows: Tovdalselva
- Primary outflows: Kristiansandsfjorden
- Basin countries: Norway
- Max. length: 12 kilometres (7.5 mi)
- Settlements: Kristiansand

Topdalsfjorden is a fjord in Kristiansand Municipality in Agder county, Norway. The 12-kilometre (7.5 mi) long fjord runs from the village of Ålefjær south to the city centre of Kristiansand. The river Topdalselva empties into the fjord at the eastern side just south of the Kristiansand Airport, Kjevik. The European route E18 highway crosses the fjord on the Varodd Bridge.

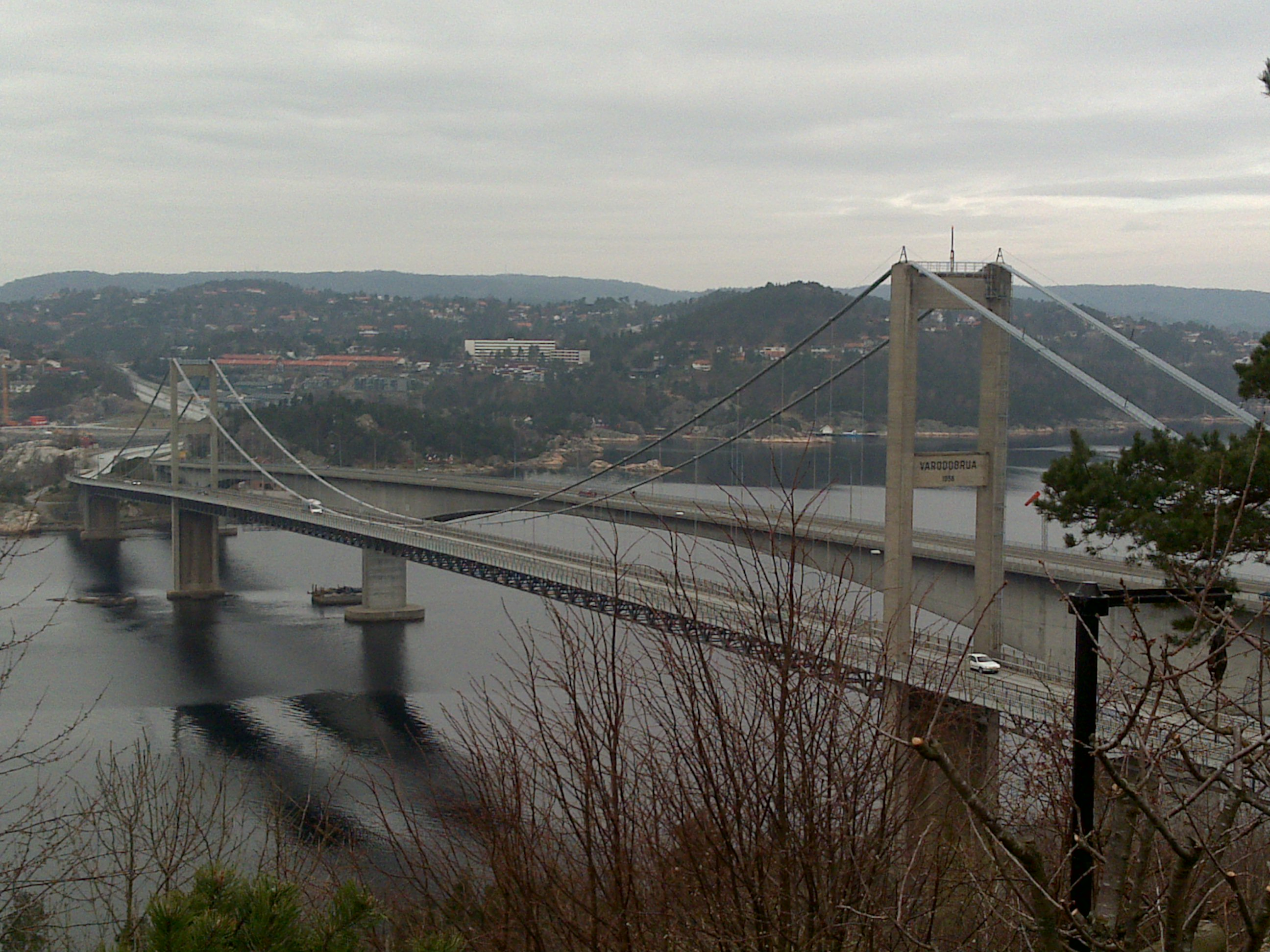
Topdalsfjorden is crossed by the Varodd Bridge.

== See also ==
- List of Norwegian fjords
