= Høvåg =

Høvåg or Høvaag may refer to:

== Places ==
- Høvåg (village), a village in Lillesand Municipality in Agder county, Norway
- Høvåg Church, a church in Lillesand Municipality in Agder county, Norway
- Høvåg Municipality, a former municipality in the old Aust-Agder county, Norway
