= Lillesand =

Lillesand may refer to:

== Places ==
- Lillesand (town), a town within Lillesand Municipality in Agder county, Norway
- Lillesand Municipality, a municipality in Agder county, Norway
- Lillesand Church, a church in Lillesand Municipality in Agder county, Norway

== Sport ==
- Lillesand IL, a sports club based in Lillesand Municipality in Agder county, Norway
