= Ribe, Norway =

Village in Lillesand Municipality, Norway

Ribe
- Village
- Interactive map of Ribe
- Coordinates: 58.1312°N 08.2104°E
- Country: Norway
- Region: Southern Norway
- County: Agder
- Municipality: Lillesand Municipality
- Elevation: 24 m (79 ft)
- Time zone: UTC+01:00 (CET)
  - Summer (DST): UTC+02:00 (CEST)
- Post Code: 4770 Høvåg

Ribe is a village in Lillesand Municipality in Agder county, Norway. The village is located on the east side of the Kvåsefjorden, about 2 kilometres (1.2 mi) north of the village of Ulvøysund and about 5 kilometres (3.1 mi) south of the village of Høvåg. The village of Skotteviga lies about 2 kilometres (1.2 mi) east of Ribe.
