= Trøe =

Village in Lillesand Municipality, Norway

- Village
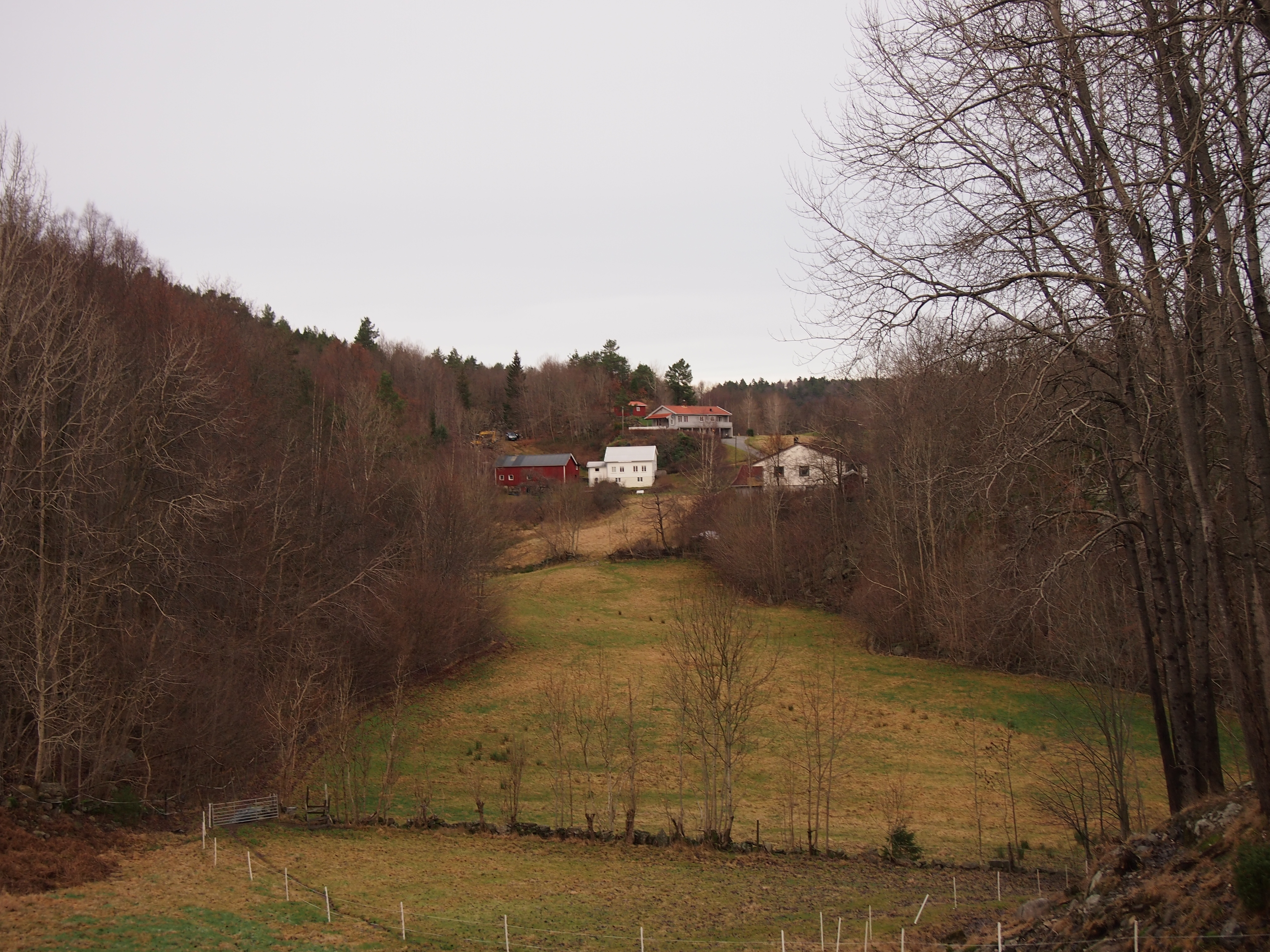
- Interactive map of Trøe
- Coordinates: 58.2099°N 08.2506°E
- Country: Norway
- Region: Southern Norway
- County: Agder
- Municipality: Lillesand Municipality
- Elevation: 21 m (69 ft)
- Time zone: UTC+01:00 (CET)
  - Summer (DST): UTC+02:00 (CEST)
- Post Code: 4790 Lillesand

Trøe is a village in Lillesand Municipality in Agder county, Norway. The village is located along the Norwegian County Road 420 about 5 kilometres (3.1 mi) north of the village of Høvåg and about 10 kilometres (6.2 mi) southwest of the town of Lillesand. The village sits along the head of a bay that flows north from the Blindleia inland waterway.
