= Vesterhus =

Village in Lillesand Municipality, Norway

- Village
- Interactive map of Vesterhus
- Coordinates: 58.1581°N 08.1848°E
- Country: Norway
- Region: Southern Norway
- County: Agder
- Municipality: Lillesand Municipality
- Elevation: 7 m (23 ft)
- Time zone: UTC+01:00 (CET)
  - Summer (DST): UTC+02:00 (CEST)
- Post Code: 4770 Høvåg

Vesterhus is a village in Lillesand Municipality in Agder county, Norway. The village is located at the innermost part of the Kvåsefjorden, about 4 kilometres (2.5 mi) southwest of the village of Høvåg and about 10 kilometres (6.2 mi) east of the city of Kristiansand.
