= Justøya =

Island in Agder, Norway

Justøya Justøy (unofficial)
- Interactive map of the island

Geography
- Location: Agder, Norway
- Coordinates: 58.21326°N 8.35914°E
- Area: 7.9 km^{2} (3.1 sq mi)
- Length: 4 km (2.5 mi)
- Width: 3 km (1.9 mi)

Administration
- Norway
- County: Agder
- Municipality: Lillesand Municipality

Demographics
- Population: 360 (2015)

Justøya is an island in Lillesand Municipality in Agder county, Norway. The 7.9-square-kilometre (3.1 sq mi) island lies just south of the town of Lillesand with the Skagerrak to the east and the Blindleia strait and the mainland to the west. The name comes from Old Norse word Jóstr which means a "stream of ice".

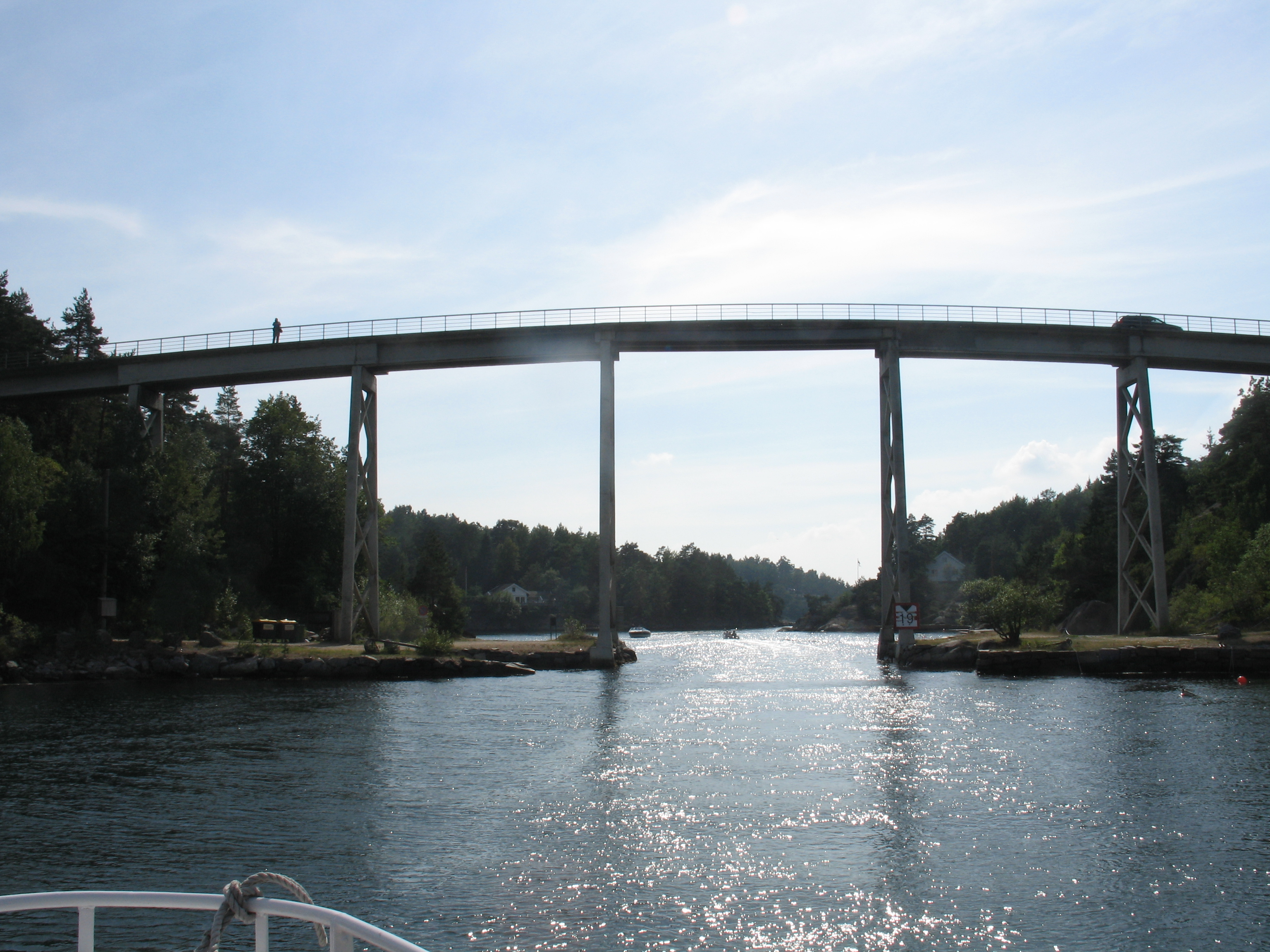
The bridge from the mainland to Justøy over Blindleia

At 7.9 square kilometres (3.1 sq mi), Justøy is one of Agder county's largest islands. Justøya is connected to the mainland by the narrow 116-metre (381 ft) long Justøybrua bridge, built in 1949. There are about 360 residents (in 2015) on the island located in scattered settlements across the island. The old outport, Brekkestø, lies on the south side of the island. The outport is one of the remains from the time of sailing ships in the Skagerrak coast. The island is largely characterized by summer tourism. The island is home to a Montessori school, Justøy Chapel, cemetery, pension boarding house, campsite, and the summer shop in Brekkestø.

In Nyberg, just north of Brekkestø, are the Festung Björkestraße ruins from World War II. The German fortifications and bunkers in Nyberg that were built by Norwegian prisoners of war.

== See also ==
- List of islands of Norway
