= Skotteviga =

Village in Lillesand Municipality, Norway

Skotteviga Skottevik (unofficial)
- Village
- Interactive map of Skotteviga
- Coordinates: 58.1307°N 08.2385°E
- Country: Norway
- Region: Southern Norway
- County: Agder
- Municipality: Lillesand Municipality
- Elevation: 21 m (69 ft)
- Time zone: UTC+01:00 (CET)
  - Summer (DST): UTC+02:00 (CEST)
- Post Code: 4770 Høvåg

Skotteviga is a village in Lillesand Municipality in Agder county, Norway. The village is located on the Skagerrak coast, about 2 kilometres (1.2 mi) east of the village of Ribe and about 3 kilometres (1.9 mi) northeast of the village of Ulvøysund. The outport of Gamle Hellesund lies about 2 kilometres (1.2 mi) to the northeast of Skotteviga in the nearby coastal archipelago.
