= Sundtoft =

Sundtoft is a Norwegian surname. Notable people with the surname include:

- Kristian Sundtoft (1937–2015), Norwegian politician
- Tine Sundtoft (born 1967), Norwegian civil servant and politician
