= Varen =

Varen may refer to:

- Varen, Switzerland, a municipality in the canton of Valais, Switzerland
- Varen, Tarn-et-Garonne, a commune in the Tarn-et-Garonne department, France
- Bernhard Varen
- Daniel Steen Varen
