= Lillesand Municipality =

Municipality in Agder, Norway

Lillesand Municipality Lillesand kommune
- Municipality
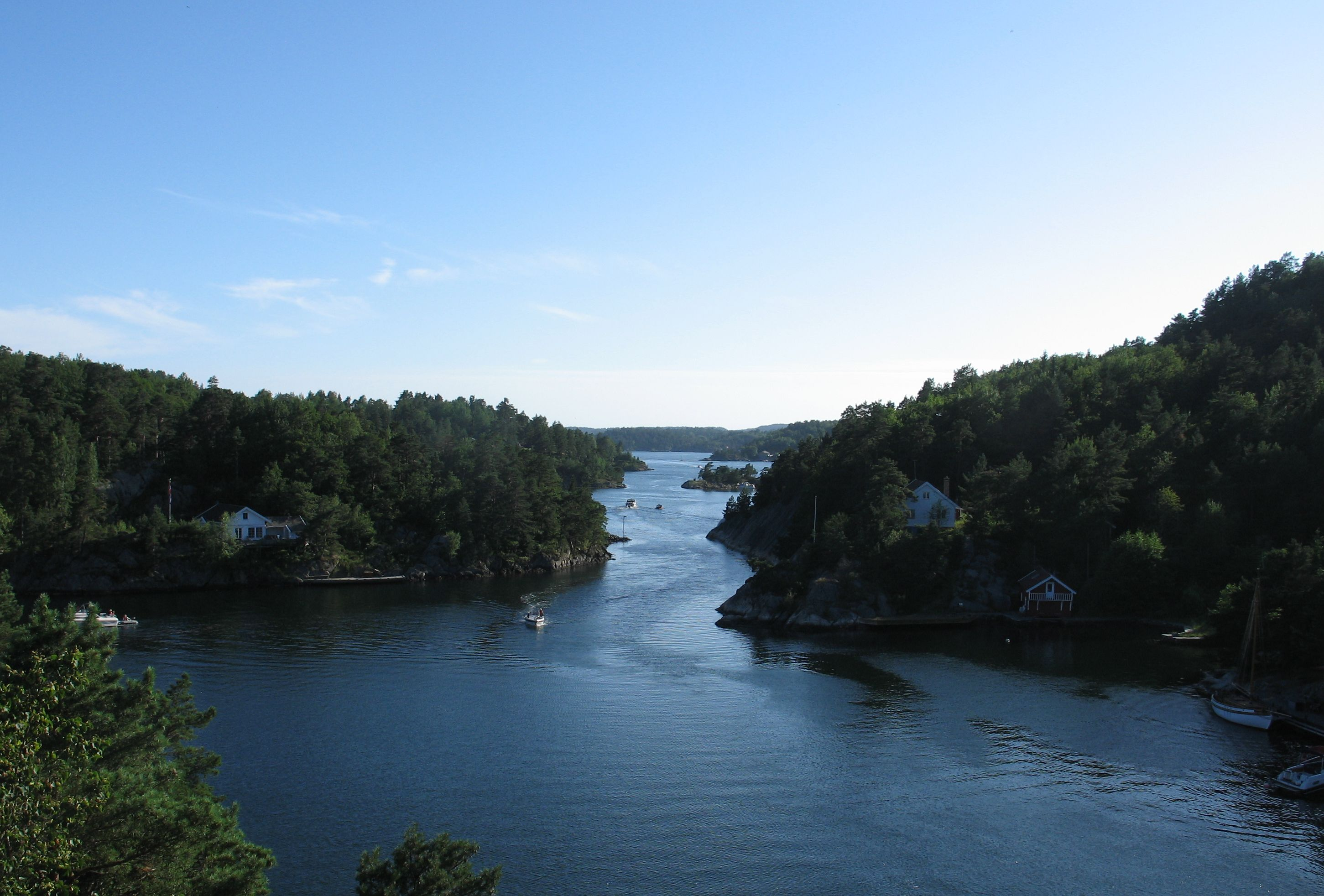
- View of the Blindleia in Lillesand

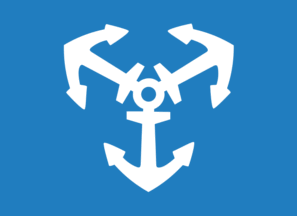
- Flag Coat of arms

- Agder within Norway

- Lillesand within Agder
- Coordinates: 58°14′49″N 08°19′01″E
- Country: Norway
- County: Agder
- District: Sørlandet
- Established: 1 Jan 1838
  - Created as: Formannskapsdistrikt
- Administrative centre: Lillesand

Government
  - Mayor (2019): Einar Holmer-Hoven (H)

Area
  - Total: 190.31 km^{2} (73.48 sq mi)
  - Land: 180.34 km^{2} (69.63 sq mi)
  - Water: 9.97 km^{2} (3.85 sq mi) 5.2%
  - Rank: #306 in Norway
- Highest elevation: 234.83 m (770.4 ft)

Population (2026)
  - Total: 11,822
  - Rank: #99 in Norway
  - Density: 65.6/km^{2} (170/sq mi)
  - Change (10 years): ▲ +11.8%
- Demonym(s): Lillesandar; Lillesander

Official language
  - Norwegian form: Bokmål
- Time zone: UTC+01:00 (CET)
  - Summer (DST): UTC+02:00 (CEST)
- ISO 3166 code: NO-4215
- Website: Official website

Lillesand (Urban East Norwegian: [ˈlɪ̂lːəsɑn]) is municipality in Agder county, Norway. It is part of the traditional district of Sørlandet. The administrative center of the municipality is the town of Lillesand. Some of the larger villages in Lillesand Municipality include Ågerøyhavn, Brekkestø, Gamle Hellesund, Helldal, Høvåg, Møglestu, Ribe, Skotteviga, Trøe, Ulvøysund, and Vesterhus.

The 190.31-square-kilometre (73.48 sq mi) municipality is the 306th largest by area out of the 357 municipalities in Norway. Lillesand Municipality is the 99th most populous municipality in Norway with a population of 11,822. The municipality's population density is 65.6 inhabitants per square kilometre (170/sq mi) and its population has increased by 11.8% over the previous 10-year period.

== General information ==
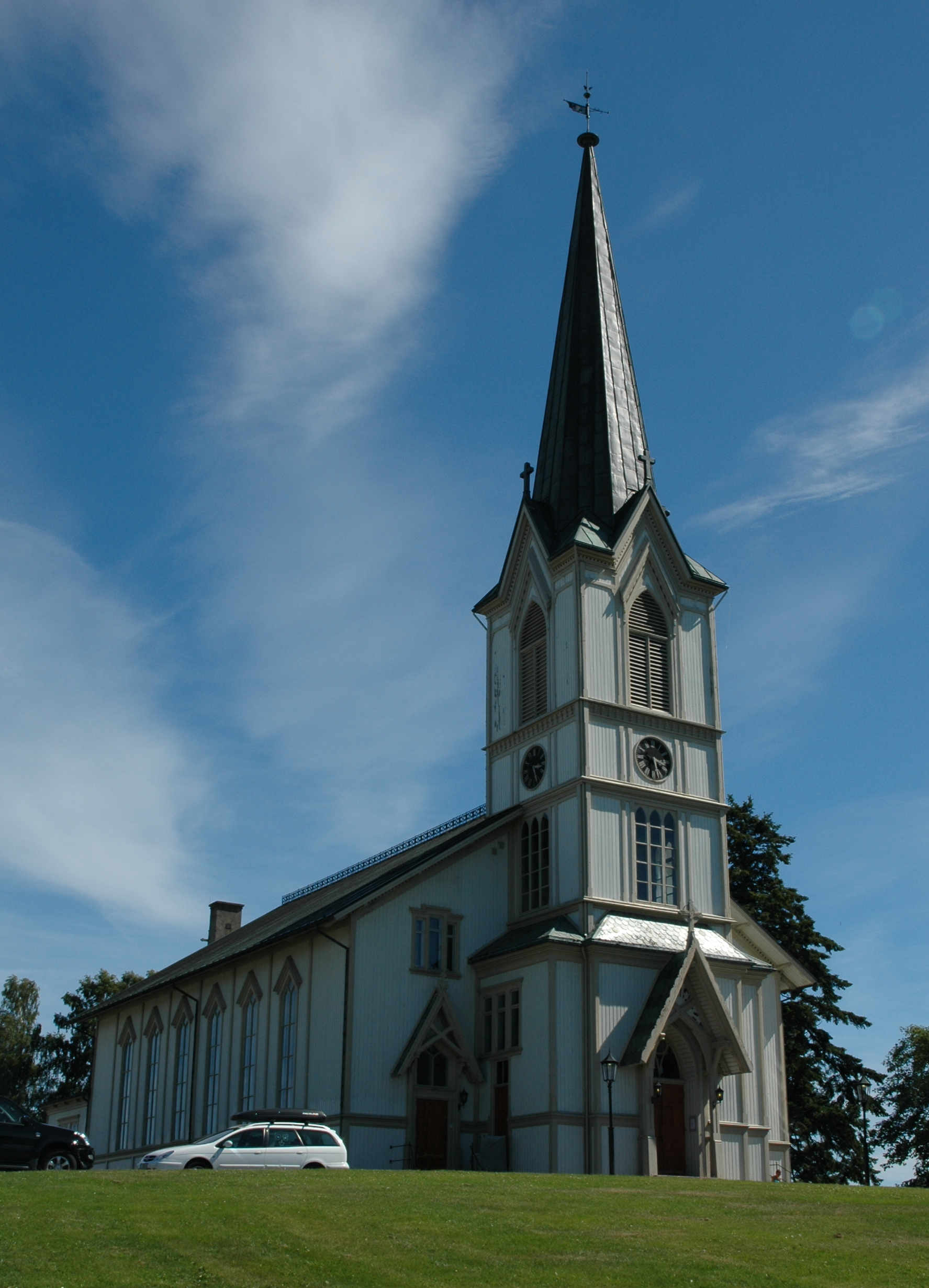
Lillesand Church in the centre of the town

The town of Lillesand was established as a municipality on 1 January 1838 (see formannskapsdistrikt law).

During the 1960s, there were many municipal mergers across Norway due to the work of the Schei Committee. On 1 January 1964, the following areas were merged to form an enlarged Lillesand Municipality:

- all of Lillesand Municipality (population: 1,041)
- all of Høvåg Municipality (population: 1,330)
- all of Vestre Moland Municipality (population: 2,454)
- the Gitmarkgårdene area of Eide Municipality (population: 22)

=== Name ===
The municipality was named after the town of Lillesand, originally just Sand (Old Norse: Sandr). The name is identical to the word sandr which means "sand" or "sandy beach". The prefix is lille, which means "little", was added after the founding of Christianssand in 1641 to distinguish it from the greater and more important town nearby.

=== Coat of arms ===
The coat of arms was granted on 11 September 1987. The official blazon is "Azure, three anchors argent in pall annulets conjoined" (Norwegian: I blått tre sølv ankere forent i trepass). This means the arms have a blue field (background) and the charge is three anchors. The anchors have a tincture of argent which means it is commonly colored white, but if it is made out of metal, then silver is used. The blue color in the field and the anchors were chosen to symbolize the connection that the municipality has with the sea. There are three anchors to symbolize the three smaller municipalities that were merged in 1964 to form the present municipality. The arms were designed by Daniel Rike. The municipal flag has the same design as the coat of arms.

The previous coat of arms for Lillesand was approved on 15 December 1954 and in use until 10 September 1987. The blazon was "Azure, an anchor under a tern volant argent". This means the arms have a blue field (background) and the charge is an anchor with an Arctic tern flying above it. The anchor and tern have a tincture of argent which means it is commonly colored white, but if it is made out of metal, then silver is used. Both symbols refer to the long coastline of the municipality and the importance of fishing and shipping for the local economy. The arms were designed by Jens T. Thommasen and Kjell Westermark Mørch.

Coats of arms of Lillesand

Current coat of arms
(11 Sept 1987–present)

Former coat of arms
(15 Dec 1954–10 Sept 1987)

=== Churches ===
The Church of Norway has two parishes (sokn) within Lillesand Municipality. It is part of the Vest-Nedenes prosti (deanery) in the Diocese of Agder og Telemark.

Churches in Lillesand Municipality
Parish (sokn)	Church name	Location of the church	Year built
Høvåg	Høvåg Church	Høvåg	c. 1100
Lillesand	Lillesand Church	Lillesand	1889
Lillesand	Justøy Chapel	Brekkestø	1884
Lillesand	Vestre Moland Church	Møglestu	c. 1150

== History ==
Sanden, which consisted of the small area near the harbor, was the original name for the town of Lillesand. Lillesand is built on the ancient estate of Lofthus. Christian Jensen Lofthuus was captured on his Lofthus estate around 1780.

In 1821, when Lillesand became a ladested (privileged seaport), it had a population of only 300 and had nine shipyards. By 1895, the merchant fleet was 95 vessels strong. But the death of the sailing ship as we entered the modern shipping era, caused severe economic difficulties for Lillesand. Sailing ships had been inexpensive and could be built from local timber. Steamers were built of steel, were expensive and required more capital than locals could muster. Shipyards were closed. Many of the residents emigrated from there to the United States. Lillesand remained a fishing village, though even this area suffered when the herring left the coast.

The Saltholmen Lighthouse, located on an island off the coast of Lillesand, is a nineteenth century lighthouse with a slate roof and a concrete tower for the light. It operated as a staffed lighthouse from 1882 to 1952. Saltholmen (lit. 'Salty Islet') is named after the salt extraction industry once there, established by Hans Nielsen Hauge.

The Lillesand-Flaksvandbanen railway operated between Lillesand and Flaksvann from 1896 to 1953.

ORP Orzeł, a Polish submarine, sank the German troopship Rio de Janeiro on 8 April 1940 off Lillesand. Rio de Janeiro was on its way to take part in the initial landings of Operation Weserübung the next day, the invasion of Norway.

== Geography ==
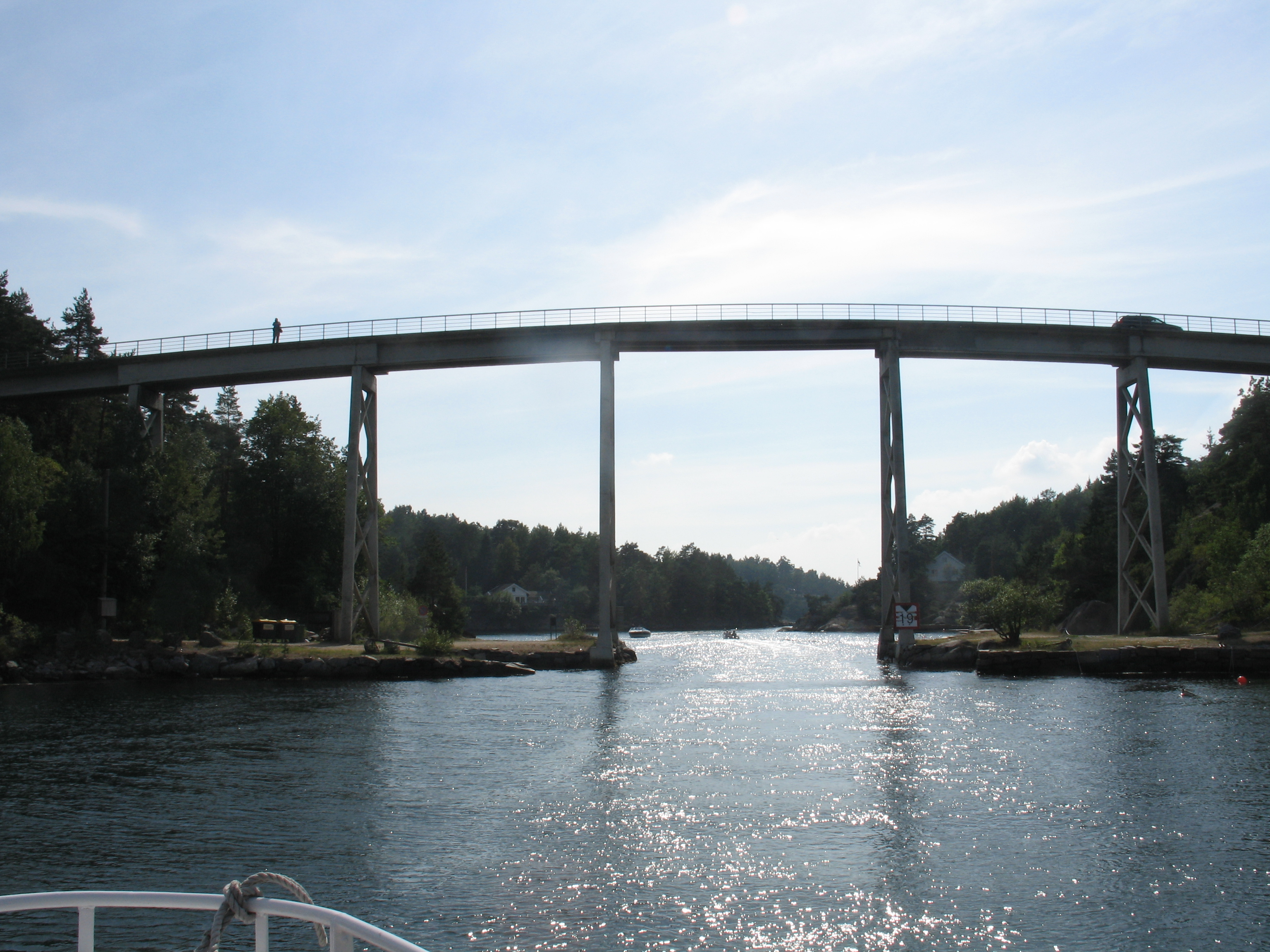
Justøy Bridge over Blindleia in Lillesand.

Lillesand Municipality is bordered in the north by Birkenes Municipality, to the east by Grimstad Municipality, and to the south by Kristiansand Municipality. The lake Austre Grimevannet is a large lake in the northern part of the municipality and the river Tovdalselva runs through the municipality, too. The island of Justøya lies just south of the town of Lillesand, along the Blindleia. The Kvåsefjorden lies along the southwestern border of Lillesand Municipality. The highest point in the municipality is the 234.83-metre (770.4 ft) tall mountain Hisåsen, located on the northern border with Grimstad Municipality.

The Blindleia is an inland waterway that starts in Gamle Hellesund near the border with Kristiansand Municipality and continues just past the town of Lillesand. It is a salt water passage protected from the open sea by the offshore archipelago. Navigation through the Blindleia passage requires attention to detail, but is not difficult as there are no tides, and very little current. The minimal tidal change in the skerries is due to its geographical location; the tidal flow that comes in from the Atlantic Ocean splits on the British Isles. One tidal stream goes through the English Channel, while the other goes around the north of the British Isles. The stream of the English Channel reaches the coast of Norway before the wave traveling around the British Islands. These two tidal "waves" are completely out of phase when they meet here, neutralizing the tidal effect.

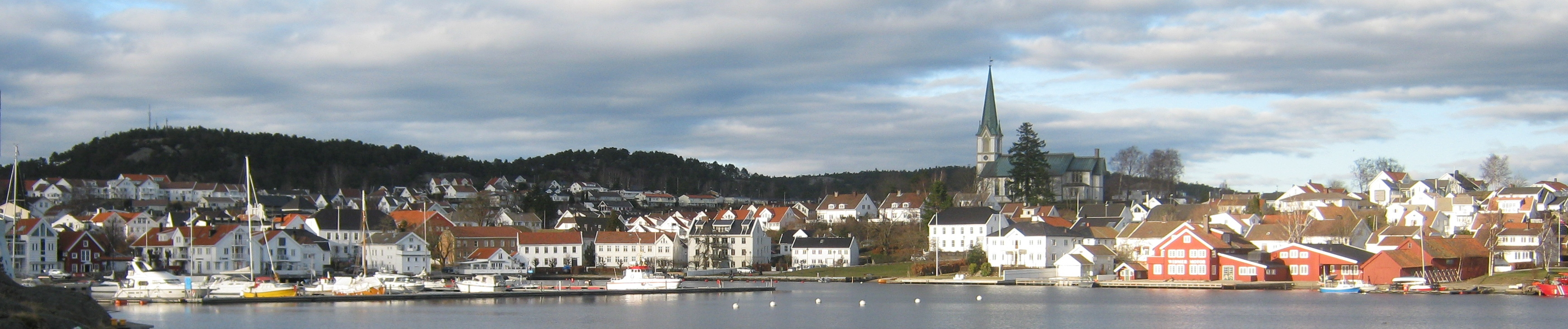
Lillesand's Waterfront

== Government ==
Lillesand Municipality is responsible for primary education (through 10th grade), outpatient health services, senior citizen services, welfare and other social services, zoning, economic development, and municipal roads and utilities. The municipality is governed by a municipal council of directly elected representatives. The mayor is indirectly elected by a vote of the municipal council. The municipality is under the jurisdiction of the Agder District Court and the Agder Court of Appeal.

=== Municipal council ===
The municipal council (Kommunestyre) of Lillesand Municipality is made up of 27 representatives that are elected to four year terms. The tables below show the current and historical composition of the council by political party.

Lillesand kommunestyre 2023–2027
Party name (in Norwegian)	Number of representatives
Labour Party (Arbeiderpartiet)	5
Progress Party (Fremskrittspartiet)	3
Green Party (Miljøpartiet De Grønne)	1
Conservative Party (Høyre)	8
Christian Democratic Party (Kristelig Folkeparti)	2
Pensioners' Party (Pensjonistpartiet)	3
Red Party (Rødt)	1
Centre Party (Senterpartiet)	1
Socialist Left Party (Sosialistisk Venstreparti)	2
Liberal Party (Venstre)	1
Total number of members:	27

Lillesand kommunestyre 2019–2023
Party name (in Norwegian)	Number of representatives
Labour Party (Arbeiderpartiet)	6
Progress Party (Fremskrittspartiet)	2
Green Party (Miljøpartiet De Grønne)	1
Conservative Party (Høyre)	8
Christian Democratic Party (Kristelig Folkeparti)	2
Pensioners' Party (Pensjonistpartiet)	2
Centre Party (Senterpartiet)	2
Socialist Left Party (Sosialistisk Venstreparti)	2
Liberal Party (Venstre)	2
Total number of members:	27

Lillesand kommunestyre 2015–2019
Party name (in Norwegian)	Number of representatives
Labour Party (Arbeiderpartiet)	6
Progress Party (Fremskrittspartiet)	2
Green Party (Miljøpartiet De Grønne)	1
Conservative Party (Høyre)	10
Christian Democratic Party (Kristelig Folkeparti)	2
Pensioners' Party (Pensjonistpartiet)	2
Centre Party (Senterpartiet)	1
Socialist Left Party (Sosialistisk Venstreparti)	1
Liberal Party (Venstre)	2
Total number of members:	27

Lillesand kommunestyre 2011–2015
Party name (in Norwegian)	Number of representatives
Labour Party (Arbeiderpartiet)	5
Progress Party (Fremskrittspartiet)	2
Conservative Party (Høyre)	13
Christian Democratic Party (Kristelig Folkeparti)	2
Pensioners' Party (Pensjonistpartiet)	1
Centre Party (Senterpartiet)	1
Socialist Left Party (Sosialistisk Venstreparti)	1
Liberal Party (Venstre)	2
Total number of members:	27

Lillesand kommunestyre 2007–2011
Party name (in Norwegian)	Number of representatives
Labour Party (Arbeiderpartiet)	4
Progress Party (Fremskrittspartiet)	4
Conservative Party (Høyre)	13
Christian Democratic Party (Kristelig Folkeparti)	3
Centre Party (Senterpartiet)	1
Socialist Left Party (Sosialistisk Venstreparti)	2
Liberal Party (Venstre)	2
Total number of members:	29

Lillesand kommunestyre 2003–2007
Party name (in Norwegian)	Number of representatives
Labour Party (Arbeiderpartiet)	5
Progress Party (Fremskrittspartiet)	4
Conservative Party (Høyre)	7
Christian Democratic Party (Kristelig Folkeparti)	4
Centre Party (Senterpartiet)	2
Socialist Left Party (Sosialistisk Venstreparti)	5
Liberal Party (Venstre)	2
Total number of members:	29

Lillesand kommunestyre 1999–2003
Party name (in Norwegian)	Number of representatives
Labour Party (Arbeiderpartiet)	6
Progress Party (Fremskrittspartiet)	2
Conservative Party (Høyre)	8
Christian Democratic Party (Kristelig Folkeparti)	5
Centre Party (Senterpartiet)	1
Socialist Left Party (Sosialistisk Venstreparti)	4
Liberal Party (Venstre)	3
Total number of members:	29

Lillesand kommunestyre 1995–1999
Party name (in Norwegian)	Number of representatives
Labour Party (Arbeiderpartiet)	6
Conservative Party (Høyre)	9
Christian Democratic Party (Kristelig Folkeparti)	3
Pensioners' Party (Pensjonistpartiet)	3
Centre Party (Senterpartiet)	2
Socialist Left Party (Sosialistisk Venstreparti)	3
Liberal Party (Venstre)	3
Total number of members:	29

Lillesand kommunestyre 1991–1995
Party name (in Norwegian)	Number of representatives
Labour Party (Arbeiderpartiet)	5
Progress Party (Fremskrittspartiet)	2
Conservative Party (Høyre)	8
Christian Democratic Party (Kristelig Folkeparti)	3
Pensioners' Party (Pensjonistpartiet)	2
Centre Party (Senterpartiet)	2
Socialist Left Party (Sosialistisk Venstreparti)	4
Liberal Party (Venstre)	3
Total number of members:	29

Lillesand kommunestyre 1987–1991
Party name (in Norwegian)	Number of representatives
Labour Party (Arbeiderpartiet)	7
Progress Party (Fremskrittspartiet)	3
Conservative Party (Høyre)	9
Christian Democratic Party (Kristelig Folkeparti)	4
Centre Party (Senterpartiet)	1
Socialist Left Party (Sosialistisk Venstreparti)	2
Liberal Party (Venstre)	3
Total number of members:	29

Lillesand kommunestyre 1983–1987
Party name (in Norwegian)	Number of representatives
Labour Party (Arbeiderpartiet)	7
Progress Party (Fremskrittspartiet)	3
Conservative Party (Høyre)	10
Christian Democratic Party (Kristelig Folkeparti)	4
Centre Party (Senterpartiet)	1
Socialist Left Party (Sosialistisk Venstreparti)	2
Liberal Party (Venstre)	2
Total number of members:	29

Lillesand kommunestyre 1979–1983
Party name (in Norwegian)	Number of representatives
Labour Party (Arbeiderpartiet)	6
Progress Party (Fremskrittspartiet)	1
Conservative Party (Høyre)	12
Christian Democratic Party (Kristelig Folkeparti)	5
Centre Party (Senterpartiet)	2
Socialist Left Party (Sosialistisk Venstreparti)	1
Liberal Party (Venstre)	2
Total number of members:	29

Lillesand kommunestyre 1975–1979
Party name (in Norwegian)	Number of representatives
Labour Party (Arbeiderpartiet)	6
Conservative Party (Høyre)	10
Christian Democratic Party (Kristelig Folkeparti)	6
New People's Party (Nye Folkepartiet)	1
Centre Party (Senterpartiet)	3
Socialist Left Party (Sosialistisk Venstreparti)	1
Liberal Party (Venstre)	2
Total number of members:	29

Lillesand kommunestyre 1971–1975
Party name (in Norwegian)	Number of representatives
Labour Party (Arbeiderpartiet)	8
Conservative Party (Høyre)	8
Christian Democratic Party (Kristelig Folkeparti)	4
Centre Party (Senterpartiet)	4
Liberal Party (Venstre)	5
Total number of members:	29

Lillesand kommunestyre 1967–1971
Party name (in Norwegian)	Number of representatives
Labour Party (Arbeiderpartiet)	8
Conservative Party (Høyre)	8
Christian Democratic Party (Kristelig Folkeparti)	4
Centre Party (Senterpartiet)	3
Liberal Party (Venstre)	6
Total number of members:	29

Lillesand kommunestyre 1963–1967
Party name (in Norwegian)	Number of representatives
Labour Party (Arbeiderpartiet)	8
Conservative Party (Høyre)	8
Christian Democratic Party (Kristelig Folkeparti)	3
Centre Party (Senterpartiet)	2
Liberal Party (Venstre)	8
Total number of members:	29

Lillesand bystyre 1959–1963
Party name (in Norwegian)	Number of representatives
Labour Party (Arbeiderpartiet)	3
Conservative Party (Høyre)	8
Christian Democratic Party (Kristelig Folkeparti)	4
Liberal Party (Venstre)	6
Total number of members:	21

Lillesand bystyre 1955–1959
Party name (in Norwegian)	Number of representatives
Labour Party (Arbeiderpartiet)	3
Conservative Party (Høyre)	8
Christian Democratic Party (Kristelig Folkeparti)	4
Liberal Party (Venstre)	6
Total number of members:	21

Lillesand bystyre 1951–1955
Party name (in Norwegian)	Number of representatives
Labour Party (Arbeiderpartiet)	3
Conservative Party (Høyre)	7
Christian Democratic Party (Kristelig Folkeparti)	3
Liberal Party (Venstre)	7
Total number of members:	20

Lillesand bystyre 1947–1951
Party name (in Norwegian)	Number of representatives
Labour Party (Arbeiderpartiet)	3
Conservative Party (Høyre)	5
Christian Democratic Party (Kristelig Folkeparti)	5
Liberal Party (Venstre)	7
Total number of members:	20

Lillesand bystyre 1945–1947
Party name (in Norwegian)	Number of representatives
Labour Party (Arbeiderpartiet)	2
Conservative Party (Høyre)	5
Christian Democratic Party (Kristelig Folkeparti)	5
Liberal Party (Venstre)	8
Total number of members:	20

Lillesand bystyre 1937–1941*
Party name (in Norwegian)	Number of representatives
Labour Party (Arbeiderpartiet)	1
Conservative Party (Høyre)	7
Liberal Party (Venstre)	12
Total number of members:	20
Note: Due to the German occupation of Norway during World War II, no elections were held for new municipal councils until after the war ended in 1945.

Lillesand bystyre 1934–1937
Party name (in Norwegian)	Number of representatives
Labour Party (Arbeiderpartiet)	1
Conservative Party (Høyre)	7
Liberal Party (Venstre)	12
Total number of members:	20

=== Mayors ===
The mayor (Norwegian: ordfører) of Lillesand Municipality is the political leader of the municipality and the chairperson of the municipal council. The following people have held this position:

- 1838–1843: Lars Hammer, Sr.
- 1844–1864: Carsten Due
- 1865–1869: H.J. Hammer
- 1870–1880: Jacob Svendsen
- 1881–1883: Theodor Nielsen
- 1884–1885: Jacob Svendsen (H)
- 1886–1886: Theodor Nielsen (H)
- 1887–1887: Jacob Svendsen (H)
- 1888–1888: Nils Sørensen Gauslaa (V)
- 1889–1895: Gerhard Krog (H)
- 1896–1897: Wilhelm Scharffenberg (H)
- 1898–1898: Henrik Hansen (H)
- 1899–1900: Wilhelm Scharffenberg (H)
- 1901–1901: Henrik Hansen (H)
- 1902–1903: Andreas Nicolai Grønn (H)
- 1904–1904: Henrik Hansen (H)
- 1905–1905: Carl Knudsen (H)
- 1906–1906: P. Ydalus Jahnsen (H)
- 1907–1937: Noan Christian Gauslaa (V)
- 1938–1941: Henrik Rønnevig (V)
- 1941–1941: Christian Hansen (NS)
- 1941–1945: Dr. Fridtjof Fossum (NS)
- 1945–1945: Henrik Rønnevig (V)
- 1946–1951: Kristoffer Knudsen (KrF)
- 1952–1955: Ole Grimnes (H)
- 1956–1957: Sigurd Aanonsen (H)
- 1958–1961: Kjell Rosenberg (V)
- 1962–1963: Birger Gauslaa (V)
- 1964–1967: Daniel Steen Varen (V)
- 1968–1973: Håkon A. Østberg (H)
- 1974–1975: Eigil Bjørk Knudsen (KrF)
- 1976–1983: Bjørgulf Aune (H)
- 1984–1987: Kristian Sundtoft (H)
- 1988–1991: Gunnar Oftedahl (H)
- 1992–1995: Ragnhild Omdal Mollatt (H)
- 1995–1999: Kristian Sundtoft (H)
- 1999–2003: Odd Steindal (H)
- 2003–2019: Arne Thomassen (H)
- 2019–present: Einar Holmer-Hoven (H)

== Attractions ==
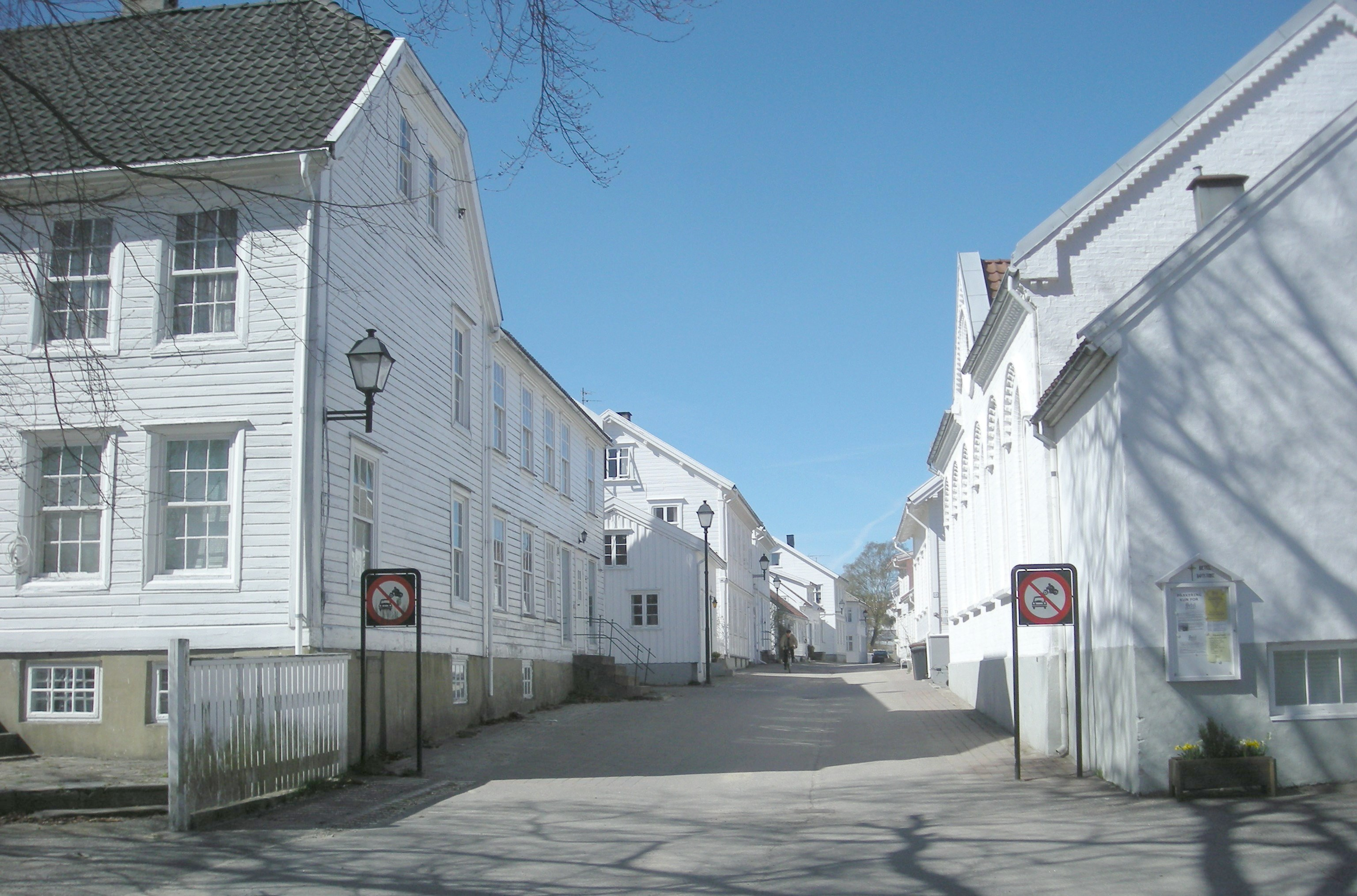
Øvre gate with white wooden houses in the town center of Lillesand

The Skjærgårdsparken lies between Risør and Lillesand. Skjærgårdsparken, "the Park of Archipelago" is a paradise of islands, skerries, and rocks. Blindleia is a 12-kilometre (7.5 mi) long inland waterway between Lillesand and Ulvøysund with a lot of small boat traffic during the summer. The village of Brekkestø is a tourist area on the island of Justøya.

Lillesand Town- and Maritime Museum is a local, culture historic museum, located in the centre of the town. The museum is also called Carl Knudsen-gården.

The Norwegian author Jostein Gaarder refers to this town in several of his books, for example in Sophie's World, where The Solitaire Mystery refers to Lillesand.

=== Churches ===
Lillesand Church is a wooden church which was built in 1887–1889 in Gothic Revival/Swiss style. The architect was Henrik Thrap-Meyer who also designed the pulpit, altarpiece and baptismal font. The altarpiece was done by Abraham Tønnessen. Lillesand Church is perched high above the city on a hill at Kirkeheia.

Lillesand Municipality also has two medieval stone churches: Vestre Moland Church and Høvåg Church, both of which are listed cultural heritage sites.

== Notable people ==
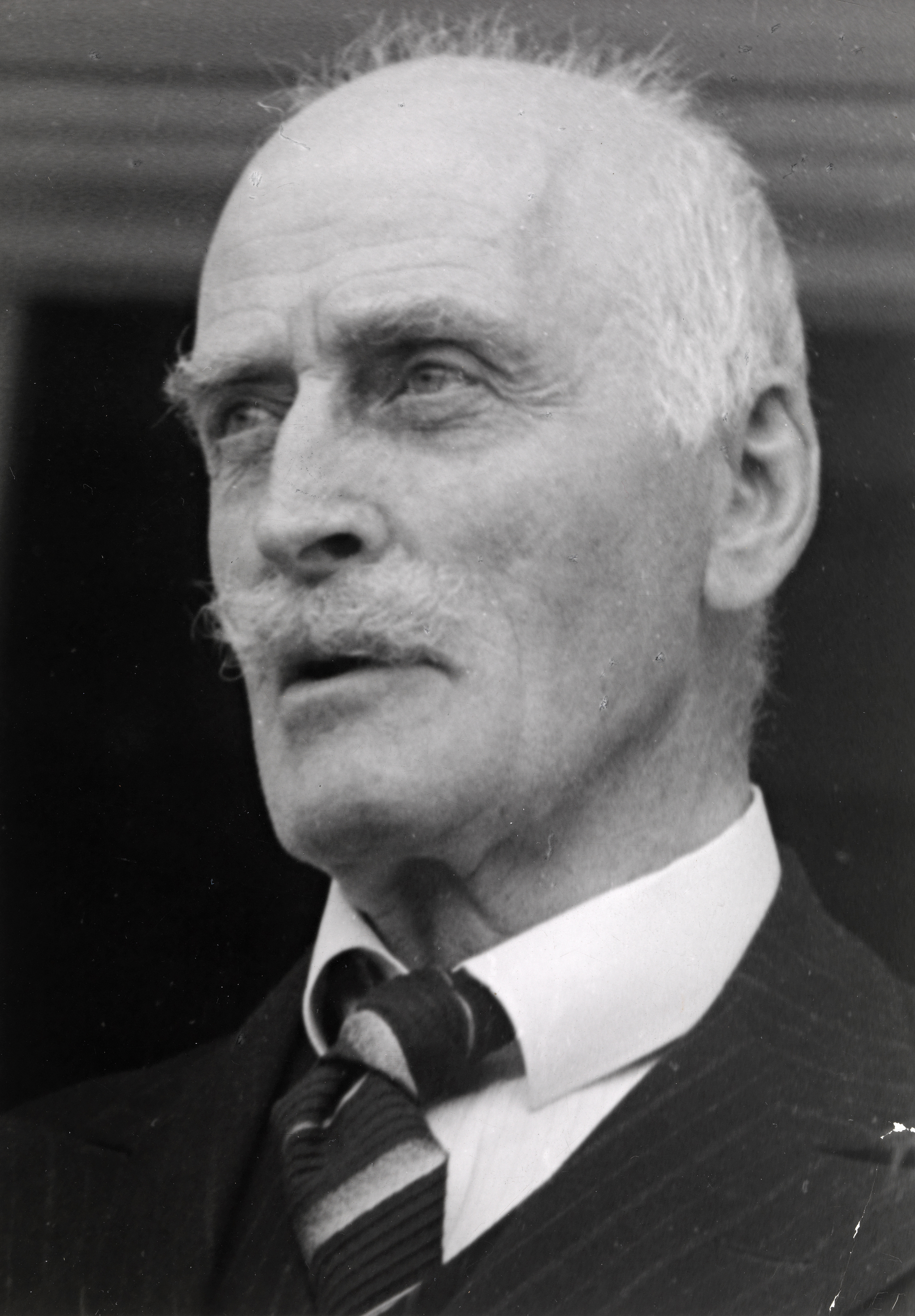
Knut Hamsun, 1939

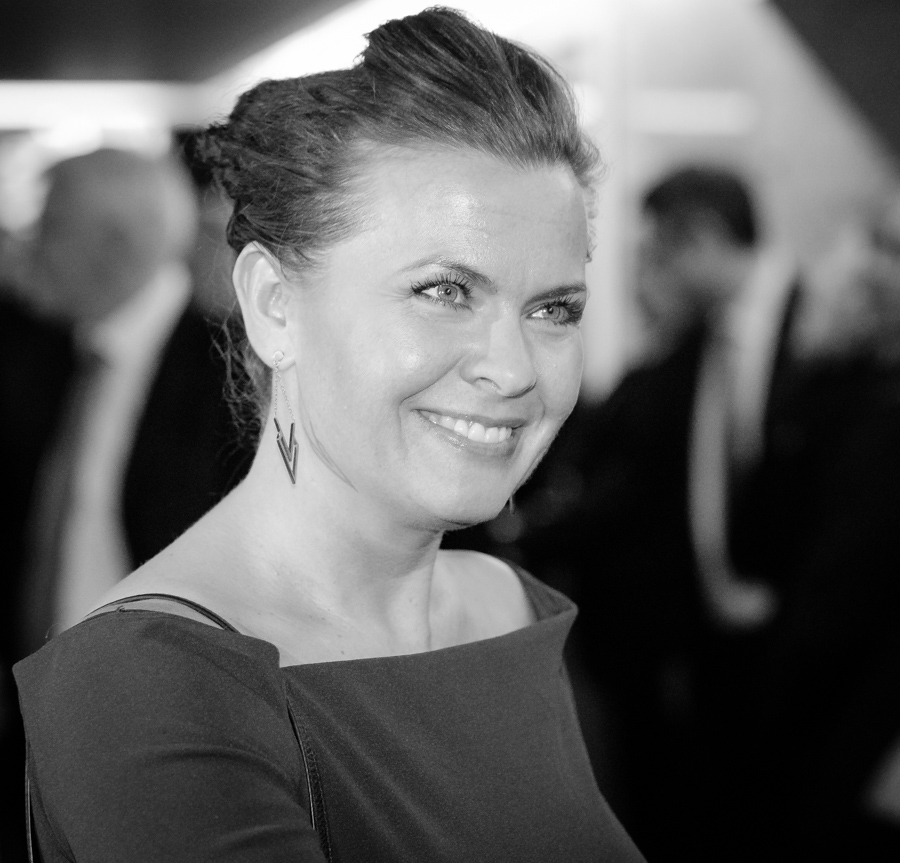
Jorunn Lossius, 2018

- Christian Jensen Lofthuus (1750–1797), the owner of Lofthus farm and leader of the peasant revolt Lofthusreisingen which was commemorated with a monument at the harbour in Lillesand
- Mads Langaard (1815 in Lillesand – 1891), a brewery owner who founded Frydenlunds bryggeri, now a division of Ringnes
- N. O. Nelson (1844 in Lillesand – 1922), the founder of N. O. Nelson Manufacturing Company in St. Louis, Missouri, and founder of the village of LeClaire as a model company town
- Knut Hamsun (1859–1952), a writer and winner of the Nobel Prize in Literature bought Nørholm, a dilapidated manor house between Lillesand and Grimstad where he lived and worked
- Gabriel Scott (1874–1958), a poet, novelist, playwright, and children's writer who was brought up in Høvåg Municipality
- Mathis Mathisen (born 1937 in Lillesand), a teacher, novelist, playwright, and children's writer
- Liv Stoveland (born 1965 in Lillesand), a soprano and singing teacher
- Jorunn Gleditsch Lossius (born 1980), a politician and deputy Mayor of Lillesand
- Jan Trygve Røyneland (born 1981 in Lillesand), a TV and film writer
- Sophie's World (written in 1991), a book by writer Jostein Gaarder about Sophie Amundsen, a 14-year-old girl who lives in Lillesand
- Heroes & Zeros (formed in 2003), a rock band from Lillesand whose lead singer is Hans Jørgen Undelstvedt

== International relations ==
=== Twin towns — Sister cities ===
Lillesand has sister city agreements with the following places:

- Kalundborg, Region Sjælland, Denmark
- Kimitoön, Southwest Finland, Finland
- Nynäshamn, Stockholm County, Sweden
