= Austre Grimevannet =

Lake in Lillesand, Norway

- Furuøyfjorden; Grimevannet
- Location: Lillesand Municipality, Agder
- Coordinates: 58.30255°N 8.37845°E
- Primary inflows: Vestre Grimevannet
- Primary outflows: Osen river
- Basin countries: Norway
- Max. length: 5 kilometres (3.1 mi)
- Max. width: 2.4 kilometres (1.5 mi)
- Surface area: 3.94 km^{2} (1.52 sq mi)
- Shore length^{1}: 30.28 kilometres (18.82 mi)
- Surface elevation: 43 metres (141 ft)
- References: NVE

Location
- Interactive map of Austre Grimevannet
- ^{1} Shore length is not a well-defined measure.

Austre Grimevannet is a lake in Lillesand Municipality in Agder county, Norway. The 3.94-square-kilometre (1.52 sq mi) lake is located north of the European route E18 highway about 3 kilometres (1.9 mi) from the city of Lillesand. It is the drinking water reservoir for Lillesand Municipality.

== Name ==
The official name of the lake is Austre Grimevannet and there are two alternate spellings that are approved, but less-preferred: Østre Grimevann and Østre Grimevannet. There are also two alternate names that are allowed, but they are also considered less preferred: Furuøyfjorden and Grimevannet.

== See also ==
- List of lakes in Aust-Agder
- List of lakes in Norway
