= Lillesand Town- and Maritime Museum =

Local history museum in Lillesand, Norway

Coordinates: 58.249585°N 8.379242°E

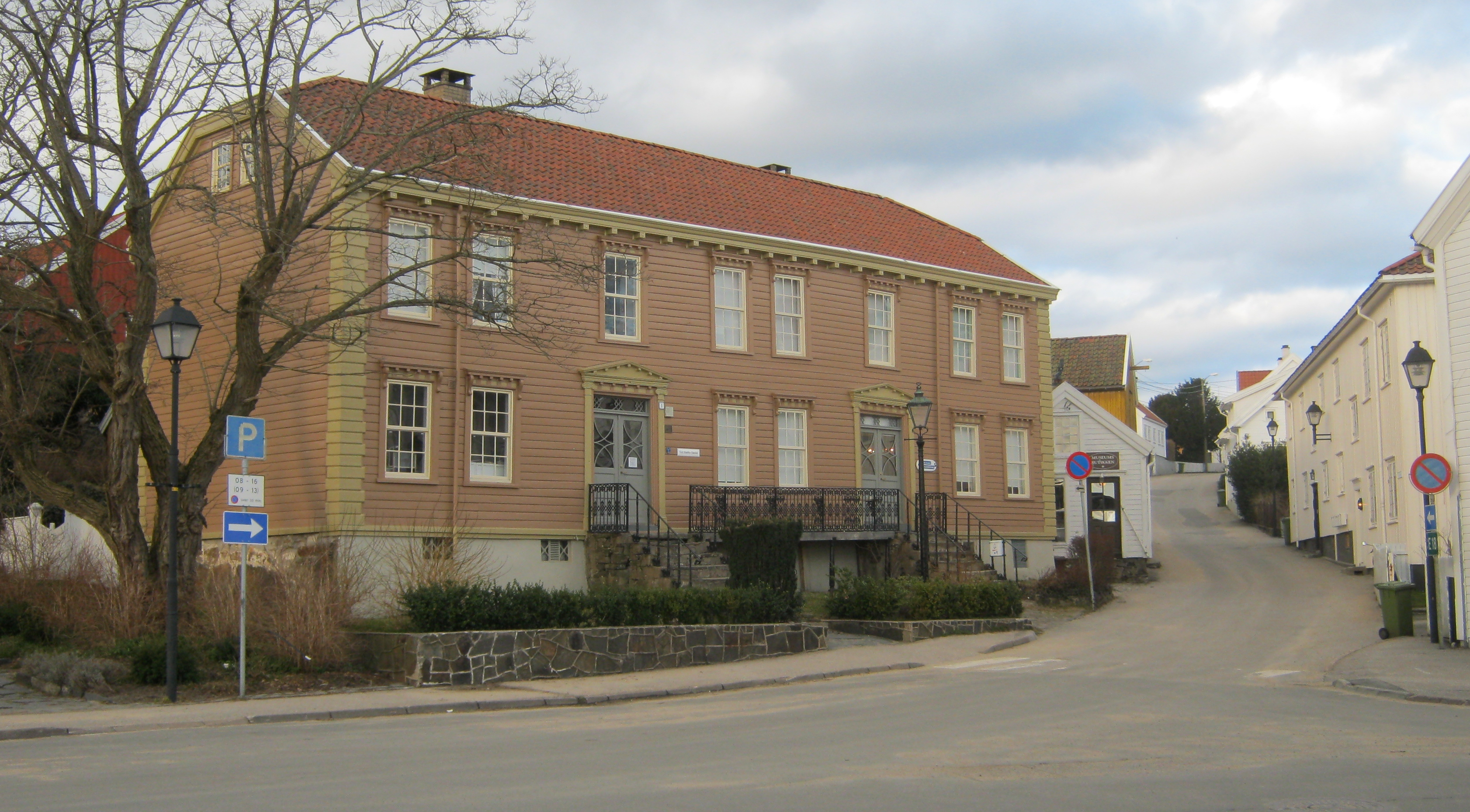
Carl Knudsen-gården

Lillesand Town- and Maritime Museum (Norwegian: Lillesand by- og sjøfartsmuseum) is a museum of the cultural history of Lillesand. The museum is located in the town of Lillesand in Lillesand Municipality in Agder county, Norway. The museum, established in 1970, was formerly a part of the AAKS (the Aust-Agder historical center), but starting in 2012 it was back under the control of Lillesand Municipality. Anne Sophie Hoegh-Omdal has been employed as the museum director since 1 May 2010.

The museum includes The farm in the town which is often called Carl Knudsen-gården (Carl Knudsen's farm) after the last owner's father. The last owner was Thyra Mercedes Knudsen, who died childless in 1963. She let Lillesand Municipality have the right of first refusal to the buildings on the property and it was converted into a museum.

A separate department of the museum is a customs museum in the old customs house, located in the harbor nearby.

== Carl Knudsen-gården ==
The museum is an old merchant's house from 1827. In the backyard, the intact buildings were originally warehouses and a merchant store. It now houses the sailmakers and the smiths workshops, sailor's house, forge, barn and stables, scullery room, and two car sheds. The museum has changing exhibitions in the annexe, behind the Museum Store.

== Old customs house ==
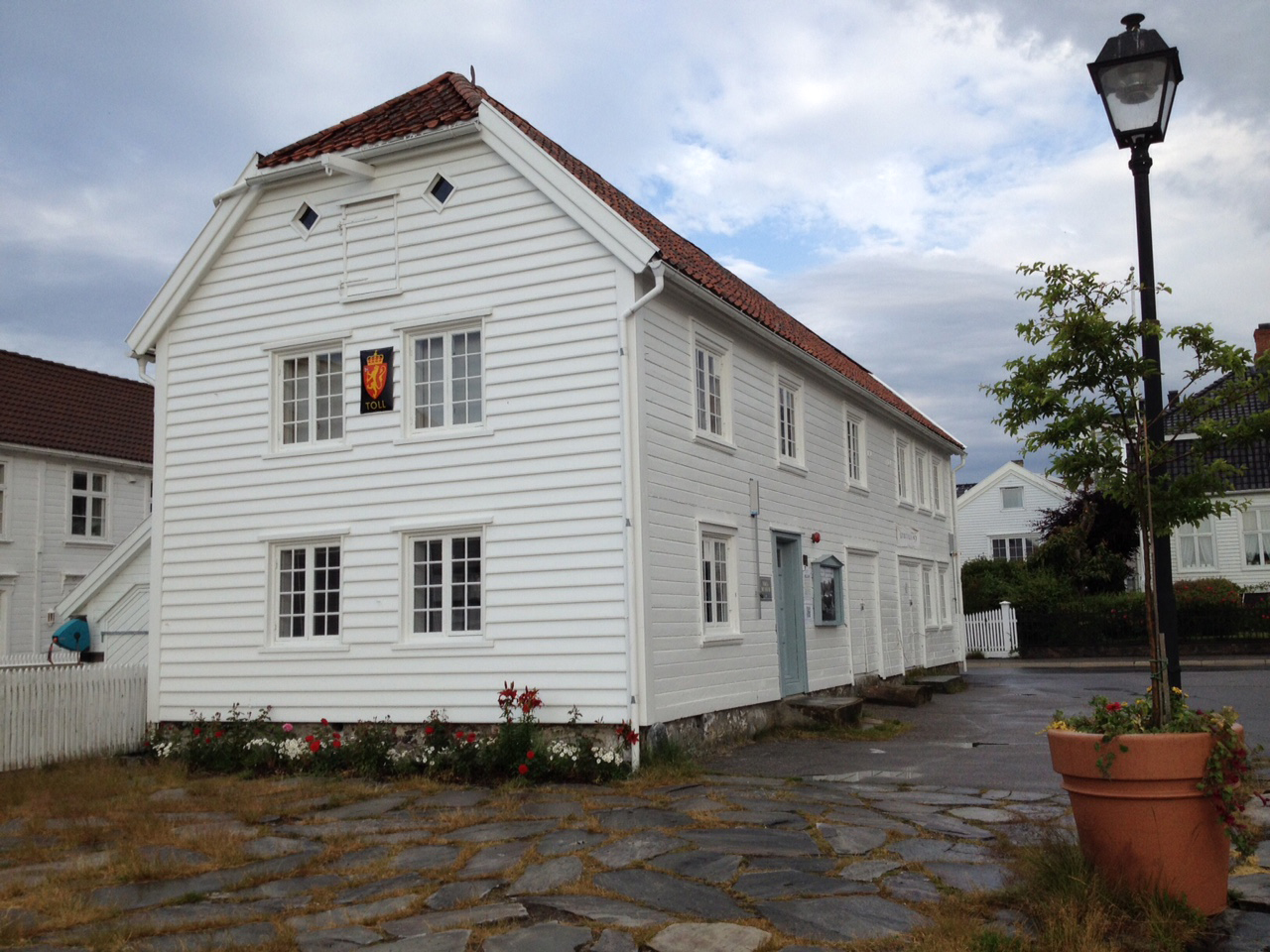
The former customs house

The museum also contains an old customs house down at the harbor. Here is a customs museum, and in a separate part of the house is the studio and art exhibitions. In winter time, the whole house is a studio, disposed by local artist Erlend Larsen.
