= Lillesand Church =

Church in Agder, Norway

- Lillesand kirke
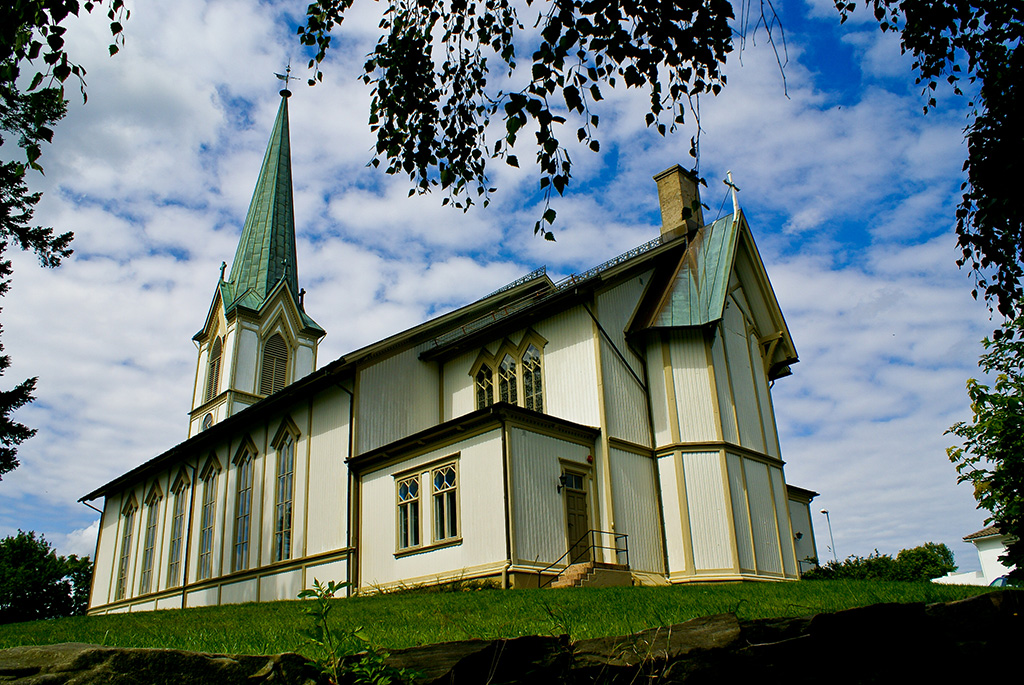
- View of the church
- Lillesand Church
- 58.250391°N 08.381799°E
- Location: Lillesand Municipality, Agder
- Country: Norway
- Denomination: Church of Norway
- Churchmanship: Evangelical Lutheran

History
- Status: Parish church

Architecture
- Functional status: Active
- Architect: Henrik Thrap-Meyer
- Architectural type: Long church
- Style: Swiss chalet style
- Completed: 1889 (137 years ago)

Specifications
- Capacity: 490
- Materials: Wood

Administration
- Diocese: Agder og Telemark
- Deanery: Vest-Nedenes prosti
- Parish: Lillesand
- Norwegian Cultural Heritage Site
- Type: Church
- Status: Listed
- ID: 84306

Lillesand Church (Norwegian: Lillesand kirke) is a parish church of the Church of Norway in Lillesand Municipality in Agder county, Norway. It is located in the town of Lillesand. It is one of the churches for the Lillesand parish which is part of the Vest-Nedenes prosti (deanery) in the Diocese of Agder og Telemark. The white, wooden, Swiss chalet style church was built in a long church design in 1889 using plans drawn up by the architect Henrik Thrap-Meyer. The church seats about 490 people.

== History ==
As the small town of Lillesand grew, the nearby Vestre Moland Church grew too small for the parish, so in 1886, a plot of land was given and an architect was hired with the intention of building a new church in the centre of the town. The new church would serve the people of the town and the Vestre Moland Church would serve the rural areas surrounding the town. In the spring of 1887, work began on the new building. The construction took a little longer than expected because the materials were not dry enough. There were also problems when parts of the north wall gave way under the weight of the roof. The church was consecrated on 25 September 1889.

This church was built in the town of Lillesand where there is no room for a cemetery at this church site, so the parishioners are buried at the Vestre Moland Church graveyard, just outside of the town.

== Media gallery ==
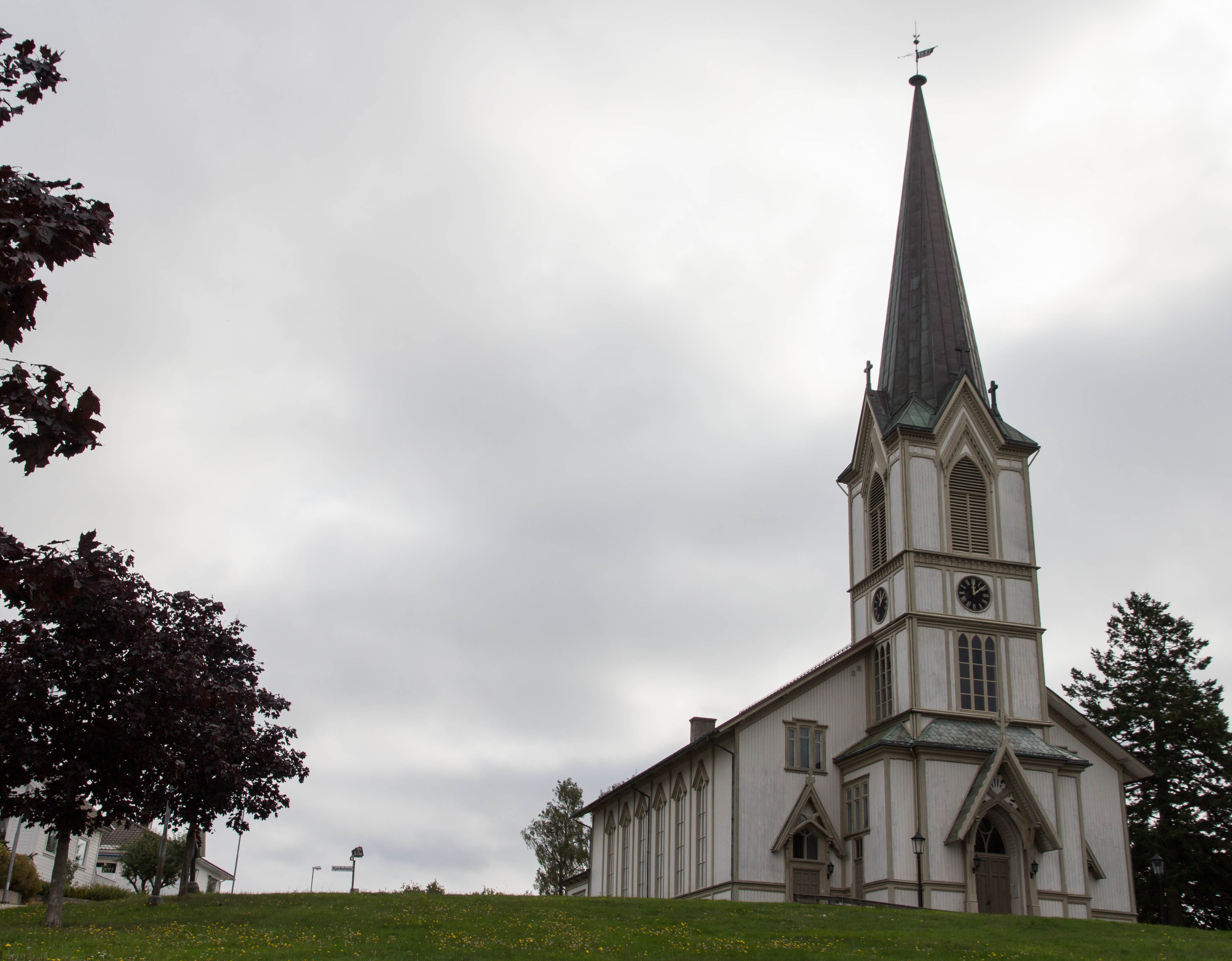

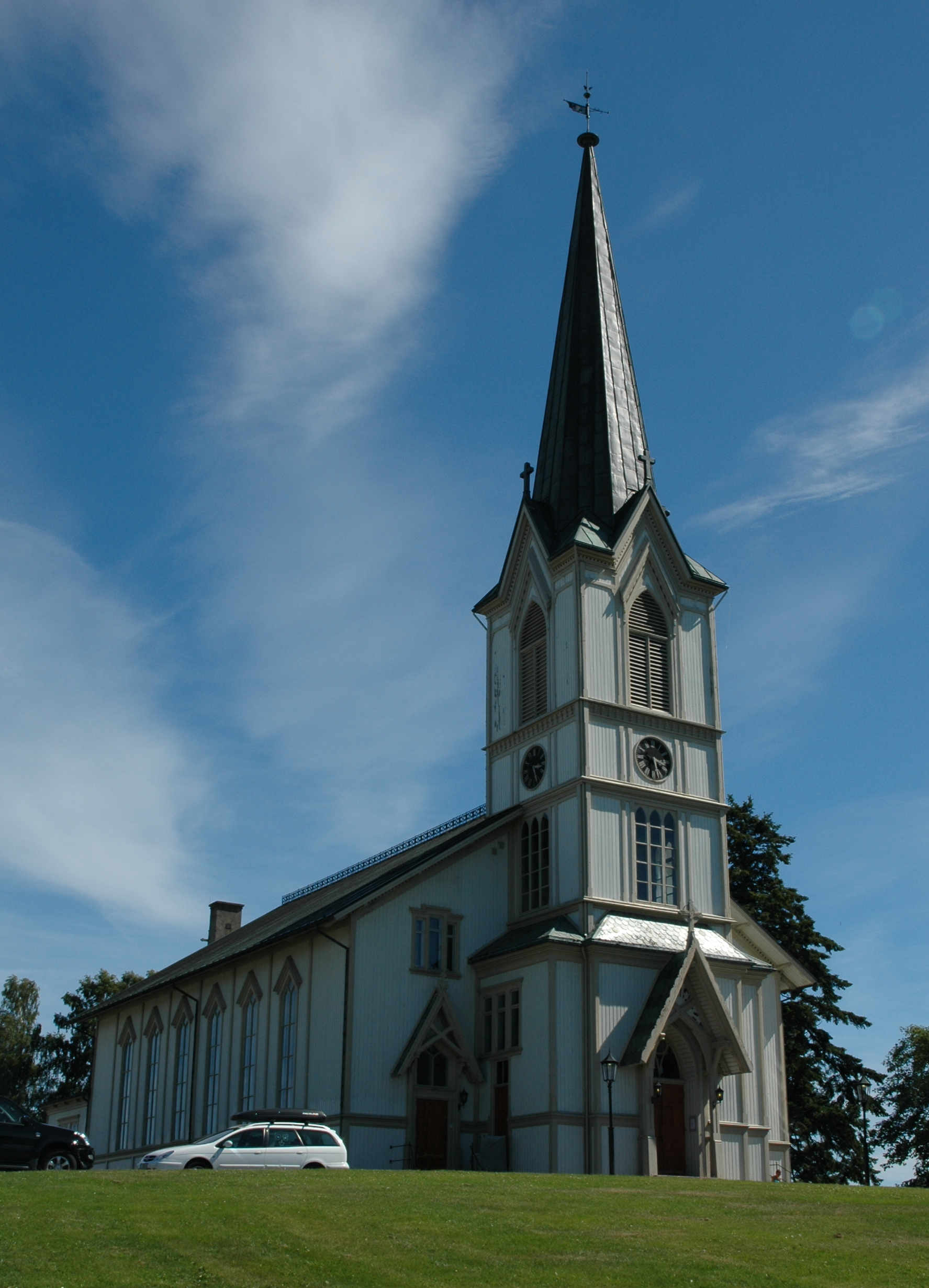

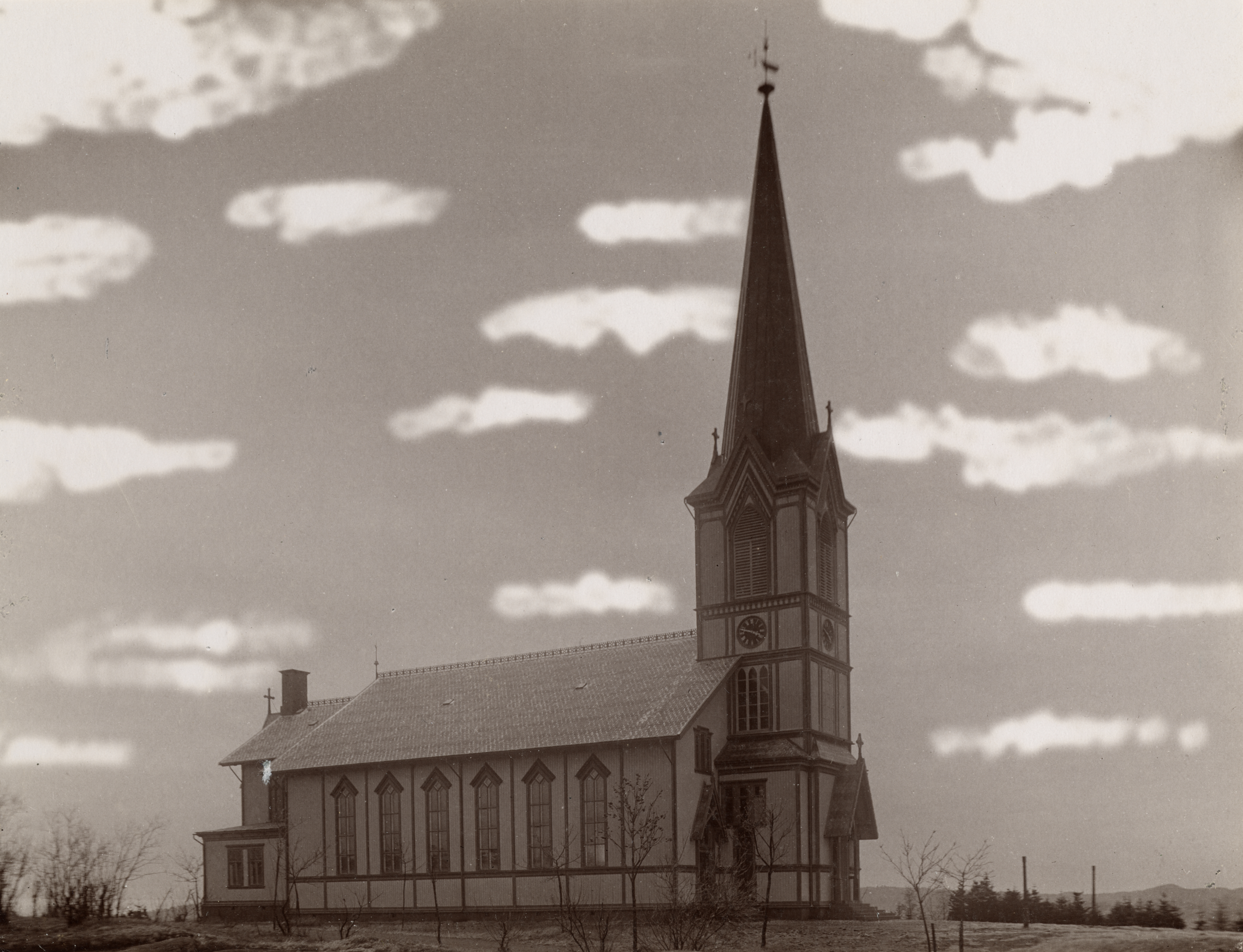
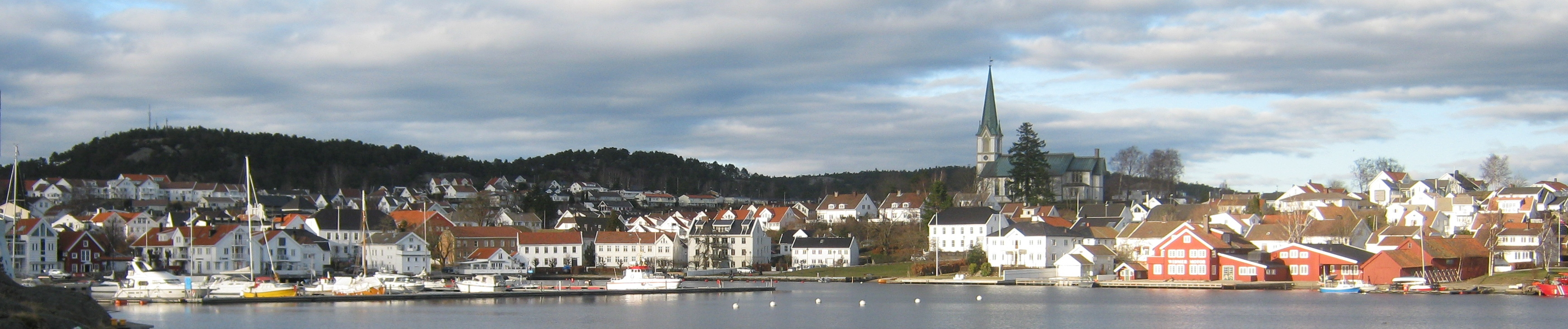
View of the church along the Lillesand harbor

== See also ==
- List of churches in Agder og Telemark
