= Ulvøysund =

Village in Lillesand Municipality, Norway

- Village
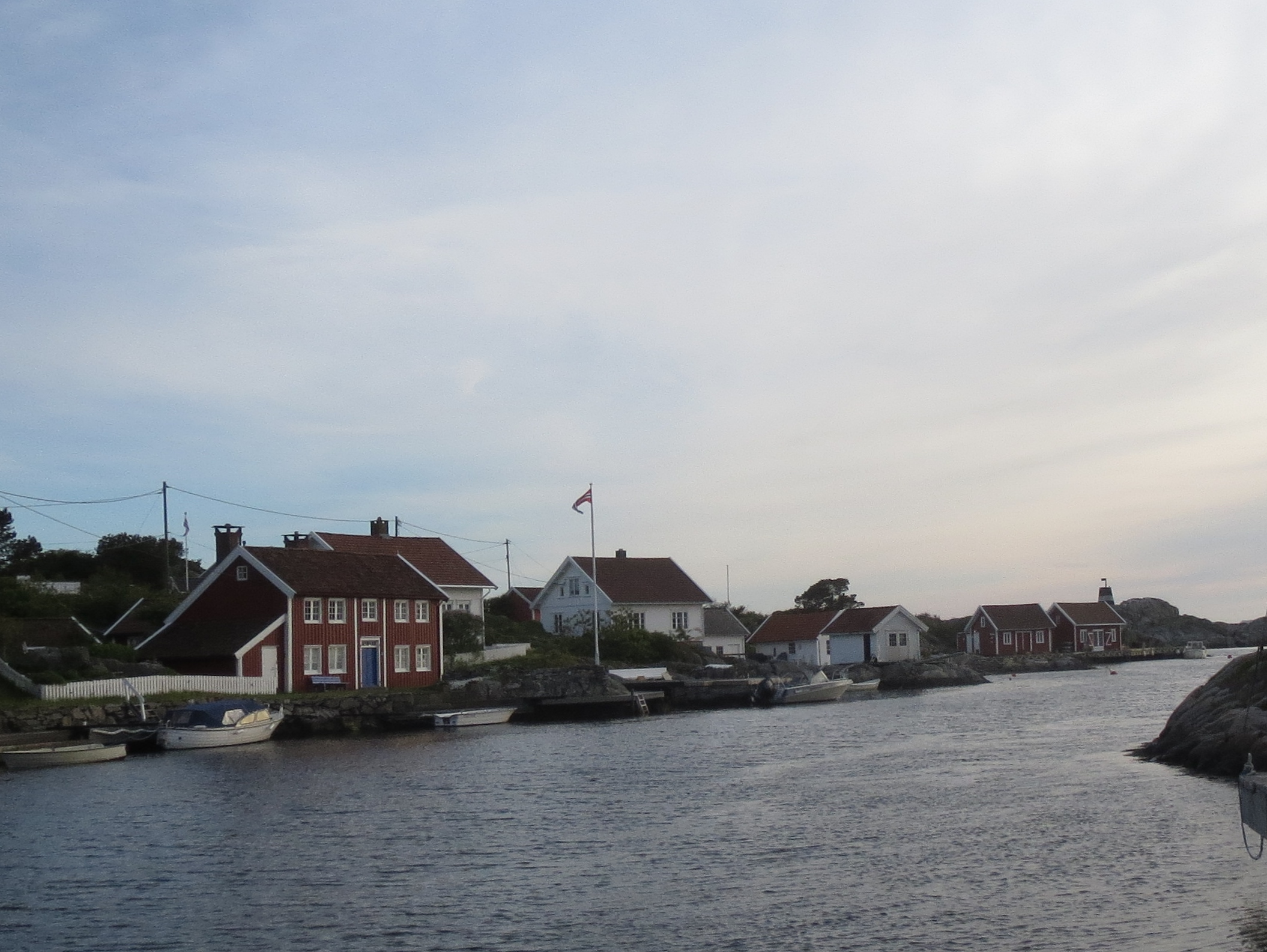
- View of the village
- Interactive map of Ulvøysund
- Coordinates: 58.1137°N 08.2101°E
- Country: Norway
- Region: Southern Norway
- County: Agder
- Municipality: Lillesand Municipality
- Elevation: 1 m (3.3 ft)
- Time zone: UTC+01:00 (CET)
  - Summer (DST): UTC+02:00 (CEST)
- Post Code: 4770 Høvåg

Ulvøysund is a village and an outport in Lillesand Municipality in Agder county, Norway. The village lies on the east side of the Kvåsefjorden on the island of Ulvøya. Just northeast of Ulvøysund is the entrance to the Blindleia inland waterway which leads towards the town of Lillesand. The village is connected to the mainland by road. The nearby village of Ribe lies about 2 kilometres (1.2 mi) straight north of Ulvøysund. The village was historically used as an outport along the Skagerrak coast for the large ships that couldn't navigate inland through the archipelago to the towns on the mainland.

== History ==
The oldest sign of activity in Ulvøysund, is an old shipwreck on the approach of Kvåsefjorden. It was archaeologically investigated in 2011 by the Norwegian Maritime Museum, and a piece of a reindeer antler from the finding was later Carbon-14 dated to the period between the years 1020-1030.

In the Middle Ages, Ulvøysund had a permanent population. During the 14th century a bishop from Bergen wrote a letter (that still exists today) saying that he was stuck in Ulvøysund due to the weather. A compass rose carved into the rock on the island of Ulvøya is possibly from the 15th century. The outport is mentioned on Dutch maps from the 16th century as Wolfsondt. Ulvøysund's oldest house still standing and it is used as a guest house. The house's oldest parts are probably from the 17th century.
