= Helldal =

Village in Lillesand Municipality, Norway

Helldal Heldal
- Village
- Interactive map of Helldal
- Coordinates: 58.2698°N 08.4120°E
- Country: Norway
- Region: Southern Norway
- County: Agder
- Municipality: Lillesand Municipality
- Elevation: 4 m (13 ft)
- Time zone: UTC+01:00 (CET)
  - Summer (DST): UTC+02:00 (CEST)
- Post Code: 4790 Lillesand

Helldal is a village in Lillesand Municipality in Agder county, Norway. The village is located along the Norwegian County Road 420 and the Kaldvellfjorden, about 3 kilometres (1.9 mi) northeast of the town of Lillesand. Access to the European route E18 highway is just south of Helldal.
