= Saltholmen Lighthouse =

Saltholmen Lighthouse Saltholmen fyrstasjon
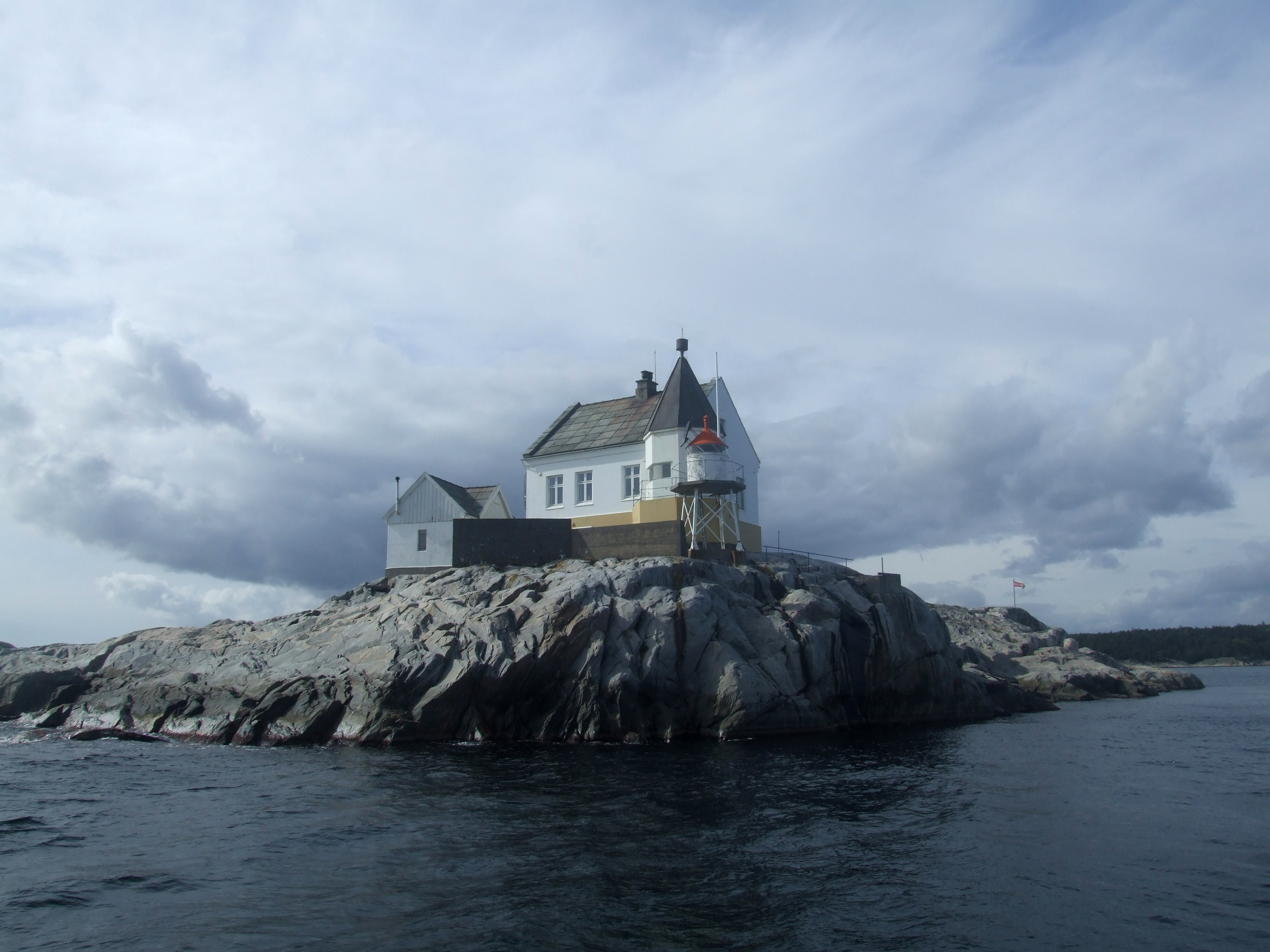
- View of the lighthouse
- Location: Agder, Norway
- Coordinates: 58.231813°N 08.403689°E

Tower
- Constructed: 1882 (first)
- Construction: Metal tower
- Height: 5.5 metres (18 ft)
- Shape: Square tower with balcony
- Markings: White with red roof
- Heritage: cultural property

Light
- First lit: 1952 (current)
- Deactivated: 1952 (first)
- Focal height: 13 metres (43 ft)
- Lens: 4th order Fresnel lens
- Range: 4.6 nmi (8.5 km; 5.3 mi)
- Characteristic: Fl (2) WRG 5s
- Norway no.: 067500

Saltholmen Lighthouse (Norwegian: Saltholmen fyrstasjon) is a lighthouse in Lillesand Municipality in Agder county, Norway. It is located on a small island off the coast about 2 kilometres (1.2 mi) southeast of the town of Lillesand. There has been a lighthouse here since 1882. The island (and lighthouse) are named Saltholmen (lit. 'Salty Islet'). This name comes from the salt extraction industry established by Hans Nielsen Hauge that once was located there. The lighthouse is only accessible by boat and the site is open, but the building is not open to the public.

== Current lighthouse ==
The present lighthouse was built in 1952 to replace the older building located on the same site. The present light sits on top of a 5.5-metre (18 ft) tall square frustum-shaped metal skeleton tower that is painted white with a red roof. The light sits at an elevation of 13 metres (43 ft) above sea level. The white, red, or green light (depending on direction) emits two flashes every 15 seconds. The light can be seen for up to 4.6 nautical miles (8.5 km; 5.3 mi).

== History ==
The lighthouse was commissioned in 1882. The original lighthouse was built of concrete, and has an octagonal tower with a spire in a corner. The shape of the tower is rarely seen in Norway and the lighthouse is largely preserved as it was built. The lighthouse is therefore protected under the law on cultural heritage. The lighthouse was closed in 1952 and the present lighthouse was constructed immediately next to it. The original lighthouse was white with a sharply pyramidal gray roof. The 6-metre (20 ft) tall tower held a light that could be seen for up to 11.4 nautical miles (21.1 km; 13.1 mi). In 2012, the old lighthouse buildings were transferred to a non-profit foundation to preserve them as a museum.

== See also ==
- List of lighthouses in Norway
- Lighthouses in Norway
