= Kristian Sundtoft =

Norwegian politician

Kristian Sundtoft (11 August 1937 – 2 January 2015) was a Norwegian politician for the Conservative Party.

He was born in Åmli Municipality, but moved to Lillesand Municipality. He started his political career on the municipal council of Lillesand Municipality in 1964. He became mayor of Lillesand for eight years as well as county mayor of Aust-Agder in 1976. He served as a deputy representative to the Parliament of Norway from Aust-Agder during the terms 1965–1969, 1981–1985 and 1993–1997. In total he served during 30 days of parliamentary session. From 1989 to 1995 he chaired Aust-Agder Conservative Party, but he changed allegiance to the Liberal Party which he also represented in the municipal council.

Sundtoft was also chairman of Kommunal Landspensjonskasse and deputy chair of the Norwegian Association of Local and Regional Authorities.

He was decorated with the King's Medal of Merit in gold in 2005. He was the father of Tine Sundtoft.

Political offices
Preceded by	County mayor of Aust-Agder; 1976–1983	Succeeded by
