= Vestre Moland Church =

Church in Agder, Norway

- Vestre Moland kirke
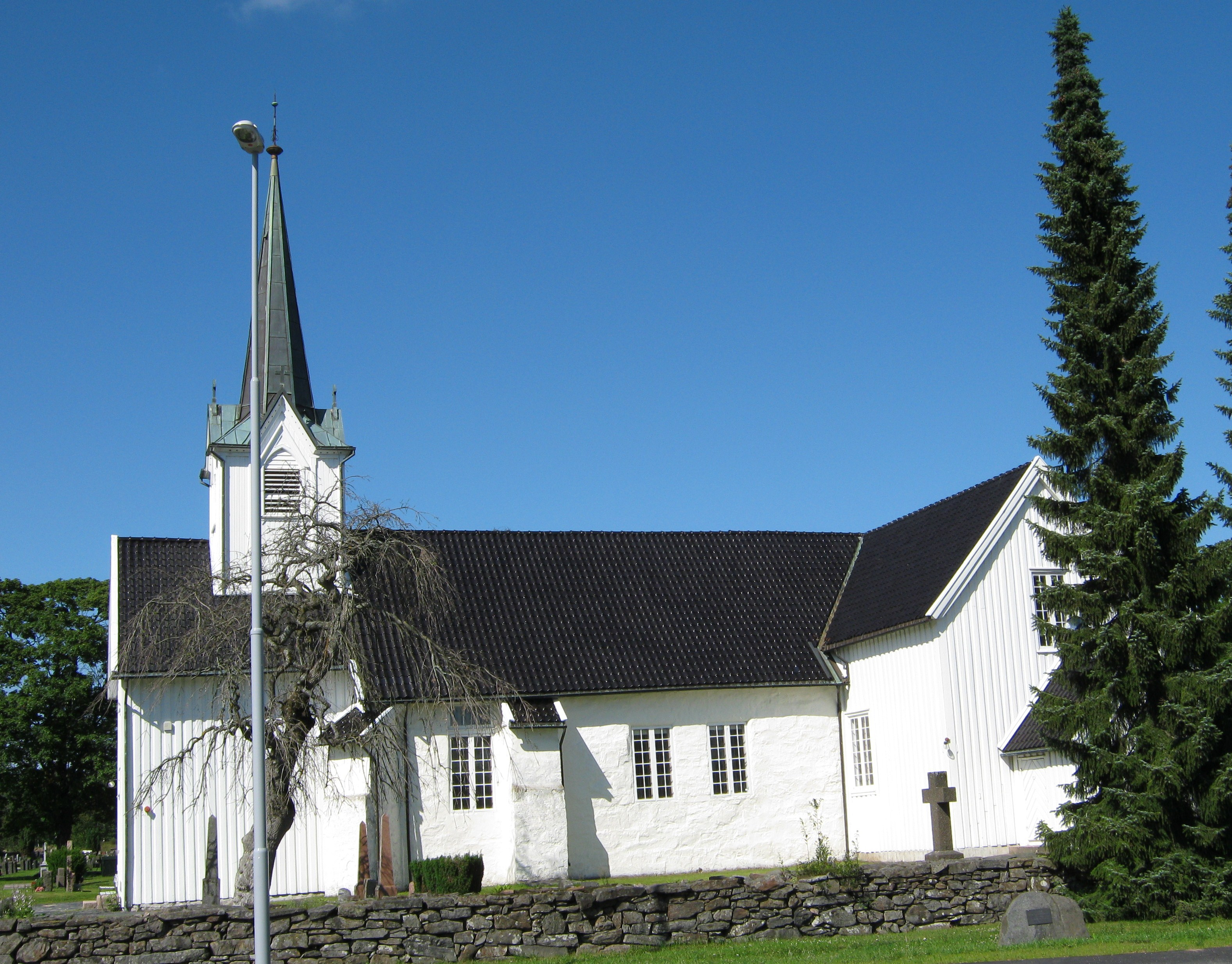
- View of the church
- Vestre Moland Church
- 58.2589°N 08.3652°E
- Location: Lillesand Municipality, Agder
- Country: Norway
- Denomination: Church of Norway
- Previous denomination: Catholic Church
- Churchmanship: Evangelical Lutheran

History
- Status: Parish church
- Founded: c. 1150
- Events: 1797: large addition

Architecture
- Functional status: Active
- Architectural type: Cruciform
- Completed: c. 1150 (876 years ago)

Specifications
- Capacity: 350
- Materials: Stone

Administration
- Diocese: Agder og Telemark
- Deanery: Vest-Nedenes prosti
- Parish: Lillesand
- Norwegian Cultural Heritage Site
- Type: Church
- Status: Automatically protected
- ID: 85819

Vestre Moland Church (Norwegian: Vestre Moland kirke) is a parish church of the Church of Norway in Lillesand Municipality in Agder county, Norway. It is located in the village of Møglestu, just outside the town of Lillesand. It is one of the churches for the Lillesand parish which is part of the Vest-Nedenes prosti (deanery) in the Diocese of Agder og Telemark. The white, stone church was built in a long church design around the year 1150 using plans drawn up by an unknown architect, but has since been converted into a cruciform design. The church seats about 350 people.

== History ==
The earliest existing historical records of the church date back to the year 1347, but the stone long church was likely built around the year 1150. The stone walls were built about 1 metre (3 ft 3 in) thick. Gradually, the medieval church is expanded. First, a small choir area and a tower was added to the building. The altarpiece with a painting from around the year 1630 is by German painter Gottfried Hendtzschel. The pulpit is from 1660. In 1742, a sacristy was added. In 1797, the eastern portion of the old stone church was torn down and a timber-framed addition was built which turned the building into a cruciform design. The medieval stone section that remained, made up the western cross arm of the church after the addition and this design of the church has remained since then. In 1898, a new neo-Gothic tower was built above the entry porch to the building.

In 1814, this church served as an election church (Norwegian: valgkirke). Together with more than 300 other parish churches across Norway, it was a polling station for elections to the 1814 Norwegian Constituent Assembly which wrote the Constitution of Norway. This was Norway's first national elections. Each church parish was a constituency that elected people called "electors" who later met together in each county to elect the representatives for the assembly that was to meet at Eidsvoll Manor later that year.

== Media gallery ==
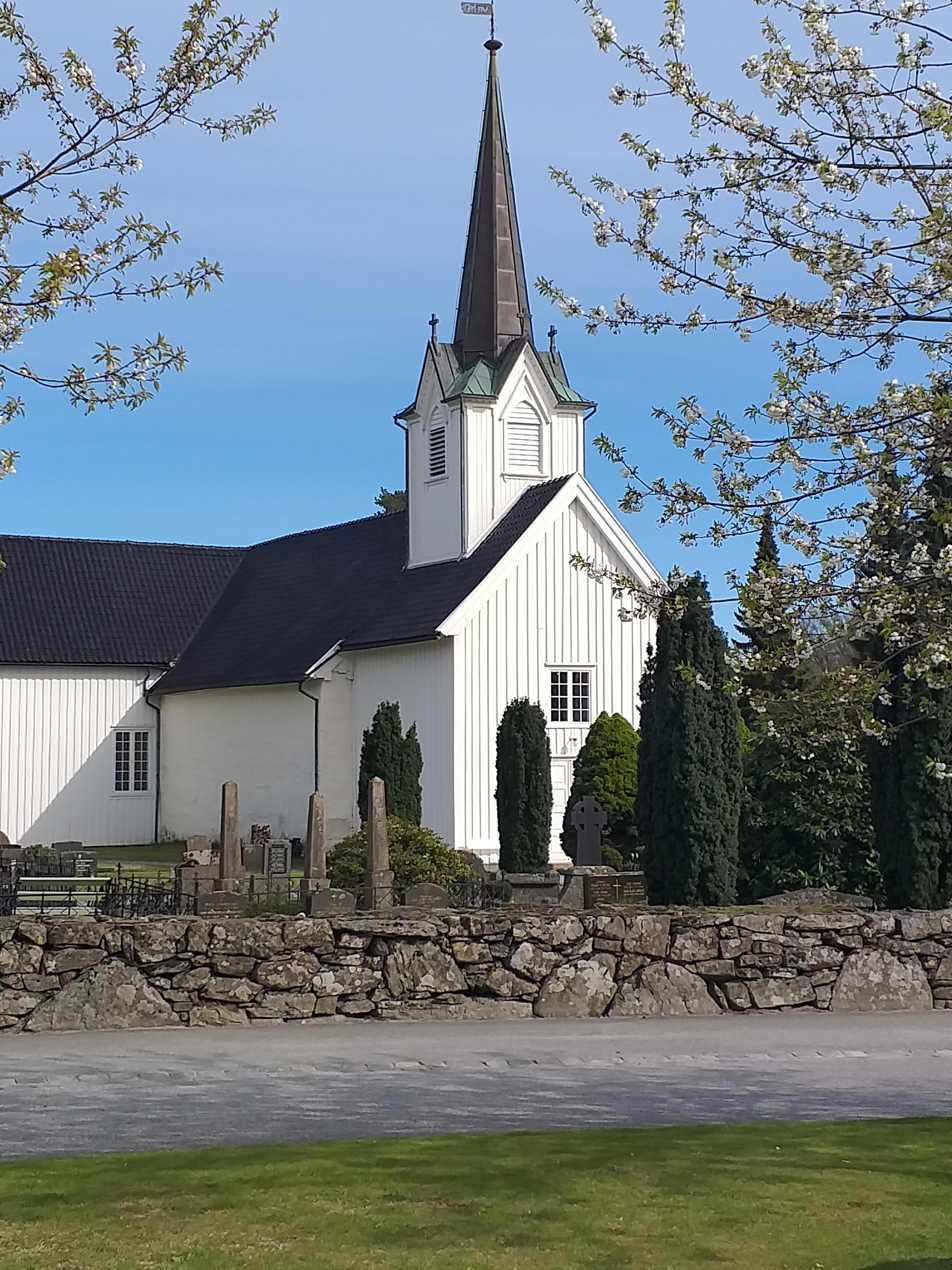

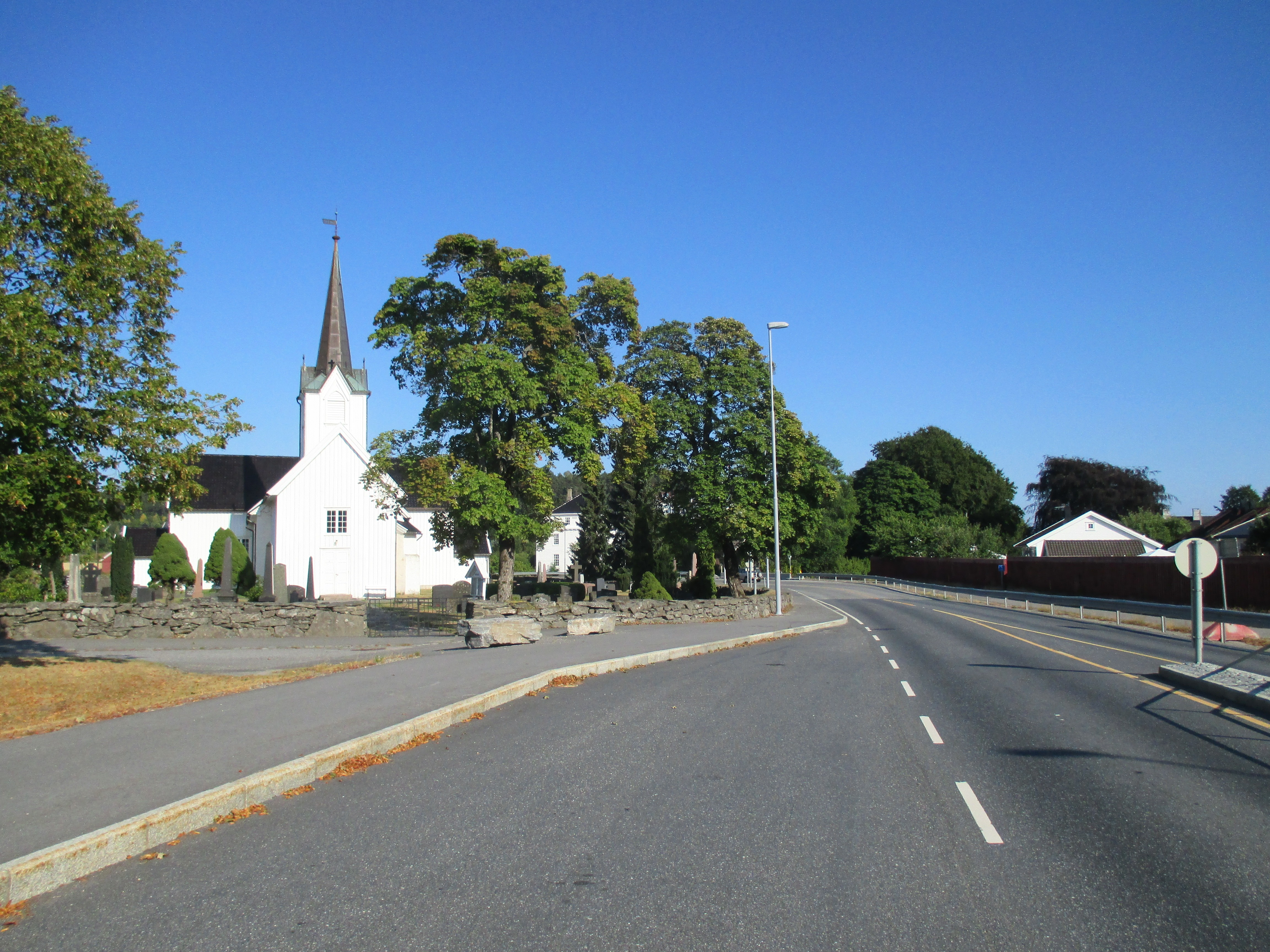

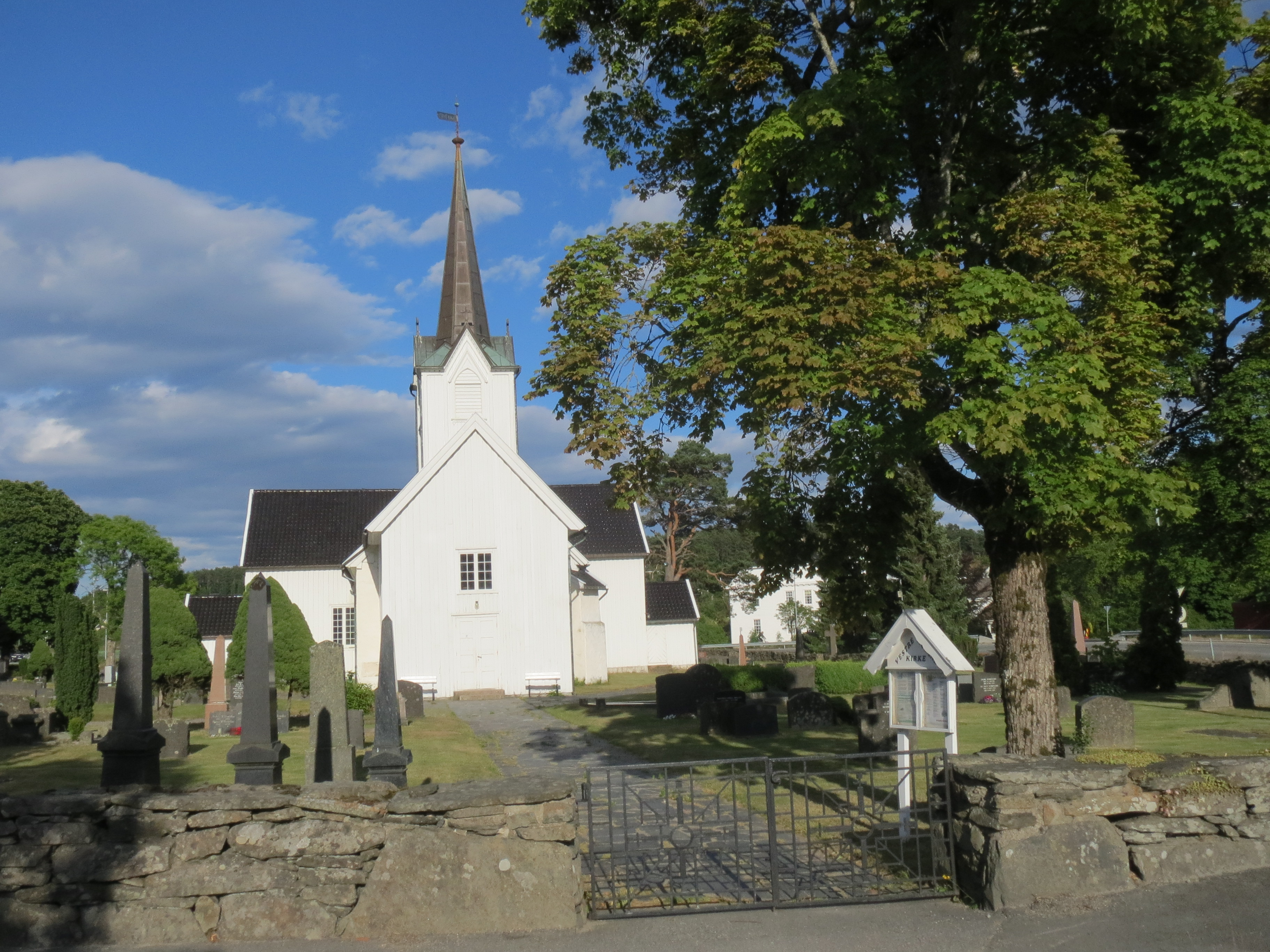

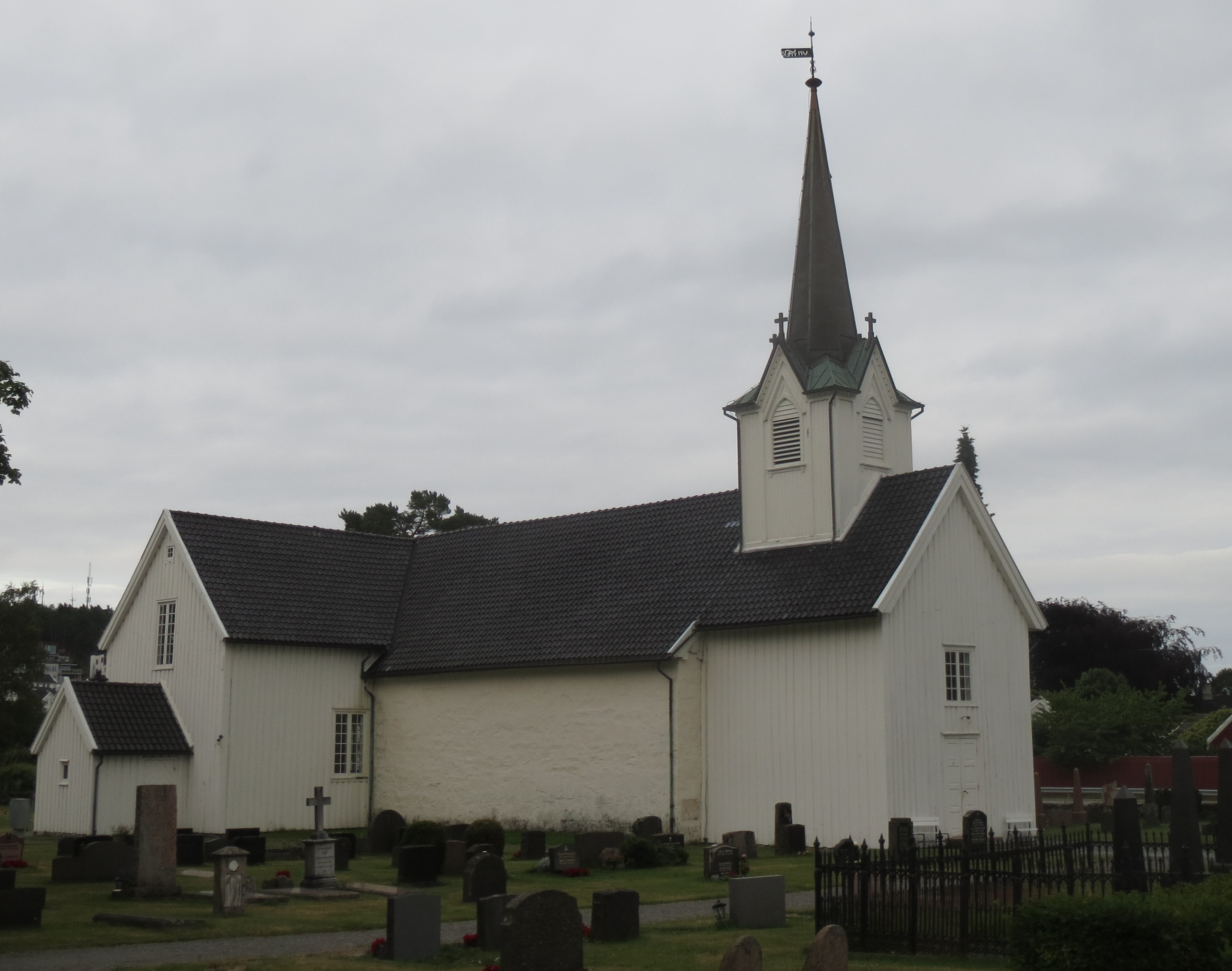

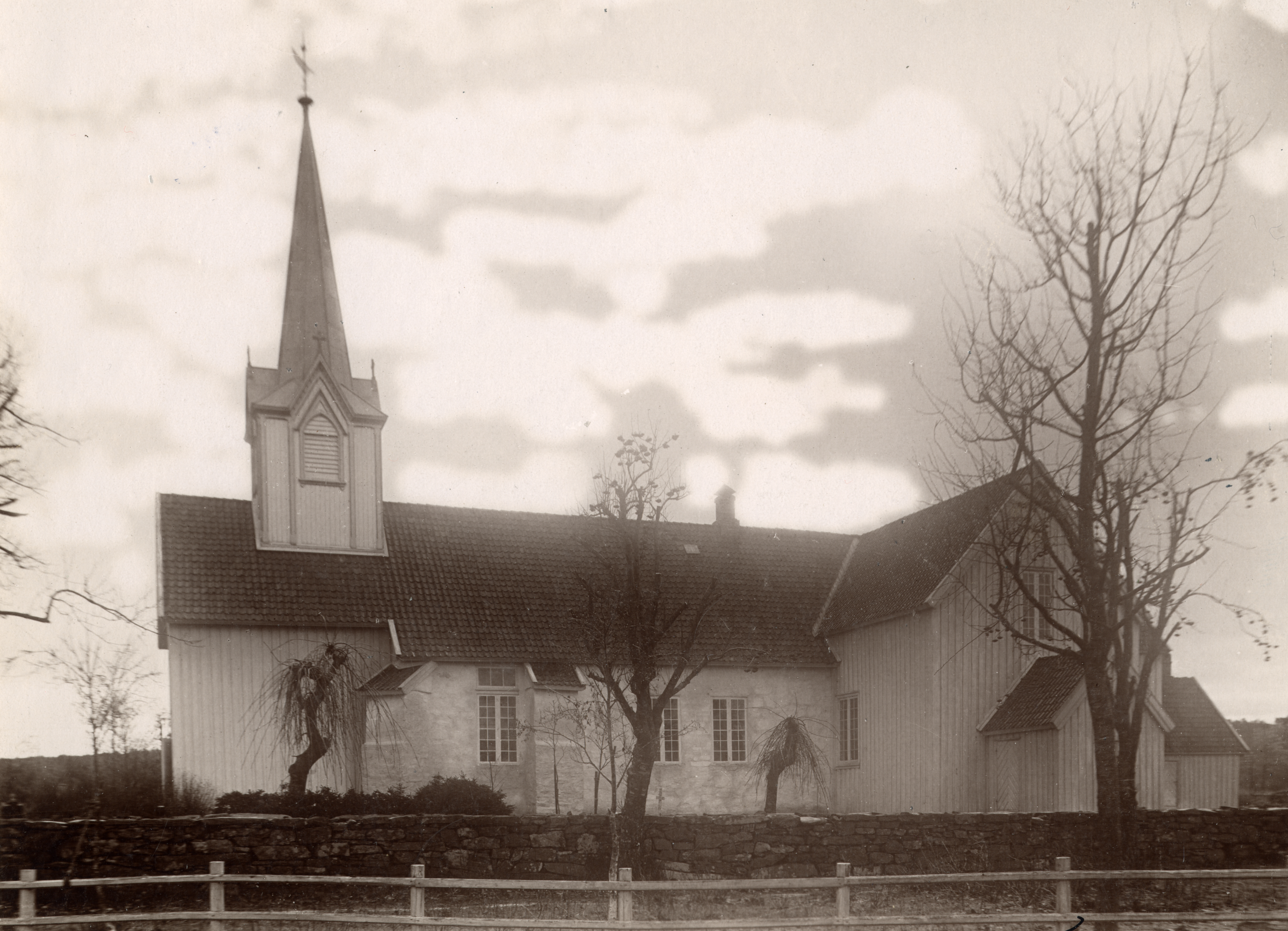

== See also ==
- List of churches in Agder og Telemark
