= Blindleia =

Waterway in Norway

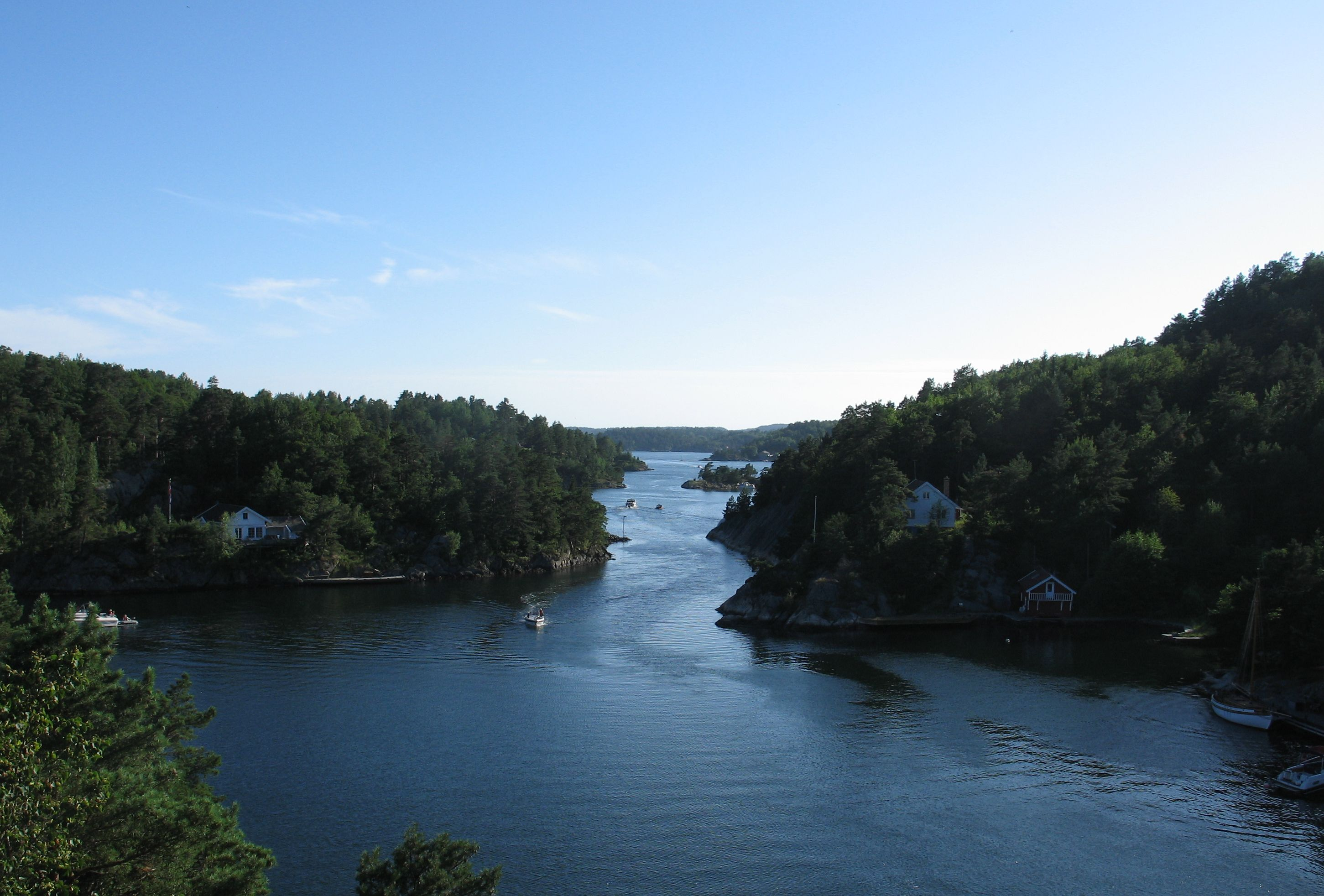
- View of the strait
- Location: Lillesand Municipality, Agder
- Coordinates: 58.1873°N 08.2943°E
- Basin countries: Norway
- Max. length: 20 kilometres (12 mi)
- Surface elevation: 0 metres (0 ft)
- References: NVE

Location
- Interactive map of Blindleia

Blindleia is a 20-kilometre (12 mi) long inland waterway in Lillesand Municipality in Agder county, Norway. The strait starts in the southwest near Gamle Hellesund and Ulvøysund, near the border with Kristiansand Municipality and it continues northeast just past the town of Lillesand. It is a salt water fjord passage that is protected from the open sea by an elongated archipelago of skerries and larger islands. There are several narrow gaps as part of the waterway, some of them only 10 metres (33 ft) wide.

Navigation through the passage is detailed but supposedly not difficult—since there are no tides and very little current—with clearly marked buoys and a few lighthouses along the way.

== See also ==
- Åkerøya
- Gamle Hellesund
- Justøy
- Skottevik
- Kvåsefjorden
