= Høvåg Church =

Church in Agder, Norway

- Høvåg kirke
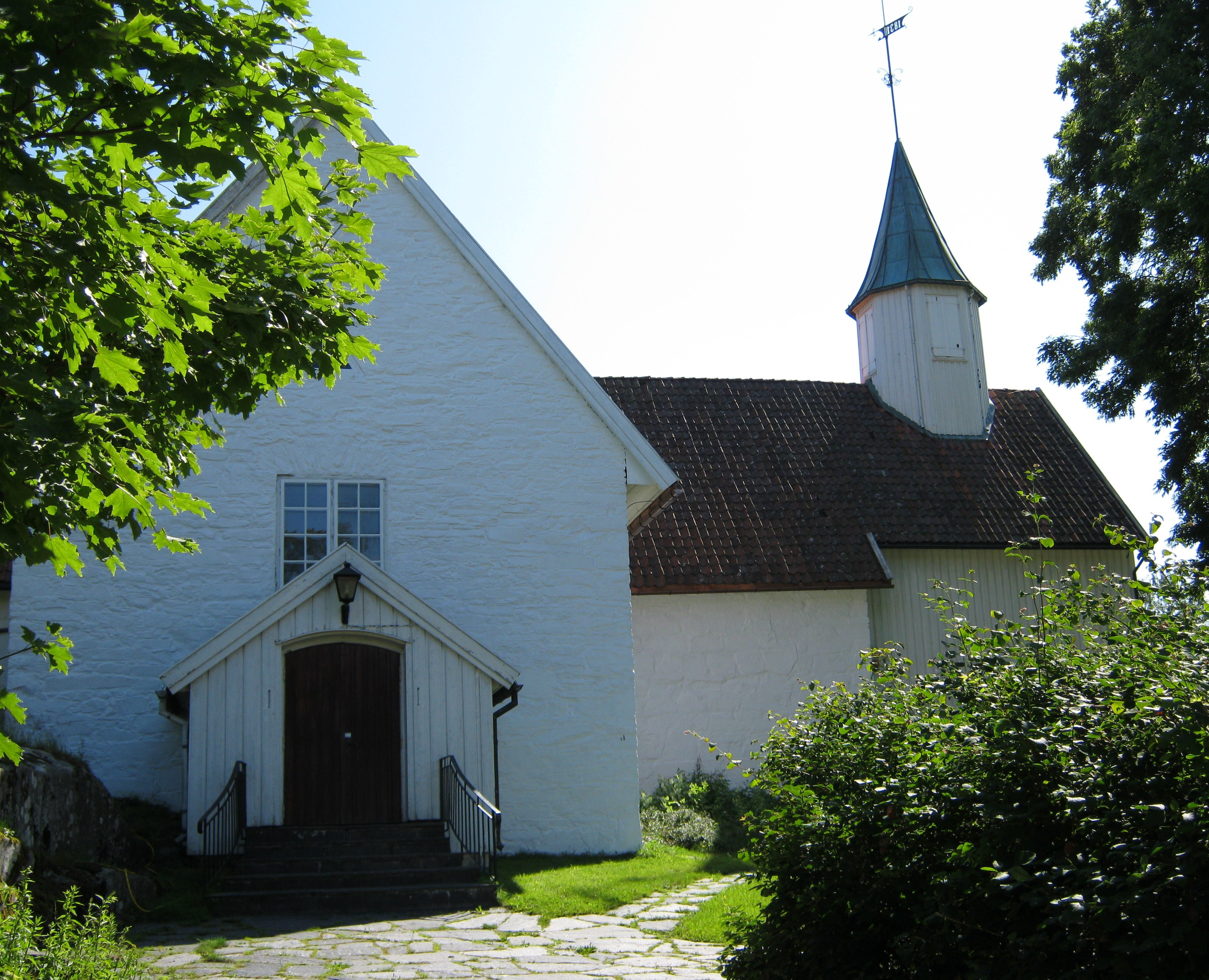
- View of the church
- Høvåg Church
- 58.16762°N 08.24985°E
- Location: Lillesand Municipality, Agder
- Country: Norway
- Denomination: Church of Norway
- Previous denomination: Catholic Church
- Churchmanship: Evangelical Lutheran

History
- Status: Parish church
- Founded: c. 1100

Architecture
- Functional status: Active
- Architectural type: Cruciform
- Completed: c. 1100 (926 years ago)

Specifications
- Capacity: 315
- Materials: Stone

Administration
- Diocese: Agder og Telemark
- Deanery: Vest-Nedenes prosti
- Parish: Høvåg
- Norwegian Cultural Heritage Site
- Type: Church
- Status: Automatically protected
- ID: 84698

Høvåg Church (Norwegian: Høvåg kirke) is a parish church of the Church of Norway in Lillesand Municipality in Agder county, Norway. It is located in the village of Høvåg. It is the church for the Høvåg parish which is part of the Vest-Nedenes prosti (deanery) in the Diocese of Agder og Telemark. The white, stone church was built in a cruciform design around the year 1100 using plans drawn up by an unknown architect. The church seats about 315 people.

== History ==
The earliest existing historical records of the church date back to the year 1416, but the church was likely old by then. The first church on the site was likely a Romanesque stone church that was built around the year 1100. The church was about 10 metres (33 ft) long at the time of its construction.

In 1767, the church was enlarged by adding on to the east and west ends of the building, about doubling the length of the building. In 1828, the church was renovated and enlarged by adding a wing to the north which became the main nave for the church, with cross-arms going to the east and west. The new design of the building then had the choir located in the intersection of the three wings of the T-shaped church. At the same time, a sacristy was also added along the south side of the building. In 1831, the church was enlarged again to the west, by adding a wooden structure with a tower and steeple on top.

Around 1900, the church received a new entry porch at the end of the northern cross arm. This small addition was described in 1912 as tacky and dilapidated, and in 1913 it was torn down and rebuilt. The interior was significantly changed around 1900. In 1960, the addition from 1831 (under the tower) was converted into meeting rooms and a baptismal sacristy. In 1998, there was a bathroom built along the south side.

=== Altarpiece ===
The altarpiece is a triptych from about 1620 by an unknown artist. It represents faith, hope and love. The center part of the altarpiece represents the resurrected Christ (love). To the left is the woman Fides (faith) with a cross and a lime in her hands. The woman to the right is Spes (hope) who has a bird in her hand.

== Media gallery ==
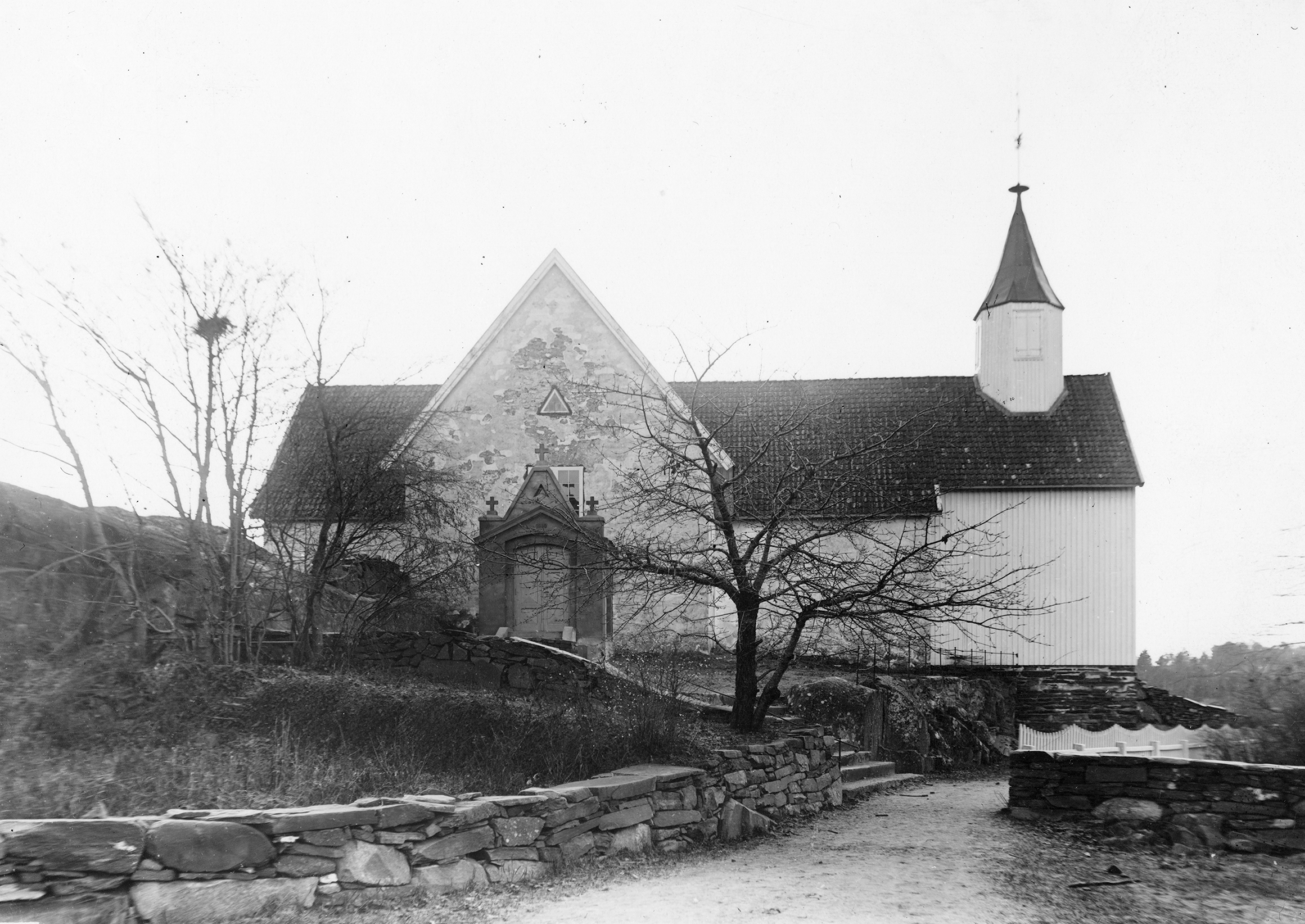
Historic view of the building

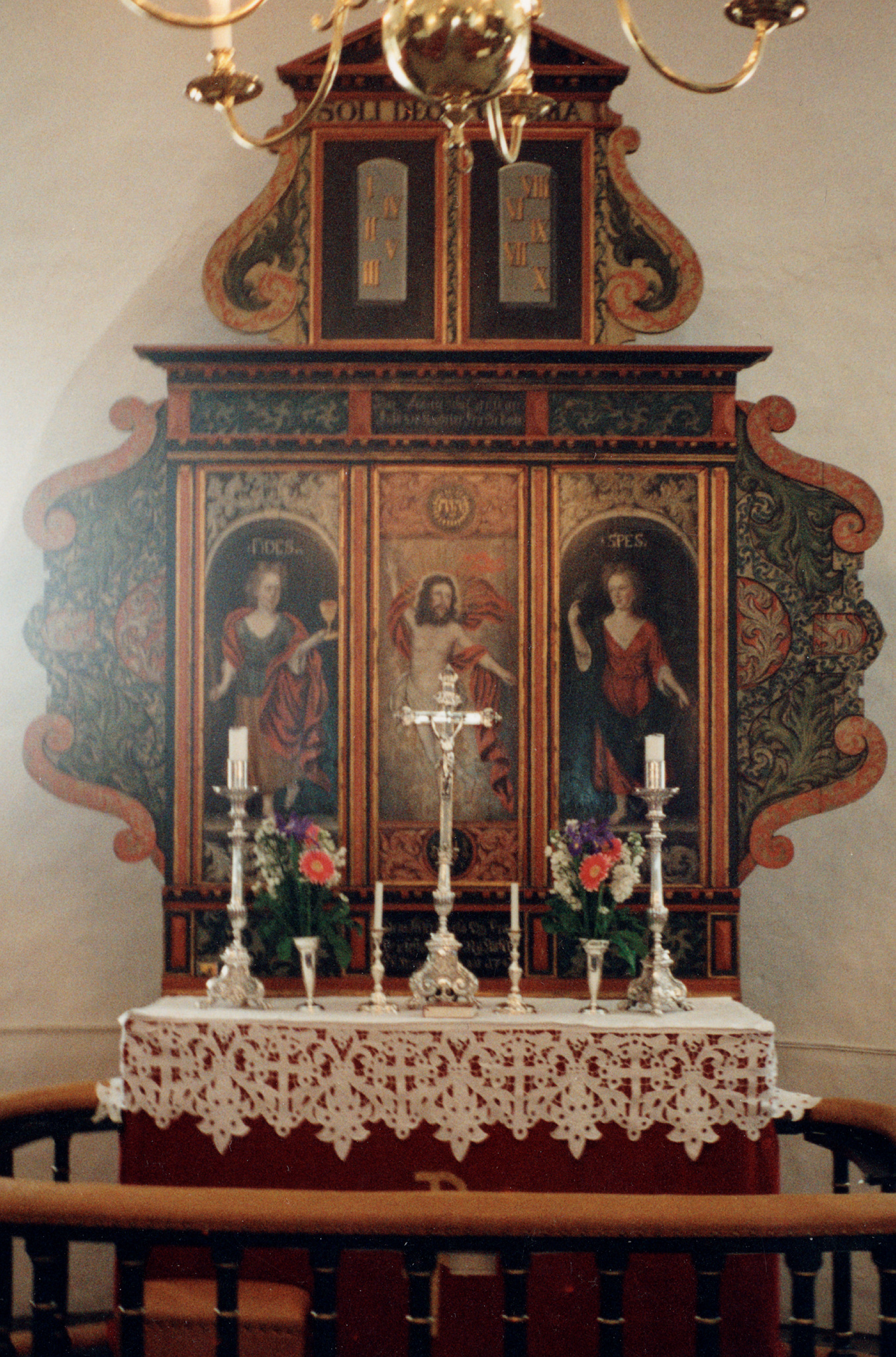
View of the altarpiece

== See also ==
- List of churches in Agder og Telemark
