= Daniel Steen Varen =

Norwegian politician (1908–1991)

Daniel Steen Varen (14 May 1908 - 19 February 1991) was a Norwegian politician for the Liberal Party.

He served as a deputy representative to the Norwegian Parliament from Aust-Agder during the term 1969–1973.
