= Kvåsefjorden =

Fjord in Agder, Norway

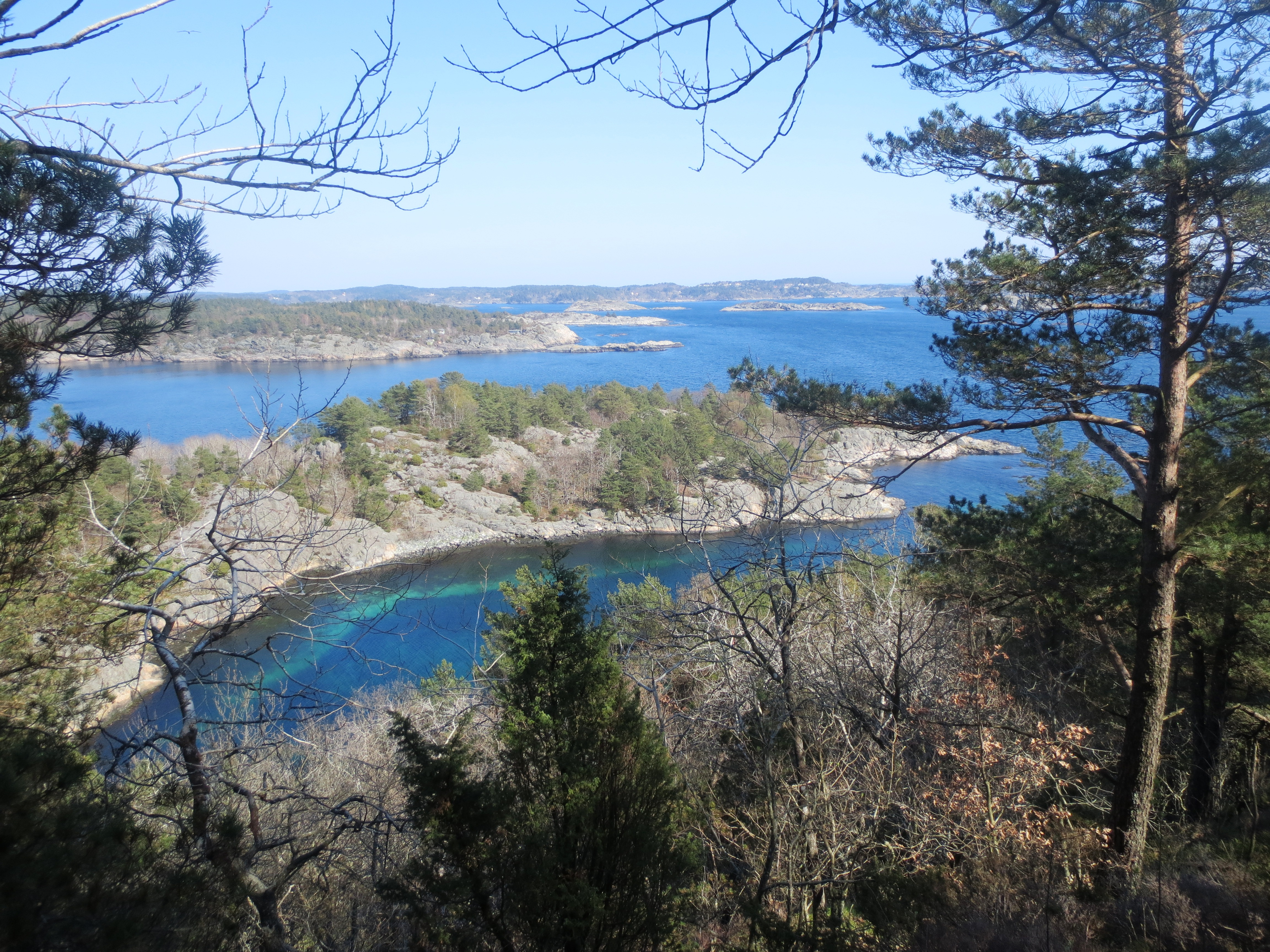
- View of the fjord
- Location: Agder county, Norway
- Coordinates: 58.1384°N 08.1896°E
- Type: Fjord
- Primary outflows: Skagerrak
- Basin countries: Norway
- Max. length: 8 kilometres (5.0 mi)
- Max. width: 2 kilometres (1.2 mi)

Location
- Interactive map of the fjord

Kvåsefjorden is an approximately 8-kilometre (5.0 mi) long fjord in Agder county, Norway. It forms part of the border between Lillesand Municipality and Kristiansand Municipality. The district of Randesund lies on the west side of the fjord in Kristiansand Municipality.

The fjord empties into the Skagerrak at Meholmen near Ulvøysund, which is considered to be the western starting point of the Blindleia strait. Blindleia is the inner shipping route along the coast of Lillesand Municipality. The smaller Isefjærfjorden is a branch off the main Kvåsefjorden. Kvåsefjorden can sometimes be harsh and difficult to cross with small boats, because it is wide open to the Skagerrak and there is no archipelago to protect it unlike in the nearby Blindleia.

== See also ==
- List of Norwegian fjords
