= Outport =

Secondary or auxiliary port

An outport is any port considered secondary to a main port (including a provincial one as opposed to a capital one). It often is a small port built to support the commercial operations of a large port. The Port of Tilbury from the Port of London is a good example. Avonmouth for Bristol and, on a smaller and now historical scale, Fordwich for Canterbury are others.

== See also ==
- Newfoundland outport, a small coastal community in the Canadian province of Newfoundland and Labrador other than the chief port of St. John's
