= Høvåg (village) =

Village in Lillesand Municipality, Norway

- Village
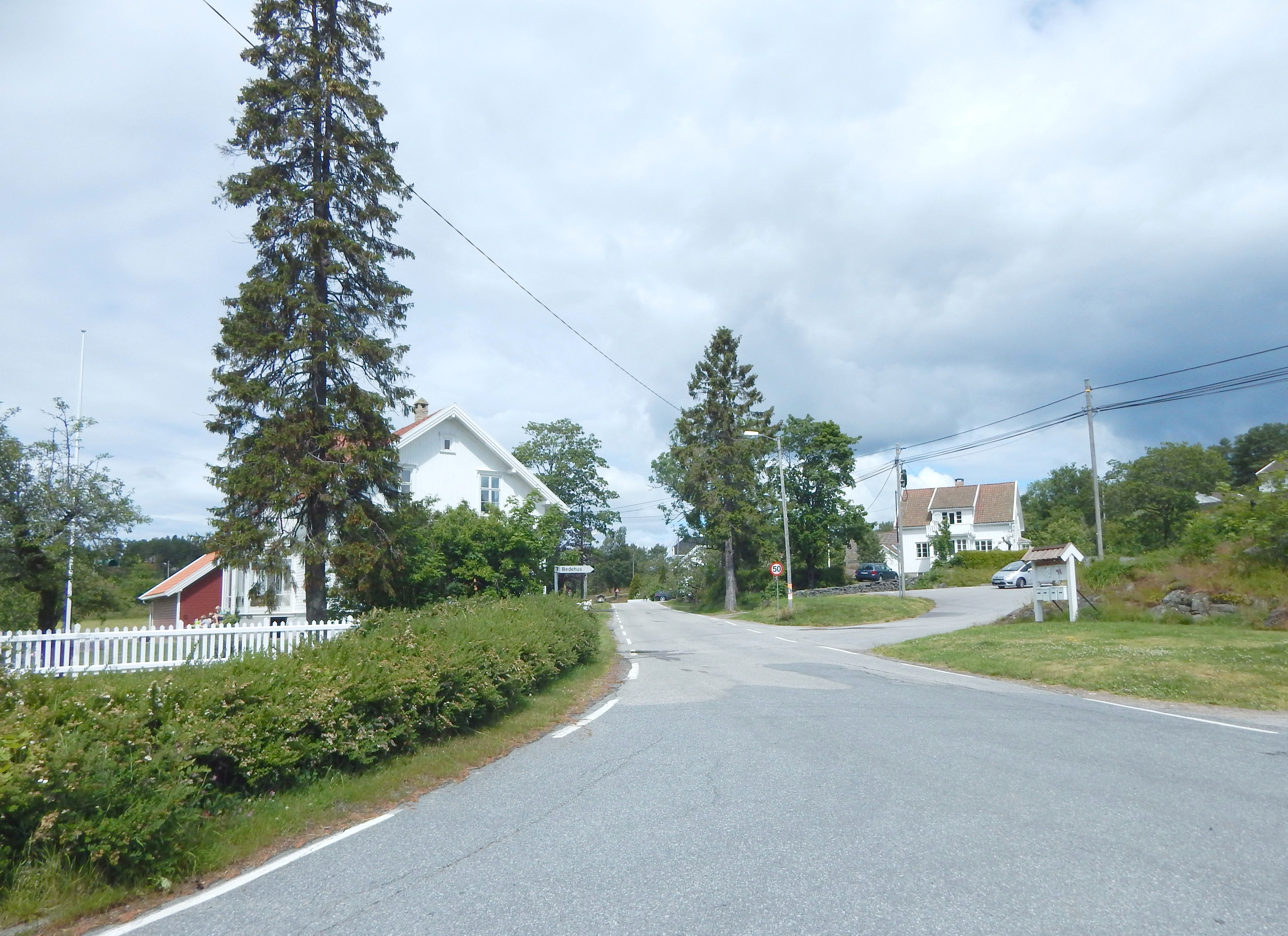
- View of the road leading to the village
- Interactive map of Høvåg
- Coordinates: 58.1712°N 08.2459°E
- Country: Norway
- Region: Southern Norway
- County: Agder
- Municipality: Lillesand Municipality

Area
  - Total: 0.35 km^{2} (0.14 sq mi)
- Elevation: 20 m (66 ft)

Population (2025)
  - Total: 377
  - Density: 1,077/km^{2} (2,790/sq mi)
- Time zone: UTC+01:00 (CET)
  - Summer (DST): UTC+02:00 (CEST)
- Post Code: 4770 Høvåg

Høvåg is a village in Lillesand Municipality in Agder county, Norway. The village is located about 12 kilometres (7.5 mi) southwest of the town of Lillesand and about 15 kilometres (9.3 mi) northeast of the city of Kristiansand. The village lies on the northern shore of the Kjerkekilen, a strait leading from the Blindleia to the Isefjorden. The village is the site of Høvåg Church.

The 0.35-square-kilometre (86-acre) village has a population (2025) of 377 and a population density of 1,077 inhabitants per square kilometre (2,790/sq mi).

== History ==
From 1865 until 1962, the village of Høvåg was the administrative centre of the old Høvåg Municipality.
