= Celo =

Celo may refer to:

- Celo Community, a communal settlement in the Western mountains of North Carolina
  - Camp Celo, a privately owned Quaker-based summer camp in Celo Community
- Alain Celo (born 1960), French composer and violist

== See also ==
- Čelo (disambiguation)
- Çelo (born 1977), Albanian singer and model
- Celos (disambiguation)
- Cello (disambiguation)
- Chelo (disambiguation)
- Cielo (disambiguation)
