= Envy (disambiguation) =

Envy is an emotion, evoked when one person strongly desires what another has.

Envy or Envious may also refer to:

== People and characters ==
=== Persons ===
- DJ Envy (born 1977), an American DJ and radio personality
- Envy (English rapper) (born 1987)

=== Fictional characters ===
- Envy (エンヴィー, Envī), a Fullmetal Alchemist anime-manga character
- Envy, a character from the 2024 animated film Inside Out 2
- Natalie "Envy" Adams, a character from the graphic novel series Scott Pilgrim, portrayed by Brie Larson in the film adaptation Scott Pilgrim vs. the World

== Places ==
- Envy, Switzerland
- Envy, U.S. Virgin Islands
- Værøy Airport (ICAO airport code ENVY), an airport formerly serving Værøy, Nordland, Norway

== Arts, entertainment, media ==
- Envy (novel) (Zavist'), a 1927 novel by Yuri Olesha

=== Film and television ===
- Envy (1999 film), an Australian drama film
- Envy (2004 film), an American comedy film
- Envy (2009 film), a Turkish drama film
- Envious (TV series), an Argentine comedy drama television series

=== Music ===
==== Groups or bands ====
- Envy, American band consisting of Rhonni and Gina Stile
- Envy (band), a Japanese post-hardcore band
- Nico & Vinz or Envy, a Norwegian hip-hop duo

==== Albums ====
- Envy (Ambitious Lovers album) (1984)
- Envy (Eve's Plum album) (1993)

==== Songs ====
- "Envy", a song appearing on Lunch. Drunk. Love. by Bowling For Soup
- "Envy", a movie theme by Dan Navarro, from the 2004 film Envy
- "Envy" (song), a song by Ash
- Envious (song), a single by Dawn Robinson

== Other uses ==
- Envy (apple), a trademarked brand of the Scilate apple variety, a cross between Royal Gala and Braeburn
- Envy (dinghy), a type of fibreglass sailing dinghy
- Envy in Christianity, one of the seven deadly sins
- HP Envy, a line of laptops by Hewlett-Packard
- Team Envy, an international eSports organization based in the United States

== See also ==
- Jealousy (disambiguation)
- Jealous (disambiguation)
