= Yates Center Carnegie Library =

- U.S. National Register of Historic Places
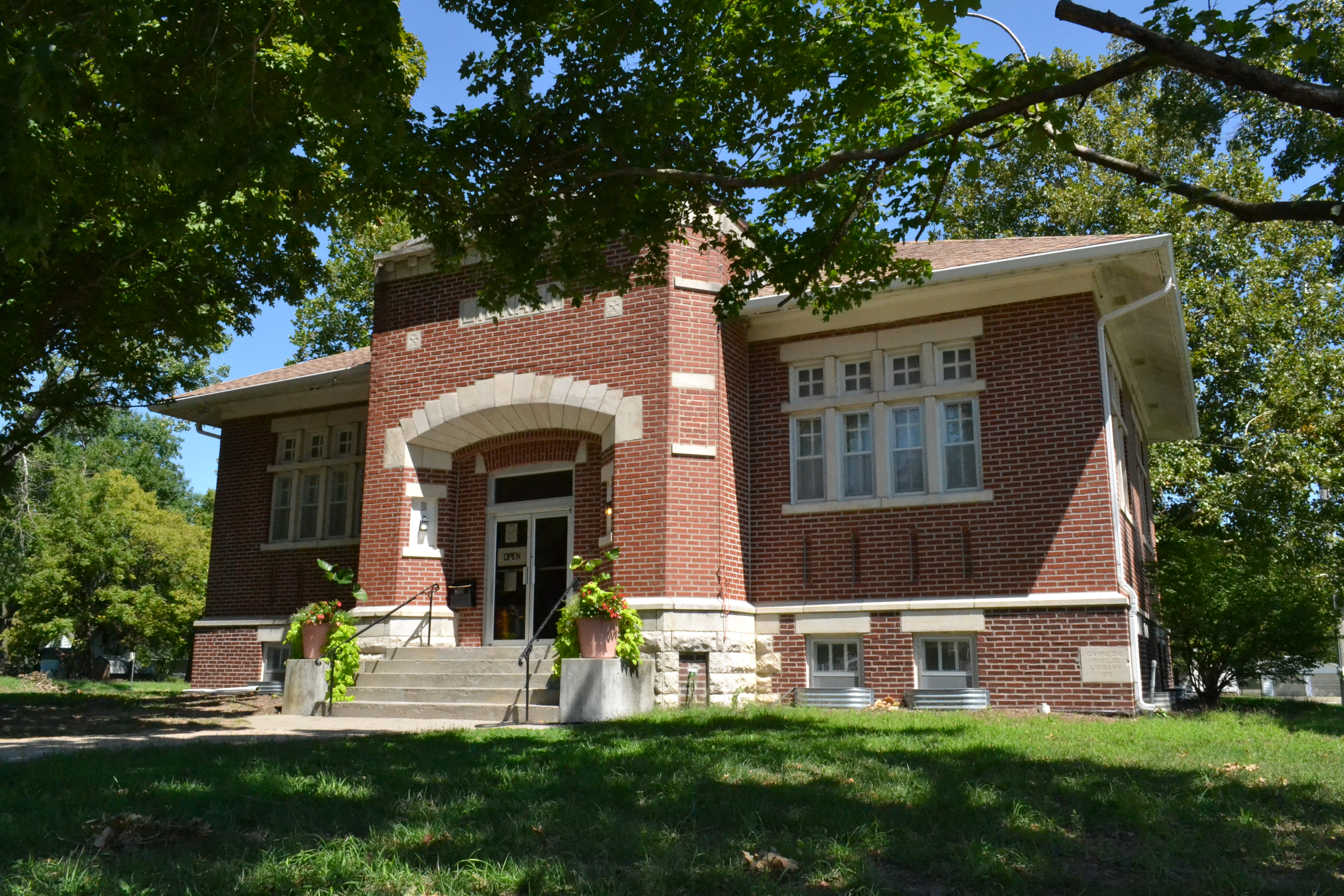
- The Yates Center Carnegie Library in 2017

- Location within Kansas Location within the United States
- Location: 218 N. Main, Yates Center, Kansas
- Coordinates: 37°53′0″N 95°43′54″W
- Area: Less than one acre
- Built: c. 1912
- Architect: A. T. Simmons
- MPS: Carnegie Libraries of Kansas TR
- NRHP reference No.: 87000974
- Added to NRHP: June 25, 1987

The Yates Center Carnegie Library, located at 218 N. Main in Yates Center in Woodson County, Kansas, is a Carnegie library which was built in about 1912. It was listed on the National Register of Historic Places in 1987.

It is a one-story red brick building on a raised foundation. Designed by architect A. T. Simmons, it is about 52 by 32 feet (15.8 m × 9.8 m) in plan. It has a five-sided projecting entry bay.

Simmons designed five other Carnegie libraries in Kansas, including two other NRHP-listed ones: Council Grove Carnegie Library and Downs Carnegie Library.
