= Čelopek =

Čelopek (Cyrillic: Челопек) may refer to:

- Čelopek, Brvenica, Republic of North Macedonia
- Čelopek, Zvornik, Bosnia and Herzegovina
- Čelopek, Lipljan, the Serbian name for a populated place in Kosovo (Albanian name Qellopek, Lipjan)
- Čelopek, Peć, the Serbian name for a populated place in Kosovo (Albanian name Çallapek, Pejë)
- Čelopek, Staro Nagoričane, Municipality of Staro Nagoričane, Republic of North Macedonia
- Chelopek, Bulgaria

== See also ==
- Fight on Čelopek (1905), between Serbian and Ottoman forces
- Čelo (disambiguation)
