= Oskaloosa Monthly Meeting of Friends Parsonage =

Historic house in Iowa, United States

- U.S. National Register of Historic Places
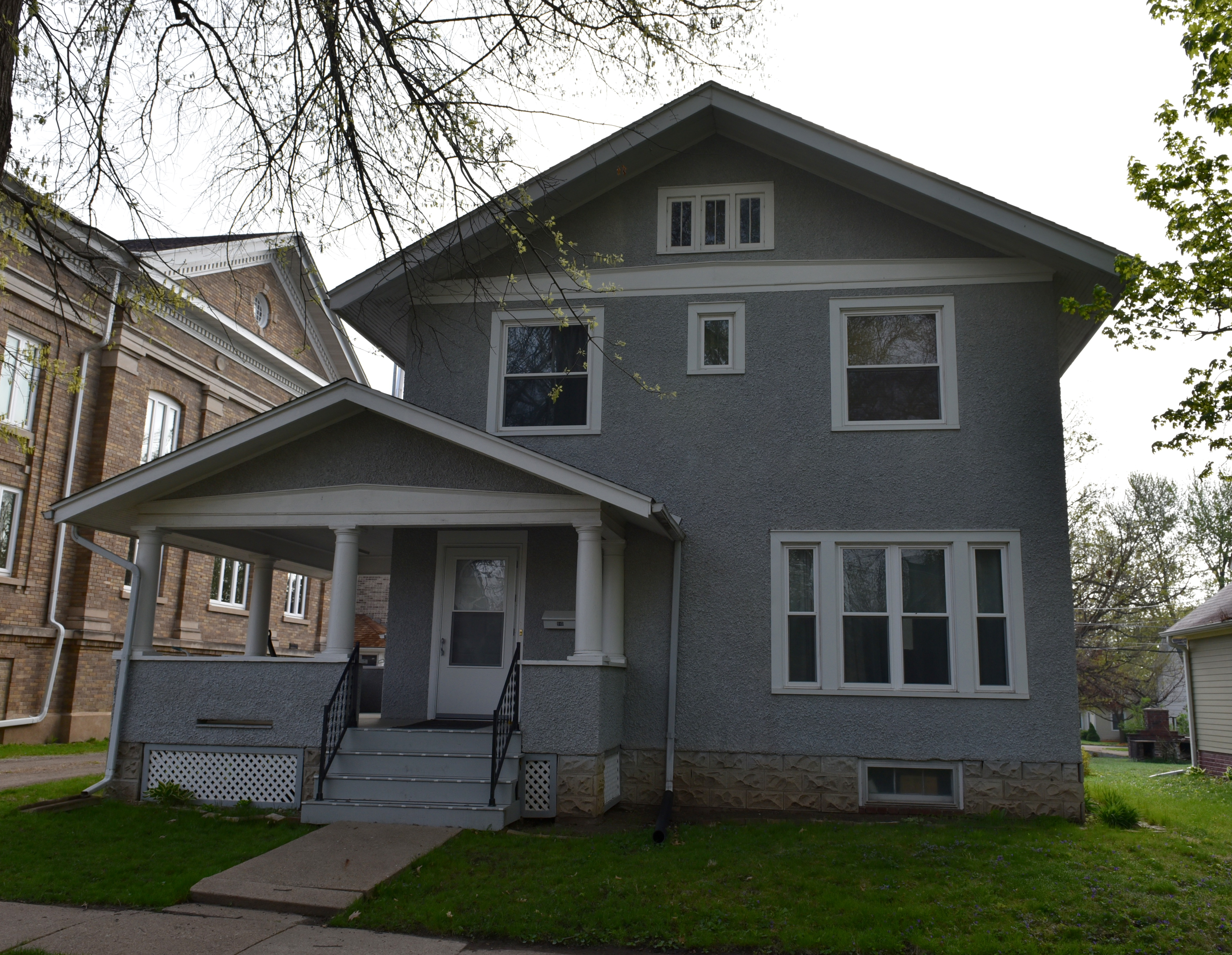

- Location within Iowa Location within the United States
- Location: 910 N. C St. Oskaloosa, Iowa
- Coordinates: 41°18′11″N 92°38′54″W
- Area: less than one acre
- Built: 1915
- Architect: A. T. Simmons
- Architectural style: Prairie School
- MPS: Quaker Testimony in Oskaloosa MPS
- NRHP reference No.: 96000348
- Added to NRHP: March 29, 1996

The Oskaloosa Monthly Meeting of Friends Parsonage is a historic building located in Oskaloosa, Iowa, United States. Its historic significance is found in its association with nearby William Penn University in the context of the Quaker testimony in Oskaloosa. The country's entry into World War I created problems for the Quaker's Peace Testimony. The Oskaloosa Monthly Meeting counseled students from the college about military conscription and pacifism. Because of this the parsonage was vandalized in 1917 with yellow crosses painted on the house. The congregation's pastor, Clarence Pickett, was tied to a spring wagon and led through town. Some vandalism also occurred during World War II, including yellow paint smeared on the parsonage.

The house is a two-story frame structure that is covered with stucco. It was designed in the Prairie School style by Bloomington, Illinois architect A. T. Simmons. He designed the neighboring Iowa Yearly Meeting House-College Avenue Friends Church three years previous. Completed in 1915, it is a single-family house that features a gable-end facade, concrete block foundation, several ribbon windows, and a wrap-around front porch with a gable-end roof. It was listed on the National Register of Historic Places in 1996.
