= Čelo =

Čelo means "forehead" in the Slavic languages. It may refer to:

- Toško Čelo, a settlement in Slovenia
- Gornje Čelo and Donje Čelo, Koločep, Croatia
- Čelo Grave, a grave in Podbeže, Slovenia

== See also ==
- Celo (disambiguation)
- Čelo (disambiguation)
- Çelo (born 1977), Albanian singer and model
- Celos (disambiguation)
- Cello (disambiguation)
- Chelo (disambiguation)
- Cielo (disambiguation)
- Tamburica
