= Chelo =

Chelo may refer to:

== People ==
- Chelo Alonso (1933–2019), Cuban actress Isabel Apolonia García Hernández, who worked in Italian cinema
- Chelo Alvarez-Stehle, Spanish and American journalist and documentary filmmaker
- Chelo García-Cortés (born 1951), Spanish journalist María Consolación García-Cortés Cadavid
- Marcello Pisas (born 1977), football goalkeeper from Curaçao
- Consuelo Silva (born 1922), American singer of Mexican bolero music
- Chelo Vivares (born 1952), Spanish actress and voice actress Consuelo Vivares
- Chelo (American singer), American singer, rapper and choreographer
- Chelo (Mexican singer) (born 1943), Mexican singer, songwriter and actress
- Isaac Chelo, 14th century Spanish rabbi and the alleged author of a forged travel itinerary

== Places ==
- Chelo District, Khuzestan Province, Iran
  - Chelo Rural District, Chelo District

== See also ==
- Celo (disambiguation)
- Čelo (disambiguation)
- Cello (disambiguation)
- The affix -chelo-
