= Chase County Courthouse =

Chase County Courthouse may refer to:

- Chase County Courthouse (Kansas), Cottonwood Falls, Kansas
- Chase County Courthouse (Nebraska), Imperial, Nebraska
