= Circles (Heroes & Zeros EP) =

Studio album by Heroes & Zeros
- Released: 5 June 2006
- Genres: Alternative rock Indie rock
- Labels: Heroes & Zeros Music
- Producer: Thomas Tofte

Heroes & Zeros chronology
Wakeup Call (2003)	Circles (2006)	Strange Constellations (2007)

Circles is the debut EP by the Norwegian indie rock group Heroes & Zeros, released in 2006 on their own label. All music was composed by Hans Jørgen Undelstvedt, Lars Løberg Tofte, and Arne Kjelsrud Mathisen. The EP received positive reviews in the Norwegian press.

== Track listing ==
No.	Title	Length
1.	“Circles”	3:22
2.	“Rupture 180”	3:17
3.	“Intermission”	1:30
4.	“Over the Moon”	3:43
5.	“Come Home”	13:16
