= Jalouse =

Jalouse may refer to:

- Jalouse (film), a 2017 French comedy film
- Jalouse (magazine), a defunct French fashion magazine

== See also ==
- HMS Jalouse
- Jalousie (disambiguation)
