= Iowa Yearly Meeting House-College Avenue Friends Church =

- Iowa Yearly Meeting House; College Avenue Friends Church
- U.S. National Register of Historic Places
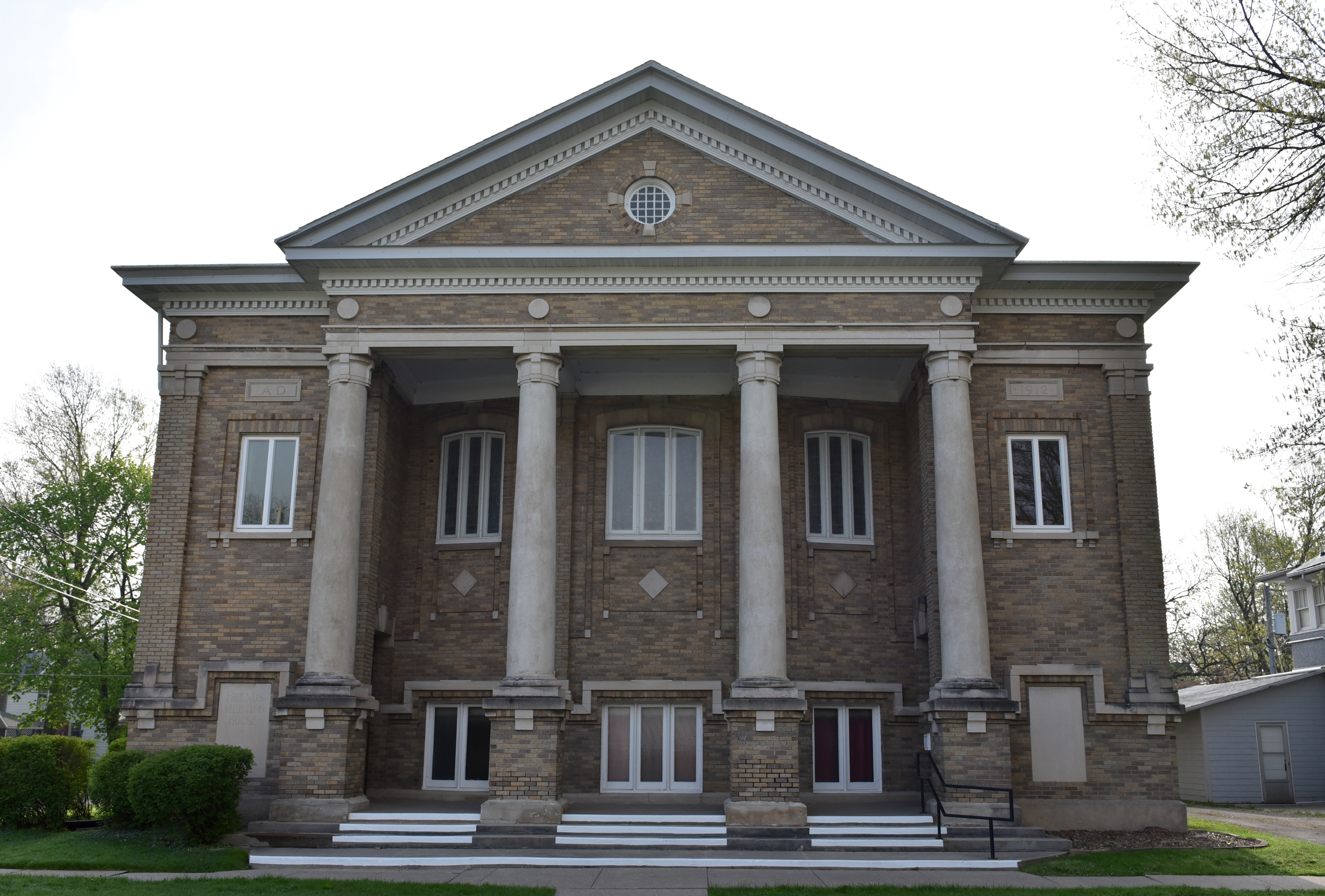

- Location within Iowa Location within the United States
- Location: 912 N. C St. Oskaloosa, Iowa
- Coordinates: 41.303333°N 92.648056°W
- Area: less than one acre
- Built: 1913
- Built by: R.A. Winters
- Architect: A. T. Simmons
- Architectural style: Colonial Revival
- MPS: Quaker Testimony in Oskaloosa MPS
- NRHP reference No.: 96000344
- Added to NRHP: March 29, 1996

Iowa Yearly Meeting House-College Avenue Friends Church is a historic church building located in Oskaloosa, Iowa, United States. The Colonial Revival structure was designed by Bloomington, Illinois architect A. T. Simmons, and completed in 1913. As their membership declined, Quakers in Iowa decided to concentrate on a few fundamental tenets of their faith, but gave way on their traditional concerns about simplicity and restraint. This more elaborate building replaced a simple 2½-story, brick and stone structure that was completed in 1865. The building project was a cooperative arraignment that included the Yearly Meeting, the Monthly Meeting, and nearby William Penn College. Oskaloosa had been chosen as the location of the Iowa Yearly Meeting, or the denominational headquarters, because of its central location to where the Quakers settled west of the Mississippi River. The previous building had separate meeting facilities for men and women, and this one does not. That separation was no longer considered necessary by the time this building was built. It was listed on the National Register of Historic Places in 1996.

== See also ==
- Whittier Friends Meeting House
- Honey Creek Friends' Meetinghouse
- Indiana Yearly Meeting
