= Emmetsburg Public Library =

- U.S. National Register of Historic Places
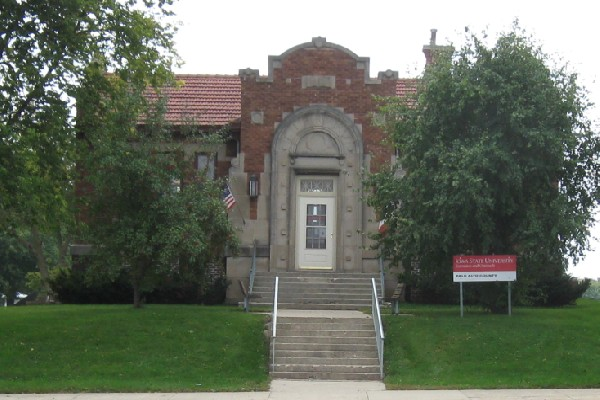

- Location within Iowa Location within the United States
- Location: 10th St. on Courthouse Sq., Emmetsburg, Iowa
- Coordinates: 43°06′38″N 94°40′37″W
- Area: less than one acre
- Built: 1911-1912
- Architect: A. T. Simmons
- NRHP reference No.: 83000397
- Added to NRHP: May 23, 1983

Emmetsburg Public Library was at a historic building located in Emmetsburg, Iowa, United States. A former Carnegie library, it sits on the square behind the Palo Alto County Courthouse. Andrew Carnegie had accepted Emmetsburg's application for a grant for $10,000 on February 20, 1911. The building is significant for its architecture. It was designed by Bloomington, Illinois architect A. T. Simmons and completed in 1912. The brick, side gable structure has a projecting entrance on the long side of the building. A string course encircles the building, engaging the lintels of the windows. The building was listed on the National Register of Historic Places in 1983.

The Library is no longer at this location but attached to the Iowa Lakes Community College.
