= Cellophane (disambiguation) =

Cellophane is a thin transparent sheet made from regenerated cellulose.

Cellophane may also refer to:

== Artists ==
- Cellophane (band), a Californian rock band

== Albums ==
- Cellophane (Holy Holy album), 2023
- Cellophane (The Troggs album), 1967
- Cellophane, by Ashley Slater, 2008

== Songs ==
- "Cellophane" (FKA Twigs song), 2019
- "Cellophane", by King Gizzard & the Lizard Wizard from I'm in Your Mind Fuzz, 2014
- "Cellophane", by Heroes & Zeros from Strange Constellations, 2006
- "Cellophane", by That Petrol Emotion from End of the Millennium Psychosis Blues, 1988
- "Cellophane", by Sia from 1000 Forms of Fear, 2014

== Other uses ==
- Cellophane, a novel by Marie Arana, 2006

== See also ==
- Cellophane noodles, a type of transparent noodle
