= Strange Constellations (Heroes & Zeros album) =

2007 studio album by Heroes & Zeros

Studio album by Heroes & Zeros
- Released: 23 April 2007
- Genre: Alternative rock; indie rock
- Label: Nightliner Records/Universal

Heroes & Zeros chronology
Circles (2006)	Strange Constellations (2007)	Simian Vices Modern Devices (2009)

Strange Constellations is the first studio album by the Norwegian indie rock group Heroes & Zeros, released on 23 April 2007. All lyrics were written by Hans Jørgen Undelstvedt, all music by Hans Jørgen Undelstvedt, Lars Løberg Tofte, and Arne Kjelsrud Mathisen.

== Track listing ==
#	Track name	Length
1.	"Into the Light"	3:48
2.	"A Strange Constellation"	4:21
3.	"Headlong Kicks"	4:43
4.	"Oslo Fadeout"	2:50
5.	"The FoolProof"	5:16
6.	"The Argument"	4:25
7.	"Cellophane"	3:03
8.	"Two More Weeks"	4:49
9.	"The Thin Line"	5:19
10.	"Do This Right"	6:35
