= I'm Jealous (disambiguation) =

"I'm Jealous" is a 1995 song by the Australian band Divinyls.

I'm Jealous may also refer to:

- "I'm Jealous" (Ike & Tina Turner song), 1961
- "I'm Jealous", a song by Shania Twain from the album Up!, 2002
- "Baby, I'm Jealous", a 2020 song by Bebe Rexha and Doja Cat

== See also ==
- Jealous (disambiguation)
