= Dundy County Courthouse =

- U.S. National Register of Historic Places
- U.S. Historic district
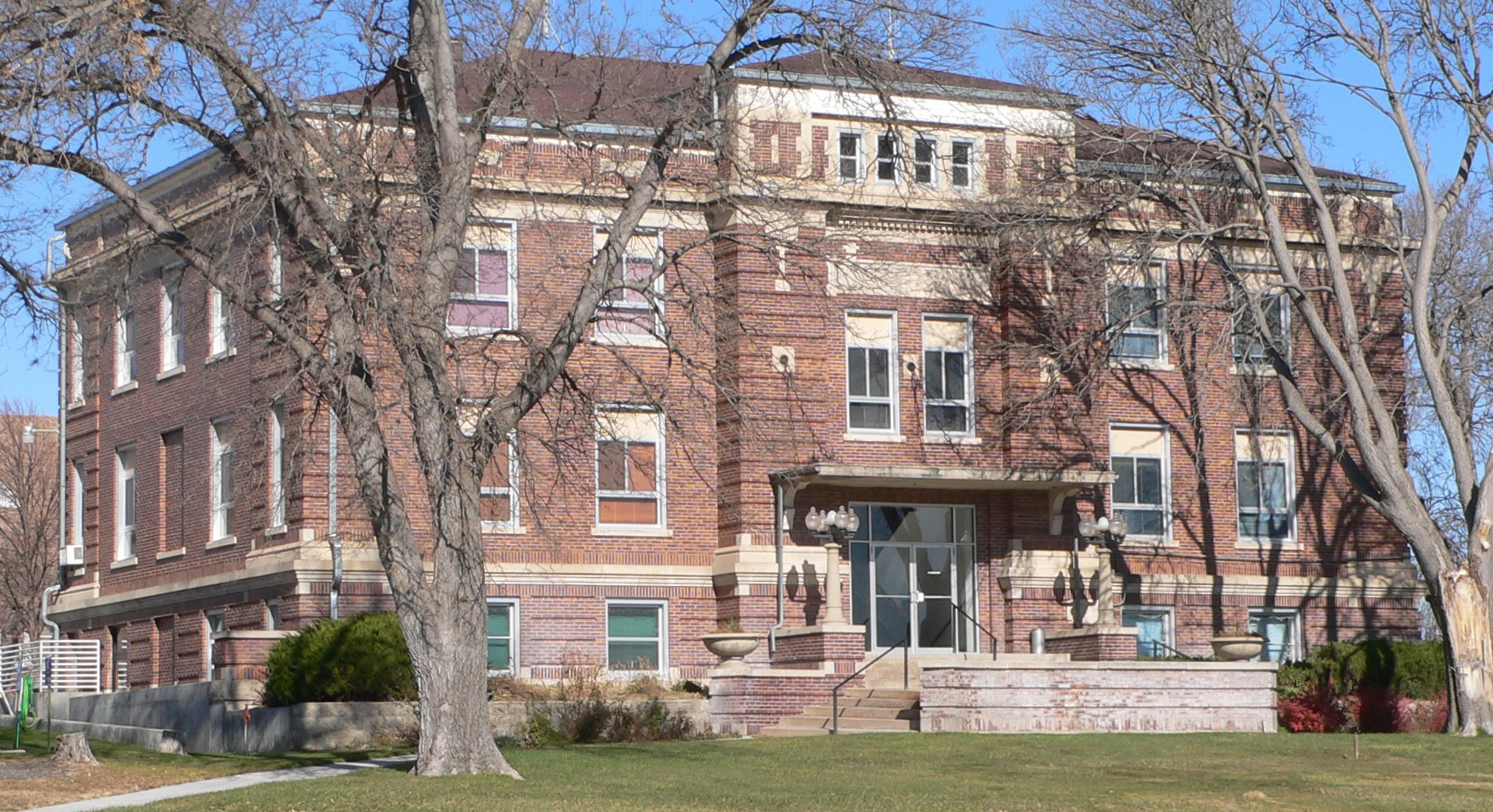

- Location within Nebraska Location within the United States
- Location: W. 7th Ave. and Chief St., Benkelman, Nebraska
- Coordinates: 40°3′2″N 101°31′59″W
- Area: 2 acres (0.81 ha)
- Built: 1921
- Built by: Simmons, A. T.
- Architectural style: Late 19th and Early 20th Century American Movements
- MPS: County Courthouses of Nebraska MPS
- NRHP reference No.: 89002237
- Added to NRHP: January 10, 1990

The Dundy County Courthouse, located at West 7th Avenue and Chief Street in Benkelman, Nebraska, was built in 1921.

It is significant for association with government and for its architecture. Relative to other Nebraska "county citadel"-type courthouses, it has an unusual degree of geometric ornamentation.

It was designed by architect A. T. Simmons of Bloomington, Illinois, who had previously designed the Chase County Courthouse in adjacent Chase County, Nebraska.

It was listed on the National Register of Historic Places in 1990.
