= Jealousy (disambiguation) =

Jealousy is an emotion.

Jealousy may also refer to:

== Film ==
- Jealousy (1912 film), an American silent film
- Jealousy (1916 film), an American silent film
- Jealousy (1922 film), a Polish silent film
- Jealousy (1923 film), a Swedish silent film by Victor Sjöström
- Jealousy (1925 film), a German silent comedy by Karl Grune
- Variety (1925 film) or Jealousy, a German silent drama by Ewald Andre Dupont
- Jealousy (1929 film), an American sound film
- Jealousy (1931 film), a British drama film
- Jealousy (1934 film), an American drama film
- Jealousy (1942 film), an Italian film
- Jealousy (1945 film), an American drama film
- Jealousy (1953 Finnish film), a drama film by Teuvo Tulio
- Jealousy (1953 Italian film), a drama film by Pietro Germi
- Jealousy (1999 film), a Spanish drama film
- Jealousy (2013 film), a French film directed by Philippe Garrel

== Music ==
- Jealousy, a 2000s band that included Tila Tequila
- "Jealousy", an orchestral composition by Leoš Janáček, originally intended as prelude for his opera Jenůfa

=== Albums ===
- Jealousy (Dirt Band album), 1981
- Jealousy (X Japan album), 1991
- Jealousy (EP), by Loudness, 1988

=== Songs ===
- "Jealousy" (Martin Solveig song), 2005
- "Jealousy" (Offset and Cardi B song), 2023
- "Jealousy" (Pale Waves song), 2022
- "Jealousy" (Pet Shop Boys song), 1990
- "Jealousy" (Queen song), 1979
- "Jealousy" (Sparkadia song), 2008
- "Jealousy" (Will Young song), 2011
- "Jalousie 'Tango Tzigane'", a 1925 composition by Jacob Gade, recorded with English lyrics by Frankie Laine (1951) and Billy Fury (1961)
- "Jealousy", by Amii Stewart from Paradise Bird, 1979
- "Jealousy", by Brokencyde from I'm Not a Fan, But the Kids Like It!, 2009
- "Jealousy", by Death from Individual Thought Patterns, 1993
- "Jealousy", by Disciples, 2017
- "Jealousy", by Frankie Miller, 1982
- "Jealousy", by Isabella Manfredi, 2021
- "Jealousy", by Monsta X, 2018
- "Jealousy", by Natalie Merchant from Tigerlily, 1995
- "Jealousy", by Paris Hilton from Paris, 2006
- "Jealousy", by Status Quo from 1+9+8+2, 1982
- "Jealousy", by Stereophonics from You Gotta Go There to Come Back, 2003
- "Jealousy", by Van Morrison from Latest Record Project, Volume 1, 2021

== Other uses ==
- Jealousy, United States Virgin Islands, a settlement
- Jealousy (horse) (1854–?), British Thoroughbred racehorse
- Jealousy (Munch), a painting by Edvard Munch
- La Jalousie (Jealousy), a novel by Alain Robbe-Grillet
- Jealousy (book), by Nancy Friday
- Hey Jealousy, a song by American rock band Gin Blossoms

== See also ==
- Jealous (disambiguation)
- Jalousie (disambiguation)
- Celos (disambiguation), Spanish term for jealousy
