= A. T. Simmons =

American architect

Aaron T. Simmons, most commonly known as A. T. Simmons, was an American architect. He designed 71 Carnegie libraries, numerous courthouses, schools, churches and other public buildings, and most of the houses in the Cedar Crest area of Normal, Illinois.

A number of his works are listed on the U.S. National Register of Historic Places. Simmons designed six Carnegie libraries in Kansas: in Abilene, Chanute, Council Grove, Downs, Hays and Yates Center.

Works include (with attribution):

- Emmetsburg Public Library (1912), 10th St. on Courthouse Sq., Emmetsburg, Iowa (Simmons, A. T.), NRHP-listed
- Yates Center Carnegie Library (c.1912), 218 N. Main, Yates Center, Kansas (Simmons, A. T.), NRHP-listed
- Dundy County Courthouse (1921), W. 7th Ave. and Chief St., Benkelman, Nebraska (Simmons, A. T.), NRHP-listed
- Ayer Public Library, 200 Locust St., Delavan, Illinois (Simmons, A. T.), NRHP-listed
- Numerous works in Cedar Crest Addition Historic District, roughly bounded by Constitutional Trail, Division St., Highland Ave. and Fell Ave., Normal, Illinois (Simmons, Aaron T.), NRHP-listed
- Chardon Courthouse Square District, Public Green, roughly bounded by Main and Center Sts., Chardon, Ohio (Herricks & Simmons), NRHP-listed
- Chase County Courthouse, Broadway between 9th and 10th Sts., Imperial, Nebraska (Simmons, A. T.), NRHP-listed
- Council Grove Carnegie Library, 303 W. Main, Council Grove, Kansas (Simmons, A. T.), NRHP-listed
- Downs Carnegie Library, 504 S. Morgan, Downs, Kansas (Simmons, A. T.), NRHP-listed
- Iowa Yearly Meeting House-College Avenue Friends Church, 912 N. C St., Oskaloosa, Iowa (Simmons, A. T.), NRHP-listed
- Oskaloosa Monthly Meeting of Friends Parsonage, 910 N. C St., Oskaloosa, Iowa (Simmons, A. T.), NRHP-listed
- One or more works in Penn College Historic District, 201 Trueblood Ave., Oskaloosa, Iowa (Simmons, A. T., and Proudfoot), NRHP-listed
