= Celo Community =

Communal settlement in North Carolina, US

Celo Community, Inc.
- Communal settlement
- Location within North Carolina
- Coordinates: 35.83°N 82.18°W
- Country: United States
- State: North Carolina
- County: Yancey County
- Established: 1937; 89 years ago
- Founder: Arthur Ernest Morgan

Area
  - Total: 1.9 sq mi (4.9 km^{2})
- Postal code: 28714

Celo Community, Incorporated (/ˈsiːloʊ/ SEE-loh) is a communal settlement in the Western mountains of North Carolina, United States, located in the South Toe River valley of Yancey County, in the South Toe Township between the unincorporated areas of Celo and Hamrick. It was founded in 1937 by Arthur Ernest Morgan. Celo is a land trust with its own rules of taxation and land tenure that runs its internal government by consensus. The community does not require its members to accept any religion or ideology, but is based on ideals of cooperation between residents and care for the natural environment. However, its membership is predominantly Quakers. Celo has 40 families living on its 1,200 acres (4.9 km^{2}).

== Mission and goals ==
The Celo Community Constitution states as its overriding purpose “to provide an opportunity for its members to enjoy a life that includes personal expression, neighborly friendship and cooperation, and appreciative care of the natural environment.”

In 1959, the community restated its goals. Among these were “to pay allegiance to our common humanity overshadowing religious, racial, economic or political differences.” Members are expected to work “at a calling that will provide simple but adequate living…to raise some of their own food and in doing so to conserve rather than deplete the land.” The community also stated as a central goal “to rear our children in a wholesome environment where they can become acquainted with nature and be stimulated by intellectual freedom.”

Historically and today, cooperation has been at the forefront of the community's mission. Founder Arthur Morgan explained the cooperative element of Celo by employing a metaphor, which he named “human uranium.” Morgan explained that although a cubic yard of granite contains enough uranium to blow up a mountain, the particles have no effect when separated. Only when brought together, in what is called a “critical mass,” can they exercise power. Morgan saw people in the same way: when brought together with common goals and ideals they have great power.

Examples of Celo's cooperative element include a food co-op, a cooperative retail crafts store, and Cabin Fever University, a program for sharing knowledge and skills as well as for organizing social events.

== Operations ==
The community is based on a land trust system, by which members may own personal homes, but the land itself (including the land under those homes) is owned by the community. Land is never sold to members, but is assigned for periods of time on the condition that members live harmoniously with the land and their neighbors. Money is occasionally lent to community members for the purpose of improving land. In the words of the Celo Community Constitution, this system is meant to “encourage personal enterprise among members by making land and money available” for productive use.

The Community does not provide jobs for its residents. Members have worked on the community running Camp Celo, organizing cottage industries, and working for the settlement itself. Members also work off of the community. At times the work of the community has benefited the wider area. In 1962 Celo Community members Elizabeth and Ernest Morgan founded the Arthur Morgan School, a Quaker boarding school for students in 7th-9th grades. Physicians at Celo once ran a clinic open to people from outside the community and offering medical services for relatively low prices.

The Community accepts new members by consensus. A vote is held at regular meetings of the community. New admits must receive an affirmative vote with no more than fifteen percent of those present and voting dissenting. Members may also vote to dismiss members from the community.

== History ==
In 1936, wealthy Chicago industrialist William H. Regnery was looking for a social project to fund. He asked a friend, Arthur Morgan, to suggest one. Morgan suggested he underwrite the founding of an intentional community. Regnery's beliefs seemed, at first glance, to clash with Morgan's vision for a communal settlement: he was a conservative and mild anti-Semite who opposed the New Deal and Franklin D. Roosevelt. However, his belief in the virtue of self-reliant rural farmers overrode all of these characteristics, and he agreed. With his philanthropy, Celo was on its way.

Morgan, Regnery, and Morgan's son, Griscom Morgan, chose the land that would become Celo. A board of directors was formed, including among its members Morgan, Regnery, and Clarence Pickett, executive secretary of the American Friends Service Committee.

During the first few years, Celo experienced frequent turnover of residents and difficulty in recruitment of members as the community struggled to establish a clear identity and direction. During this time, Celo also suffered from attacks for its opposition to World War II.

In the midst of World War II, Morgan visited Civilian Public Service camps in an attempt to recruit community members. He told the conscientious objectors confined there about Celo, and invited them to move to the community when the war ended. This group proved a receptive audience, and when the war ended several families moved to the community. Celo had a stable population by 1948. In that year, Camp Celo, a Quaker summer camp, was established by Doug and Ruby Moody on a holding of community land.

In these early years, Celo was populated mostly with Quakers and pacifists, a legacy left by Morgan's recruitment in the conscientious objector camps. Early growth was constant, but slowed during the 1950s due to conflicts with ex-members. By the 1960s however, national movements of communal living, back-to-the-land, and radicalism led the population to flourish once again.

In 2021, Celo was home to 79 adult members. The community has a slow membership process, and has a waiting list of families hoping to be admitted. Families who are unable to live at Celo due to a long waiting list have begun settling on the community's periphery.

== Climate ==
According to the Köppen Climate Classification system, Celo has an oceanic climate, abbreviated "Cfb" on climate maps. The highest temperature recorded in Celo was 97 °F (36.1 °C) on June 25–26, 1952 and June 28, 1952, while the lowest temperature recorded was −16 °F (−26.7 °C) on January 21, 1985.

Climate data for Celo, North Carolina, 1991–2020 normals, extremes 1948–present
| Month | Jan | Feb | Mar | Apr | May | Jun | Jul | Aug | Sep | Oct | Nov | Dec | Year |
|---|---|---|---|---|---|---|---|---|---|---|---|---|---|
| Record high °F (°C) | 80 (27) | 81 (27) | 86 (30) | 89 (32) | 91 (33) | 97 (36) | 96 (36) | 95 (35) | 94 (34) | 88 (31) | 80 (27) | 77 (25) | 97 (36) |
| Mean maximum °F (°C) | 65.8 (18.8) | 67.2 (19.6) | 76.1 (24.5) | 81.9 (27.7) | 84.4 (29.1) | 86.8 (30.4) | 88.0 (31.1) | 86.9 (30.5) | 84.2 (29.0) | 79.0 (26.1) | 72.5 (22.5) | 66.9 (19.4) | 89.3 (31.8) |
| Mean daily maximum °F (°C) | 44.9 (7.2) | 48.7 (9.3) | 55.8 (13.2) | 65.1 (18.4) | 71.0 (21.7) | 76.3 (24.6) | 79.4 (26.3) | 78.0 (25.6) | 73.1 (22.8) | 64.7 (18.2) | 55.8 (13.2) | 48.3 (9.1) | 63.4 (17.5) |
| Daily mean °F (°C) | 33.8 (1.0) | 37.4 (3.0) | 43.8 (6.6) | 52.4 (11.3) | 59.7 (15.4) | 65.9 (18.8) | 69.3 (20.7) | 68.1 (20.1) | 62.6 (17.0) | 52.8 (11.6) | 43.2 (6.2) | 37.1 (2.8) | 52.2 (11.2) |
| Mean daily minimum °F (°C) | 22.7 (−5.2) | 26.0 (−3.3) | 31.8 (−0.1) | 39.6 (4.2) | 48.4 (9.1) | 55.5 (13.1) | 59.3 (15.2) | 58.3 (14.6) | 52.1 (11.2) | 40.9 (4.9) | 30.6 (−0.8) | 25.9 (−3.4) | 40.9 (5.0) |
| Mean minimum °F (°C) | 5.2 (−14.9) | 10.5 (−11.9) | 16.9 (−8.4) | 26.5 (−3.1) | 34.8 (1.6) | 44.8 (7.1) | 51.7 (10.9) | 49.4 (9.7) | 39.0 (3.9) | 26.4 (−3.1) | 17.9 (−7.8) | 10.7 (−11.8) | 2.7 (−16.3) |
| Record low °F (°C) | −16 (−27) | −9 (−23) | −7 (−22) | 11 (−12) | 19 (−7) | 29 (−2) | 32 (0) | 32 (0) | 27 (−3) | 9 (−13) | −1 (−18) | −14 (−26) | −16 (−27) |
| Average precipitation inches (mm) | 5.87 (149) | 4.64 (118) | 5.27 (134) | 5.98 (152) | 5.90 (150) | 5.77 (147) | 5.77 (147) | 5.62 (143) | 6.00 (152) | 4.29 (109) | 4.52 (115) | 4.71 (120) | 64.34 (1,636) |
| Average snowfall inches (cm) | 4.2 (11) | 2.3 (5.8) | 3.3 (8.4) | 0.5 (1.3) | 0.0 (0.0) | 0.0 (0.0) | 0.0 (0.0) | 0.0 (0.0) | 0.0 (0.0) | 0.0 (0.0) | 0.2 (0.51) | 2.2 (5.6) | 12.7 (32.61) |
| Average precipitation days (≥ 0.01 in) | 9.7 | 9.5 | 11.1 | 10.6 | 11.5 | 12.8 | 12.3 | 12.5 | 9.5 | 7.0 | 8.3 | 9.9 | 124.7 |
| Average snowy days (≥ 0.1 in) | 1.7 | 1.2 | 0.7 | 0.2 | 0.0 | 0.0 | 0.0 | 0.0 | 0.0 | 0.0 | 0.2 | 1.3 | 5.3 |
Source 1: NOAA
Source 2: National Weather Service

== See also ==
- Camp Celo
- List of intentional communities
