= Jalousie (disambiguation) =

Jalousie may refer to:

- Jalousie window
- Jalousie (Gade), a tango written by composer Jacob Gade
- La Jalousie, a 1957 novel by Alain Robbe-Grillet
- Jalousie, is a song by French singer Priscilla

== See also ==
- Jalouse (disambiguation)
- Jealousy (disambiguation)
