= Arthur Ernest Morgan =

First Chairman, Tennessee Valley Authority

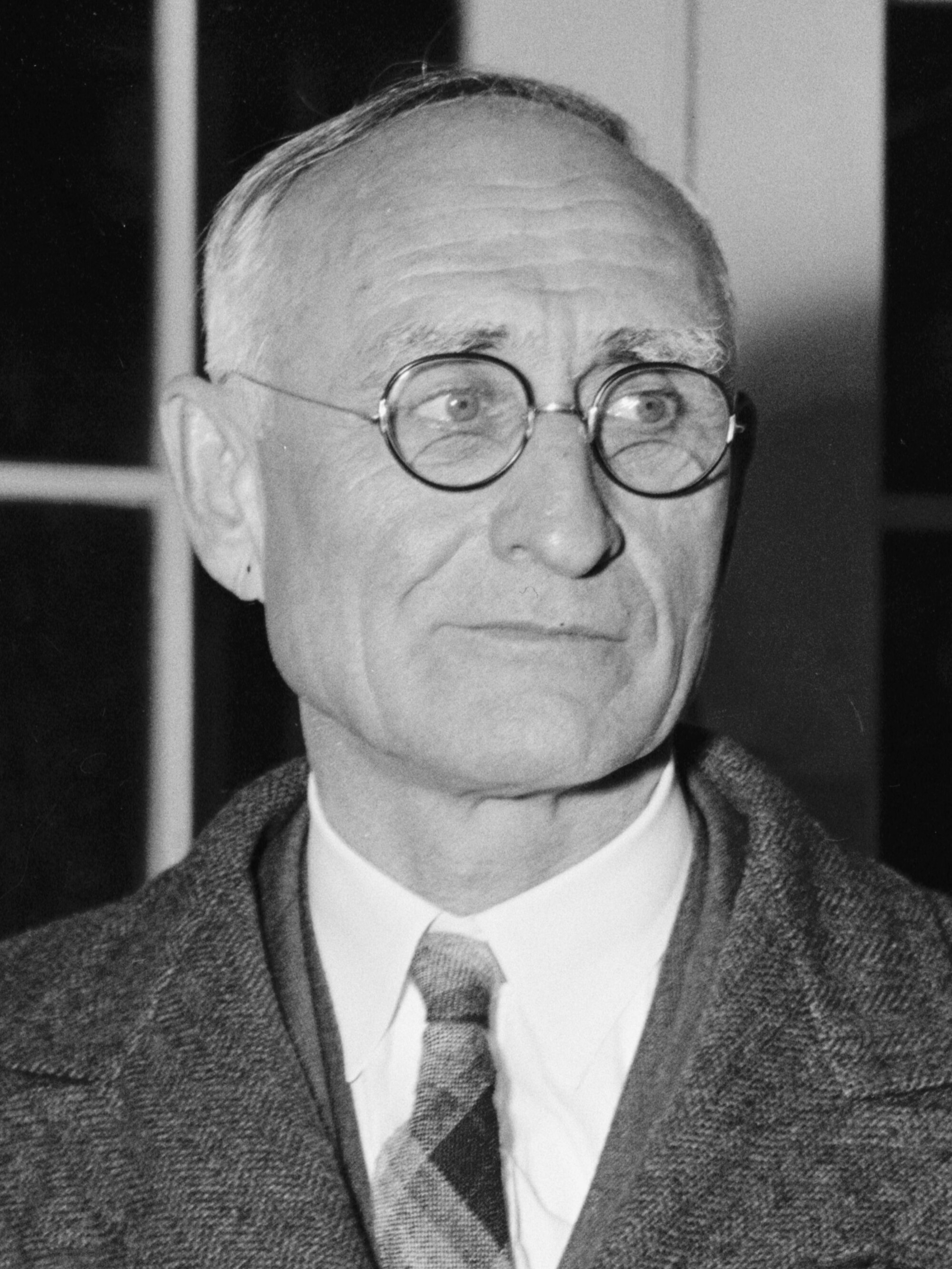
- Morgan in 1938

Chairman of the Tennessee Valley Authority
- In office May 18, 1933 – March 23, 1938
- President: Franklin D. Roosevelt
- Preceded by: Office established
- Succeeded by: Harcourt Morgan

President of Antioch College
- In office 1920–1936
- Preceded by: William M. Dawson (acting)
- Succeeded by: Algo Henderson

Personal details
- Born: June 20, 1878 Hamilton County, Ohio
- Died: November 16, 1975 (aged 97) Xenia, Ohio
- Spouse(s): Urania T. Jones (d. 1905); Lucy Middleton Griscom (d. 1972)

Arthur Ernest Morgan (June 20, 1878 – November 16, 1975) was a civil engineer, U.S. administrator, and educator. He was the design engineer for the Miami Conservancy District flood control system and oversaw construction. He served as the president of Antioch College between 1920 and 1936. He was also the first chairman of Tennessee Valley Authority from 1933 until 1938 in which he used the concepts proven in his earlier work with the Miami Conservancy District.

== Early life ==
Arthur E. Morgan was born near Cincinnati, Ohio but his family soon moved to St. Cloud, Minnesota. After graduating from high school, he spent the next several years doing outdoors work in Colorado. During this time he learned that there was a dearth of practical understanding of hydraulic engineering. He returned home and took up practice with his father, learning about hydraulic engineering by apprenticeship. By 1910 he had founded his own firm and become an associate member of the American Society of Civil Engineers.

== Engineer ==
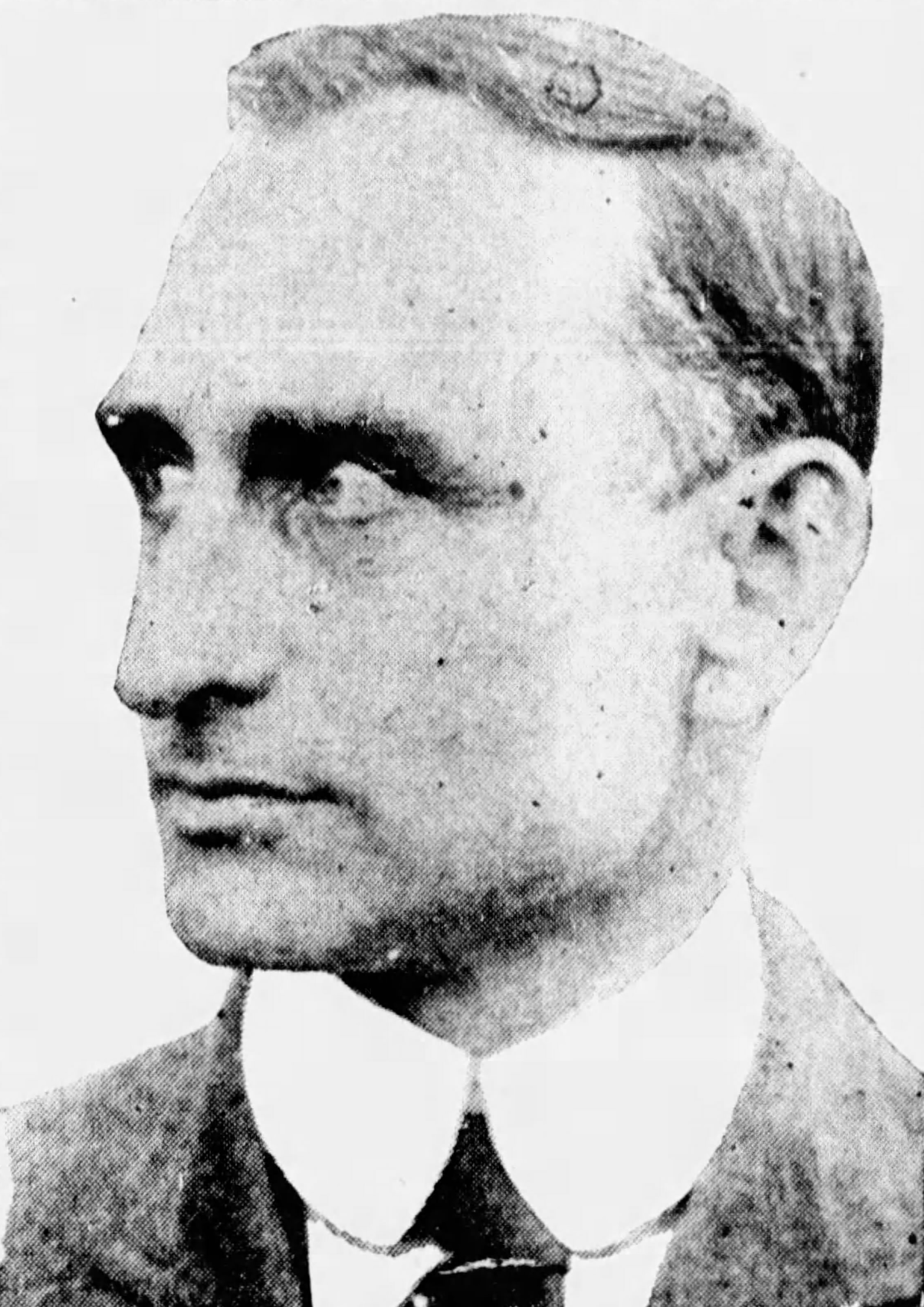
Morgan c. 1921

After the disastrous Great Dayton, Ohio Flood in 1913, Morgan proposed a system of dry earthen dams to control the river systems above Dayton. His concepts were challenged because of his lack of formal engineering training, but eventually his plans were adopted and constructed, and the subsequent years proved the effectiveness of his concepts. Because of this success, he was chosen in 1933 to design and deploy the Tennessee Valley system of dams for flood control and electrification.

== Educator ==
Always interested in progressive education, he sent his son Ernest to Marietta Johnson's Organic School in Fairhope, Alabama, a pioneering progressive boarding school. Morgan's first effort in education was to found the Moraine Park School, an experimental progressive school in Dayton, in 1917. In 1921, Morgan became the first president of The Association for the Advancement of Progressive Education, later renamed in 1931 as Progressive Education Association (PEA). In 1919, Morgan accepted the presidency of Antioch College to turn it around after a low point in the college's finances. Morgan replaced the existing board of trustees, which had been dominated by quarrelsome local ministers, with prominent businessmen such as Charles Kettering, who had also backed Morgan's efforts at the Moraine Park School. Between 1921 and 1933, board members and their friends donated more than $2 million to Antioch. Kettering alone donated $500,000. Morgan reorganized the educational program to include cooperative education and involved faculty in industrial research. The faculty, most personally chosen by Morgan, included not only academics but also architects, engineers, chemists, advertising executives, and government bureaucrats.

Until around the 1930s, Morgan was a member of the Unitarian Church. In his later life, Morgan was a Humanist Quaker, a member of the Society of Friends in Yellow Springs, Ohio, as was his son Ernest. After his departure from the TVA in 1938, Arthur Morgan was active in Quaker war relief efforts in Mexico and Finland. Among other accomplishments in the 1940s, he founded a non-profit organization to promote small communities (Community Service, Inc.), helped to set up a system of rural universities in India, and fought to protect Native American (Seneca) land from the flooding by the U.S. Army Corps of Engineers. Morgan was the author of more than twenty books. Two in the water field demonstrated his environmental orientation and his criticism of the Army Corps.

In 1962 Morgan's daughter-in-law, Elizabeth, with the help of his son Ernest, founded a progressive private school with humanist, Quaker, and Montessori influences, naming it the Arthur Morgan School.

Along with J.J. Tigert, Morgan served as a member of the Indian University Education Commission set up in 1948 with S. Radhakrishnan as a chair and Zakir Husain as a member. The commission studied Land-Grant colleges in agricultural education in the United States. He travelled across India in 1948 as part of the commission and also supported a community education initiative in Kerala called Mitraniketan begun by K. Viswanathan in 1965.

== Community organizer ==
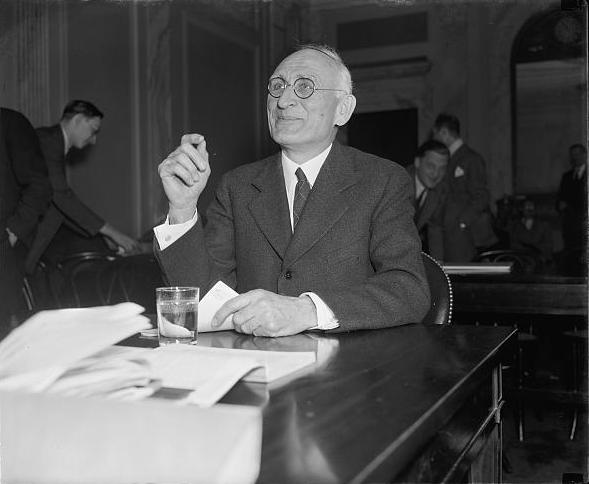
Dismissed as TVA Chairman by President Franklin D. Roosevelt, Morgan testifies before a committee of the United States Congress in 1938.

Morgan was a leading community organizer in the postwar period. He was deeply committed to community and greatly interested in community settlements. Heavily influenced by Edward Bellamy's Looking Backward, Morgan gained a reputation as a Utopian dreamer. This interest in community living, coupled with Morgan's belief in small towns and family life as the most virtuous form of living, led Morgan to participate in several projects that fostered rural community life.

As chairman of the TVA, he not only directed the building of dams and provided power; he promoted community living as well. Morgan advanced a wide variety of cooperative enterprises and cottage industries and created a number of planned towns that followed the English garden city model.

In 1937, Morgan founded Celo Community, a land trust in the mountains of Western North Carolina. The community, which still exists today, is a self-governed land trust. Although Celo does not require members to accept any particular religious creed or ideology, it is built on cooperation between members and care for the natural environment. Today, Celo is home to 40 families who live on its 1,000 acres (4 km^{2}).

In the 1940s, Morgan went on to found two organizations for the promotion of community, Community Service Inc. (CSI) in 1940, and in 1949 the Fellowship of Intentional Communities (FIC). CSI was created to advance family life and small towns, which Morgan saw as the necessary ingredients for a positive American future. The organization was founded on Morgan's belief in the importance of small towns to the rapidly urbanizing nation. Small towns, he argued, provided places for people to experience respect, cooperation, and personal relationships. In the same year, Morgan founded the Fellowship of Intentional Communities, an organization that fostered relationships between communal settlements. The FIC cultivated communication and the exchange of products between communities, promoted communication between communal settlements and the outside world, and advocated for the formation of new intentional communities.

== Racism and eugenics ==
From an early age, Morgan believed in the innate inferiority of certain races. In particular, he held the view that those of Asian and African descent were "the most unfit of all" peoples. To illustrate this point, Morgan once wrote that, "The extreme and universal immorality of the negro is a bigger blight on the country than people realize."

In addition to his belief in white supremacy, Morgan was also a leading proponent of eugenics and what he termed "euthenics". As such, he spoke widely of the need to both extinguish undesirable genetic traits seen among peoples of poor genetic stock and eliminate cultural traits seen among "uncivilized" peoples. With these views, Morgan became a leader in the eugenics movement, serving as a charter member and honorary president of the American Eugenics Society. Adolf Hitler cited the American eugenics movement as an inspiration for what became known as the Holocaust.

Morgan's views on race greatly informed his actions as head of the Tennessee Valley Authority, leading him to exclude Black Americans from employment and housing opportunities offered to whites by the "New Deal" program. As a result, all-white towns such as Norris, Tennessee came to characterize his vision for "model" communities. When sued by the NAACP for denying Black Americans equal access to jobs and housing, Morgan pushed back, claiming that "Blacks had to create their own opportunities." To this day, Norris Tennessee remains almost exclusively white, as documented in James W. Loewen's book "Sundown Towns."

Despite investigations demonstrating that Morgan's TVA had deliberately excluded Black Americans from the "New Deal" gains enjoyed by whites, Morgan remained defiant and unrepentant until his death in 1975. In his memoir of his TVA years, he denied any responsibility for the program's negative effects, claiming that there was nothing else he could do but to honor the attitudes of a racist, majority white America.

== Sources ==
- Bernstein, Mark (October 2005). "Arthur Ernest Morgan". American History. 40 (4): 48–76.
- Wilson, Edwin H. (1995). The Genesis of a Humanist Manifesto (in English). ISBN 0-931779-05-7, available online (information on Morgan's religion in the final chapter)
