= Downs Carnegie Library =

- U.S. National Register of Historic Places
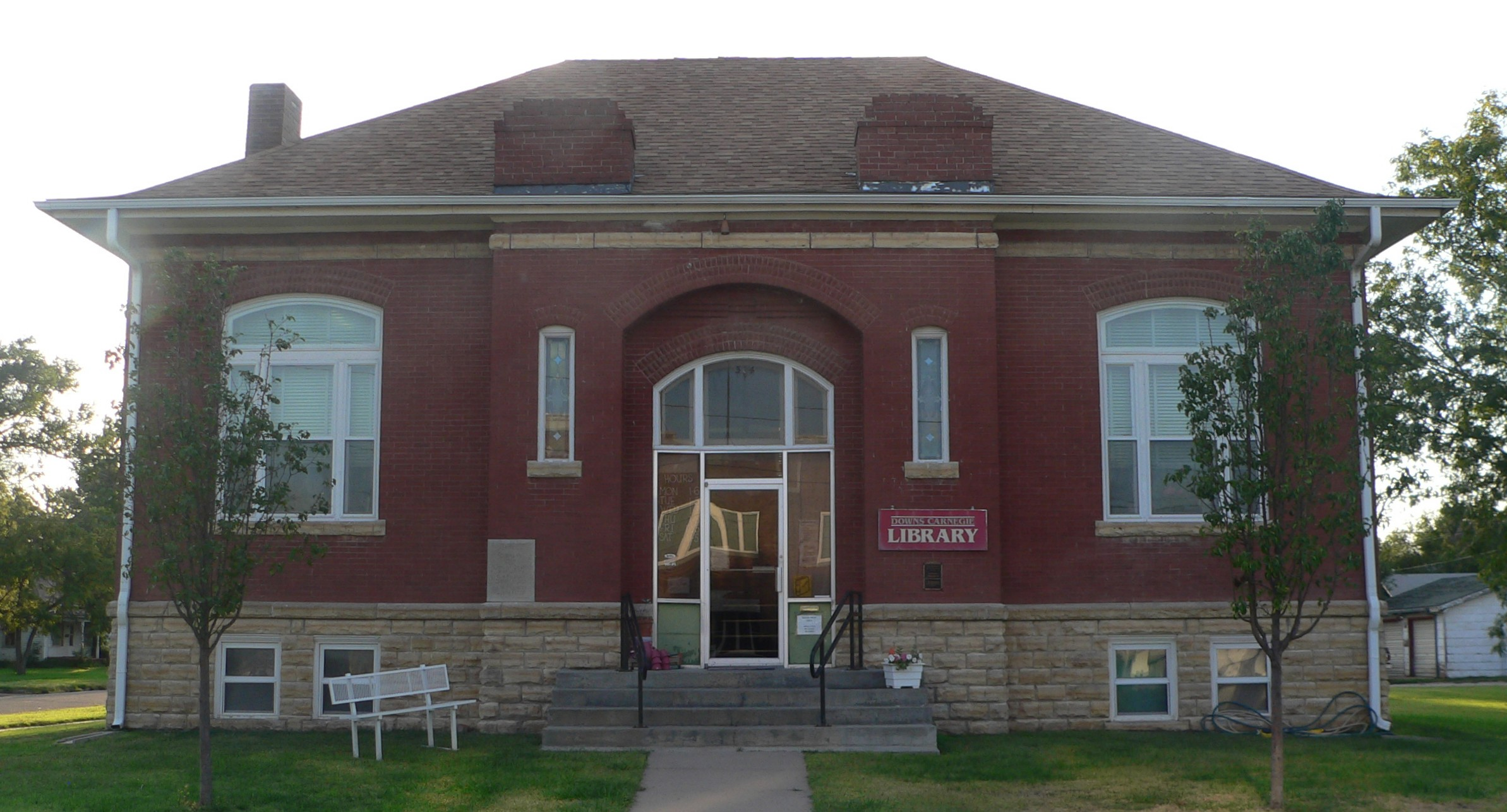

- Location within Kansas
- Location: 504 Morgan Ave; Downs, Kansas
- Coordinates: 39°30′14″N 98°32′40″W
- Area: less than one acre
- Built: 1906
- Built by: J.M. Kennedy
- Architect: A. T. Simmons
- MPS: Carnegie Libraries of Kansas TR
- NRHP reference No.: 87000966
- Added to NRHP: June 25, 1987

The Downs Carnegie Library in Downs, Kansas is a Carnegie library which was listed on the National Register of Historic Places in 1987.

== History ==
A library association was organized in 1903 to seek a Carnegie Foundation grant. It received a $6,140 grant in 1905.

The one-story red brick building was designed by architect A. T. Simmons of Bloomington, Illinois in an eclectic style. It has a raised rusticated limestone block foundation. It was completed around 1906, and is about 50 by 30 feet (15.2 m × 9.1 m) in plan.

It was listed on the National Register as part of a study on Carnegie libraries in Kansas.

As of 2022, it is still the Downs public library.
