= Heroes & Zeros =

Norwegian rock band

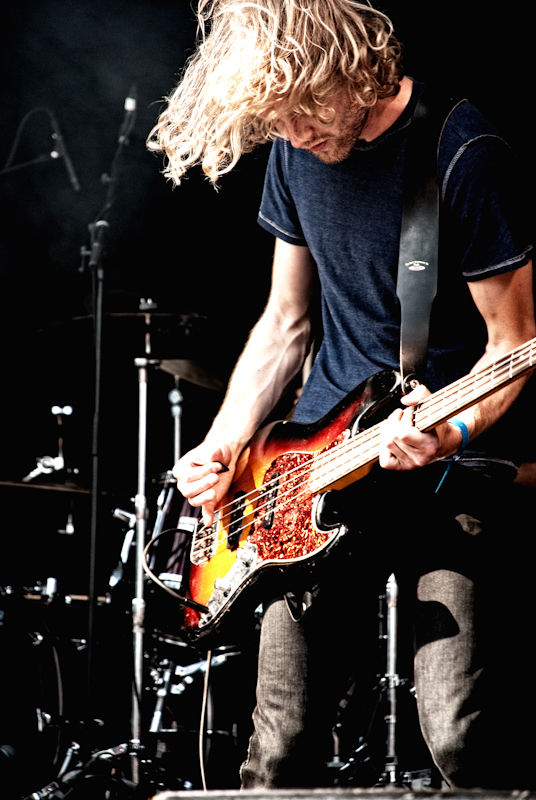
- Heroes & Zeros performing in 2009

Background information
- Origin: Lillesand, Norway
- Genres: Alternative rock; indie rock
- Years active: 2005–present
- Labels: Nightliner Records; Universal; Heroes & Zeros Music
- Members: Hans Jørgen Undelstvedt; Simen Krogstie Lagesen; Arne Kjelsrud Mathisen
- Past members: Lars Løberg Tofte
- Website: heroesandzeros.no

Heroes & Zeros is a rock band from Lillesand, Norway. The group was formed by Hans Jørgen Undelstvedt, Lars Løberg Tofte, and Arne Kjelsrud Mathisen in 2003. Tofte quit the band in 2010 and was replaced by Simen Krogstie Lagesen. They have released three studio albums, two EPs, and three live records.

== History ==
Heroes & Zeros formed in 2003 in Lillesand and they moved to Oslo soon after. In 2006, they won Norway's NRK Urørt music contest and subsequently went on a nationwide tour with Ralph Myerz and the Jack Herren Band and Minor Majority. They signed a record deal with Universal Music Norway the same year. Their debut EP, Circles, was released on the band's own label, Heroes & Zeros Music, in 2006. Their first full-length album, Strange Constellations, came out a year later, published by Universal. It garnered the band two Spellemann prize nominations, and it was the best-selling rock debut album in Norway in 2007. The music video for the track "A Strange Constellation " was nominated for best music video at the Norwegian Short Film Festival in Grimstad.

The band's sophomore album, Simian Vices Modern Devices, came out in 2009 and was nominated for the Spellemann Prize 2009 in the category "Rock". The music video for "Cipramillion" was nominated for "Music Video of the Year" in Grimstad.

Heroes & Zeros' third studio album, Ghostly Kisses, came out in 2011.

== Band members ==
Current

- Hans Jørgen Undelstvedt – vocals, guitars, keyboards
- Simen Krogstie Lagesen – bass, keyboards
- Arne Kjelsrud Mathisen – drums, percussion, keyboards

Past

- Lars Løberg Tofte – bass, backing vocals, samples, keyboards

== Awards and recognition ==
- 2006 Årets ZoomUrørt 2006 – Best new live act of the year
- 2006 Årets Urørt 2006 – Newcomer of the year
- 2008 Nominated at the Spellemannprisen 2007 in the Newcomer of the year and Best Video categories
- 2010 Nominated at the Spellemannprisen 2009 in the Rock category
- 2010 Nominated for Best Music Video in the Norwegian short film festival in Grimstad

== Discography ==
Studio albums

- Strange Constellations (2007)
- Simian Vices Modern Devices (2009)
- Ghostly Kisses (2011)

EPs

- Circles (2006)
- The Jig Is Up Remix EP (2013)

Live albums

- In the Slipstream Vol. 1 – Live (2008)
- Heroes & Zeros and Harrys Gym: Live Slottsfjell 2009 (2009)
- In the Slipstream Vol. 2: Ghostly Kisses Live (2012)

Singles

- "Cellophane" (2005)
- "Into the light" (2007)
- "A Strange Constellation" (2007)
- "The Foolproof" (2007)
- "Oslo Fadeout" (2007)
- "Simian Vices" (2009)
- "Cipramillion" (2009)
- "Change Is Nothing" (2011)
