= Jealousy, U.S. Virgin Islands =

Coordinates: 17°44′08″N 64°48′14″W

Jealousy
- Village
- Interactive map of Jealousy
- Country: United States Virgin Islands
- Island: Saint Croix
- Time zone: UTC-4 (AST)

Jealousy is a settlement on the island of Saint Croix in the United States Virgin Islands.

== History ==
=== 18th century ===
Jealousy is a former sugar plantation. The 1750 map of Saint Croix attributes ownership to one Soren Reigg. This may be a misspelling of Søren Bagge (died November 17, 1775), a æawyer. who is later mentioned as the owner.

By 1790, Jealousy had been acquired by one MacDonough.

=== 19th century ===
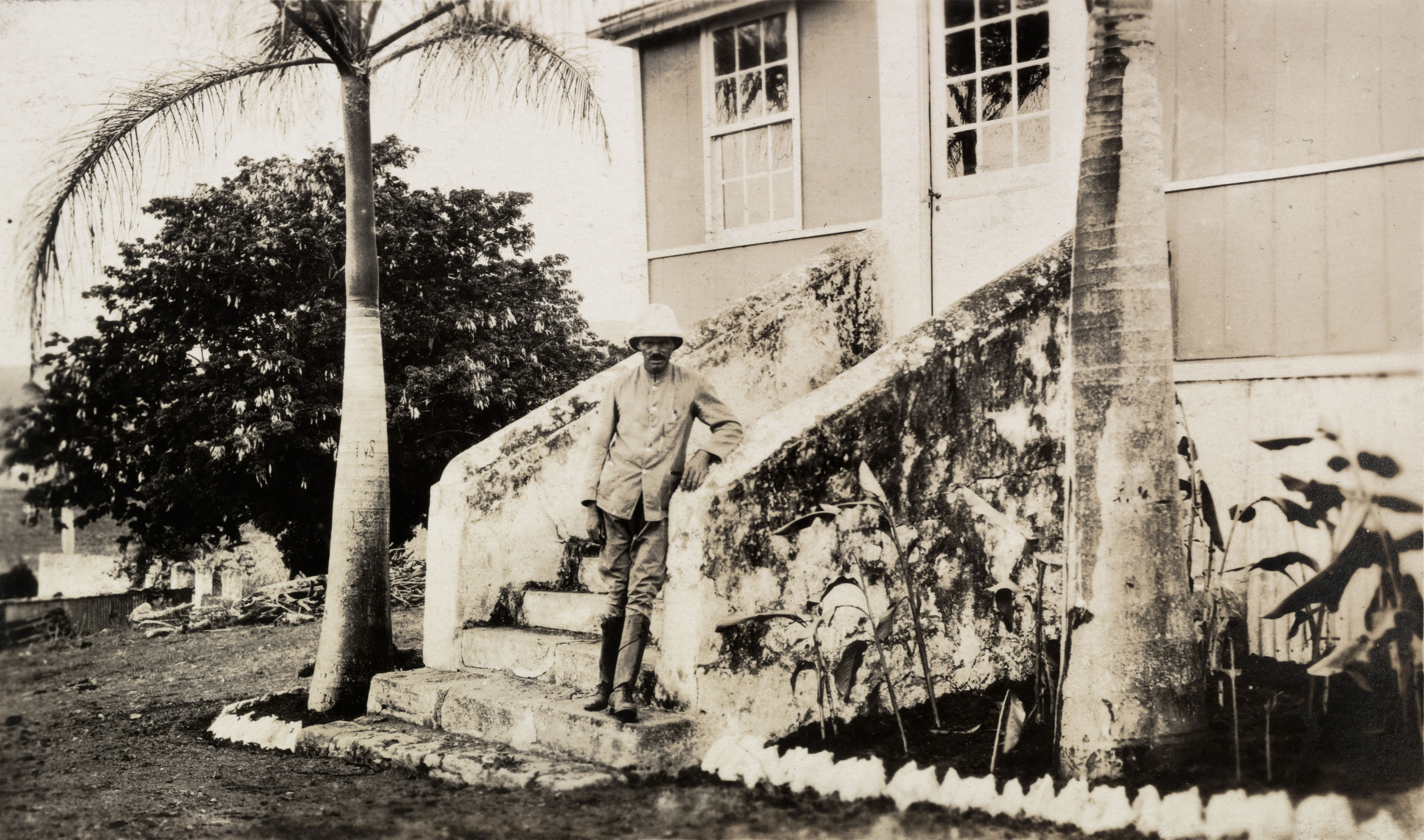
Jealousy in the 1920s or early 1930s.

In 1816, Jealousy (Princes Quarter No. 16 and 17, Centre Police District, Frederiksteds Jurisdiction) covered 300 acres of land of which 157 acres were planted with sugar cane and 143 acres were under other cultivation. 154 enslaved labourers were present on the estate.

Om 15 June 1832, Kealousy was sold at auction to Thomas Smith Barnes and Richard Foster Barnes, for Ps. 115,000. On 22 March 1844, it was sold at auction to George Nelthropp, for Ps. 60,100. On 15 September 1847, it was sold by George Nelthropp to Mrs. L. C. Lucas (with husband and curator) for Ps. 105,000.
