= William Penn University =

Private university in Oskaloosa, Iowa, US

- Former names: Penn College (1873–1933); William Penn College (1933–2000)
- Type: Private university
- Established: 1873
- Religious affiliation: Quakers
- President: John E.E. Ottosson
- Students: 1,372
- Location: Oskaloosa, Iowa, U.S. 41.3090°N 92.6481°W
- Campus: Rural
- Colors: Navy Blue & Gold
- Nickname: Statesmen
- Sporting affiliations: NAIA – Heart of America Conference
- Mascot: Statesmen
- Website: www.wmpenn.edu
- Penn College Historic District
- U.S. National Register of Historic Places
- U.S. Historic district
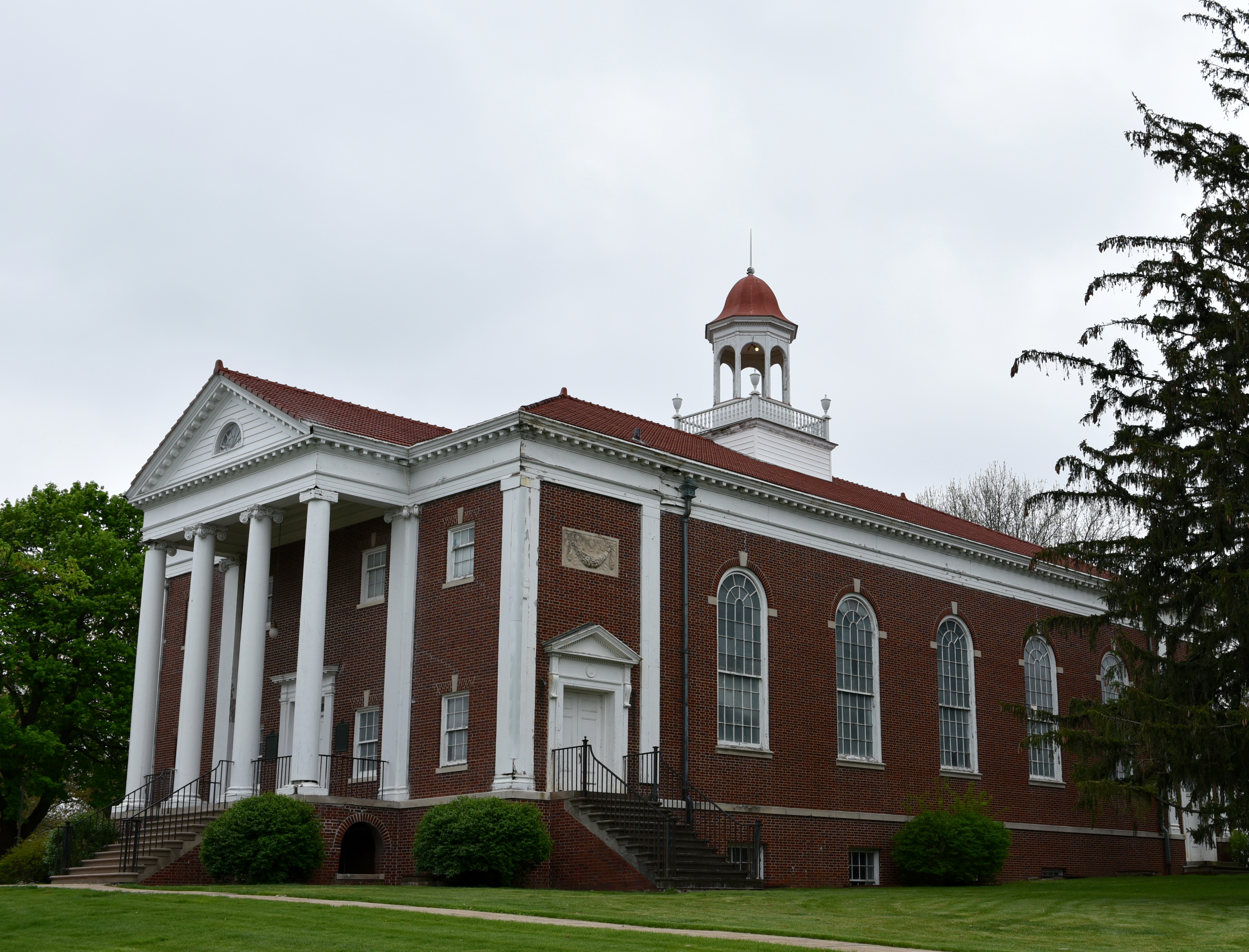
- Spencer Memorial Chapel, built 1923
- Area: 13.75 acres (5.56 ha)
- Architect: A. T. Simmons; Proudfoot, Bird and Rawson
- Architectural style: Prairie School; Colonial Revival
- MPS: Quaker Testimony in Oskaloosa MPS
- NRHP reference No.: 96000391
- Added to NRHP: April 4, 1996

William Penn University is a private university in Oskaloosa, Iowa, United States. It was founded by members of the Religious Society of Friends (Quakers) in 1873 as Penn College. In 1933, the name was changed to William Penn College, and finally to William Penn University in 2000.

== History ==
Originally founded as Penn College, William Penn University opened on September 24, 1873. The college's name was changed to William Penn College in 1933. In 2000, the name was changed again from William Penn College to William Penn University.

In 1916, a fire destroyed the original campus and caused two deaths when a four-ton bell crashed through the main building. Penn College's business manager Robert Williams and freshman student Harry Oakley were killed after being struck by the bell.

In 1995, William Penn's "College for Working Adults" was founded, which enrolls non-traditional students in an evening program of accelerated study. In January 2000 the university returned to the NAIA Division II. William Penn University is currently accredited by the Higher Learning Commission and a member of the North Central Association.

In 2007, Musco Lighting, an Oskaloosa based lighting manufacturer, donated $12 million to the school for various projects—the biggest single gift in the school's history. The money was to be used for 200,000 square feet (19,000 m^{2}) of new structures including student recreation, classrooms, laboratories, and a stand-alone Industrial Technology Center building called the Musco Technology Center (MTC), which is home for the expanding Digital Communication Program.

=== Historic district ===
Part of the campus has been set aside as a nationally recognized historic district that was listed on the National Register of Historic Places in 1996. At the time of its nomination, it contained ten resources, which included one contributing site, four contributing buildings, two contributing structures, two non-contributing buildings, and one non-contributing structure. The focus of the district is the Quadrangle, which is the main contributing site. Penn Hall (1917), Lewis Hall (1917), the Central Heating Plant (1917), and Spencer Memorial Chapel (1923) are the historic buildings. The historic structures are two Memorial Gates (c. 1918). Bloomington, Illinois architect A. T. Simmons designed the conceptual plan for the campus and the plans for individual buildings. He also designed the memorial gates; which were erected on May 20, 1918. The campus mainly features the use of Prairie School architecture.

== Athletics ==
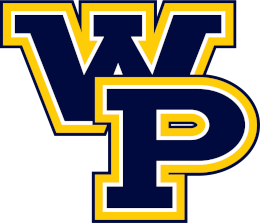
William Penn athletics logo

The William Penn athletic teams are called the Statesmen. The university is a member of the National Association of Intercollegiate Athletics (NAIA), primarily competing in the Heart of America Athletic Conference (The Heart) since the 2015–16 academic year. The Statesmen previously competed in the defunct Midwest Collegiate Conference (MCC) from 2001–02 to 2014–15 (when the conference dissolved); as well as in the Iowa Intercollegiate Athletic Conference (IIAC; now known as the American Rivers Conference since the 2018–19 academic year) of the NCAA Division III ranks from 1962–63 to 2000–01 (which they were a member on a previous stint from 1922–23 to 1953–54).

William Penn competes in 23 intercollegiate varsity sports: Men's sports include baseball, basketball, bowling, cross country, football, golf, lacrosse, soccer, track & field, volleyball and wrestling; while women's sports include basketball, bowling, cross country, golf, lacrosse, soccer, softball, track & field, volleyball and wrestling; and co-ed sports include cheer & dance and shotgun sports.

=== Men's basketball ===
The men's basketball teams have had significant success, finishing as the runner-up in the 2013 NAIA Division II men's basketball tournament. In 2014 William Penn set a record for points scored in the NAIA National Basketball Tournament.

=== Wrestling ===
Adaugo Nwachukwu was awarded the 2024 Anthony-Maroulis Trophy for her successes in women's wrestling.

== Notable people ==
- Joseph Benavidez, professional mixed martial artist
- Casey Fien, professional baseball player
- Vera Mae Green, notable anthropologist and Quaker
- John M. Haines, tenth governor of Idaho from 1913 to 1915
- Damon Harrison, professional football player
- Barb Kniff McCulla, member of the Iowa House of Representatives
- Jerry Kutzler, professional baseball player
- Clarence Pickett, 20th-century American Quaker
- Lilly Peckham Pickett, 20th-century American Quaker, graduated in 1908
- Antonio Pérez, educator
- Bruce Polen, college football player and coach
- Kevin Ritz, professional baseball player
- Andy Stokes, professional football player
- Rob Taylor, Iowa House of Representatives
- Ed Thomas, football coach
- D. Elton Trueblood, 20th-century American Quaker
- Abel Trujillo, four-time NAIA All-American wrestler; professional mixed martial artist
- Kamaru Usman, professional mixed martial artist, former UFC Welterweight Champion
- Thomas E. Watson, United States Marine Corps Lieutenant General, commander of the 2nd Marine Division during the Battle of Saipan in World War II
- Miriam Were, Kenyan public health advocate, academic, recipient of the first Hideyo Noguchi Africa Prize, and Nobel Peace Prize nominee
- Mary Chawner Woody, president, North Carolina Woman's Christian Temperance Union
- Wilbur Young, professional football player
