= Camp Celo =

Summer camp in North Carolina

- Established: 1948
- Founders: Doug and Ruby Moody
- Type: Co-ed summer camp
- Location: Celo, North Carolina, United States
- Coordinates: 35°49′23″N 82°11′16″W
- Affiliations: Religious Society of Friends
- Website: www.campcelo.com

Camp Celo is a privately owned Quaker-based summer camp for children aged 7–12 located in Celo Community of Yancey County, North Carolina.

== Program ==
Camp Celo offers a junior camp (for children ages 7–10) and a senior camp (ages 11 and 12), as well as an adventure camp for 13 and 14 year olds. Activities include camping, hiking, swimming, gardening, animal care, arts & crafts, wood shop, and field games. The camp operates a swimming hole on the South Toe River. Campers help maintain an organic garden and farm animals. Senior and Adventure campers participate in extensive backpacking trips in the nearby Black Mountains, Linville Gorge Wilderness, Wilson Creek Wilderness, and on the Appalachian Trail. The camp serves approximately 35 junior campers, 27 senior campers, and 12 adventure campers per session. About 325 campers attend each summer.

== History ==
Founded by Doug and Ruby Moody in 1948, Camp Celo has been operating under the current ownership of the Barrus/Perrin family since 1955.

== Philosophy ==
Camp Celo has been noted for its stances on a number of social issues, including racial integration, gender equality, nonviolence, and environmentalism. Much of its philosophy and traditions are based upon Quaker tradition.

== See also ==
- Arthur Morgan School
- Celo Community
