= Cello (disambiguation) =

A cello is stringed musical instrument.

Cello may also refer to:

- CELLO, a term for an esophageal abnormality
- Cello (album), an album by cellist David Darling
- Cello (film), a 2005 South Korean horror film
- Cello (TV series), a Lebanese drama television series with Ali Saad
- Cello (web browser), an early web browser and Gopher client for Windows 3.1
- Cello Dias, bass guitarist for American alternative rock band Against All Will
- Mashymre Cello, fictional character in the Gundam ZZ series
- Nadia Di Cello (born 1989), Argentine actress
- Sello, a large shopping centre in Espoo, Finland
- A former brand of high-end audio equipment by Mark Levinson (audio equipment designer)

== See also ==
- chello, an internet service provider
- Chelo (disambiguation)
- Cellophane (disambiguation)
