= Cielo =

Cielo (Spanish and Italian for "heaven" or "sky"), El Cielo (in Spanish) or Il Cielo (in Italian) may refer to:

== Arts, entertainment, and media ==
- Cielo (film), a 2017 Chile-Canadian documentary film
- Cielo (TV channel), an Italian television channel

=== Music ===
- Cielo (album), a 2003 album by Benny Ibarra
- Cielo, 1960 song by Jenny Luna
- El Cielo (album), an album by Dredg

== Companies and organizations ==
- Cielo (company), a distributor and manufacturer of frozen yogurt
- Cielo (supercomputer), at Los Alamos National Laboratory
- Cielo (water), a brand of bottled water
- Cielo S.A., a Brazilian credit card operator

== Vehicles ==
- Chery Cielo, Chinese compact car
- Daewoo Cielo, a Korean compact car

== Other uses ==
- César Cielo (born 1987), Brazilian freestyle swimmer
- Marky Cielo (1988–2008), Filipino actor and dancer
- El Cielo Biosphere Reserve, in Tamaulipas state, Mexico

== See also ==
- Scielo, the Scientific Electronic Library Online
