= HMS Jalouse =

Two ships of the Royal Navy have borne the name HMS Jalouse after the French word meaning jealous, suspicious, or wary:

- HMS Jalouse was the 18-gun Belliqueuse-class French Navy brig-corvette Jalouse launched in 1794 at Honfleur. The Royal Navy captured her in May 1797; she was broken up in 1807.
- HMS Jalouse (1809) was a Cormorant-class ship-sloop launched in 1809 and sold in 1819.
