= Chelopek =

Chelopek Челопек
- Location of Chelopek
- Coordinates: 43°8′N 23°37′E
- Country: Bulgaria
- Provinces (Oblast): Vratsa Province

Government
  - Mayor: Borislav Manchev
- Elevation: 469 m (1,539 ft)

Population (2008)
  - Total: 550
- Time zone: UTC+2 (EET)
  - Summer (DST): UTC+3 (EEST)
- Postal Code: 3093
- Area code: 09111

Chelopek (Bulgarian: Челопек) is a village in Vratsa Municipality, Vratsa Province in northwestern Bulgaria. Located in the western Balkan Mountains, it is known as the home village of Ivan Vazov's heroine Baba Iliytsa from the tale One Bulgarian Woman. Her original timbed-framed house has been reconstructed and is currently a museum of her life and local history and ethnography.

== Gallery ==
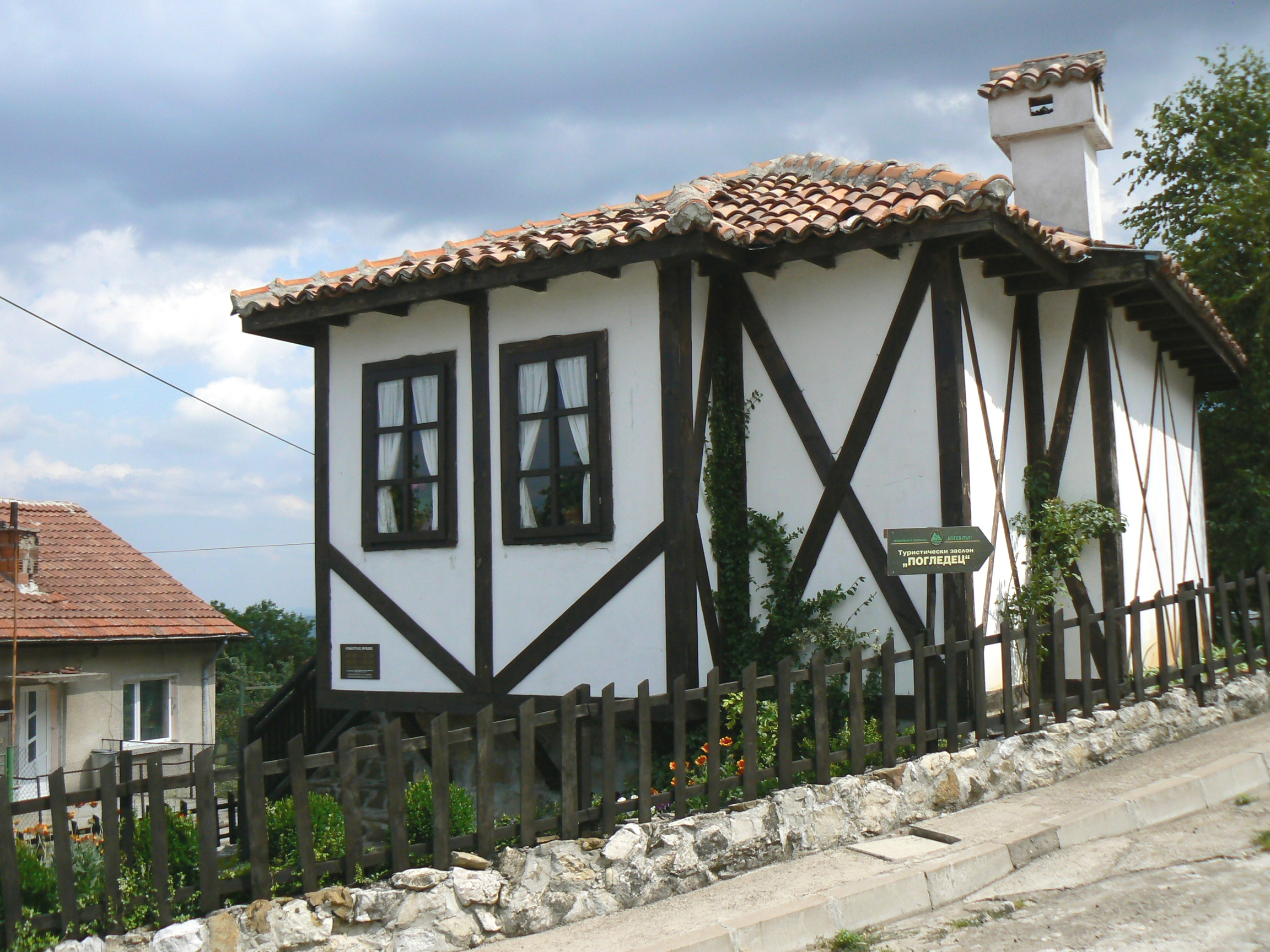
Baba Iliytsa Museum House exterior

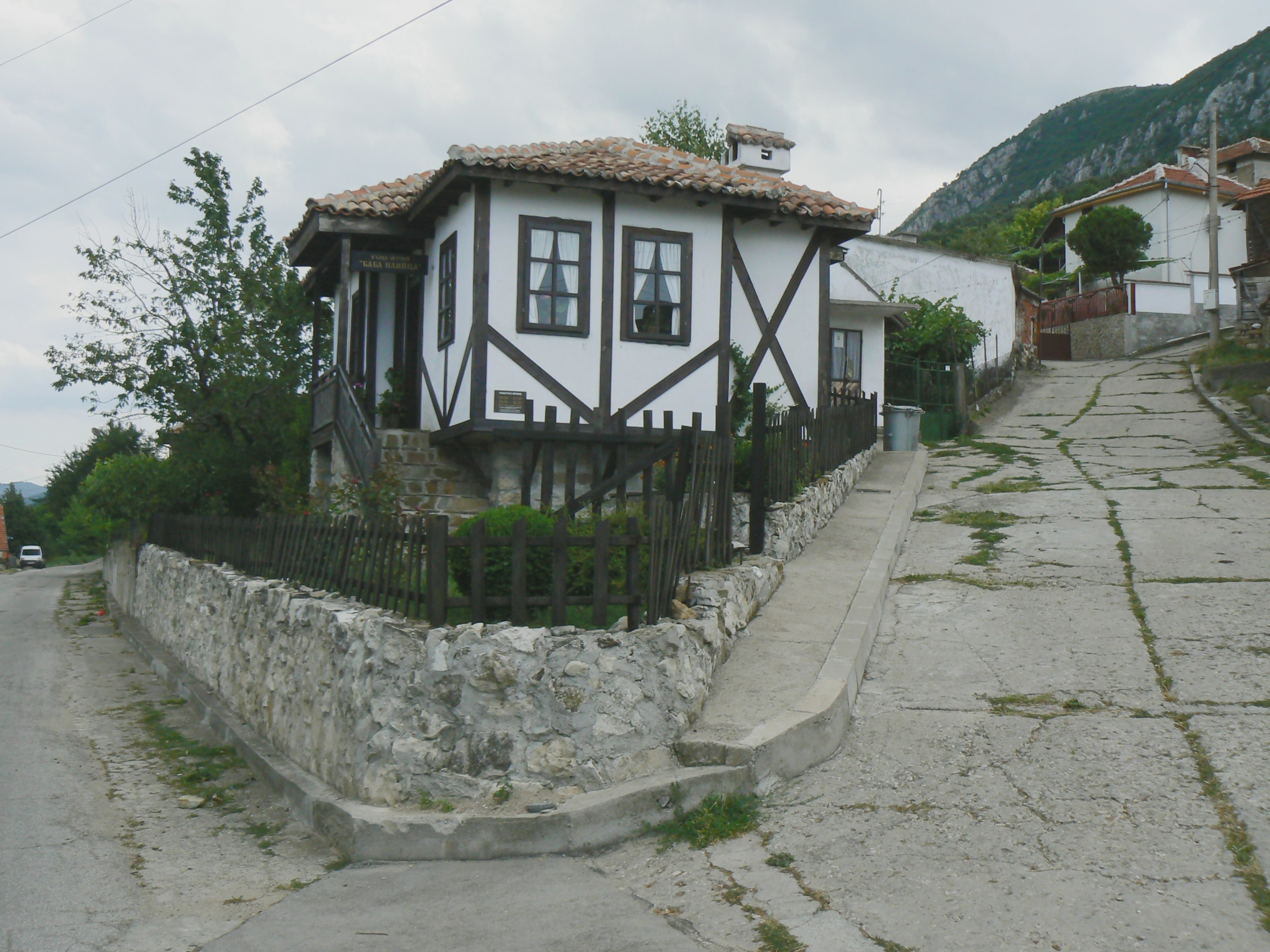
Museum house exterior

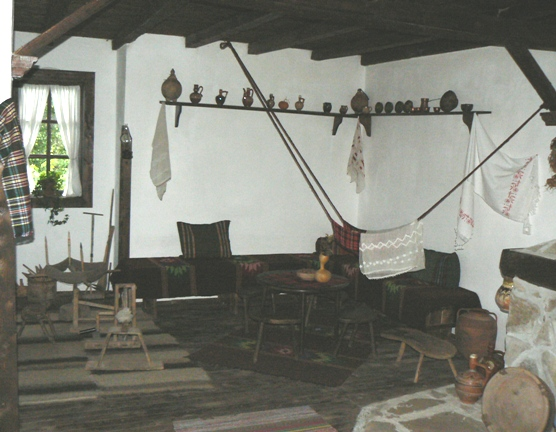
Museum house interior

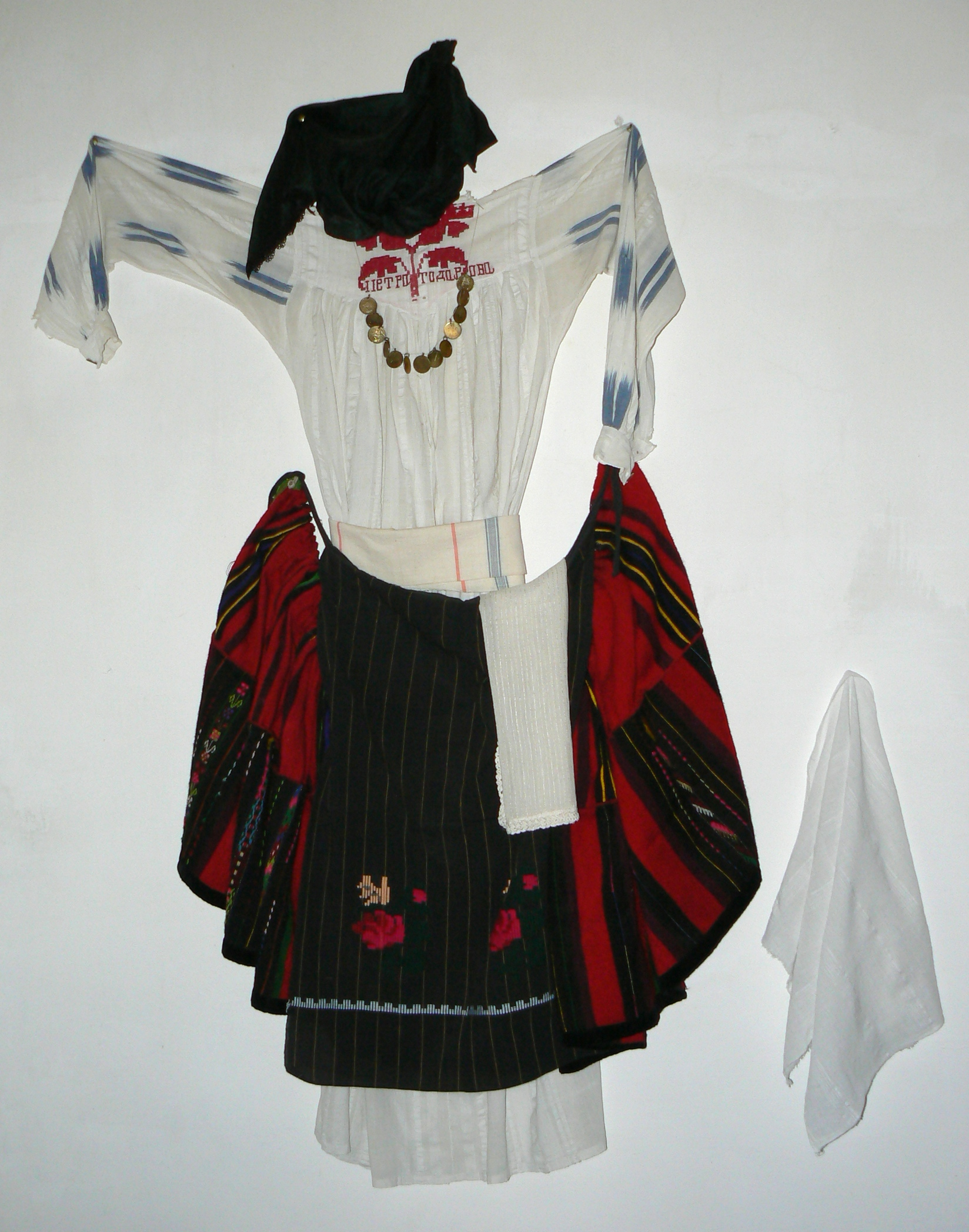
Local female costume
