= Chelo (Mexican singer) =

- Also known as: La Voz Ranchera de México; La Reina Ranchera de México
- Born: Consuelo Pérez Rubio; 18 January 1944 (age 82); Zapopan, Jalisco, Mexico
- Genre: Mariachi Ranchera Norteño Banda
- Occupations: Singer, songwriter, actress
- Labels: Sony Music Latin, Discos Musart

Consuelo "Chelo" Pérez Rubio (born 18 January 1944), is a Mexican singer, songwriter, and actress who was the former vocalist of the cumbia group Chelo y su Conjunto until she launched her solo career in the ranchera genre and began acting in movies.

== Biography ==
Otherwise known as "La Voz Ranchera de México.” Her musical inspiration is José Alfredo Jiménez she sang many of his ranchera hits. Born in the colonia of La Experiencia in the city of Zapopan, Jalisco, Chelo is the cousin of Mike Laure, another cumbia recording artist. Chelo and her daughter Yesenia Flores formed a whole era which leads them to sing throughout Mexico, Central and South America, Canada, as well as throughout the United States. They traveled around the world in great artistic caravans with figures such as Juan Gabriel, Vicente Fernandez, Lola Beltran, Lucha Villa, among others. Her most successful hit songs are "Mejor Me Voy", "Que Sacrificio", "Dos Gotas De Agua", "Al Ver Que Te Vas", "Las Cuentas Claras", "Si Ya Te Vas", "Ya Me Voy", and "Volverás Por Mi" (which reached number 1 on Billboard's Mexican Top Ten list). Chelo known as La Voz Tropical de Mexico, La Voz Ranchera, La Incomparable and simply the best female singer Mexico has had. In her career Chelo recorded 5 genres in same year which included Tropical, Norteño, Ranchero, Boleros, Cumbias and recorded with Rondalla. In addition to this great success, Chelo also acted in 13 movies in which her daughter Yesenia Flores was in five of these movies. Chelo and Yesenia venture into the cinema with films such as: Emilio Varela & Camelia la Texana, Contrabando Humano, De Puro Relajo, Operacion Mariguana, and Aborto. Throughout her musical career, Chelo recorded 62 albums with Musart Records.

In 2006, at the age of 63, she performed in Stockton, California where she sang a collection of her most famous hits at a concert with more than 30,000 fans in attendance.
