= Envy (dinghy) =

Type of sailing dinghy

Development
- Name: Envy

Boat
- Crew: 2 or 3

Hull
- Type: Monohull
- Construction: Fibreglass
- Hull weight: 83 kilograms (183 lb)
- LOA: 4.300 metres (14 ft 1.3 in)
- Beam: 1.700 metres (5 ft 6.9 in)

Sails
- Mainsail area: 8 square metres (86 sq ft)
- Jib/genoa area: 3.3 square metres (36 sq ft)
- Spinnaker area: 12 square metres (130 sq ft)

The Envy is a 4.3 m (14 ft) fibreglass sailing dinghy that is sailed in Australia. It is often used as a training boat due to its simplicity but also has the option of a symmetrical spinnaker.

The Envy is operated by the Australian Navy Cadets.
