= Marcello Pisas =

Curaçao footballer

Personal information
- Full name: Marcello Michelangel Anthony Pisas
- Date of birth: 4 September 1977 (age 49)
- Place of birth: Willemstad, Netherlands Antilles
- Height: 1.84 m (6 ft 0 in)
- Position: Goalkeeper

Team information
- Current team: CSD Barber
- Number: 1

Senior career*
Years	Team	Apps	(Gls)
2003–	CSD Barber		

International career
1996–2010	Netherlands Antilles	23	(0)
2011–	Curaçao	7	(0)
- * Club domestic league appearances and goals

Marcello "Chelo" Michelangel Anthony Pisas (born 4 September 1977) is a Curaçao professional footballer who plays as a goalkeeper for Centro Social Deportivo Barber in Netherlands Antilles First League. Pisas has appeared for the Netherlands Antilles national football team.
