= Clarence Pickett =

American religious leader (1884–1965)

Clarence Evan Pickett (1884–1965) was an American religious leader, notable 20th century Quaker, and head of a non-governmental, humanitarian relief agency.

== Background ==
Pickett was born on October 19, 1884, in Cissna Park, Illinois. He came from a family of Quakers (Religious Society of Friends) and grew up in Glen Elder, Kansas. He studied at Penn College in Iowa, the Hartford Theological Seminary and at Harvard.

== Career ==
Pickett first worked as a pastor in the Quaker communities of Toronto and Oskaloosa, and later as a national secretary of the Young Friends of Five Years Meeting now (Friends United Meeting). He was also a professor in biblical literature at Earlham College.

From 1929 to 1950 he was executive secretary of the American Friends Service Committee (AFSC), which provided relief in Europe during the World Wars as well as in the United States during the Great Depression and beyond. Clarence began his service with the AFSC while still at Earlham College becoming the Home Service Field Secretary. In 1947, while serving as Executive Secretary the organization accepted the Nobel Peace Prize in Oslo with the Friends Service Council (now Quaker Peace and Social Witness) on behalf of Quakers worldwide. The board chair Professor Henry J. Cadbury represented the American Friends Service Committee and Margaret A. Backhouse represented the Friends service Council.

Clarence served as an advisor to Presidents Hoover, Roosevelt, Truman and it is said, Kennedy. Nonetheless, in his obituary it describes that his interaction with Kennedy came during a dinner in 1962 where he first picketed against nuclear weapons outside the event and then went inside to join the dinner honoring past American Nobel Prize winners. Clarence also served on the Police Advisory Board of the Philadelphia Police Department and was its chairman from 1958 until his death. He was interviewed by the Philadelphia Inquirer on the occasion of his 80th birthday.

=== Collaboration with Eleanor Roosevelt ===
Clarence and Lilly Pickett became close with Eleanor Roosevelt over many years and are mentioned often in her newspaper column My Day. They first became acquainted in the time between election and inauguration (at that time in March) of President Franklin D. Roosevelt. They were invited to discuss the Great Depression by the President elect and his wife and more specifically the Quaker child feeding program in coal mining areas that the AFSC had been running for about two and a half years in Pennsylvania and West Virginia in response to request by President Hebert Hoover (funded in part by the Reconstruction Finance Corporation). That meeting started a longterm collaboration between Eleanor and the Picketts on work projects and a friendship that spanned many decades. Clarence was appointed the Chief of the Stranded Mining and Industrial Populations Section of the Department of the Interior by the President. Eleanor took a great interest in that work, visiting the Arthurdale community and other areas in West Virginia many times.

Eleanor Roosevelt donated most of the proceeds of her newspaper column and radio addresses to the work of the AFSC. "When I found that I could earn a certain amount of money on the radio, I realized that the American Friends Service Committee was doing work of the type which I was most interested in." said Eleanor Roosevelt in an April 1935 radio talk. She discussed the work of Friends on the radio program at times in the 1940s, including about efforts to improve Soviet/American relations in 1949.

Eleanor Roosevelt once said that she would "always try to do the things Clarence asks because I have great trust in his judgment." In 1960, Clarence asked Eleanor to serve as the host to the National Committee for Sane Nuclear Policy SANE meeting at Madison Square Garden.

=== Hiss case ===
During the 1940s, Alger Hiss, whose wife Priscilla Hiss was a Quaker, had spoken during AFSC Quaker peace institutes. On August 3, 1948, appearing under subpoena before the House Un-American Activities Committee (HUAC), Whittaker Chambers, a Quaker, included Hiss among those whom he alleged had worked in his Ware Group spy network in Washington, D.C., during the latter 1930s. On August 27, 1948, Chambers repeated the allegation about Hiss during a Meet the Press radio broadcast.

A month later, Pickett traveled to Baltimore, where he met with Chambers at a local Quaker meetinghouse. When Pickett suggested that Chambers may have mistaken Hiss' identity, Chambers said no. Undeterred, Pickett suggested that Chambers and Hiss issue some kind of public statement to avoid lawsuits. (When testifying before HUAC, Hiss had threatened to sue Chambers.) Chambers was amenable but saw no path toward that end. On December 15, 1948, a grand jury indicted Hiss on two counts of perjury relating to Chambers' allegation. In 1949, during a second trial, Pickett testified for Hiss as having "the very highest quality ... of integrity and veracity." In January 1950, Hiss was convicted on both counts of perjury and sentenced to prison.

Following publication of Chambers' memoir Witness in May 1952, Pickett wrote negatively about Chambers. Pickett stressed, despite "moments of real peace and enlightenment" experienced by Chambers as a Quaker, Chambers' sympathy for the views of Reinhold Niebuhr (in a cover story Chambers wrote for Time magazine in March 1948) shows his lack of understanding about Quakerism.

=== Active retirement ===
After becoming the emeritus executive secretary of the AFSC, he remained very involved in civic life. He and Lilly were interviewed by Edward R. Murrow in his series Person to Person in 1955. He dedicated much of his latter years to work around race relations and headed a committee that drafted the Fair Employment Practices Commission in Pennsylvania. He became co-chairman of the Committee for Sane Nuclear Policy. In 1958 he participated in various events of the Friends World Committee for Consultation, but pursued their goals then not further. Pickett served on the National Advisory Council for the Peace Corps and was a director for the United States Committee for Refugees.

== Personal life and death ==
On June 25, 1913, Pickett married Lilly Dale.

Pickett died on March 17, 1965, in Boise, Idaho.

== Awards ==
- 1953: Großes Verdienstkreuz der Bundesrepublik Deutschland

== Legacy ==
- Pickett Hall, a dormitory at Wilmington College in Ohio
- Received an Honorary Doctor of Divinity (D. D.) from Whittier College in 1950.
- Clarence E. Pickett Middle School in Philadelphia, opened in 1970.
- Clarence and Lilly Pickett Endowment for Quaker Leadership - a fund giving grants to support leadership development in the Quaker community, began its work in 1991.

== Works ==
- For More Than Bread: An Autobiographical Account of Twenty-Two Years' Work With the American Friends Service Committee (book, Little, Brown and Company, ©1953)
- Friends and international affairs (Ward lecture, Guilford College, ©1952)
- "The University of Chicago Round Table: Pattern for Peace -- An NBC Radio Discussion by Mordecai Johnson, Trygve Lie, Clarence Pickett, and Robert Redfield" (No. 645), August 6, 1950
- A comparison of the mysticism of Bernard of Clairvaux with that of the prophet Jeremiah (thesis, Hartford Theological Seminary, 1913)

== External source ==
- Clarence Pickett biography and Eleanor Roosevelt and Clarence's work together by afsc.org
- Claus Bernet: "Pickett, Clarence Evan". In: Biographisch-Bibliographisches Kirchenlexikon (BBKL). Band 32, Bautz, Nordhausen 2011, ISBN 978-3-88309-615-5, Sp. 1091–1095.
