= Cedar Crest Addition Historic District =

Historic district in Illinois, United States

- U.S. National Register of Historic Places
- U.S. Historic district
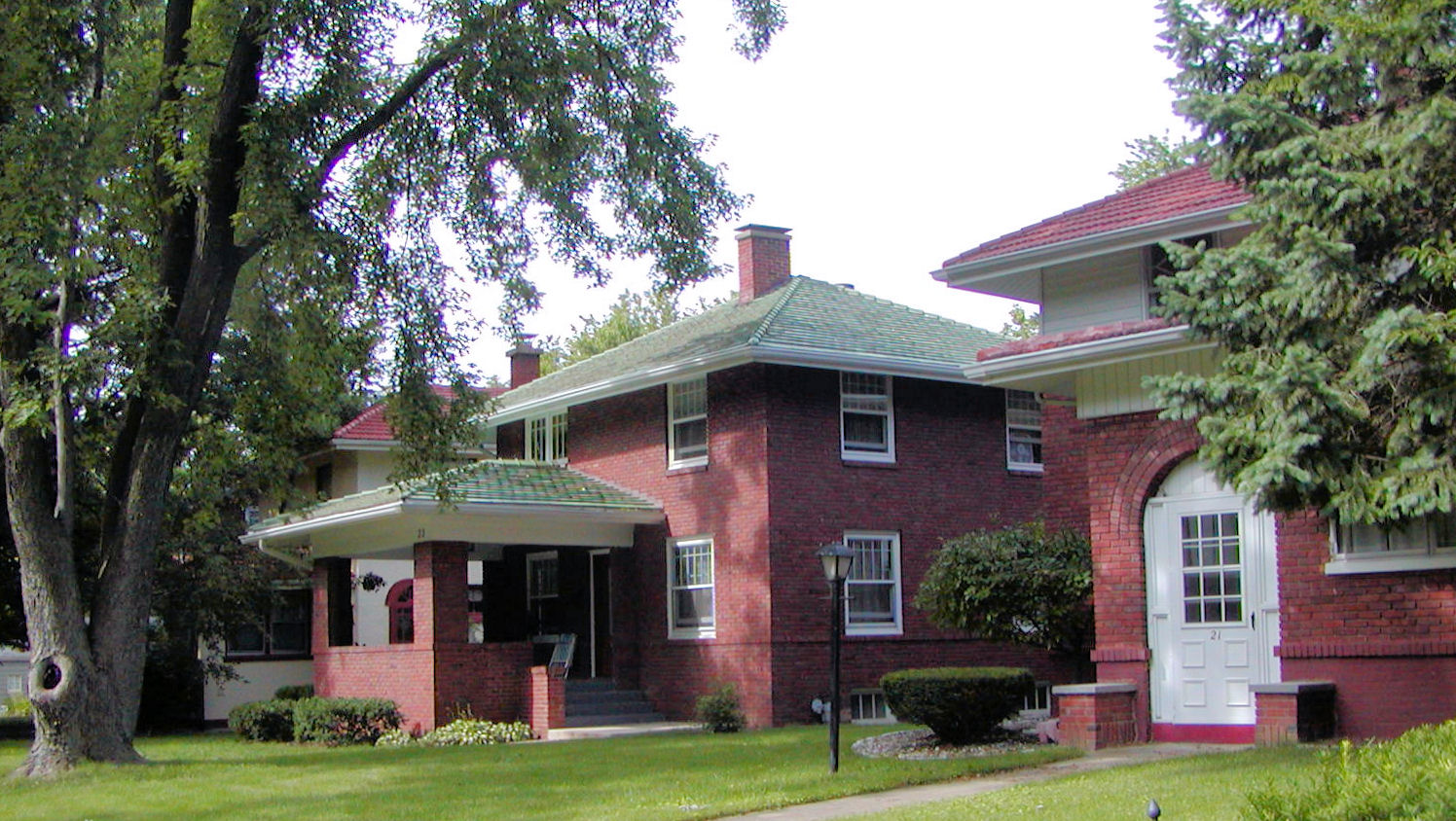
- Homes in the Cedar Crest Historic District

- Location within Illinois
- Location: Roughly bounded by Constitutional Trail, Division St., Highland Ave. and Fell Ave., Normal, Illinois
- Coordinates: 40°29′46″N 88°59′7″W
- Area: 12 acres (4.9 ha)
- Built: Various
- NRHP reference No.: 06001022
- Added to NRHP: November 15, 2006

The Cedar Crest Addition Historic District is a residential subdivision and historic district in Normal, Illinois. The subdivision is bounded roughly by Division Street to the south, Highland Avenue to the north, Fell Avenue to the west, and a local recreation trail, the Constitution Trail, to the east. Developed from 1914 to 1930, Cedar Crest Addition was the first large planned subdivision in Normal. Prior to its construction, Normal lacked paved streets and townwide electrical, sewer, and water systems and was considered more a rural area than a proper suburb of Bloomington. Planner Burt Marley Kuhn and architect Aaron T. Simmons planned the subdivision to be more developed and organized; in particular, it featured tree-lined curvilinear streets inspired by the City Beautiful movement. Simmons designed many of the houses in the district in the then-popular American Craftsman style, another modern addition to Normal. The subdivision gave Normal a much more modern reputation, and a local historian called it "one of the most important additions ever made to Normal" in the 1920s.

The district was added to the National Register of Historic Places on November 15, 2006.

Map of the Cedar Crest Historic Addition and surrounding areas using OpenStreetMap data.
