= Council Grove Carnegie Library =

- U.S. National Register of Historic Places
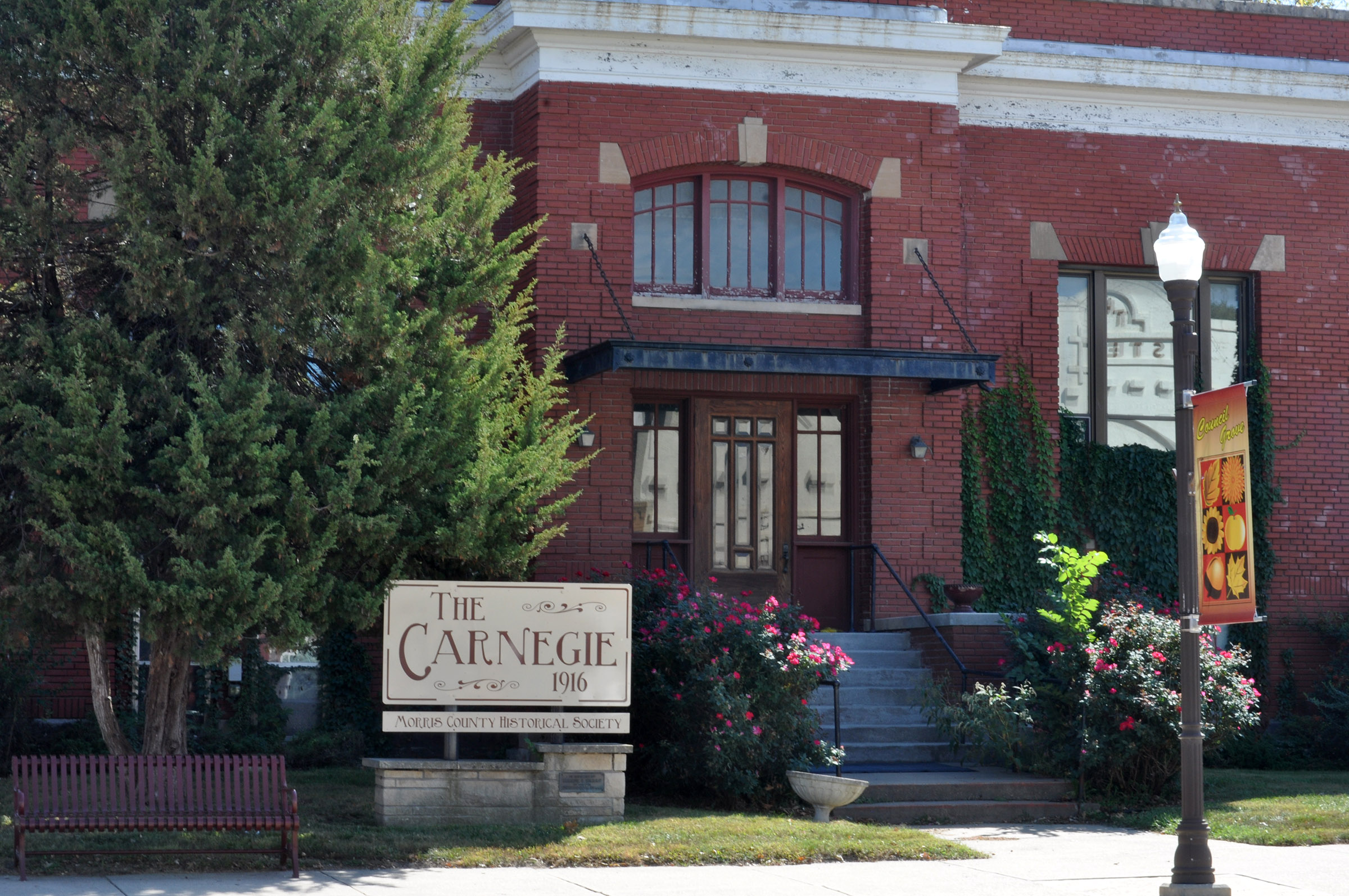

- Location within Kansas
- Location: 303 W. Main St., Council Grove, Kansas
- Coordinates: 38°39′35″N 96°29′37″W
- Area: less than one acre
- Built: 1917
- Built by: Joe Axe
- Architect: A. T. Simmons
- Architectural style: Neoclassical
- MPS: Carnegie Libraries of Kansas TR
- NRHP reference No.: 87000963
- Added to NRHP: June 25, 1987

The Council Grove Carnegie Library is a historic Carnegie library at 303 W. Main Street in Council Grove, Kansas. Council Grove's library association was formed in 1876, and they were given $10,000 by Carnegie's library program for a permanent building in 1903. The library was completed circa 1917 and opened to the public the following year. Architect A. T. Simmons of Bloomington, Illinois designed the Neoclassical library; Simmons, a prolific library architect, also designed five other Carnegie libraries in Kansas. The one-story brick library features a projecting entrance with an arched transom, limestone keystones above the door and windows, brick quoins at the corners and along the entrance bay, and a wooden entablature and brick parapet along the roof. The library operated out of the building until 2003.

The library was added to the National Register of Historic Places on June 25, 1987.
