= Hans Jørgen Undelstvedt =

- Origin: Lillesand, Norway
- Genres: Alternative rock, Indie rock, Rock, Emo, Punk rock
- Occupations: Singer; Guitarist; Songwriter
- Instruments: Guitar; Vocals
- Years active: 2005–present
- Labels: Nightliner Records/Universal; Heroes & Zeros Music
- Member of: Heroes & Zeros
- Website: www.heroesandzeros.no

Hans Jørgen Undelstvedt is the lead singer of the Norwegian rock band Heroes & Zeros. He also plays guitars and samples. In addition, he writes the lyrics for his band.

== See also ==
- Heroes & Zeros
- Lars Løberg Tofte
- Arne Kjelsrud Mathisen
