= Jealous (disambiguation) =

One who is jealous is experiencing jealousy.

Jealous may also refer to:

== Music ==
=== Albums ===
- Jealous (album), by John Lee Hooker, 1986

=== Songs ===
- "Jealous" (Beyoncé song), 2013
- "Jealous" (Eyedress song), 2019
- "Jealous" (Labrinth song), 2014
- "Jealous" (Nick Jonas song), 2014
- "Jealous" (Nina Girado song), 2002
- "Jealous" (Sinéad O'Connor song), 2000
- "Jealous" (TVXQ song), 2018
- "Jealous (I Ain't with It)", by Chromeo, 2014
- "Jealous", by AlunaGeorge from I Remember, 2016
- "Jealous", by Dir En Grey, 1998
- "Jealous", by DJ Khaled from Father of Asahd, 2019
- "Jealous", by Fredo Santana from Trappin Ain't Dead, 2013
- "Jealous", by Future and Metro Boomin from We Still Don't Trust You, 2024
- "Jealous", by Gene Loves Jezebel, 1990
- "Jealous", by Ingrid Michaelson from Stranger Songs, 2019
- "Jealous", by Jack Little
- "Jealous", by Jessica Mauboy from Hilda, 2019
- "Jealous", by Lennon Stella from Three. Two. One., 2020
- "Jealous", by Mahalia featuring Rico Nasty, 2021
- "Jealous", by Ne-Yo from R.E.D., 2012
- "Jealous", by Rod Stewart from Tonight I'm Yours, 1981

== Other uses ==
- Ben Jealous (born 1973), American civic leader and politician

== See also ==
- Jealousy (disambiguation)
- I'm Jealous (disambiguation)
