= Chase County Courthouse (Nebraska) =

- U.S. National Register of Historic Places
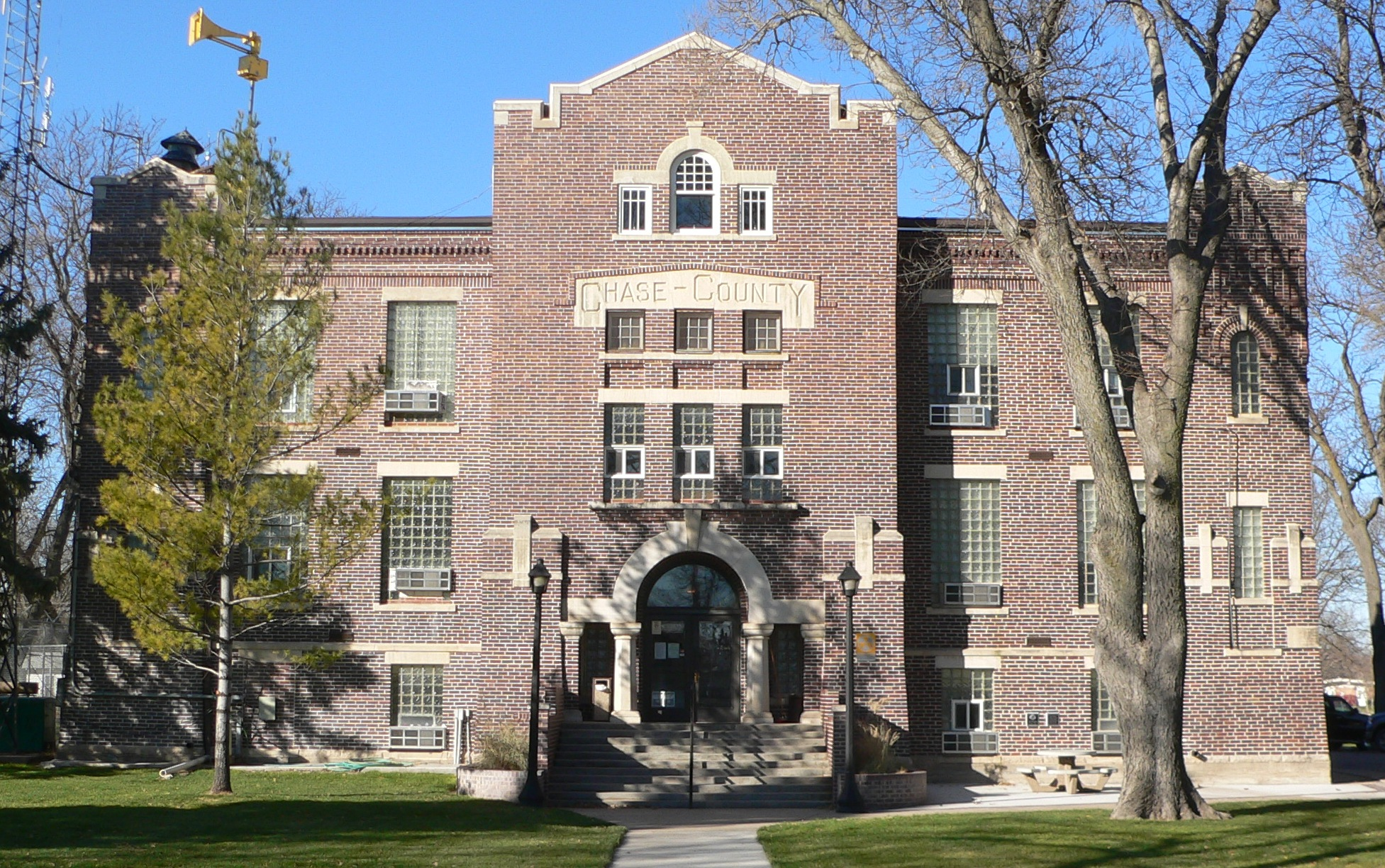

- Location within Nebraska Location within the United States
- Location: Broadway between 9th and 10th Sts., Imperial, Nebraska
- Coordinates: 40°31′14″N 101°38′36″W
- Area: 1.5 acres (0.61 ha)
- Built: 1910
- Architect: Simmons, A. T.
- Architectural style: Tudor Revival, Jacobethan
- MPS: County Courthouses of Nebraska MPS
- NRHP reference No.: 89002222
- Added to NRHP: January 10, 1990

The Chase County Courthouse, located on Broadway between 9th and 10th Sts., Imperial, Nebraska, was built during 1910–1912 of dark brick and limestone trim, with Jacobethan features unique in Nebraska courthouses.

It was designed by architect A. T. Simmons of Bloomington, Illinois, who later designed the Dundy County Courthouse in adjacent Dundy County, Nebraska.

It was listed on the National Register of Historic Places in 1990.
