= Cielo (company) =

Dairy products company

Cielo Yogurt Corporation
- Type: Manufacturer/Distributor
- Industry: Frozen yogurt powder
- Founded: 1979, Italy
- Headquarters: Multiple locations
- Key people: (founder/ceo) B. 1942
- Products: Food/Manufacturer
- Revenue: 126 mil (2006) Est.
- Number of employees: 1,300
- Website: cielousa.com

Cielo is the largest distributor/manufacturer of frozen yogurt ingredients in Europe.

== About ==
Founded in 1979 in Italy and credited with launching the frozen yogurt craze in 2004, Cielo's International dist. division was launched in 1997 with branches in Singapore, Guadalajara, Mexico, Beijing, China, and Chino, Ca, United States.
