= Celos =

Celos may refer to:

- Celos, a Spanish term for jealousy
- "Celos" (song), a 1983 song by Daniela Romo; covered by Fanny Lu (2009)
- "Celos", a song by Marc Anthony from Libre (2001)
- Celos (film), a 1946 Argentine drama film directed by Mario Soffici
- Jealousy (1999 film) or Celos, a 1999 Spanish drama film directed by Vicente Aranda

== See also ==
- Jealousy (disambiguation)
