= Alain Celo =

French composer and violist

Alain Celo (born 1960) is a French composer and violist with the Orchestre national de Lorraine.

He has written about twenty works, mainly instrumental. He followed a complete cursus of music writing and musical composition at the Conservatoire de Metz, with François Narboni. He was awarded the SACEM Prize, and also received advice from Claude Lefebvre and George Crumb. His influences range from Debussy and Stravinsky to Ligeti, through jazz and ethnic music. His pieces most often feature the relationship between man and nature (from Oiseaux imaginaires pour piano in 1993 to Espaces désertiques for flute, violin, double bass and percussion in 2003) or are directly related to literary works (Commentaires sur Verlaine for viola, piano and narrator, 1996, Erlkönig after Goethe for voices and strings, 2001). Commissioned by the Pyxis Ensemble, his work, L’Amour et le Sablier (soprano voices, flute, viola and piano), on poems by Louis Chadourne, was premiered in 2004 (printed since at Éditions musicales européennes).

His works have been performed by the Stravinsky ensemble, the Cergy-Pontoise Studio, Symblêma, Souffle d’ébène.
