= Vestre Moland Municipality =

Former municipality in Aust-Agder, Norway

Vestre Moland Municipality Vestre Moland herred
- Former municipality
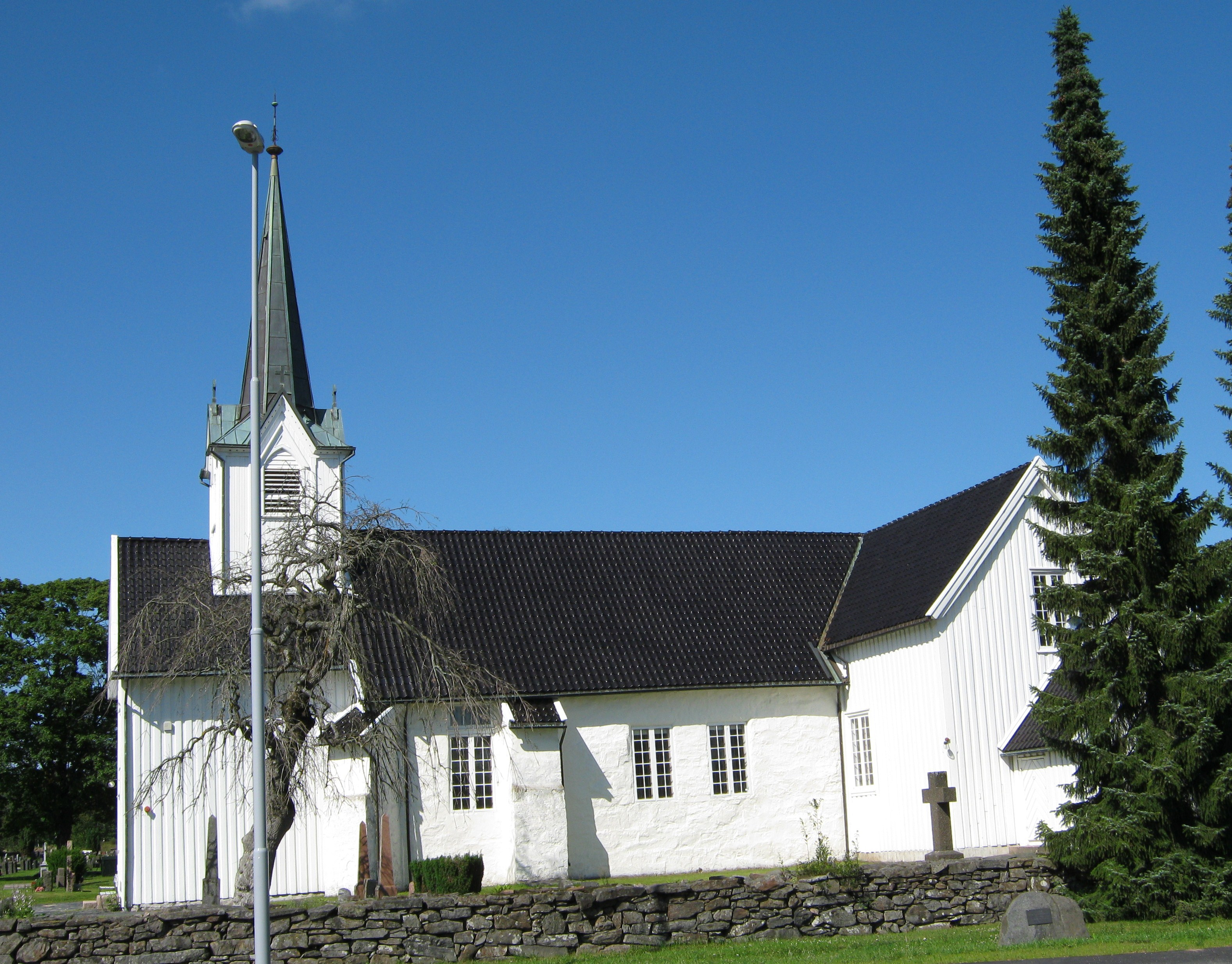
- View of the Vestre Moland Church which was built of stone in the 12th century

- Aust-Agder within Norway

- Vestre Moland within Aust-Agder
- Coordinates: 58°15′31″N 08°21′54″E
- Country: Norway
- County: Aust-Agder
- Established: 1 Jan 1838
  - Created as: Formannskapsdistrikt
- Disestablished: 1 Jan 1962
  - Succeeded by: Lillesand Municipality
- Administrative centre: Møglestu

Government
  - Mayor (1960–1961): Birger Gauslaa (V)

Area
  - Total: 103.1 km^{2} (39.8 sq mi)
  - Rank: #532 in Norway
- Highest elevation: 234.83 m (770.4 ft)

Population (1961)
  - Total: 2,386
  - Rank: #393 in Norway
  - Density: 23.1/km^{2} (60/sq mi)
  - Change (10 years): ▲ +10.6%
- Demonym: Molending

Official language
  - Norwegian form: Neutral
- Time zone: UTC+01:00 (CET)
  - Summer (DST): UTC+02:00 (CEST)
- ISO 3166 code: NO-0926

Vestre Moland is a former municipality in the old Aust-Agder county, Norway. The 103.1-square-kilometre (39.8 sq mi) municipality existed from 1838 until its dissolution in 1962. The area is now part of Lillesand Municipality in the traditional district of Sørlandet in Agder county. The administrative centre was the village of Møglestu where the Vestre Moland Church. Today, the area of the old Vestre Moland Municipality covers the northern part of Lillesand Municipality.

Prior to its dissolution in 1962, the 103.1-square-kilometre (39.8 sq mi) municipality was the 532nd largest by area out of the 731 municipalities in Norway. Vestre Moland Municipality was the 393rd most populous municipality in Norway with a population of about 2,386. The municipality's population density was 23.1 inhabitants per square kilometre (60/sq mi) and its population had increased by 10.6% over the previous 10-year period.

== General information ==
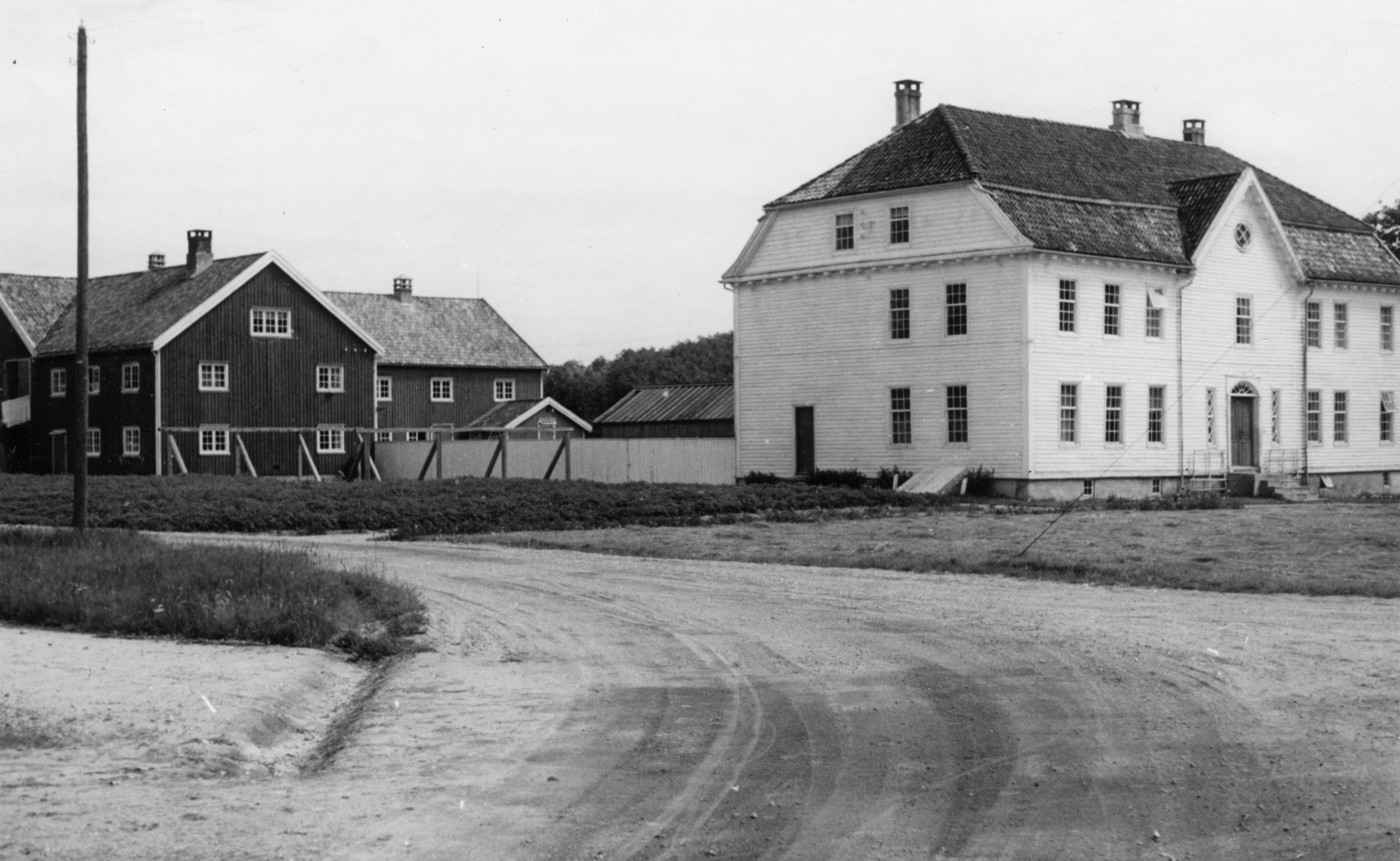
Historical picture from Møglestue

The parish of Vestre Moland was established as a municipality on 1 January 1838 (see formannskapsdistrikt law). In 1865, Vestre Moland Municipality was divided as follows: the southwestern district (population: 2,069) became the new Høvaag Municipality and the northeastern district (population: 2,167) continued as a smaller Vestre Moland Municipality.

During the 1960s, there were many municipal mergers across Norway due to the work of the Schei Committee. On 1 January 1964, Vestre Moland Municipality was dissolved and the following areas were merged to form an enlarged Lillesand Municipality:

- all of Vestre Moland Municipality (population: 2,454)
- all of Høvåg Municipality (population: 1,330)
- the town of Lillesand (population: 1,041)
- the Gitmark farm area from Eide Municipality (population: 22)

=== Name ===
The municipality (originally the parish) is named after the old Moland farm (Old Norse: Móðguland), since the first Vestre Moland Church was built there. The prefix vestre (which means "western") was added to differentiate the place from Austre Moland Municipality which was located a little further north along the coast of Norway in the present-day Arendal Municipality. The first element of the name is derived from the river Móðga. The river name comes from the Old Norse word móðigr which means "brave" or "courageous". The last element is land which means "land" or "district".

=== Churches ===
The Church of Norway had one parish (sokn) within Vestre Moland Municipality. At the time of the municipal dissolution, it was part of the Vestre Moland prestegjeld and the Vest-Nedenes prosti (deanery) in the Diocese of Agder.

Churches in Vestre Moland Municipality
Parish (sokn)	Church name	Location of the church	Year built
Vestre Moland	Vestre Moland Church	Møglestu	c. 1150
Vestre Moland	Justøy Chapel	Brekkestø	1884

== Geography ==
Vestre Moland Municipality included the island of Justøya and the mainland area surrounding the ladested of Lillesand. It also included the lake Austre Grimevannet found in the north and the Blindleia inland waterway which is located along the coast. The highest point in the municipality was the 234.83-metre (770.4 ft) tall mountain Hisåsen in the northern part of the municipality.

== Government ==
While it existed, Vestre Moland Municipality was responsible for primary education (through 10th grade), outpatient health services, senior citizen services, welfare and other social services, zoning, economic development, and municipal roads and utilities. The municipality was governed by a municipal council of directly elected representatives. The mayor was indirectly elected by a vote of the municipal council. The municipality was under the jurisdiction of the Sand District Court and the Agder Court of Appeal.

=== Municipal council ===
The municipal council (Herredsstyre) of Vestre Moland Municipality was made up of 21 representatives that were elected to four year terms. The tables below show the historical composition of the council by political party.

Vestre Moland herredsstyre 1959–1961
Party name (in Norwegian)	Number of representatives
Labour Party (Arbeiderpartiet)	7
Conservative Party (Høyre)	3
Christian Democratic Party (Kristelig Folkeparti)	2
Centre Party (Senterpartiet)	3
Liberal Party (Venstre)	6
Total number of members:	21
Note: On 1 January 1962, Vestre Moland Municipality became part of Lillesand Municipality.

Vestre Moland herredsstyre 1955–1959
Party name (in Norwegian)	Number of representatives
Labour Party (Arbeiderpartiet)	7
Conservative Party (Høyre)	3
Christian Democratic Party (Kristelig Folkeparti)	3
Farmers' Party (Bondepartiet)	3
Liberal Party (Venstre)	5
Total number of members:	21

Vestre Moland herredsstyre 1951–1955
Party name (in Norwegian)	Number of representatives
Labour Party (Arbeiderpartiet)	8
Conservative Party (Høyre)	2
Christian Democratic Party (Kristelig Folkeparti)	2
Farmers' Party (Bondepartiet)	3
Liberal Party (Venstre)	5
Total number of members:	20

Vestre Moland herredsstyre 1947–1951
Party name (in Norwegian)	Number of representatives
Labour Party (Arbeiderpartiet)	6
Conservative Party (Høyre)	3
Christian Democratic Party (Kristelig Folkeparti)	3
Farmers' Party (Bondepartiet)	2
Joint list of the Liberal Party (Venstre) and the Radical People's Party (Radikale Folkepartiet)	6
Total number of members:	20

Vestre Moland herredsstyre 1945–1947
Party name (in Norwegian)	Number of representatives
Labour Party (Arbeiderpartiet)	7
Conservative Party (Høyre)	2
Christian Democratic Party (Kristelig Folkeparti)	3
Farmers' Party (Bondepartiet)	2
Joint list of the Liberal Party (Venstre) and the Radical People's Party (Radikale Folkepartiet)	6
Total number of members:	20

Vestre Moland herredsstyre 1937–1941*
Party name (in Norwegian)	Number of representatives
Labour Party (Arbeiderpartiet)	5
Conservative Party (Høyre)	4
Farmers' Party (Bondepartiet)	3
Liberal Party (Venstre)	8
Total number of members:	20
Note: Due to the German occupation of Norway during World War II, no elections were held for new municipal councils until after the war ended in 1945.

=== Mayors ===
The mayor (Norwegian: ordfører) of Vestre Moland Municipality was the political leader of the municipality and the chairperson of the municipal council. The following people have held this position:

- 1838–1839: Rev. Jacob Fridrichsen
- 1840–1841: Daniel Isefjær
- 1842–1843: Hans Christensen Kjøstvedt
- 1844–1845: Henrik Heldal
- 1846–1847: Jacob E. Glamsland
- 1848–1851: John T. Flørenes
- 1852–1855: Andreas Nicolai Gregersen
- 1856–1857: Arnt Tobias Abrahamsen Fleseid
- 1858–1861: Jacob Nielsen Stendahl
- 1862–1867: Jens Nilsen Flørenes
- 1868–1869: Osmund H. Glamsland
- 1870–1871: Osmund Sangereid
- 1872–1873: Osmund H. Glamsland
- 1874–1875: Osmund Sangereid
- 1876–1885: Johannes Andreas Henschien (MV)
- 1886–1887: Erik Grønneberg
- 1888–1899: Syvert Songe (V)
- 1900–1913: Tønnes Andreas Birknes (V)
- 1914–1916: Johan Skalle (H)
- 1917–1922: Henrik Gauslaa (Bp)
- 1923–1925: Johannes Wiborg (H)
- 1926–1926: Nils Rosenberg (V)
- 1926–1937: Daniel Svendsen (V)
- 1938–1940: Emil Holte (V)
- 1941–1943: Anders Nyberg (NS)
- 1943–1945: Nils Unander (NS)
- 1945–1947: Emil Holte (V)
- 1948–1955: Birger Gauslaa (V)
- 1956–1959: Fridtjof Lundemoen (V)
- 1960–1961: Birger Gauslaa (V)

== See also ==
- List of former municipalities of Norway
