= Høvåg Municipality =

Former municipality in Aust-Agder, Norway

Høvåg Municipality Høvåg herred
- Former municipality
- Høvaag herred (historic name)
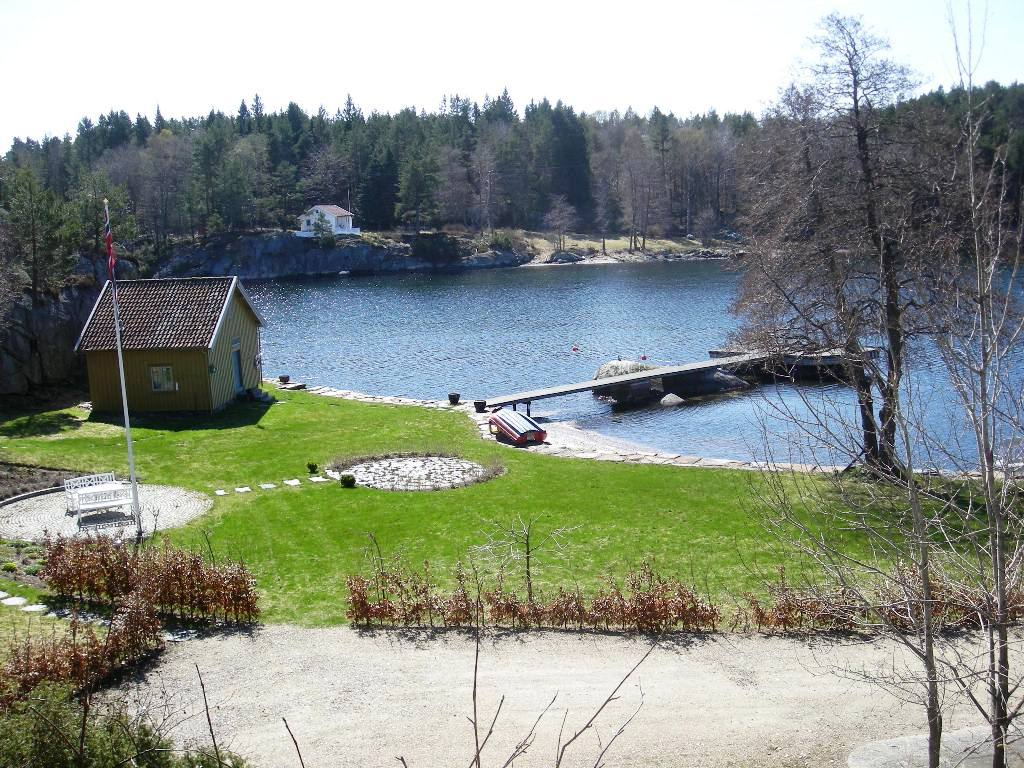
- View of coastal Høvåg

- Aust-Agder within Norway

- Høvåg within Aust-Agder
- Coordinates: 58°10′11″N 08°14′50″E
- Country: Norway
- County: Aust-Agder
- Established: 1 Jan 1865
  - Preceded by: Vestre Moland Municipality
- Disestablished: 1 Jan 1962
  - Succeeded by: Lillesand Municipality
- Administrative centre: Høvåg

Government
  - Mayor (1960–1961): Sigurd Kleveland (V)

Area
  - Total: 76.8 km^{2} (29.7 sq mi)
  - Rank: #572 in Norway
- Highest elevation: 199 m (653 ft)

Population (1961)
  - Total: 1,345
  - Rank: #582 in Norway
  - Density: 17.5/km^{2} (45/sq mi)
  - Change (10 years): ▼ −7%
- Demonym: Høvding

Official language
  - Norwegian form: Bokmål
- Time zone: UTC+01:00 (CET)
  - Summer (DST): UTC+02:00 (CEST)
- ISO 3166 code: NO-0927

Høvåg is a former municipality in the old Aust-Agder county, Norway. The 76.8-square-kilometre (29.7 sq mi) municipality existed from 1865 until its dissolution in 1962. The area is now part of Lillesand Municipality in the traditional district of Sørlandet in Agder county. The administrative centre was the village of Høvåg where the Høvåg Church is located. Other villages and coastal settlements in Høvåg included Ulvøysund, Gamle Hellesund, Skotteviga, Kjøbmannsvig and Ågerøyhavn. The village of Høvåg is located midway between the towns of Lillesand and Kristiansand.

Prior to its dissolution in 1962, the 76.8-square-kilometre (29.7 sq mi) municipality was the 572nd largest by area out of the 731 municipalities in Norway. Høvåg Municipality was the 582nd most populous municipality in Norway with a population of about 1,345. The municipality's population density was 17.5 inhabitants per square kilometre (45/sq mi) and its population had decreased by 7% over the previous 10-year period.

== General information ==
The municipality of Høvaag (later spelled Høvåg) was established in 1865 when Vestre Moland Municipality was divided into two: the southwestern district (population: 2,069) became the new Høvaag Municipality and the northeastern district (population: 2,167) continued as a smaller Vestre Moland Municipality.

During the 1960s, there were many municipal mergers across Norway due to the work of the Schei Committee. On 1 January 1964, Høvåg Municipality was dissolved and the following areas were merged to form an enlarged Lillesand Municipality:

- all of Høvåg Municipality (population: 1,330)
- all of Vestre Moland Municipality (population: 2,454)
- the town of Lillesand (population: 1,041)
- the Gitmark farm area from Eide Municipality (population: 22)

=== Name ===
The municipality (originally the parish) is named after the old Høvaag farm (Old Norse: Høyvágar). The first element is høy which means "hay". The last element is the plural form of vágr which means "bay" or "inlet". This is likely because the land along the bay is the site of lush vegetation.

On 21 December 1917, a royal resolution enacted the 1917 Norwegian language reforms. Prior to this change, the name was spelled Høvaag with the digraph "aa", and after this reform, the name was spelled Høvåg, using the letter å instead.

=== Churches ===
The Church of Norway had one parish (sokn) within Høvåg Municipality. At the time of the municipal dissolution, it was part of the Høvåg prestegjeld and the Vest-Nedenes prosti (deanery) in the Diocese of Agder.

Churches in Høvåg Municipality
Parish (sokn)	Church name	Location of the church	Year built
Høvåg	Høvåg Church	Høvåg	c. 1100

== Geography ==
The municipality was the southernmost municipality in Aust-Agder county. The Blindleia inland strait flowed through the municipality. The highest point in the municipality was the 199-metre (653 ft) tall mountain Steinåsheia.

== Government ==
While it existed, Høvåg Municipality was responsible for primary education (through 10th grade), outpatient health services, senior citizen services, welfare and other social services, zoning, economic development, and municipal roads and utilities. The municipality was governed by a municipal council of directly elected representatives. The mayor was indirectly elected by a vote of the municipal council. The municipality was under the jurisdiction of the Sand District Court and the Agder Court of Appeal.

=== Municipal council ===
The municipal council (Herredsstyre) of Høvåg Municipality was made up of 17 representatives that were elected to four year terms. The tables below show the historical composition of the council by political party.

Høvåg herredsstyre 1959–1961
Party name (in Norwegian)	Number of representatives
Labour Party (Arbeiderpartiet)	2
Conservative Party (Høyre)	3
Christian Democratic Party (Kristelig Folkeparti)	2
Centre Party (Senterpartiet)	3
Liberal Party (Venstre)	7
Total number of members:	17
Note: On 1 January 1962, Høvåg Municipality became part of Lillesand Municipality.

Høvåg herredsstyre 1955–1959
Party name (in Norwegian)	Number of representatives
Conservative Party (Høyre)	3
Christian Democratic Party (Kristelig Folkeparti)	3
Farmers' Party (Bondepartiet)	3
Liberal Party (Venstre)	8
Total number of members:	17

Høvåg herredsstyre 1951–1955
Party name (in Norwegian)	Number of representatives
Labour Party (Arbeiderpartiet)	2
Christian Democratic Party (Kristelig Folkeparti)	3
Liberal Party (Venstre)	6
Joint List(s) of Non-Socialist Parties (Borgerlige Felleslister)	5
Total number of members:	16

Høvåg herredsstyre 1947–1951
Party name (in Norwegian)	Number of representatives
Labour Party (Arbeiderpartiet)	1
Christian Democratic Party (Kristelig Folkeparti)	3
Liberal Party (Venstre)	6
Joint List(s) of Non-Socialist Parties (Borgerlige Felleslister)	6
Total number of members:	16

Høvåg herredsstyre 1945–1947
Party name (in Norwegian)	Number of representatives
Labour Party (Arbeiderpartiet)	2
Joint list of the Liberal Party (Venstre) and the Radical People's Party (Radikale Folkepartiet)	7
Joint List(s) of Non-Socialist Parties (Borgerlige Felleslister)	6
Local List(s) (Lokale lister)	1
Total number of members:	16

Høvåg herredsstyre 1937–1941*
Party name (in Norwegian)	Number of representatives
Labour Party (Arbeiderpartiet)	2
Conservative Party (Høyre)	3
Liberal Party (Venstre)	5
Local List(s) (Lokale lister)	6
Total number of members:	16
Note: Due to the German occupation of Norway during World War II, no elections were held for new municipal councils until after the war ended in 1945.

=== Mayors ===
The mayor (Norwegian: ordfører) of Høvåg Municipality was the political leader of the municipality and the chairperson of the municipal council. The following people have held this position:

- 1864–1865: Carl O. Gregersen
- 1866–1868: Rev. Peder Allarich Christensen
- 1868–1869: Abraham Olsen Kjøstvedt
- 1870–1871: Nils Andreas Andersen Stendal
- 1872–1873: Nils Jakobsen
- 1874–1885: Nils Andreas Andersen Stendal (V)
- 1886–1889: Ole Tobias Johannesen Vallesvær (MV)
- 1890–1895: Ole Andersen Aagerøy (V)
- 1896–1898: Ole Tobias Vallesvær (MV)
- 1899–1904: Karl Kvaase (V)
- 1905–1913: Svend A. Kjøstvedt (H)
- 1914–1919: Karl Kvaase (V)
- 1920–1925: Thor Andersen Aagerøy (V)
- 1926–1928: Anders Abrahamsen (H)
- 1929–1931: Thor Andersen Aagerøy (V)
- 1932–1942: Jonas Jonassen
- 1942–1945: Henry J. Erichsen (NS)
- 1945–1945: Jonas Jonassen
- 1945–1955: Thorvald Kjøstvedt (V)
- 1956–1959: Abraham Kjøstvedt (Bp)
- 1960–1961: Sigurd Kleveland (V)

== Attractions ==
=== Høvåg Church ===
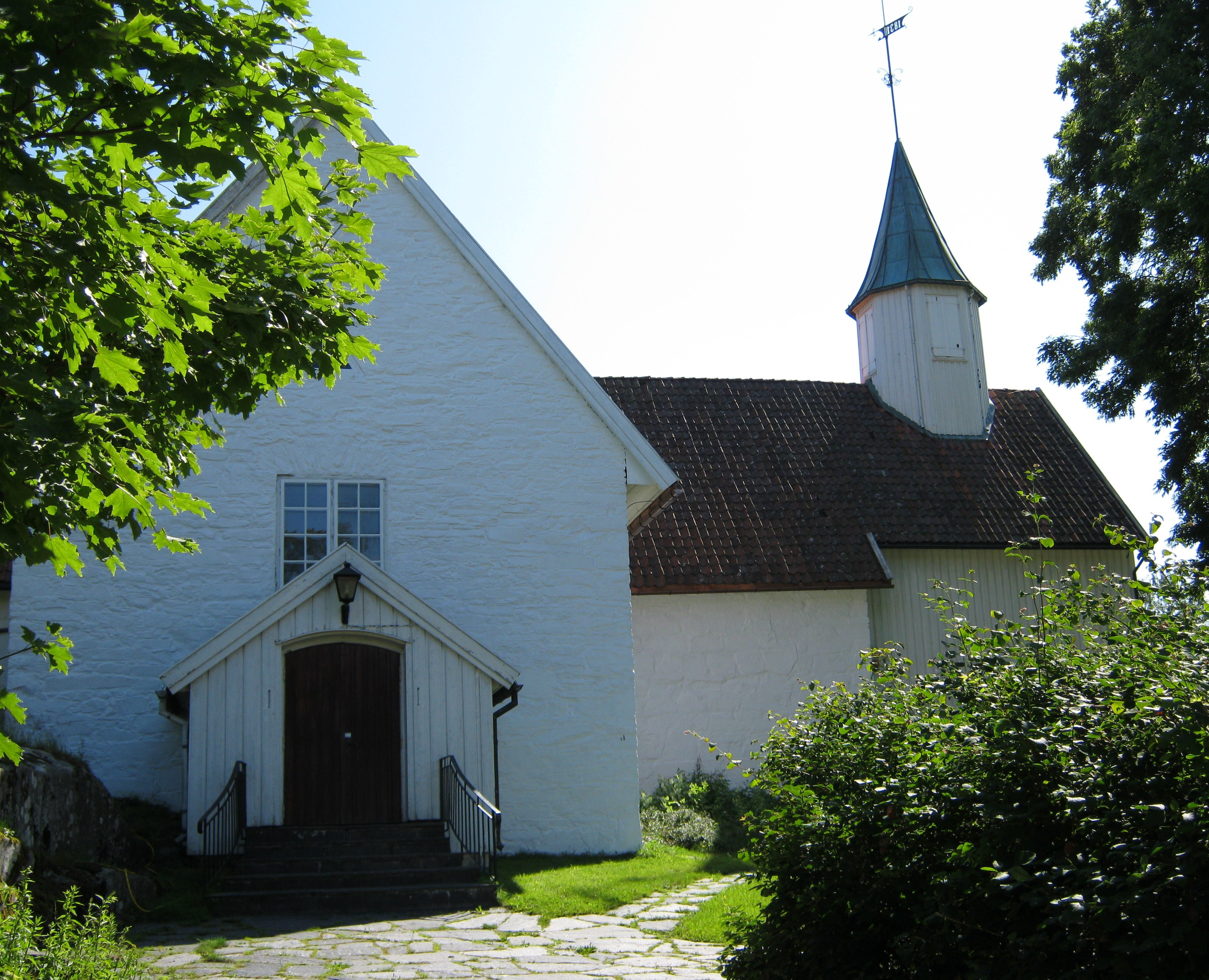
Høvåg Church

Høvåg Church (Norwegian: Høvåg kirke) is located in the Høvåg parish in Vest-Nedenes prosti. It is constructed of brick and was built circa 1100-1150. The church uses a cruciform floor plan and has 400 seats. The nave is shaped like a T with the altar in the center. In 1723, the congregation started a project to expand, maintain, and refurbish the church. The west wing was joined in 1768, the north wing, which is the current main entrance was built in 1828. The tower was built in 1831. The altarpiece is a triptych representing faith, hope, and love. It is from about 1620 and was completed by an unknown artist. The pulpit is from about 1660. Around 1900 the altarpiece was painted white, but in 1935 it was restored to the present form. The pictures on the pulpit is of the four evangelists.

== Notable people ==
- Karl Johan Fjermeros, a local politician

== See also ==
- List of former municipalities of Norway
