= Gamle Hellesund =

Village in Lillesand Municipality, Norway

- Outport (Village)
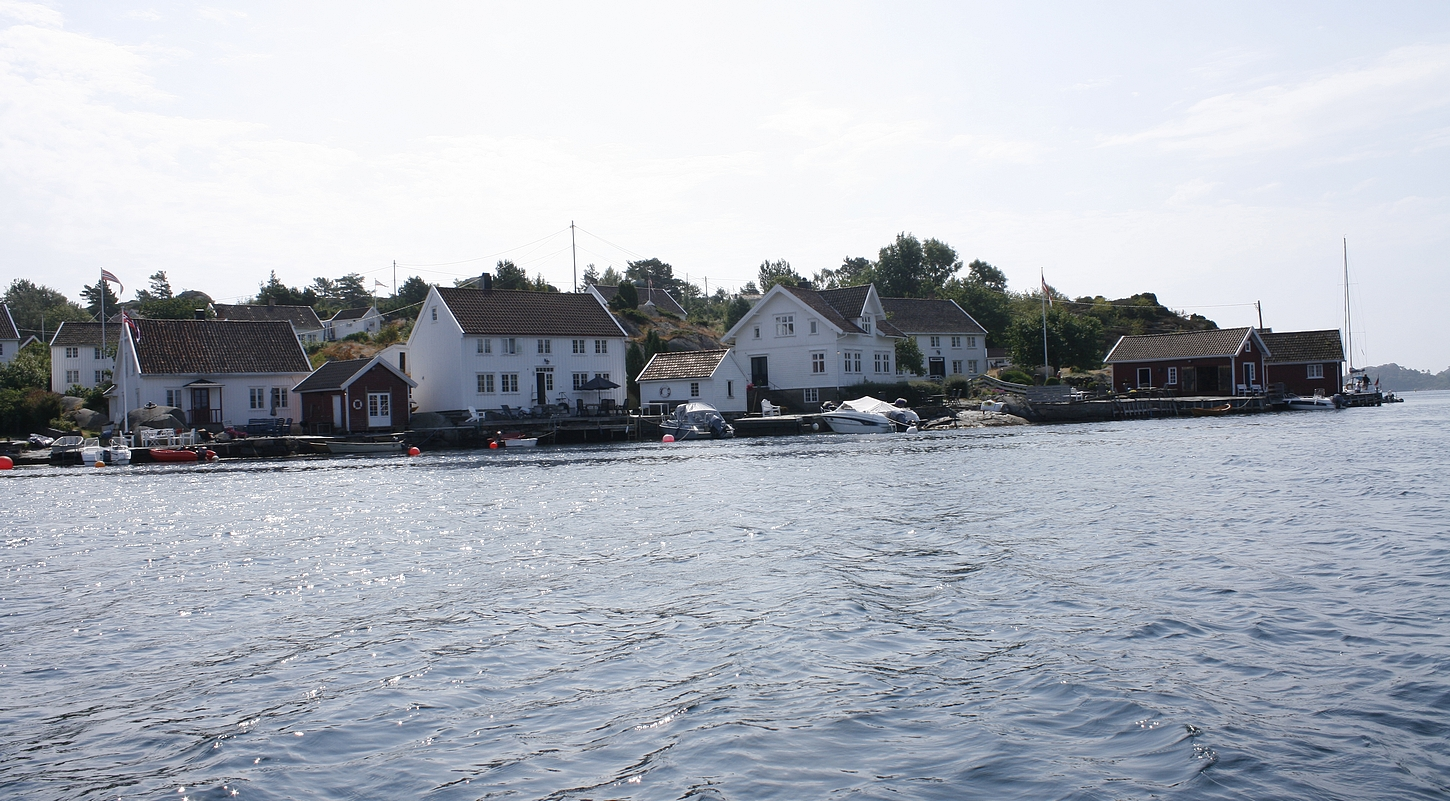
- View of the village
- Interactive map of Gamle Hellesund
- Coordinates: 58.1467°N 08.2552°E
- Country: Norway
- Region: Southern Norway
- County: Agder
- Municipality: Lillesand Municipality
- Elevation: 1 m (3.3 ft)
- Time zone: UTC+01:00 (CET)
  - Summer (DST): UTC+02:00 (CEST)
- Post Code: 4770 Høvåg

Gamle Hellesund is an outport in the Høvåg area of Lillesand Municipality in Agder county, Norway. It is located on the island of Helløya in the coastal archipelago about halfway between the village of Ulvøysund to the southwest and Ågerøyhavn to the northeast. The small village is only accessible by boat. Historically, the village served as an outport along the Blindleia strait for boats coming from the Skagerrak. Today, Gamle Hellesund stays empty most of the year and is largely used in the summer by tourists.

== History ==
Both Sverris saga and the Bagler sagas mention the port of Helgasund respectively in 1197 and 1207, but it is not known whether they are referring to Gamle Hellesund or the outport of Ny-Hellesund in Søgne Municipality (now part of Kristiansand Municipality). Dutch books for maritime pilots and nautical charts from the 16th century both mention Olde Hil Sont and Gammel Hil Sont, indicating that the outport was known for foreign sailors already then.

Gamle Hellesund had its point of highest activity in the 19th century during the so-called era of sailing ships. There was a lot of maritime traffic along the coast, and ships from many countries visited the outports. Southern Norway then had a very active period, with diverse shipyards and shipping companies. Because of all the activity, Gamle Hellesund had a pilot station and a customs station.
