= Brekkestø =

Village in Lillesand Municipality, Norway

- Village
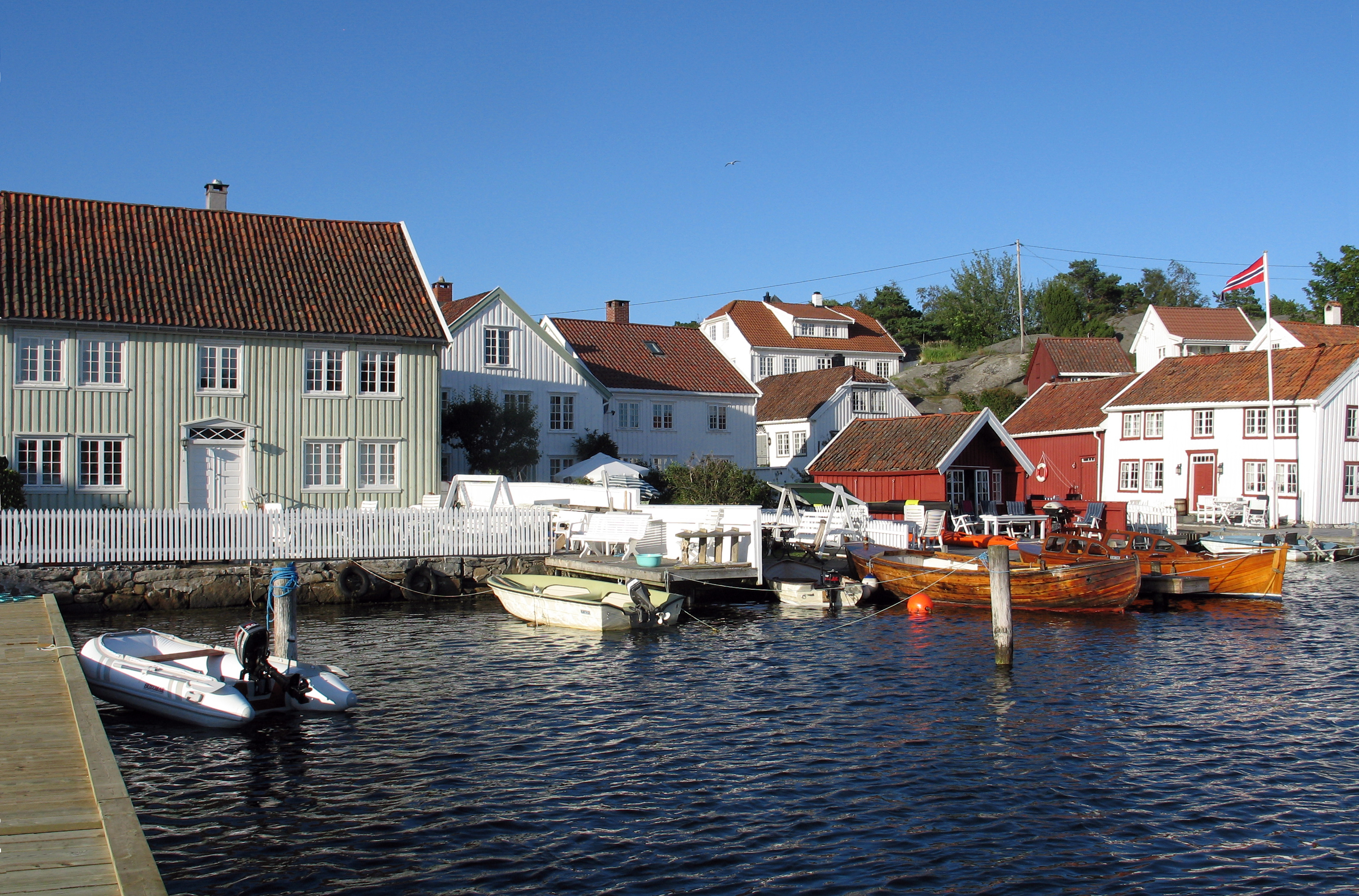
- View of the village Photo: Karl Ragnar Gjertsen
- Interactive map of Brekkestø
- Coordinates: 58.1952°N 08.3478°E
- Country: Norway
- Region: Southern Norway
- County: Agder
- Municipality: Lillesand Municipality
- Elevation: 12 m (39 ft)
- Time zone: UTC+01:00 (CET)
  - Summer (DST): UTC+02:00 (CEST)
- Post Code: 4780 Brekkestø

Brekkestø is a small village on the southern coast of Norway. It is located on the island of Justøya within Lillesand Municipality in Agder county, in the region known as Sørlandet. The village is mainly on Justøya, but there are houses and docks spread over several adjacent rocky islands. Many of the homes built around its compact harbor are white, wooden cottages with red tiled roofs, typical of the area. Brekkestø has a small general store, a filling station that provides fuel for boats only, and an ice cream kiosk open during the summer season. The village post office, located near the waterfront, was closed in 2002. Justøy Chapel is located just north of the village. The small village of Ågerøyhavn lies about 2 kilometres (1.2 mi) to the southwest on the small, nearby island of Ågerøya.

The nearest town is Lillesand, accessible by road via a network of bridges, and the closest international airport is Kjevik Airport near Kristiansand. Brekkestø is also reached by boat via the Blindleia strait, which passes nearby. Brekkestø has a reputation for being both rustic yet exclusive, and as such, it is a popular destination for summer vacationing. Brekkestø is often cited as an “idyllic pearl” of Southern Norway. Due to its popularity however, the small village is often overcrowded with Norwegian and German tourists during the peak summer months, while during the winter months, the village is virtually deserted.

== History ==
Brekkestø started off as a protected harbour for the Stutthei-farms in early 17th century, mainly due to the threats of Dutch pirates and corsairs.

During the time of sailing ships in the 18th and 19th century, Brekkestø the most commonly used winter harbour on the south coast along the Skagerrak. The harbour saw ships from many Northern European countries, and it was common that they had to wait several months before they could continue their journey. They were waiting for good weather and sailing conditions, and for the ice to disappear, or they were waiting for cargo. In the winter of 1862, there were 92 sailing ships in the harbour, so it was said that they could walk safely from island to island. Ship traffic created a lot of activity, and there were shops, apartments, hotels and duty station in the small outport.

=== Historic buildings ===
The following buildings are listed for cultural and historic protection:

- Brekkestø landhandel (the landstore)
- Tollboden (the customs house)
- Main house on Gaupholmen, built in 1764

=== Name ===
The name derives from brekke (which means "hillside") and stø (meaning the landing area for a boat).

== Attractions ==
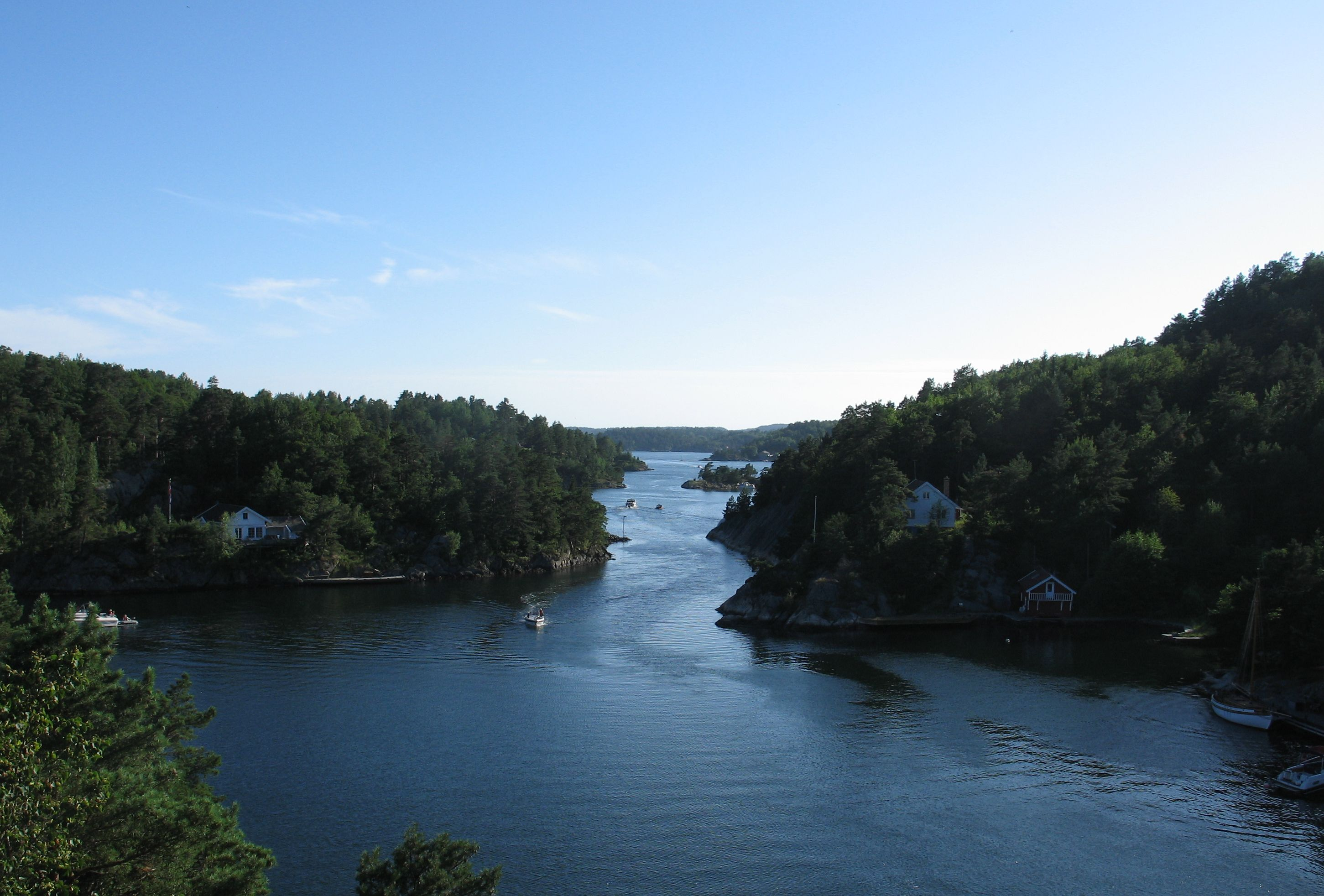
From Blindleia

Brekkestø is located close to the Blindleia strait, and there are numerous small islands to visit in the area. The village is also close to Lillesand, a Norwegian town full of the white painted houses you see in Brekkestø.

== Notable people ==
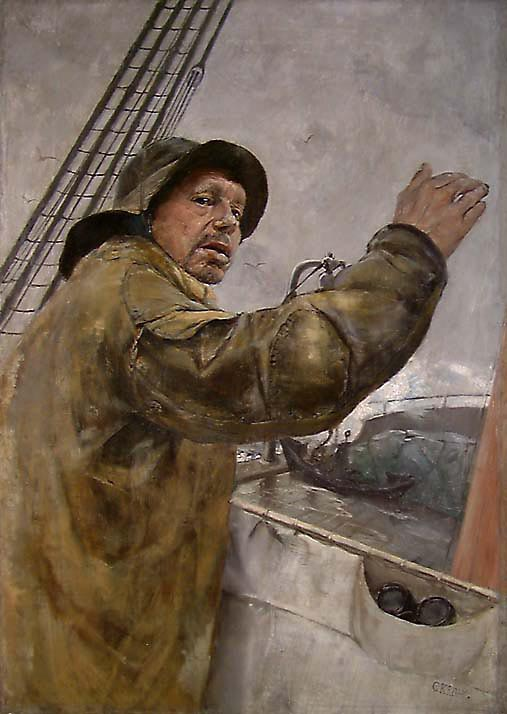
Christian Krohg

Many Norwegian artists retreated to Brekkestø for inspiration:

- Christian Krohg (13 August 1852 – 16 October 1925), was a Norwegian naturalist painter, illustrator, author and journalist.
- Nils Kjær (11 September 1870 – 9 February 1924) was a Norwegian playwright, short story writer, essayist, literary critic and theatre critic. Wrote Brekkestøbreve (Brekkestø letters).
- Gabriel Scott (8 March 1874 – 9 July 1958) was a Norwegian poet, novelist, playwright and children's writer.
