= Justøy Chapel =

Church in Agder, Norway

- Justøy kapell
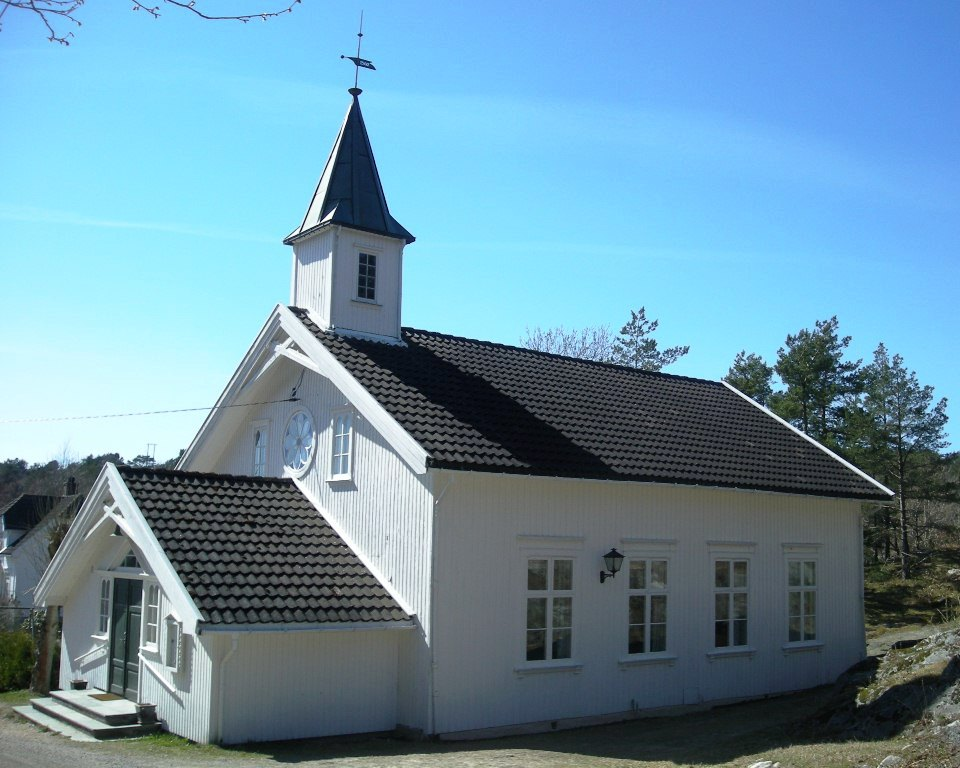
- View of the chapel
- Justøy Chapel
- 58.20482°N 08.361424°E
- Location: Lillesand Municipality, Agder
- Country: Norway
- Denomination: Church of Norway
- Churchmanship: Evangelical Lutheran
- Website: justoy-kapell.no

History
- Status: Chapel
- Founded: 1902
- Consecrated: 15 Aug 1902

Architecture
- Functional status: Active
- Architectural type: Long church
- Completed: 1884 (142 years ago)

Specifications
- Capacity: 150
- Materials: Wood

Administration
- Diocese: Agder og Telemark
- Deanery: Vest-Nedenes prosti
- Parish: Lillesand

Justøy Chapel (Norwegian: Justøy kapell) is a chapel of the Church of Norway in Lillesand Municipality in Agder county, Norway. It is located just north of the village of Brekkestø on the island of Justøya. It is an annex chapel in the Lillesand parish which is part of the Vest-Nedenes prosti (deanery) in the Diocese of Agder og Telemark. The white, wooden chapel was built in a long church style in 1884 using designs by an unknown architect. The chapel seats about 150 people.

== History ==
The building was constructed in 1884 as a prayer house on a plot of land donated by John Berge. The prayer house was consecrated on 22 November 1884. In 1902, the prayer house was converted into a chapel. The entrance was moved to the east wall and a small tower on the roof was added. An architect named Holst led the renovations. The building was consecrated as an official chapel on 15 August 1902 by the Bishop Johan Christian Heuch. In 1923, an entry porch was added to the building. In 1962, the tower was rebuilt. In 1984, the old entry porch was torn down and replaced with a new entry porch.

== Media gallery ==
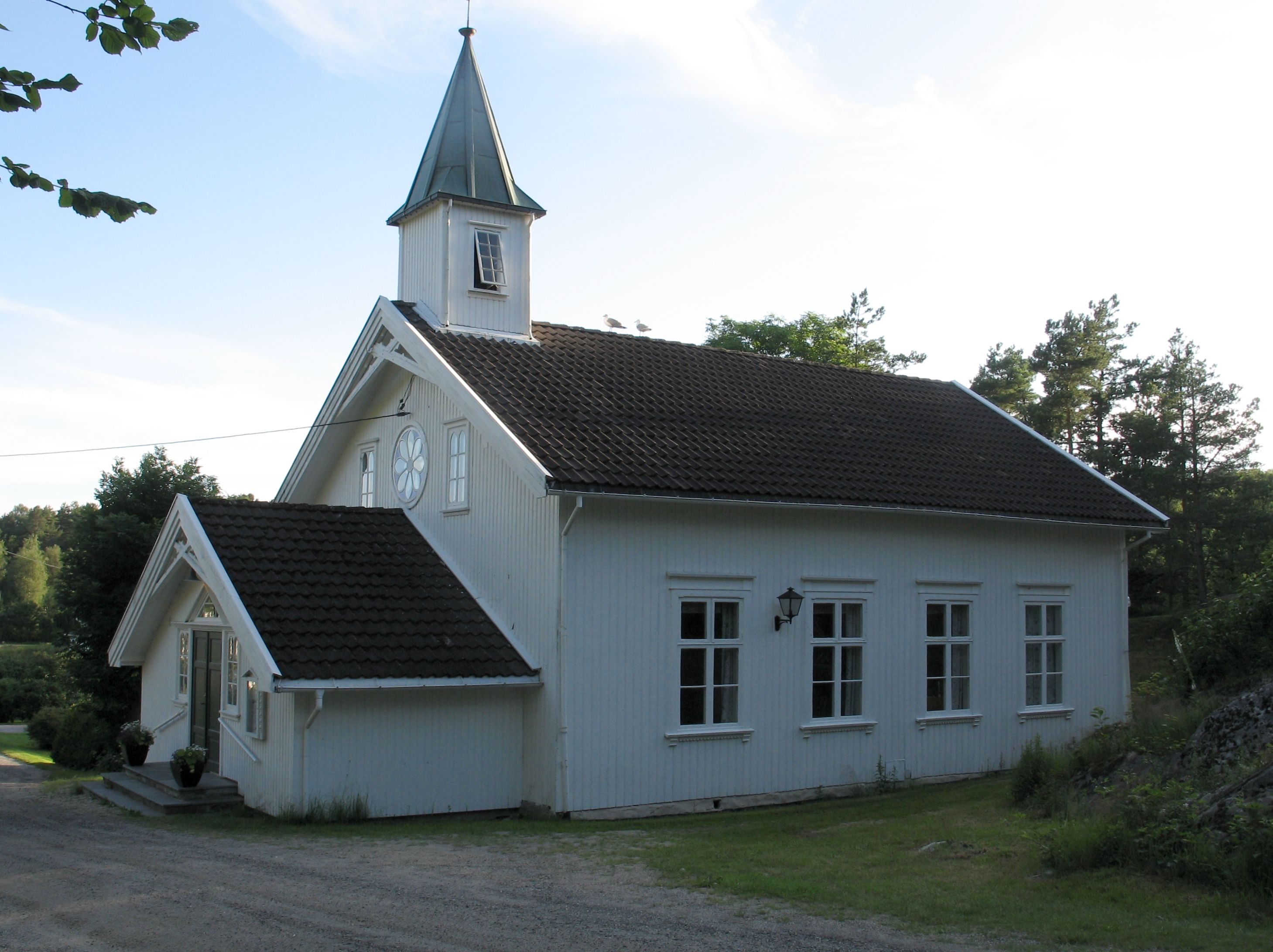

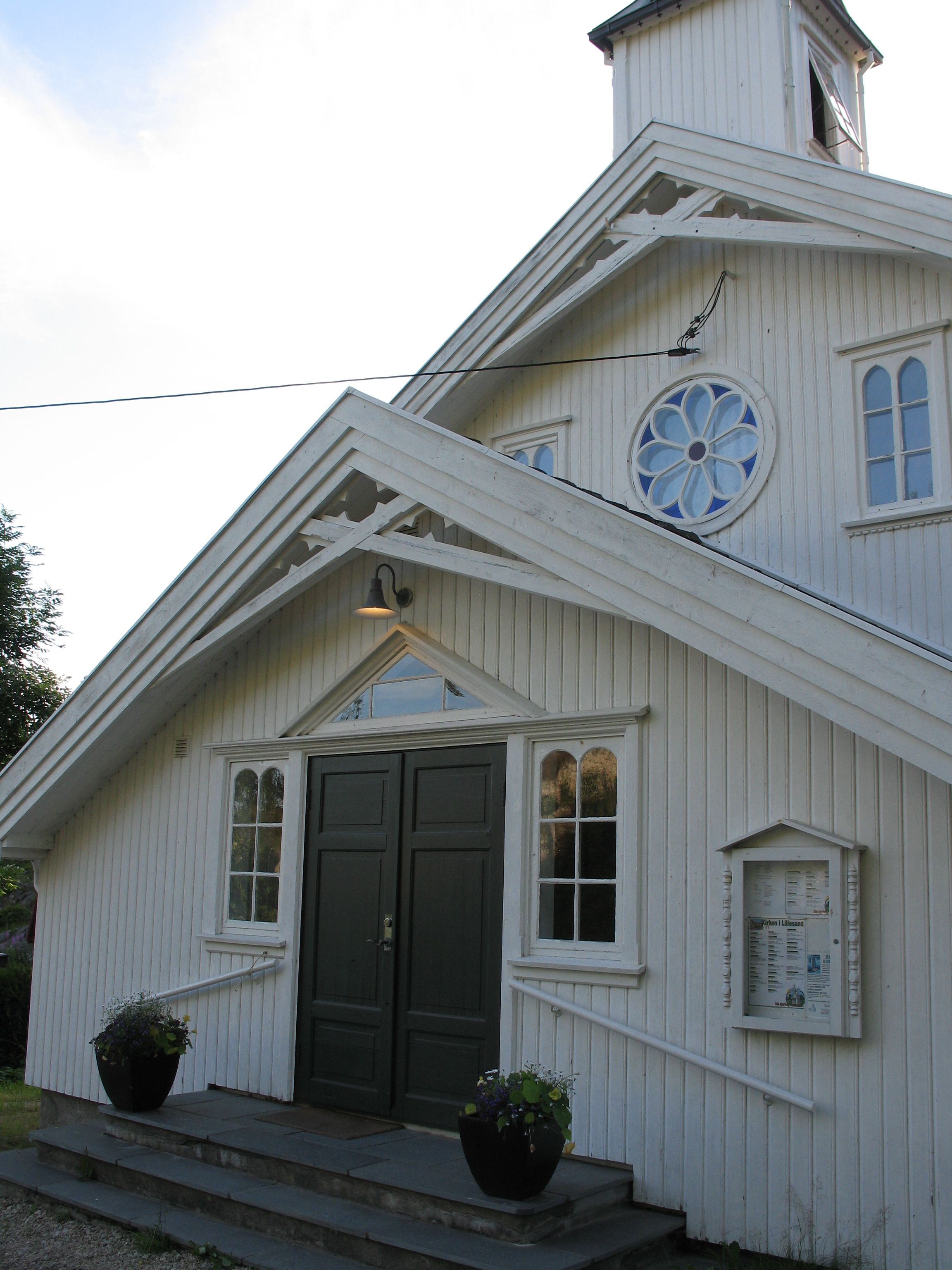

== See also ==
- List of churches in Agder og Telemark
