= Lillesand (town) =

Town in Agder, Norway

- Town/City
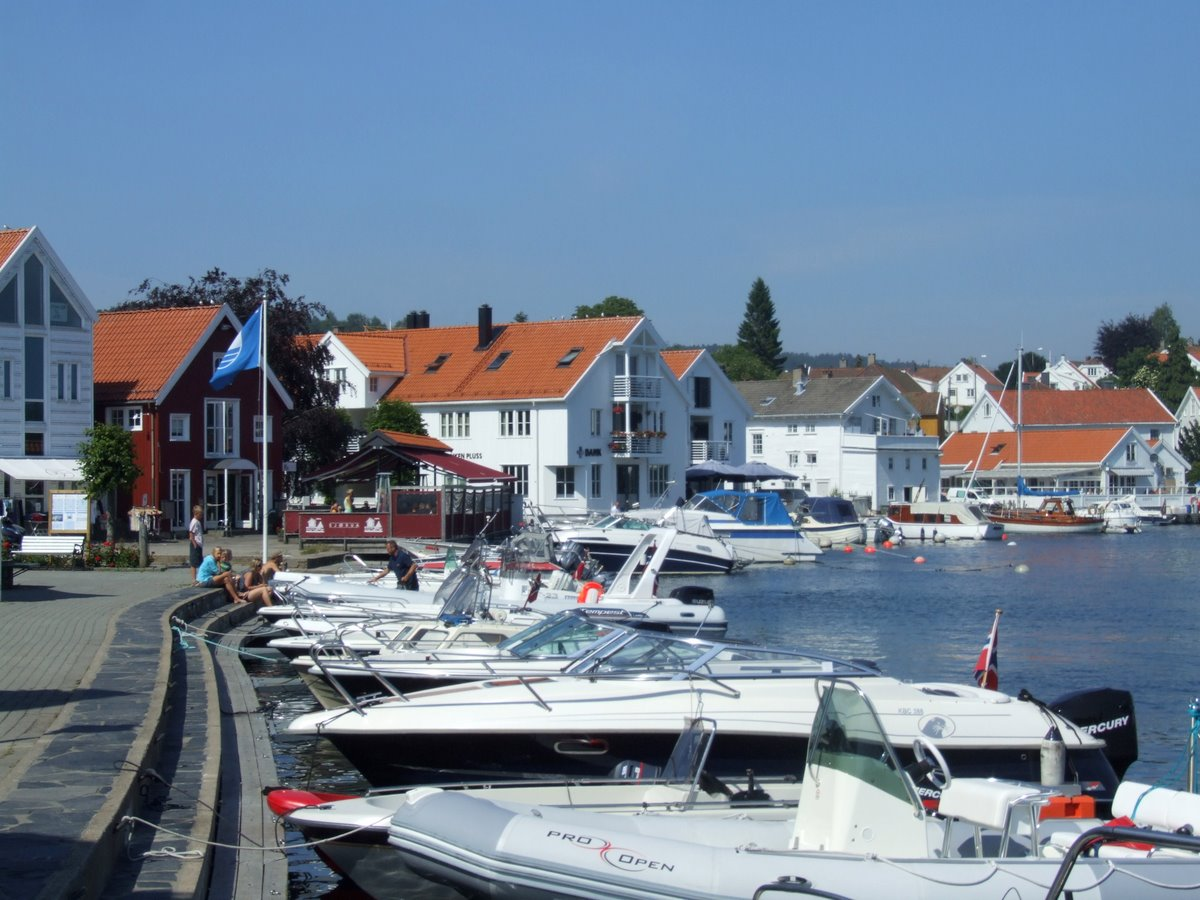
- View of the town harbour
- Interactive map of Lillesand
- Coordinates: 58.24945°N 8.37719°E
- Country: Norway
- Region: Southern Norway
- County: Agder
- Municipality: Lillesand Municipality
- Established as
- Ladested: 1821–1961
- Town (By): Since 1996

Area
  - Total: 5.48 km^{2} (2.12 sq mi)
- Elevation: 5 m (16 ft)

Population (2025)
  - Total: 8,538
  - Density: 1,558/km^{2} (4,040/sq mi)
- Demonym(s): Lillesandar; Lillesander
- Time zone: UTC+01:00 (CET)
  - Summer (DST): UTC+02:00 (CEST)
- Post Code: 4790 Lillesand

Lillesand (Norwegian pronunciation: [lilːəsan(d)]) is the administrative centre of Lillesand Municipality in Agder county, Norway. The town is located along the Skagerrak coast, about 18 kilometres (11 mi) southwest of the town of Grimstad and about 25 kilometres (16 mi) northeast of the city of Kristiansand. The 5.48-square-kilometre (1,350-acre) town has a population (2025) of 8,538 and a population density of 1,558 inhabitants per square kilometre (4,040/sq mi). In Norway, Lillesand is considered a by which can be translated as either a "town" or "city" in English.

Lillesand Church is located in the town and it is the seat of the Vest-Nedenes prosti (deanery). The European route E18 passes by the town, one of the main roads along southeastern Norway. The Blindleia strait is an inland waterway that leads from the Høvåg area northwards to the town of Lillesand.

== History ==
The village of Lillesand grew up significantly during the 17th century around its natural harbour. In 1821, the village area was granted the status as a ladested (a sea port with special trading rights). In 1838, the new formannskapsdistrikt law established each parish in Norway as a self-governing local municipality and each ladested was separate from its surrounding parish. This meant that Lillesand became a self-governing civil municipality. Later, in 1952, the town became classified as a bykommune (town-municipality).

During the 1960s, there were many municipal mergers across Norway due to the work of the Schei Committee. On 1 January 1962, the following areas were merged to form an enlarged Lillesand Municipality:

- all of the town of Lillesand (population: 1,041)
- all of Høvåg Municipality (population: 1,330)
- all of Vestre Moland Municipality (population: 2,454)
- the Gitmark farm area of Eide Municipality (population: 22)

After this merger in 1964, the new Lillesand Municipality lost is status as a bykommune (town) because of this merger. In 1996, the law changed and this enabled the municipal council of Lillesand to declare town status for Lillesand once again.

== Media gallery ==
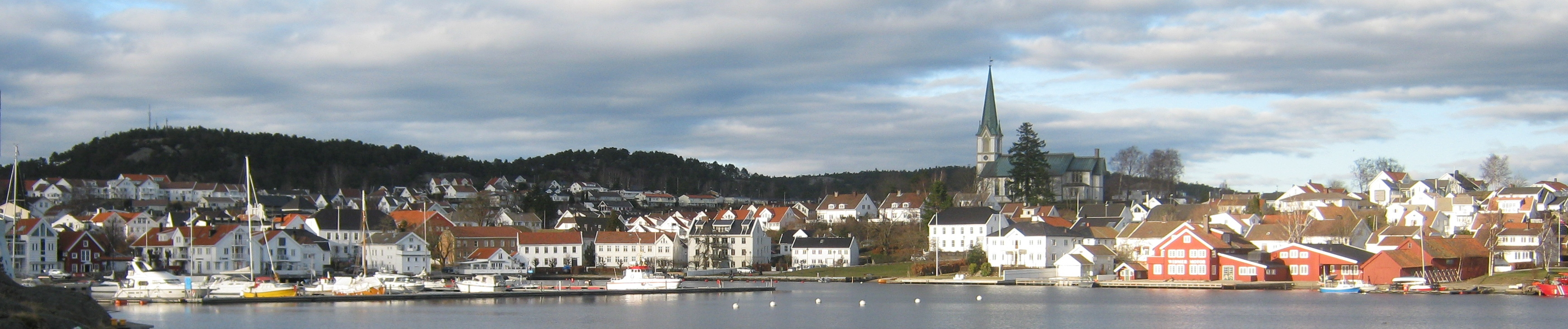
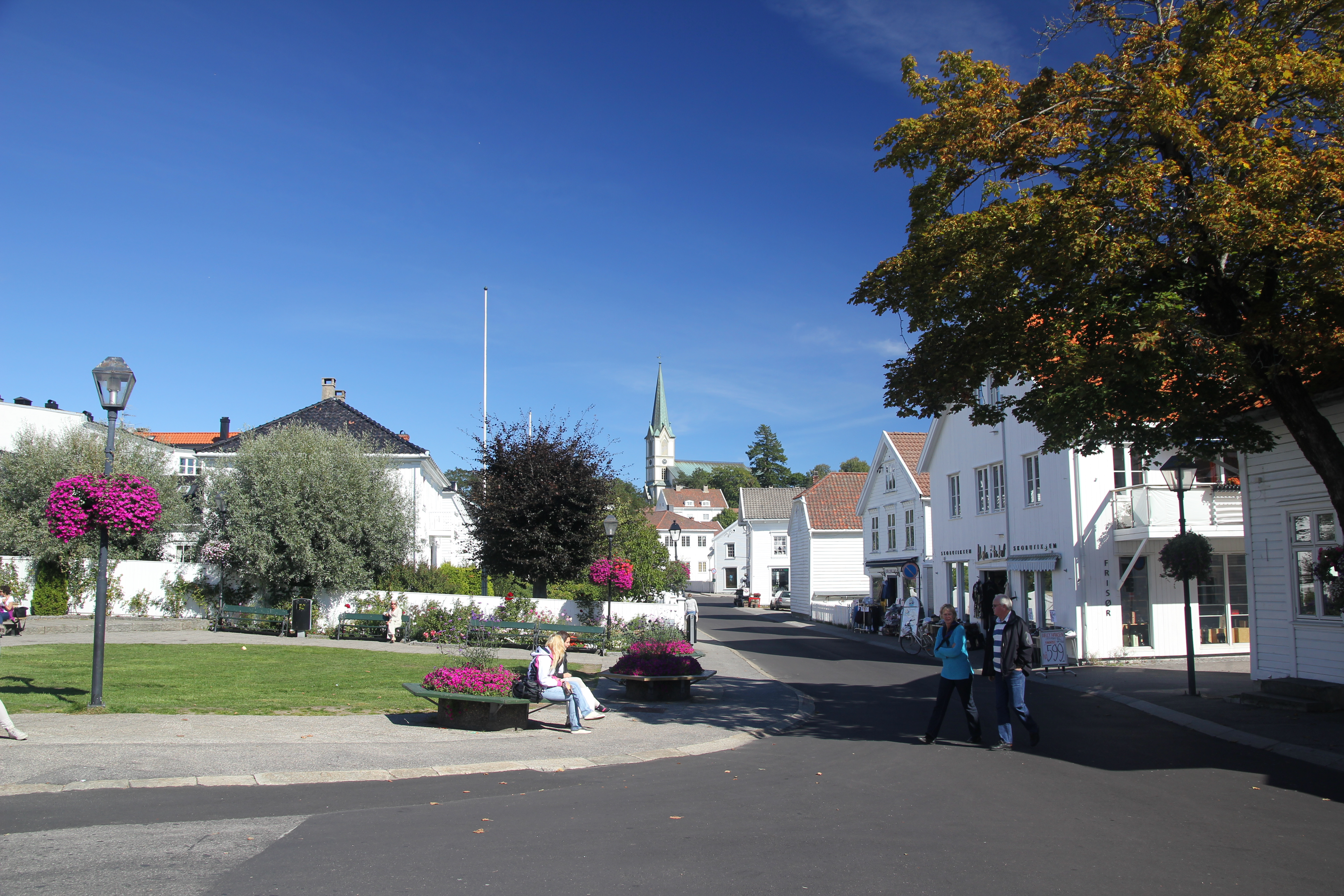
Standgata

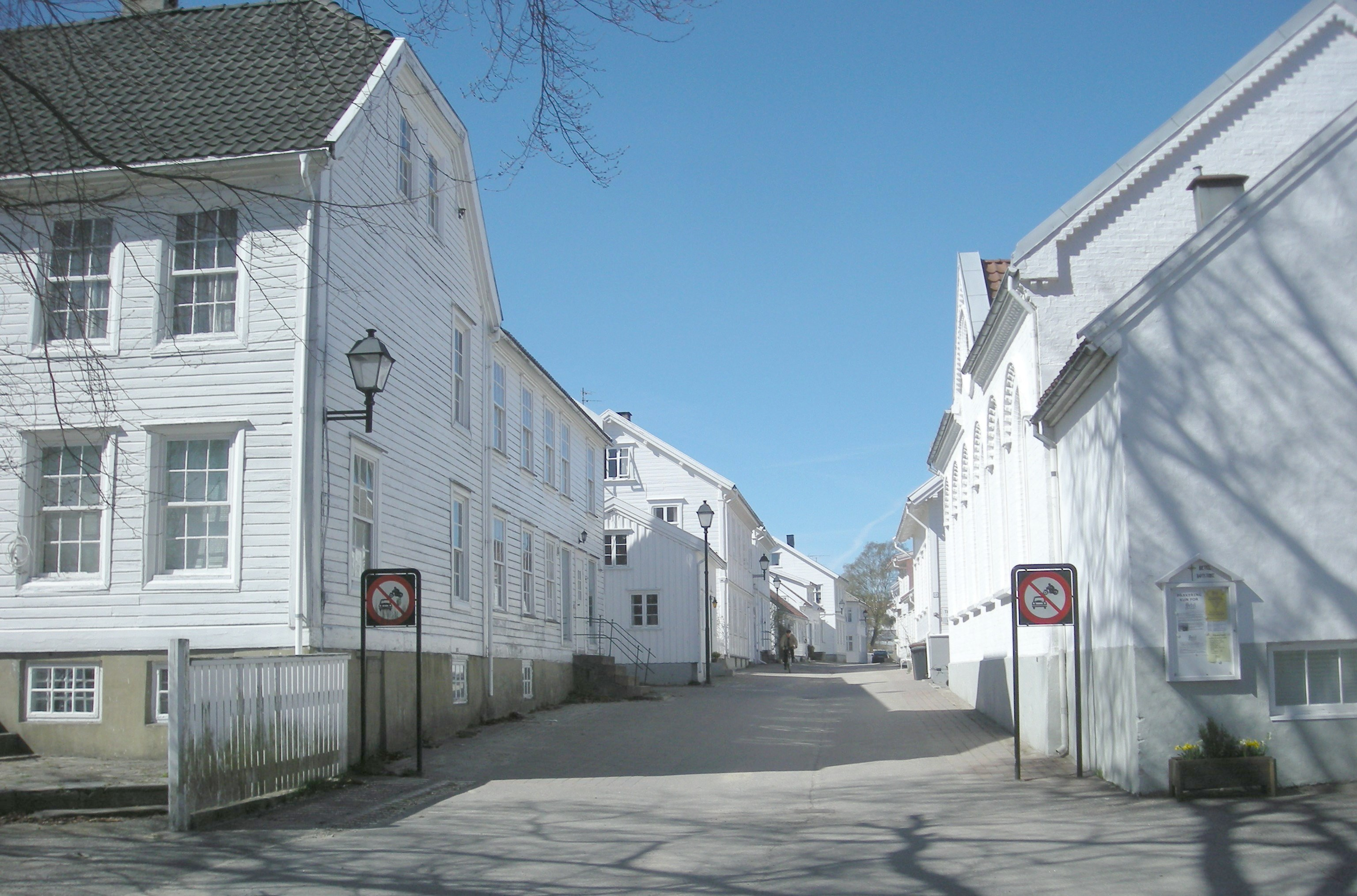
Øvre gate

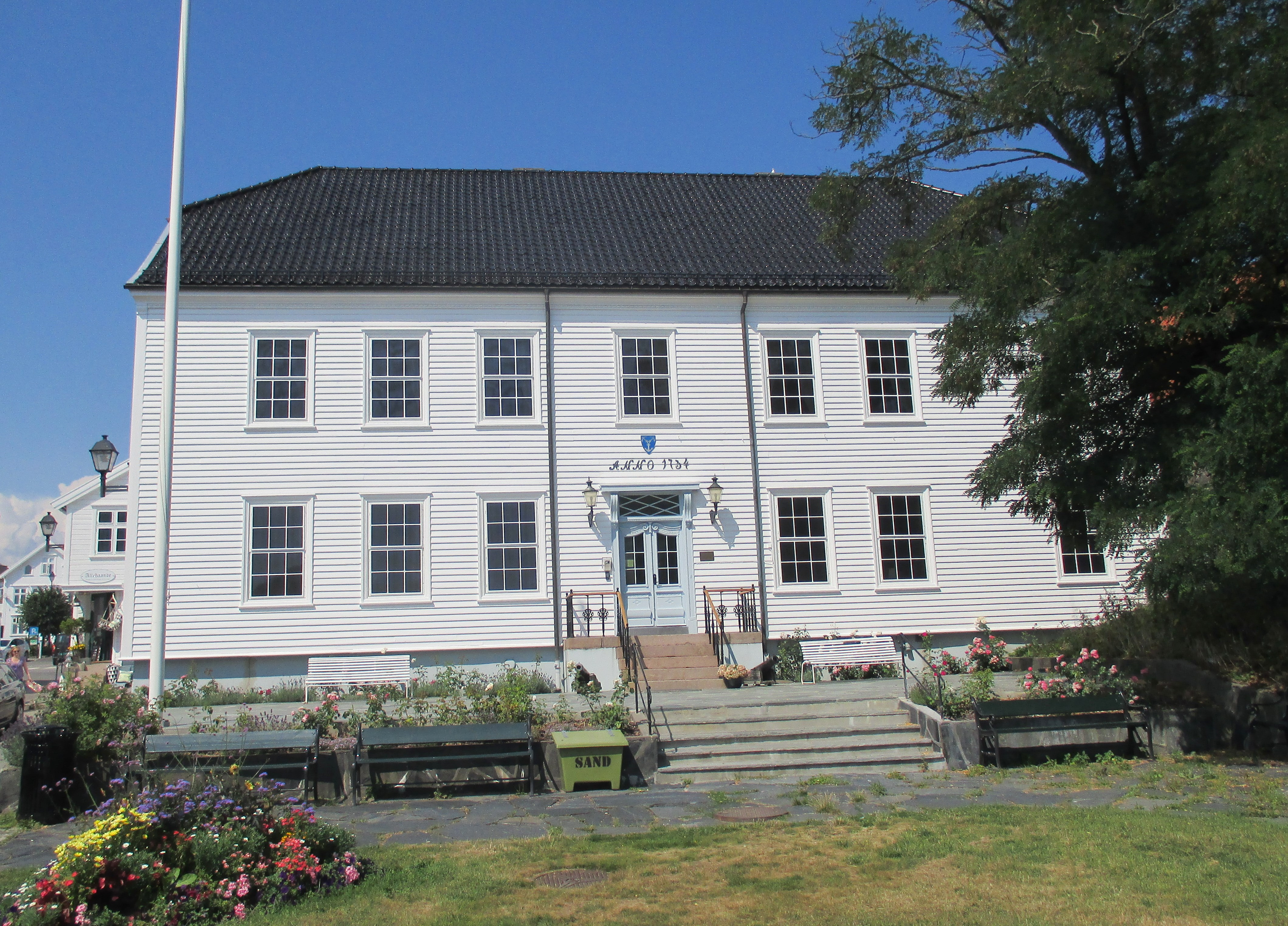
The town hall, Henschiengården

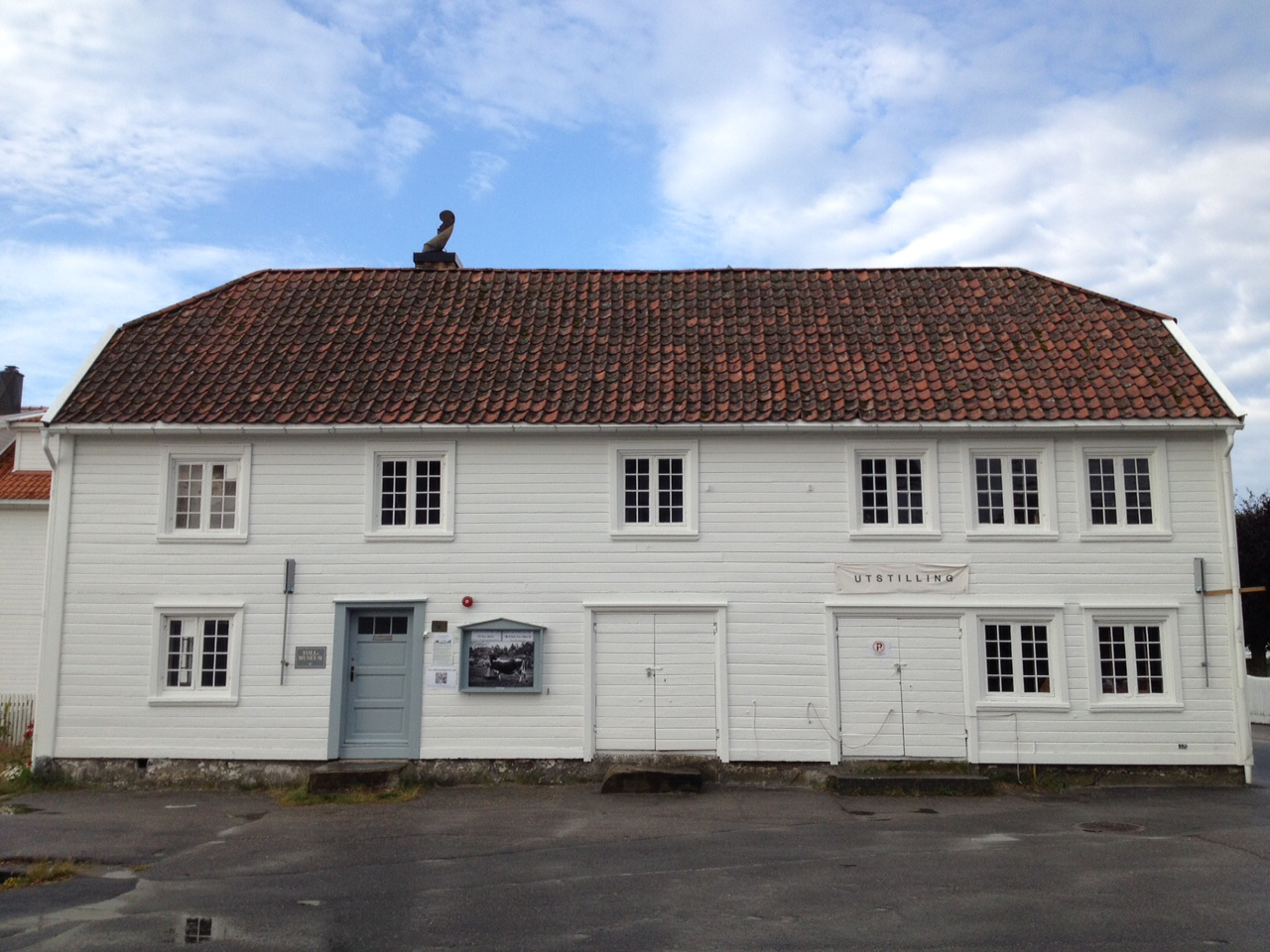
The old customs house

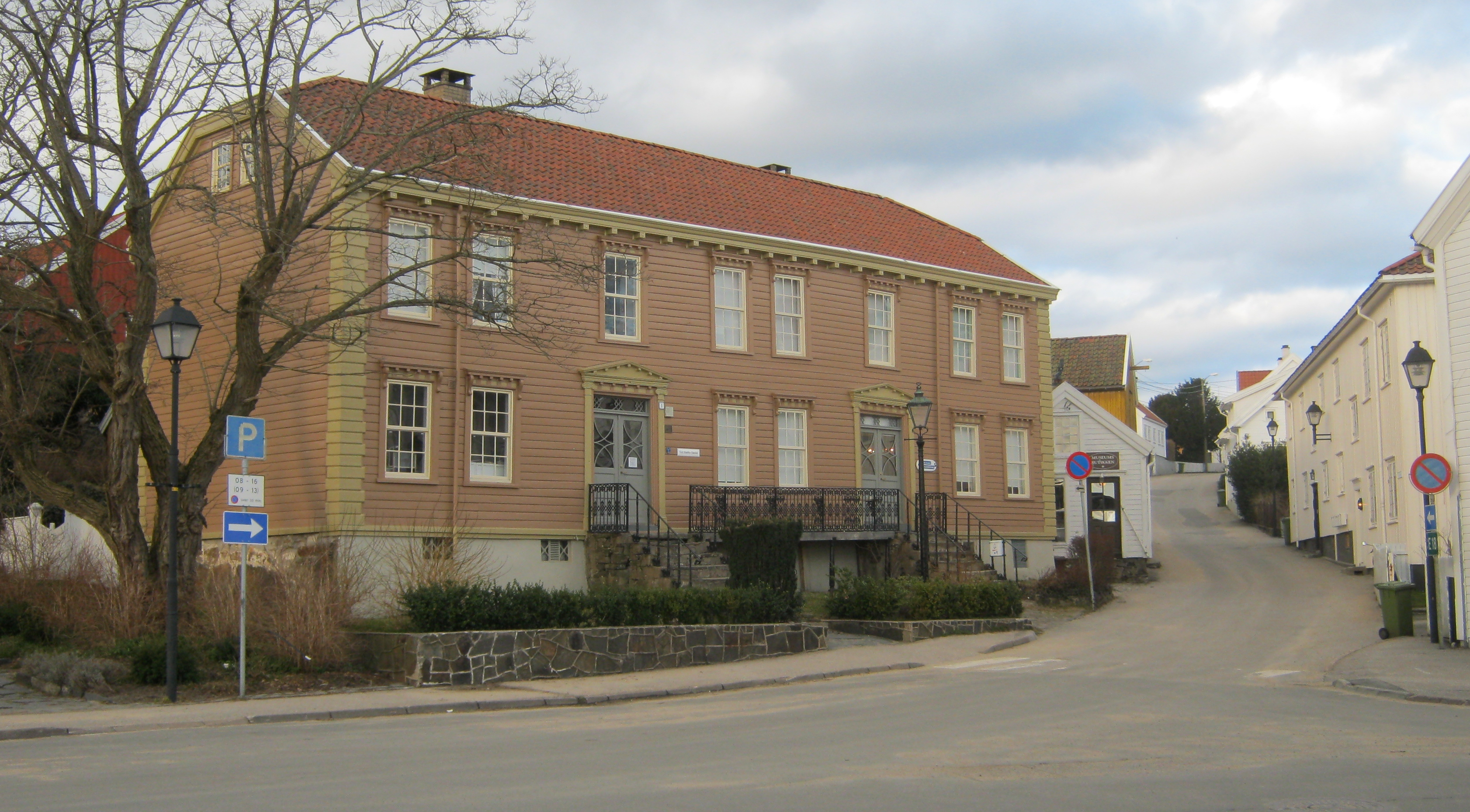
The museum at Carl Knudsen-gården

== See also ==
- List of towns and cities in Norway
