= Ågerøyhavn =

Village in Lillesand Municipality, Norway

Ågerøyhavn Åkerøyhamn (unofficial)
- Village
- Interactive map of Ågerøyhavn
- Coordinates: 58.1843°N 08.3157°E
- Country: Norway
- Region: Southern Norway
- County: Agder
- Municipality: Lillesand Municipality
- Elevation: 1 m (3.3 ft)
- Time zone: UTC+01:00 (CET)
  - Summer (DST): UTC+02:00 (CEST)
- Post Code: 4770 Høvåg

Ågerøyhavn is a village in Lillesand Municipality in Agder county, Norway. The village is located on the small island of Ågerøya, about 2 kilometres (1.2 mi) southwest of the village of Brekkestø. Ågerøyhavn is only accessible by boat, with the Blindleia strait separating it from the mainland.
