= Cappelen =

Cappelen is a Norwegian surname. Notable people with the surname include:

- Cappelen (family), a distinguished Norwegian family
- Andreas Zeier Cappelen (1915–2008), Norwegian jurist and politician
- August Cappelen (1827–1852), Norwegian painter
- Axel Cappelen (1858–1919), Norwegian surgeon
- Christine Marie von Cappelen (1766–1849), Norwegian botanist
- Diderik von Cappelen (1761–1838), Norwegian businessman and politician
- Didrik Cappelen (1900–1970), resistance fighter, county judge and politician
- Frederick William Cappelen (1857–1921), Norwegian-born architect and Minneapolis City Engineer
- Hans Cappelen (Hasse) (1903–79), businessman, resistance fighter and Norwegian witness in the Nuremberg trials
- Herman Cappelen (born 1967), Norwegian philosopher
- Johan Cappelen (1889–1947), Norwegian jurist and politician
- Jørgen Wright Cappelen (1805–1878), Norwegian bookseller and publisher
- Nicolai Benjamin Cappelen (1795–1866), Norwegian jurist and politician
- Pål Cappelen (born 1947), Norwegian handball player
- Peder von Cappelen (1763–1837), Norwegian merchant and politician
- Sofie Cappelen (born 1982), Norwegian actress
- Ulrich Fredrich von Cappelen (1770–1820), Norwegian ship owner and businessman
- Ulrik Frederik Cappelen (1797–1864), Norwegian jurist and politician

== See also ==
- J.W. Cappelens Forlag, a Norwegian publishing house founded in 1829
- Cappelen Damm, a Norwegian publisher established in 2007 following the merger of J.W. Cappelens Forlag and N.W. Damm & Søn
- F.W. Cappelen Memorial Bridge, a bridge in Minneapolis, United States
- Cappeln, a municipality in Germany
