= Hans J. C. Aall =

Norwegian politician

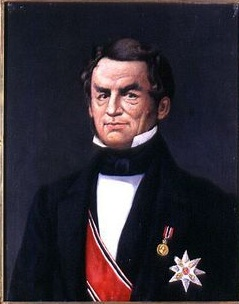

Hans Jørgen Christian Aall (4 November 1806 – 24 February 1894) was a Norwegian jurist and elected official.

== Biography ==
He was born on Næs Jernverk in Holt (now part of Tvedestrand Municipality) in Nedenes, Norway. He was the son of Jacob Aall (1773–1844) and Lovise Andrea Stephansen (1779–1825). Like his father, his uncles Niels and Jacob were involved in politics. His aunt Benedicte Henrikke Aall (1772–1812), married Ulrich Fredrich von Cappelen and another aunt Inger Aall (1774–1856) married Hans Eleonardus Møller Sr. As such he was a cousin of political figures Hans Eleonardus Møller, Ulrik Frederik Cappelen and Nicolai Benjamin Cappelen and publishing house founder Jørgen Wright Cappelen.

Aall attended Drammen Latin School and was graduated in 1822. He studied law at the University of Christiania and was awarded a Master of Arts degree in 1827. Aall started his career as a jurist. From 1840 Aall worked as an assessor at the higher dioceseal court of Bergen. He also became involved in politics, having been elected to the Norwegian Parliament in 1842 and 1845.

From 1846 to 1877 served as County Governor of Bratsberg (now Telemark). He had married Mariane, née Møller (1812–1897), from Gjerpen Municipality and settled there. He was re-elected to the Norwegian Parliament in 1851, 1854, 1859–60, 1862–63 and 1868–1869, representing the rural constituency of Bratsberg Amt. While a parliament member he served as President of the Storting several times. He was a proponent of development of transport and communications, especially railroad from Drammen to Skien and the sluice canal in the Skien watershed. This canal would become the Telemark Canal (Telemarkskanalen). Aall later moved to Christiania (now Oslo) with his wife. They had no children.

Government offices
Preceded by Carl Valentin Falsen	County Governor of Bratsberg amt 1846–1877	Succeeded by Niels Mathias Rye
