= Cappelen (family) =

Norwegian family of German origin

- Current region: Norway
- Origin: Germany

Cappelen is a Norwegian family of German origin. Johan von Cappelen immigrated to Norway in 1653 and became bailiff in Lier. A number of his descendants were businessmen, land owners, civil servants and politicians. The family is especially known for the former publishing company J.W. Cappelens Forlag, one of the oldest publishing houses of Norway. Variants of the name Cappelen are also used throughout Germany by many other families.

== History ==
The family originated in Cappeln near Wildeshausen in Oldenburg in Lower Saxony, Germany with Johan von Cappelen (1627–1688), who immigrated to Norway from Bremen in 1653. Johan von Cappelen bought several properties and ended as a bailiff in Lier, Buskerud County, Norway. The family's main branches originated from three of his sons:

- Johan von Cappelen the Younger (1658–1698), named after his father was bailiff in Lier, Norway
- Ulrich Friderich von Cappelen (1668–1722), timber merchant who ran a sawmill in Skien, Telemark County, Norway
- Gabriel von Cappelen (1674–1758), timber merchant in Bragernes in Drammen, Buskerud County, Norway

Jørgen Wright Cappelen, a later member of the family, founded the publishing house J. W. Cappelens Forlag. The family in Norway had stopped using the von in the 19th century.

== Notable members ==
- Jørgen von Cappelen (1715–1785), titular councillor of state (etatsråd), businessman and owner of Fossesholm Manor
- Diderich von Cappelen (1734–1794), Skien, merchant, landowner and shipowner
- Didrich von Cappelen (1761–1828), Skien, member of the Eidsvoll assembly in 1814
- Peder von Cappelen (1763–1837), Drammen, merchant, iron works owner and politician and his wife, Christine Marie von Cappelen (née Klein, 1766–1849), botanist
- Ulrich Fredrich von Cappelen (1770–1820), Porsgrunn, merchant and ship-owner
- Nicolai Benjamin Cappelen (1795–1866), Skien, county judge and politician
- Diderik von Cappelen (1795–1866), also spelled Diderich, acquired and owned Ulefos Jernværk and Holden Manor, Ulefoss
- Ulrik Frederik Cappelen (1797–1864), Larvik, county governor and politician
- Nils Otto Tank (1800–1864), Wisconsin, missionary and pioneer land developer, son of Catherine von Cappelen married to Carsten Tank
- Jørgen Wright Cappelen (1805–78), Oslo (Christiania), founder of the publishing house J.W. Cappelens Forlag
- Severin Diderik Cappelen (1822–1881), owner of Ulefos Jernværk and Holden Manor
- August Cappelen (1827–52), Düsseldorf, painter
- Frants Diecke Cappelen Beyer, Bergen, (1851–1918), composer
- Anna Sofie Cappelen (1854–1915), heiress to the Borgestad Manor and married to Prime Minister Gunnar Knudsen
- Johan Christian Severin Cappelen (1855–1935), Trondheim, physician and politician
- Diderik Cappelen (1856–1935), chamberlain at the royal court, owner of Ulefos Jernværk and Holden Manor. He discovered the mineral cappelenite, named after him
- Frederick William Cappelen (1857–1921), city engineer in Minneapolis. Cappelen Memorial Bridge is named after him
- Axel Cappelen (1858–1919), Stavanger, surgeon
- Elias Anton Cappelen Smith (1873–1949), New York City, Norwegian American civil engineer and metallurgist
- Didrik Cappelen (1873–1941) (Diddi), Skien, Supreme Court barrister and resistance fighter, father of Didrik and Hans Cappelen
- Johan Munthe Cappelen (1884–1962), judge
- Didrik Arup Seip (1884–1963), professor at University of Oslo (descendant through his father's maternal grandmother)
- Didrik Cappelen Schiøtt (1887–1958), Skien, married to Margit Schiøtt, member of Stortinget, the Norwegian parliament
- Johan Cappelen (1889–1947), Trondheim, Supreme Court barrister, county governor and Minister of Justice
- Carl Otto Løvenskiold (1898–1969), Bærum, landowner (descendant through his maternal grandfather Diderik Cappelen Blom (1834–1894))
- Didrik Cappelen (1900–1970) (Dixe), Skien, resistance fighter, county judge and politician
- Jørgen Mathiesen (1901–1993), Eidsvoll, landowner (descendant through his maternal grandmother Martine Cappelen Kiær)
- Hans Cappelen (1903–1979) (Hasse), Oslo, businessman, resistance fighter and Norwegian witness in the Nuremberg trials
- Nic Waal (Caroline Schweigaard Nicolaysen) (1905–1960), Oslo, psychiatrist (descendant of Diderich von Cappelen (1796–1862))
- Ferdinand Finne (1910–1999), Oslo, painter (descendant of Severin Diderik Cappelen)
- Johan Zeier Cappelen (1913–2007), Oslo, ambassador
- Andreas Zeier Cappelen (1915–2008), Stavanger, justiciar, government minister (several posts including Foreign Minister)
- Bodil Cappelen (born 1930), artist
- Peder Wright Cappelen (1931–1992), Bærum, author, publisher and father of Herman Cappelen
- Trond Reinertsen (born 1945), Trondheim, economist and business leader (descendant through E.A.Smith)
- Pål Cappelen (born 1947), handball player
- Johan Kristoffer Cappelen Stensrud (1953–2021), Stavanger, one of Skagen Funds founders
- Berit Bertling Cappelen (born 1966), novelist
- Herman Cappelen (born 1967), philosopher
- Thomas Cappelen Malling (born 1970), author and director
- Sofie Cappelen (born 1982), actress
- Sebastian Cappelen (born 1990), Danish professional golfer

== Gallery ==
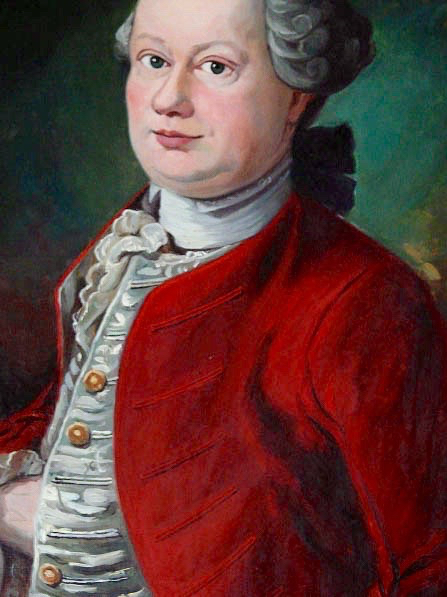
Jørgen von Cappelen, titular councillor of state

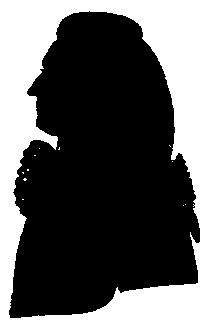
Diderich von Cappelen, father of Didrich, Peder, Ulrich Fredrich and Cathrine von Cappelen

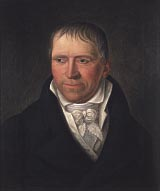
Didrich von Cappelen, member of the Norwegian Constitutional Assembly in 1814

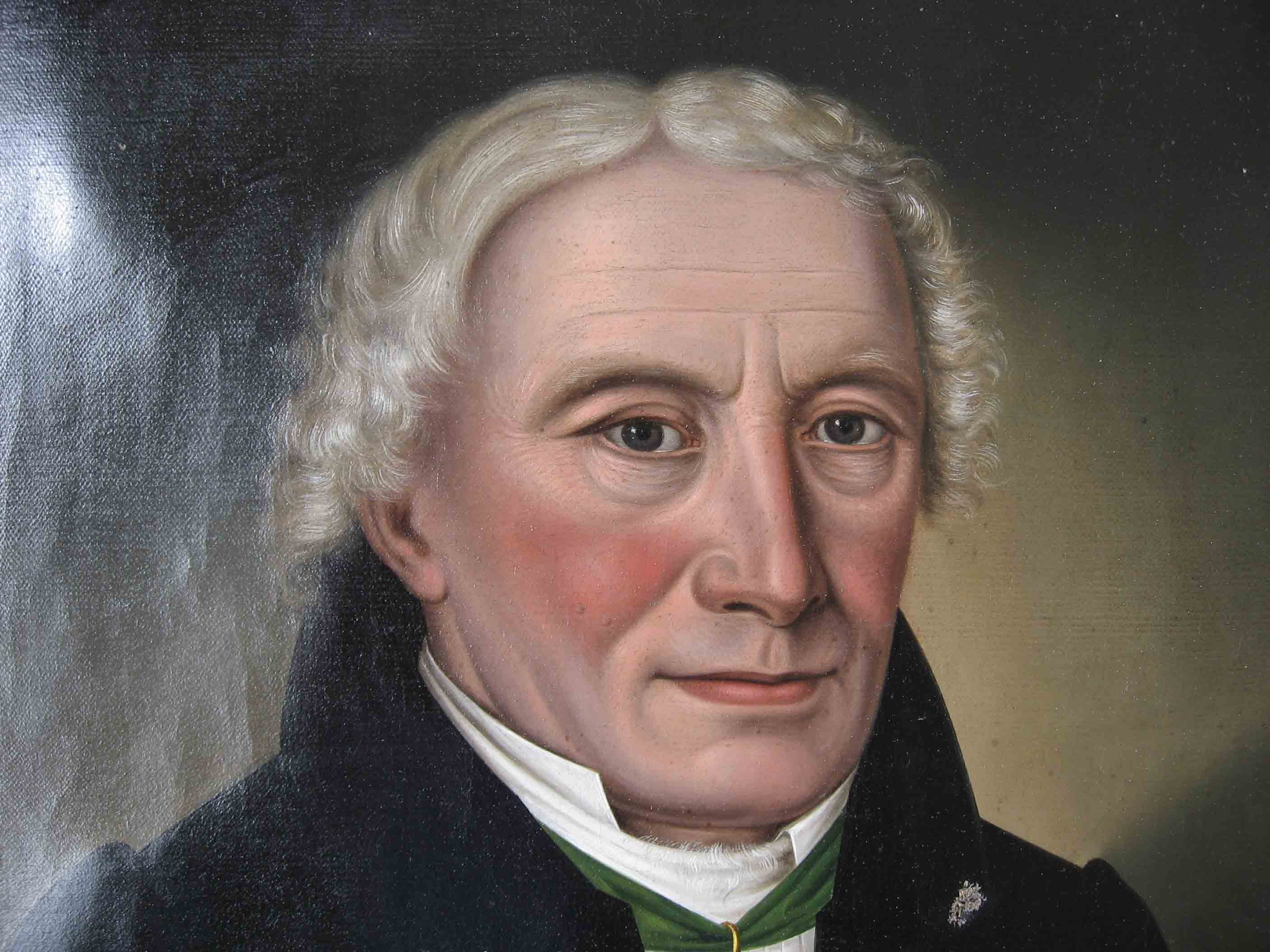
Peder von Cappelen, owner of Eidsfoss Jernverk, Austad Manor, Cappelen Townhouse etc.

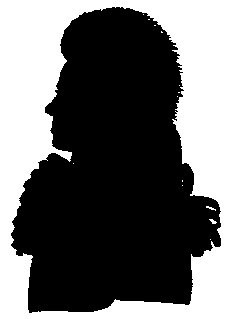
Ulrich Fredrich von Cappelen, merchant and shipowner

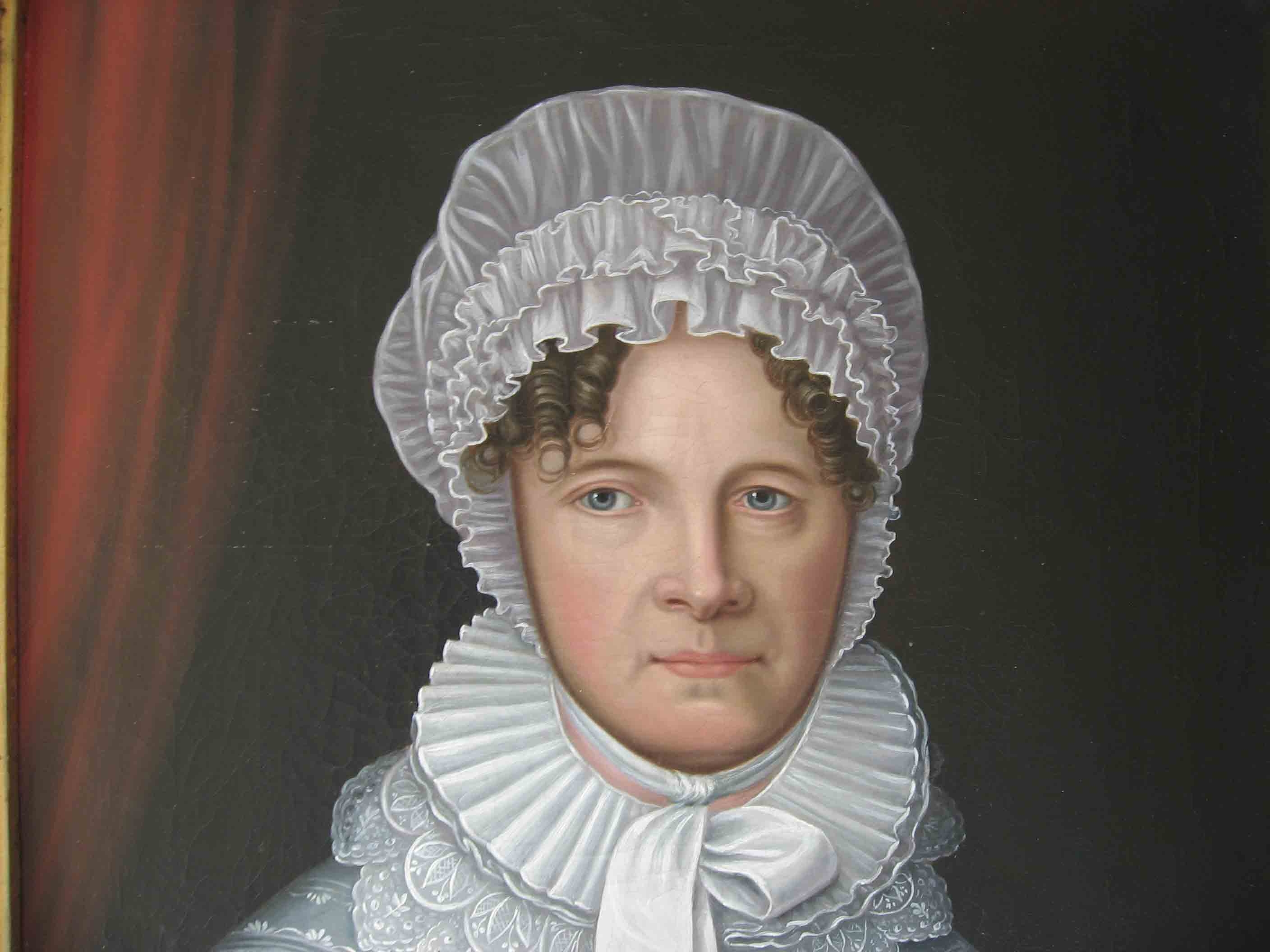
Cathrine von Cappelen married to Carsten Tank

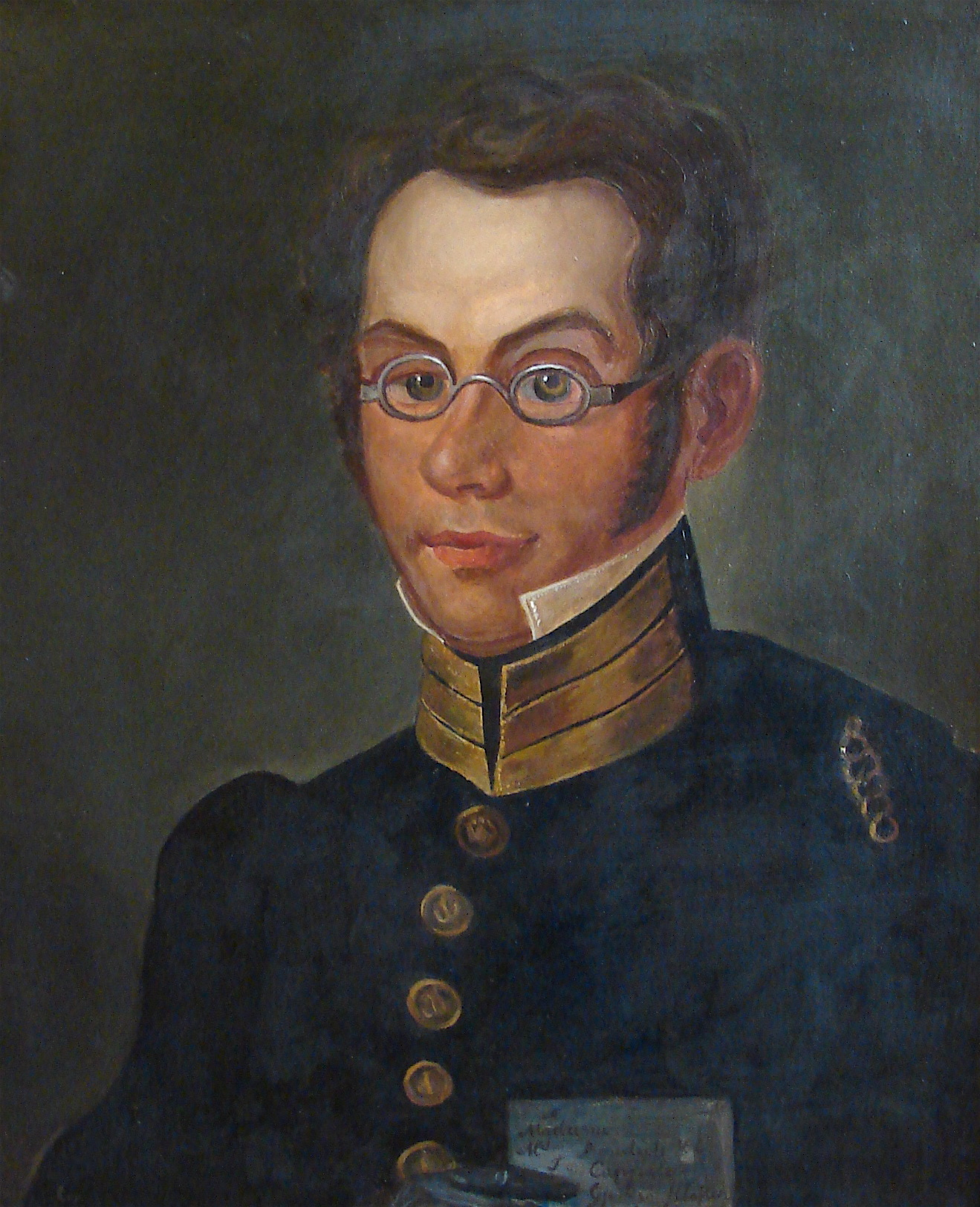
Nicolai Benjamin Cappelen, county judge

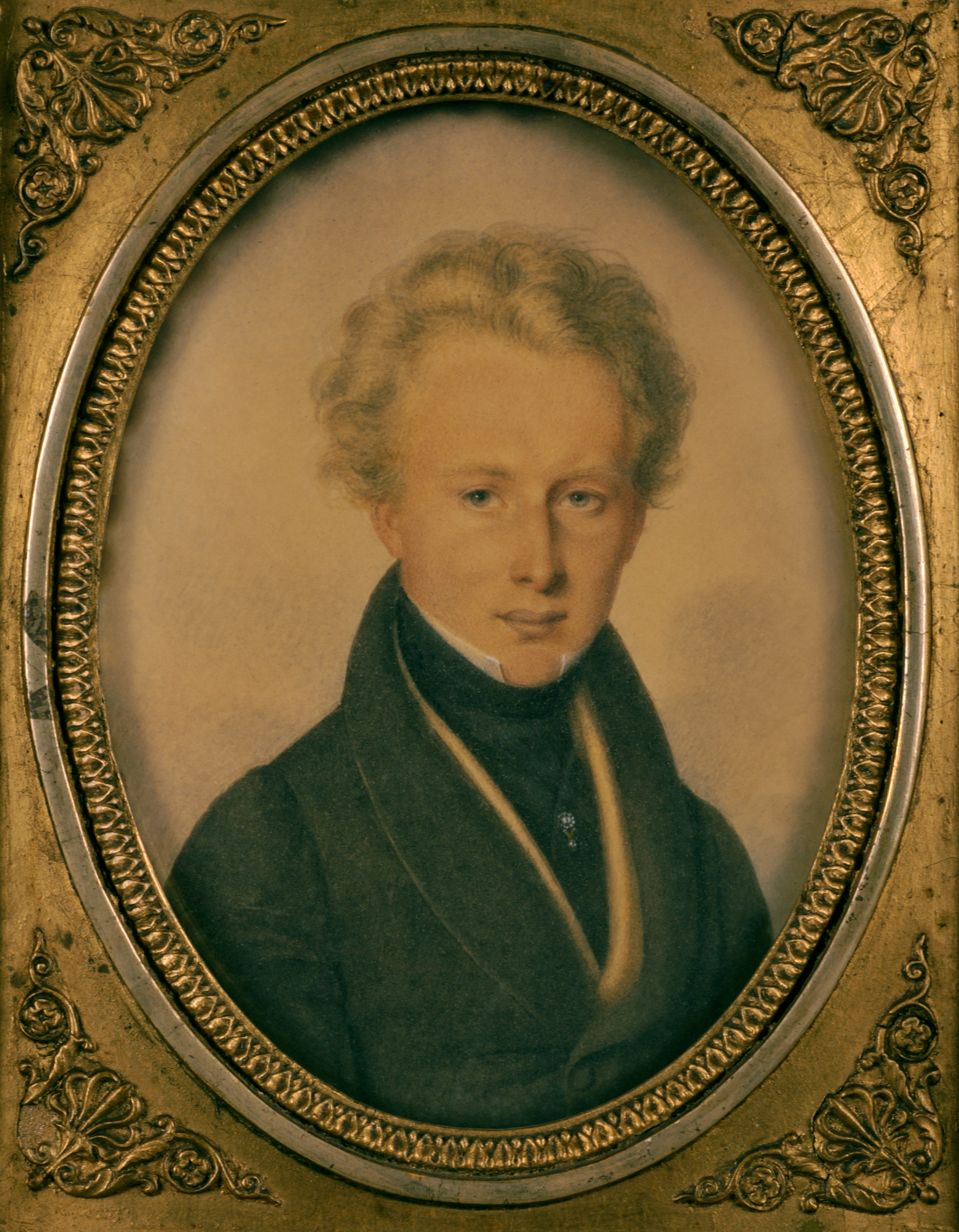
Hans Cappelen, landowner and son of Didrich

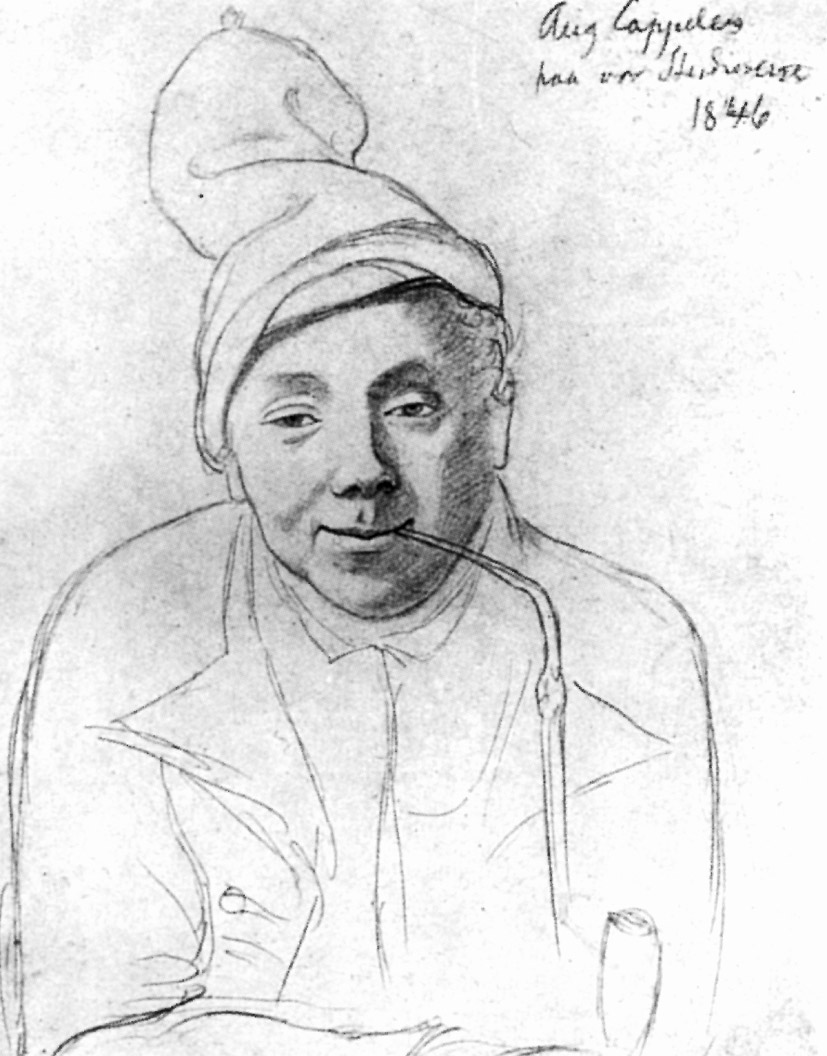
August Cappelen, drawing by Hans Gude

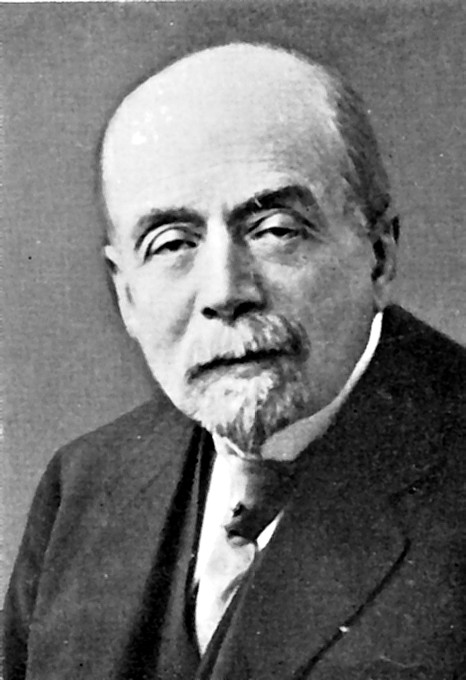
Diderik Cappelen (1856–1935), Ulefos Jernværk

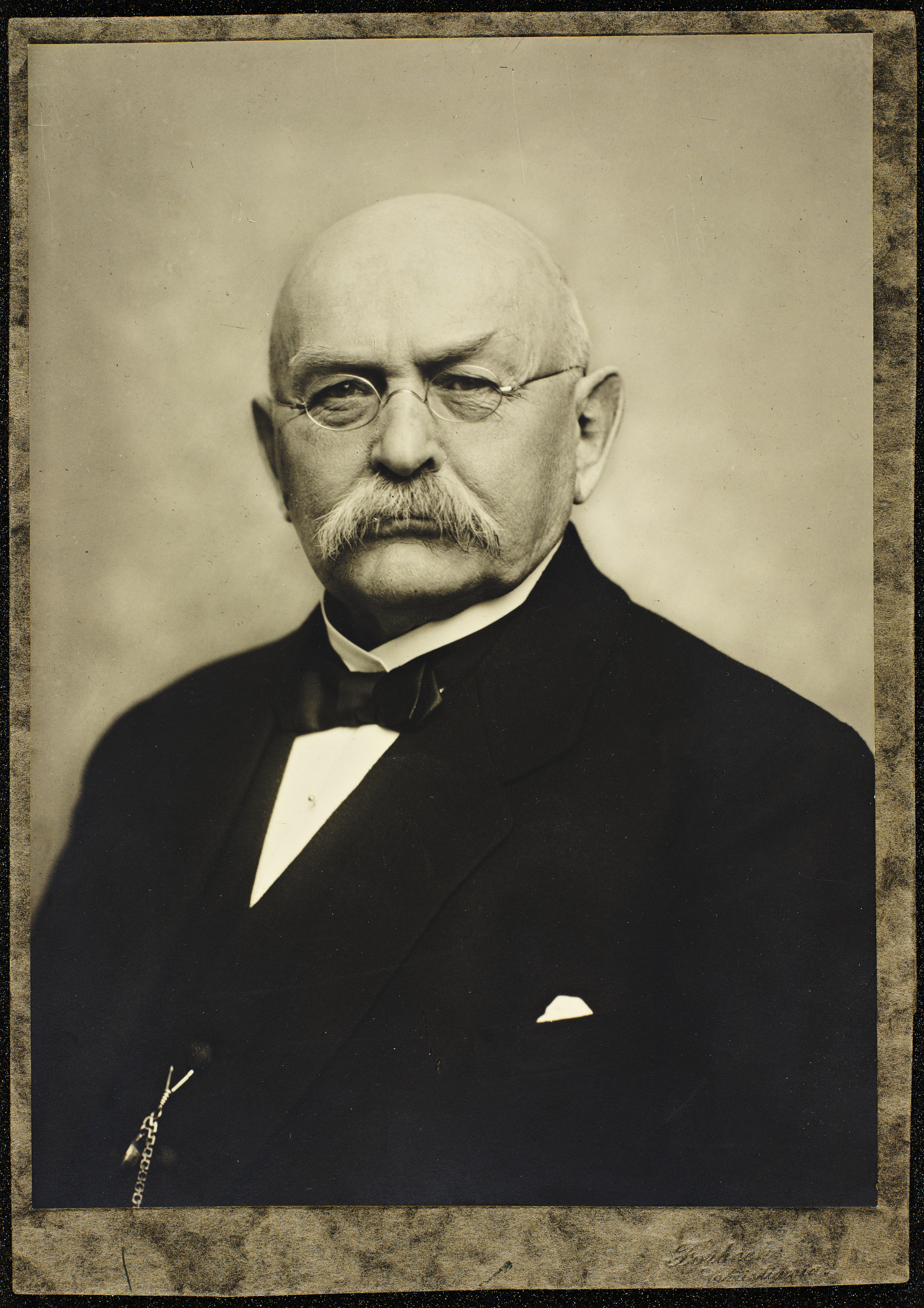
Gunnar Knudsen married to Sofie Cappelen

Elias Anton Cappelen Smith

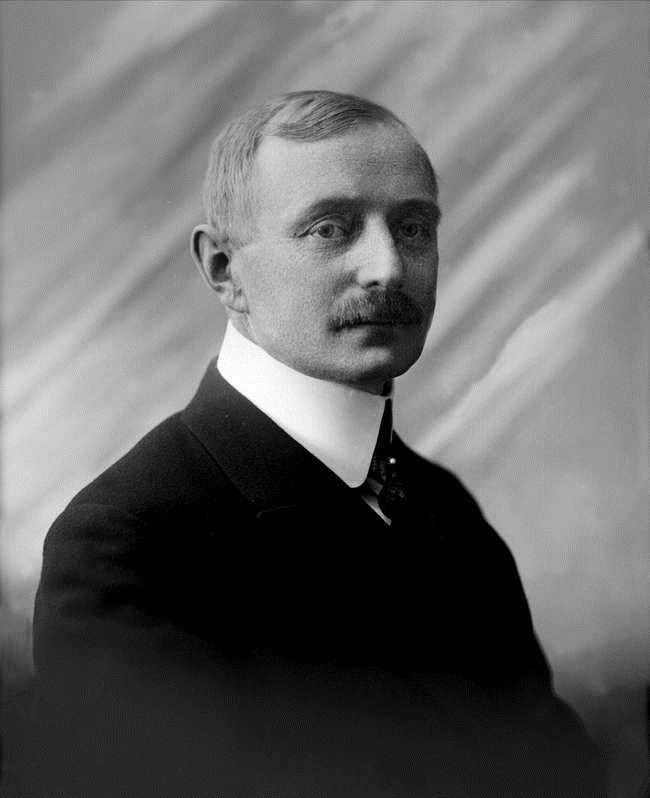
Didrik Cappelen, father of Didrik and Hans Cappelen

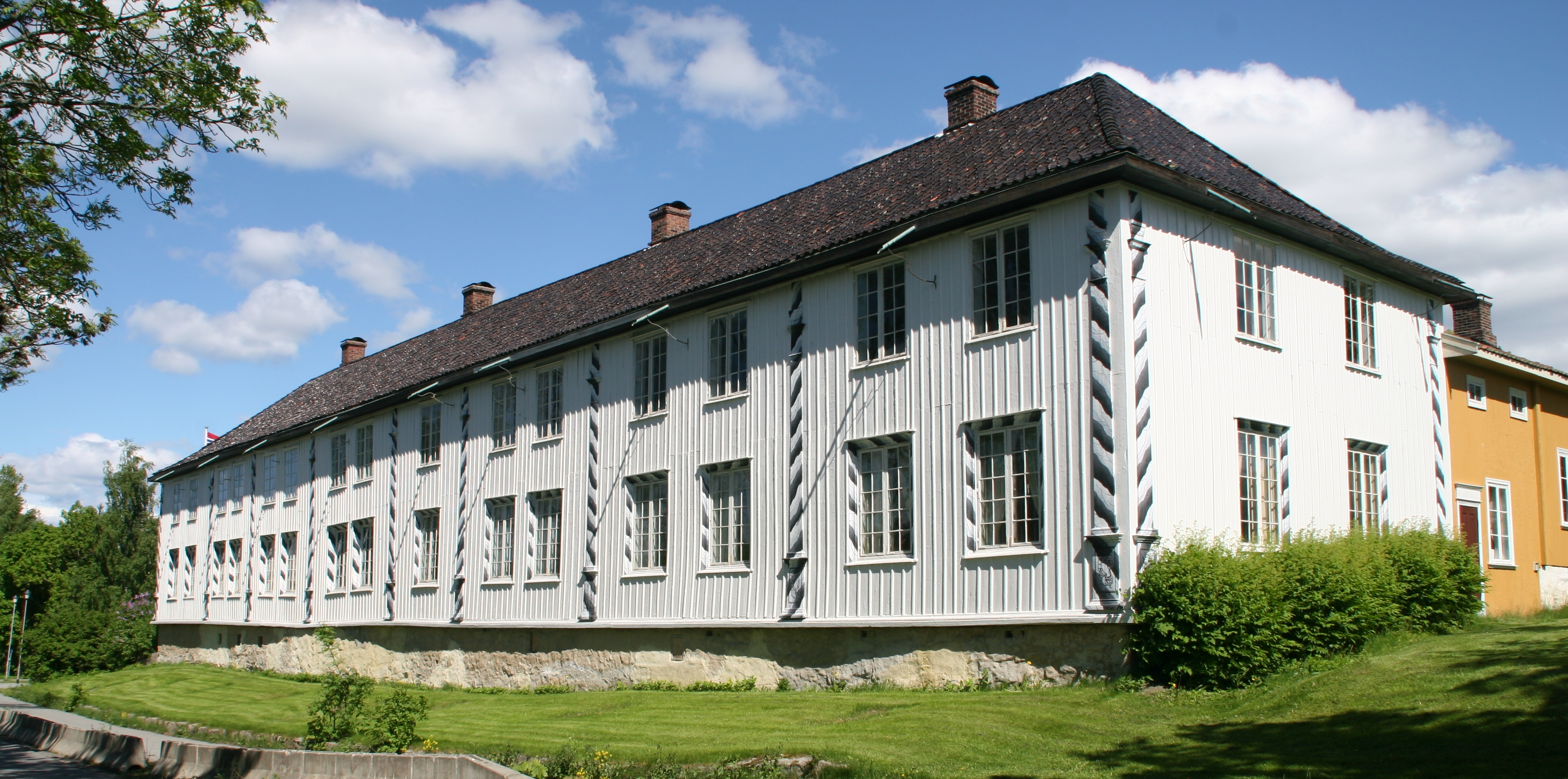
Fossesholm Manor, Vestfossen

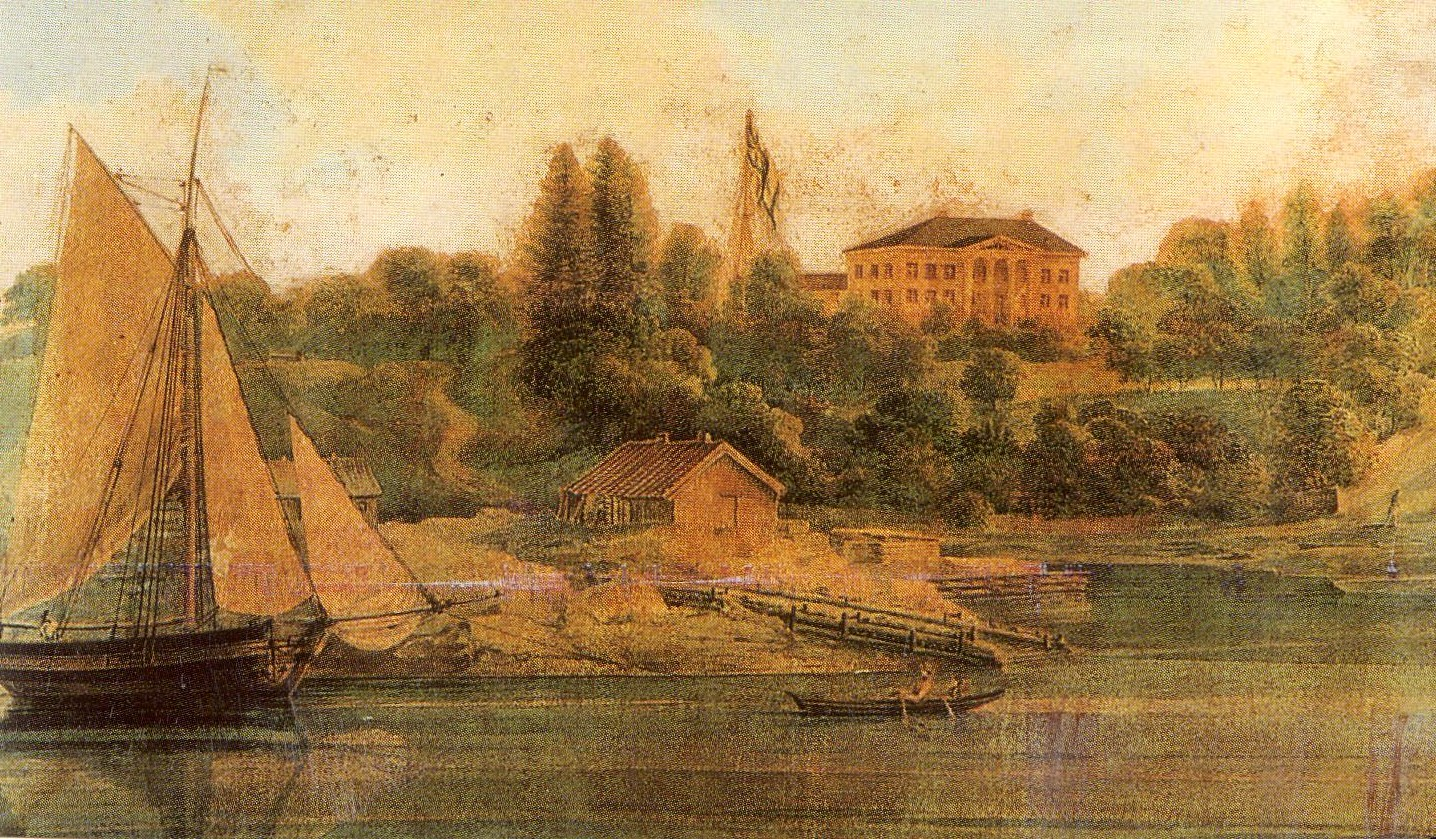
Gjemsø Kloster Manor, Skien (Solum)

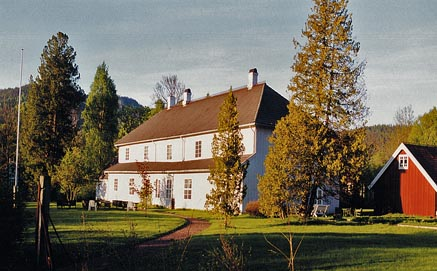
Eidsfoss Iron Works Manor

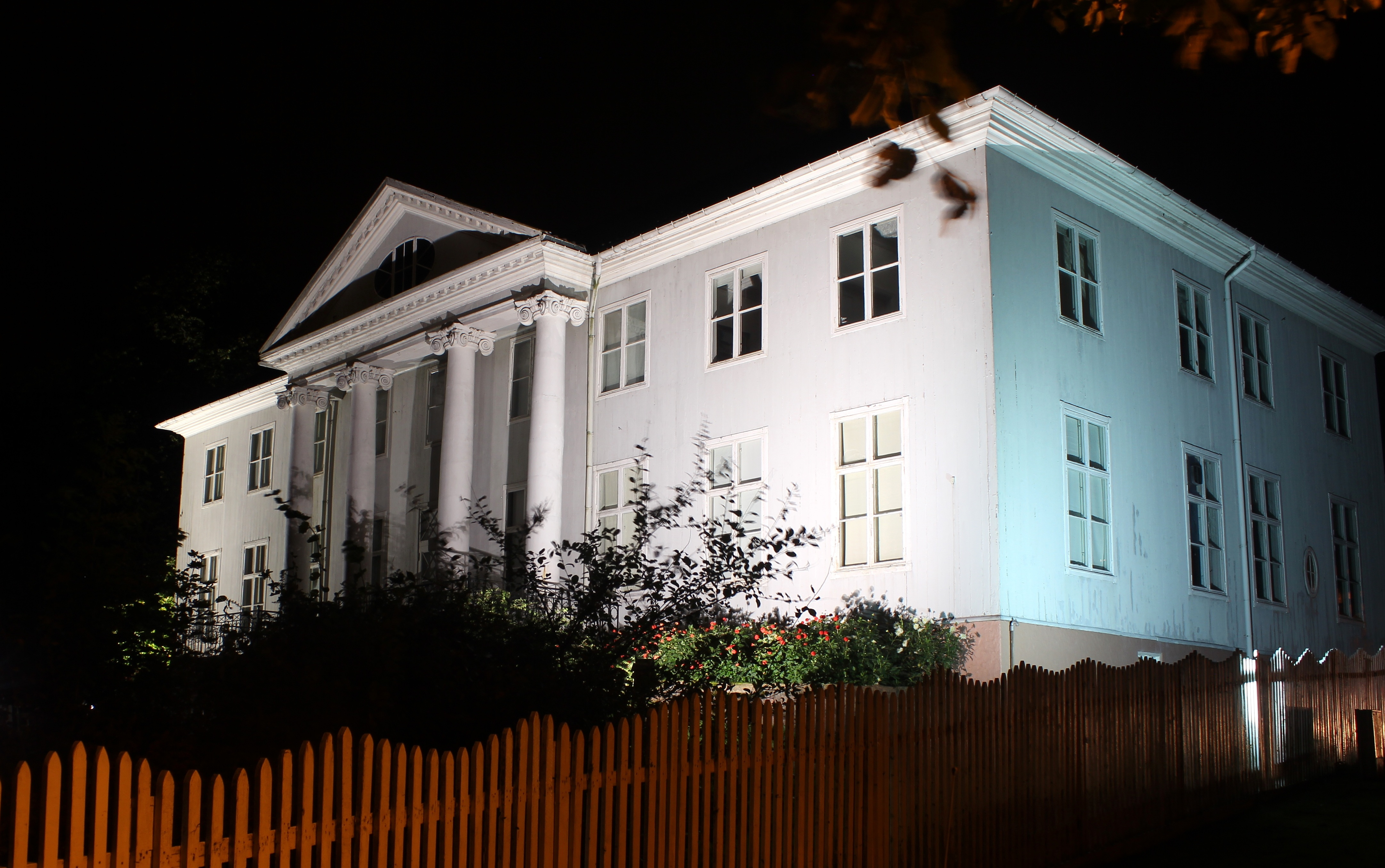
Austad Manor, Drammen

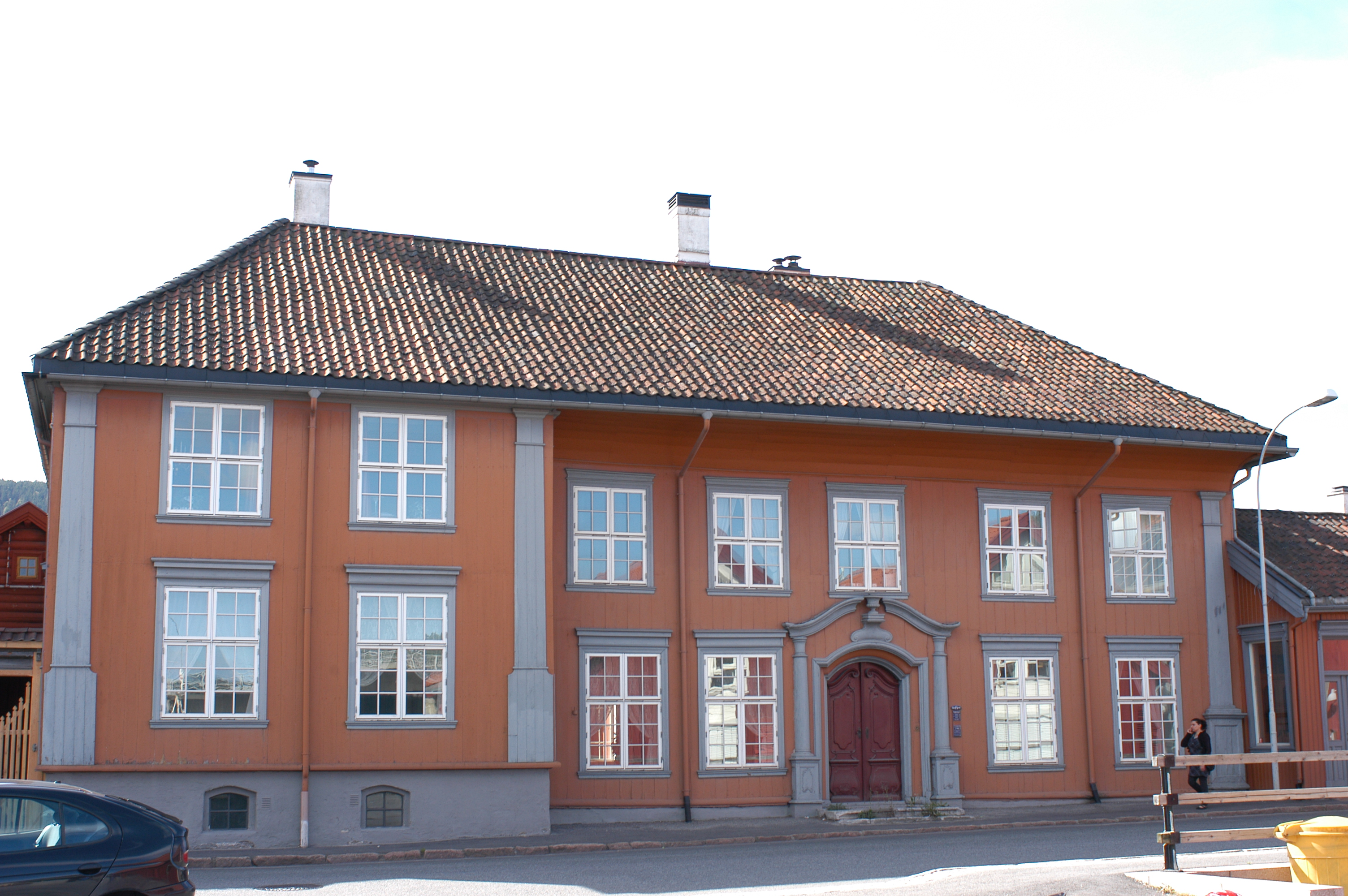
The Cappelen Townhouse in Drammen

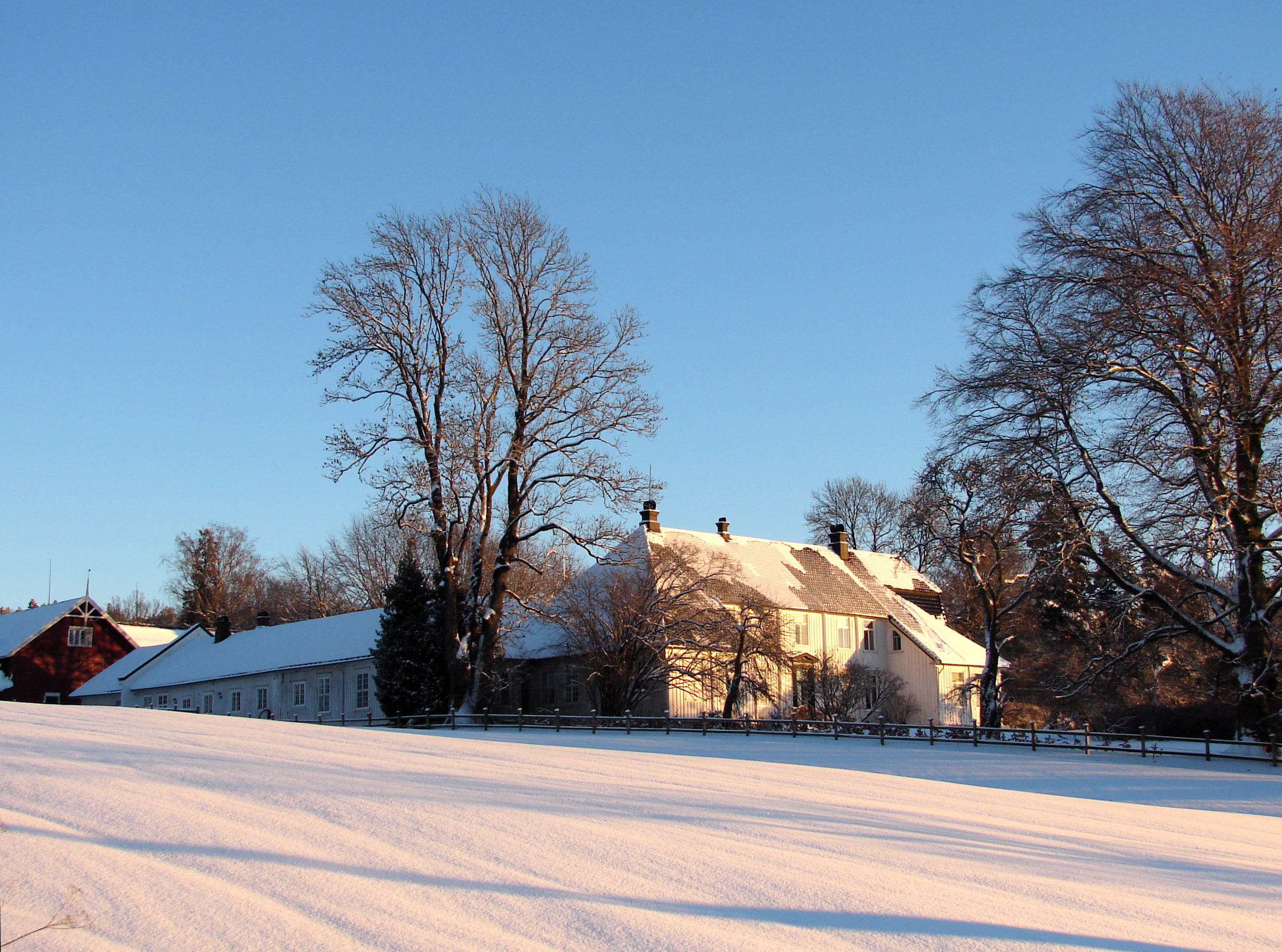
Borgestad Manor

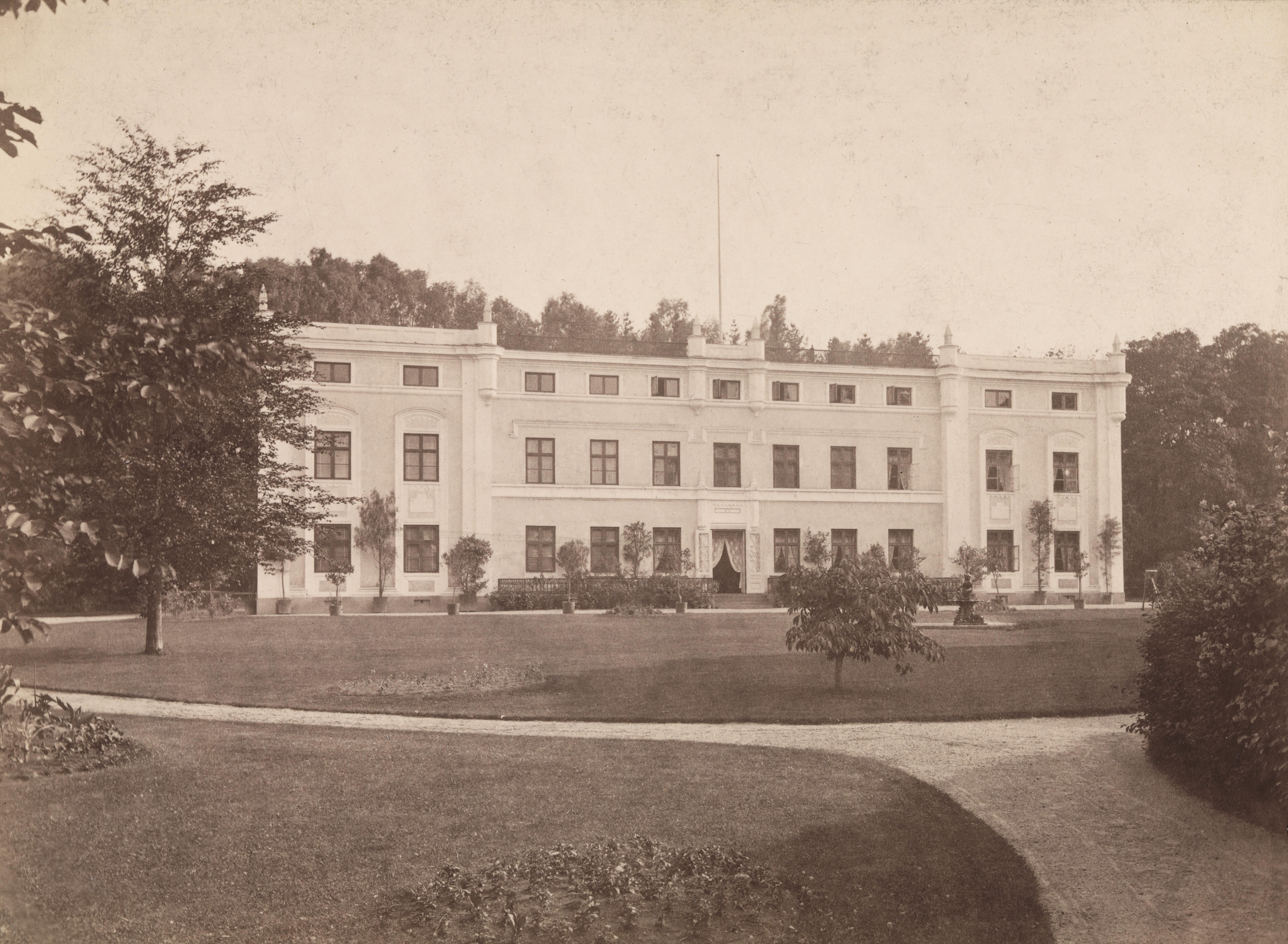
Holden Manor, Ulefoss

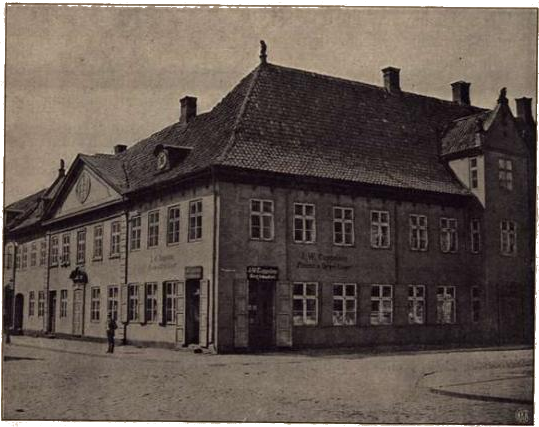
First office building of J.W. Cappelens Forlag

== Coat of arms ==
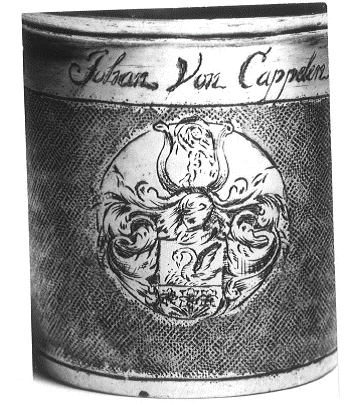
Silver cup with the family arms from Johan von Cappelen Junior (died 1698)

The family coat of arms were lawfully assumed in Norway in 1683: The shield is parted in two fields, the first and upper one having the mother pelican feeding its young with its own blood (a pelican in its piety), and the second field has three blooming roses with leaves and stems. On top of the shield is a helmet with a crest: two buffalo horns and between them the symbol of Fortune being a naked woman holding a ship's sail in her hands and standing on an orb.

The Ulefoss-line of the family has, however, dropped Fortune and uses the two horns only. The various lines of the family have different heraldic colours (tinctures) in the arms.

In Germany the family used a merchant's mark.

== Other sources ==
- Thomle, E. A. (1896) Familien (von) Cappelen i Norge og Danmark (Christiania: J.W. Cappelens Forlag)
- Haagen Krog Steffens (1911): Norske Slægter 1912, Gyldendalske Boghandel, Kristiania 1911
- Cappelen, Hans (1988) Familien Cappelens tyske opprinnelse. Noen antagelser og hypoteser (in Norsk Slektshistorisk Tidsskrift, Oslo, 31 (1988): 378–396)
- Haugen, Lambrecht (2008) Cappelen-slekten 1627–2008 (Rosendal)
