= Aall family =

Norwegian family originally from Jutland, Denmark

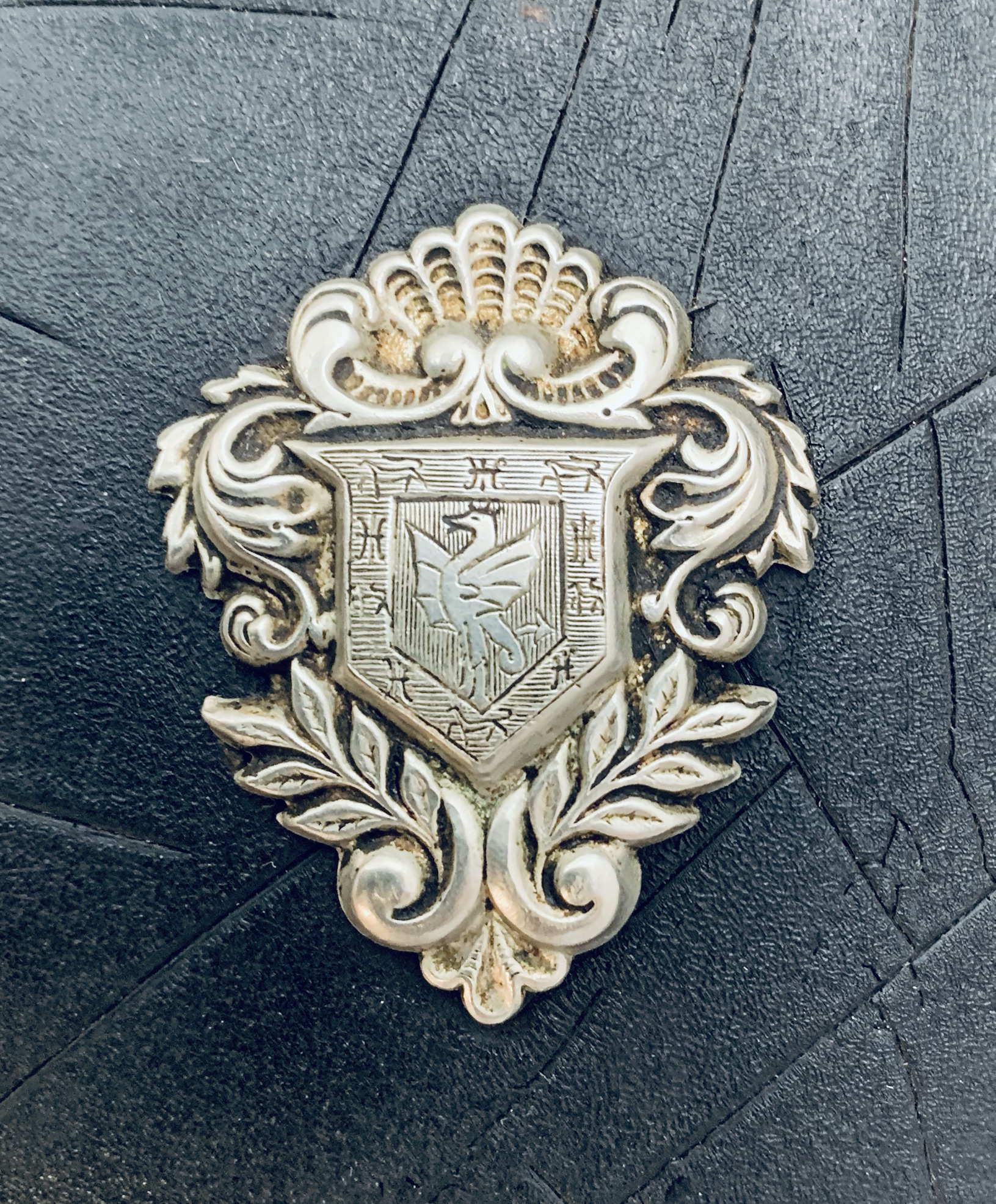
Coat of arms of the Aall family with a linden worm depicted on sealskin

Aall is a prominent Norwegian family, originally from Aal in Jutland (Denmark). The family's oldest known ancestor is Søren Nielsen, who was a peasant in Aal until 1534, when he lost his farm. The family immigrated to Norway in 1714 with Niels Aall the older, who became a merchant and ship-owner in Porsgrunn. The family was part of the Patriciate of Norway from the 18th century.

== Notable members ==
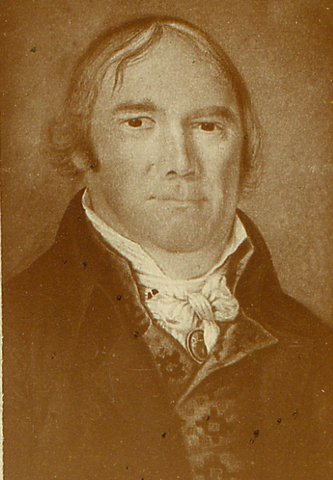
Jacob Aall

- Nicolai Benjamin Aall (1739–1798), merchant and shipowner
- Jørgen Aall (1771–1833), merchant and member of the Eidsvoll assembly
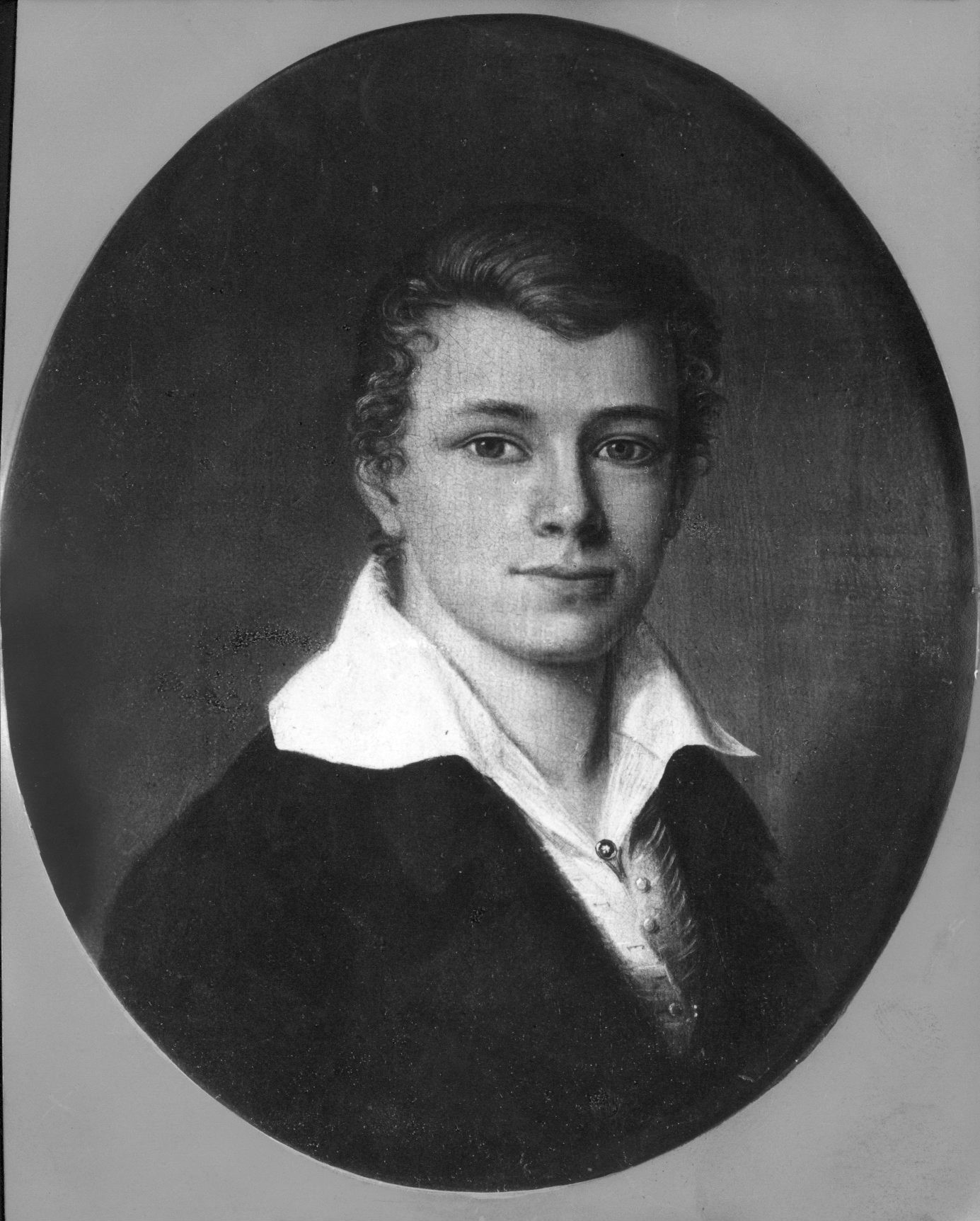
- Hans Aall
  Niels Aall (1769–1854), cabinet minister
- Jacob Aall (1773–1844), politician and historian
- Hans J. C. Aall, politician

== Literature ==
- Haagen Krog Steffens, Slægten Aall, Kristiania 1908, med senere tilleggsbind
- Hans Cappelen, Norske slektsvåpen (Norwegian Family Coats of Arms), Oslo 1969 (2. ed 1976), p. 51
- Herman Leopoldus Løvenskiold: «Heraldisk nøkkel», Oslo 1978
