= Jørgen Wright Cappelen =

Norwegian bookseller and publisher

Jørgen Wright Cappelen (10 August 1805 – 6 October 1878) was a Norwegian bookseller and publisher. He was one of the founders of the publishing house Cappelen Damm.

== Personal life ==
Jørgen Wright Cappelen was born at Porsgrund, Norway as the ninth and youngest child of ship-owner Ulrich Fredrich von Cappelen (1770–1820) and his wife Benedicte Henrikke, née Aall (1772–1812). His maternal grandfather was Nicolai Benjamin Aall, and as such his group of uncles included Constitutional founding fathers Niels Aall, Jacob Aall and Jørgen Aall. When Jørgen reached 15 years of age, he had lost both parents and the family business was bankrupt, however, his uncles Niels Aall (1769–1854) and Diderik von Cappelen (1761–1828) took over as trustees.

His oldest brothers Nicolai Benjamin Cappelen and Ulrik Frederik Cappelen became jurists and members of the national parliament. The third brother, Wittus Juel Cappelen, became a merchant in Drammen. The oldest sisters Didricha Cappelen (1794-1833) and Louise Cappelen (1811-1842) were married consecutively to bishop and politician Jens Lauritz Arup (1793–1874). The fourth sister Benedicte Cappelen (1804-1881) married their cousin Hans Blom Cappelen (1803-1846); from this marriage, Jørgen had a nephew Didrik Cappelen (1836–1914) who became a member of parliament and a niece Marie Cappelen (1832-1913) who married merchant Fritz Trampe Flood (1826–1913).

Jørgen Cappelen was married in 1842 to Danish stage actress and opera soprano Fredrikke Helene Schwirtz (1819-1870).

== Career ==
Jørgen Wright Cappelen started theological studies in Basel, but abandoned these. He instead moved to Kristiania and ran a bookstore on Storgata. In 1829, he and founded the publishing house J.W. Cappelens Forlag.The publications were largely centered on religious topics. In the second half of the nineteenth century, they rather concentrated on school books.

Cappelen was the first chairman of the Norwegian Booksellers Association, serving in that capacity from 1851 to 1870.

After his death the business was taken over by his son Jørgen Wright Cappelen, Jr. (1857-1934). The publishing house and bookshop was split into two stock companies in 1957. The bookshop company was liquidated in 1973. The publishing house still exists as Cappelen Damm following a merger with publisher N. W. Damm & Søn.

== See also ==
- Cappelen (family)
