= Sindre Guldvog =

Norwegian publisher (born 1955)

Sindre Guldvog (born 21 March 1955) is a Norwegian publisher.

He was born in Trondheim, and graduated as siv.øk. in 1977. From 1988 he was the CEO of the publishing house J.W. Cappelens Forlag, one of Norway's oldest. When Cappelen merged with Damm in 2007, Tom Harald Jenssen became the CEO of the new company Cappelen Damm. Guldvog was also chair of the Norwegian Publishers Association from 1996 to 1999.
