= Fritz Trampe Flood =

Norwegian merchant

- Born: January 13, 1826
- Died: May 10, 1913 (aged 87)

Fredrik "Fritz" Christoffer Trampe Flood (13 January 1826 – 10 May 1913) was a Norwegian merchant.

== Personal life ==
Fritz Trampe Flood was born in 1826 to merchant Jørgen Flood (1792–1867) and his wife Hanna (1796–1863), née Aall. As such his maternal grandfather was Constitutional founding father Jørgen Aall. He grew up in Eidanger.

He married Marie D. Cappelen, daughter of Hans and Benedicte Cappelen. Of their four children, two boys and three girls, their oldest son Hans Flood became director of Bergens Mekaniske Verksted.

Through his wife, Fritz was connected to the influential Cappelen family. Fritz' father-in-law Hans was the son of Constitutional founding father Didrich von Cappelen, his mother-in-law Benedicte was the daughter of ship-owner Ulrich Fredrich von Cappelen and sister of Ulrik Frederik Cappelen, Nicolai Benjamin Cappelen and Jørgen Wright Cappelen (who founded the publishing house Cappelen), and his brother-in-law was parliament member Didrik Cappelen. Fritz and Marie both died in 1913.

== Career ==
He started his career as a trainee in the merchant company J. & E. M. Flood, which was run by his father Jørgen and uncle Elias, One of their outlets, the so-called Floodebutik (Flood shop) was "visited by the most distinguished public of the Skiensfjorden", according to one historian. Fritz Trampe Flood also co-managed Bolvig iron works with his brother Niels Weyer Aall Flood. They had inherited the iron works from their father, who bought it in 1841. Towards the end of his career he ran a broker's business and a firm of agents.

Another of his brothers, Jørgen Aall Flood, became a noted public figure as mayor of Porsgrund municipality.
