= Nicolai Benjamin Aall =

Norwegian businessman, ship-owner, property owner and timber merchant

Nicolai Benjamin Aall (1739–1798) was a Norwegian businessman, ship-owner, property owner and timber merchant.

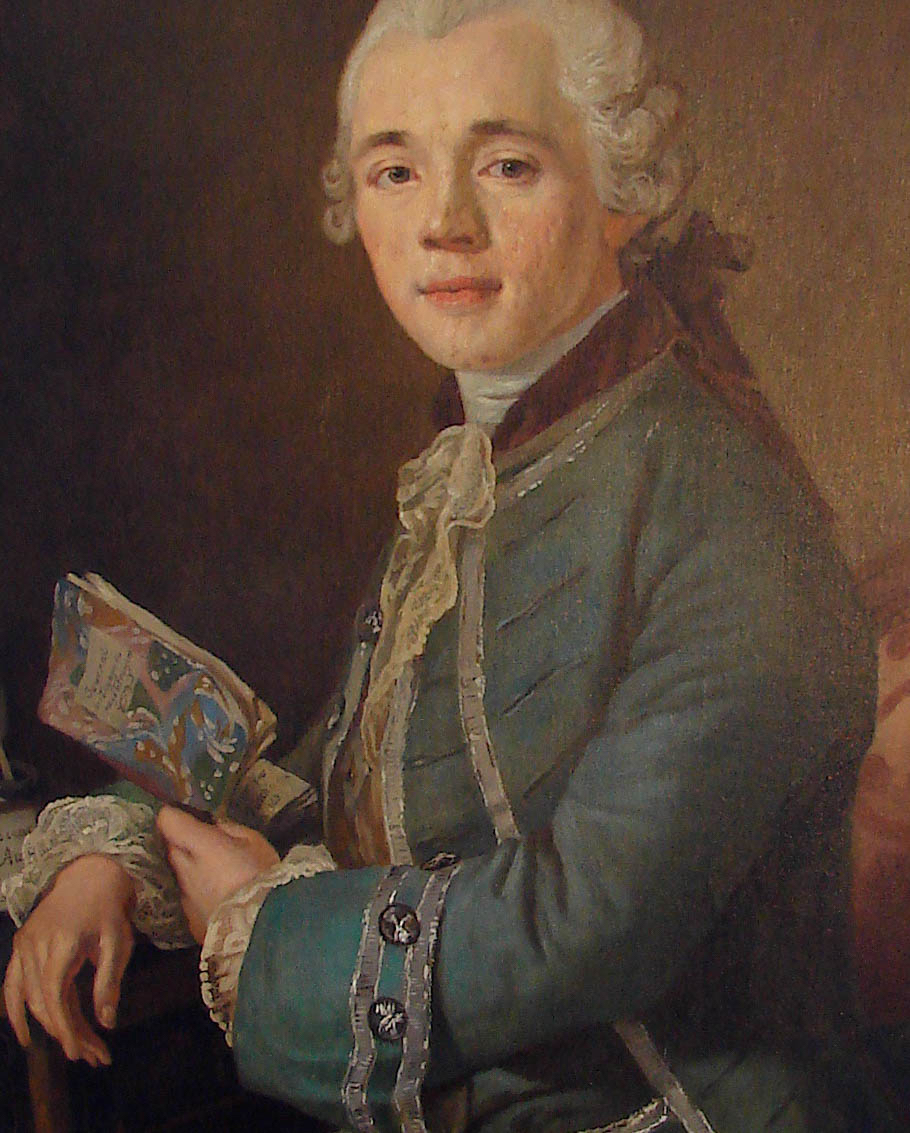
Nicolai Benjamin Aall

== Background ==
Nicolai Benjamin Aall was born at Porsgrund, Norway, the first son of Niels Jacobsen Aall (1702–1784) and Benedicte Henrikke Bergh (1714–1748). Niels Jacobsen Aall was a lumber merchant and shipowner who had been born in London. He moved to Porsgrund in 1712. Benedicte Henrikke was from Moss and was the second of three wives. At nine years old Nicolai Benjamin lost his mother, but five years later his father married Fredrikke Sophie Rasch (1726–1760).

Nicolai Benjamin's younger half-brother Jacob Aall (1754–1826) became a noted wholesaler, whereas his youngest half-sister Benedicta Henrikka Aall (1756–1813) married Severin Løvenskiold (1743–1818). Their son, Severin Løvenskiold (1777–1856) was his nephew.

== Career ==
Aall graduated from the University of Copenhagen and took examination as a theologian in 1759, but later turned to work in his father's business. He acquired burghership as a merchant in 1772. In 1777, he took over two sawmills in Skien and forested property near the border of Telemark. In 1782 he purchased the entire work with associated properties. In 1796 he and Diderik von Cappelen, brother of his son-in-law Ulrich Fredrich von Cappelen, established a rope factory (Reperbane) at Vestre Porsgrunn to meet the needs of the shipbuilding industry.

In the same year he was registered as the owner of eleven ships, having coped through the American Revolutionary War which had a negative impact on business. He was described as hard-working and self-sacrificing, and handled his business with "superior proficiency", according to one historian.

== Personal life ==
In 1758, he married Amborg Jørgensdatter Wesseltoft (1741–1815) from Skien, inheritor of the wealthy merchant Jørgen Simonsen Wesseltoft (d. 1760). They had four sons; Nicolai Benjamin Jr. (1776–1811), Niels Aall (1769–1854), Jørgen Aall (1771–1833), Jacob Aall (1773–1844), and three daughters Benedicta Henrikka Aall (1772–1812), Inger Aall (1774–1856) and Constance Aall (1778–1842).

Benedicte Henricka married Ulrich Fredrich von Cappelen (1770–1820) of the influential Cappelen family, and Inger married Hans Eleonardus Møller Sr. Through these marriages Nicolai Benjamin Aall was the grandfather of later parliament member Hans Eleonardus Møller, political figures Ulrik Frederik Cappelen and Nicolai Benjamin Cappelen and publishing house founder Jørgen Wright Cappelen.

He died at Aallgården in Porsgrund, His wife survived him by 17 years. They are both buried in the cemetery at Østre Porsgrunn Church.
