= Nicolai Benjamin Cappelen =

Norwegian jurist and politician (1795–1866)

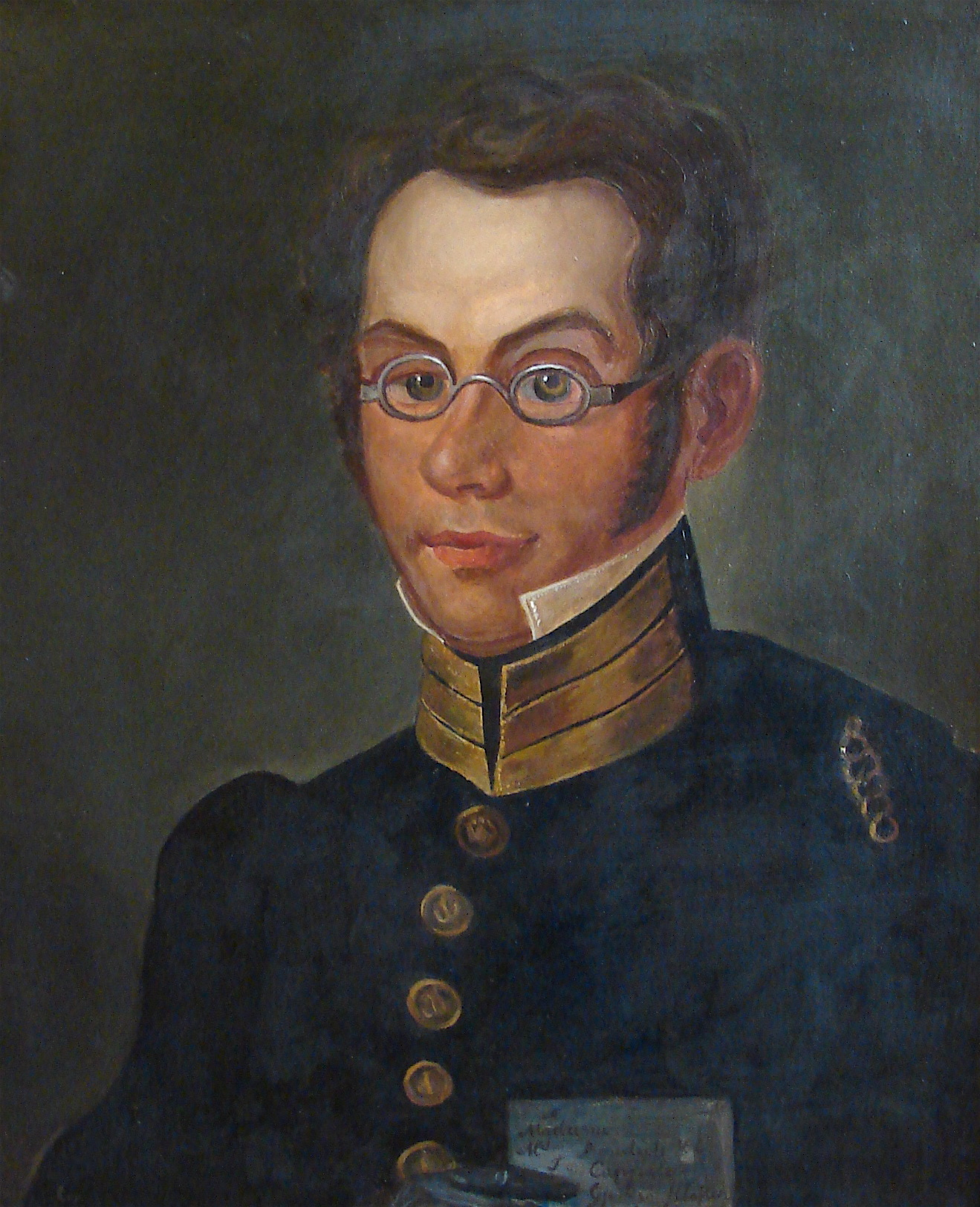
Nicolai Benjamin Cappelen

Nicolai Benjamin Cappelen (1795–1866) was a Norwegian jurist and politician.

== Personal life ==
Nicolai Benjamin Cappelen was the first child of Ulrich Fredrich von Cappelen (1770–1820) and his wife Benedicte Henrikke, née Aall (1772–1812). His namesake and maternal grandfather was Nicolai Benjamin Aall. As such his group of uncles included Constitutional founding fathers Severin Løvenskiold, Jacob and Jørgen Aall and their brother, cabinet minister Niels Aall. Also his father's brother Didrich von Cappelen was one of the Constitutional founding fathers in 1814.

Nicolai Benjamin's younger brother Ulrik Frederik Cappelen too became a jurist and member of the national parliament. The second brother, Wittus Juel, became a merchant in Drammen. The oldest sisters Didricha and Louise were married consecutively to bishop and politician Jens Lauritz Arup. The fourth sister Benedicte married their cousin Hans Blom Cappelen; from this marriage, Jørgen got a nephew Didrik who became a member of parliament, and a niece Marie who married Fritz Trampe Flood of the notable Flood ship-owner family. His third and youngest brother Jørgen Wright Cappelen became a book publisher.

Cappelen did never marry, and had no children. He left parts of his great book collection to the Skien school library and parts to his cousin Erik Johan Cappelen of Borgestad Manor, who was his assistant for a period.

== Career ==
Nicolai Benjamin Cappelen was born in Skien, but the family moved to Porsgrund in 1805. He later moved to study law, but returned to Skien after his graduation as cand.jur. in 1817. His father had been a ship-owner, but by 1820 the business was bankrupt. Nicolai Benjamin Cappelen instead worked as a civil servant. He served as stipendiary magistrate (byfogd) in Skien and Porsgrund, who shared administration, from 1831 to 1847. That year he was succeeded by Christian Cornelius Paus, and instead went on to become district judge (sorenskriver) in Bamble Municipality. He resided in Skien at the time.

As a politician Nicolai Benjamin Cappelen was elected member of the Norwegian Parliament in 1839, representing the constituency of Skien og Porsgrund. He was not re-elected.
