= Fredrikke Helene Schwirtz =

Norwegian-Danish stage actress and opera soprano

Fredrikke Helene Schwirtz (15 May 1819 – 9 Jan 1870) was a Norwegian-Danish stage actress and opera soprano.

She was from Copenhagen, Denmark. She was the daughter of Johan Ludvig Schwirtz and Anne Margrethe Amment. She was engaged at the Christiania Theatre in Christiania (now Oslo) Norway from 1839–42, where she made her debut as Susanna in The Marriage of Figaro. She had a short but very successful career in Norway and obtained immense popularity with her lively acting and her versatile soprano. She retired from the stage after her marriage in 1842 to the book publisher Jørgen Wright Cappelen (1805–1878).

== Other sources ==
- Tharald Høyerup: Blanc, Christiania theaters historie 1827-1877, J.W. Cappelen Christiania
