= Jørgen Aall =

Norwegian ship-owner and politician

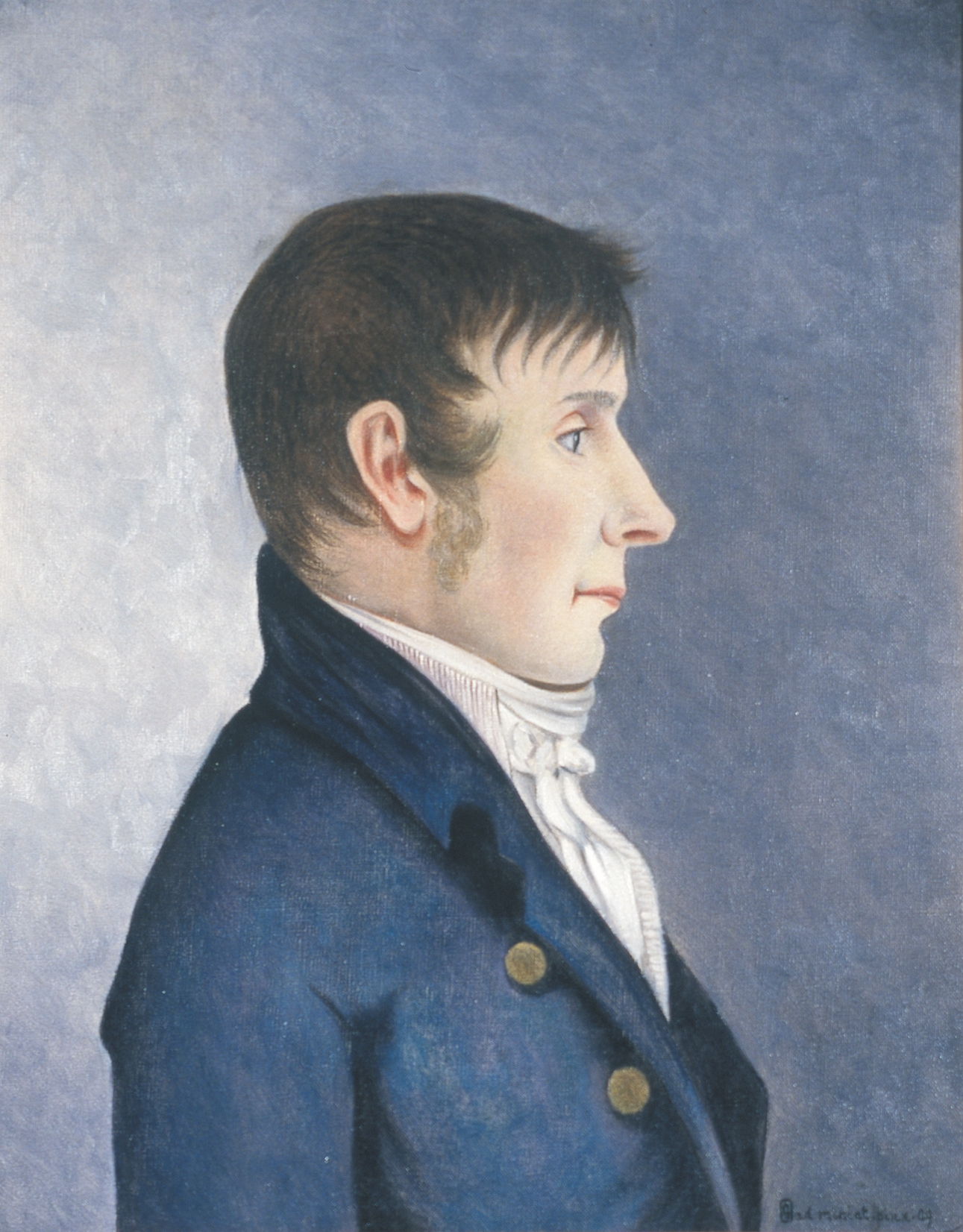

Norwegian Constitutional Assembly
- In office 1814–1814

Member of Parliament
- In office 1815–1816

Personal details
- Born: 22 February 1771
- Died: 7 April 1833 (aged 62)
- Party: Independent
- Profession: Merchant, shipbuilder and ship-owner

Jørgen Aall (22 February 1771 – 7 April 1833) was a Norwegian ship-owner and politician.

== Personal life ==
Jørgen Aall was born in 1771 as the second son of Nicolai Benjamin Aall (1739–1798) and Amborg Jørgensdatter (1741–1815), née Wesseltoft. He had three brothers and three sisters. His brothers Niels and Jacob held high positions in politics, whereas his sister Benedicte Henricka married Ulrich Fredrich von Cappelen of the influential Cappelen family, and another sister Inger married Hans Eleonardus Møller, Sr. His nephews included later parliament member Hans Eleonardus Møller, political figures Ulrik Frederik Cappelen and Nicolai Benjamin Cappelen and publishing house founder Jørgen Wright Cappelen.

He married Birgitte Gurine Weyer (1770–1819) from Strømsø, daughter of counsellor of war Hans Thomas Weyer, in December 1793. They had six children, five daughters and one son. Of the daughters, Hanna Thomine and Constance respectively married the brothers Jørgen and Paulus Flood, both of whom served as mayors in the city.

== Career ==
Jørgen Aall was elected to the Norwegian Constitutional Assembly, that drafted the Constitution of Norway in 1814. He later sat in the Norwegian Parliament from 1815 to 1816, representing the constituency of Skien og Porsgrund. This was noteworthy as the city Skien, compared to Aall's native Porsgrund, had twice as many electors. For his political role, his headstone on Østsiden cemetery was, together with that of fellow Constitutional father Jens Schow Fabricius, regularly garlanded on Norwegian Constitution Day.

As a businessman, Jørgen Aall combined grain and timber merchantry with shipbuilding; in addition he was a ship-owner. In 1805 he owned eight ships. He was also consul for France. Jørgen Aall started in his father's company, but set up an independent business in 1796. Much of his wealth was actually inherited from his father, who died two years later. However, the Napoleonic Wars and their aftermath had a negative impact on the business. He was also troubled by fires. Aall was eventually forced to file for bankruptcy in 1818.
