= Ulrik Frederik Cappelen =

Norwegian jurist and politician (1797–1864)

Governor of Finnmarkens amt
- In office 1829–1833

Member of Parliament
- In office 1833–1833

County Governor of Jarlsbergs og Laurvigs amt
- In office 1833–1864

Member of Parliament
- In office 1845–1845

Personal details
- Born: 13 May 1797
- Died: 24 November 1864 (aged 67)
- Party: Independent
- Spouse: Anne Helene Øwre Aagaard
- Relations: Nicolai Benjamin Aall (grandfather), Ulrich Fredrich von Cappelen (father); Nicolai Benjamin Cappelen (brother); Jørgen Wright Cappelen (brother); Jens Lauritz Arup (brother-in-law); Niels Aall (uncle); Jacob Aall (uncle); Jørgen Aall (uncle)
- Profession: Jurist

Ulrik Frederik Cappelen (13 May 1797 – 24 November 1864) was a Norwegian jurist and politician.

== Personal life ==
Ulrik Frederik Cappelen was born in 1795 as the second child of ship-owner Ulrich Fredrich von Cappelen (1770–1820) and his wife Benedicte Henrikke, née Aall (1772–1812). His maternal grandfather was Nicolai Benjamin Aall. As such his group of uncles included Constitutional founding fathers Niels, Jacob and Jørgen Aall.

His older brother Nicolai Benjamin too became a jurist and member of the national parliament. The younger brother, Wittus Juel, became a merchant in Drammen. The oldest sisters Didricha and Louise were married consecutively to bishop and politician Jens Lauritz Arup. The fourth sister Benedicte married their cousin Hans Blom Cappelen; from this marriage, Jørgen got a nephew Didrik who became a member of parliament, and a niece Marie who married Fritz Trampe Flood of the notable Flood ship-owner family. His third and youngest brother Jørgen Wright Cappelen became a book publisher.

In 1831 Ulrik Frederik Cappelen married Anne Helene Øwre Aagaard. She was the daughter of a merchant in Hammerfest.

== Career ==
Ulrik Frederik Cappelen was born in Skien, but the family moved to Porsgrund in 1805. His father had been a shipowner, but by 1820 the business was bankrupt. Ulrik Frederik Cappelen instead started a career as a civil servant, like his older brother Nicolai Benjamin. He studied at the University of Copenhagen, and graduated with a cand.jur. degree from the University of Christiania in 1817.

He then held various positions before becoming district stipendiary magistrate (sorenskriver) in Western Finnmark in 1825. In 1829 he was promoted to County Governor of Finnmark. While stationed here he was elected to the Norwegian Parliament in 1833, representing the constituency of Finmarkens Amt. However, in July the same year he was appointed County Governor of Jarlsberg og Laurvigs amt (today named Vestfold). While being County Governor seated in the city of Laurvik, he was elected for a second time to the Norwegian Parliament, in 1845. He represented the constituency of Laurvik og Sandefjord. He retired as County Governor in September 1864, and died later that year.

Government offices
Preceded by Christian Ulrik Kastrup	County Governor of Finnmarkens amt 1829–1833	Succeeded by Ole Edvard Buck
Preceded by Johan Henrik Rye	County Governor of Jarlsbergs og Laurvigs amt 1833–1864	Succeeded by Johan Hvoslef
