= Johan Zeier Cappelen =

Norwegian jurist and ambassador

Johan Zeier Cappelen (18 December 1913 – 16 September 2007) was a Norwegian jurist and ambassador.

He was born in Vang Municipality in Hedmark, as a son of Hans Blom Cappelen (1879–1965) and a brother of Andreas Zeier Cappelen. The brothers were members of Mot Dag in the 1930s.

He served as Norwegian ambassador to Brazil from 1960 to 1962, Iceland from 1962 to 1965 and Yugoslavia from 1970. In the latter post he also had ambassador credentials to Bulgaria and from 1971 to Albania. He was a board member of Norsk Utviklingshjelp, a predecessor of Norad, from 1965 to 1969. He was decorated Commander of the Order of St. Olav in 1972, and with the Grand Cross of the Icelandic Order of the Falcon.
