= Haagen Krog Steffens =

Norwegian historian, archivist and genealogist

Haagen Krog Steffens (30 April 1873 – 9 May 1917) was a Norwegian historian, archivist and genealogist.

Haagen Krog Steffens was born in Christiania (now Oslo), Norway. He was the son of physician Henrich Steffens (1841-1984) and Asta Falch. Steffens belonged to a family originating in Holstein. Both his father and grandfather were doctors and his family fostered a number of prominent individuals. Steffens attended Christiania Cathedral School (now Oslo Cathedral School). Steffens graduated with a Candidate of Law degree in 1897. Later he undertook a series of studies at archives in Sweden, Denmark, Germany and Belgium. He was hired was an archivist in the National Archival Services of Norway and had a decisive influence on the archive system.

His most important works were Norske slægter, released in two volumes in 1912 and 1915; Den norske Centraladministrasjons Historie 1814-1914, released in 1914; and Kragerø bys historie, released in 1916. He was a published in both Morgenbladet and Aftenposten.

He is best known as a very diligent genealogist. He wrote genealogies of several families, including the Mogensen, Mathiesen, Rod and Aall families.

He died in Oslo and was buried at Vår Frelsers gravlund.

== Selected works ==
- Hvitebjørn og Stubljan – En norsk Gaards og Slægts Historie (1898)
- Linderud og slegterne Mogensen og Mathiesen (1899)
- Selvig i Hurum – Et stykke norsk Gaards og Slægts Historie (1902)
- Slegten Wiel (1903)
- Herrebø Fayancefabrik og dens grundlægger Peter Hofnagel (1904)
- Slegten Stang – Bidrag til Fredrikshalds Historie (1905)
- Fru Emerentze Munch, f. Barclays Optegnelser (1907)
- Slegten Aall (1908)
- Fru Conradine Dunkers Erindringer (1909)
- Norske Slægter 1912 (1912)
- Den Norske Centraladministrations Historie 1814–1914 (1914)
- Norske Slægter 1915 (1915)
- Kragerø Bys Historie 1666–1916 (1916)
