= Niels Aall =

Norwegian politician

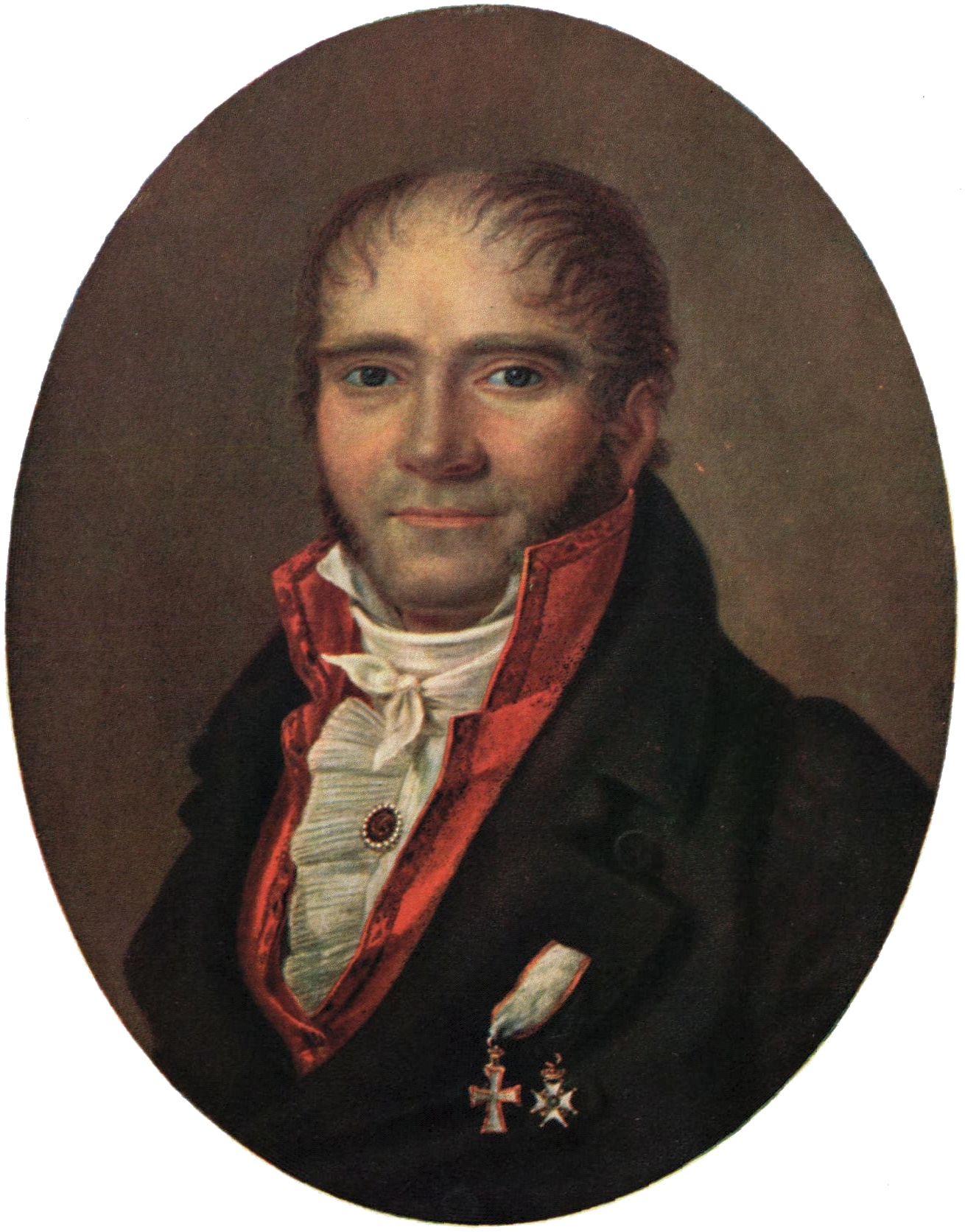
Niels Aall by Jacob Munch

Niels Aall (1 December 1769 – 23 October 1854) was a Norwegian estate owner, businessman and politician.

== Family ==
Niels Aall was the son of lumber merchant Nicolai Benjamin Aall (1739–98) from Porsgrunn and his wife Amjørg Jørgensdatter Wesseltoft (1741-1815). He was the brother of Jacob and Jørgen Aall. Aall was married twice, first from 1794 to Mariane Møller until she died in 1796, then from 1804 to Christine Johanne Blom until he died in 1854.

== Biography ==
After education in France and England, Aall settled as a merchant in Porsgunn. From 1810 he was the county clerk in Skien and Porsgrunn, before being appointed to Christian Frederik's government, where he was minister of trade and customs. He was one of the two Norwegian negotiators, alongside Jonas Collett during the Convention of Moss where the Swedish king and the Norwegian government signed a ceasefire agreement following the short war between the two countries. Niels Aall was one of Norway's leading politicians in 1814.

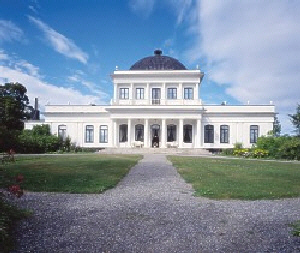
Ulefos Hovedgaard

== Ulefos Manor ==
Ulefos Manor (Ulefos Hovedgaard) was built by Niels Aall at the Næs Ironworks in Tvedestrand as the summer residence for his family. The house was completed in 1807 after a construction period of approximately 5 years. The architect was Christian Ancher Collett in collaboration with Jørgen Henrik Rawert (1751-1823). Ulefos Manor is an Empire-style manor house built of slag stones which were taken from Ulefos Jærnverk. Niels Aall later developed financial problems and in 1840 Ulefos Manor was sold at public auction. His son chamberlain Hans Aall (1805-1863) bought the manor and estates with funds inherited by his wife, Marianne Didrikke von Cappelen (1804-1867), daughter of Diderik von Cappelen who died in 1828. Their descendants still own the surrounding forest properties, while the manor was turned over to a foundation. Today Ulefos Manor is a museum.
