= Næs jernverk =

Iron works in Norway (1665–1959)

Coordinates: 58°37′41″N 8°51′17″E

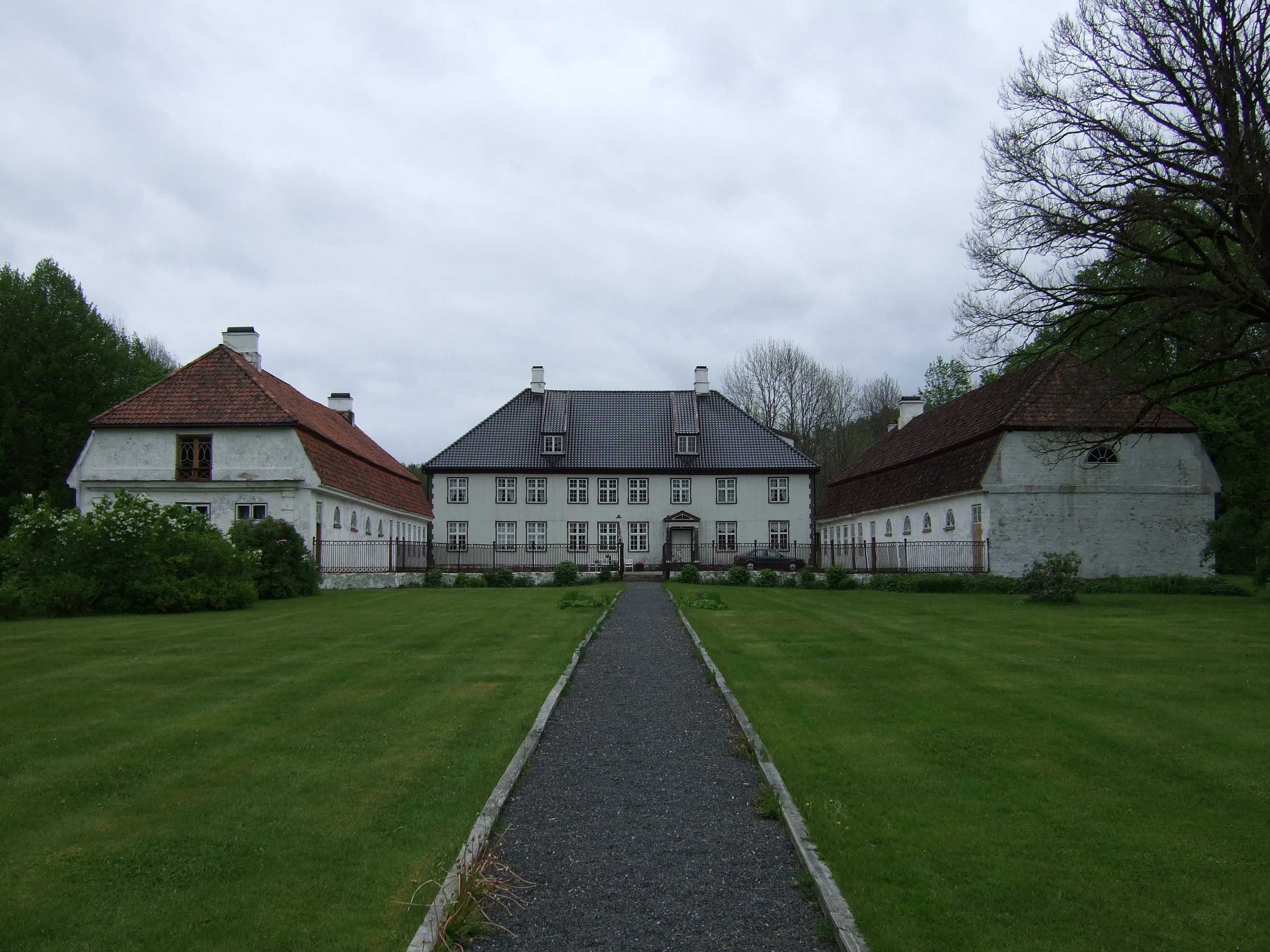
Næs ironworks, main building

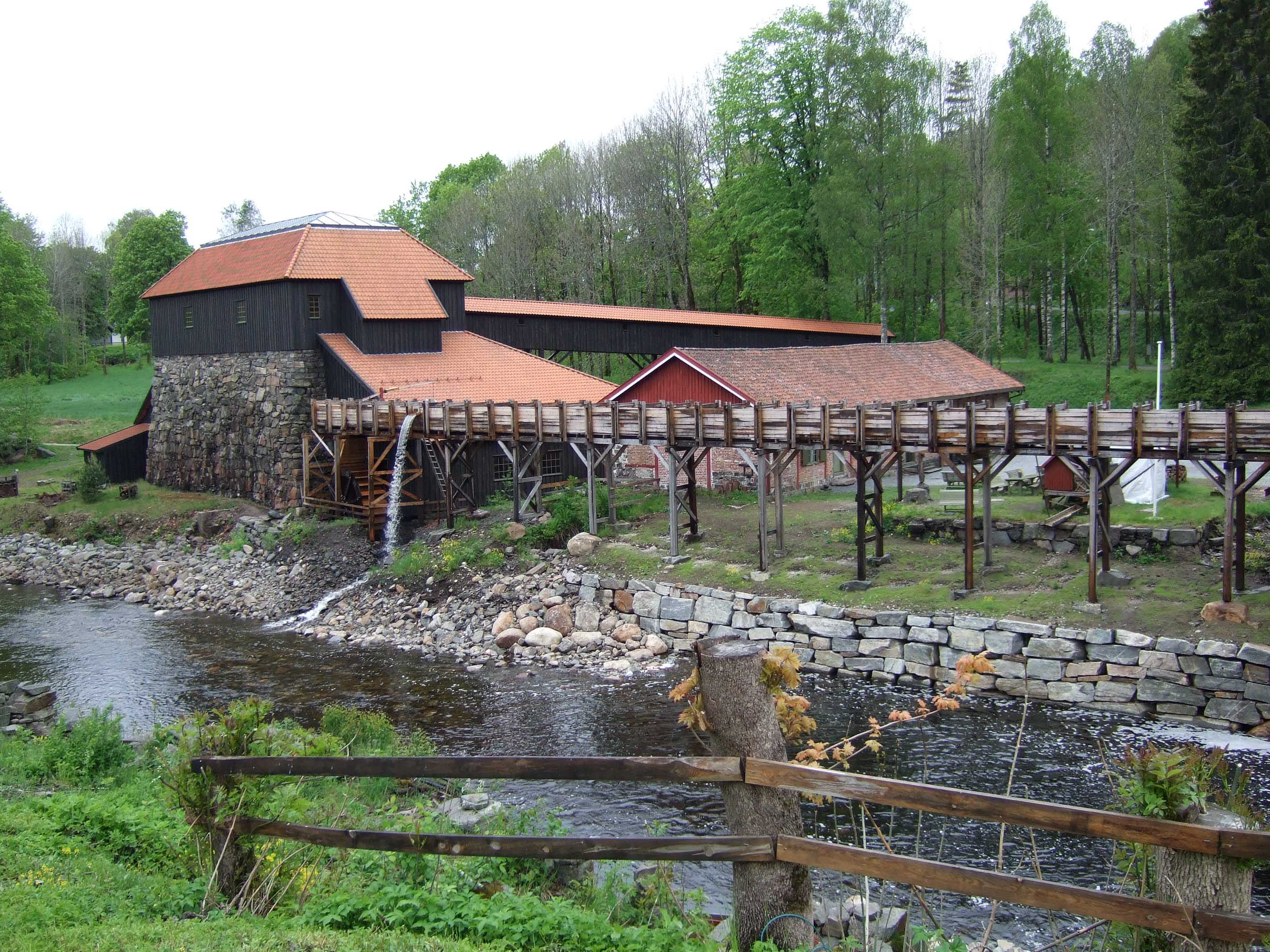
Næs ironworks, restored furnace building with waterwheel

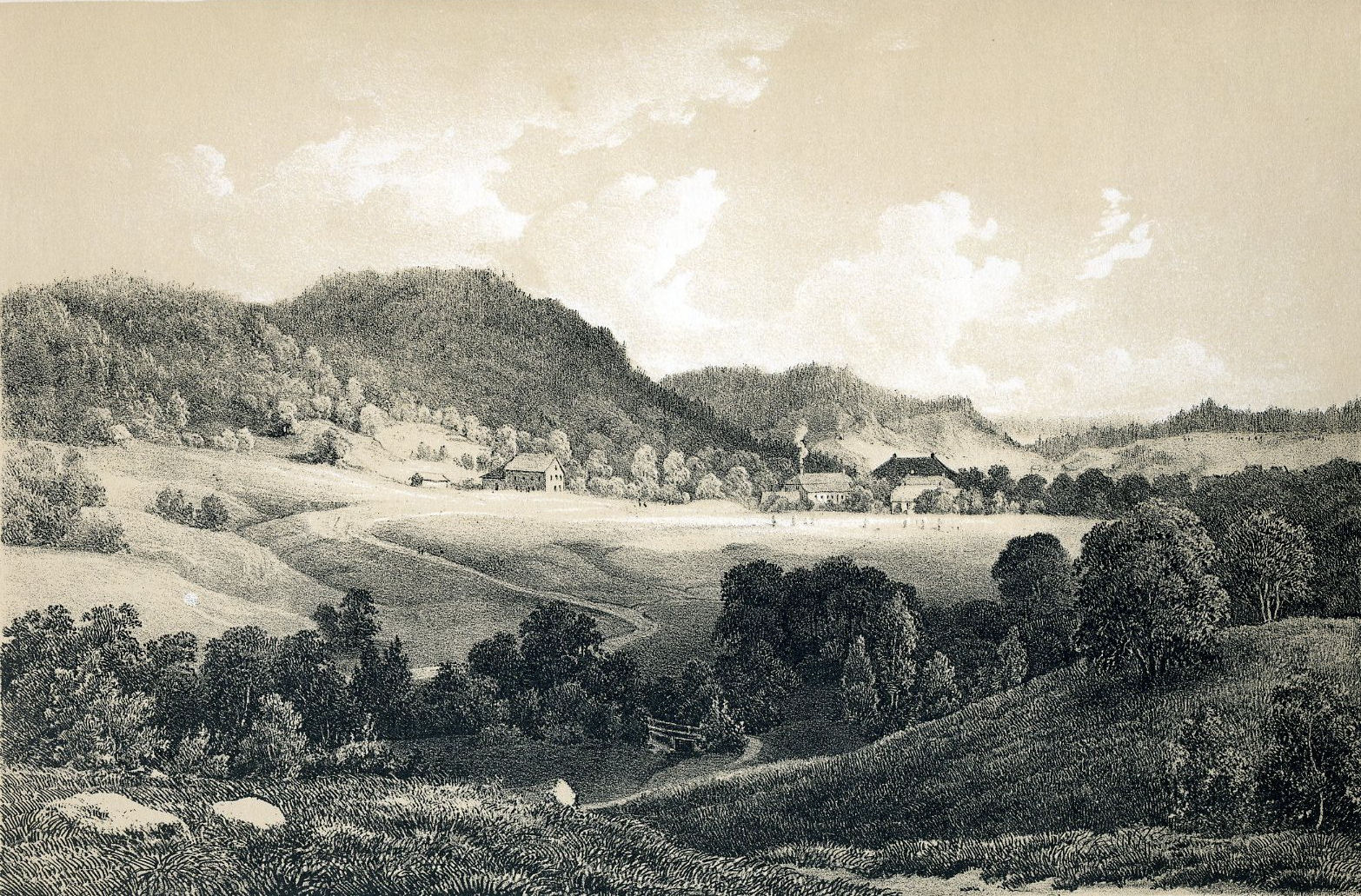
Næs ironworks in 1848. From Norway portrayed in drawings by Christian Tønsberg.

Næs Ironworks (Norwegian: Næs Jernverk or Næs verk) in Holt (now part of Tvedestrand Municipality, in Agder county, Norway), was an iron works which started operation in 1665 under the name “Baaseland Værk”. The blast furnace and foundry were located at the Båsland farm, while the associated forge was located about 1 kilometre (0.62 mi) further east, by the Storelva river at Næs. The blast furnace was new, and not an extension of the Barbu jernverk at Arendal which ceased operations in the 1650s. “Baaseland Værk” was given the name Naes blast furnace operation when the buildings were concentrated by Storelva in 1738. About 1840 the firm was renamed Jacob Aall & Søn. It ceased operation in 1959.

== History ==
While Ulrich Schnell was the sole owner of Baaselands Værk, he decided to relocate the blast furnace to the Storelva to take advantage of the water power available. In 1738 operations were centralized in Naes, and the name of the operation was changed to Næs Jernverk. Meanwhile, a new dam to power the hammers was built in Storelva. Infrastructure was included; for example in 1740 a permanent school building was constructed. During the decades of the 1750s and 1760s favorable economic conditions allowed Schnell to expand the business to a significant undertaking. Tvedestrand harbor was the center for shipping the products. The iron ore came was supplied from Arendal, from the Lyngroth mines in Froland and Solberg mine in Holt. The smelter used charcoal for fuel, and farmers in the surrounding district (Holt, Vegaarshei, Aamli) were required to burn timber to charcoal and deliver the charcoal to the iron works.

In 1799 Jacob Aall bought the Næs Ironworks for 170,000 Norwegian rigsdalers. He both improved and expanded the Næs Ironworks such that it became arguably the country's best-operated blast furnaces, known form both its well-constructed furnaces and for its foundry products. During the war with England from 1807 to 1814 Aall made a special effort to import wheat from Denmark for the people of the parish who supported the Næs Ironworks.

In 1820 the iron works had its own savings bank, as well as health and social security systems for its employees. The work also had approximately 70 smallholdings (small farms) that workers stayed on and operated. In 1830 the blast furnace complex was doubled in capacity, allowing the casting of larger items. In 1837 this capability was directed at construction of the 19-meter-long (62 ft) cast-iron bridge at Fosstveit, a few kilometers further down the Storelva. This Fosstvedt bridge was proposed for protection in 2002 as part of the Norwegian national protection plan for roads, bridges and related heritage constructions. The Norwegian Directorate for Cultural Heritage formally declared the bridge protected under the Cultural Heritage Act in 2008. The iron work also produced a statue of Christian Krohg, the nation's first public monument of cast iron, which was unveiled in Christiania on 17 May 1833. In 1840 Aalls son Benjamin Nicolay became an active member of the firm and the firm's name was changed to "Jacob Aall & Son."

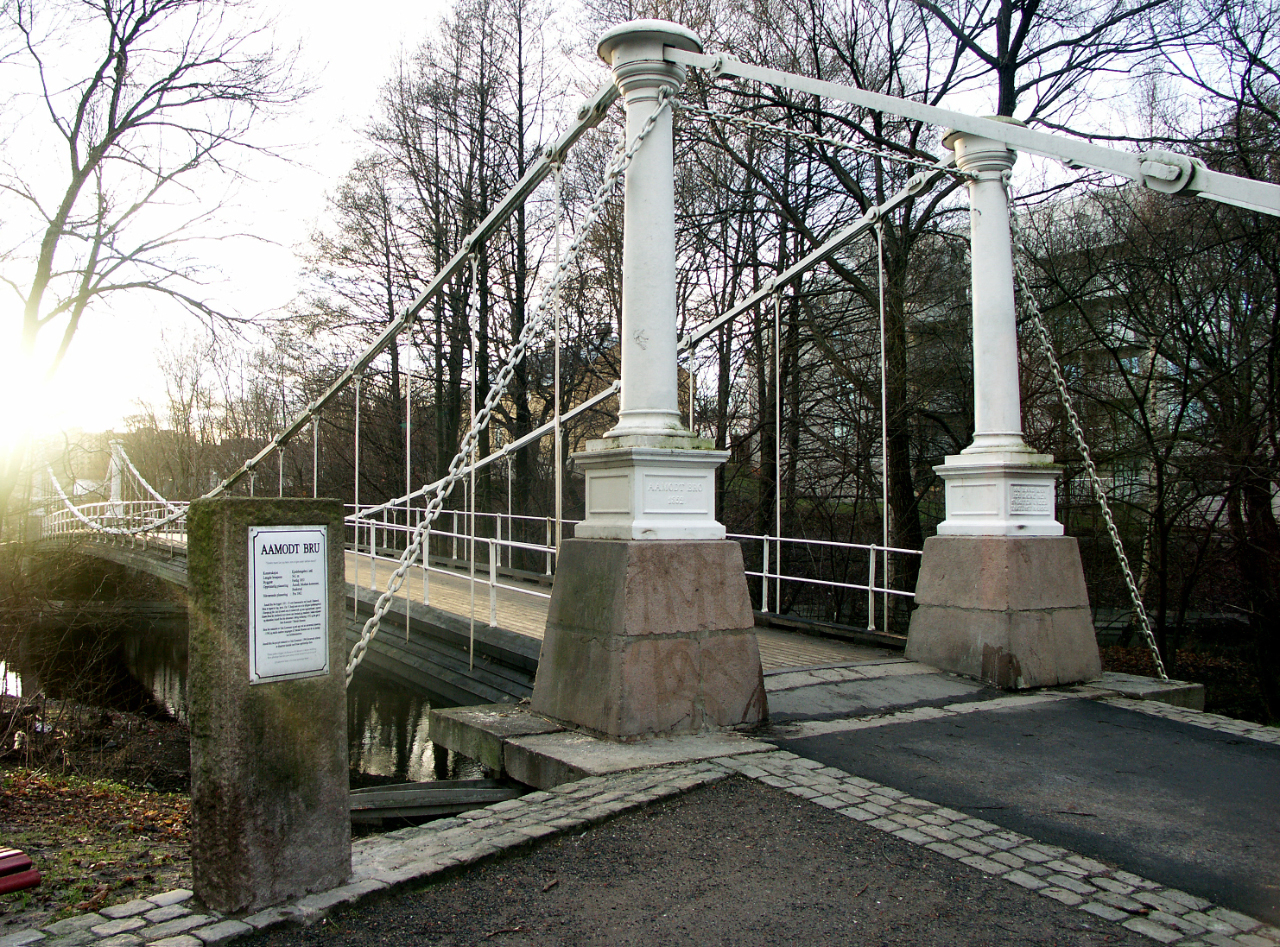
Åmotbrua is a cast-iron bridge built by the Næs Ironworks

Åmotbrua is a suspension bridge now located in Grünerløkka, Oslo. Originally built in 1851 - 1852, it is now a pedestrian bridge over the Aker River on Grünerløkka in Oslo. It was originally built to cross the Drammen River, near the mouth of the Simoa creek at Åmot in Modum Municipality. The bridge was built in 1851-1852, and was Norway's second chain bridge, of cast iron chains (of three), cast iron by the Næs Ironworks.

In 1853 another iron works, Egelands Verk at Eikeland village in Gjerstad Municipality in Aust-Agder, was purchased for 80,000 Norwegian speciedalers, and was operated as a subsidiary of the undertaking at Næs.

In the 1850s new technologies emerged that made use of blast furnaces fueled with charcoal outdated, but Naes works chose to continue to rely on the old technology, and focused instead on developing specialized niche products. These products included horseshoe nails, axes, files, crucible steel products and rolling mill products.

The company declared bankrupt in 1884. The Egeland Works were sold and later abandoned. Operations at Naes were restarted under the aegis of a corporation, in which the family Aall was able to retain a majority share. The new company was named A/S Jacob Aall & Søn. In addition to the blast furnace operation, the company ran a pulp mill and included forestry, agriculture, mining and milling activities. In 1886, it built a new blast furnace following the Swedish pattern, and specialized crucible steel production was expanded. At the turn of the century the ironworks employed 400 men, 120 of them permanent employees. Further financial setbacks occurred and the blast furnaces were closed for good in 1909. The iron works were selected as the millennium site for Aust-Agder county. The works were added to the list of priority technical and industrial cultural heritage by the Norwegian Directorate for Cultural Heritage.

== Museum ==
In December 1966 the forge, the crucible steel mill and the steel production building were declared protected, along with the fixtures and production equipment, as part of Norway’s technical heritage. A/S Jacob Aall & Søn donated the buildings for use as a museum, along with the area where they were standing. The Naes Ironworks Museum (Næs Jernverksmuseum ) was established with a board consisting of Norwegian Museum of Science and Technology, Norwegian Directorate for Cultural Heritage and the Aust-Agder Museum, with administration the responsibility of the latter.
