= J.W. Cappelens Forlag =

Norwegian publisher (1829–2007)

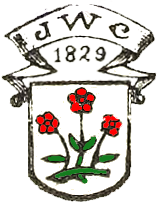
Coat of arms

J.W. Cappelens Forlag, usually referred to as Cappelen, was one of the oldest publishing houses of Norway.

J.W. Cappelens Forlag was founded in 1829 by Jørgen Wright Cappelen, of the distinguished Cappelen family. Torger Baardseth was the director of Cappelen between 1904 and 1943. JW Cappelens Publishing was taken over by the Swedish media group Bonnier in 1987.

In 2007 it merged with N. W. Damm & Søn, another old Norwegian publishing house, to become Cappelen Damm. Its last CEO was Sindre Guldvog. N. W. Damm & Son was founded in 1843 by Niels Wilhelm Damm. It was taken over by the Danish media group Egmont in 1984. It previously merged with Hjemmets publishing in 2001.

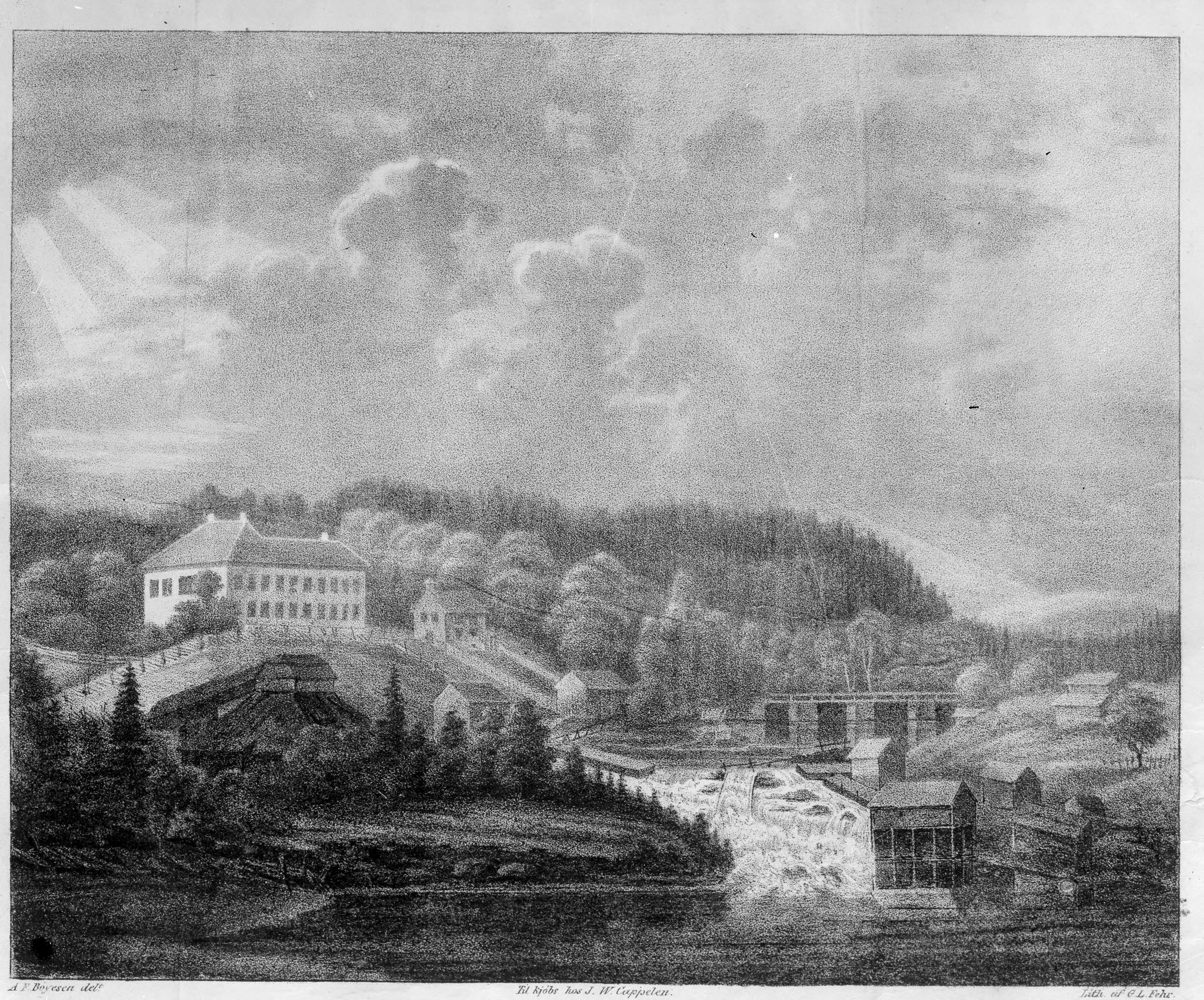
19th-century lithograph sold by Cappelen

.
