= Ulrich Fredrich von Cappelen =

Norwegian businessman, ship owner and timber merchant

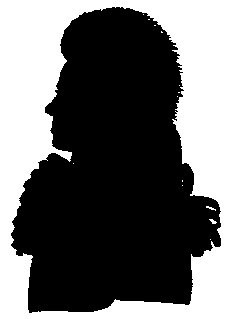
Silhouette of Ulrich Fredrich von Cappelen from around 1790.

Ulrich Fredrich von Cappelen (1770–1820) was a Norwegian businessman, ship owner and timber merchant.

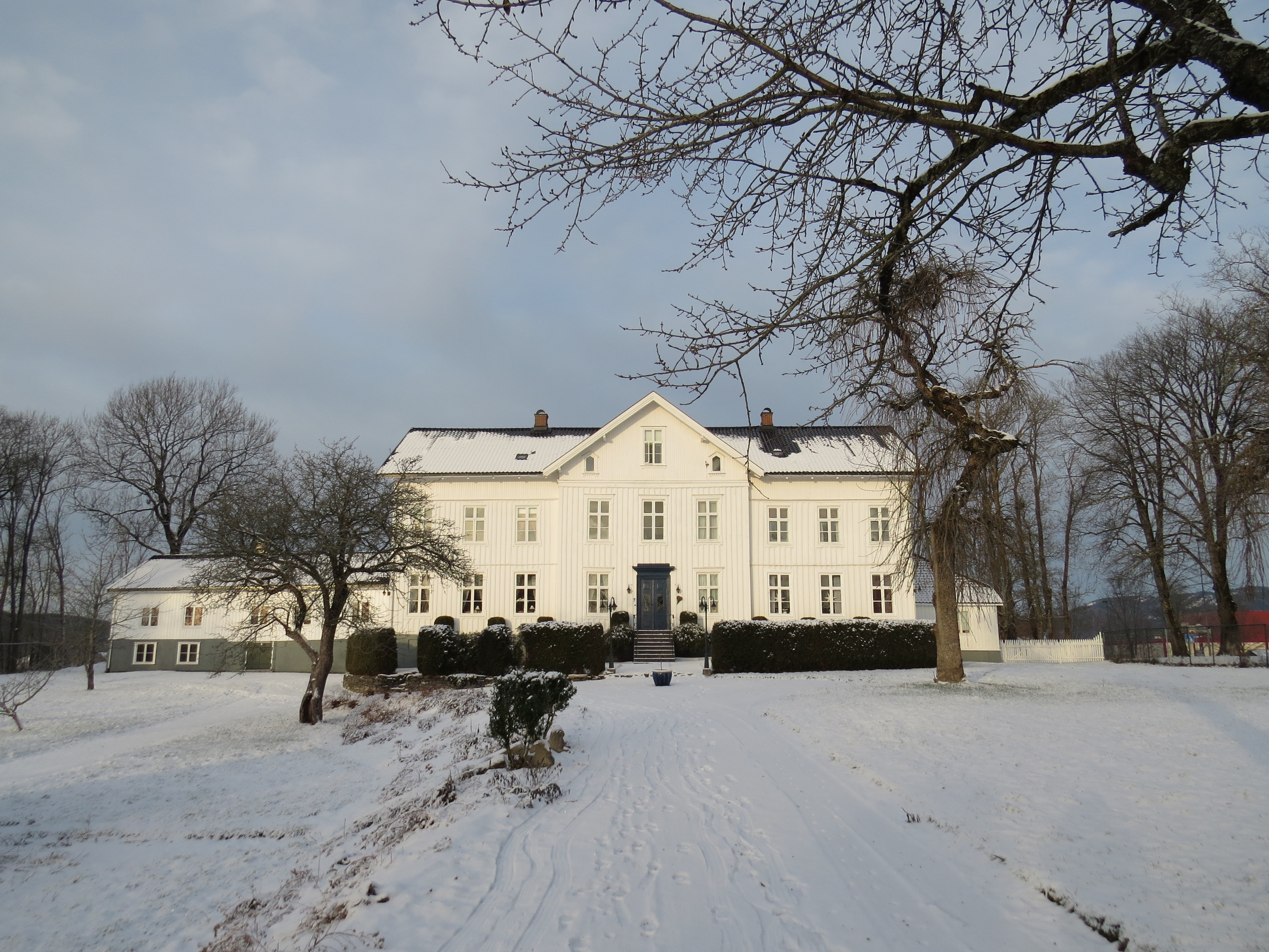
Mæla Manor in Gjerpen

== Personal life ==
Ulrich Fredrich von Cappelen grew up in at Mæla Manor in Gjerpen (Mæla gård i Gjerpen) (located in the present-day Skien Municipality in Telemark county). He was one of the sons of the wholesaler, timber merchant and ship owner Diderich von Cappelen (1734–1794) and his first wife Petronelle Pedersdatter Juel (1737–1785). He had two older brothers, Diderik von Cappelen and Peder von Cappelen, a sister and one younger half-brother.

In 1793 he married Benedicte Henrikke Aall (1772–1812), daughter of Nicolai Benjamin Aall and Amborg Jørgensdatter, née Wesseltoft. The couple had nine children, many of whom became noteworthy citizens. The sons Nicolai Benjamin and Ulrik Frederik became jurists and members of the national parliament. The third son, Wittus Juel, became a merchant in Drammen. The daughters Didricha and Louise were married consecutively to bishop and politician Jens Lauritz Arup. The fourth daughter Benedicte married her cousin Hans Blom Cappelen; their son Didrik became a member of parliament while their daughter Marie married Fritz Trampe Flood of the notable Flood ship-owner family. Their fourth son Jørgen Wright Cappelen moved to Kristiania (now Oslo) and founded the publishing house J.W. Cappelens Forlag. Except for Nicolai Benjamin, they all have descendants living in Norway today.

== Career ==
Some time after the death of his father in 1794, he moved to Porsgrund, and started as a timber merchant and ship owner. He had inherited real estate and other assets with which he bought more property, especially in the rural parish of Eidanger. He operated sawmills and marketed timber.

However, during the Gunboat War (1807-1814), British Naval forces conducted an economic war, regularly seizing merchant vessels. The British Navy also conducted raids and disrupted Norwegian foreign trade. The subsequent Norwegian economic depression had a very negative impact on von Cappelen's mercantile business. He was virtually bankrupt upon his death in 1820.
