= Cappelen Damm =

Norwegian publisher

- Parent company: Egmont
- Status: Active
- Predecessor: J.W. Cappelens Forlag (1829); N.W. Damm & Søn (1843)
- Founded: 2007
- Country of origin: Norway
- Headquarters location: Oslo, Norway
- Publication types: Books; textbooks; audiobooks; e-books; magazines; maps; games
- Nonfiction topics: Fiction; nonfiction; academic; children's literature; educational materials
- Imprints: Flamme Forlag; Fontini Forlag; Cappelen Damm Utdanning
- Revenue: NOK 1.185 billion (2023)
- No. of employees: ~320
- Official website: cappelendamm.no

Cappelen Damm AS is Norway's largest publishing company, producing fiction and nonfiction works, including academic literature. Established in 2007, it resulted from the merger of J.W. Cappelens Forlag, founded in 1829, and N.W. Damm & Søn, 1843. Cappelen Damm is jointly owned by the Bonnier Group and Egmont.

== History ==
=== Predecessor companies ===
==== J.W. Cappelens Forlag ====
J.W. Cappelens Forlag, commonly known as Cappelen, was one of Norway's oldest publishing houses. It was founded in 1829 by Jørgen Wright Cappelen, a member of the prominent Cappelen family. Cappelen served as the first chairman of the Norwegian Booksellers Association, holding the position from 1851 to 1870. After his death, the business was continued by his son, Jørgen Wright Cappelen Jr. (1857–1934). The publishing house and bookshop were split into two separate stock companies in 1957; the bookshop company was liquidated in 1973.

Torger Baardseth served as director of Cappelen between 1904 and 1943. In 1987, the Swedish media group Bonnier acquired the publishing house. Its last CEO before the merger was Sindre Guldvog.

==== N.W. Damm & Søn ====
N.W. Damm & Søn, known as Damm, was established in December 1843 by Niels Wilhelm Damm (1816–1878) as a bookbinding and bookselling business in Christiania (now Oslo). The company received its full name when Damm's son, Harald Christian Damm, became a co-owner. Harald Christian Damm became the sole owner after 1878 and subsequently passed the company to his son, Arne Damm.

In addition to publishing, the company operated both new and used bookstores. The antiquarian bookstore was sold in the 1960s, and the remaining bookstore closed in 1972. Damm specialised in children's books and games. The publishing house was sold from family ownership to Norske Egmont (now Egmont) in 1984. Damm subsequently merged with Hjemmets publishing in 2001.

=== 2007 merger ===
In June 2007, the Bonnier-owned Cappelen and the Egmont-owned Damm merged to form Cappelen Damm, with ownership split 50/50 between the two media groups. The merger created Norway's largest publishing house, combining nearly two centuries of publishing heritage from both predecessor companies. The newly formed company was headquartered in Oslo.

=== Egmont sole ownership (2021) ===
In 2021, Egmont acquired Bonnier's 50 percent stake in Cappelen Damm for NOK 1 billion (approximately US$120 million), making Egmont the sole owner. The transaction was prompted in part by competition concerns arising from Bonnier's concurrent acquisition of a 70 percent stake in the Norwegian publishing group Strawberry Publishing, which would have meant Bonnier held significant interests in two competing major Norwegian publishers.
