= N. W. Damm & Søn =

Publishing house based in Oslo, Norway

N. W. Damm & Søn (Damm for short) was a Norwegian publishing house.

It was established on 4 December 1843 by Niels Wilhelm Damm. It got its name when Damm's son, Harald Christian Damm was taken on board as a co-owner. Harald Christian Damm was the sole owner after 1878, and passed the company down to his son, Arne Damm. In addition to book publishing, the company also owned stores selling both new and used books. The used bookstore was sold in the 1960s, the bookstore closed in 1972.

The publishing house was sold from family ownership to Norske Egmont in 1984. In 2007 it was merged into the new publishing house Cappelen Damm.
