= Diderik von Cappelen =

Norwegian wholesaler, merchant, shipowner, estate owner and politician (1761–1828)

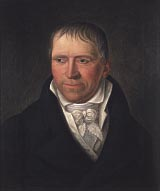
- Born: 21 June 1761; Gjerpen, Norway
- Died: 3 April 1828 (aged 66)
- Occupations: wholesaler, merchant, shipowner, estate owner and politician

Diderik von Cappelen (21 June 1761 – 3 April 1828) was a Norwegian wholesaler, merchant, shipowner, estate owner and politician in 1814. He is often referred to as Diderik von Cappelen but he spelt his name Didrich von Cappelen and is also referred to as Didrik von Cappelen.

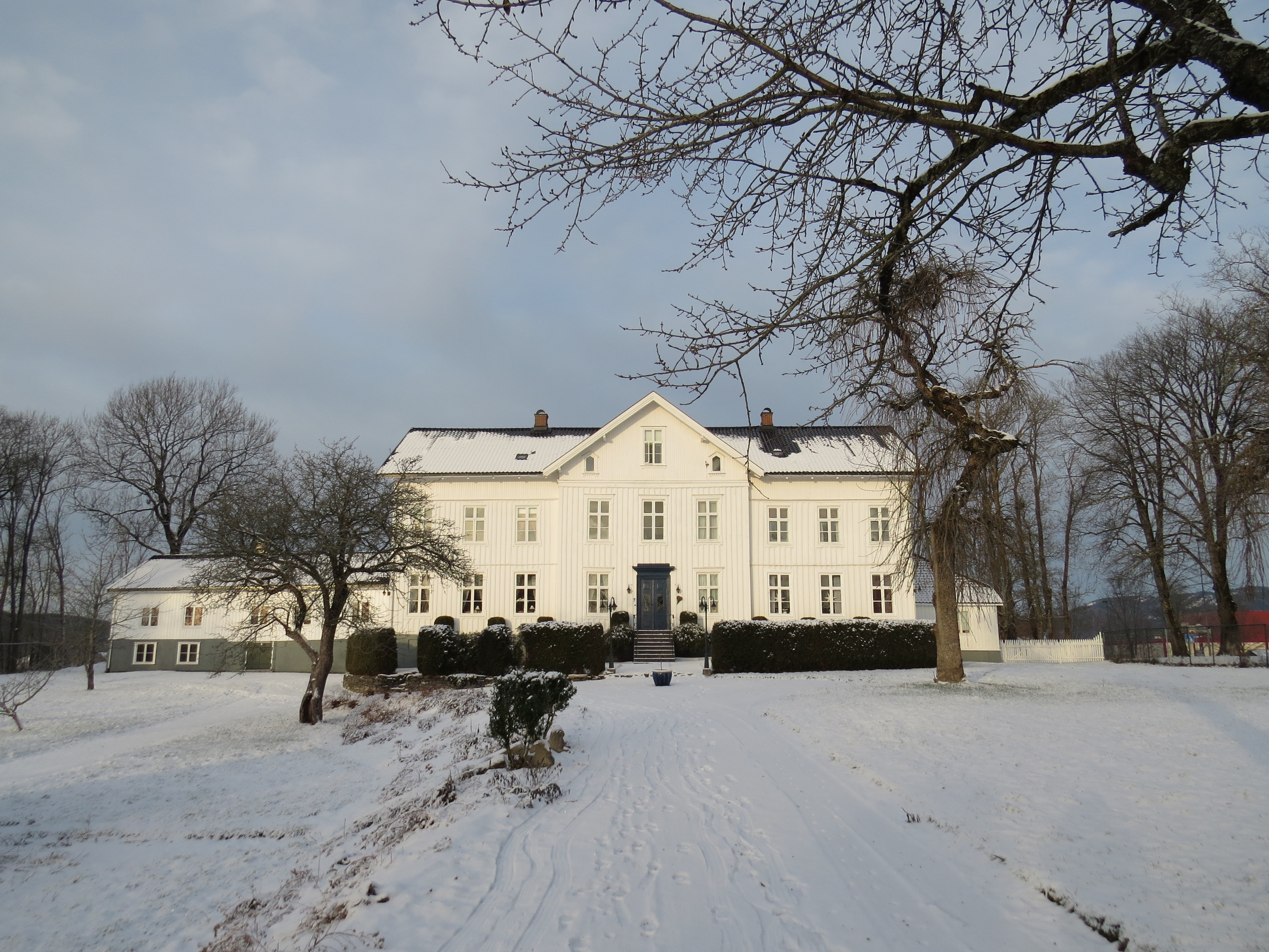
Mæla Gård in Gjerpen

== Personal life and family ==
Cappelen was born at Mæla Manor in Gjerpen (Mæla gård i Gjerpen) which is now part of Skien Municipality, in Telemark, Norway. He was one of the sons of the wholesaler, timber merchant and ship owner Diderich von Cappelen (1734–1794) and his first wife Petronelle Pedersdatter Juel (1737–1785). His father was one of the richest ship owners in Norway. Diderik von Cappelen was the elder brother of Peder von Cappelen, Ulrich Fredrich von Cappelen and Cathrine von Cappelen who was married to Carsten Tank. Cappelen was married twice, first to Maria Plesner from 1787, and from 1800 to Marie Severine Blom.

Diderik von Cappelen was a grandfather of painter August Cappelen and of Axel Nicolai Herlofson. Among other of his descendants are Didrik Cappelen, Hans Cappelen, Andreas Zeier Cappelen and with family names i. a. Cappelen, Anker, Arnesen, Blom, Borgfjord, Finne, Flood, Hofgaard, Lund, Løvenskiold, Nicolaisen, Norby, Prebensen, Skråmestø, Wildhagen and Aall, are several business people, estate owners, politicians, lawyers etc. living in Norway, Sweden, Austria and USA.

== Career ==
Cappelen was educated in his father's business, after being in 1779–80 at Kingswood School outside Bristol where he also met John Wesley. Diderik von Cappelen was a successful businessman continuing and expanding the family business. He was a religious man, he helped several poor people, paid for public schools and roads in Skien and paid a considerable amount of money to the establishing of the first Norwegian university.

He represented Skien at the Norwegian Constituent Assembly in 1814.

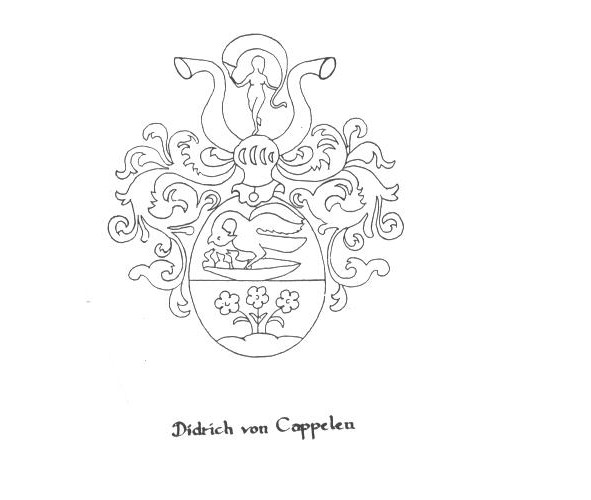
Family coat of arms in Cappelen's seal of 1814. Modern drawing.

== Other sources ==
- Anders Bjønnes m.fl. (ed): Eidsvollsmennene – Hvem var de?, Norsk Slektshistorisk Forening, Oslo 2014 Norwegian
- Jørn Holme (ed.): De kom fra alle kanter - Eidsvollsmennene og deres hus, Oslo 2014 Norwegian
