= Jacob Aall =

Norwegian politician (1773–1844)

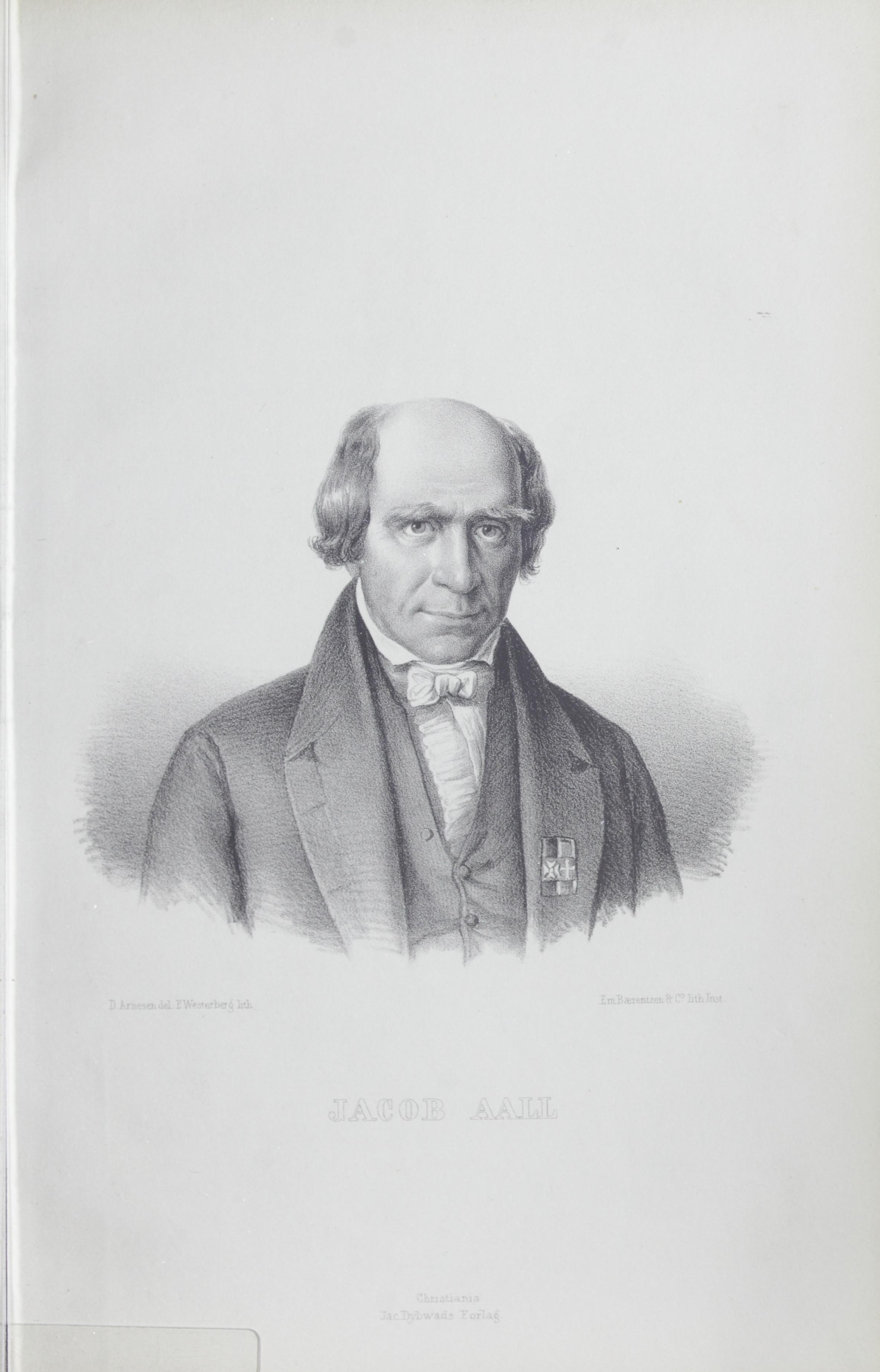
- Lithograph of Aall, published 1856-60

Norwegian Constitutional Assembly
- In office 1814–1814

Member of Parliament
- In office 1815–1817

Member of Parliament
- In office 1821–1823

Member of Parliament
- In office 1827–1829

Member of Parliament
- In office 1830–1832

Member of Parliament
- In office 1839–1841

Personal details
- Born: 27 July 1773 Porsgrunn, Denmark-Norway
- Died: 4 August 1844 (aged 71) Holt, Sweden-Norway
- Spouse(s): Louise Andrea Stephansen (1779-1825) (m.1799)
- Occupation: statesman, historian, landowner and government economist

Jacob Aall (27 July 1773 – 4 August 1844) was a Norwegian politician, historian, landowner and government economist.

He was born the son of Nicolai Benjamin Aall (1739-1798), who was a merchant in Porsgrunn, Norway and owner of Ulefos Manor. He was also the nephew of merchant Jacob Aall (1754-1826).

== Career ==
In 1791, Aall began attending a school in Copenhagen, Denmark where he earned a degree in theology in 1795. After graduating, he returned to Norway where he tried working as a cleric, but he felt that his abilities were not well at use and decided to take up other studies. In 1796, he returned to Copenhagen, where he began studying natural science. In 1797, he journeyed to Germany, touring the scientific schools of Leipzig, Kiel and Göttingen. In Germany he became acquainted with the geologist Abraham Gottlob Werner.

In 1799, after spending the winter at the academy of mines in Freiberg, Aall returned to Norway. Following his father's death, he invested his patrimony in the purchase of the immense Nes Iron-works in the Arendal ore region. After purchasing the iron-works, the operation became more efficient, but was placed in a difficult position at the outbreak of the English Wars in 1801. However, the business persevered.

In 1814 he took a prominent part in the framing of the free Constitution of Norway, and for fourteen years (1816-1830), he was a leading member of the Storting, the Norwegian National Assembly.

As a writer, he translated and published Snorri Sturluson's Heimskringla. His Reminisciences (1844-1845) is a repository of data concerning the contemporaneous history of the Scandinavian peninsula.

In his later years, Aall increasingly withdrew from public life, and left most of the work at the iron-works to his son.

== Personal life ==
In 1799 he married Louise Andrea Stephansen (1779-1825), with whom he had at least one son.

== Legacy ==
Aall lent his name to Jacob Aall Street in Oslo.

He was one of the 41 Norwegian citizens who helped make the creation of the University of Oslo (previously named Royal Frederick University) possible through donations.

Aall was bestowed upon the Medal for Bogerdåd, the Order of Vasa and the Order of the Polar Star.

He was a member of the Royal Norwegian Society of Sciences and the Royal Danish Science Ernes Society.
