= Our Lady of Good Counsel Church, Porsgrunn =

Our Lady of Good Counsel Church
- Vår Frue av det Gode Råd Kirke
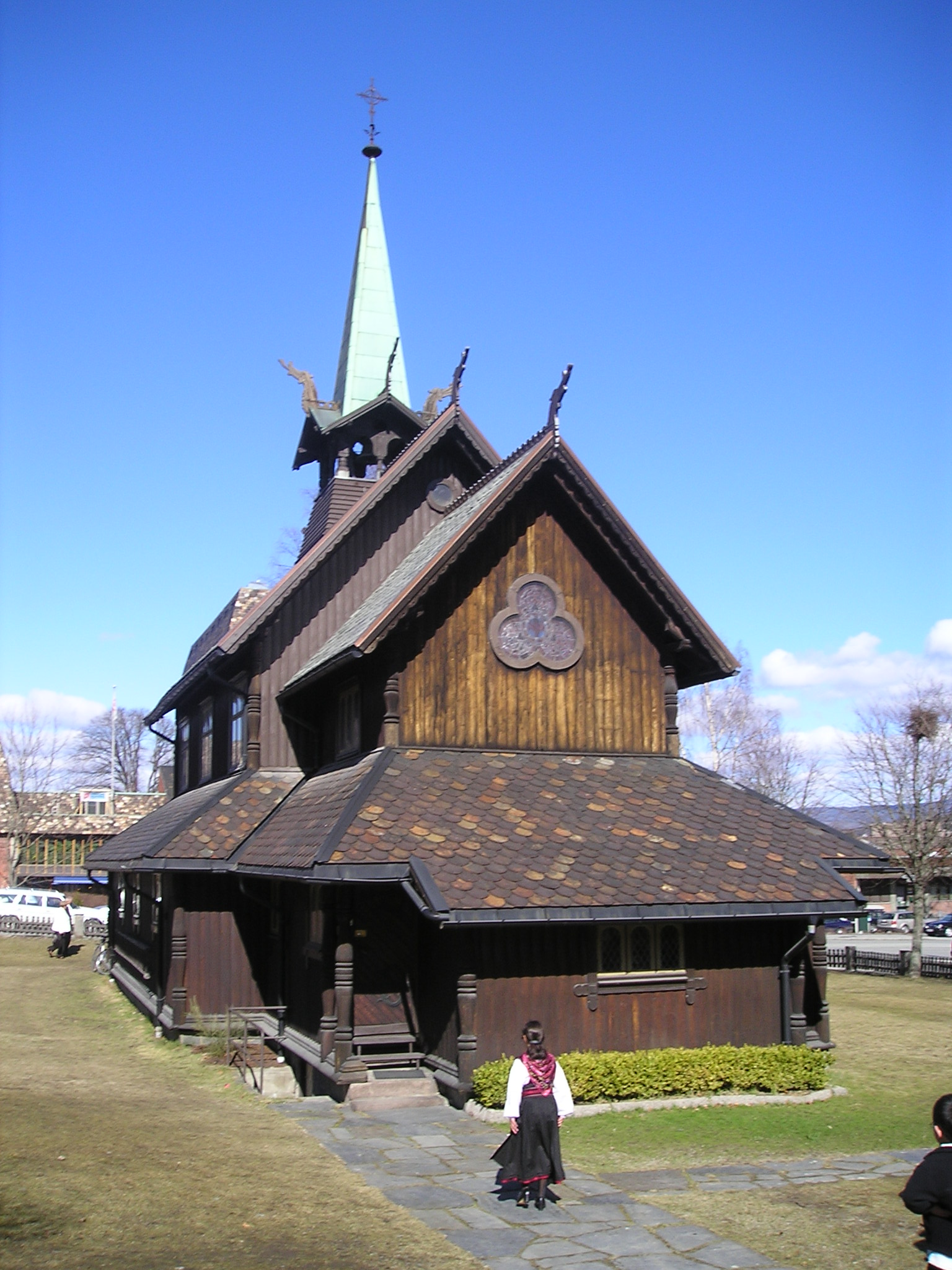
- Our Lady of Good Counsel Church in 2005.

- Location within Telemark Location within Norway
- 59°8′16″N 9°39′6″E
- Location: Porsgrunn
- Country: Norway
- Denomination: Roman Catholic
- Website: Official Website

History
- Status: Parish church
- Founded: 25 June 1885
- Founder: Johannes Henrik Blom
- Dedication: Our Lady of Good Counsel
- Consecrated: 8 October 1899
- Events: 1937: Church moved to present location

Architecture
- Functional status: Active
- Architect: Haldor Larsen Børve
- Architectural type: Design based on Norwegian stave churches
- Style: Dragestil, National Romantic
- Groundbreaking: 4 January 1899
- Completed: 8 October 1899
- Construction cost: ~12,000 kr.

Administration
- Archdiocese: Immediately Subject to the Holy See
- Diocese: Roman Catholic Diocese of Oslo
- Parish: Our Lady of Good Counsel Parish in Telemark

Clergy
- Priest: Fr. Robert Anderson OCSO
- Pastor: Fr. Clement Inpanathan Amirthanathan

Our Lady of Good Counsel Church (Norwegian: Vår Frue av det Gode Råds Kirke) is a Roman Catholic parish church in the city of Porsgrunn in Porsgrunn Municipality in Telemark county, Norway.

The church is located in the center of town just south of Porsgrunn River, at the intersection of Sverresgate and Aallsgate. The church was built in 1899 by Haldor Larsen Børve and is a classic example of Dragestil architecture.

== History ==
In February 1887, the Porsgrund Porcelain Factory (Norwegian: Porsgrunds Porselænsfabrik) began operations in Porsgrunn, and with few Norwegians skilled in porcelain production, the factory management decided to recruit workers from abroad. In the next few years, more than 70 craftsmen and their families moved from Bohemia, then part of Austria-Hungary, to Porsgrunn to work in the factory. Suddenly, Porsgrunn had a huge population of immigrant workers, most of whom were Catholic. This influx of Catholics was especially drastic when seen in context: in Norway's 1900 census, there were only 1,969 Catholics in the entire country.

The burgeoning Norwegian Catholic Church saw the opportunity to expand their ranks, and in 1889 they sent one of their assistant priests in Christiania, Dutch minister Johannes Henrik Blom, to Porsgrunn with the intention of starting a church there. Blom bought the plot of land on which the church was to be built on 25 June of that year. He also rented a small room in a house belonging to the Catholic Vauvert family in the Osebakken neighborhood of Porsgrunn, and made it into a makeshift chapel to hold sermons. The chapel was consecrated on 14 September 1889, representing the start of a practicing Catholic faith in Telemark.

The chapel was also used to hold meetings for some Sisters of St. Joseph of Chambéry who had moved to the area from Oslo with the intention of starting a hospital there. The sisters had moved to Norway in the 1840s after Storting lifted the ban on non-Protestant public religious services, and they would eventually go on to build hospitals in five different Norwegian cities. When Porsgrunn's St. Joseph's Hospital was completed on 14 October 1894, the chapel was moved into the hospital building. However, this too was only a temporary arrangement, and a few years later the Catholic Church in Norway began planning for a new church to be built on Blom's empty lot.

=== Construction ===
The church was commissioned to local architect Haldor Larsen Børve. Børve had at that time made a name for himself by acting as primary architect in the construction of the Langangen Church in the nearby village of Langangen and the Dalen Hotel in Tokke Municipality, a giant wooden hotel in the Dragestil style that was at the time a popular destination for Europe's royalty. He would later go on to design many other buildings in the area, such as the new Porsgrunn City Hall and a funeral chapel for Østre Porsgrunn Church just down the road. The leader of Norway's Catholic Church at the time, Johannes Olav Fallize, was adamant that new churches should reflect traditional Norwegian architecture and pious values, and Børve was seen as the perfect man for the job.

Børve's design incorporated elements from stave churches across Norway along with a few more recent elements, such as the copper-plated bell tower at the church's apex. Construction began on 4 January 1899, by the firm Thovsen & Torjussen, who enlisted the talents of many local craftsmen for detail work. The stained glass windows were imported from Berlin, and the church bells from the Olsen Nauen Bell Foundry in Sem in Tønsberg Municipality, which also manufactured bells for many other churches across Norway including the Oslo Cathedral and Trinity Church in Arendal. Construction was finished on 8 October of the same year, and the church was consecrated on the same day to Our Lady of Good Counsel. The church cost about 12,000 kroner in all, which was funded in part by a significant donation from local politician and Catholic convert Carl P. Wright.

=== Relocation ===
The church sat on that same property for 38 years. However, in the 1930s a change in Porsgrunn's road system left the church in a very inconvenient location, and a planned new Folkets hus would leave it almost boxed in. Therefore, it was decided that the church be moved to its current location on the other side of Sverresgate. A new foundation was built across the street, and special iron rails were built, upon which the building would be moved on many iron rollers. In 1937, the church was moved across the street, drawing a large crowd of local residents. One sister of St. Joseph who witnessed the event wrote in her memoirs: "The whole town attended the event with excitement ... Suddenly the Catholic church was the center of all attention, especially when the building stood for a few days in the middle of the street, blocking all traffic." After the church was moved over to the new foundations, a new weaponhouse room was added which included an overhead gallery to provide room for extra seating. The church was consecrated again at its new location on 10 October 1937.

Today, Our Lady of Good Counsel Church is the last of the Dragestil churches commissioned by Fallize still holding mass, with the other churches in Stavanger, Drammen, and Fredrikstad having since been replaced with newer and larger buildings.

== Our Lady of Good Counsel Parish ==
The church is the parish church of the Our Lady of Good Counsel Parish of Norway, and thus the parish shares its name as is custom. The parish comprises the entire Telemark county, except for the western municipalities of Nissedal and Fyresdal. The parish borders the parishes of St. Franciskus Xaverius in Arendal to the southwest, St. Paul in Bergen to the west, and St. Laurentius in Drammen and St. Frans in Larvik to the north. As of 2012, the parish priest is Sri Lankan-born Father Clement Inpanathan Amirthanathan, replacing Father Reidar J. D. I. Voith who had moved to the position of parish priest in Stavanger.

As of 2011, the parish has almost 2,300 members, and just like the church's early days, it includes a large immigrant population. Our Lady of Good Counsel's membership includes people of about 80 different nationalities, and it holds mass in four languages: Norwegian, English, Polish, and Vietnamese. Of the parish's population, only slightly over half were born in Norway, with the next most common nationalities being Vietnamese, Filipino, and Polish. Most of the church's members live in the Grenland area, since Porsgrunn contains the only church in the parish, but there are also masses held once or twice a month at chapels in Kragerø, Notodden, Rjukan, Tokke, and Drangedal.

=== Convents ===
Apart from the five chapels across Telemark, the parish also features a small monastery near Lake Tinn, built in 1977. The monastery was started by Robert K. Anderson OCSO, an immigrant from Minnesota, on a disused farm called Hylland. There is now a small community of trappist monks on the site and a small chapel they built by hand, in which they hold mass for Eastern Rite twice weekly.

Benedictine convents such as the one at Hylland are not unusual for the area: in fact, there is evidence of such convents existing all the way back in the 12th century. When the lendmann Dag Eilivsson returned home from the Norwegian Crusade, he was inspired by the monastic life he had seen while wintering in southern England. He decided to build a covenant on his property on Gimsøy island, approximately where Dir. Smidths gate lies in Skien today. The Gimsøy Abbey, as it became known, served as a nunnery for centuries until the 1500s, when the Reformation caused its dissolution. Nuns from this abbey are likely what gave Porsgrunn its name, as they often went into the area to gather pors (Myrica gale). The buildings burnt to the ground in the 1500s, and there is no trace of them on the island today.
