= Haldor Børve =

Norwegian architect

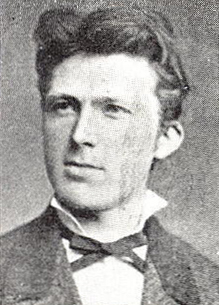
Haldor Larsen Børve'

Haldor Larsen Børve (19 August 1857 – 11 August 1933) was an architect from Ullensvang Municipality in Hordaland county, Norway. Børve started an architectural practice in Porsgrunn in 1889 and designed numerous buildings in Telemark and Vestfold counties, many of them influenced by Dragestil and the Nordic National Romantic style. Among his best-known works are Dalen Hotel from 1894 and Porsgrunn City Hall from 1904/1905.

== Background ==
Børve was born in Ullensvang in 1857 to farmer Lars Jørgensen Børve (1815–91) and Anna Haldorsdatter Eidnes (1822–1911). He attended Trondheim Technical Vocational School (Norwegian: Trondhjems Tekniske Læreanstalt) from 1877 to 1880, after which he worked for a few years as a junior architect. His only major project during this time was managing the restoration of Ullensvang Church in Ullensvang Municipality from 1883 to 1886, a project led by Bergen architect Christian Christie. In 1887, he pursued further education at the Polytechnic Institute of Hannover in Germany. He was among the last of the great Norwegian architects to attend the architectural school in Hannover, which had greatly influenced Norwegian architecture in the latter half of the 19th century. He finished his studies in 1889, and with the help of a government grant for engineers, he moved to Porsgrunn in Telemark, Norway and started his own architectural firm that same year. In 1890, he married Kristine Jørstad (1861–1941).

== Career ==
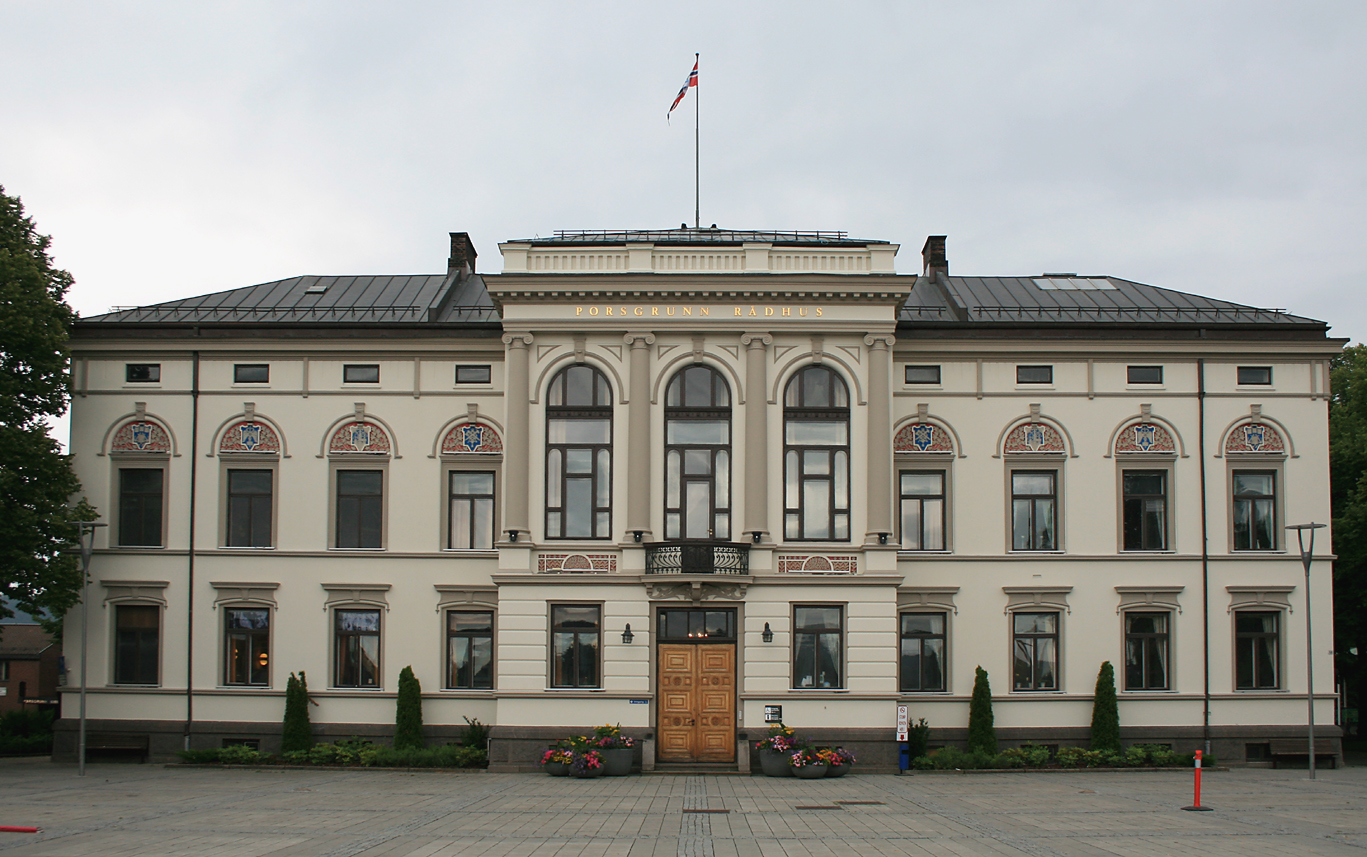
Porsgrunn Town Hall

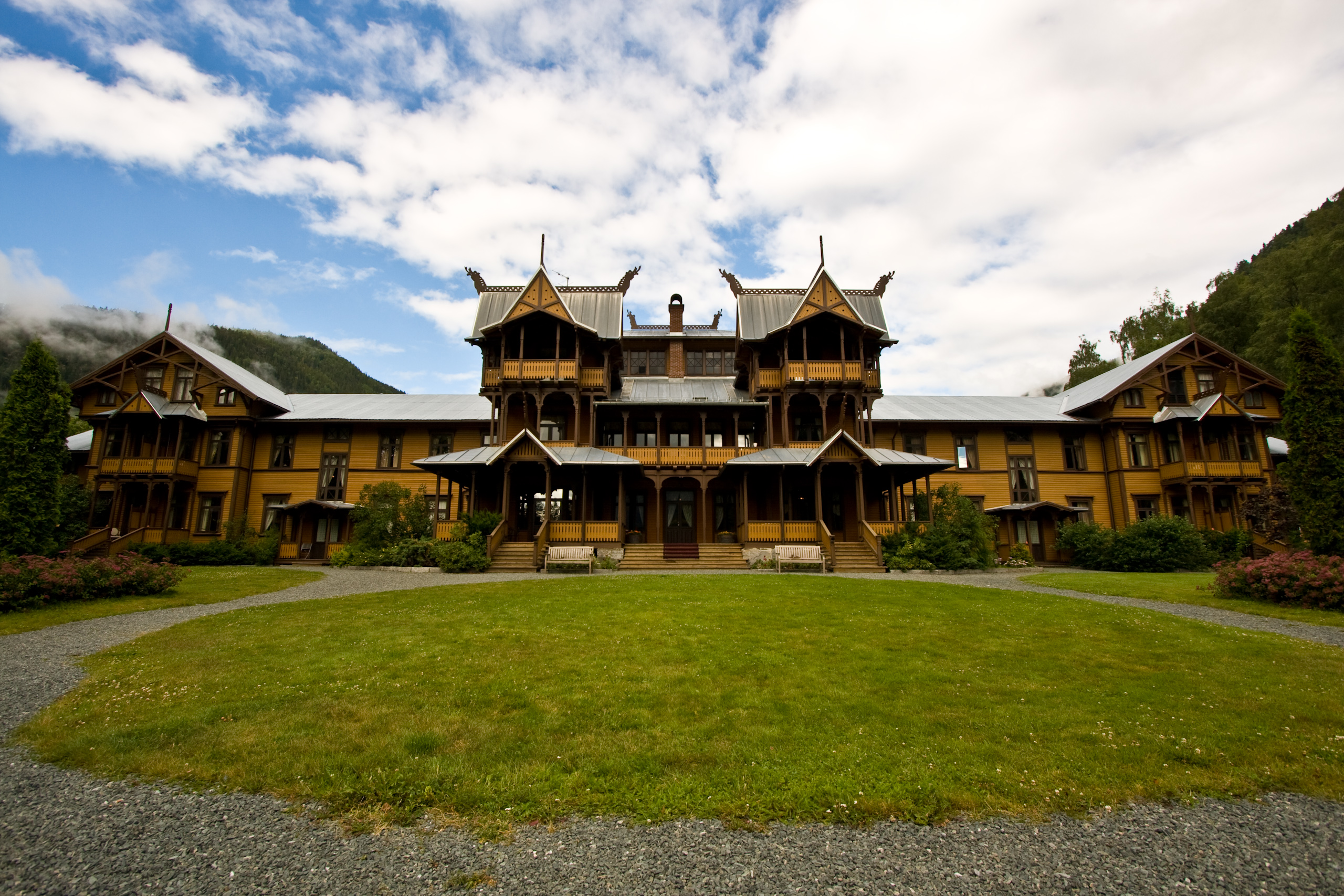
Dalen Hotel at Tokke in Telemark, Norway

Haldor Larsen Børve's first work under the new firm was the Borgestad school (Borgestad skole) built in Skien in 1889. The building was bestowed upon the local school district by local shipping magnate and future prime minister Gunnar Knudsen. Though the building has long since been demolished, it was once a grand three-story stone building in the Neo-Gothic style, a symmetrical design with steep gables on both ends which featured Gothic window designs and pointed arches.

While Børve had learned a great deal about contemporary German architecture during his studies in Hannover, as shown in his use of Neo-Gothic and Swiss chalet styles. He was also a great proponent of Norwegian romantic nationalism and often integrated elements from Dragestil and National Romantic style into his work, as exemplified by Dalen Hotel, Børve's best-known work. In addition to his architectural practice, Børve was also the head teacher and later administrator at Porsgrunn Technical Evening School (Norwegian: Porsgrunns tekniske aftenskole). He was active as an architect until the early 1920s, and died in 1933 at Porsgrunn, aged 75.

Following Børve's death, his daughter, architect Alfhild Børve, took over her father's practice along with Haldor Larsen Børve's assistant Ødegaard. The next year, Johannes Laurentius Borchsenius (1903–2003) took over as co-owner with Alfhild Børve, and the firm changed its name to Børve Borchsenius Arkitekter. Borchsenius was an architect from Skien who studied at the Norwegian Institute of Technology. He was responsible for the construction of camps for Norwegian refugees in Sweden during World War II and, following the war, the reconstruction of areas in Finnmark county such as Vadsø and Kirkenes. The newly named firm designed several buildings in the Porsgrunn area using functionalist principles, including the Folkets hus just across from Børve's Vår Frue Church. The company still exists today under the same name, making it one of the longest-running architectural firms in Norway.

== Major works ==
=== Croftholmen ===
With the exception of Gunnar Knudsen's Borgestad School in 1889, the mansion on Croftholmen (now Croftholmen High School) in Stathelle was Børve's first major work under his new firm. The work was commissioned by Frederic Croft in 1890. Croft was a very wealthy Englishman whose father, William Croft, was a mine owner in Yorkshire who also had a high position in "The Norway Mining Timber Company" in Hull. Frederic Croft had trained in England as an engineer, but in 1870 he took one of his father's boats and sailed away to Norway, reportedly to forget a painful love story from back home. Croft also had a reputation of being a very eccentric figure. He was among the first people to own an automobile in the county, and one story involved him being ticketed for scaring the horses while driving through Porsgrunn. The policeman issued him a fine of twenty kroner, and Croft handed him forty kroner instead. When told again that the fine was only twenty kroner, Croft replied, "But I will also return home."

After considering several properties on which to build his estate, including on the island of Bjørkøya in Langesundfjord, Croft settled on the island Gjermundsholmen in Stathelle, for which he paid 10,000 kroner. Before Croft bought the island, Gjermundsholmen was densely forested and a popular location for vagrants, and it allegedly received its name from a man who was killed by vagrants there. Croft commissioned Børve to build the main house on the island in 1890. While digging the building's foundation, the workers found a human skeleton that they estimated could have been there for ten or fifteen years. The construction was led by master builder Sigurdsen from Skien and it took 25 builders until 1895 to complete. Since 1957 the building has been used as a school, first as a navigational school for sailors and now as a high school.

The building has a distinctive Dragestil architectural style and is painted dark red, originally with a high-quality paint imported from England. It exhibits many features of the style, including eaves adorned with dragon heads and a roof with several decorative spires. The building has an area of 1,872 square metres (20,150 sq ft) and has two floors and a well-secured wine cellar. When Croft lived there the home was lavishly furnished, and some of the pieces of furniture can now be found on display at the Porsgrunn City Museum. The living room was furnished in the rococo style, while the smoking room had heavy brown leather chairs and the hall included some pieces of antique Elizabethan furniture.

=== Vår Frue Church ===
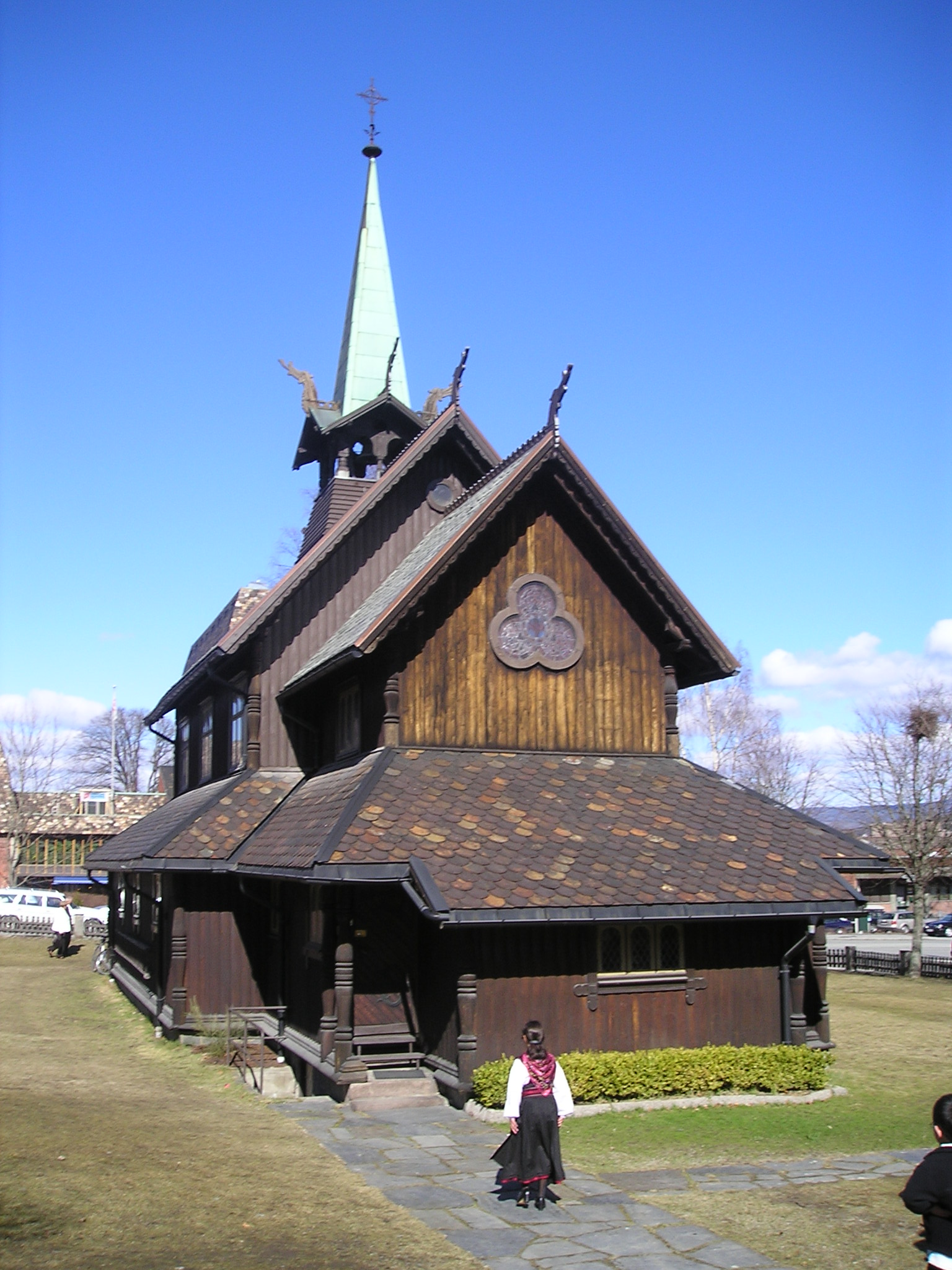
Vår Frue Church in Porsgrunn, built 1899

=== Skotfoss Church ===
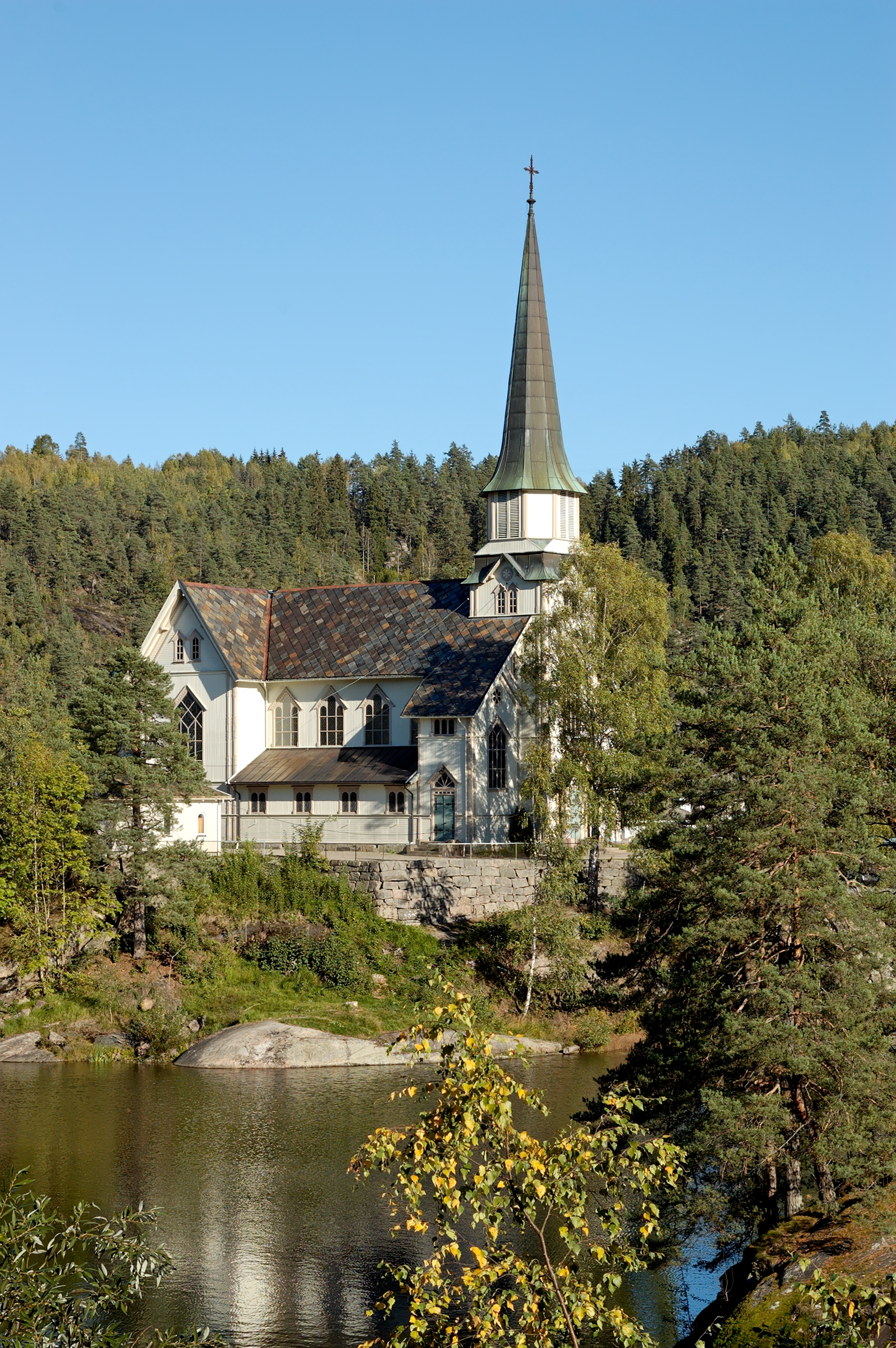
Skotfoss Church, built 1900

The initiative to build a church in Skotfoss was taken by Gustav Fangel Smidt, who managed the nearby Skotfoss Bruk paper mill. At the time, the townspeople of Skotfoss and Dalsbygda had to travel many miles west along the banks of Norsjø to Melum Church (Melum kirke) in order to attend mass. The founders of Union Co. (later the Norske Skog Union), who owned Skotfoss Bruk, agreed to donate 1,000 kroner each towards the construction of the new church, and the remaining 38,000 of the 42,000 kroner cost was split between wholesaler Thor Eger and Rittmester Heftye. The church's site, located on Sandåsen near the entrance to Løveid Canal, was donated by the board of directors of the Norsjø–Skien Canal. Haldor Børve designed the building, and planning and joinery work was completed by workers from Skotfoss Bruk.

== Timeline of works ==
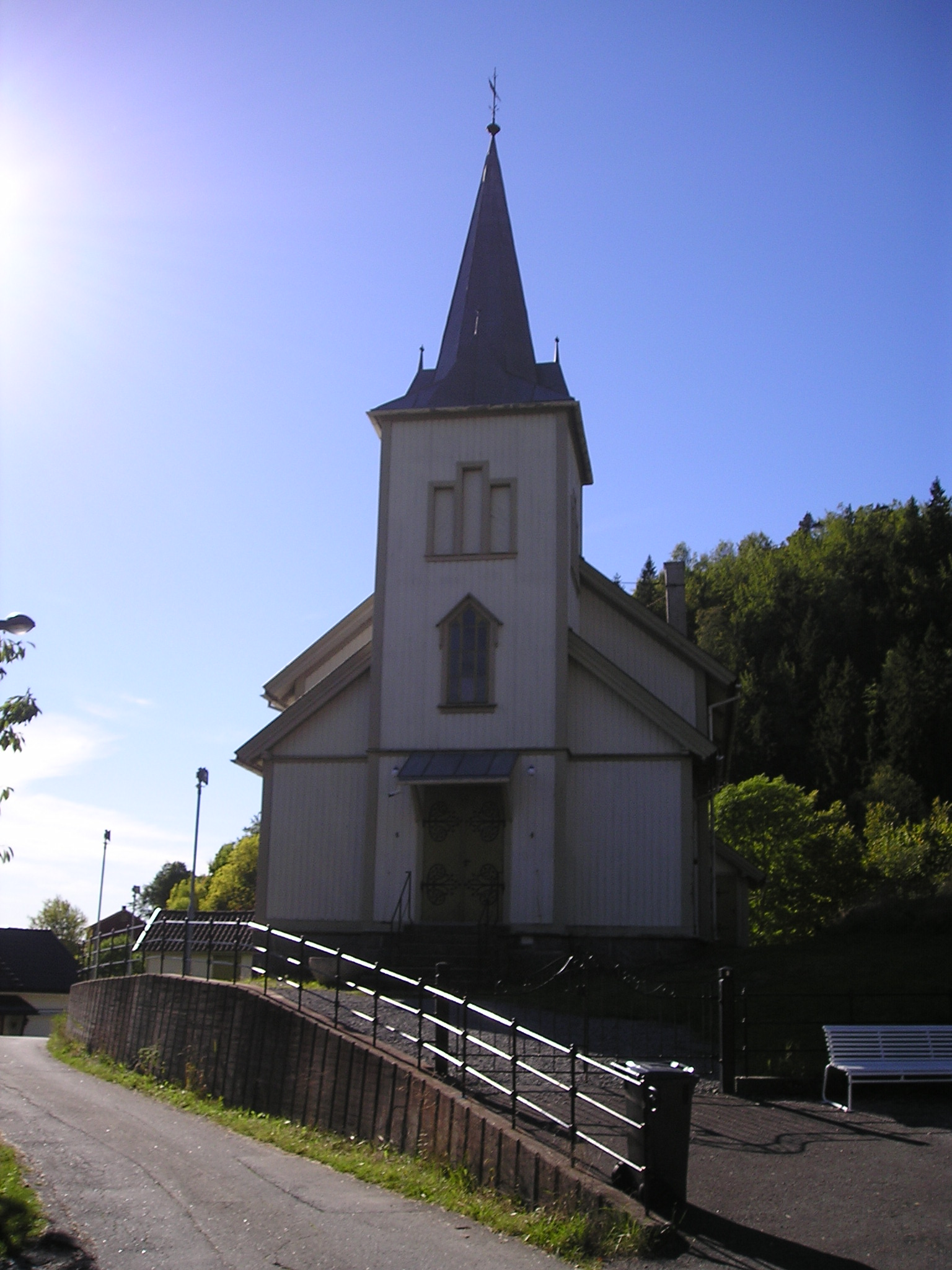
Langangen Church, built 1891

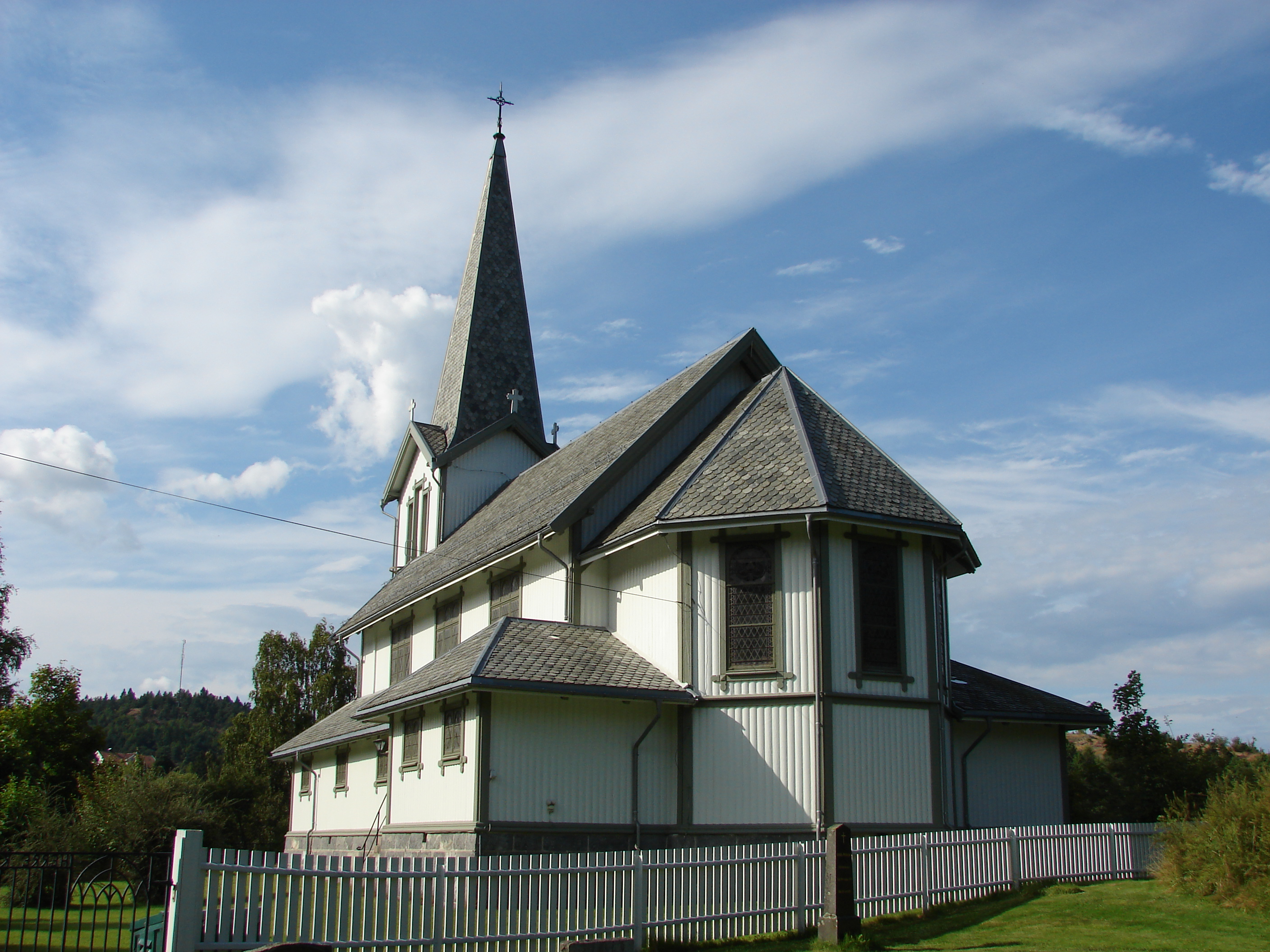
Herre Church, built 1905

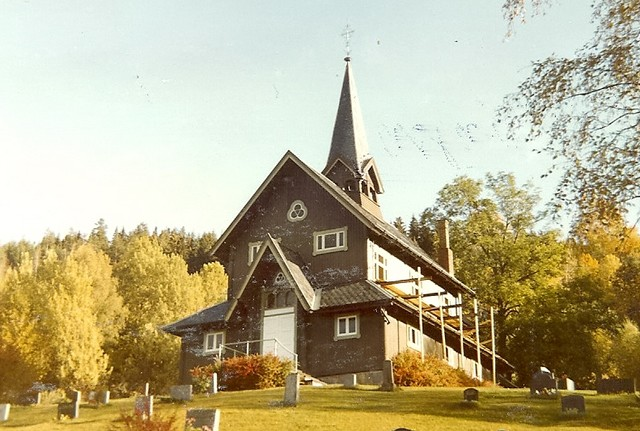
Strandlykkja Chapel, built 1915

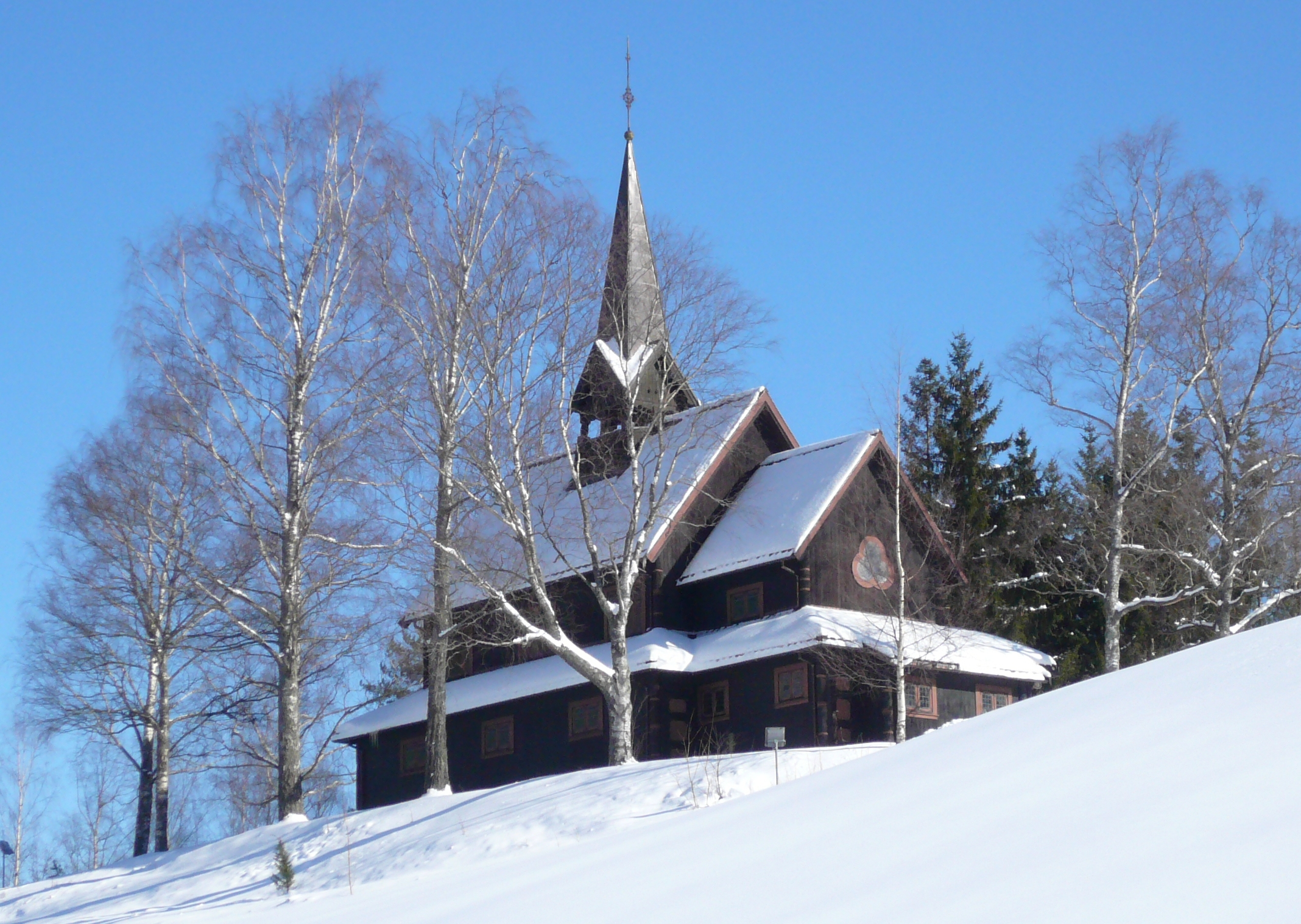
Fjågesund Church, built 1916

=== Churches ===
- 1883–6: Restoration of Ullensvang Church, Ullensvang
- 1891: Langangen Church, Langangen
- 1899: Vår Frue Church, Porsgrunn
- 1899–1900: Skotfoss Church, Skotfoss
- 1905: Herre Church, Bamble
- 1906–7: Immanuel Church, Christopher Hvidts plass 6, Sandefjord
- 1915: Strandlykkja Chapel, Stange
- 1915: Kviteseid Church, Kviteseid (village)
- 1916: Fjågesund Church, Fjågesund
- 1916–18: Sandefjord Methodist Church, Sandefjord

=== Businesses and public buildings ===
- 1889: Borgestad School, Skien
- 1891: Customs House, Porsgrunn
- 1891–92: Fredensborg Woman's Home, Porsgrunn
- 1893: Meat inspection building, Sandefjord
- 1894: Dalen Hotel, Dalen
- 1895: Porsgrunn Swimming Hall, Porsgrunn
- 1897: Gjerpen dairy, Gjerpen
- 1899–1900: Sandefjord Middle School, Sandefjord
- 1899–1901: Porsgrunn Dairy Company, Porsgrunn
- 1900–1901: Porsgrunn Fire Station & Power Station, Porsgrunn
- 1903–8: Sandefjord Retirement Home, Bjerggaten 38, Sandefjord
- 1904–5: Porsgrunn City Hall, Porsgunn
- 1905–6: Hans Cappelens Minne Orphanage, Skien
- 1904: Dyrings Bookstore at Storgaten 154, Porsgrunn
- 1907–9: Bratsberg County Hospital, Skien
- 1908–12: Sandefjord Aktie-Kreditbanken Bank, Rådhusgaten 11, Sandefjord
- 1911: Porsgrunn Lutheran Hospital, Porsgrunn
- 1912: Årlifoss Power Plant, Notodden
- 1915: Hardanger Folk High School, Ullensvang
- 1915-20: County Hospital for Aust-Agder, Arendal
- 1918: Haukerød School, Sandefjord
- 1922: Holt Agricultural School, Tvedestrand
- 1923: Foldsæ Agricultural School, Fyresdal

=== Residences ===
- 1890–1895: Croftholmen mansion, Stathelle
- 1891: Børve's personal villa, Aallsgate 13, Porsgrunn
- 1891: Aallsgate 15, Porsgrunn
- 1891: Farmhouse on Helleland farm, Ullensvang
- 1894: Hjertnespromenaden 3, Sandefjord (town)|
- 1896: Holengården villa, Jernbanegaten 6, Porsgrunn
- 1906: J.C. Knudsen's villa at Øvre Frednes, Porsgrunn
