= Strandlykkja Church =

Church in Innlandet, Norway

- Strandlykkja kirke
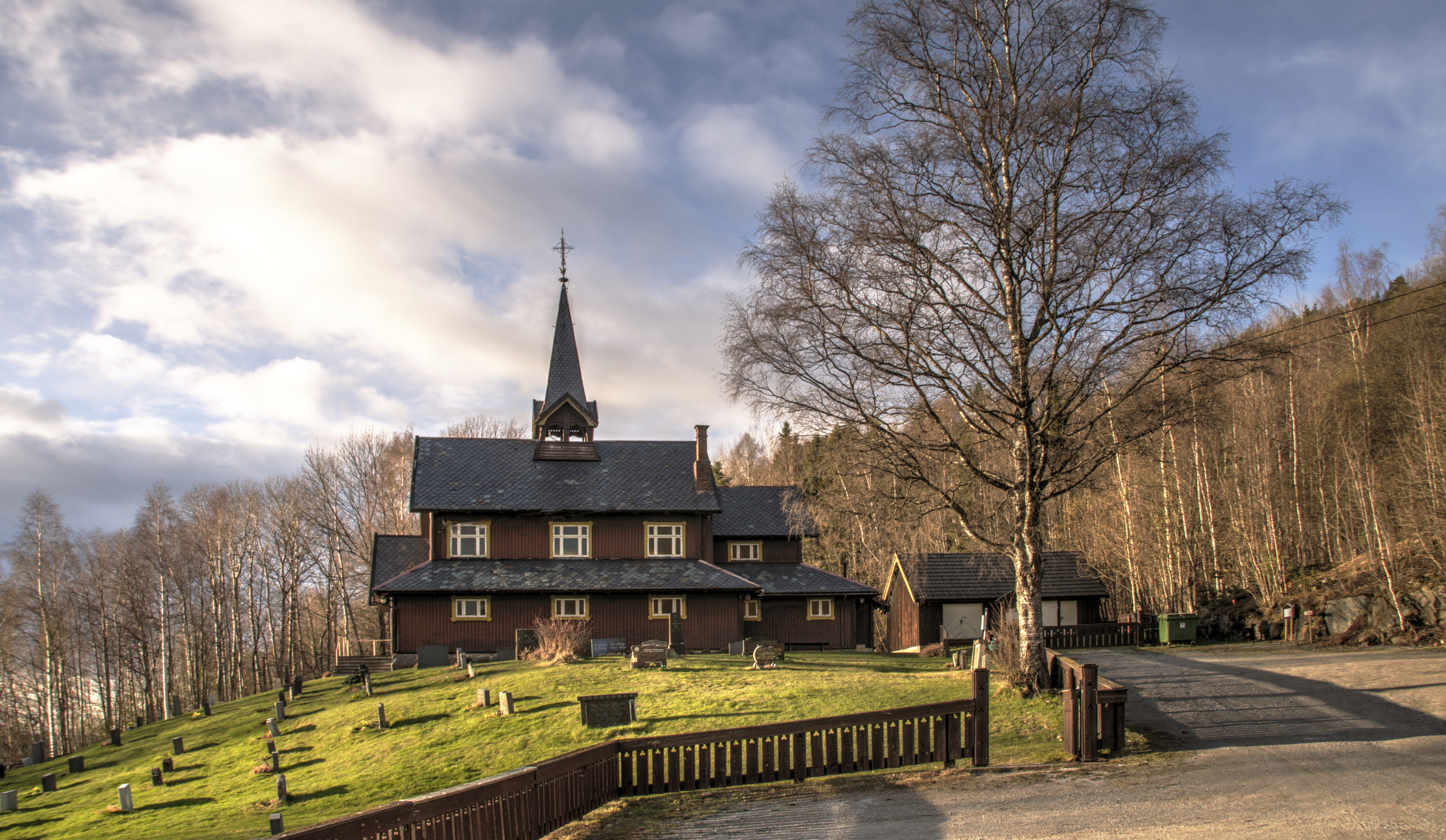
- View of the church
- Strandlykkja Church
- 60°30′49″N 11°14′51″E
- Location: Stange Municipality, Innlandet
- Country: Norway
- Denomination: Church of Norway
- Churchmanship: Evangelical Lutheran

History
- Former name: Strandlykkja kapell
- Status: Parish church
- Founded: 1915
- Consecrated: 12 August 1915

Architecture
- Functional status: Active
- Architect: Haldor Børve
- Architectural type: Long church
- Completed: 1915 (111 years ago)

Specifications
- Capacity: 90
- Materials: Wood

Administration
- Diocese: Hamar bispedømme
- Deanery: Hamar domprosti
- Parish: Tangen
- Norwegian Cultural Heritage Site
- Type: Church
- Status: Protected
- ID: 85600

Strandlykkja Church (Norwegian: Strandlykkja kirke) is a parish church of the Church of Norway in Stange Municipality in Innlandet county, Norway. It is located in the village of Strandlykkja. It is one of the churches for the Tangen parish which is part of the Hamar domprosti (deanery) in the Diocese of Hamar. The brown, wooden church was built in a long church design in 1915 using plans drawn up by the architect Haldor Børve. The church seats about 90 people.

== History ==
By the early 20th century, plans were made to build a chapel in Strandlykkja in the far southern part of the municipality. The building was designed by Haldor Børve and is located on a plot of land that was donated by Berte Marie Strandløkken, the owner of the Strandløkken farm. The church is a stave church-inspired long church with seating for about 90 people. The new chapel was consecrated on 12 August 1915. The chapel was originally designated as an annex chapel under the nearby Tangen Church and it was titled Strandlykkja Chapel. In 2015, the chapel was upgraded to parish church status and re-titled as Strandlykkja Church.

== Media gallery ==
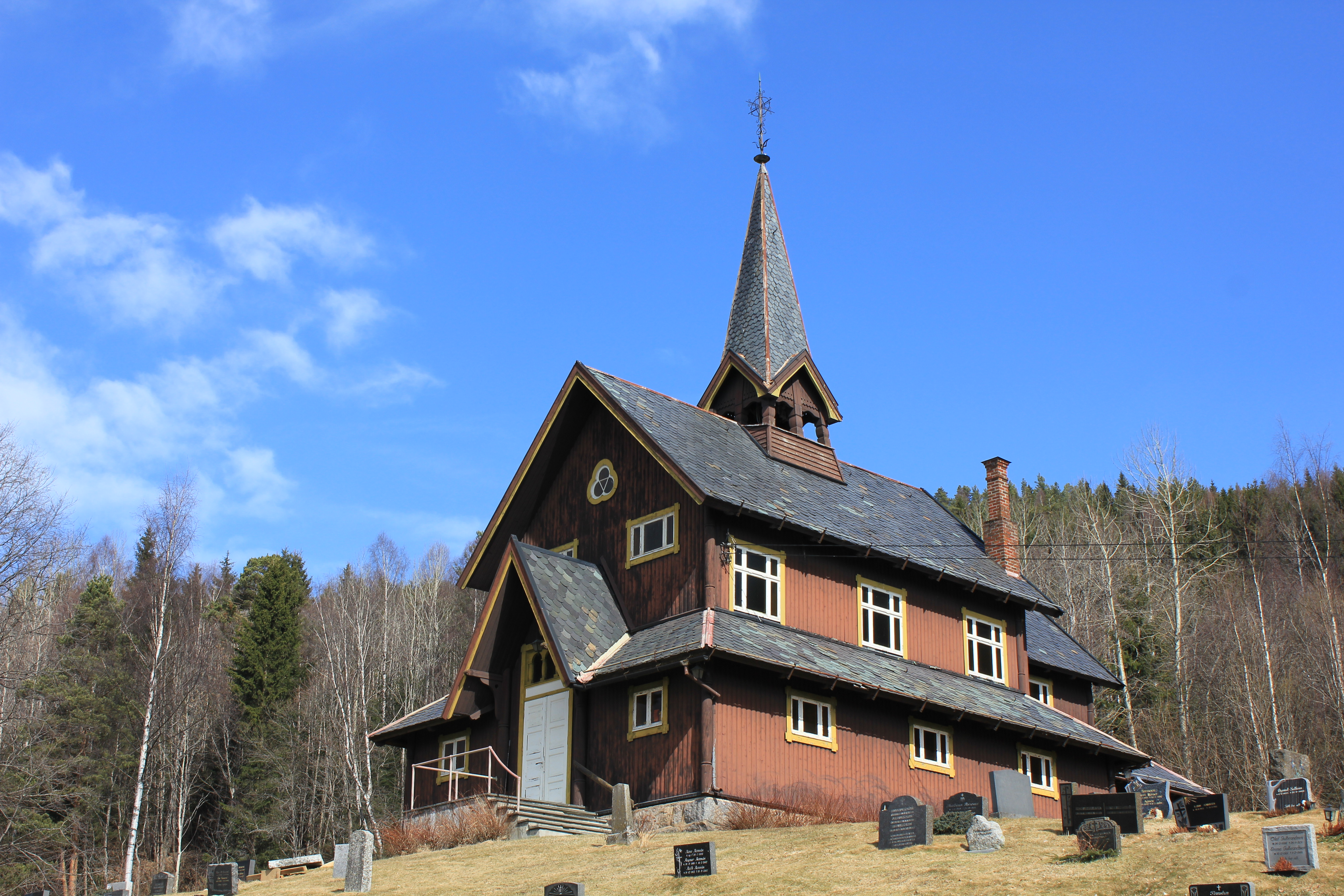

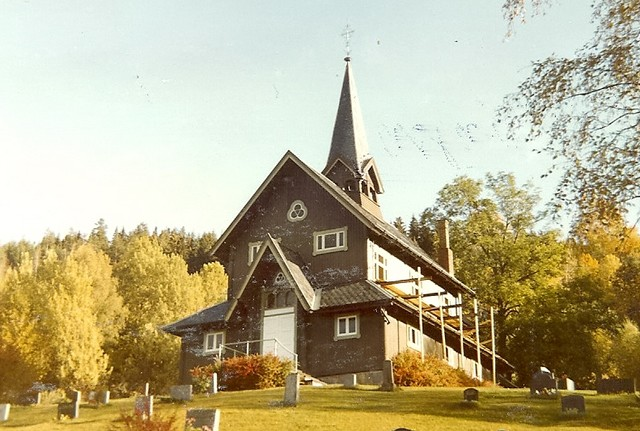

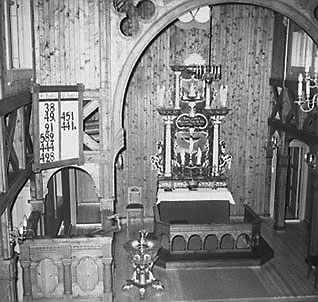

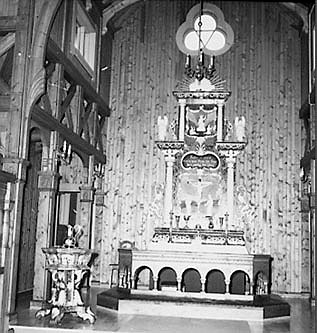

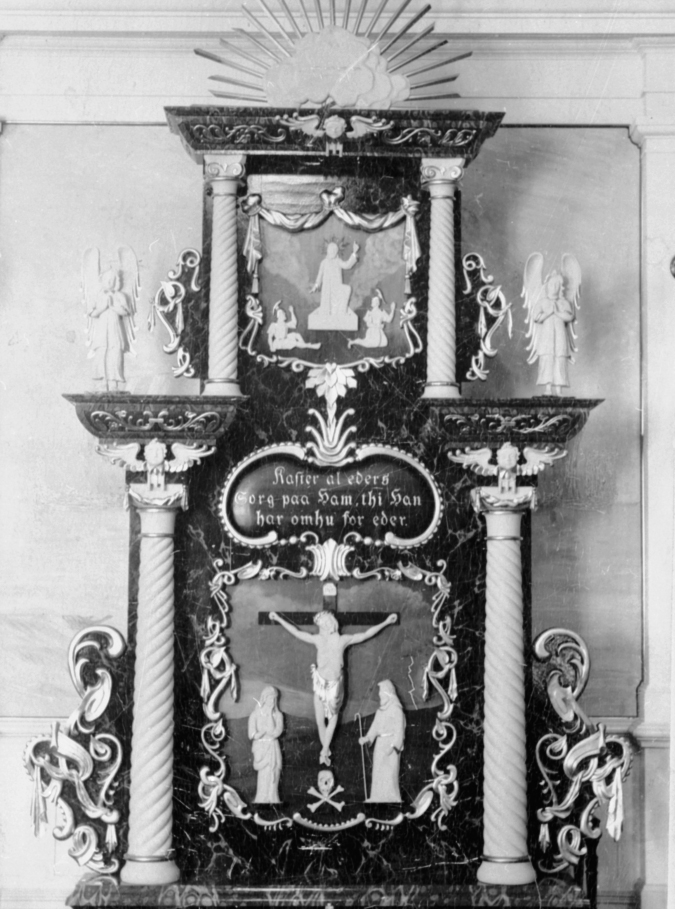

== See also ==
- List of churches in Hamar
