= Fjågesund Church =

Church in Telemark, Norway

- Fjågesund kyrkje
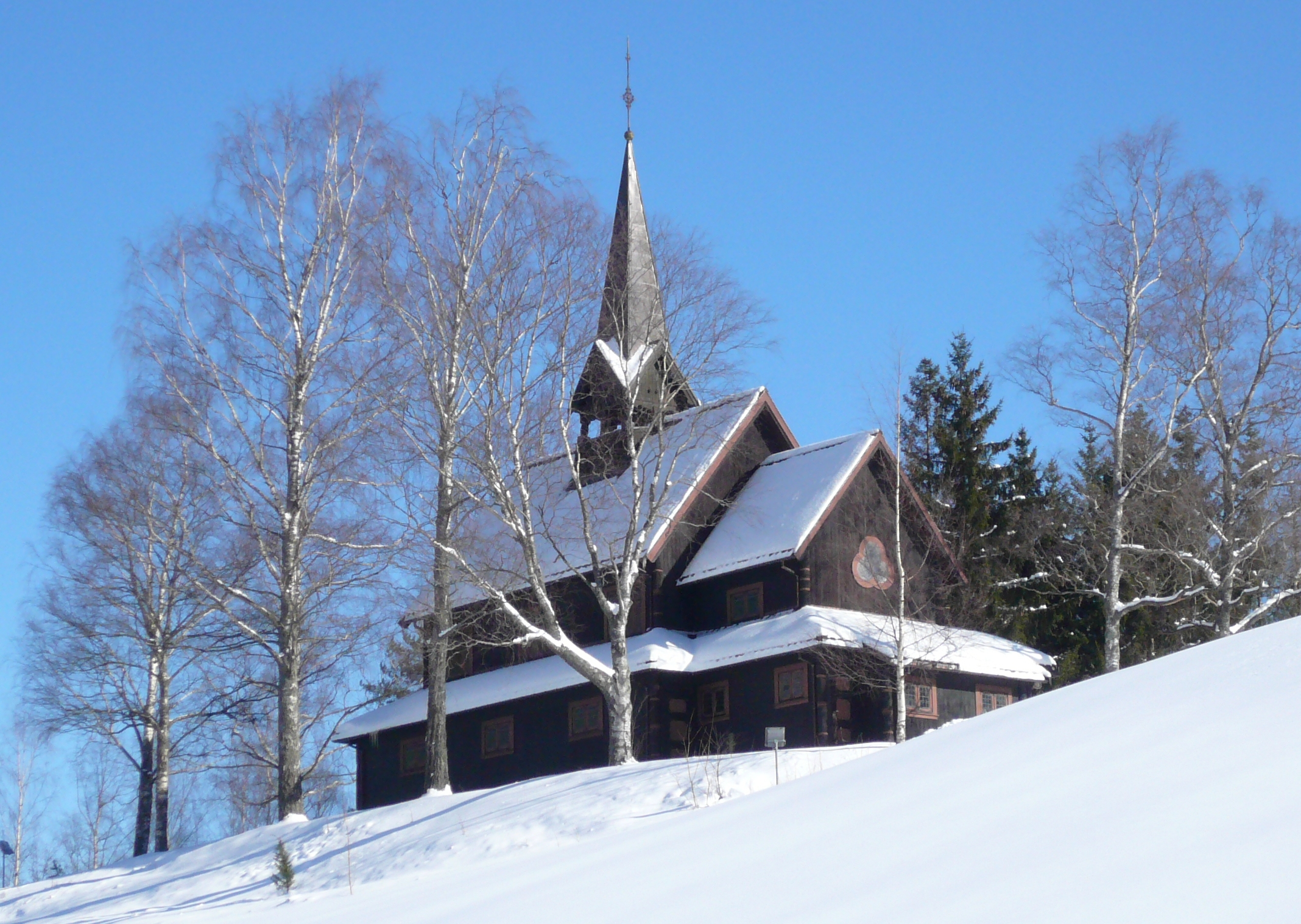
- View of the church
- Fjågesund Church
- 59°18′17″N 8°41′56″E
- Location: Kviteseid Municipality, Telemark
- Country: Norway
- Denomination: Church of Norway
- Churchmanship: Evangelical Lutheran

History
- Former name: Fjågesund kapell
- Status: Parish church
- Founded: 1916
- Consecrated: 19 June 1916

Architecture
- Functional status: Active
- Architect: Haldor Larsen Børve
- Architectural type: Long church
- Completed: 1916 (110 years ago)

Specifications
- Capacity: 108
- Materials: Wood

Administration
- Diocese: Agder og Telemark
- Deanery: Øvre Telemark prosti
- Parish: Kviteseid
- Norwegian Cultural Heritage Site
- Type: Church
- Status: Listed
- ID: 84155

Fjågesund Church (Norwegian: Fjågesund kyrkje) is a parish church of the Church of Norway in Kviteseid Municipality in Telemark county, Norway. It is located in the village of Fjågesund. It is one of the churches in the Kviteseid parish which is part of the Øvre Telemark prosti (deanery) in the Diocese of Agder og Telemark. The brown, wooden church was built in a long church design in 1916 using plans drawn up by the architect Haldor Larsen Børve. The church seats about 108 people.

== History ==
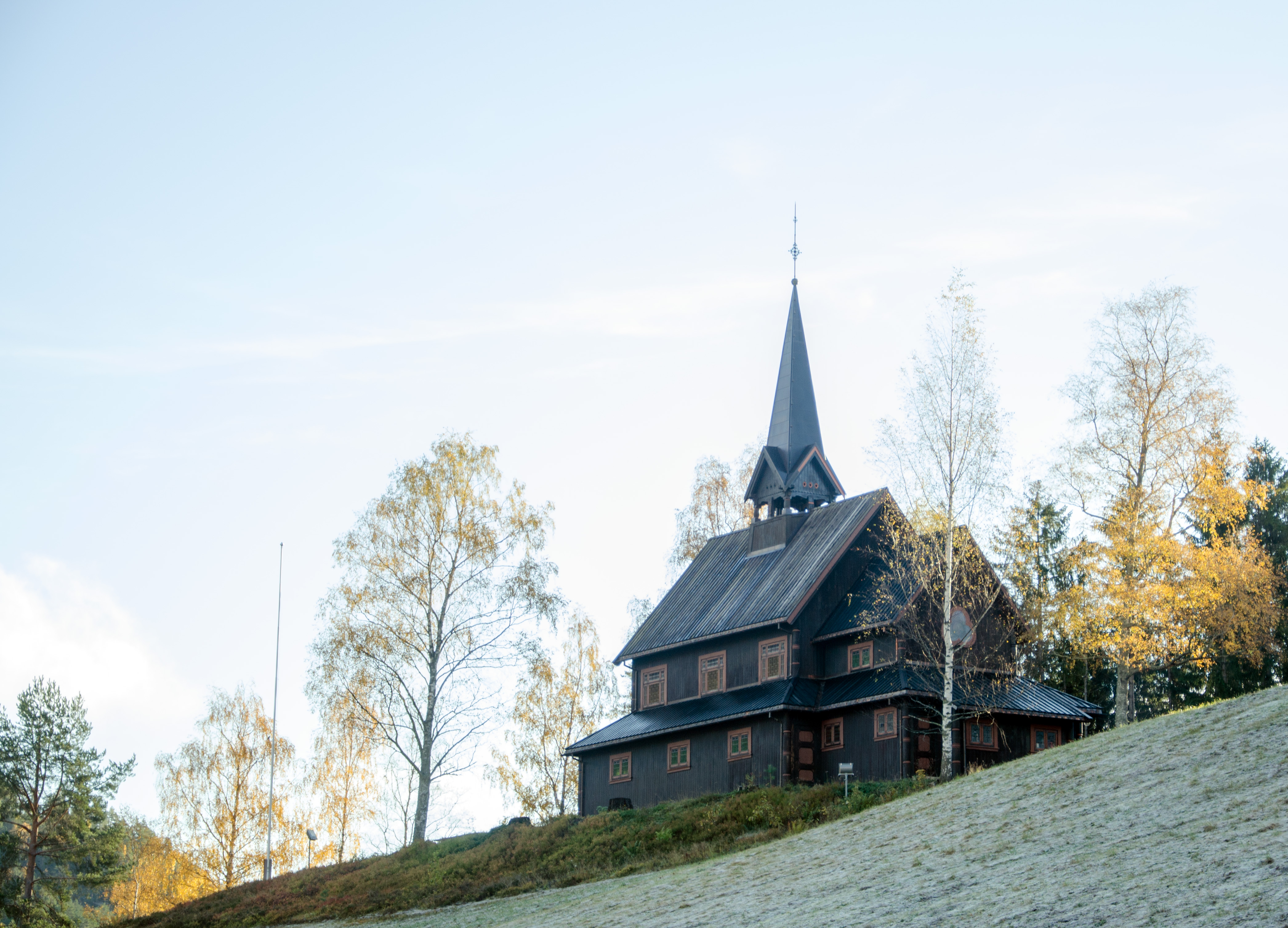
View of the church

The Old Kviteseid Church served the parish of Kviteseid for centuries. The old church was located in the central part of the parish. Over the years, the village of Kviteseid grew up around the northern end of the lake Sundkilen and the old church stood about 6 kilometres (3.7 mi) to the south of there, along the lake Kviteseidvatnet. In 1869, the parish priest moved from the old rectory by the church to a new rectory in the village. In the late 1800s, it was decided to move the Kviteseid Church to the village of Kviteseid, and to compensate for moving it further to the northwest, the parish would also build a brand new church at Fjågesund to serve the eastern part of the parish. Because of the small size of the parish, it took many years to raise the money needed to construct both new churches.

Haldor Larsen Børve was hired to design the new church. A new cemetery in Fjågesund was consecrated in 1901, but on the advice of the parish priest, the church site was placed about 500 metres (1,600 ft) northwest of the cemetery, in the village of Fjågesund. The new church is a wooden long church, obviously inspired by the look of the historic stave churches in Norway. The new Fjågesund Chapel was consecrated on 19 June 1916 (the day after the new Kviteseid Church was consecrated). In 1997, the chapel was renamed Fjågesund Church.

== See also ==
- List of churches in Agder og Telemark
