= Dalen Hotel =

Hotel in Dalen, Telemark, Norway

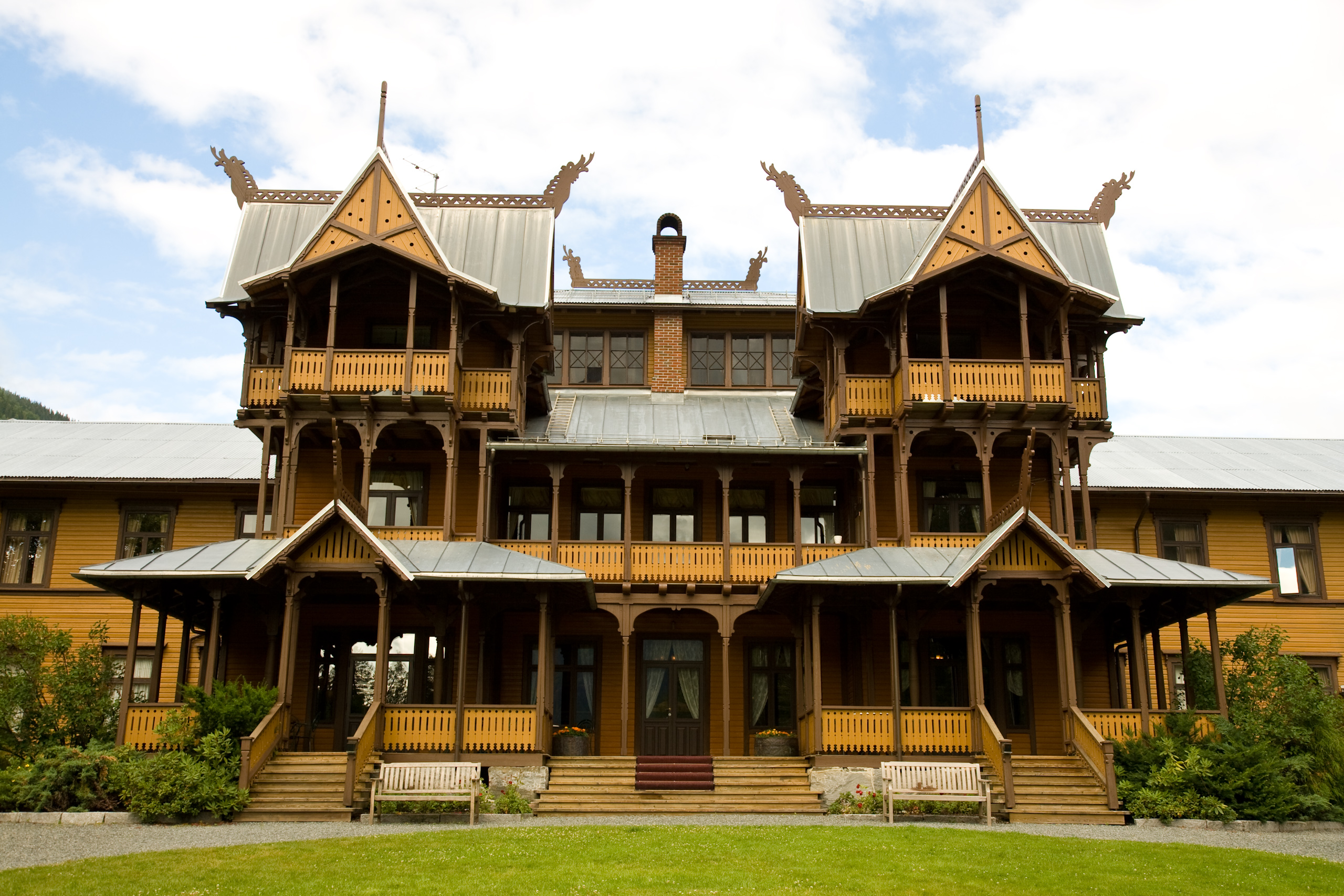
- Dalen Hotel in Telemark
- Interactive map of the Dalen Hotel area

General information
- Type: Hotel
- Architectural style: Dragestil
- Location: Dalen, Telemark, Norway, Hotellvegen 33
- Coordinates: 59°26′35″N 8°00′45″E
- Opening: 1894

Technical details
- Floor count: 2 1/2
- Floor area: 4,500 m^{2} (48,000 ft^{2})

Design and construction
- Architect: Haldor Larsen Børve

Other information
- Number of rooms: 49

Website
- http://www.dalenhotel.no/

Dalen Hotel is a historic hotel located at Dalen in Tokke Municipality in Telemark county, Norway. The luxury Dalen Hotel, once a popular locale for European royalty, is one of the largest wooden buildings in Norway and one of the best preserved hotels of its size from the 1800s.

The hotel is located in eastern Dalen on the shores of Bandak lake. The hotel owners operate a ferry service along the Telemark Canal, which during the warmer seasons has daily trips between Skien and Dalen on the historic passenger ships MS Henrik Ibsen and MS Victoria. The hotel can also be accessed by road on Fylkesvei 38 and 45, which extends down from E134 to the north.

== History ==
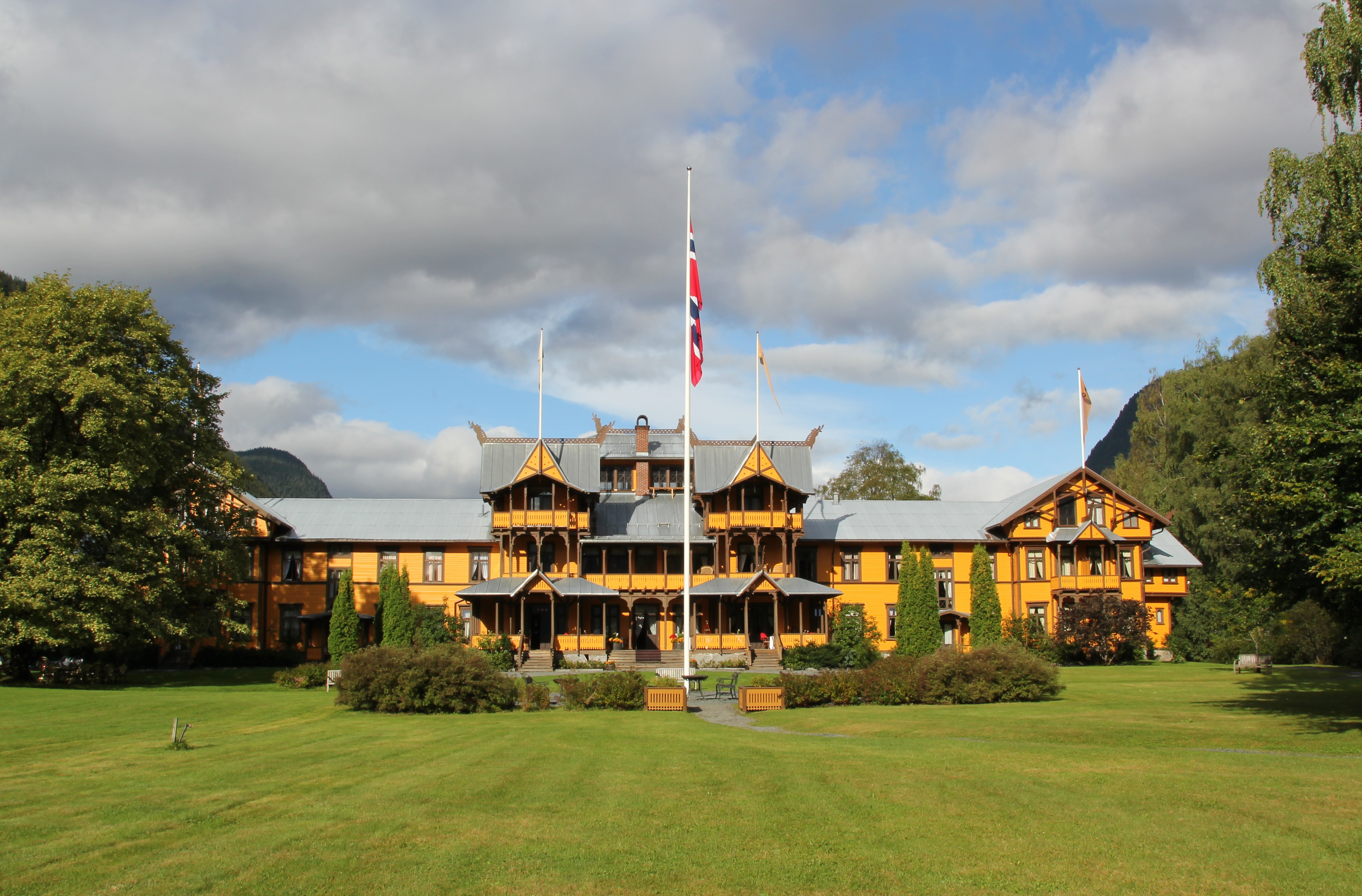
Dalen Hotel in Telemark

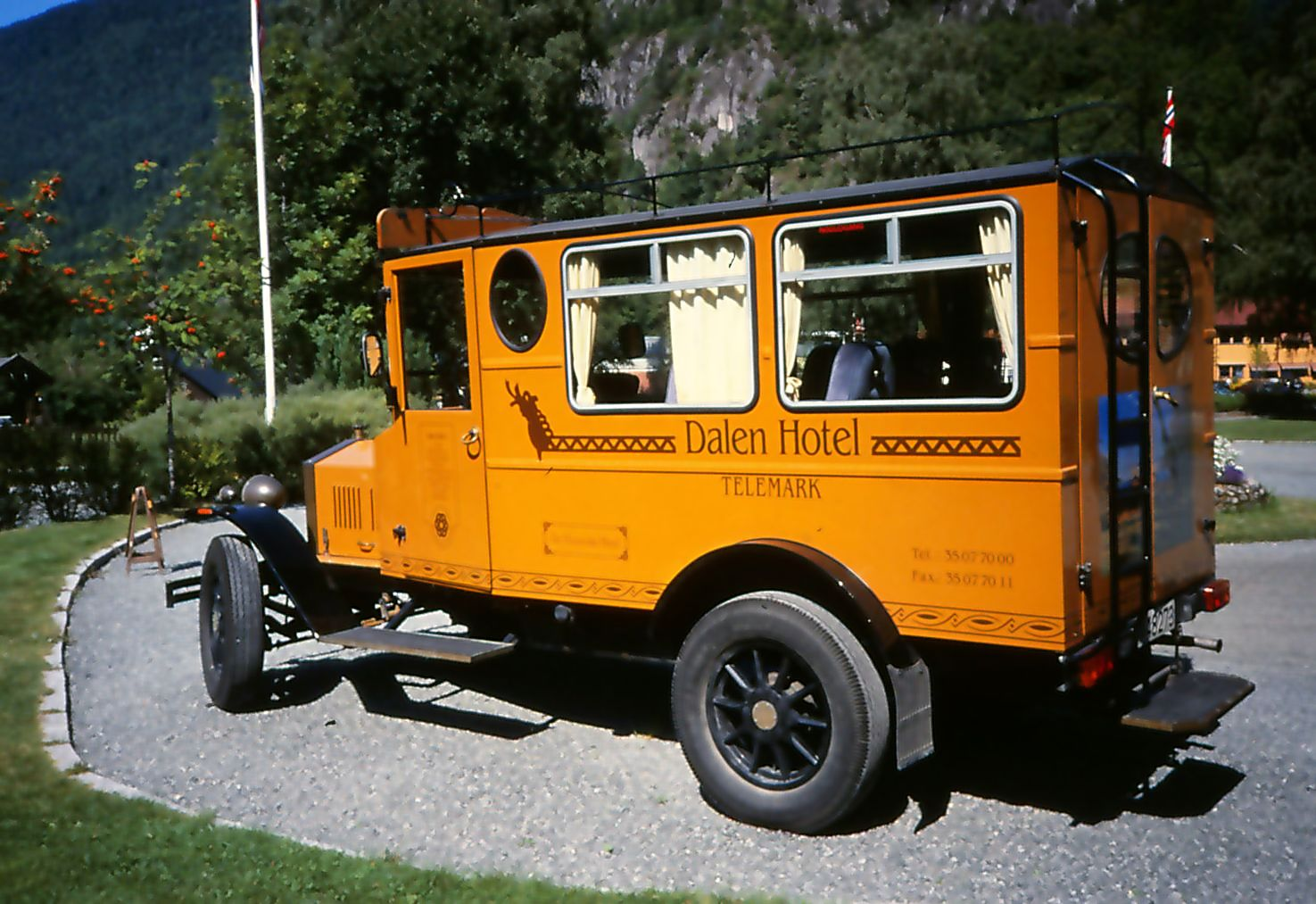
Dalen Hotel van still in use

The idea for a hotel in Dalen came with the expansion of the Telemark Canal in 1892. Through a series of staircase locks, the canal from Skien to Norsjø was extended to reach Bandak, with the small town of Dalen as its new endpoint. The canal was referred to as the "eighth wonder" upon its completion, and the waterway saw heavy traffic from ferries bringing passengers from the east in Oslo and Grenland travelling towards destinations in central and western Norway.

The initiative to build a luxury hotel in Dalen was taken by Skien businessman Hans Larsen along with his two associates, merchants Lars Rød and Anton Hansen from Skien and Porsgrunn respectively. The men commissioned local Porsgrunn architect Haldor Larsen Børve to design the hotel. Børve, originally from Ullensvang Municipality, was a highly trained architect, having studied at universities in Trondheim and later Hannover in Germany. After its opening in 1894, the hotel drew royal guests from all over Europe, playing host to the likes of King Oscar II of Sweden, Kaiser Wilhelm II of Germany, King Leopold II of Belgium, King Haakon VII of Norway and his family, and several members of the British aristocracy.

During the German occupation of Norway in World War II, Dalen Hotel was used as a resort for German officers. Most of the building's interior was stripped out and sold for parts, and the building fell into disrepair due to lack of proper maintenance. After the war, the building was bought by singer and evangelist Aage Samuelsen with the intent of restoring the hotel to its former glory. Though Samuelsen failed to raise the necessary funds to renovate the building, he gave the hotel significant press exposure, and towards the end of the 1980s restoration efforts began in earnest. The hotel was reopened once the remodelling finished in 1992. In 2000, the hotel was honored with the Europa Nostra award for outstanding conservation.

== Architecture ==
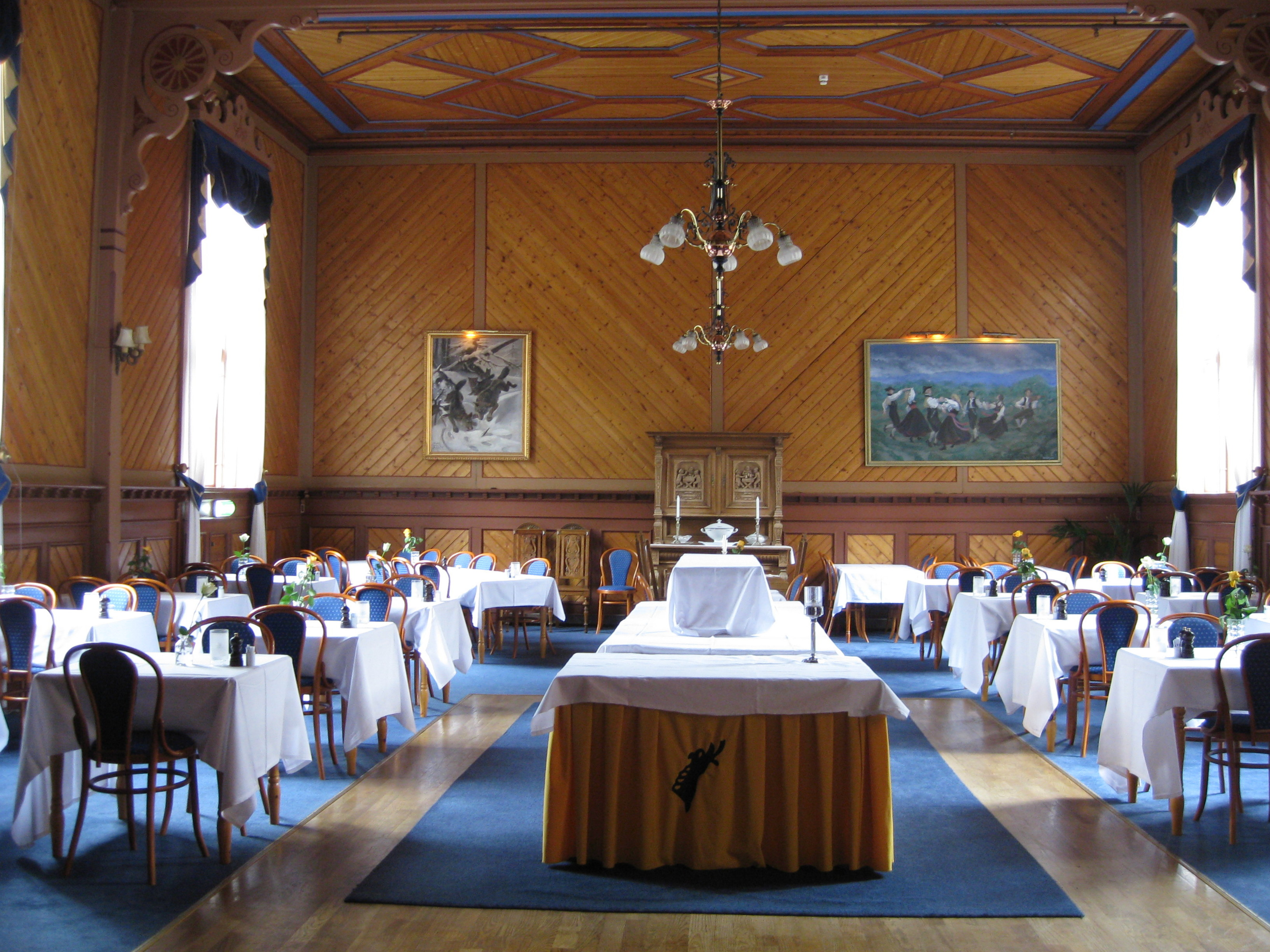
Dalen Hotel restaurant

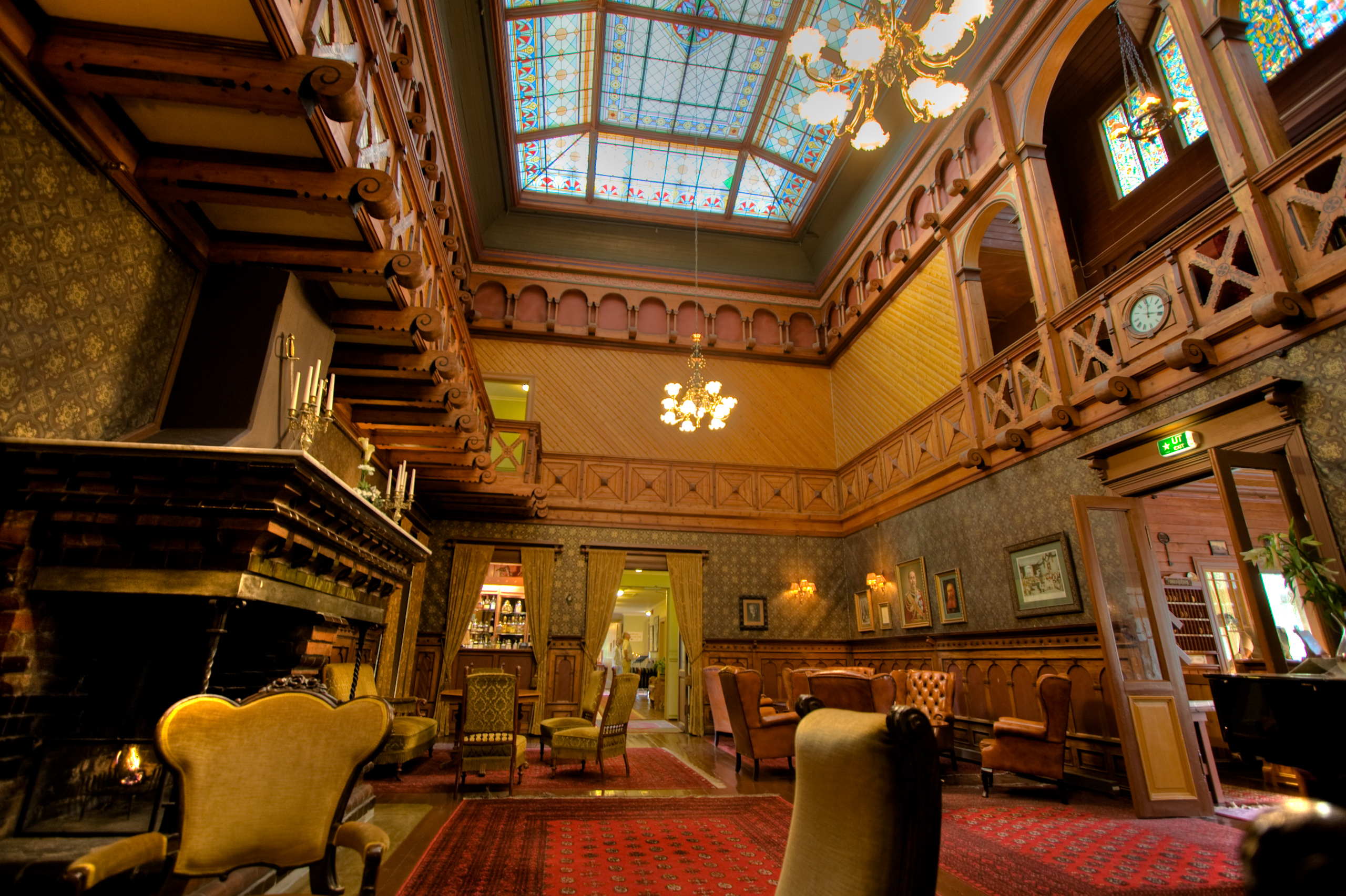
Dalen Hotel main lobby, including the stained glass skylight

The hotel, designed by architect Haldor Larsen Børve, was built in the style of a Swiss chalet with elements of National Romanticism and Dragestil. Børve was a German-trained architect well versed in Germanic and Scandinavian tradition, and the result is a distinctive blend of architectural styles in the building's complex carpentry work, dotted with elaborate eaves, cornices, turrets, and spires, and traditional Norse motifs such as dragon heads protruding from its gables.

The expansive building, covering almost 4,500 m^{2} (48,000 ft^{2}), is often described as having 2 1/2 stories, since the building has two floors except for a taller area in the center and two lofts on either end. The building has a completely symmetrical floor plan, including the two ornate towers in the center and the two wings that extend out from the main lobby. The center of the building is dominated by a grand hall which spans all three floors. The hotel's facade, lounges, dining room, and main lobby are almost identical to how they looked upon the building's completion in 1894, including the original stained glass in the lobby's skylight, which was imported from Berlin. The building's 42 hotel rooms are also very similar to their 1894 counterparts, but the bathrooms were renovated in 2007 to meet modern sanitation standards. The hotel is surrounded by nearly 30 decares (30,000 m^{2}) of manicured gardens that extend eastwards toward Bandak lake.
