= Langangen Church =

Church in Telemark, Norway

- Langangen kirke
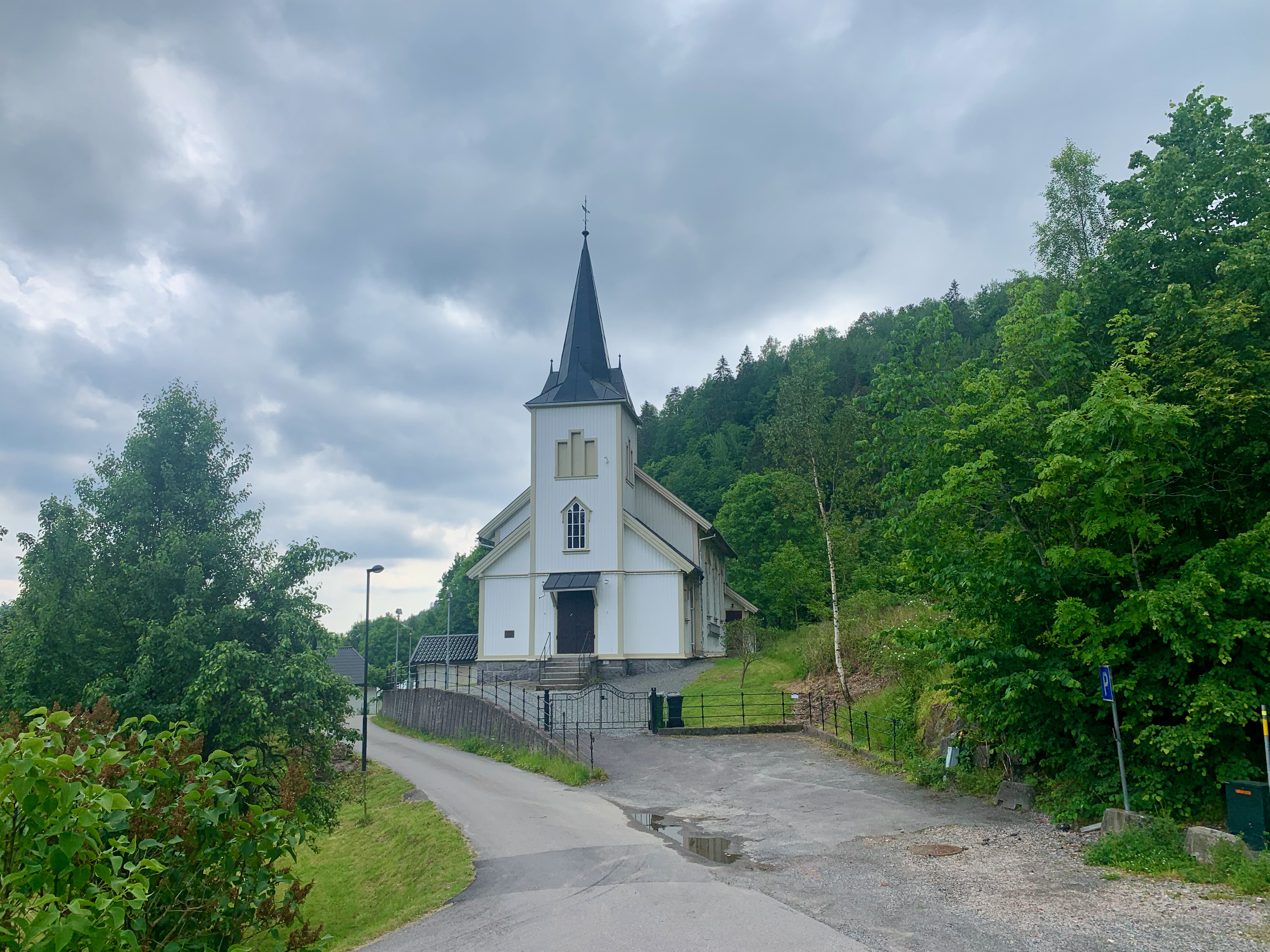
- View of the church
- Langangen Church
- 59°05′25″N 9°47′35″E
- Location: Porsgrunn Municipality, Telemark
- Country: Norway
- Denomination: Church of Norway
- Churchmanship: Evangelical Lutheran

History
- Former name: Langangen kapell
- Status: Parish church
- Founded: 1891
- Consecrated: 23 March 1891

Architecture
- Functional status: Active
- Architect: Haldor Børve
- Architectural type: Long church
- Completed: 1891 (135 years ago)

Specifications
- Capacity: 150
- Materials: Wood

Administration
- Diocese: Agder og Telemark
- Deanery: Skien prosti
- Parish: Eidanger
- Norwegian Cultural Heritage Site
- Type: Church
- Status: Listed
- ID: 84895

Langangen Church (Norwegian: Langangen kirke) is a parish church of the Church of Norway in Porsgrunn Municipality in Telemark county, Norway. It is located in the village of Langangen. It is one of the churches for the Eidanger parish which is part of the Skien prosti (deanery) in the Diocese of Agder og Telemark. The white, wooden church was built in a long church design in 1891 using plans drawn up by the architect Haldor Larsen Børve. The church seats about 150 people.

== History ==
Historically, Langangen was quite isolated and the road to Eidanger Church was long. There was a desire among the local population for their own church. In the late-1800s, the family of the late shipowner Christen Knudsen provided funds for the construction of an annex chapel in exchange for the municipality agreeing to be responsible for its ongoing maintenance. The municipality agreed and land from the Nedre Kokkersvold farm was given free of charge for the use of the new chapel. The site is located on a hill in the countryside with a great view over the fjord. The new Langangen Chapel was designed by Haldor Børve. It was one of his first churches that he designed (he went on to design a number of other churches in Telemark and elsewhere). The chapel was built in 1890-1891. Langangen Chapel was designed as a neo-Gothic wooden long church with around 150 seats. The structure is classical with a bell tower at the entrance with a church porch at the foot of the tower and surrounded by a stairwell, a rectangular nave, and a smaller, rectangular choir with a sacristy next to it. The new building was consecrated on 23 March 1891. During the 1960s, the church structure was compromised by old house borer beetles which were eating away the wooden structure, to the degree that they considered tearing down the church and rebuilding. Instead, they opted to repair the building which was completed by 1968. Later, the chapel was upgraded to the status of parish church and it was re-titled as Langangen Church.

== Media gallery ==
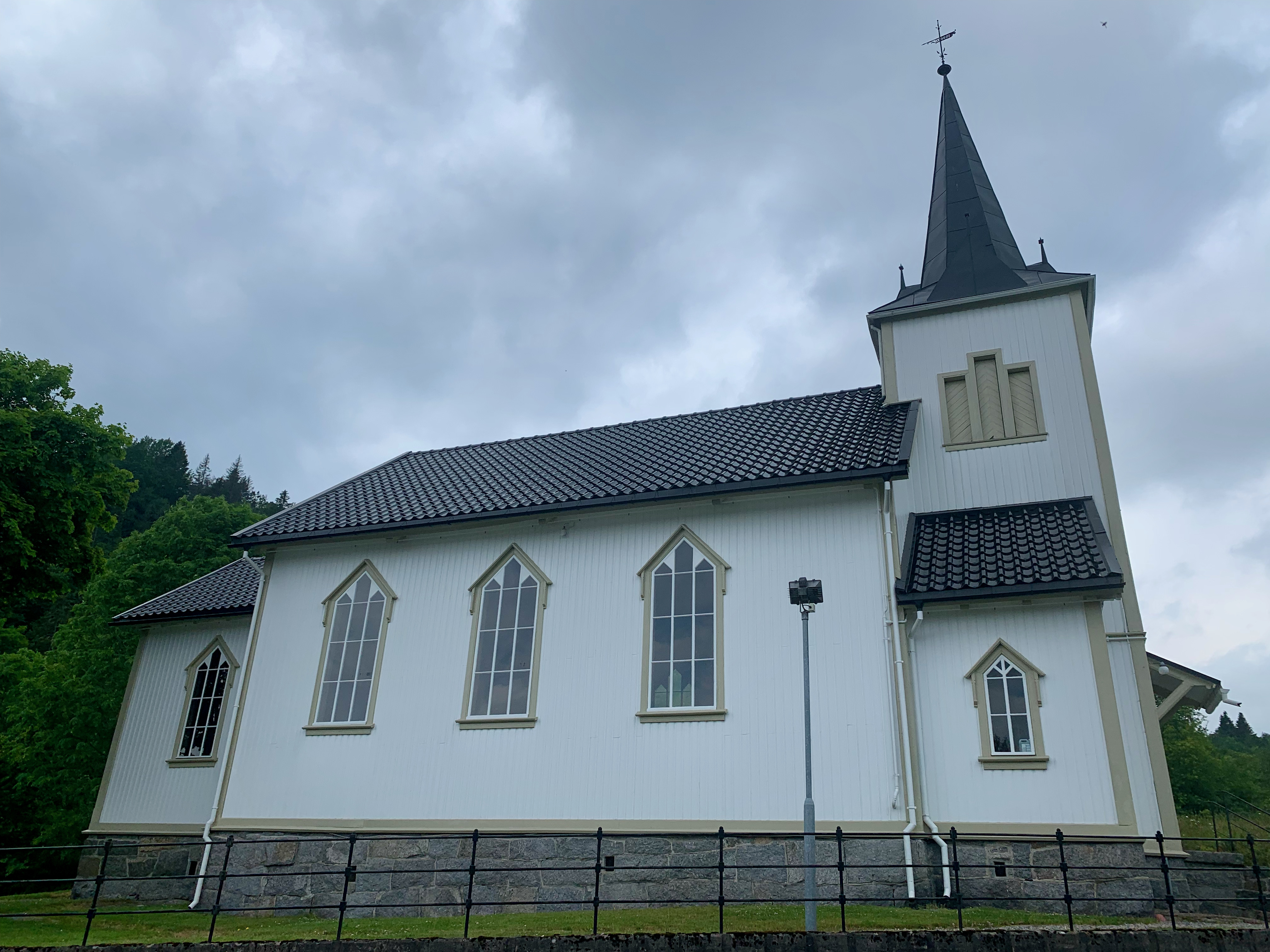

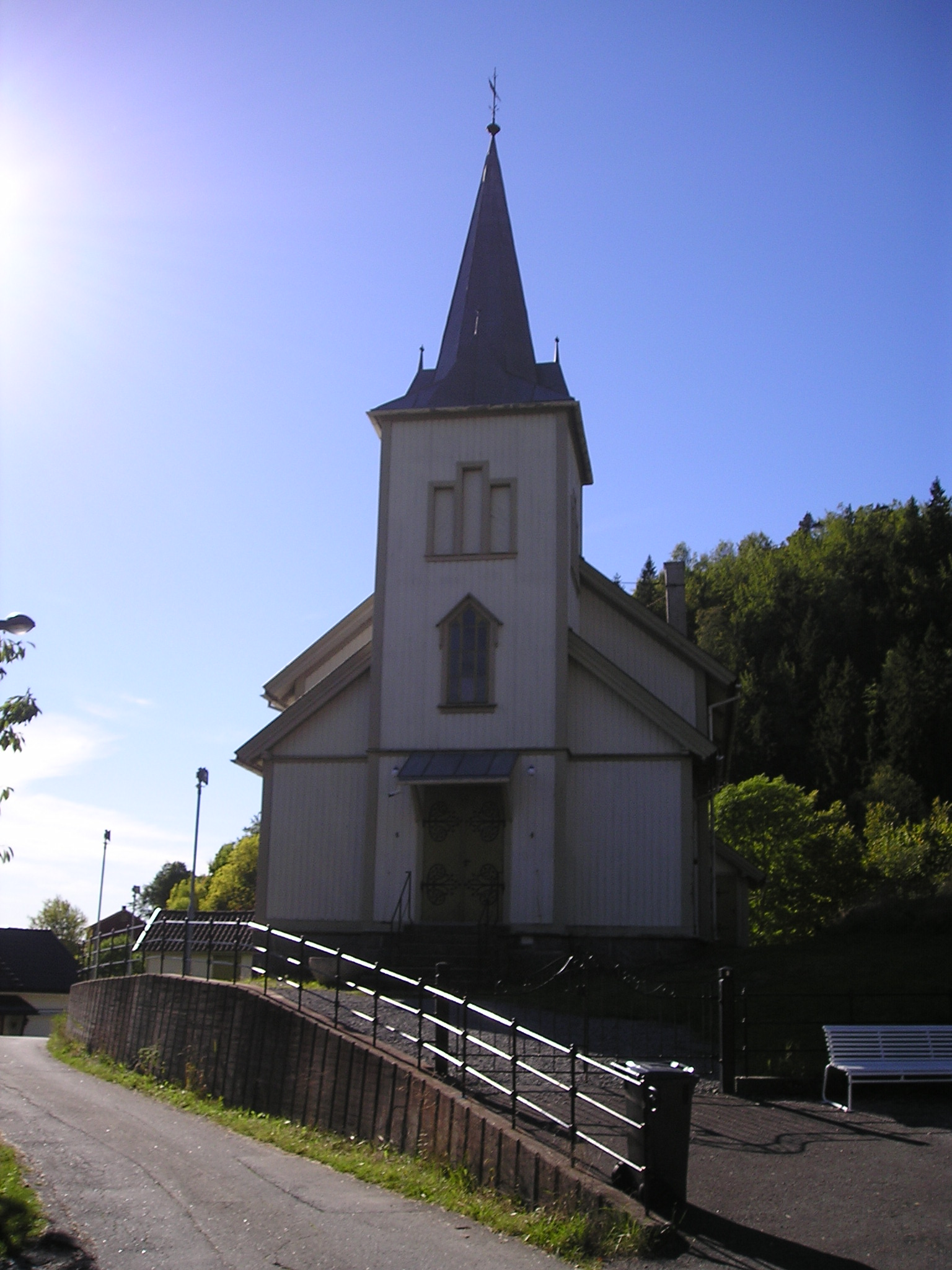

== See also ==
- List of churches in Agder og Telemark
