= Langangen =

Village in Porsgrunn Municipality, Norway

- Village
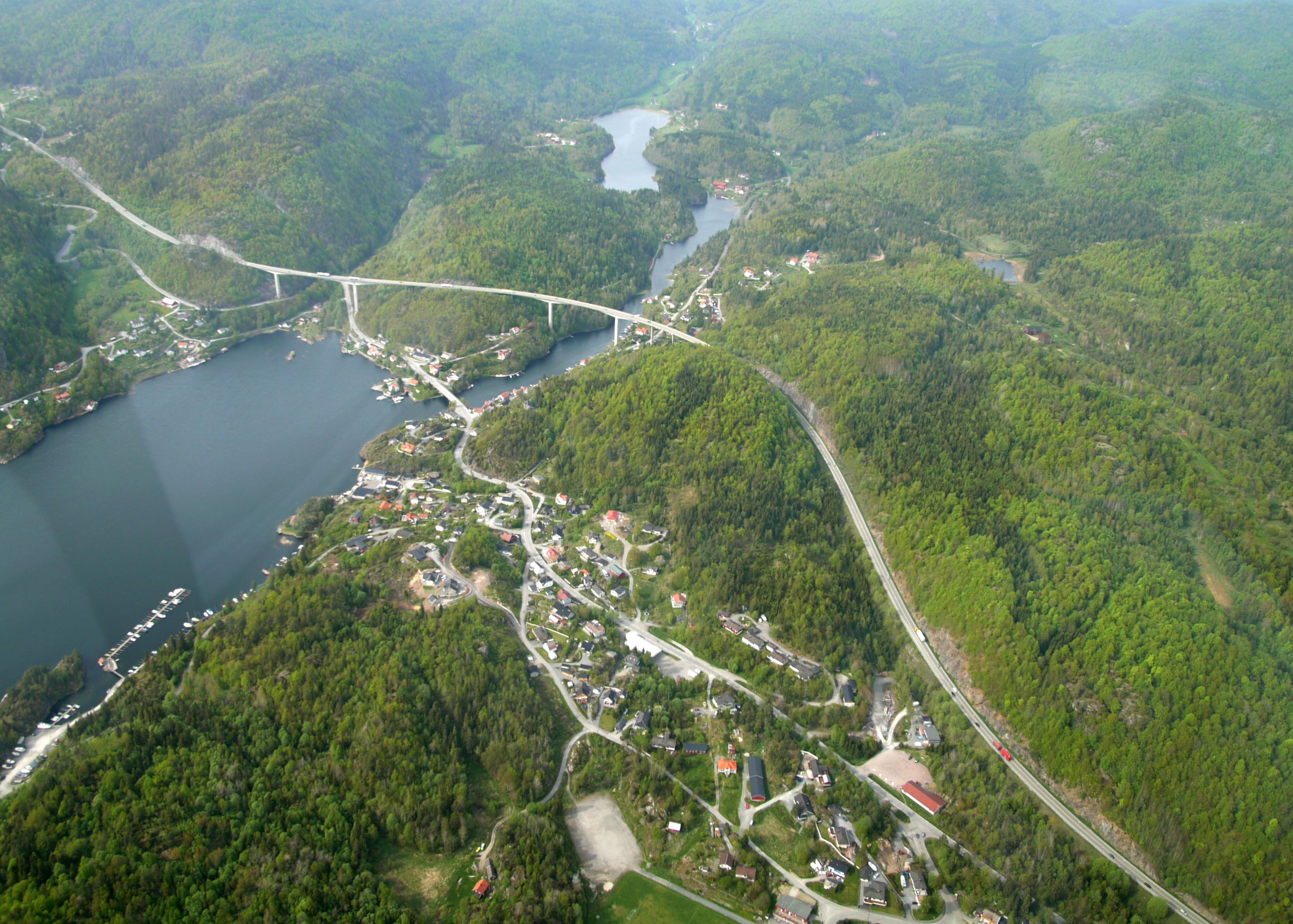
- Aerial view of the village
- Interactive map of Langangen
- Coordinates: 59.08769°N 9.8046°E
- Country: Norway
- Region: Eastern Norway
- County: Telemark
- District: Grenland
- Municipality: Porsgrunn Municipality

Area
  - Total: 0.45 km^{2} (0.17 sq mi)
- Elevation: 26 m (85 ft)

Population (2025)
  - Total: 470
  - Density: 1,044/km^{2} (2,700/sq mi)
- Time zone: UTC+01:00 (CET)
  - Summer (DST): UTC+02:00 (CEST)
- Post Code: 3947 Langangen

Langangen is a village in Porsgrunn Municipality in Telemark county, Norway. The village is located in the far eastern part of the municipality, just before the border with neighboring Larvik Municipality, about 10 kilometres (6.2 mi) to the southeast of the town of Porsgrunn. Langangen has its own elementary school and Langangen Church.

The 0.45-square-kilometre (110-acre) village has a population (2025) of 470 and a population density of 1,044 inhabitants per square kilometre (2,700/sq mi).

The European route E18 highway historically passed through the middle of the village, but in 1979 the road was re-routed over a new Langangen bridge further to the north.
