= Dragestil =

Style of design and architecture in Norway

Dragestil (lit. 'Dragon Style') is a style of design and architecture that originated in Norway and was widely used principally between 1880 and 1910. It is a variant of the more embracing National Romantic style and an expression of Norwegian romantic nationalism.

== History ==
The foremost sources of inspiration for the Dragestil style were the Viking and medieval art and architecture of Scandinavia. It had roots in the preservation of stave churches and the recent excavation of historic relics such as the Tune, Gokstad and Oseberg ships.

It often featured Norse motifs, such as serpents and dragons, hence its popular appellation. Important proponents in the modern era included Norwegian architects Holm Hansen Munthe and Balthazar Lange.

In Germany, the Kongsnæs' Sailors Station in Potsdam and the Rominten Hunting Lodge were erected for Kaiser Wilhelm II.

== Characteristic features ==
- Exposed timber walls, often tarred on the exterior with varnished interiors
- Decoration in the form of dragon heads
- Often steep roofs and big eaves

== Gallery ==
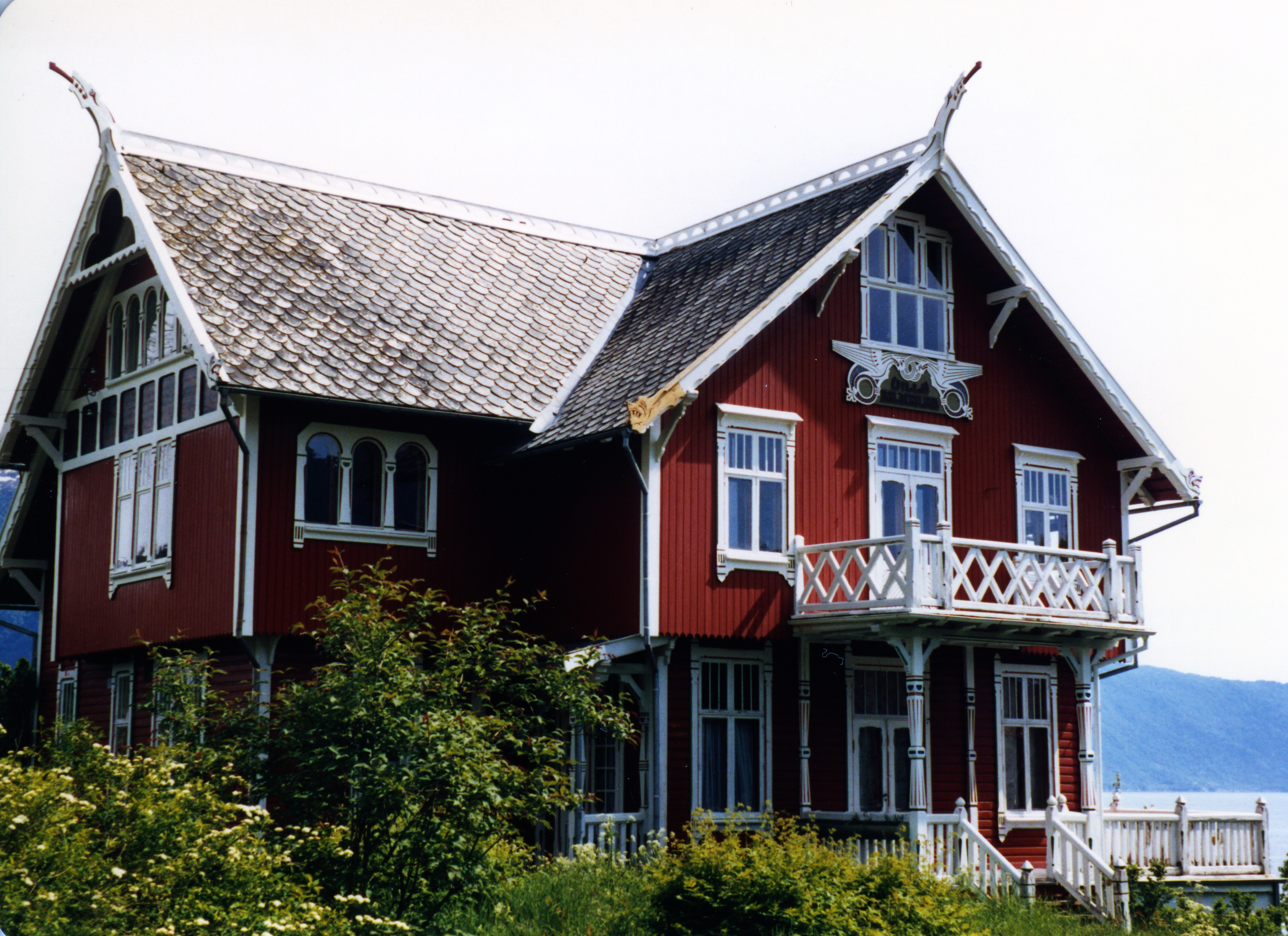
Villa Balderslund in Balestrand (erected 1907)

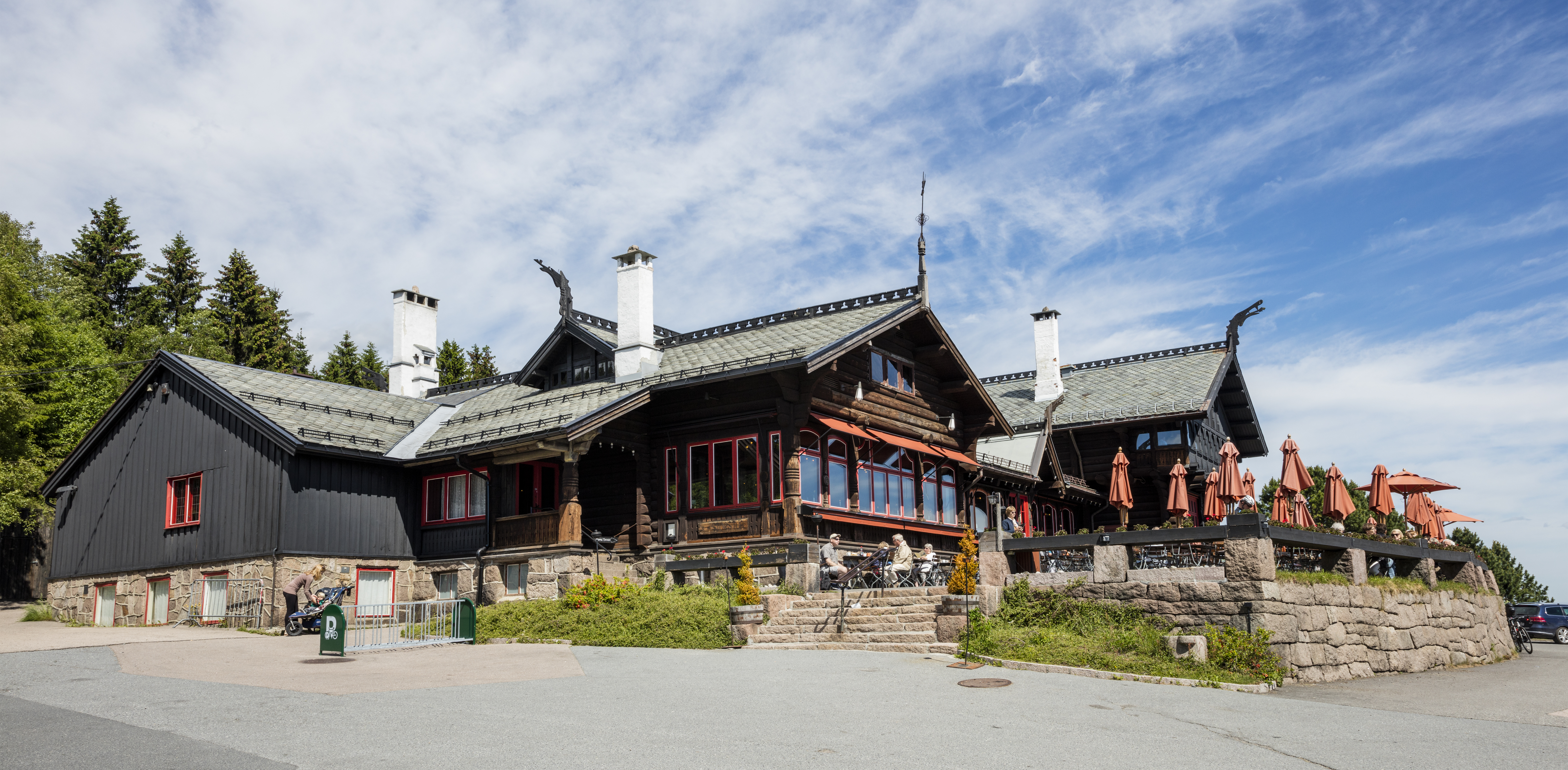
Frognerseteren restaurant in Oslo (erected 1890–1891)

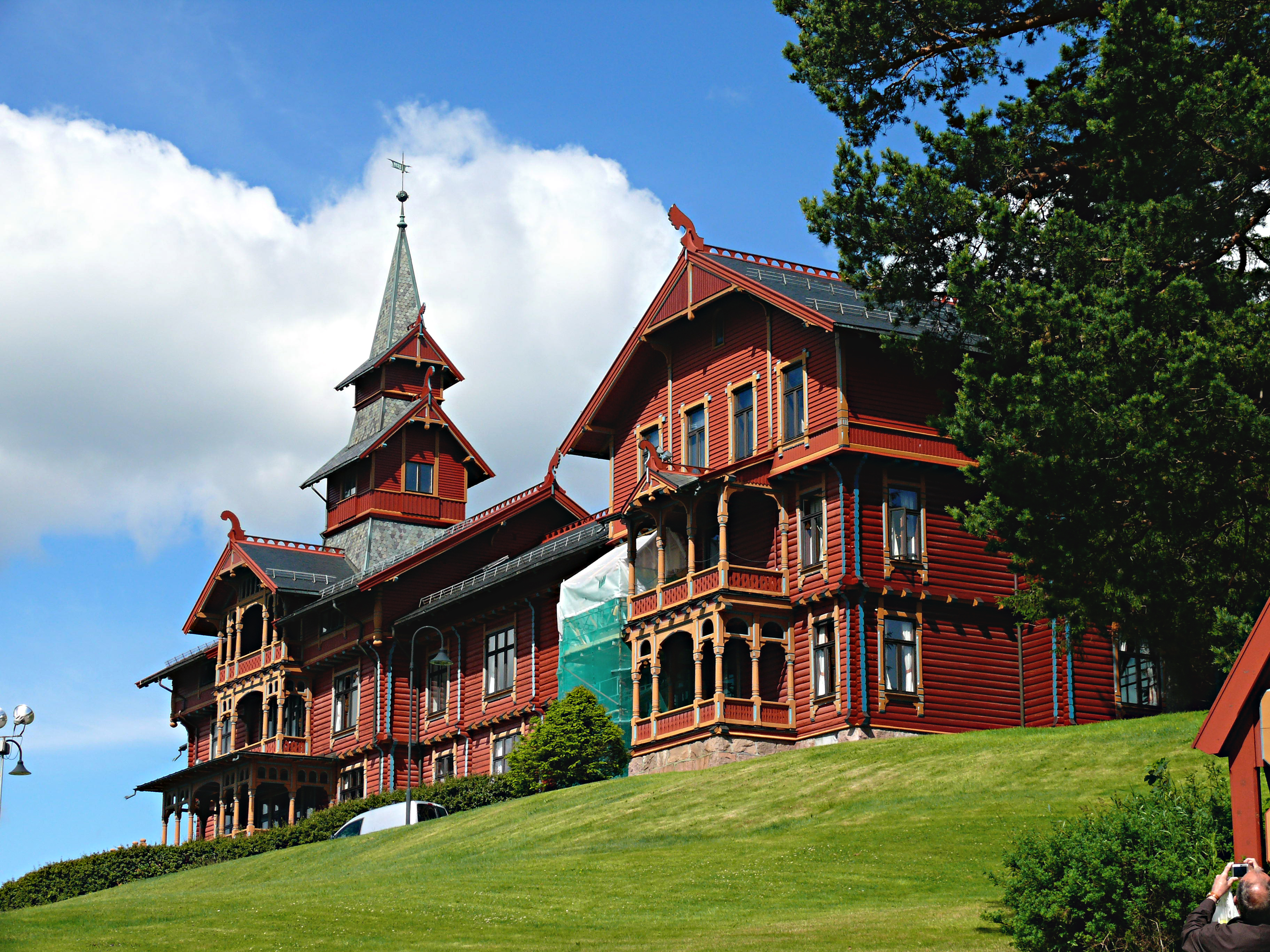
Scandic Holmenkollen Park Hotel in Oslo (1894)

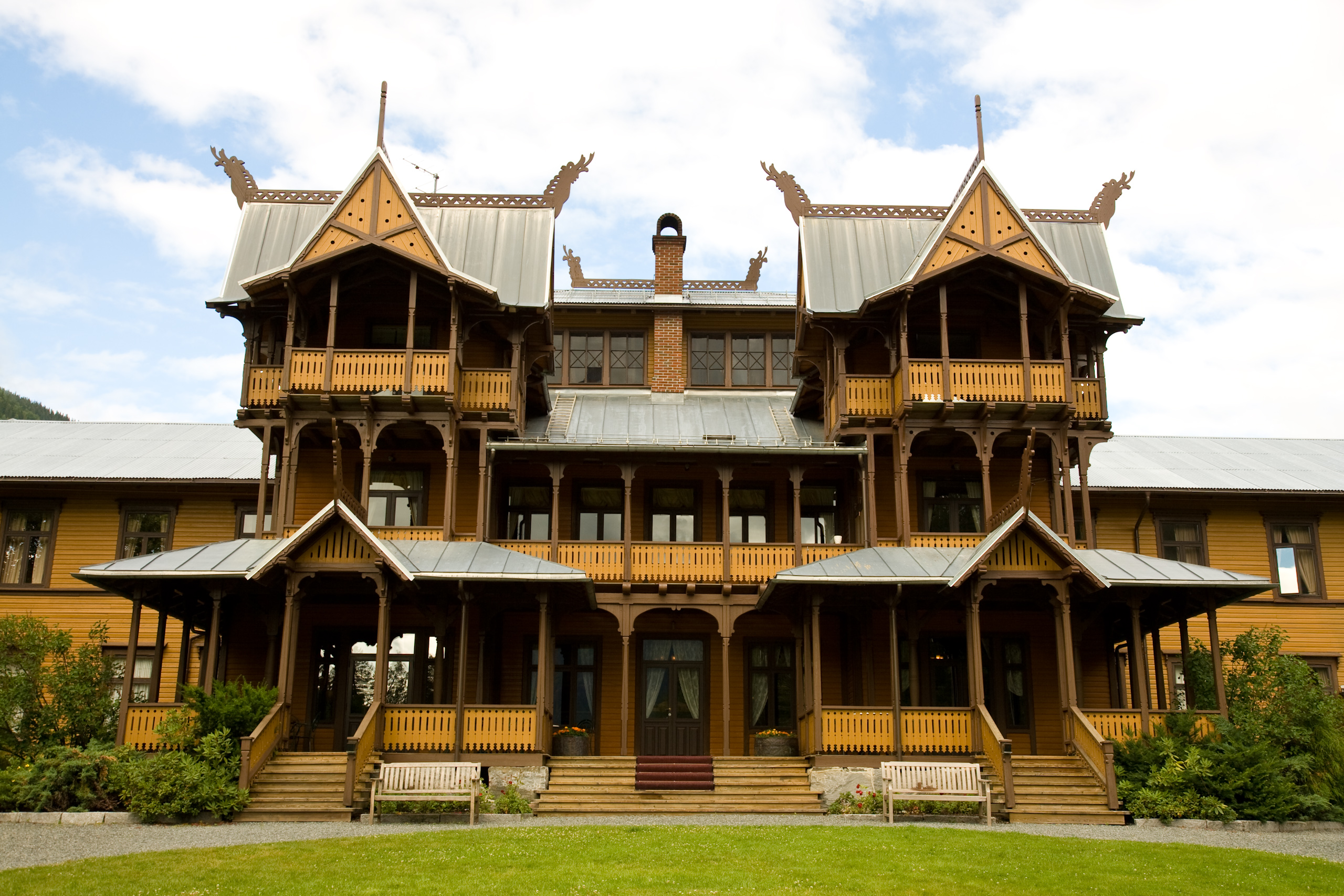
Dalen Hotel in Kviteseid Municipality

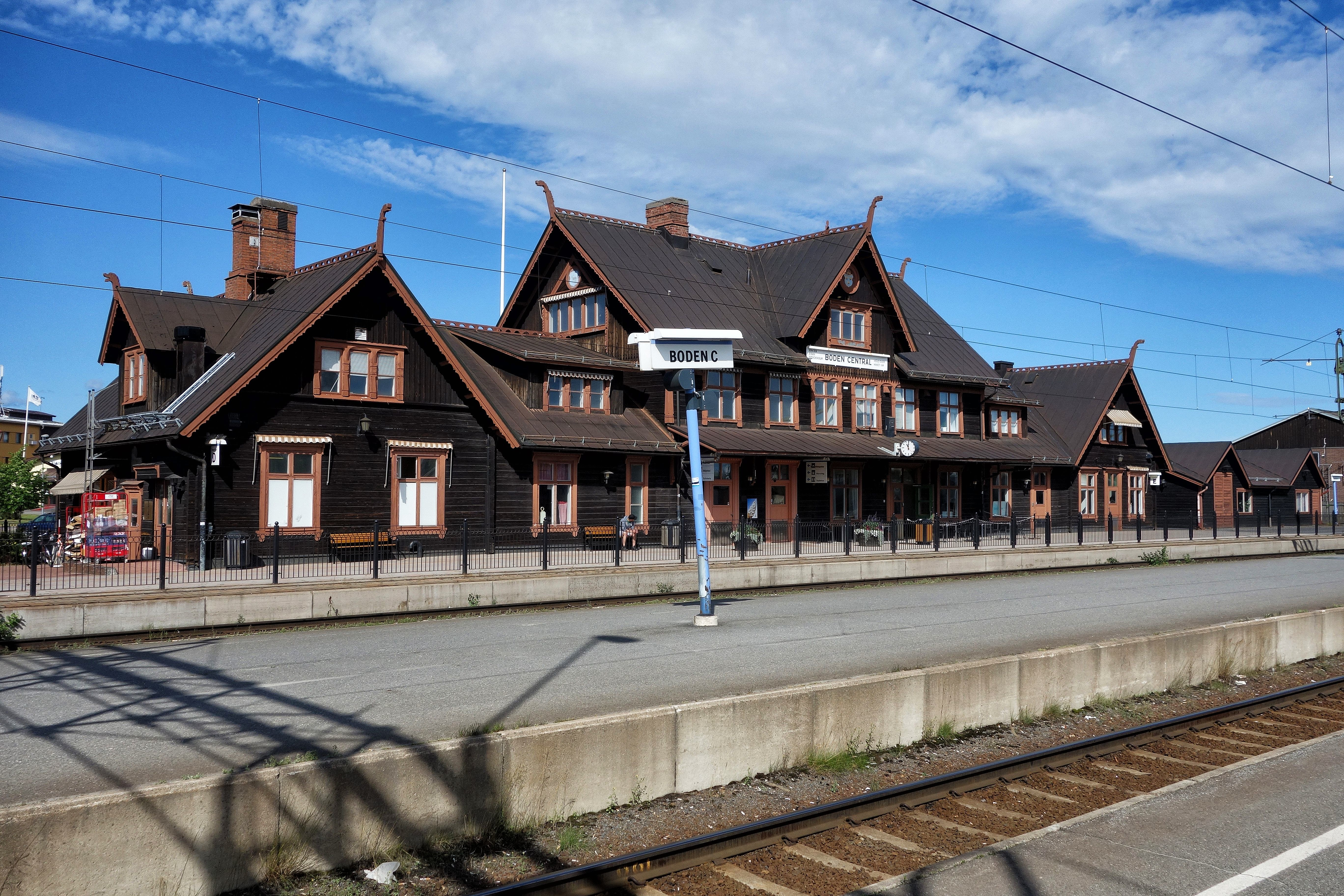
Boden Central Station

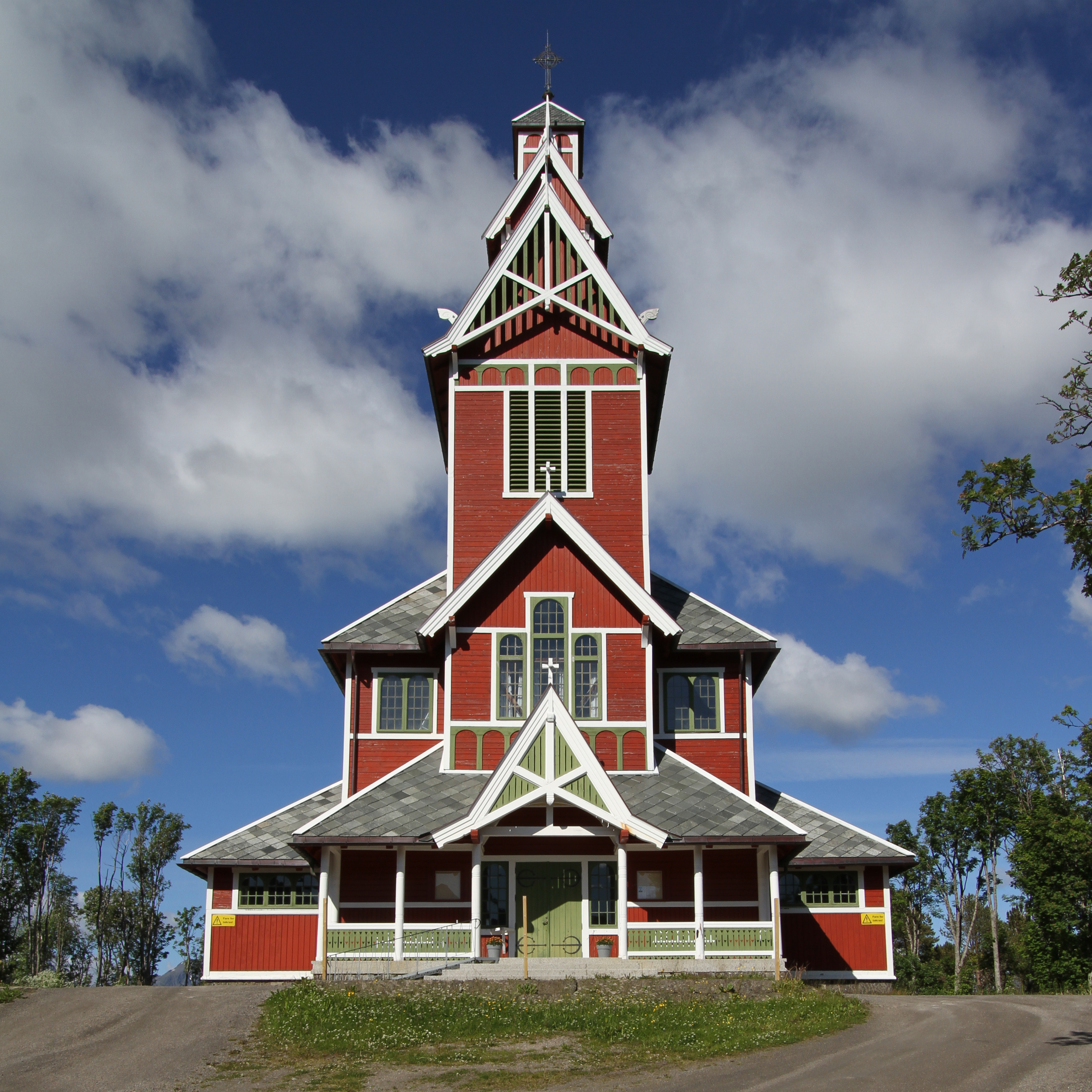
Buksnes Church in Vestvågøy Municipality, Norway

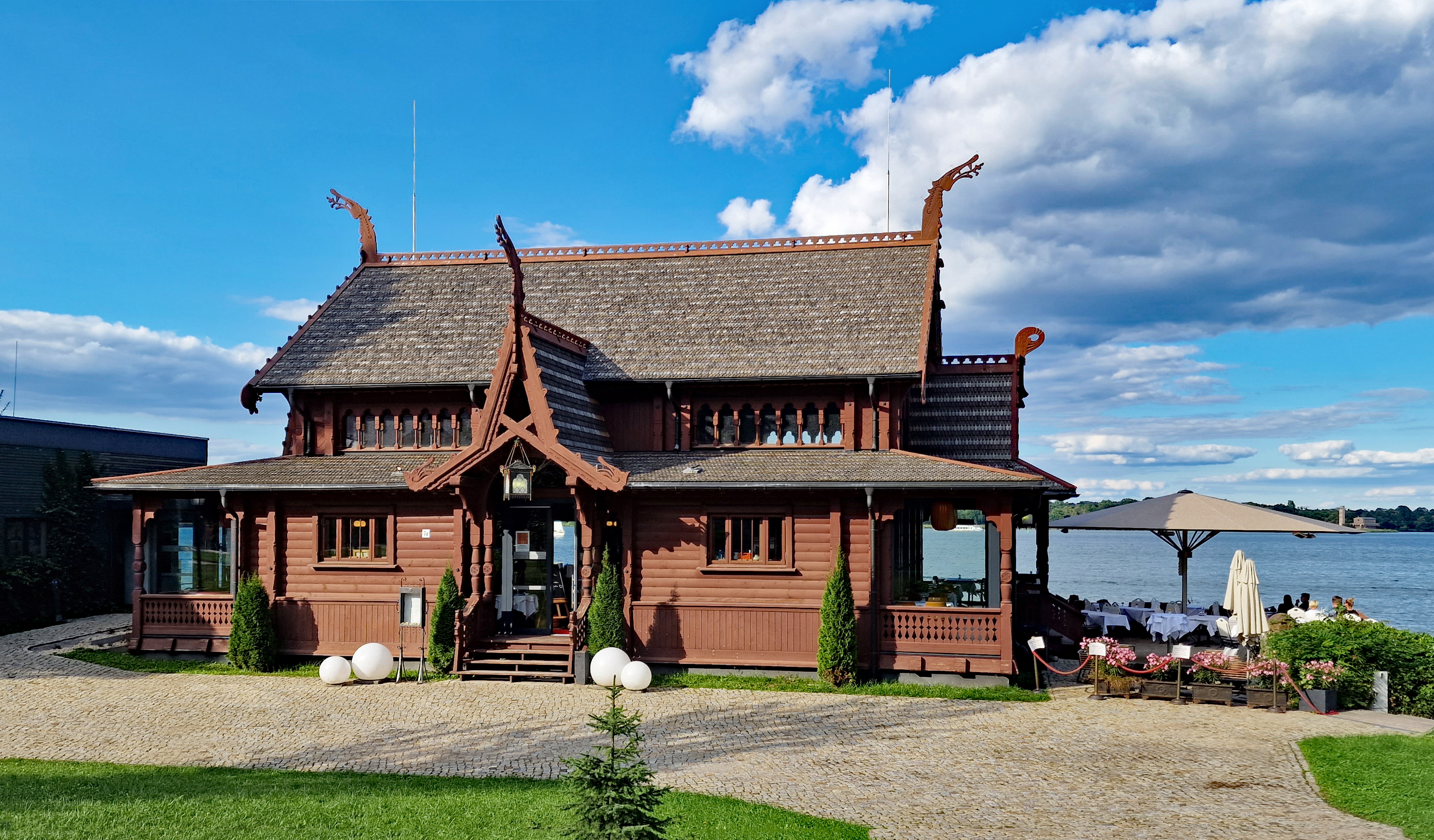
Matrosenstation Kongsnaes in Potsdam

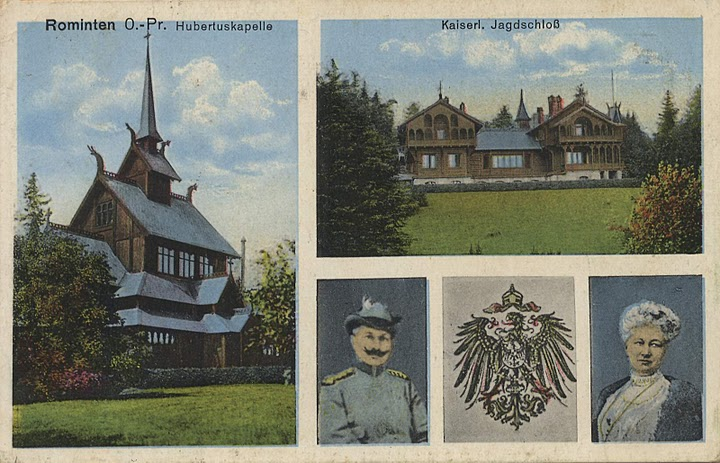
Rominten church and hunting lodge

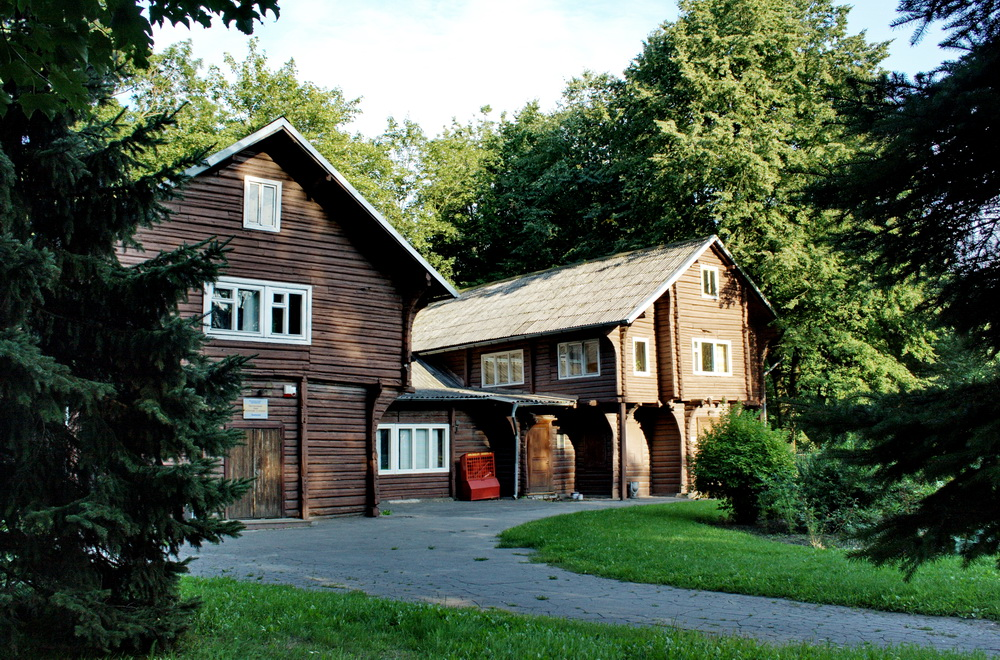
Former Rominten hunting lodge transferred to Kaliningrad's Central Park

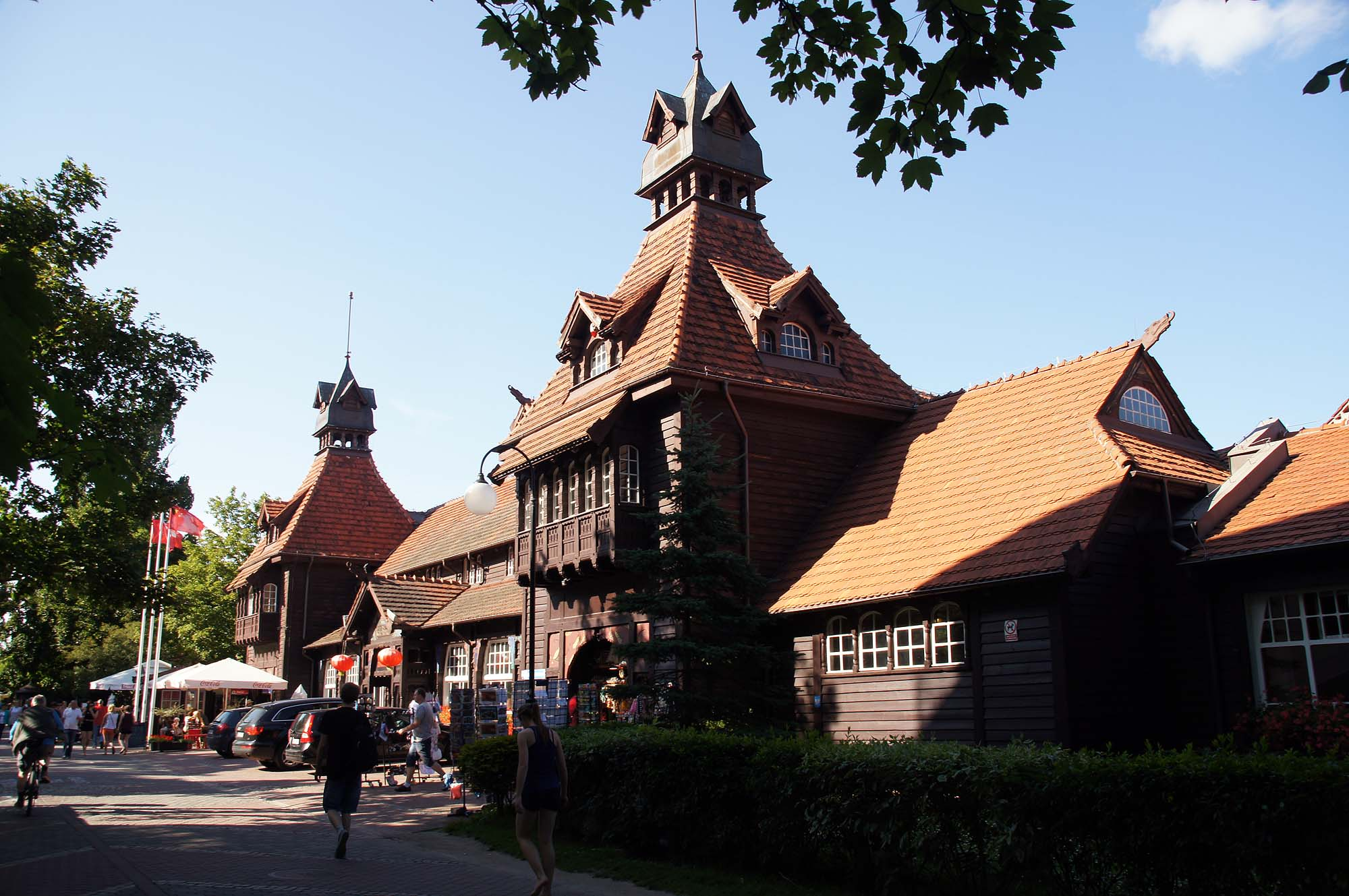
Southern baths (Łazienki Południowe) in Sopot

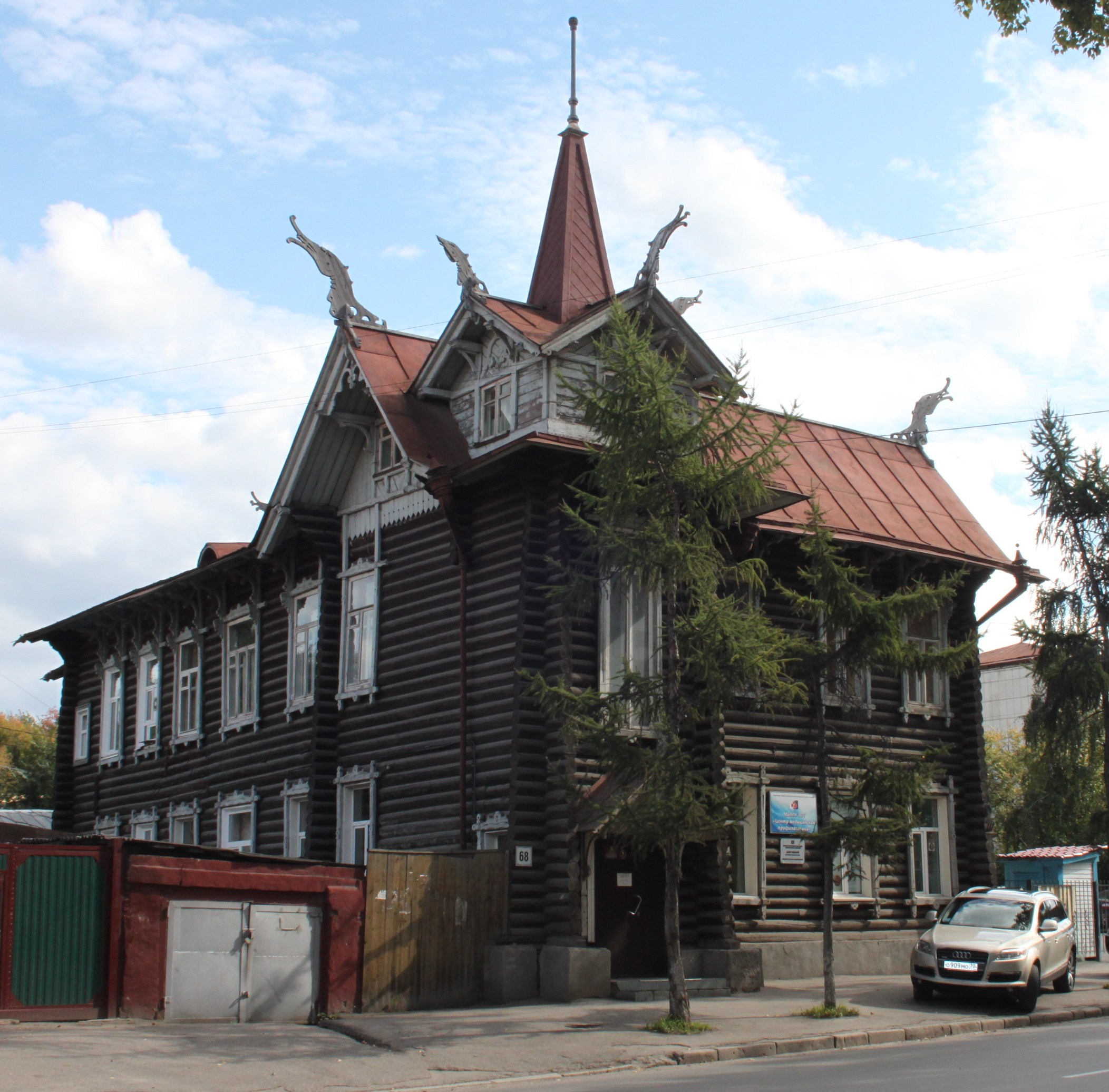
"The House with dragons" in Tomsk, Siberia, Russia

== Other sources ==
- Tschudi-Madsen, Stephan (1981). Veien hjem, Norsk arkitektur 1870–1914 (in Norwegian). Oslo: Norges kunsthistorie. ISBN 82-05-12269-5.
- Tschudi-Madsen, Stephan (1993). Dragestilen (in Norwegian). Oslo: Honnør til en hånet stil. ISBN 82-03-22009-6.
- Tschudi-Madsen, Stephan (1993). Vandringer på en utstilling og i en jaktvilla (in Norwegian). Oslo: Honnør til en hånet stil. ISBN 82-03-22009-6.
