= Thobias Petter Wiibe =

Norwegian businessman and politician

Thobias Petter Wiibe (1815–1891) was a Norwegian businessperson and politician.

== Personal life ==
He was born in 1815 as the son of sexton and teacher Fredrik Georg Wiibe.

Thobias Petter Wiibe married Anette Fredrikke Bendixen (1820–1857) in 1848. She was the daughter of Frantz Bendixen (1782–1847) and Anne Clausdatter (1783–1836), from Porsgrund. The couple had one daughter, Anna Fredrikke Wiibe. She was born in 1850, married factory owner Anders G. A. Hals and moved to Kristiania.

== Career ==
Thobias Petter Wiibe grew up in Skien. He started his career as a shipmaster, but in 1840 he was hired in the company M. T. Mathiesens Enke & Søn of Niels Mathiesen in Porsgrund. He became a merchant of his own in 1851, and was also a ship-owner, owning six ships.

He was elected mayor of Porsgrund municipality for the year 1854, and also held this position in 1856, 1858 and 1859, with Simon Karenius Høegh and Jørgen Aall Flood in between. Wiibe was vice mayor in 1850, 1853 and 1860.

From this point he worked as city treasurer. He was also a member of the board of directors of the local savings bank, sitting as board chairman for a total of nine years.
