= Jørgen Aall Flood =

Norwegian businessman and politician (1820–1892)

Jørgen Aall Flood (1820–1892) was a Norwegian politician, vice consul and businessman.

== Personal life ==
Jørgen Aall Flood was born in 1820 as the first child of merchant Jørgen Flood (1792–1867) and his wife Hanna (1796–1863), née Aall. As such his maternal grandfather was Constitutional founding father Jørgen Aall. He later got four sisters and two brothers; the family grew up in Eidanger.

He married Anna Cathrine (1825–1886), née Bæhr. The couple had eight children.

== Career ==
He started as a trainee in the merchant company J. & E. M. Flood, which was run by his father Jørgen and uncle Elias. From the latter he inherited the property Nedre Borge, where he lived until 1866. He sold the property that year, as the company went bankrupt in 1865. The company's remaining assets were repossessed by the local government.

However, in 1861 he had taken over as director of Den første norske Assuranceforening, an association for marine insurance. He was brought in as a new face following the 1860 turbulence in the organization: Hans Eleonardus and Hans Møller, who formerly had cooperated within the association with the nephew of Jørgen Aall Flood's grandfather, left to form a rivaling insurance company. Jørgen Aall Flood was also He was also vice consul for Denmark.

As a politician, Jørgen Aall Flood was elected mayor of Porsgrund municipality in 1857, and returned to serve in the year 1860. He also served as vice mayor, in 1859. His father Jørgen and his uncle Paulus were both former mayors.
