= Peter Bøyesen =

Norwegian businessman and politician

Mayor of Porsgrund municipality
- In office 1843–1843
- In office 1844–1844
- In office 1846–1846

Member of Parliament
- In office 1845–1845
- In office 1854–1854
- In office 1859–1860

Personal details
- Born: 13 January 1799
- Died: 24 November 1867 (aged 68)
- Party: Independent
- Occupation: Businessperson

Peter Johan Bøyesen (13 January 1799 – 24 November 1867) was a Norwegian businessperson and politician.

== Personal life ==
Peter Johan Bøyesen was born in Western Porsgrund 1799 as the son of shipmaster and boat pilot Peter Bøye Larsen.

One of his sons, named Peter, became a shipbuilder.

== Career ==
Bøyesen started his career as a shipmaster and trader. He had been a trainee with Hans Eleonardus Møller, Sr. at an early age, from 1813, and then bought his first ship in 1818, sailing from Porsgrund to Copenhagen. Timber and iron were traded for grain. While losing the ship at sea, he replaced it by investing in new ships. The trade routes were later expanded to the Baltic Sea. In 1834 he acquired burghership, and expanded his business as a grain and timber merchant and ship-owner.

Bøyesen was active in the local community. First, he was a benefactor for the literary circle Porsgrunds Læseselskab, founded by Jens Gasmann in 1833. For the purpose of general enlightenment, Bøyesen founded the Henrik Wergelands Almuebogsamling, a public library. Of the latter organization he was the first chairman of the board. He was a board member of the first temperance society in Porsgrund, named the Porsgrunds Forening mod Brændevins-Drik, founded in December 1845 with former mayor Ole Hersted Schjøtt as chairman. He was also a founder and board member of the local seamen's society, one of the first of its kind in Norway.

In 1843 he proposed establishing the local savings bank. This, however, was done in the role of politician. Bøyesen was elected mayor of Porsgrund municipality for the years 1843, 1844 and 1846, having first been elected to the municipal council in 1842. Bøyesen was then elected to the Norwegian Parliament in 1845, 1854, 1857 and 1859/60, representing the constituency Porsgrund. In 1848 he had been elected deputy representative from the constituency Porsgrund og Brevig. In his political views, he was described by one historian as proto-Liberal Party (political parties did not exist until 1884), having been vocally supported by later Liberal Party founder and Prime Minister Johan Sverdrup in their common opposition of Conservative Anton Martin Schweigaard during the 1860 debate on the Merchant Shipping Act (Sjøfartsloven).

Bøyesen went bankrupt in July 1867, following general economic hardships. The city had seen only one bankruptcy in 1866, but 32 from 1868 to 1871. This depression was partially caused by the difficult transition from wooden to steam ships. Four months after his bankruptcy, Bøyesen died.
