= Hans Moller =

Hans Moller may refer to:

- Hans Møller (1830–1911), Norwegian politician, consul and businessman
- Hans Eleonardus Møller Sr. (1780–1860), Norwegian businessman
- Hans Moller (painter) (1905–2000), German-born American artist
