= Stridsklev Church =

Church in Telemark, Norway

- Stridsklev kirke
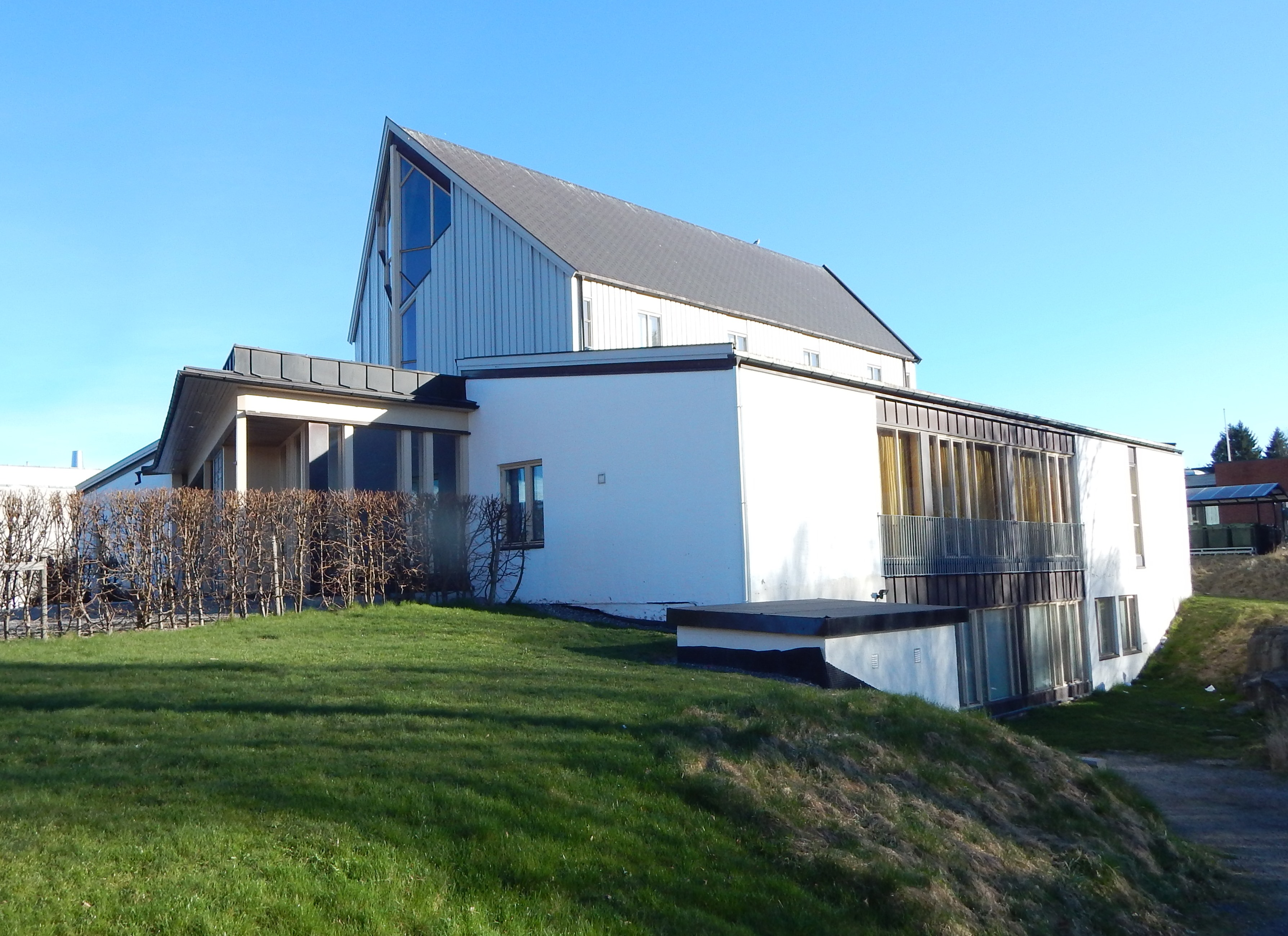
- View of the church
- Stridsklev Church
- 59°06′39″N 9°40′04″E
- Location: Porsgrunn Municipality, Telemark
- Country: Norway
- Denomination: Church of Norway
- Churchmanship: Evangelical Lutheran

History
- Status: Parish church
- Founded: 2000
- Consecrated: 3 December 2000

Architecture
- Functional status: Active
- Architect: Kåre Kverndokk
- Architectural type: Rectangular
- Completed: 2000 (26 years ago)

Specifications
- Capacity: 250
- Materials: Wood

Administration
- Diocese: Agder og Telemark
- Deanery: Skien prosti
- Parish: Eidanger

Stridsklev Church (Norwegian: Stridsklev kirke) is a parish church of the Church of Norway in Porsgrunn Municipality in Telemark county, Norway. It is located in the town of Porsgrunn. It is one of the churches for the Eidanger parish which is part of the Skien prosti (deanery) in the Diocese of Agder og Telemark. The white and gray, wooden church was built in a rectangular design in 2000 using plans drawn up by the architect Kåre Kverndokk. The church seats about 250 people.

== History ==
No new churches had been built in Porsgrunn since the 1960s, but the town had been growing since that time and there was a need for a new church. In 1995, the Christian Democratic Party did quite well in the local municipal elections, and that party joined the Labour Party and Socialist Left Party in governing after many years of those two parties governing alone. One of the points in their joint governing agreement was that a new church would be built in Stridsklev. The town provided 11 million kr in funding, with the residents of the area raising an addition 2 million kr. Kåre Kverndokk from the Børve Borchsenius architecture firm was hired to design the new church. The foundation stone was laid on 6 February 2000 by Bishop Olav Skjevesland. The church was consecrated on 3 December 2000, again, by Bishop Olav Skjevesland.

== See also ==
- List of churches in Agder og Telemark
