= Boyesen =

Boyesen is a surname. Notable people with the surname include:

- Gerda Boyesen (1922–2005), Norwegian psychologist
- Hjalmar Hjorth Boyesen (1848–1895), Norwegian-American author and college professor
- Jens Boyesen (1920–1996), Norwegian diplomat and politician
- Peter Bøyesen (1799–1867), Norwegian businessperson and politician
- Pietro Boyesen (1819–1882), Danish photographer
- Trygve Bøyesen (1886–1963), Norwegian gymnast
