= Yara Eyde =

MV Yara Eyde is a ship under construction, which will be the world's first container ship running on clean ammonia. It will travel between Oslo, Porsgrunn, Hamburg, and Bremerhaven, and is optimised for the commercial corridor between Norway and Germany. The vessel will be powered by pure ammonia as fuel and is scheduled to enter the market in 2026. NorthSea Container Line, a Norwegian container company, and ammonia manufacturer and shipowner Yara Clean Ammonia are developing the vessel. Specifically, the two intend to form a joint company called NCL Oslofjord AS in order to run the ship that runs on ammonia. The joint venture's goal upon founding is to be the first line operator in the world to concentrate only on ammonia-powered container ships. The ship is also planned to be fitted with a battery pack of 250 kWh and the option to connect to shore power. Yara Eyde will get ammonia from Yara Clean Ammonia that is carbon-neutral or almost carbon-free. A bunkering network is being developed in partnership with Azane Fuel Solutions to provide the access of pure ammonia in ports located in Norway and, eventually, Scandinavia. This network complies with Norway's offshore industry emissions reduction goals. The construction of the ship began in September 2025.
