= Herøya Church =

Church in Telemark, Norway

- Herøya kirke
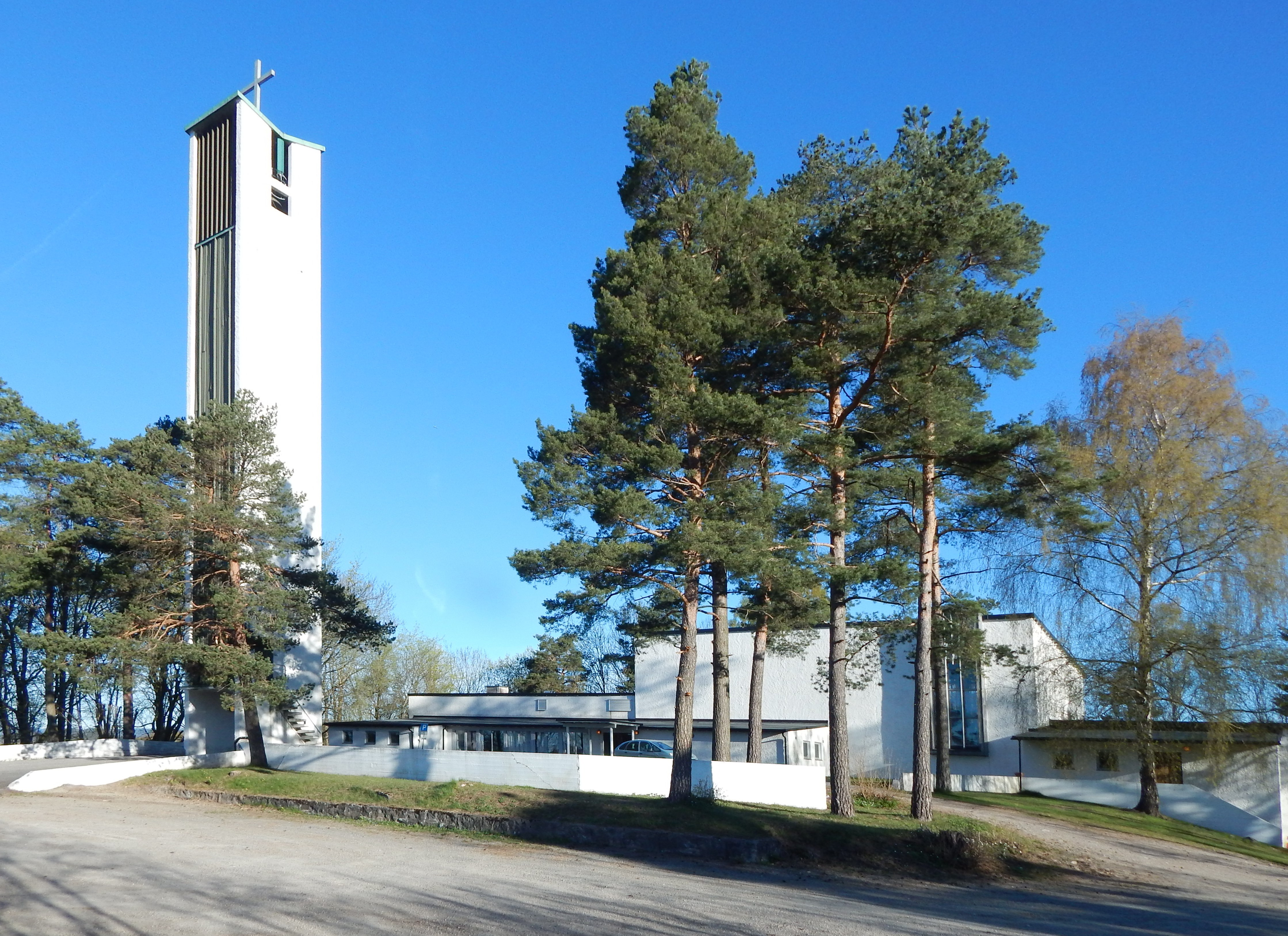
- View of the church
- Herøya Church
- 59°06′41″N 9°38′56″E
- Location: Porsgrunn Municipality, Telemark
- Country: Norway
- Denomination: Church of Norway
- Churchmanship: Evangelical Lutheran

History
- Status: Parish church
- Founded: 1957
- Consecrated: 27 August 1957

Architecture
- Functional status: Active
- Architect(s): Helge Abrahamsen and Hans Grinde
- Architectural type: Rectangular
- Completed: 1957 (69 years ago)

Specifications
- Capacity: 430
- Materials: Brick

Administration
- Diocese: Agder og Telemark
- Deanery: Skien prosti
- Parish: Eidanger
- Norwegian Cultural Heritage Site
- Type: Church
- Status: Not protected
- ID: 84566

Herøya Church (Norwegian: Herøya kirke) is a parish church of the Church of Norway in Porsgrunn Municipality in Telemark county, Norway. It is located on Herøya in the town of Porsgrunn. It is one of the churches for the Eidanger parish which is part of the Skien prosti (deanery) in the Diocese of Agder og Telemark. The brick church was built in a rectangular design in 1957 using plans drawn up by the architects Helge Abrahamsen and Hans Grinde. The church seats about 430 people, but can hold up to 700 people if the movable walls are changed to maximize seating in the main room.

== History ==
In 1928, Norsk Hydro opened a factory on Herøya and as part of the design of the area, the company including a place for a new church as part of the residential areas surrounding the factory. After World War II, there was a push to get the church built on Herøya. Norsk Hydro donated land for the church and contributed money towards the construction costs. The church was designed by Helge Abrahamsen and Hans Grinde. The new church was consecrated on 27 August 1957 by Bishop Johannes Smidt. The church is a modern design, built out of brick and concrete, and covered with white plaster on the outside. There is a free-standing bell tower near the main entrance to the church. The church was restored in 1988 and 1992.

== See also ==
- List of churches in Agder og Telemark
