= Porsgrunn (town) =

Town in Porsgrunn, Norway

- Town/City
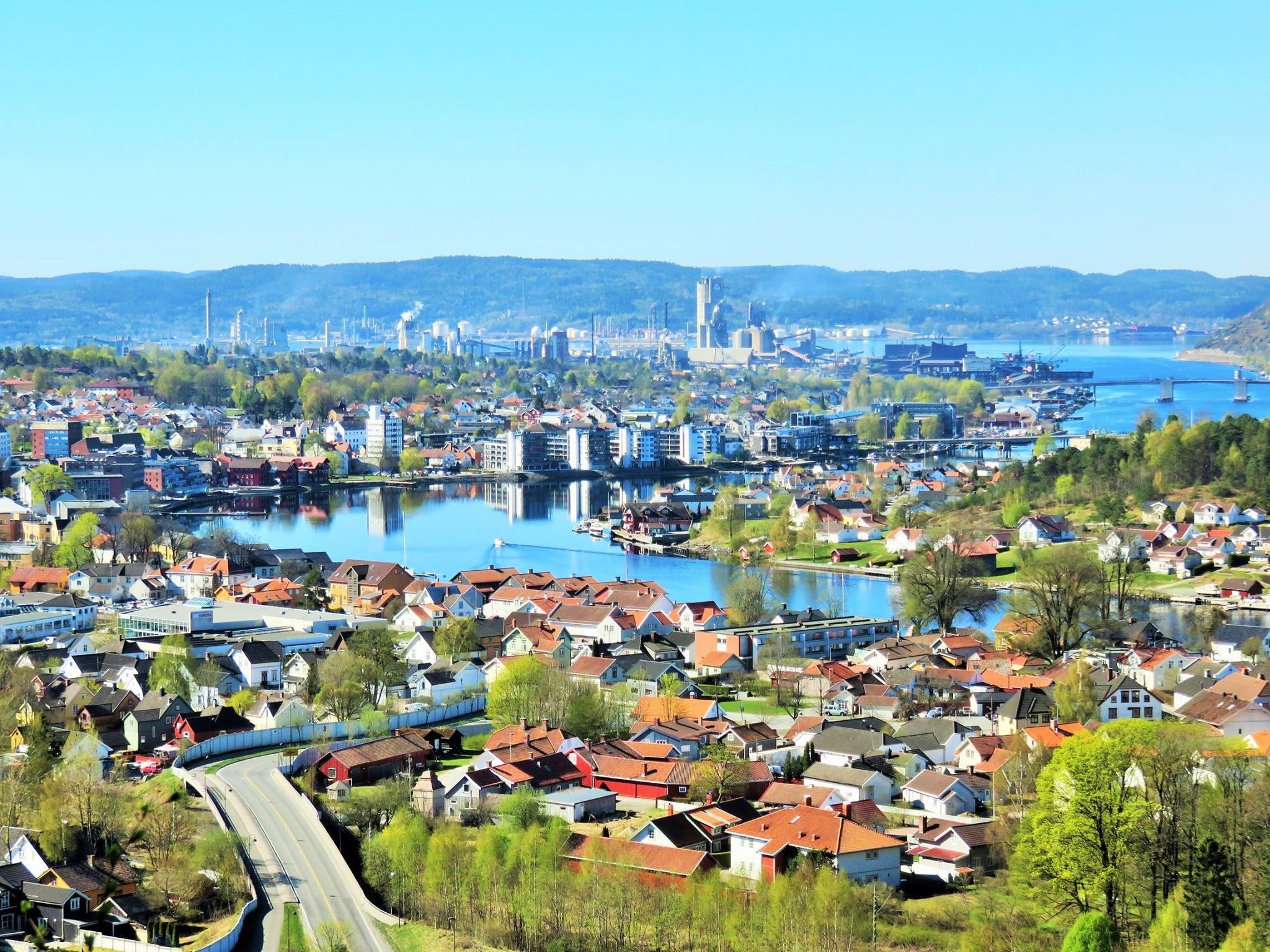
- View of the town
- Interactive map of Porsgrunn
- Coordinates: 59.13166°N 9.64665°E
- Country: Norway
- Region: Eastern Norway
- County: Telemark
- District: Grenland
- Municipality: Porsgrunn Municipality
- Established as
- Ladested: 1652
- Kjøpstad: 1807

Area
  - Total: 21.06 km^{2} (8.13 sq mi)
- Elevation: 44 m (144 ft)

Population (2025)
  - Total: 34,953
  - Density: 1,660/km^{2} (4,300/sq mi)
- Part of Porsgrunn/Skien
- Demonym(s): Porsgrunnsmann; Porsgrunnkvinne; Porsgrunnfolk; Porsgrunning
- Time zone: UTC+01:00 (CET)
  - Summer (DST): UTC+02:00 (CEST)
- Post Code: 3916 Porsgrunn

Porsgrunn (Norwegian pronunciation: [pɔʂɡrʉn]) is a town and the administrative centre of Porsgrunn Municipality in Telemark county, Norway. The town is located at the mouth of the Porsgrunn river where it joins the Frierfjorden. The town of Skien lies immediately to the north of the town of Porsgrunn. The town of Brevik lies about 10 kilometres (6.2 mi) to the south of Porsgrunn, just north of the village of Heistad. The European route E18 highway passes through the southern part of the town of Porsgrunn.

The town is part of the Porsgrunn/Skien metropolitan area, so Statistics Norway does not track the population of the town separately. The portion of the urban area within Porsgrunn Municipality is 21.06-square-kilometre (5,200-acre) and it has a population (2025) of 34,953 and a population density of 1,660 inhabitants per square kilometre (4,300/sq mi).

== History ==
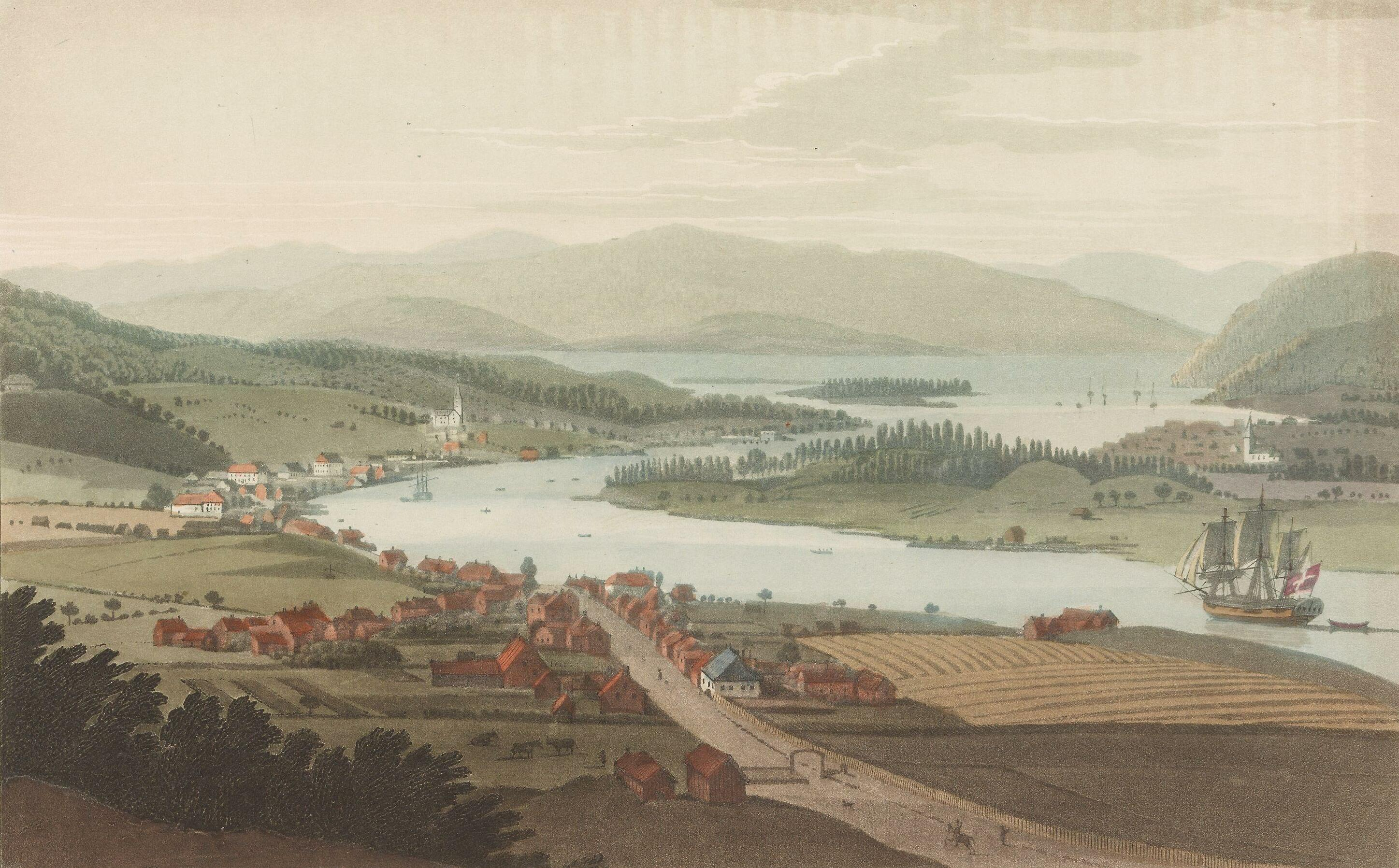
Painting of Porsgrunn (c. 1800)

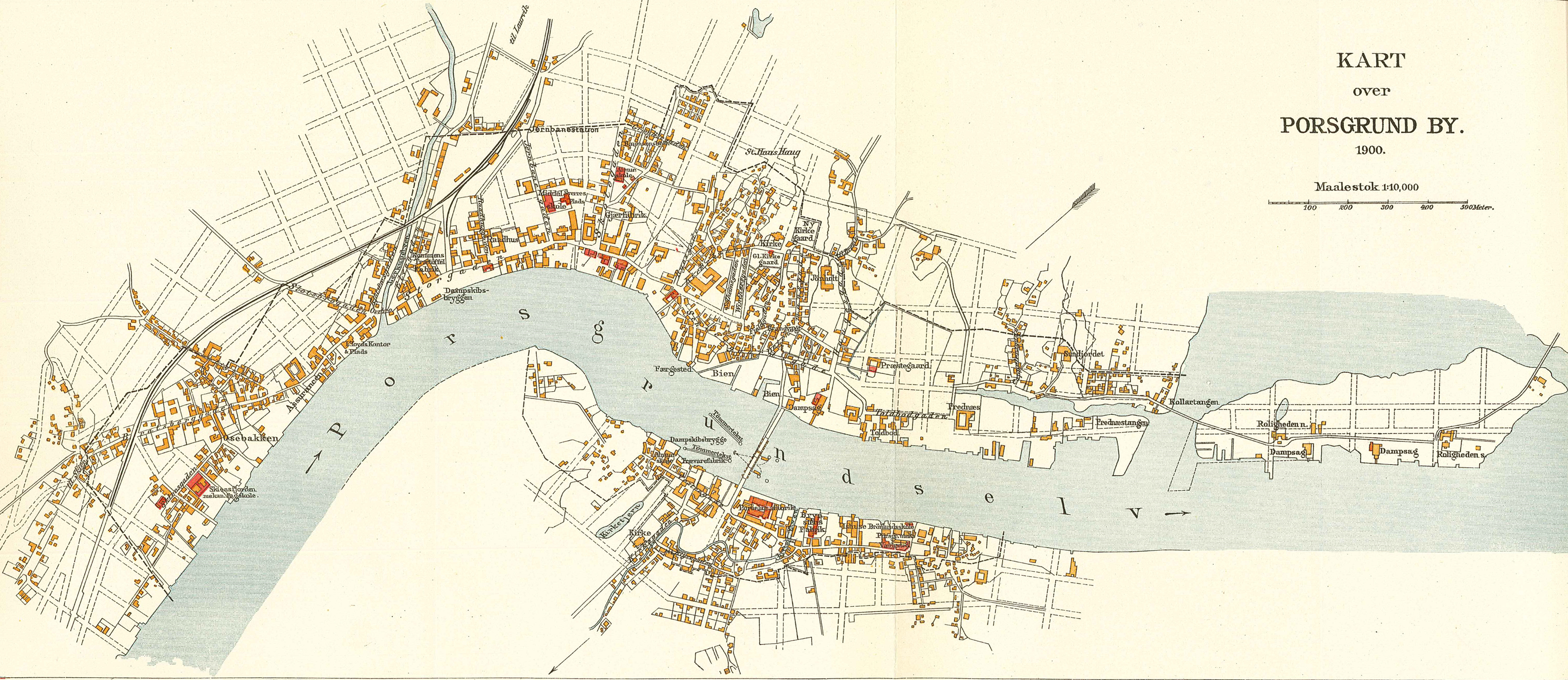
Map of the town of Porsgrunn (1900)

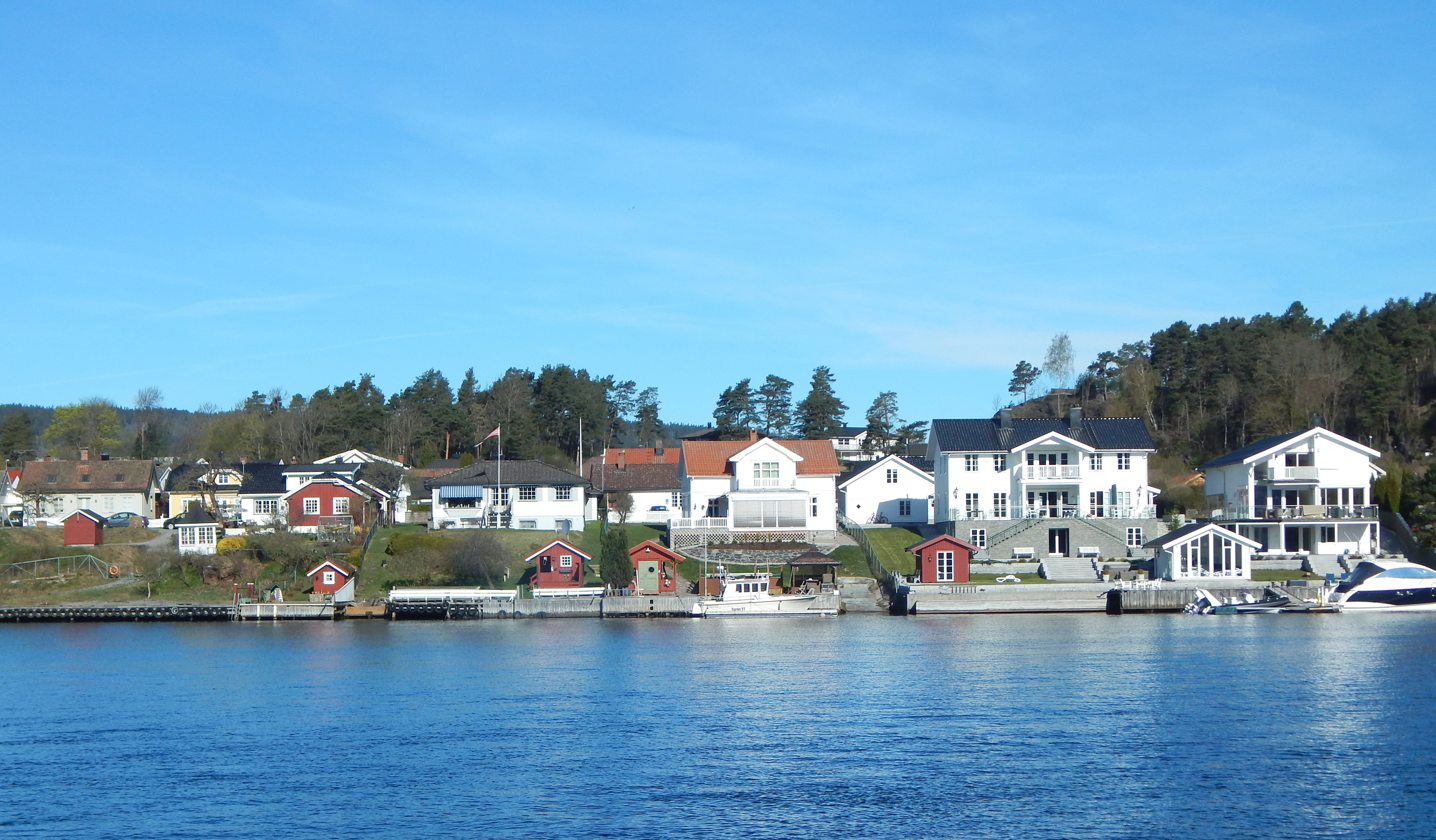
Porsgrunn harbour

Porsgrunn has been an important harbor town in the Grenland area since the late 16th century. In 1653, the Customs House was moved further down the Skien river from Skien to Porsgrunn mainly because industrial waste such as sawdust and mud made the river too shallow to allow boats to go any further up the river. Moving the Custom House to Porsgrunn added to the flourishing harbor activity and Porsgrunn became a thriving market town with a ladested status.

In the 18th century, Porsgrunn was the home of some of Norway's most influential families at the time, such as the Aalls, Cappelens, Løvenskiolds, and Deichmans. Also in this period, Porsgrunn was considered the cultural centre of Norway. On the ecclesiastical side, Porsgrunn was separated from the ancient rural parishes of Eidanger prestegjeld, Solum prestegjeld, and Gjerpen prestegjeld in 1764 to become a prestegjeld with its own minister. Churches within the Porsgrunn prestegjeld included Østre Porsgrunn Church and Vestre Porsgrunn Church. The city was granted limited city status as a kjøpstad in 1807, but this was expanded to full city status in 1842.

The formannskapsdistrikt law of 1837 created a system of local government in Norway by establishing each town or city (ladested or kjøpstad) and each Church of Norway prestegjeld as a civil municipality. On 1 January 1838, the kjøpstad of Porsgrunn was established as Porsgrunn Municipality.

During the 1960s, there were many municipal mergers across Norway due to the work of the Schei Committee. On 1 January 1964, the following areas were merged to form an enlarged Porsgrunn Municipality:

- all of Porsgrunn Municipality (population: 10,863)
- all of Brevik Municipality (population: 2,498)
- all of Eidanger Municipality (population: 13,018)
- the Bakke area of Hedrum Municipality in Vestfold county (population: 75)
- the Enigheten, Høyberg, and Skavåsen areas of Brunlanes Municipality in Vestfold county (population: 12)

Prior to the 1964 merger, the town of Porsgrunn was the same size as Porsgrunn Municipality, but after the merger, the town makes up one area within the larger Porsgrunn Municipality.

Porsgrunn was once home to Skomvær, the country's largest sailing ship. In 1985, the sculpture Amphitrite, the wave and the sea birds was unveiled in Porsgrunn. The sculpture, which is one of Jørleif Uthaug's best known works, has a nautical theme in honor of Porsgrunn's maritime history.

== Government ==
In Norway, municipalities are the unit of local government. This means that cities and towns are simply designations for urban areas, but under current Norwegian law, they have no actual government authority. The city of Porsgrunn lies within Porsgrunn Municipality and is therefore governed by the municipal council of Porsgrunn Municipality.

During its time as a self-governing town, Porsgrunn used a coat of arms that was approved for use on 16 January 1905 until the municipal merger on 1 January 1964. The new Porsgrunn Municipality adopted the same arms that the town had previously used.

== Industry ==
Porsgrunn is an important center of industry and has a long history of heavy industry. Important industries in Porsgrunn include:

- Norsk Hydro (magnesium)
- Elkem (silicon)
- Yara International (nitrogen fertilizers)
- Porsgrund Porcelænsfabrik (porcelain)
- Renewable Energy Corporation (solar power products)
- Isola (building materials, roofing)
- Norcem
- Eramet

== See also ==
- List of towns and cities in Norway
