= Porsgrunn Municipality =

Municipality in Telemark, Norway

Porsgrunn Municipality Porsgrunn kommune
- Municipality
- Porsgrund (historic name)
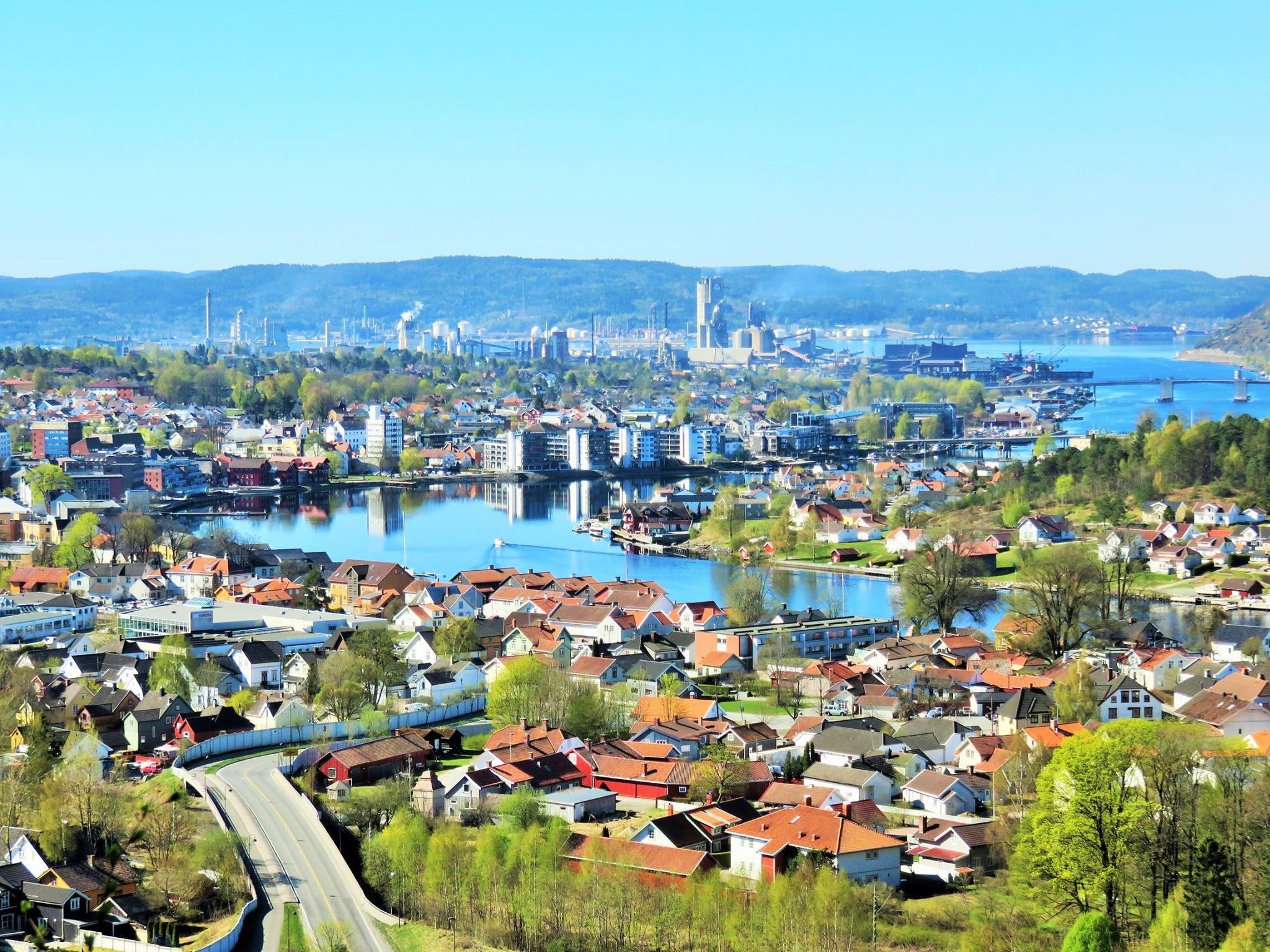
- View of the town of Porsgrunn

- Coat of arms

- Telemark within Norway

- Porsgrunn within Telemark
- Coordinates: 59°6′56″N 9°42′36″E
- Country: Norway
- County: Telemark
- District: Grenland
- Established: 1 Jan 1838
  - Created as: Formannskapsdistrikt
- Administrative centre: Porsgrunn

Government
  - Mayor (2023): Janicke Andreassen (Ap)

Area
  - Total: 164.45 km^{2} (63.49 sq mi)
  - Land: 160.8 km^{2} (62.1 sq mi)
  - Water: 3.65 km^{2} (1.41 sq mi) 2.2%
  - Rank: #316 in Norway
- Highest elevation (Fjerdingen): 359.94 m (1,180.9 ft)

Population (2026)
  - Total: 37,435
  - Rank: #29 in Norway
  - Density: 232.8/km^{2} (603/sq mi)
  - Change (10 years): ▲ +4.1%
- Demonym(s): Porsgrunnsfolk; Porsgrunnsmann; Porsgrunnskvinne

Official language
  - Norwegian form: Bokmål
- Time zone: UTC+01:00 (CET)
  - Summer (DST): UTC+02:00 (CEST)
- ISO 3166 code: NO-4001
- Website: Official website

Porsgrunn (pronounced [pɔʂɡrʉn]) is a municipality in Telemark county, Norway. It is located in the traditional district of Grenland. The administrative centre of the municipality is the city of Porsgrunn. Some other notable settlements in Porsgrunn include the town of Brevik and the villages of Langangen and Heistad.

The 164.45-square-kilometre (63.49 sq mi) municipality is the 316th largest by area out of the 357 municipalities in Norway. Porsgrunn Municipality is the 29th most populous municipality in Norway with a population of 37,435. The municipality's population density is 232.8 inhabitants per square kilometre (603/sq mi) and its population has increased by 4.1% over the previous 10-year period. The conurbation of the cities of Porsgrunn and Skien is called Porsgrunn/Skien by Statistics Norway and it is considered to be the seventh-largest urban area in Norway.

== General information ==
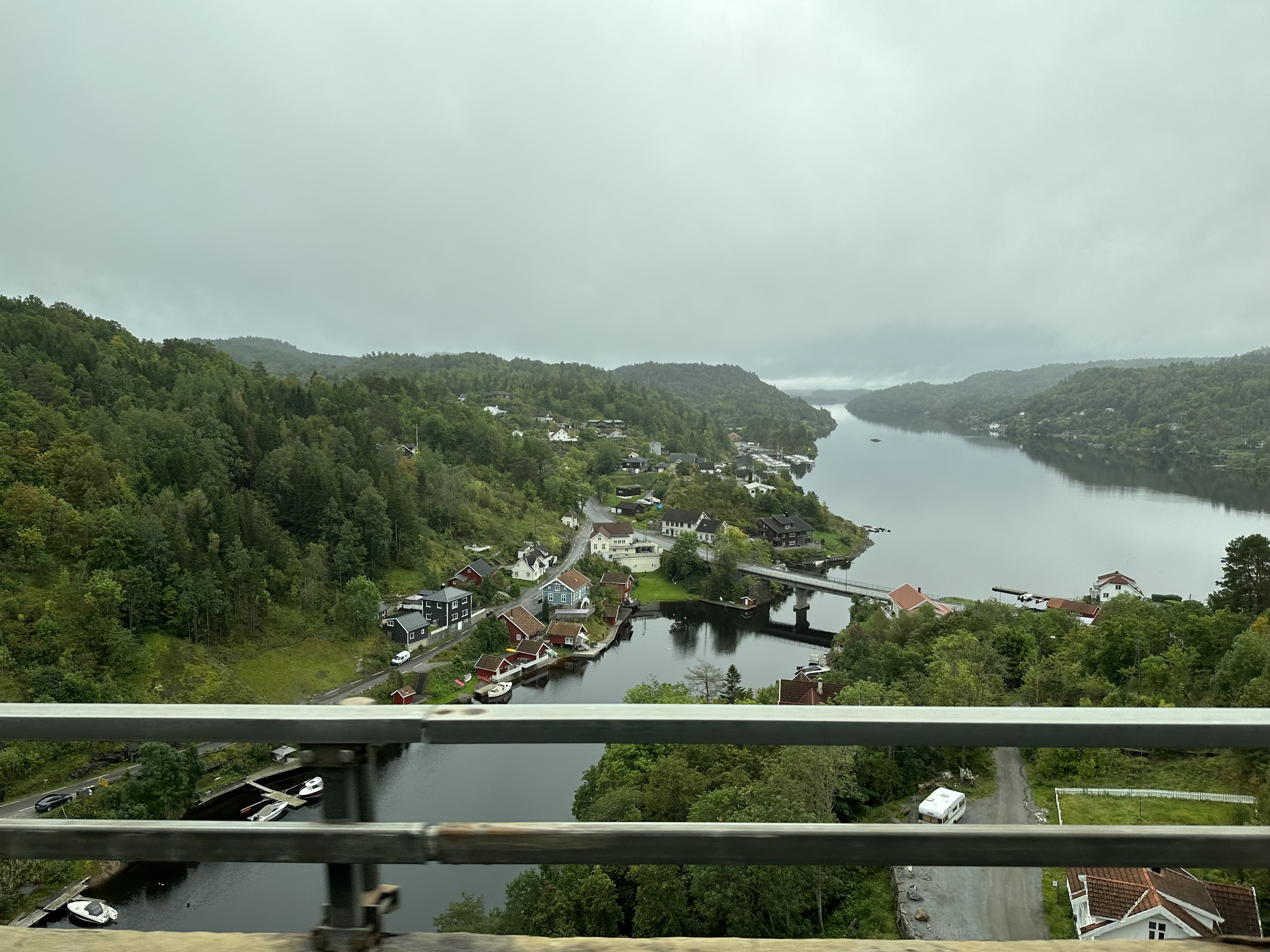
View of the Langangen area

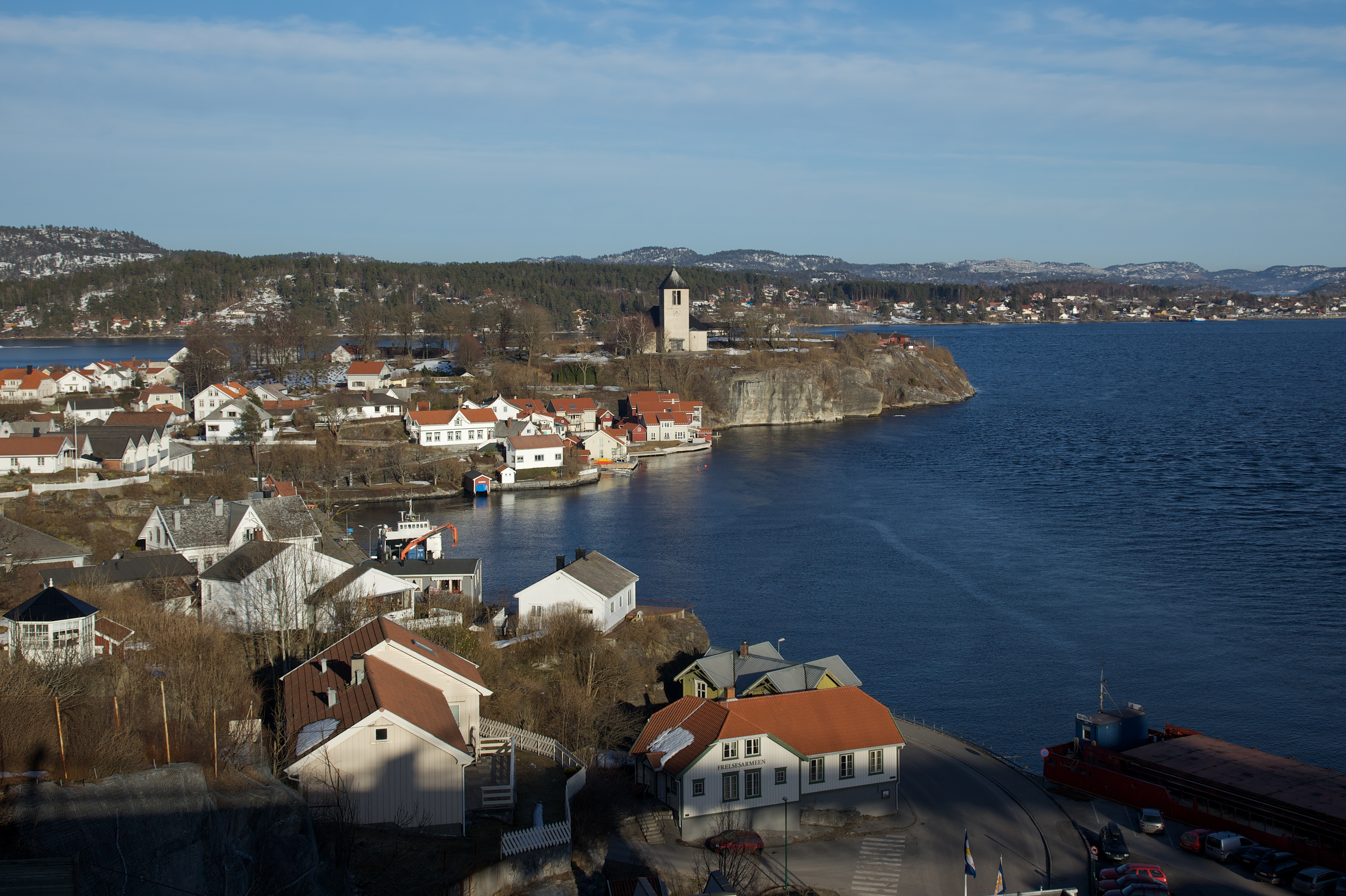
View of the town of Brevik in Porsgrunn Municipality

=== Administrative history ===
The formannskapsdistrikt law of 1837 created a system of local government in Norway by establishing each town (ladested or kjøpstad) and each Church of Norway prestegjeld as a civil municipality. On 1 January 1838, the kjøpstad of Porsgrund was established as Porsgrund Municipality (later spelled Porsgrunn).

The small urban Porsgrunn Municipality grew over time and needed more land. On 1 July 1920, the growing municipality annexed the following rural areas surrounding it:

- a small area from Gjerpen Municipality (population: 437)
- a small area from Eidanger Municipality (population: 550)
- a small area from Solum Municipality (population: 1,614)

During the 1960s, there were many municipal mergers across Norway due to the work of the Schei Committee. On 1 January 1964, the following areas were merged to form an enlarged Porsgrunn Municipality:

- all of Porsgrunn Municipality (population: 10,863)
- all of Brevik Municipality (population: 2,498)
- all of Eidanger Municipality (population: 13,018)
- the Bakke area of Hedrum Municipality in Vestfold county (population: 75)
- the Enigheten, Høyberg, and Skavåsen areas of Brunlanes Municipality in Vestfold county (population: 12)

On 1 January 1968, an area of Skien Municipality (population: 3,554) was transferred to the neighboring Porsgrunn Municipality (these areas had originally been part of Solum Municipality and Gjerpen Municipality).

In 2020, there were many municipal and county mergers across Norway due to the work of the Solberg cabinet. Historically, this municipality was part of Telemark county. On 1 January 2020, the municipality became a part of the newly-formed Vestfold og Telemark county (after Telemark and Vestfold counties were merged). The merger was shortlived, and on 1 January 2024, the merger was undone and this municipality became part of Telemark county once again.

=== Name ===
The place is first mentioned in existing historical records in 1576 ("Porsgrund") by the writer Peder Claussøn Friis in his work Concerning the Kingdom of Norway (see the article: Norwegian literature). He writes: "Two and a half miles from the sea, the Skien River flows into the fjord, and that place is called Porsgrund." The name was probably given during medieval times to the then swampy area by the nuns of Gimsøy Abbey, who went here to collect the shrub pors ("Bog Myrtle"). The last element of the name grunn which means "ground".

The name was historically spelled Porsgrund. On 1 January 1930, the spelling of the name of the municipality was changed to Porsgrunn, giving it a more "Norwegianized" spelling.

=== Coat of arms ===
The coat of arms was originally granted on 16 January 1905 for the town of Porsgrunn. The arms were originally devised in 1905 when the city needed a new city hall. After the municipal merger on 1 January 1964, the old arms were re-adopted by the new, larger Porsgrunn Municipality. The blazon is "Gules and azure, a bend between a bog myrtle branch and an anchor argent" (Norwegian: Delt av sølv skråbjelke. Øvre felt i rødt en sølv pors-kvist, nedre felt i blått et sølv anker). This means the arms have a red (above) and blue (below) field (background) and the charge is a diagonal bend (stripe) with an anchor below it and the branch of a bog myrtle plant above it. The charge has a tincture of argent which means it is commonly colored white, but if it is made out of metal, then silver is used. The silver bend (stripe) symbolizes the small river running through the city. The bog myrtle plant is a canting symbol since the name Porsgrunn comes from the Norwegian word for the plant. The anchor on a blue background symbolizes the importance of the local harbor and sea. The arms were designed by Wilhelm Rudolph.

=== Churches ===
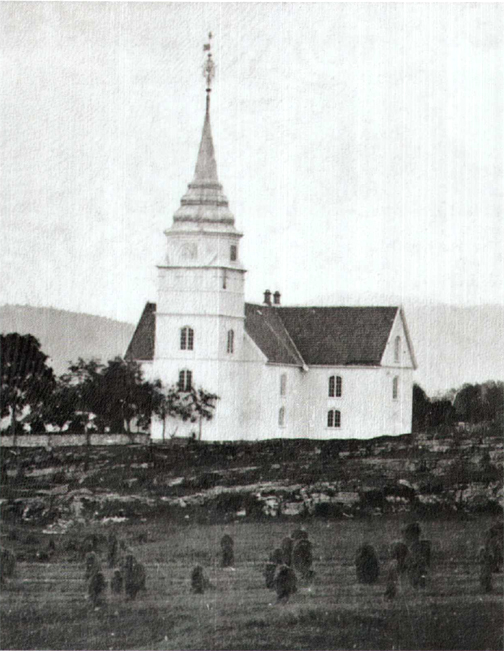
Østre Porsgrunn Church

The Church of Norway has two parishes (sokn) within Porsgrunn Municipality. It is part of the Skien prosti (deanery) in the Diocese of Agder og Telemark.

Churches in Porsgrunn Municipality
Parish (sokn)	Church name	Location of the church	Year built
Eidanger	Brevik Church	Brevik	1963
Eidanger	Eidanger Church	Eidanger	c. 1150
Eidanger	Herøya Church	Porsgrunn	1957
Eidanger	Langangen Church	Langangen	1891
Eidanger	Stridsklev Church	Porsgrunn	2000
Porsgrunn	Vestre Porsgrunn Church	Porsgrunn	1758
Porsgrunn	Østre Porsgrunn Church	Porsgrunn	2019

== History ==
Porsgrunn City Hall

Porsgrunn has been an important harbor town in the Grenland area since the late 16th century. In 1653, the Customs House was moved further down the Skien river from Skien to Porsgrunn mainly because industrial waste such as sawdust and mud made the river too shallow to allow boats to go any further up the river. Moving the Custom House to Porsgrunn added to the flourishing harbor activity and Porsgrunn became a thriving market town with a ladested status.

In the 18th century, Porsgrunn was the home of some of Norway's most influential families at the time, such as the Aalls, Cappelens, Løvenskiolds, and Deichmans. Also in this period, Porsgrunn was considered the cultural centre of Norway. The city was granted limited city status as a kjøpstad in 1807. The town was established as a municipality on 1 January 1838, and it was expanded to full city status in 1842.

Porsgrunn was once home to Skomvær, the country's largest sailing ship. In 1985, the sculpture Amphitrite, the wave and the sea birds was unveiled in Porsgrunn. The sculpture, which is one of Jørleif Uthaug's best known works, has a nautical theme in honor of Porsgrunn's maritime history.

== Geography ==
The river flowing through the town

The highest point in the municipality is the 359.94-metre (1,180.9 ft) tall mountain Fjerdingen. The Frierfjorden, Gunnekleivfjorden, and the mouth of the river Telemarksvassdraget or Porsgrunn River (Porsgrunnselva) are located in the western part of the municipality. The peninsula of Herøya, southeast of the main city centre, was originally an industrial park and has grown into a suburb of Porsgrunn. The Eidangerfjorden runs through the central part of the municipality.

Skien Municipality is located to the northwest, Siljan Municipality is located to the northeast, Larvik Municipality (in Vestfold county) is located to the east, the Skagerrak is located to the south, and Bamble Municipality is located to the west. It is part of a cluster of municipalities in southern Telemark county that constitute the Grenland area.

== Government ==
Porsgrunn Municipality is responsible for primary education (through 10th grade), outpatient health services, senior citizen services, welfare and other social services, zoning, economic development, and municipal roads and utilities. The municipality is governed by a municipal council of directly elected representatives. The mayor is indirectly elected by a vote of the municipal council. The municipality is under the jurisdiction of the Nedre Telemark District Court and the Agder Court of Appeal.

=== Municipal council ===
The municipal council (Kommunestyre) of Porsgrunn Municipality is made up of 49 representatives that are elected to four year terms. The tables below show the current and historical composition of the council by political party.

Porsgrunn kommunestyre 2023–2027
Party name (in Norwegian)	Number of representatives
Labour Party (Arbeiderpartiet)	13
Progress Party (Fremskrittspartiet)	6
Green Party (Miljøpartiet De Grønne)	2
Conservative Party (Høyre)	12
Industry and Business Party (Industri‑ og Næringspartiet)	5
Christian Democratic Party (Kristelig Folkeparti)	3
Red Party (Rødt)	3
Centre Party (Senterpartiet)	1
Socialist Left Party (Sosialistisk Venstreparti)	3
Liberal Party (Venstre)	1
Total number of members:	49

Porsgrunn kommunestyre 2019–2023
Party name (in Norwegian)	Number of representatives
Labour Party (Arbeiderpartiet)	18
People's Action No to More Road Tolls (Folkeaksjonen nei til mer bompenger)	1
Progress Party (Fremskrittspartiet)	4
Green Party (Miljøpartiet De Grønne)	3
Conservative Party (Høyre)	7
Christian Democratic Party (Kristelig Folkeparti)	3
Red Party (Rødt)	3
Centre Party (Senterpartiet)	5
Socialist Left Party (Sosialistisk Venstreparti)	3
Liberal Party (Venstre)	2
Total number of members:	49

Porsgrunn kommunestyre 2015–2019
Party name (in Norwegian)	Number of representatives
Labour Party (Arbeiderpartiet)	20
Progress Party (Fremskrittspartiet)	5
Green Party (Miljøpartiet De Grønne)	2
Conservative Party (Høyre)	10
Christian Democratic Party (Kristelig Folkeparti)	2
Red Party (Rødt)	2
Centre Party (Senterpartiet)	1
Socialist Left Party (Sosialistisk Venstreparti)	2
Liberal Party (Venstre)	2
City and Neighborhood Party (By og Nærmiljøpartiet)	3
Total number of members:	49

Porsgrunn kommunestyre 2011–2015
Party name (in Norwegian)	Number of representatives
Labour Party (Arbeiderpartiet)	16
Progress Party (Fremskrittspartiet)	5
Green Party (Miljøpartiet De Grønne)	1
Conservative Party (Høyre)	10
Christian Democratic Party (Kristelig Folkeparti)	2
Red Party (Rødt)	1
Socialist Left Party (Sosialistisk Venstreparti)	2
Liberal Party (Venstre)	3
City and Neighborhood Party (By og Nærmiljøpartiet)	9
Total number of members:	49

Porsgrunn kommunestyre 2007–2011
Party name (in Norwegian)	Number of representatives
Labour Party (Arbeiderpartiet)	19
Progress Party (Fremskrittspartiet)	13
Conservative Party (Høyre)	4
Christian Democratic Party (Kristelig Folkeparti)	3
Red Electoral Alliance (Rød Valgallianse)	1
Centre Party (Senterpartiet)	1
Socialist Left Party (Sosialistisk Venstreparti)	3
Liberal Party (Venstre)	4
City List (Bylista)	1
Total number of members:	49

Porsgrunn kommunestyre 2003–2007
Party name (in Norwegian)	Number of representatives
Labour Party (Arbeiderpartiet)	17
Progress Party (Fremskrittspartiet)	14
Conservative Party (Høyre)	4
Christian Democratic Party (Kristelig Folkeparti)	3
Red Electoral Alliance (Rød Valgallianse)	1
Centre Party (Senterpartiet)	1
Socialist Left Party (Sosialistisk Venstreparti)	7
Liberal Party (Venstre)	2
Total number of members:	49

Porsgrunn kommunestyre 1999–2003
Party name (in Norwegian)	Number of representatives
Labour Party (Arbeiderpartiet)	21
Progress Party (Fremskrittspartiet)	10
Conservative Party (Høyre)	7
Christian Democratic Party (Kristelig Folkeparti)	4
Red Electoral Alliance (Rød Valgallianse)	1
Socialist Left Party (Sosialistisk Venstreparti)	4
Liberal Party (Venstre)	2
Total number of members:	49

Porsgrunn kommunestyre 1995–1999
Party name (in Norwegian)	Number of representatives
Labour Party (Arbeiderpartiet)	19
Progress Party (Fremskrittspartiet)	8
Conservative Party (Høyre)	8
Christian Democratic Party (Kristelig Folkeparti)	4
Red Electoral Alliance (Rød Valgallianse)	1
Centre Party (Senterpartiet)	2
Socialist Left Party (Sosialistisk Venstreparti)	3
Liberal Party (Venstre)	4
Total number of members:	49

Porsgrunn kommunestyre 1991–1995
Party name (in Norwegian)	Number of representatives
Labour Party (Arbeiderpartiet)	24
Progress Party (Fremskrittspartiet)	5
Conservative Party (Høyre)	14
Christian Democratic Party (Kristelig Folkeparti)	5
Red Electoral Alliance (Rød Valgallianse)	2
Centre Party (Senterpartiet)	4
Socialist Left Party (Sosialistisk Venstreparti)	12
Liberal Party (Venstre)	3
Total number of members:	69

Porsgrunn kommunestyre 1987–1991
Party name (in Norwegian)	Number of representatives
Labour Party (Arbeiderpartiet)	32
Progress Party (Fremskrittspartiet)	8
Conservative Party (Høyre)	15
Christian Democratic Party (Kristelig Folkeparti)	5
Red Electoral Alliance (Rød Valgallianse)	1
Centre Party (Senterpartiet)	1
Socialist Left Party (Sosialistisk Venstreparti)	5
Liberal Party (Venstre)	2
Total number of members:	69

Porsgrunn kommunestyre 1983–1987
Party name (in Norwegian)	Number of representatives
Labour Party (Arbeiderpartiet)	37
Progress Party (Fremskrittspartiet)	1
Conservative Party (Høyre)	16
Christian Democratic Party (Kristelig Folkeparti)	6
Liberal People's Party (Liberale Folkepartiet)	1
Centre Party (Senterpartiet)	1
Socialist Left Party (Sosialistisk Venstreparti)	4
Liberal Party (Venstre)	2
Carl I. Hagen's election list (Carl I. Hagens folkevalgte)	1
Total number of members:	69

Porsgrunn kommunestyre 1979–1983
Party name (in Norwegian)	Number of representatives
Labour Party (Arbeiderpartiet)	35
Progress Party (Fremskrittspartiet)	1
Conservative Party (Høyre)	17
Christian Democratic Party (Kristelig Folkeparti)	8
New People's Party (Nye Folkepartiet)	1
Centre Party (Senterpartiet)	1
Socialist Left Party (Sosialistisk Venstreparti)	3
Liberal Party (Venstre)	3
Total number of members:	69

Porsgrunn kommunestyre 1975–1979
Party name (in Norwegian)	Number of representatives
Labour Party (Arbeiderpartiet)	32
Anders Lange's Party (Anders Langes parti)	1
Conservative Party (Høyre)	11
Christian Democratic Party (Kristelig Folkeparti)	10
New People's Party (Nye Folkepartiet)	4
Centre Party (Senterpartiet)	2
Socialist Left Party (Sosialistisk Venstreparti)	6
Liberal Party (Venstre)	3
Total number of members:	69

Porsgrunn kommunestyre 1971–1975
Party name (in Norwegian)	Number of representatives
Labour Party (Arbeiderpartiet)	32
Conservative Party (Høyre)	9
Christian Democratic Party (Kristelig Folkeparti)	6
Centre Party (Senterpartiet)	2
Socialist People's Party (Sosialistisk Folkeparti)	6
Liberal Party (Venstre)	11
Socialist common list (Venstresosialistiske felleslister)	3
Total number of members:	69

Porsgrunn kommunestyre 1967–1971
Party name (in Norwegian)	Number of representatives
Labour Party (Arbeiderpartiet)	33
Conservative Party (Høyre)	9
Communist Party (Kommunistiske Parti)	1
Christian Democratic Party (Kristelig Folkeparti)	4
Centre Party (Senterpartiet)	1
Socialist People's Party (Sosialistisk Folkeparti)	7
Liberal Party (Venstre)	13
Local List(s) (Lokale lister)	1
Total number of members:	69

Porsgrunn kommunestyre 1963–1967
Party name (in Norwegian)	Number of representatives
Labour Party (Arbeiderpartiet)	35
Conservative Party (Høyre)	10
Communist Party (Kommunistiske Parti)	2
Christian Democratic Party (Kristelig Folkeparti)	5
Centre Party (Senterpartiet)	1
Socialist People's Party (Sosialistisk Folkeparti)	4
Liberal Party (Venstre)	12
Total number of members:	69

Porsgrunn bystyre 1959–1963
Party name (in Norwegian)	Number of representatives
Labour Party (Arbeiderpartiet)	19
Conservative Party (Høyre)	8
Communist Party (Kommunistiske Parti)	3
Christian Democratic Party (Kristelig Folkeparti)	5
Liberal Party (Venstre)	10
Total number of members:	45

Porsgrunn bystyre 1955–1959
Party name (in Norwegian)	Number of representatives
Labour Party (Arbeiderpartiet)	19
Conservative Party (Høyre)	8
Communist Party (Kommunistiske Parti)	4
Christian Democratic Party (Kristelig Folkeparti)	5
Liberal Party (Venstre)	9
Total number of members:	45

Porsgrunn bystyre 1951–1955
Party name (in Norwegian)	Number of representatives
Labour Party (Arbeiderpartiet)	17
Conservative Party (Høyre)	8
Communist Party (Kommunistiske Parti)	4
Christian Democratic Party (Kristelig Folkeparti)	7
Liberal Party (Venstre)	8
Total number of members:	44

Porsgrunn bystyre 1947–1951
Party name (in Norwegian)	Number of representatives
Labour Party (Arbeiderpartiet)	14
Conservative Party (Høyre)	8
Communist Party (Kommunistiske Parti)	7
Christian Democratic Party (Kristelig Folkeparti)	5
Joint list of the Liberal Party (Venstre) and the Radical People's Party (Radikale Folkepartiet)	10
Total number of members:	44

Porsgrunn bystyre 1945–1947
Party name (in Norwegian)	Number of representatives
Labour Party (Arbeiderpartiet)	14
Conservative Party (Høyre)	7
Communist Party (Kommunistiske Parti)	9
Christian Democratic Party (Kristelig Folkeparti)	8
Liberal Party (Venstre)	6
Total number of members:	44

Porsgrunn bystyre 1937–1940*
Party name (in Norwegian)	Number of representatives
Labour Party (Arbeiderpartiet)	19
Temperance Party (Avholdspartiet)	5
Conservative Party (Høyre)	11
Liberal Party (Venstre)	8
Local List(s) (Lokale lister)	1
Total number of members:	44
Note: Due to the German occupation of Norway during World War II, no elections were held for new municipal councils until after the war ended in 1945.

Porsgrunn bystyre 1934–1937
Party name (in Norwegian)	Number of representatives
Labour Party (Arbeiderpartiet)	16
Temperance Party (Avholdspartiet)	4
Conservative Party (Høyre)	11
Communist Party (Kommunistiske Parti)	2
Nasjonal Samling Party (Nasjonal Samling)	3
Liberal Party (Venstre)	8
Total number of members:	44

Porsgrunn bystyre 1931–1934
Party name (in Norwegian)	Number of representatives
Labour Party (Arbeiderpartiet)	15
Temperance Party (Avholdspartiet)	4
Conservative Party (Høyre)	14
Communist Party (Kommunistiske Parti)	2
Liberal Party (Venstre)	9
Total number of members:	44

Porsgrund bystyre 1928–1931
Party name (in Norwegian)	Number of representatives
Labour Party (Arbeiderpartiet)	14
Temperance Party (Avholdspartiet)	7
Conservative Party (Høyre)	13
Communist Party (Kommunistiske Parti)	3
Liberal Party (Venstre)	7
Total number of members:	44

Porsgrund bystyre 1925–1928
Party name (in Norwegian)	Number of representatives
Labour Party (Arbeiderpartiet)	1
Temperance Party (Avholdspartiet)	5
Conservative Party (Høyre)	16
Social Democratic Labour Party (Socialdemokratiske Arbeiderparti)	5
Liberal Party (Venstre)	8
Workers' Common List (Arbeidernes fellesliste)	9
Total number of members:	44

Porsgrund bystyre 1922–1925
Party name (in Norwegian)	Number of representatives
Labour Party (Arbeiderpartiet)	8
Temperance Party (Avholdspartiet)	4
Conservative Party (Høyre)	19
Social Democratic Labour Party (Socialdemokratiske Arbeiderparti)	3
Liberal Party (Venstre)	10
Total number of members:	44

=== Mayors ===
The mayor (Norwegian: ordfører) of Porsgrunn Municipality is the political leader of the municipality and the chairperson of the municipal council. The following people have held this position:

- 1838–1838: Jørgen Flood
- 1839–1840: Jens Gasmann
- 1841–1841: Jørgen Flood
- 1842–1842: Ole Hersted Schjøtt
- 1843–1844: Peter Bøyesen
- 1845–1845: Paulus Flood
- 1846–1846: Peter Bøyesen
- 1847–1849: E.R. Pedersen
- 1850–1853: Thorvald Olsen
- 1854–1854: Thobias Petter Wiibe
- 1855–1855: Simon Karenius Høegh
- 1856–1856: Thobias Petter Wiibe
- 1857–1857: Jørgen Aall Flood
- 1858–1859: Thobias Petter Wiibe
- 1860–1860: Jørgen Aall Flood
- 1861–1862: Niels Mathiesen
- 1863–1864: Hans Møller
- 1865–1865: Niels Mathiesen
- 1866–1866: Hans Møller
- 1867–1867: Niels Mathiesen
- 1868–1869: Hans Møller
- 1870–1870: Niels Mathiesen
- 1871–1871: Hans Møller
- 1872–1872: Niels Mathiesen
- 1873–1873: Hans Møller
- 1874–1874: Niels Mathiesen
- 1875–1875: Hans Møller
- 1876–1876: Niels Mathiesen
- 1877–1877: Hans Møller
- 1878–1878: Niels Mathiesen
- 1879–1879: Hans Møller
- 1880–1880: Niels Mathiesen
- 1881–1883: Hans Møller
- 1884–1884: Niels Mathiesen
- 1885–1890: Hans Møller
- 1891–1892: Alfred P. Wright
- 1893–1893: Jørgen C. Knudsen
- 1894–1899: Alfred P. Wright
- 1900–1907: Herman Jeremiassen
- 1908–1910: Alfred P. Wright
- 1910–1919: Kristian H. Dyring
- 1920–1922: Dr. Anders Nielsen
- 1923–1925: Kristian H. Dyring
- 1926–1930: Lars Andersen (Ap)
- 1931–1931: Arvid Frisak (Ap)
- 1931–1936: Carl P. Wright (H)
- 1937–1940: J.P. Johansen (Ap)
- 1941–1943: Nils Halvorsen (NS)
- 1943–1944: R.O. Helgesen (NS)
- 1944–1945: Josef Bystrøm (NS)
- 1945–1945: Jonas Bjaaland (Ap)
- 1945–1947: J.P. Johansen (Ap)
- 1947–1951: Bjørn Jensen (KrF)
- 1951–1955: Anders Haug (Ap)
- 1955–1959: Emil Bolstad (Ap)
- 1959–1962: Sverre Knutsen (KrF)
- 1962–1964: Anders Haug (Ap)
- 1964–1984: Harald Moen (Ap)
- 1984–1988: Kristen Waaland (Ap)
- 1988–1991: Ivar Moen (Ap)
- 1991–2003: Elisabeth A. Nilsen (Ap)
- 2003–2015: Øystein Kåre Beyer (Ap)
- 2015–2023: Robin Martin Kåss (Ap)
- 2023–present: Janicke Andreassen (Ap)

== Industry ==
Porsgrunn Municipality is an important center of industry and has a long history of heavy industry. Important industries in the municipality include:

- Norsk Hydro (magnesium)
- Elkem (silicon)
- Yara International (nitrogen fertilizers)
- Porsgrund Porcelænsfabrik (porcelain)
- Renewable Energy Corporation (solar power products)
- Isola (building materials, roofing)
- Norcem
- Eramet

== Transportation ==
Transportation links from Porsgrunn:

- Bus (Oslo, Kristiansand, Notodden)
- Train (stops at Porsgrunn Station)
  - The Vestfold Line to Drammen Station and onwards to Oslo Central Station
  - The Bratsberg Line to Skien Station and Notodden Station
- Ferry (Fjordbåtene i Brevik)

== Notable people ==
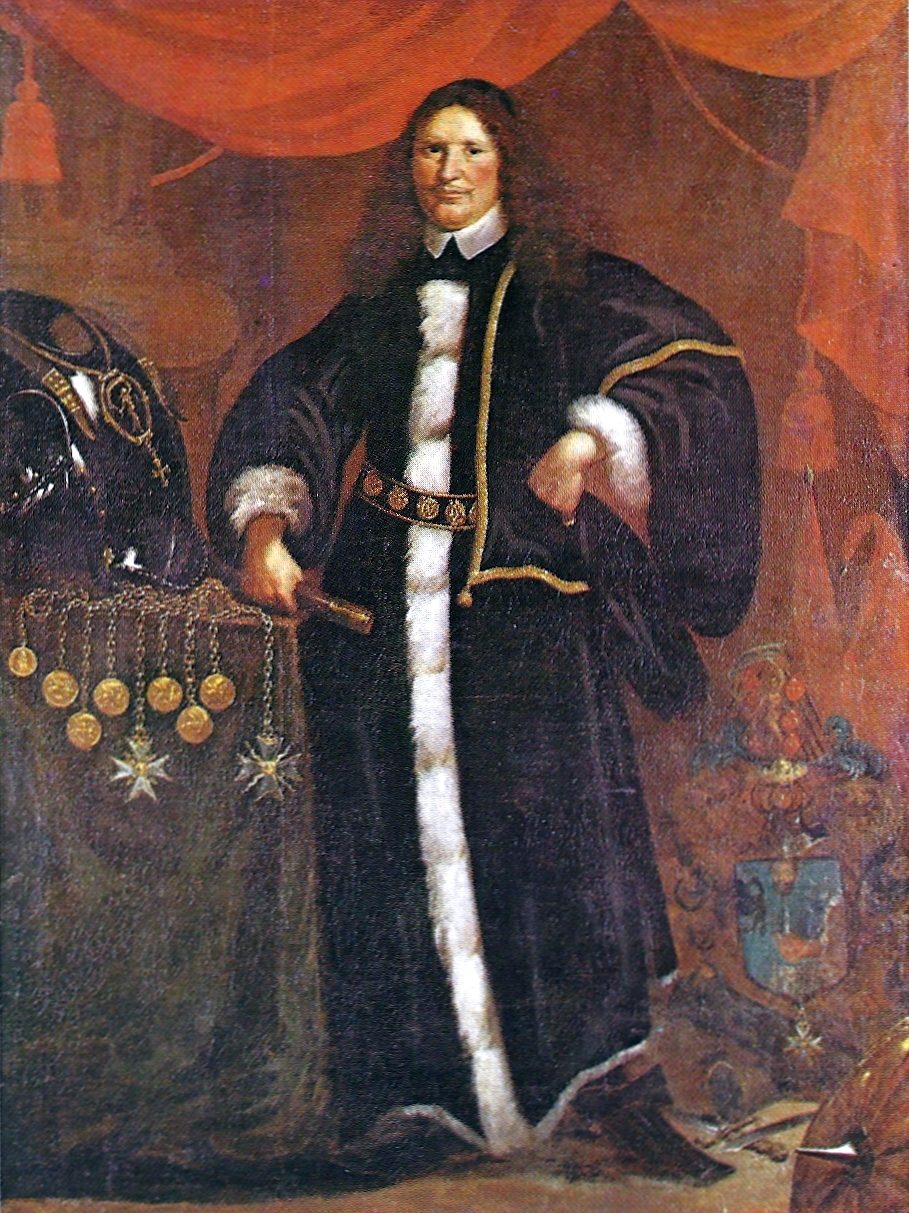
Cort Adeler

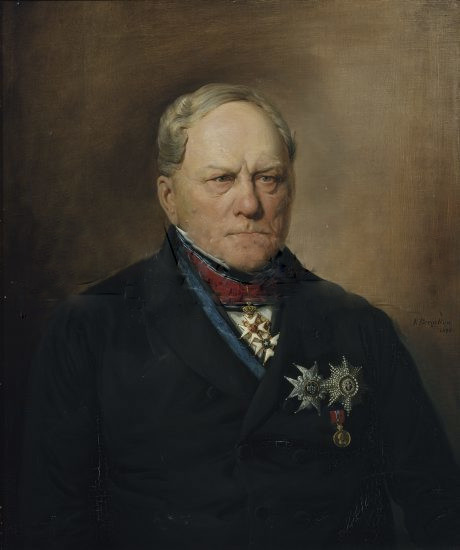
Severin Løvenskiold, 1854

=== Public service and public thinking ===
- Cort Adeler (1622–1675), a Norwegian/Danish admiral
- Niels Aall (1769–1854), an estate owner, businessman and politician who built Ulefos Manor
- Severin Løvenskiold (1777–1856), a nobleman, politician, and Prime Minister of Norway 1828/1841
- Thobias Petter Wiibe (1815–1891), a politician and Mayor of Porsgrund in the 1850s
- Niels Mathiesen (1829–1900), a politician, merchant, and Mayor of Porsgrund during the 1860s to 1880s
- Jørgen Christian Knudsen (1843–1922), a ship-owner and politician
- Johan Castberg (1862–1926), a politician and government minister during the 1900s & 1910s
- Carl P. Wright (1893–1961), a politician who was Mayor of Porsgrunn during the 1930s
- Erik Hesselberg (1914–1972), a sailor, author, painter, sculptor, and Kon-Tiki crewmember
- Einar Tufte-Johnsen (1915–1985), an aviation officer and head of NATO Defense College
- Finn Kristensen (born 1936), an electrician, trade unionist, and government minister during the 1980s & 1990s
- Ann-Marit Sæbønes (born 1945), a physiotherapist and first female Mayor of Oslo during 1992-1995
- Mads Gilbert (born 1947), a physician, humanitarian, activist, and politician
- Kristin Halvorsen (born 1960), the former leader of Socialist Left Party and a government minister
- Vibeke Hein Bæra (born 1964), a lawyer, defended Anders Behring Breivik at his trial
- Robin Kåss (born 1977), a politician who was elected Mayor of Porsgrunn in 2015 & 2019
- Torbjørn Røe Isaksen (born 1978), the former leader of Norwegian Young Conservatives and the Minister of Education and Research
- brothers Kjetil Aleksander Lie (born 1980) & Espen Lie (born 1984), chess players

=== Business ===
- Hans Eleonardus Møller Sr. (1780–1860), a businessperson
- Jørgen Wright Cappelen (1805–1878), a bookseller and publisher who co-founded Cappelen Damm
- Johan Jeremiassen (1843–1889), an entrepreneur, ship-owner, consul, and politician who founded the porcelain flatware company Porsgrund Porselænsfabrik
- Petter Stordalen (born 1962), a billionaire businessman, real estate developer, and hotel owner

=== The Arts ===
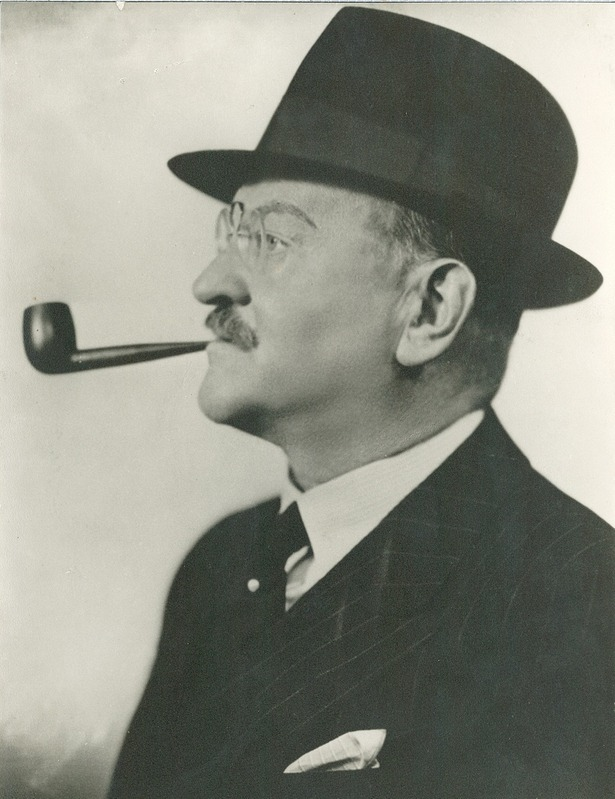
Halfdan Christensen, ca.1940

- Halfdan Christensen (1873–1950), a stage actor and theatre director
- Tone Schwarzott (born 1941), an actress and poet
- Yngvar Numme (born 1944), a singer, actor, revue writer, and director
- Bugge Wesseltoft (born 1964), a jazz musician, pianist, composer, and producer
- Stephen Ackles (born 1966), a vocalist, pianist, and songwriter
- Øyvind Torvund (born 1976), a composer
- Aleksander Walmann (born 1986), a singer for Norway in the Eurovision Song Contest 2017
- Didrik Solli-Tangen (born 1987), a singer for Norway in the Eurovision Song Contest 2010
- Emil Solli-Tangen (born 1990), a opera singer

=== Sport ===
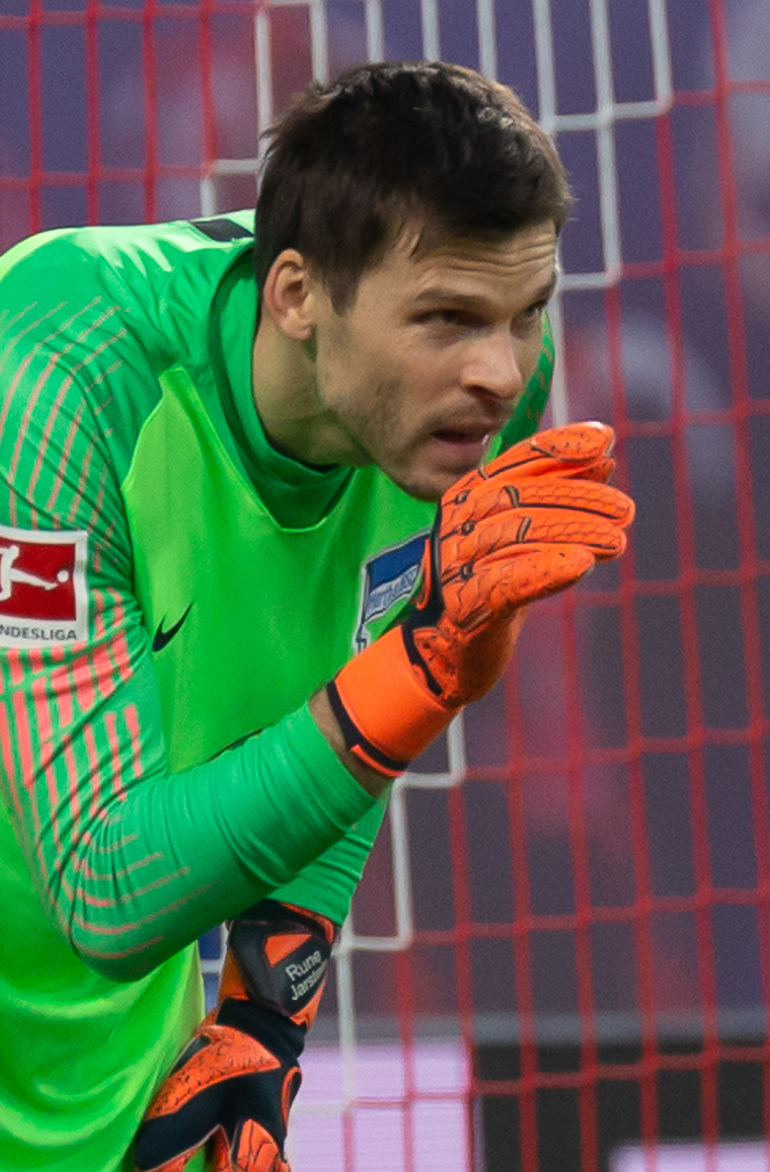
Rune Jarstein, 2019

- Jørgen Juve (1906–1983), a football player, jurist, journalist, and non-fiction writer who was the highest scoring player for Norway with 33 goals in 45 games; captain of Norway, which won Olympic bronze medals in the 1936 Summer Olympics
- Cathrine Roll-Matthiesen (born 1967), a former handball player and team silver medallist at the 1988 & 1992 Summer Olympics
- sisters Anita Valen (born 1968) & Monica Valvik (born 1970), racing cyclists who won the Norwegian National Road Race Championships eleven times between them
- Ronny Deila (born 1975), a football manager who was head coach of New York City FC and former player with 352 club caps
- Tony Capaldi (born 1981), a professional footballer with nearly 300 club caps
- Rune Jarstein (born 1984), a football goalkeeper with about 400 club caps and 69 for Norway
- Espen Ruud (born 1984), a football defender with 430 club caps and 35 for Norway
- Fredrik Nordkvelle (born 1985), a footballer with 360 club caps

== Twin towns – sister cities ==
Porsgrunn has sister city agreements with the following places:

- Kisumu, Kenya
- Pori, Finland
- Sigtuna, Sweden
- Sønderborg, Denmark
- Sundsvall, Sweden
