= Hans Eleonardus Møller Sr. =

Norwegian businessman

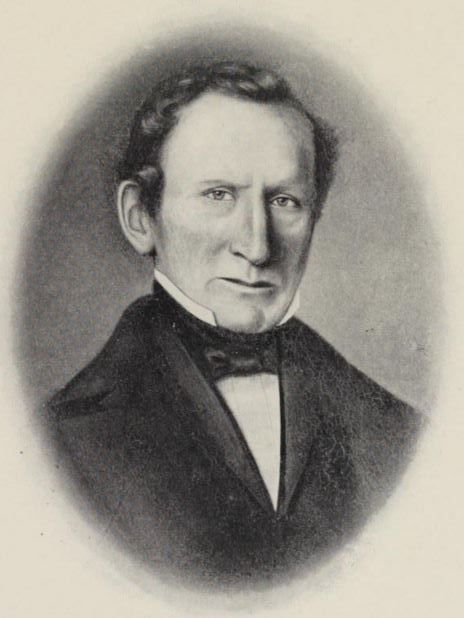
- Born: 1780; Onsø
- Died: 8 April 1860 (aged 79–80)
- Occupation: Businessperson
- Known for: Ship-owner and marine insurance company founder
- Spouse: Inger Aall
- Children: Hans Eleonardus Møller and two daughters.
- Parent(s): Hans Møller and Eleonore Hedevig, née Rasch
- Relatives: Hans J. C. Aall (son-in-law); Hans Møller (grandson) Johannes Møller (nephew)

Hans Eleonardus Møller Sr. (1780 – 8 April 1860) was a Norwegian businessperson.

== Personal life ==
Hans Eleonardus Møller was born in 1780 to Dr. Med. Hans Møller (1736–1796) and his wife Eleonore Hedevig, née Rasch. His father had immigrated to Norway from their native Denmark. He was born at Onsø, but grew up at Åkre at Porsgrund. His uncle was Danish bishop Rasmus Møller, and his cousin was professor Paul Martin Møller. His older brother Jacob Nikolaus moved to Germany, where his son (and Hans Eleonardus' nephew) Johannes Møller became a history professor. Jacob Nikolaus was also an intellectual, befriending Henrik Steffens.

Hans Eleonardus Møller Sr. married socialite Inger Aall (1774–1856), daughter of Nicolai Benjamin Aall. As such his brothers-in-law were noted politicians Niels, Jørgen and Jacob Aall.

Their son Hans Eleonardus Møller became a member of the national parliament and married a daughter of Jacob Aall. Their daughter Simonine married a son of merchant and mayor Jens Gasmann, and their younger daughter Marianne married Hans J. C. Aall, a son of Jacob Aall. The grandson of Møller Sr. Hans Møller also became a parliament member.

== Career ==
Hans Eleonardus Møller Sr. started his career working for his father-in-law Nicolai Benjamin Aall. Following the death of N. B. Aall in 1798, Møller continued working for inheritor Niels Aall. From 1811 they co-owned a company Aall & Møller, but this was not profitable and was dissolved. Møller had invested 100,000 rigsdaler in the venture. He instead started as a merchant of his own, having acquired burghership in October 1803. Concentrating on timber merchantry, he also owned several ships. The Gunboat War from 1807 to 1813 saw the loss of many ships, but he invested and had the ships replaced. One ship seized in 1812 was bought back in 1814. He bought his last ship in 1828. Jacob Aall, father-in-law of two of Møller's children, described Møller as "one of Norway's most active and skillful merchants".

Møller Sr. also became noted in the context of marine insurance, an endeavour spearheaded by his son Hans Eleonardus Jr. An association for marine insurance companies Den første norske Assuranceforening was founded in 1837, with Møller Sr. hired as treasurer in 1838. The association soon became an arena of contest between the Møller family and others, with Møller Jr. breaking away to found a rivalling marine insurance company Det Norske Lloyd in 1860. Møller Sr. died the same year.
