= Hans Eleonardus Møller =

Norwegian politician and businessman

Member of Parliament
- In office 1845–1845

Member of Parliament
- In office 1851–1851

Member of Parliament
- In office 1857–1858

Member of municipal council

Personal details
- Born: 8 November 1804
- Died: 1867 (aged 62–63)
- Party: Independent
- Profession: Merchant, shipbuilder, ship-owner, banker and insurer

Hans Eleonardus Møller (8 November 1804 – 12 September 1867) was a Norwegian politician and businessperson.

== Personal life ==
Hans Eleonardus Møller was born in 1804 to Hans Eleonardus Møller, Sr. (1780–1860) and Inger (1774–1856), née Aall. He had two younger sisters Simonine and Marianne. His grandfather was physician Hans Møller (1736–1796), the member of the family who moved from their native Denmark to Norway.

He married Amborg Laura Aall, daughter of noted statesman Jacob Aall. They had two sons, Hans and Jacob Aall Møller.

== Career ==
Møller started higher education in 1820, but did not complete; instead he eventually settled in Porsgrund as a merchant. He began as a timber merchant, but soon turned to the more lucrative shipbuilding business. He was also one of the largest ship-owners in the region, alongside Peter Magnus Petersen. He was also involved in banking, elected deputy member of the board of directors of Porsgrund savings bank in 1844, and later took the initiative to establish Gjerpen savings bank in 1848.

He was, however, better known in the context of marine insurance, to the point of being named "father of Norwegian marine insurance". An association for ship insurance companies Den første norske Assuranceforening was founded in 1837. Its managing board consisted of Hans Cappelen, Chr. H. Blom and Jacob Müller. However, Hans Eleonardus Møller, Sr. became treasurer in 1838. Hans J. C. Aall, County Governor and brother-in-law of Hans Eleonardus Møller, was also involved. In 1853 they founded another insurance company Porsgrunds Søforsikringsselskab, with Hans Eleonardus Møller as manager. As his two sons too became involved in these organizations, a fraction led by J. J. L. Schaaning sounded opposition toward the "Møllerian autocracy". Thus, in 1860 Møller founded a rivalling marine insurance company Det Norske Lloyd. His son Jacob was employed as treasurer, and took over as manager when Hans Eleonardus Møller died in 1867. When Jacob died in 1872 his other son Hans took over. In 1872 a ship H.E. Møller was built, named in commemoration of Hans Eleonardus Møller, but the ship disappeared in 1874 en route from Le Havre to Quebec.

Hans Eleonardus Møller was also active in politics, as an elected member of the Norwegian Parliament in 1845, 1851 and 1857–1858, representing the constituency of Bratsberg. He was also a member of the executive committee of the municipal council of Gjerpen Municipality.

He died of a stroke.
