= Porsgrunn/Skien =

Urban area in Telemark, Norway

Coordinates: 59.0767°N 9.68694°E

Map of the urban area (in 2022)

Skien/Porsgrunn or Porsgrunn/Skien is the 7th largest urban area in Norway. It is located in Grenland in southern Telemark county.

The urban area covers parts of three municipalities: Skien Municipality, Porsgrunn Municipality, and Bamble Municipality and the five towns of Porsgrunn, Skien, Stathelle, Brevik, and Langesund. The 54.8-square-kilometre (13,500-acre) village has a population (2026) of 97,240 and a population density of 1,774 inhabitants per square kilometre (4,590/sq mi).

== Name ==
The area is commonly referred to as Skien/Porsgrunn, but Statistics Norway refers to it as Porsgrunn/Skien.
