= Fjordbåtene i Brevik =

Norwegian ferry company

Fjordbåtene i Brevik is a passenger ferry operator based in Porsgrunn, Norway, that provides the route Brevik–Sandøya–Bjørkøya–Brevik twenty-four times daily under contract to Vestviken Kollektivtrafikk. The company is owned by the City of Porsgrunn.
