= Jørgen Flood =

Norwegian merchant and politician

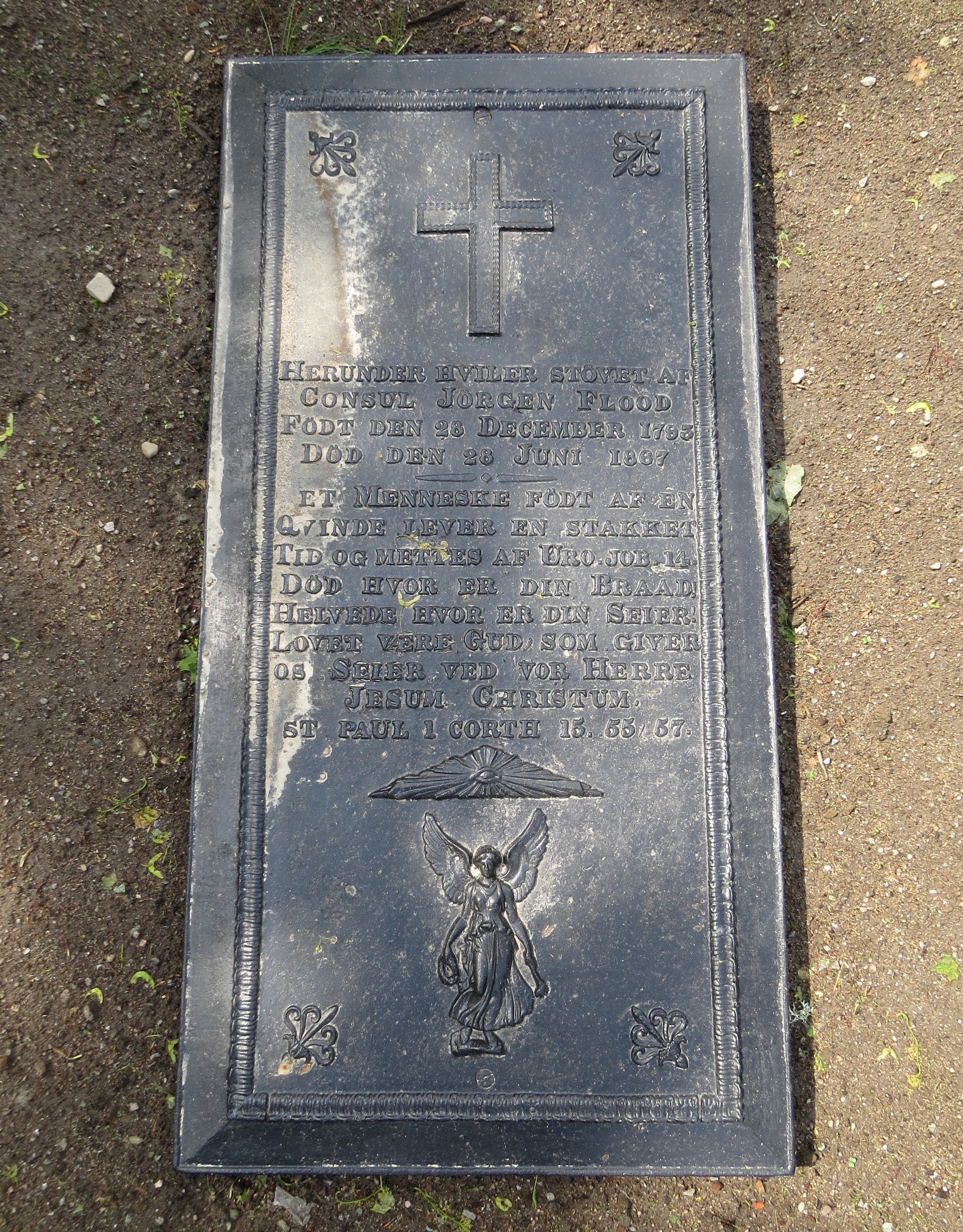
Burial of Jörgen Flood, Solum Church, Skien

Jørgen Flood (28 December 1792 – 28 June 1867) was a Norwegian merchant and politician.

== Personal life ==
Jørgen Flood was born in 1792 to merchant Peder Jørgensen Flood (1756–1832) and Inger Jørgine Jørgensen (1769–1843), née Wesselstoft. He had ten brothers and sisters. They grew up in Skien, but Jørgen later moved to Eidanger. Following the death of his wife Hanna in 1863, Jørgen moved to Grimstad. He died in that city.

He had married Hanna Aall, daughter of Constitutional founding father Jørgen Aall, in 1818. They had seven children, the most prominent being Jørgen Aall Flood and Fritz Trampe Flood. In addition, their youngest daughter Constance married long-time mayor Niels Mathiesen.

== Career ==
Together with his brother Elias Marthinius, Jørgen Flood ran the merchant company I. & E. M. Flood, dealing with grain, tobacco and manufactured goods. One of their outlets, the so-called Floodebutik (Flood shop) was "visited by the most distinguished public of the Skiensfjorden", according to one historian. Jørgen Flood also bought Bolvig iron works in 1841, and was also consul.

In 1837, when local governance was established in Norway, Flood became the first mayor of Porsgrund municipality. He also held that position in the years 1838 and 1841. He also served as vice mayor in 1839 and 1840, under consul Jens Gasmann who started as deputy mayor. Another of Jørgen's brothers, merchant Paulus Flood, served as mayor in 1845.
