= Robin Kåss =

Norwegian politician

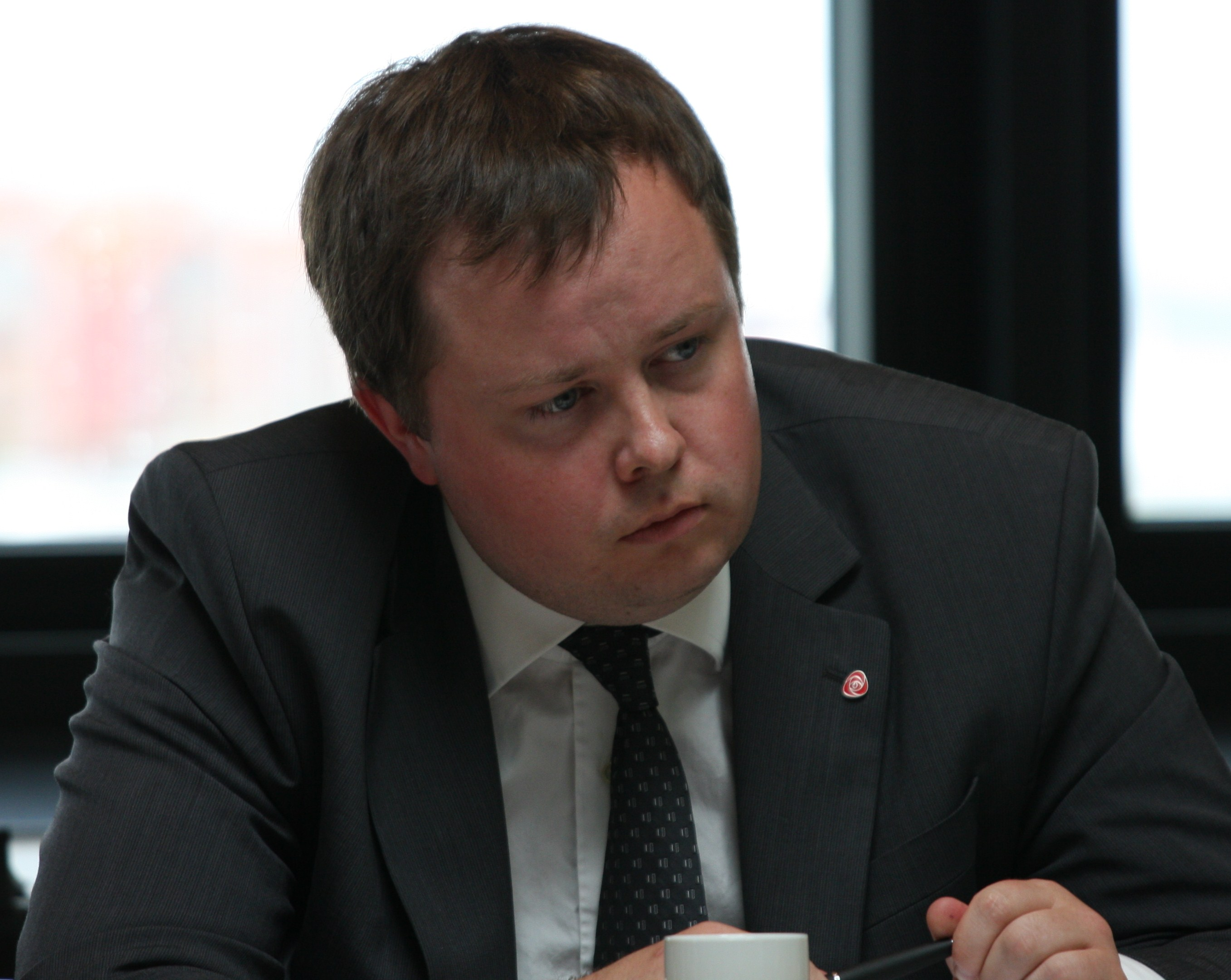
Robin Kåss

Robin Martin Kåss (born 10 January 1977 in Dublin, Ireland) is a Norwegian politician for the Labour Party. He has lived most of his life in Porsgrunn, Telemark, Norway.

Kåss joined the Workers' Youth League at a young age, and was also active in JEF Norway. He was elected to Porsgrunn city council in 1995. After completing national service in the Royal Norwegian Navy, he moved to Liverpool, England to study medicine, graduating in 2003 with honours. He started as a family doctor in Skien, and later also became the medical director of the GP-led casualty unit. He was elected for a second term in Porsgrunn city council in 2007 after becoming leader of the Porsgrunn Labour Party the same year.

In October 2008 Kåss was appointed State Secretary in the Norwegian Ministry of Petroleum and Energy. In June 2010 he was appointed State Secretary in the Norwegian Ministry of Health and Care Services.

In 2015 Kåss was elected Mayor of the city of Porsgrunn; he was reelected in 2019.
