= Amphitrite, the wave and the sea birds =

Stainless steel sculpture in Porsgrunn, Norway

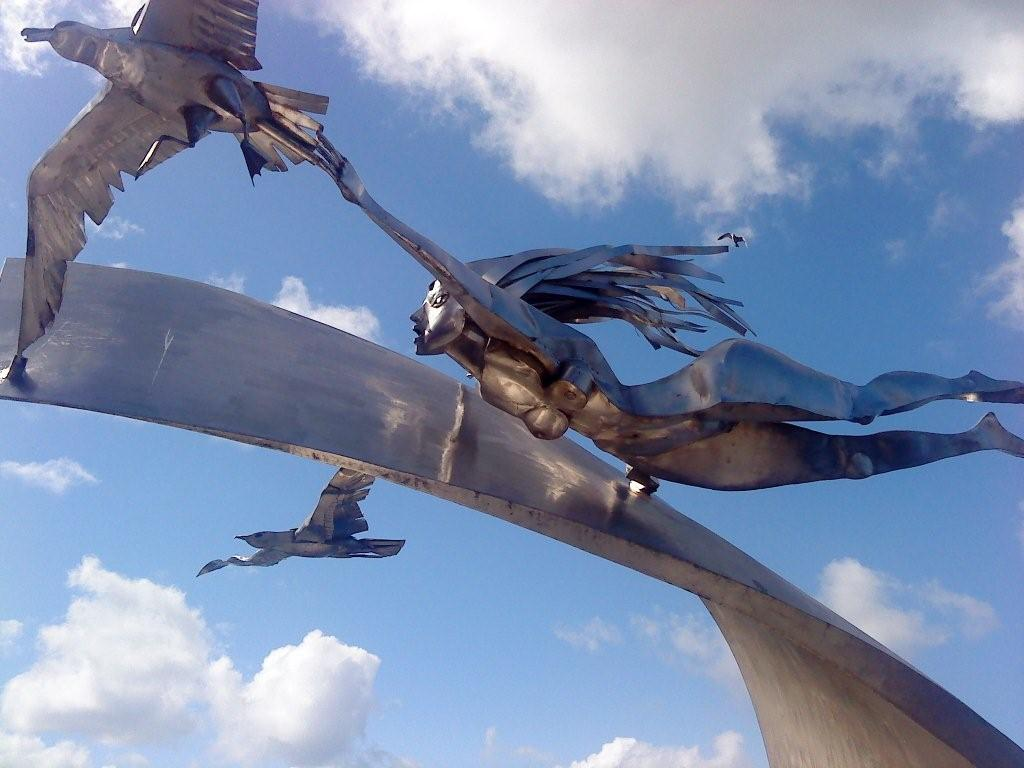
- Artist: Jørleif Uthaug
- Year: 1985
- Type: Metal sculpture
- Location: Porsgrunn, Norway; 59°8′23″N 9°39′4″E

Amphitrite, the wave and the sea birds (Norwegian: Amfitrite, bølgen og havfuglene) is a 4 m (13 ft) tall stainless steel sculpture by Jørleif Uthaug located in Porsgrunn, Norway. The work consists of a nude female figure (representing Amphitrite, the wife of Neptune) and two seabirds gliding over a large geometric wave. It is one of Uthaug's most recognizable and celebrated works.

The piece, which was unveiled in May 1985, is one of only a few Uthaug sculptures to include figurative elements, but it also displays many features typical of Uthaug's work, including modern style, metal construction, and themes of seafaring and the ocean. The sculpture was initially located in Nordentorget, a town square on Storgata in central Porsgrunn. In spring of 1999, it was moved behind the then-Aetat building on Strandpromenaden, a riverwalk along the eastern bank of Porsgrunn River, where it still stands today.

== Creation ==
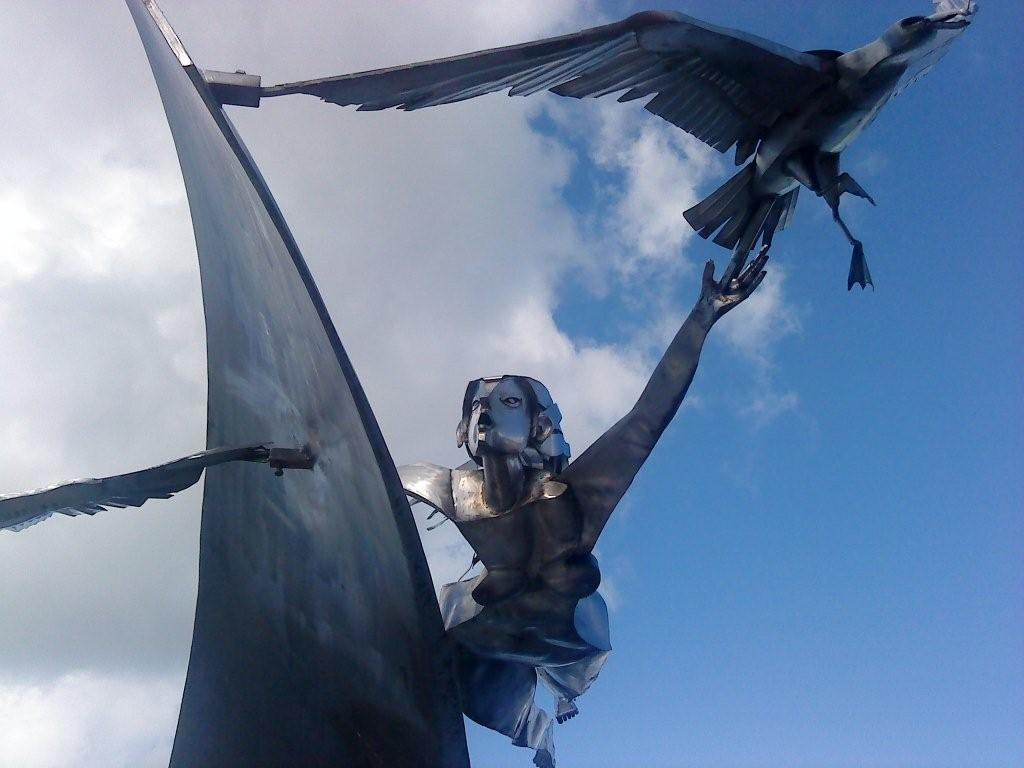
The sculpture as seen from another angle.

In 1977, the city of Porsgrunn held a competition to determine who would create a new sculpture in Nordentorget square. Uthaug was at that point an established sculptor in the Norwegian art world, having studied at the Norwegian National Academy of Craft and Art Industry under the likes of Axel Revold, Per Krohg, and Jean Heiberg, and he was well known for his public artworks such as the relief People on a beach (1961) in Troms County Hall and the steel sculpture Expansion (1977) for Mandal City Hall. He prepared drawings for the sculpture and submitted them to the competition.

The next year, the competition jury selected Jørleif Uthaug's proposed artwork out of a very competitive pool of applicants, including one proposal by noted sculptor Fritz Røed. The jury said of the work, "The sculpture's symbolism is good and the jury would find it well suited to a city like Porsgrunn with its maritime historical background. The daring and fanciful solution seems original ... and the contrast between the large curved plane and the figures is resolved in a successful way."

The city of Porsgrunn finalized their contract with Jørleif Uthaug in 1981. However, in January 1981 Uthaug was involved in a traffic collision which left him partially paralyzed. Despite several attempts to work on the sculpture with the help of assistants, his temporary paralysis led to the work being postponed for several years.

The steel wave form was made to Uthaug's specifications at Hamy Sveis AS in Oslo under the leadership of engineer Einar Aurskog. The figures were created and welded to the wave by Uthaug himself once he was in good health. The sculpture was unveiled on 11 May 1985 by Lars Roar Langslet, the Norwegian Minister of Cultural and Scientific Affairs. Langslet said of the unveiling, "I remember how happy Jørleif Uthaug seemed when this magnificent monument was finally in place. Perhaps he saw it as a sign that he was finally back on track as a creative artist, with the steel wave's power and the seabirds' flight in his mind's eye."
