= Niels Mathiesen =

Norwegian politician and merchant

Niels Mathiesen (1829–1900) was a Norwegian politician and merchant.

== Personal life ==
Hans Møller was born as the third child of merchant Mathias Thorstensen Mathiesen and Karen, née Johnsen. In total, he had three sisters and three brothers. He married Constance Flood, daughter of consul and mayor Jørgen Flood and Hanna Aall.

== Career ==
His most notable role was that of mayor of Porsgrund municipality, a position he held in the years 1861, 1862, 1865, 1867, 1870, 1872, 1874, 1876, 1878, 1880 and 1884. He alternated with consul Hans Møller. As such Mathiesen was vice mayor in 1868, 1871 and then every year up to and including 1883 in which he was not mayor. He was elected to the Norwegian Parliament in 1862, 1865 and 1868, representing the constituency of Porsgrund.

As a businessman he co-owned the company M. T. Mathiesens Enke & Søn with his mother, having inherited it upon his father's death. Niels Mathiesen later disestablished the company, but continued running a firm of agents.
