= Paulus Flood =

Norwegian merchant and politician

Paulus Mathias Frederikus Flood (11 March 1804 – 26 December 1847) was a Norwegian merchant and politician.

== Personal life ==
Paulus Flood was born in 1804 to merchant Peder Jørgensen Flood (1756–1832) and Inger Jørgine Jørgensen (1769–1843), née Wesseltoft. He had ten brothers and sisters, and grew up in Skien.

He married Constance Aall, daughter of Constitutional founding father Jørgen Aall, in 1830. His most prominent child was Constantius Flood, an author.

== Career ==
He spent his professional career as a merchant in Porsgrund, having acquired burghership in 1829. He was not involved in the merchant company I. & E. M. Flood, run by his brothers Jørgen and Elias Marthinius. Paulus was also employed as treasurer and accountant of Porsgrund savings bank in 1844.

As a politician, Paulus Flood was elected to the first municipal assembly in 1837, and was elected mayor of Porsgrund municipality in 1845. He then held the position of vice mayor in 1846. His brother Jørgen had been mayor.
