= Jens Gasmann =

Norwegian businessperson and politician (1776–1850)

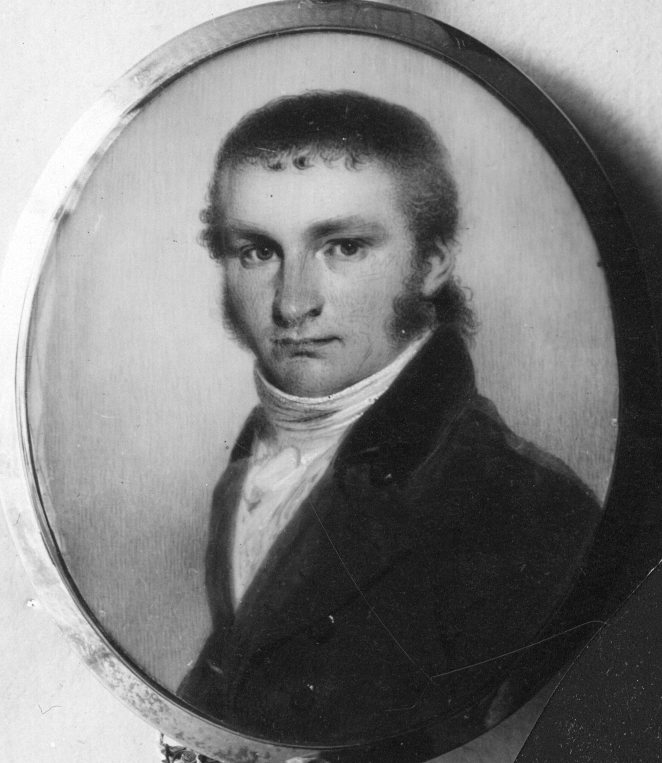
Jens Severin Gasman

Jens Severin Gasmann (1776 – 7 May 1850) was a Norwegian businessperson and politician.

== Personal life ==
He was born in 1776 in Gjerpen as the son of attorney Niels Egidius Gasmann (1747–1811) and his wife Kirstine Schweder (1757–1785) of the wealthy Zachariassen Wesseltoft family.

Jens Gasmann married Bodil Zachariassen Wesseltoft (1779–1848) in 1800. The couple had two daughters and two sons. Their youngest son Niels Egidius Møller became a merchant in Christiania, and married Simonine Møller, sister of parliament member Hans Eleonardus Møller and aunt of Hans Møller.

== Career ==
Jens Gasmann began his career at sea at a young age, and became a shipmaster in 1798, sailing a period for ship-owner Jørgen Aall. He took part in the Gunboat War, between Denmark-Norway and Great Britain, as secretary of admiral Fisker. In 1812 Jens Gasmann acquired burghership and settled on the mainland. He bought various real estate, but had to face a fire in 1824. However, he coped through this, raised a new building and later set up a distillery there. From 1818 he was also vice consul for Great Britain, the country he had helped waging war against only eight years earlier. He was later promoted to consul.

As a politician he served as a deputy representative in the Norwegian Parliament in 1824, representing the constituency of Skien og Porsgrund. In 1837, when local governance was introduced in Norway, Gasmann became the first deputy mayor of Porsgrund municipality. Jørgen Flood was mayor, following a "mutual agreement" between the council members. Gasmann served as deputy mayor again in 1838, before becoming mayor in 1839 and 1840 with Flood as deputy mayor. Gasmann left local politics on 31 December 1840.

From the 1820s Gasmann worked as a trade inspector and later harbor master.

After his death, an auction were held on his property. It was bought by later mayor Simon Karenius Høegh.
