= Heistad =

Village in Porsgrunn Municipality, Norway

- Village
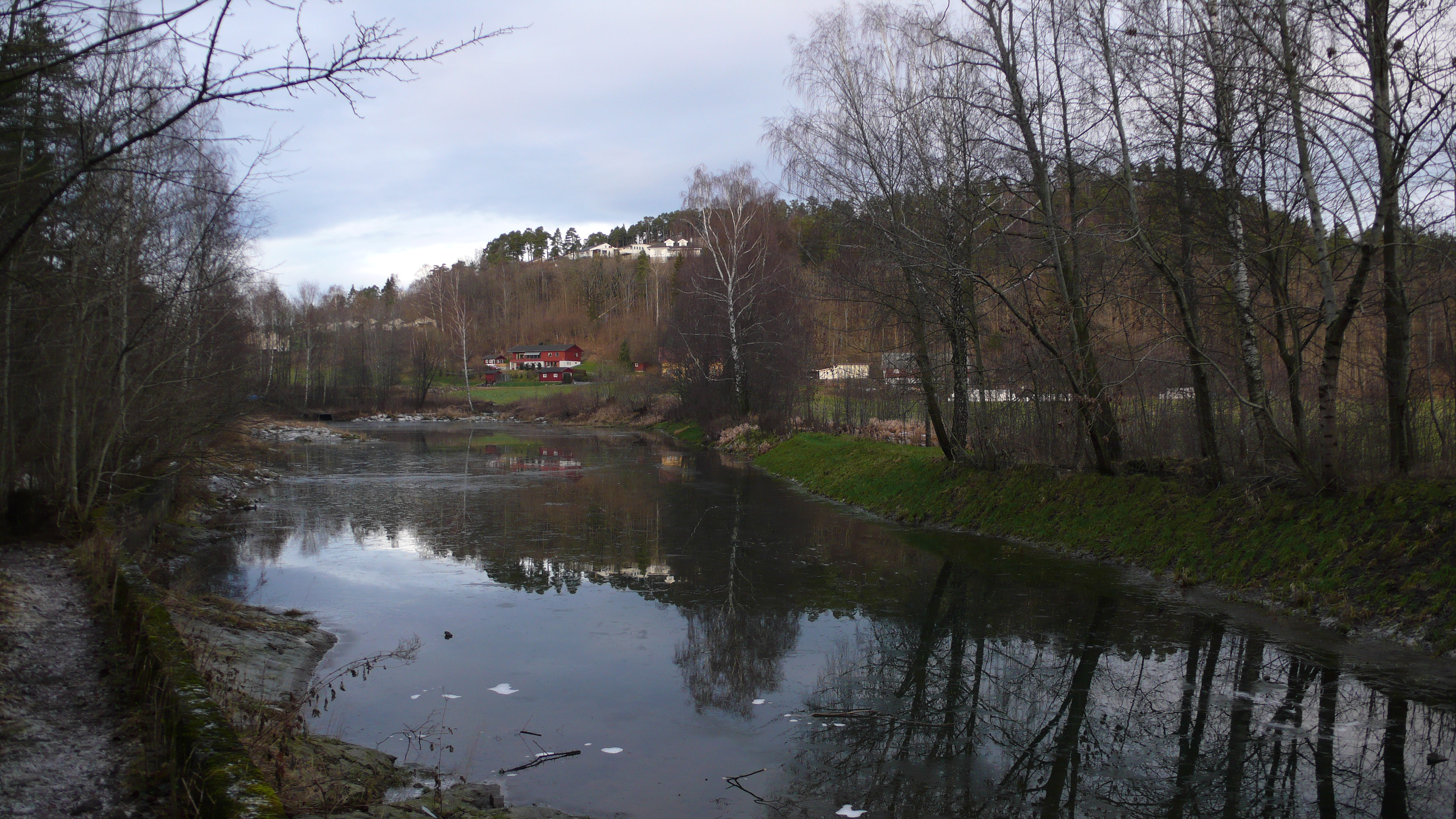
- View of the "Nordre Dam" pond in Heistad, once used for ice cutting
- Interactive map of Heistad
- Coordinates: 59.07778°N 9.68811°E
- Country: Norway
- Region: Eastern Norway
- County: Telemark
- District: Grenland
- Municipality: Porsgrunn Municipality
- Elevation: 24 m (79 ft)
- Time zone: UTC+01:00 (CET)
  - Summer (DST): UTC+02:00 (CEST)
- Post Code: 3941 Porsgrunn

Heistad is a village in Porsgrunn Municipality in Telemark county, Norway. The village is located on the western shore of the Eidangerfjorden, just north of the town of Brevik. The village is mainly a residential area. About 2 kilometres (1.2 mi) to the west is the Kjørholt limestone quarry.
