= Isola (company) =

Norwegian building materials company

- Company type: Concern
- Industry: Building materials
- Founded: 1940 in Oslo, Norway
- Founder: Harald Thiis-Evensen
- Headquarters: Porsgrunn, Norway
- Key people: Bjørnar Gulliksen (CEO); Jon Karlsen (Chairman)
- Products: building materials roofing shingles roofing systems solar roofing systems waterproofing systems moisture control flooring systems windows bathrooms foundations wall systems
- Website: www.isola.com

Isola is a manufacturer, distributor and installer of building materials. The company was founded in 1940 by Harald Thiis-Evensen in Oslo. The company HQ is now in Porsgrunn.

Isola is organized as a concern with Isola Holding AS as the parent company. The Norwegian magazine Kapital ranked Isola as the 455th largest company in Norway in 2020. Isola has manufacturing locations in Norway and the Czech Republic.

In 2012, Erna Solberg stated that "Isola is an example of how important innovation is for Norwegian industry to secure its competitiveness into the future". A former Isola factory site in Brevik, Norway, was sold in 2014 and is being redeveloped for housing. Isola entered into the solar market in 2020 and created a partnership with utility company Skagerak Energi in 2021.
