= Simon Karenius Høegh =

Norwegian bank treasurer, merchant and politician

Mayor of Brevig
- In office 1840–?

Mayor of Porsgrund municipality
- In office 1855–1855

Vice mayor of Porsgrund municipality
- In office 1854–1854
- In office 1858–1858
- In office 1863–1863
- In office 1864–1864
- In office 1866–1866

Personal details
- Born: 7 September 1810
- Died: 28 December 1893 (aged 83)
- Party: Independent
- Occupation: Bank treasurer and merchant

Simon Karenius Høegh (7 September 1810 – 28 December 1893) was a Norwegian bank treasurer, merchant and politician.

== Personal life ==
Simon Karenius Høegh was born in 1810. He was originally christened Søren, because the baptizer was almost "deaf", however the mistake was resolved. His father Anders Jensen Høegh was described by one historian as a "common, enterprising, skillful burgher of Brevig". He had been married for the second time, to Cathrine Cudrio, née Zachariassen.

Simon Karenius Høegh married Karen Sophie Wiborg (1815-1905) in 1843. She was the daughter of Simon Grotter Wiborg and his wife Karen, née Holst, from Tønsberg. Karen Sofie Høegh became a noted genealogist. The couple got three sons, one of whom became vicar, and three daughters.

== Career ==
Simon Karenius Høegh finished school in 1827, and left for Truro to learn the English language. He returned to Norway and took a business and trade exam in Arendal in 1831. In 1837 he acquired burghership in Skien. He started his own business, helped by a 1000 speciedaler funding from his father and grandmother. He started timber merchantry, and bought one schooner as a freight vessel. He later expanded from this starting point, becoming a ship-owner. He was also elected mayor of Brevig in 1840.

In 1851 he moved to Porsgrund, almost by coincidence according to historians. He was present at the auction which followed the death of businessman, consul and politician Jens Gasmann, and there Høegh bought Gasmann's property. In Porsgrund Høegh set up a beer brewery, later turned to a bakery. He also owned a gunpowder factory, but it exploded in 1875. By then he had been appointed treasurer of Porsgrund savings bank, a job he held from 1868 to his death in 1893.

Despite having left Brevig, Høegh was still active in politics. He was elected mayor of Porsgrund municipality for the year 1855. He also held the position of vice mayor in 1854, 1858, 1863, 1864 and 1866.

He was also active in a local branch of the Norwegian Seamen's Mission.
