= Jørleif Uthaug =

Norwegian artist (1911–1990)

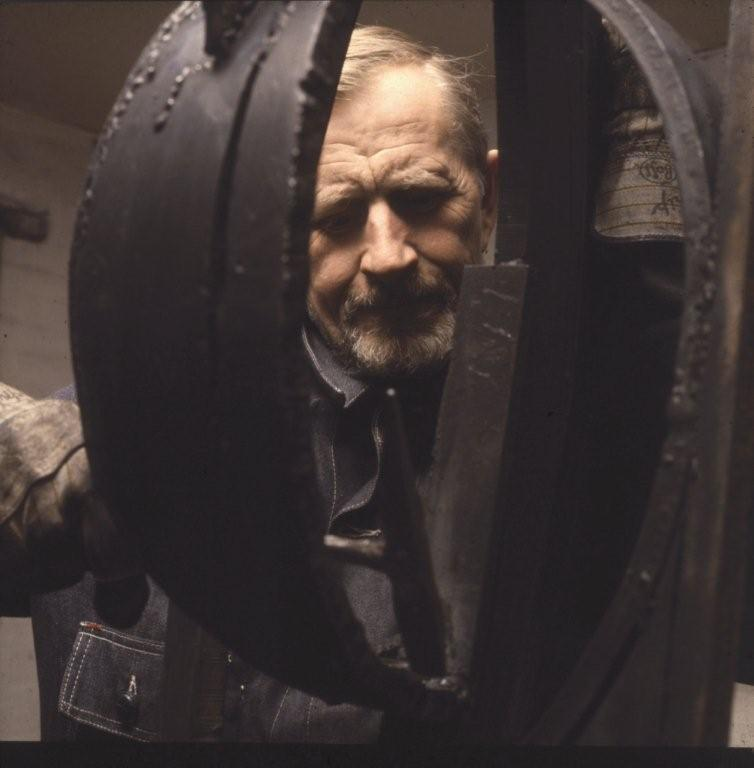
- Born: 3 August 1911; Brekstad, Norway
- Died: 25 August 1990 (aged 79)
- Occupations: Illustrator, painter, sculptor

Jørleif Uthaug (3 August 1911 – 25 August 1990) was a Norwegian illustrator, painter and sculptor.

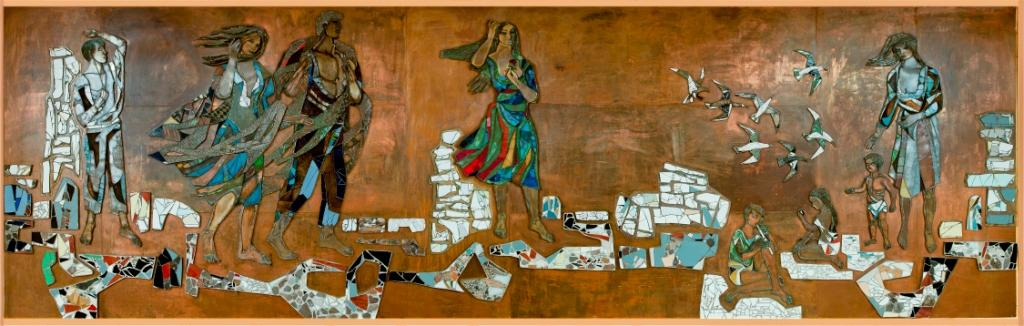
People on the shore (1961)

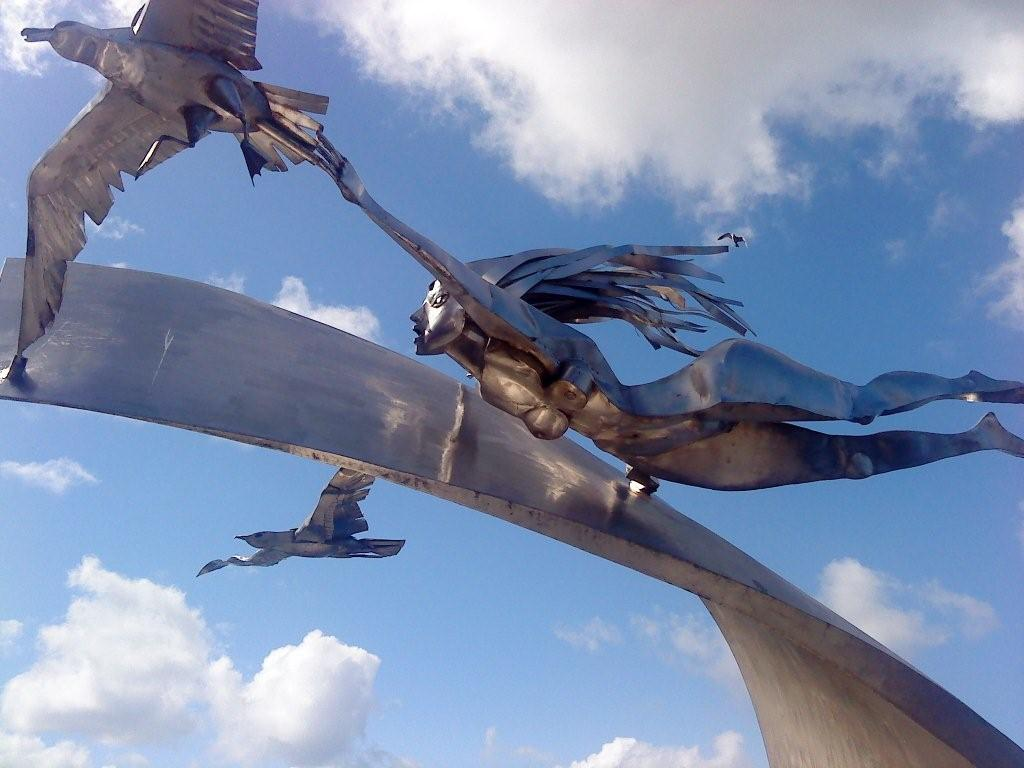
Amphitrite, the wave and the sea birds (1985)

== Biography ==
He was born at Brekstad in Ørland Municipality in Sør-Trøndelag, Norway. He was the son of Daniel Meier Uthaug (1886–1977) and Anne Johanne Grande (1890–1962). He taught at Trondhjem Technical College (1932), at Stabell's School of Design (1934–1935) and at Trondhjem Technical Middle School (1936).

He studied at the Norwegian National Academy of Fine Arts under Per Krohg and Axel Revold (1941–43), then under Jean Heiberg (1945–1947). He made his debut as an artist in 1948 at the Trondheim Art Association. He had his first solo exhibition in 1949 at Galleri Per in Oslo. He studied metallurgy and welding at the Swedish Institute of Technology (1960–1961).

== Personal life ==
He was married twice. First with Ingeborg Aaberg, the marriage dissolved in 1950. In 1950 with Guri Eve Christopherson (1923-2010). He was a father of author, translator and literary critic Geir Uthaug (born 1950). He died during 1990 and was buried at Vestre gravlund in Oslo.

== Legacy ==
In connection with the 100th anniversary in 2011, the second biography about him was published, written by his son Geir Uthaug. The first was published for his 70th birthday in 1981. Jan Christian Mollestad has made the documentary film "Jørleif Uthaug, a modern classic". On the occasion of the 100th anniversary, three exhibitions of Uthaug's works were also opened: the exhibition "The artist behind the wall of Tromsø" at Nordnorsk Kunstmuseum; the exhibition "Jørleif Uthaug, a classic modernist" at Ørland Cultural Centre, and an exhibition of sculpture, painting, drawing and graphics at Galleri KS Tønsberg.

== Selected works ==
- People on the shore - Fylkestingssalen in Tromsø (1961)
- Amphitrite, the wave and the sea birds - Strandpromenaden in Porsgrunn (1985)
- Hellebard - Lambertseter in Oslo (1983)
