= Hans Møller =

Norwegian politician (1830–1911)

Hans Møller (1830–1911) was a Norwegian politician, consul and businessperson.

== Personal life ==
Hans Møller was born to Hans Eleonardus Møller (1804–1867) and Amborg Laura (1803–1889), née Aall. As such his grandfathers were ship-owner Hans Eleonardus Møller, Sr. and statesman Jacob Aall. He had one brother Jacob Aall Møller.

He married Marie Krohn from Skien.

== Career ==
His most notable role was that of mayor of Porsgrund municipality, a position he held in the years 1863–64, 1866, 1868–69, 1871, 1873, 1875, 1877, 1879, 1881–83 and 1885–90. He alternated with merchant Niels Mathiesen. As such Møller was vice mayor in 1862 as well as every year up to and including 1884 in which he was not mayor. He was elected to the Norwegian Parliament in 1871 and 1877, representing the constituency of Porsgrund.

Outside politics he was a businessman, surviving the economic depression both as a shipbuilder, ship-owner and timber merchant. In 1872 he became manager of the marine insurance company Det Norske Lloyd, following the death of his brother Jacob. His brother had already succeeded their father upon his death in 1867. Hans Møller was also the French consul in the city.
