= Norwegian Hull Club =

Norwegian Hull Club - Gjensidig Assuranseforening
- Company type: Mutual
- Industry: Insurance
- Founded: 2001
- Headquarters: Bergen, Norway
- Area served: Global
- Key people: Hans Christian Seim (CEO)
- Number of employees: 136 (2020)
- Subsidiaries: Marine Benefits AS, Insurance Technology Solutions
- Website: www.norclub.com

Norwegian Hull Club (NHC) is a mutual insurance company based in Norway. The company operates within the marine and offshore energy segments offering Hull & Machinery, Loss of Hire, Total Loss, War, Offshore Energy, Construction All Risks, Yachts, P&I and other related insurances.

The Head Office is in Bergen, with additional national offices in Oslo, Kristiansand and London.

NHC is a member of the Central Union of Marine Underwriters (CEFOR) and the International Underwriting Association (IUA).

== History ==
The first Norwegian assurance associations for ships were first established in 1806. In 1837, Langesundfjordens Skibs Assuranceforening (later called Den Første Norske Assuranceforening) and Skibsassurance-foreningen in Arendal were founded.

In the mid nineteenth century, the fleet of steamships in Norway expanded rapidly and the fastest growth was seen in Bergen. To cover the increasing need of insurance for locally owned steamships, Bergen Dampskibs-Assuranceforening was founded in 1879. Meanwhile, insurance clubs also appeared in other parts of the country. Within a short time, Skibsassuranceforeningen Vidar (est. 1895) became a central actor in the insurance market on the east coast of Norway.

Bergens Assuranceforening and Bergens Dampskibs-Assuranceforening merged in 1937 to form Bergen Hull Club. In 1951, UNITAS was formed through a merger of several clubs on the east coast of Norway led by Skibsassuranceforeningen Vidar. In the following years, UNITAS merged with the remaining clubs on the east and south coasts of Norway and became lead underwriter for nearly 900 vessels.1

In January 2001, Bergen Hull Club and UNITAS merged to establish Norwegian Hull Club.

== Organisation ==
As a mutual insurance company, NHC is owned entirely by its policyholders. The governing bodies of the Club are the Board of Directors, the Committee, the Election Committee and the General Meeting. The highest authority of the Club is the General Meeting.

NHC insures more than 10.000 vessels and units in total. More than 6000 of these are on Claims Lead basis with NHC.

In June 2023 Standard & Poor's Ratings Services confirmed its long-term counterparty credit and insurer financial strength ratings of Norwegian Hull Club. The rating remains an 'A' with a stable outlook.

Norwegian Hull Club operates within Hull & Machinery, Loss of Hire, Total Loss, War, Offshore Energy, Construction All Risks, Yachts, P&I and other related insurances.
