= Robert Rafn =

Norwegian businessperson and politician

Robert Rafn (27 February 1878 – 1964) was a Norwegian businessperson and politician for the Conservative Party.

He was born in Porsgrund as a son of shipmaster Hans Christian Rafn (1833–1899) and Hanna Annette Halvorsen (1847–1939). He took technical education in Norway in 1895, and graduated in 1898 from Technicum Mittweida. From 1899 to 1905 he worked as an assistant of Thomas A. Edison in Orange, New Jersey. He later worked as a chemist at a works in Berlin before running his own company named Irradiar in Nuremberg until 1915. He returned to Norway and settled in Moss. He was a manager at Moss Melkefabrik from 1916 to 1924 and technical director at Moss Aktiemølle from 1925 to 1945. He was also a supervisory council member of Hafslund. After 1945 he worked as a consultant.

From 1925 to 1931 he was a member of the executive committee of Moss city council. He chaired the local party chapter from 1934 to 1937. In the 1936 Norwegian parliamentary election he was elected to the Parliament of Norway from the Market towns of Østfold and Akershus counties. Absent for most of 1938 and 1939, Rafn's seat was filled by Carl Sigurd Winther and Ragnhild Rød.

Rafn married a daughter of Jørgen Christian Knudsen, who was himself a brother of Gunnar Knudsen and son of Christen Knudsen. Rafn was a brother-in-law of Finn Christian Knudsen and Christen Knudsen, Jr. He died in 1964 and is buried in Porsgrunn.
