= Østre Porsgrunn Church =

Church in Telemark, Norway

- Østre Porsgrunn kirke Østsiden kirke
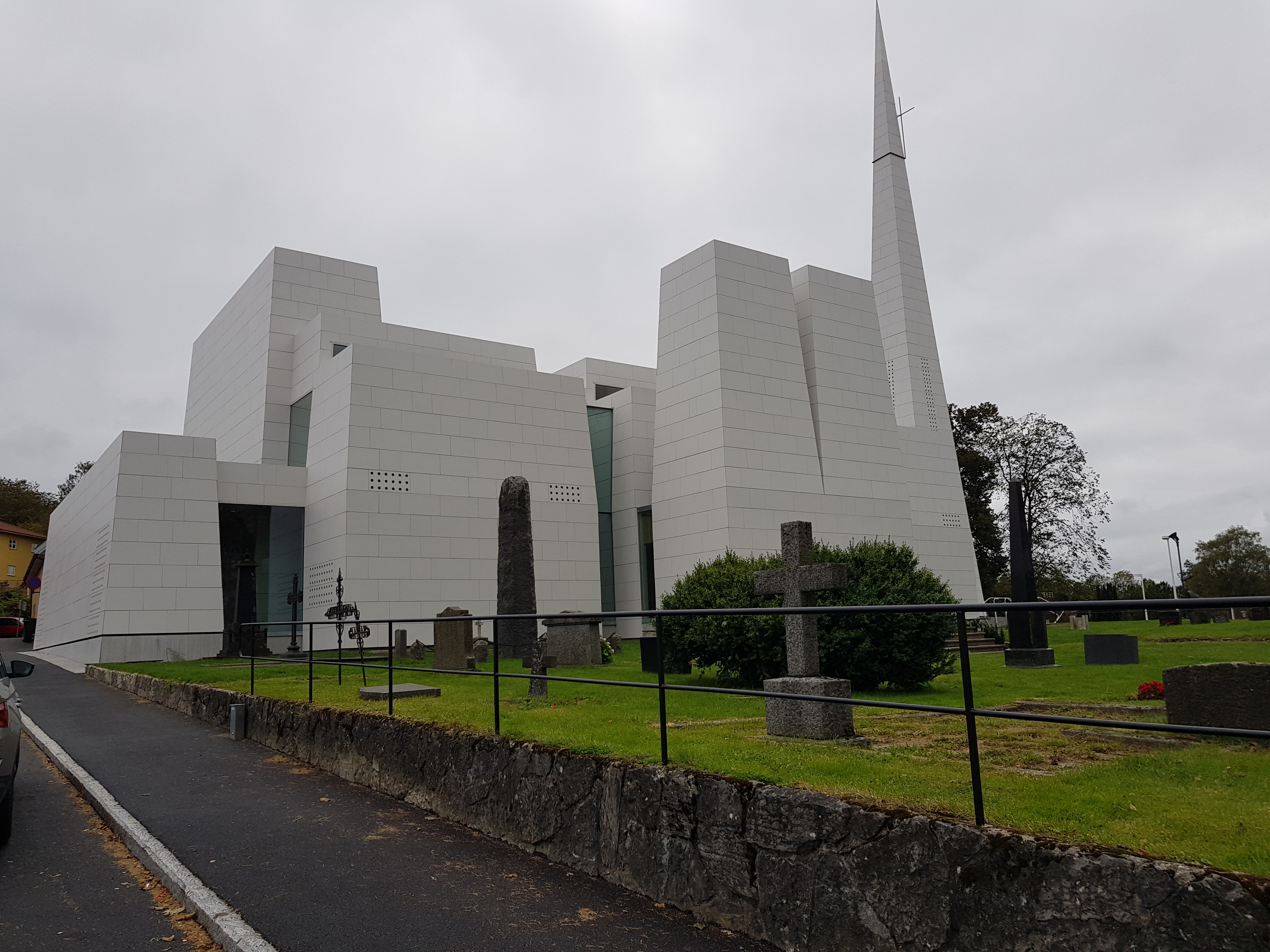
- View of the church
- Østre Porsgrunn Church
- 59°08′10″N 9°38′53″E
- Location: Porsgrunn Municipality, Telemark
- Country: Norway
- Denomination: Church of Norway
- Churchmanship: Evangelical Lutheran
- Website: porsgrunn.kirken.no

History
- Former name: Jesu Kirke i Østre Porsgrunn
- Status: Parish church
- Founded: 1760
- Consecrated: 15 Sept 2019
- Events: 2011: Church fire

Architecture
- Functional status: Active
- Architect: Espen Surnevik
- Architectural type: Rectangular
- Completed: 2019 (7 years ago)

Specifications
- Capacity: 500
- Materials: Concrete

Administration
- Diocese: Agder og Telemark
- Deanery: Skien prosti
- Parish: Porsgrunn
- Norwegian Cultural Heritage Site
- Type: Church
- Status: Not protected
- ID: 85920

Østre Porsgrunn Church (Norwegian: Østre Porsgrunn kirke; also known as Østsiden kirke) is a parish church of the Church of Norway in Porsgrunn Municipality in Telemark county, Norway. It is located in the town of Porsgrunn. It is one of the two churches for the Porsgrunn parish which is part of the Skien prosti (deanery) in the Diocese of Agder og Telemark. The white, concrete church was built in a modern, rectangular design in 2019 using plans drawn up by the architect Espen Surnevik. The church seats about 500 people.

The church is located in the Kirkehaugen district of Eastern Porsgrunn. The church sits just east of Fylkesvei 356 at Kirkebakken 17. In 2011 the old Rococo style church that was built in 1760 was completely destroyed by a fire. A new building was completed on the same site in 2019.

== History ==
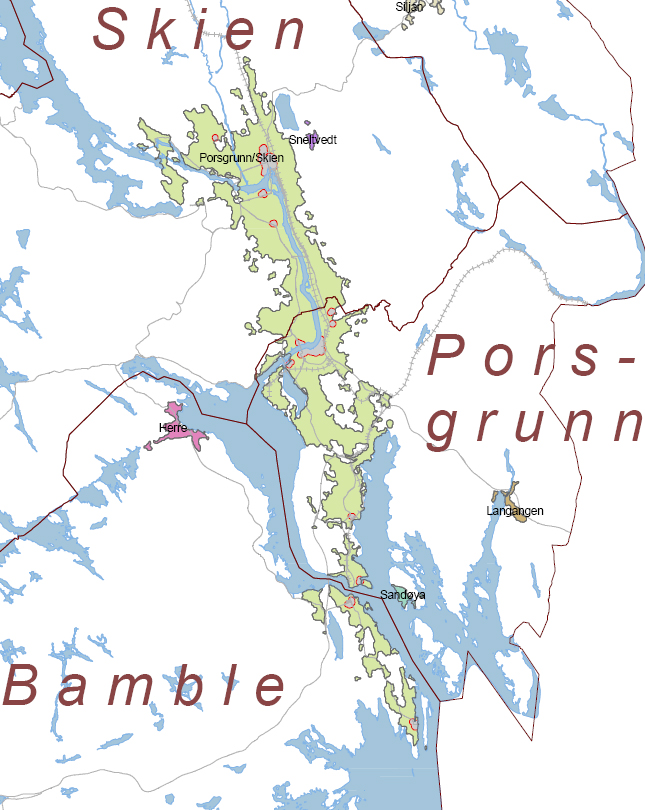
A map of the municipalities of Porsgrunn, Skien, and Bamble, with the green representing urban area. Eastern Porsgrunn is considered to be anything east or south of the main river (river located slightly north of center).

=== First church ===
==== Planning ====
In the mid-1700s, the wealthy population of Porsgrunn wanted a new church on the east side of the growing urban area. The reason for this was mainly prestige but also politics, as the building of a grand church in Porsgrunn would prove that the growning village was prosperous enough to be a town in its own right (Porsgrunn is located a short distance from the city of Skien). Also, despite the fact that Vestre Porsgrunn Church had recently been built, there was no bridge across the Porsgrunn River, so the residents of eastern Porsgrunn had to travel all the way to Eidanger Church in Eidanger to worship.

The idea for a church on the east side of Porsgrunn was a few years in the making, but came to fruition due to the influence and capital of a few of the area's wealthy merchants, shipowners, and ironworks owners. On 9 August 1754, a message urging residents to donate towards a new church was sent out by four of Porsgrunn's most important men, all of whom were successful businessmen with connections to Danish royalty. The men were: Danish brothers Carl Deichman and Wilhelm Deichman, literary publishers and co-owners of Fossum Ironworks in Skien, Ulrich Frederik Schnell, owner of Næs Ironworks in Holt, and customs officer Thomas Lange. The fundraising campaign was a huge success, and within a short time, the men had collected between four and five thousand rigsdaler for the church. The land that was to be the future site of Østre Porsgrunn Church was donated by Friederich Biener, who owned the land as part of his Jønholt farm and used it as a pen for his horses.

Since they now had the land and the funds required, the new committee for Østre Porsgrunn Church just needed permission from the Dano-Norwegian government to begin construction. In 1755, they sent a petition to King Frederik V in Copenhagen. After four years, on 16 March 1759, they finally got a response, with the king giving the plan his endorsement. The plan would also need to be signed by the local government, and Bent Bentzen, who was the stadtholder in Skien at the time, reluctantly agreed, saying, "I cannot see why the construction of a church in the suburb of Porsgrunn would be necessary, except to reduce Skien, one of the oldest cities in the country, into a pile of rubble."

The merchants who funded the church enlisted local Skien resident Joen Jacobsen as the master builder for this project, who had proven himself a capable engineer and builder working on Brevik Church and Langesund Church in the years prior. Jacobsen had just finished work as master builder on the Vestre Porsgrunn Church in 1758 when he drafted up architectural plans for the new church in eastern Porsgrunn. However, when he sent his drawings in for approval, he was puzzled to find that the Danish architects had sent them back marked full of corrections.

Jacobsen had originally planned to make the church very similar to his previous one in western Porsgrunn, with a traditional Norwegian rectangular long church floor plan that represented the sacred road. However, the architects who were responsible for reviewing the plans, renowned architect Lauritz de Thurah and his apprentice Andreas Pfützner, wanted the church much bigger and with a cruciform floor plan. The architects assumed the church would be built using stone as most were in Denmark, and completely overlooked the limitations of wood in construction. Not wanting to upset the elite in Denmark, Jacobsen kept the revised plans. This meant the church was the largest wooden church in Telemark, but also one of the largest in all of Norway.

==== Construction ====
Due to the constraints of the revised architectural plans, Joen Jacobsen had to be creative with his carpentry techniques. Since timber framing techniques were not yet commonplace in Norway, Jacobsen was constrained to building with logs that were paneled with cut planks on the exterior walls. However, the plans specified right-angled corners, which, while easy to achieve with other materials, was more difficult with wood, since the common saddle notch joint left excess wood protruding from either side of the corners. Subsequently, Jacobsen took advantage of precise cutting techniques from the sawmills in Skien to make use of lap joints (Norwegian: sinklaft) for the logs, almost half a decade before the technique was in common use.

The church's steeple was topped with a copper-clad Baroque spire with a unique profile. On top of that lay an elaborate ornamental iron weather vane which was the work of local blacksmith Hans Christian Arveschoug.

Construction on Østre Porsgrunn Church began in 1759 and was completed the next year. The total construction cost came out to 5,836 rigsdaler, 3 ort, and 11 skilling. The church was consecrated on 10 July 1760, an event that was presided over by Bishop of the Diocese of Christiania, Frederik Nannestad. Østre Porsgrunn and Vestre Porsgrunn became their own parishes in 1763, with the death of Jørgen Herman Monrad, parish priest of Eidanger, and in 1764, Jeremias Hagerup became the first parish priest of Østre Porsgrunn parish.

The church was restored and remodeled several times. The first time was in 1888. The second was in 1960, on the 200th anniversary of the church's construction, where it underwent major structural repairs that finished in 1966. After that, there were minor repairs in 1997, when two of the planks in the corners were replaced. Lastly, in 2011, the church was undergoing a further multi-million kroner structural repair following its 250th anniversary in 2010, during which the church was burnt to the ground.

==== Features ====
Exterior

The 1760-church was formally named Jesu Kirke i Østre Porsgrunn. It had a Rococo style to its design. The wooden building had a floor area of 450 square metres (4,800 sq ft). The church had a 5-metre (16 ft) tall copper spire on top of the bell tower.

Interior

As is characteristic of many of Joen Jacobsen's churches, the church had a wooden barrel vault ceiling, and it was painted with depictions of the sky and angels. The altarpiece was built in 1890 and painted with an image of Jesus on the cross by esteemed Norwegian romantic nationalist painter Axel Ender. The retable that framed the altarpiece was donated by Niels Aall. It was in Baroque style, with two Ionic order pilasters on either side and above it an arched architectural motif superimposed with a cloud shining light to represent God. Surrounding the altar was a semicircular wooden balustrade that served as an altar rail, thought to be another contribution of Jacobsen's. There were two figurines on either side of the retable, one of Moses and the other of Aaron. These were donated by local entrepreneur Nicolai Benjamin Aall, brought back from a trip to the Netherlands.

The pulpit was located in one of the interior corners of the crucifix, between two arms of the cross. It was a carved wooden pulpit in the Rococo style, ornamented with round mirrors and gold leaf. The church also contained a pipe organ, which was built by a royal organ builder from Copenhagen. The organ alone made up about one-third of the church's building expenses, and it later received a decorative organ case created by Daniel Wroblewsky. The organ was replaced with a new one around 1850. The organ was replaced in the early 1980s by Bruno Christensen retaining its organ case and several registers.

Churchyard

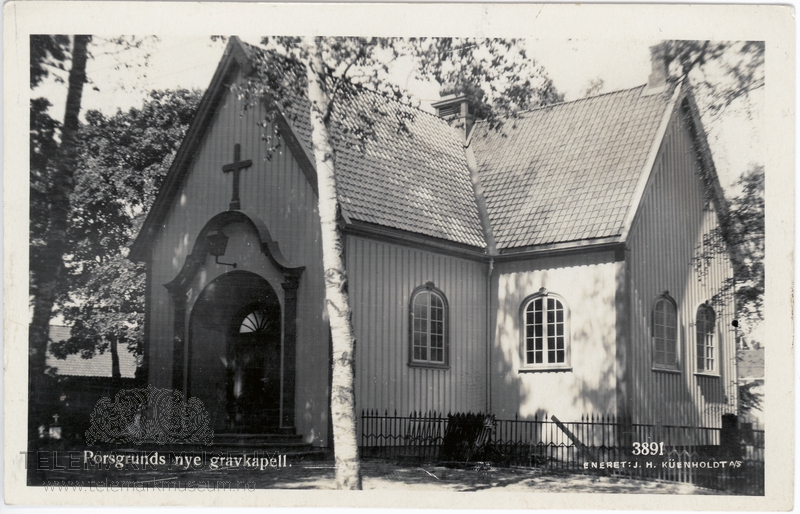
The funeral chapel built in 1921

The majority of the church grounds are used as a graveyard. The first person buried there was Søfren Nielsen (in 1860). He was a merchant from the farm Floodegården. Other notable people buried in the graveyard are the town's richest man at the time, Nicolai Benjamin Aall (in 1798), shipowner and politician Jørgen Aall (in 1833), and former Minister of the Navy in Norway, Jens Schou Fabricius (in 1841).

There is also a small chapel for funerals located across the street from Østre Porsgrunn Church, but still on church land. The chapel was built in 1921 by Haldor Larsen Børve, a local architect who was also responsible for Vår Frue Church down the road, as well as bigger projects such as Dalen Hotel and the new Porsgrunn City Hall. (The chapel was not damaged by the fire in 2011 and has subsequently been brought back into use following volunteer work by the congregation.)

==== Fire ====
On the night of 11 April 2011, Østre Porsgrunn Church was set on fire. The local police were notified at 3:15 in the morning, but when a nearby patrol unit arrived a few minutes later, the fire was already quite large. The police proceeded to evacuate the surrounding neighborhood. By the time the spire collapsed, the building was judged not to be a potential risk of fire spread to the wooden buildings nearby. The evacuation order was called off at 5:07, by which time the church had completely burnt to the ground. Parish priest Per Johan Wiig arrived at the site as soon as he heard the news. He said of the incident, "It is very sad, especially for all those who had planned to have baptisms, confirmations, and weddings at the church." He went on to say, "What's special about these old churches is that they're not museums, but it is a building that has been in use almost every day for 250 years. And through both joys and sorrows."

The estimated value of the church was 41 million kr, which consisted of 29 million kr for the building and 12 million kr for the interior decoration and furnishings. The most valuable items in the church were the organ, altar, and the pulpit, at an estimated value of 6.5 million kr, 1.3 million kr, and 1.2 million kr respectively. The only things saved from the church were a small silver baptismal font and some silver cups and plates used for communion, all objects from 1760 that were kept in a fireproof cupboard. The insurance sum came out to 30 million kr, as only the building was covered and not the inventory. The money was designated to be used towards building a new church.

The fire was suspected to be as a result of arson, as the fire started from the outside of the church and the fast rate at which the fire spread indicated the possible use of an accelerant. The same night, there had also been an attempted arson about 6 kilometres (3.7 mi) away, at Borgestad Church in Skien, but only a few benches there were damaged. The police revealed that two boys, aged 17 and 18, were suspected of both incidents. Earlier that night, the 17-year-old suspect had written on Facebook, "Now we're going out to play pyromaniac." He later confessed to the arsons at both Borgestad Church and Østre Porsgrunn Church, under pressure from his mother. The 18-year-old's DNA was discovered on a scarf near the scene of the Borgestad arson, but he still denied involvement. The two suspected arsonists were put on trial at Nedre Telemark District Court, with proceedings beginning on 21 February 2013. The younger suspect was sentenced to three and a half years in prison, and the older four years in prison, and the boys also must pay 34 million kr in damages. The older suspect has appealed the verdict, and the younger boy has appealed the compensation sum.

=== Second church ===
==== Planning ====
There was a good amount of debate over whether the church should be rebuilt as a copy of the original or if a more modern church should be built in its place. The planning committee involved in the church's reconstruction advised the parish council against making an exact replica of the old church, but encouraged keeping some of the old elements, such as a prominent tower and organ. However, others wanted the church to be rebuilt for its historical value, similar to how Fantoft Stave Church was rebuilt in 1997 after it too was destroyed by arson. While others, such as the local branch of the Rødt party in Porsgrunn, believed that the church should not be rebuilt at all, but instead the land would be used for some secular purpose.

During a meeting in the autumn of 2014, the church congregation in attendance agreed to build a new church following the suggestion of the building committee, for a new building meeting the requirements of function and form, rather than for a historic reconstruction. Following this decision the building committee has selected several architect firms to design a new building with a May 2015 deadline, based on the churches requirements, with a final decision made in June 2015. In June, the design competition was completed and Espen Surnevik was announced as the winner with his design: "Reis Opp".

In September 2016, it was announced that (following consultation with the construction company) the church building design had to be modified in order stay within budget. To reduce costs (1) a portion of the church building has been removed, reducing its footprint, and as a consequence (2) the nearby church hall will be no longer be redesigned.

==== Construction ====
After a few years of delays due to planning and bureaucratic delays, work on the new church took place from December 2017 until the autumn of 2019. The concrete building is clad on the outside with tiles reminiscent of porcelain. The modern-style tower of the new church is placed in exactly the same place where the tower stood in the old church. Likewise, the church's main entrance is located in exactly the same place. The new church's tower is 36 metres (118 ft) high. The new building was consecrated on 15 September 2019.

==== Church organ ====
In March 2016, the competition process for the church's new organ began. In May 2016 the organ builder Weimbs was confirmed as the winner. The delay of the contract and construction phase the church building created a one year delay for the organ project. Funding for the organ was completed relatively quickly, thanks to major donations provided by Sparbank 1 Stiftelsen and Sparbank 1 Grenland. The organ contract was finally signed during spring 2018, however the extra delay and variation in the exchange rates raised the final cost of the project from 7 million kr to a reported 7.7 million kr.

The organ was installed in the fully built Østre Porsgrunn Church during the height of Norway's second Covid wave during winter 2020. The organ was digitally consecrated (due to continued covid-19 restrictions) in a service on 18 April 2021 with organist John Beech. The inauguration concert was finally performed on 29 August 2021 by the organ consultant Karstein Askeland, together with soprano and violinist Liv Elise Nordhaug. Several concerts were planned for the new instrument throughout the autumn.

== Media gallery ==
Current church

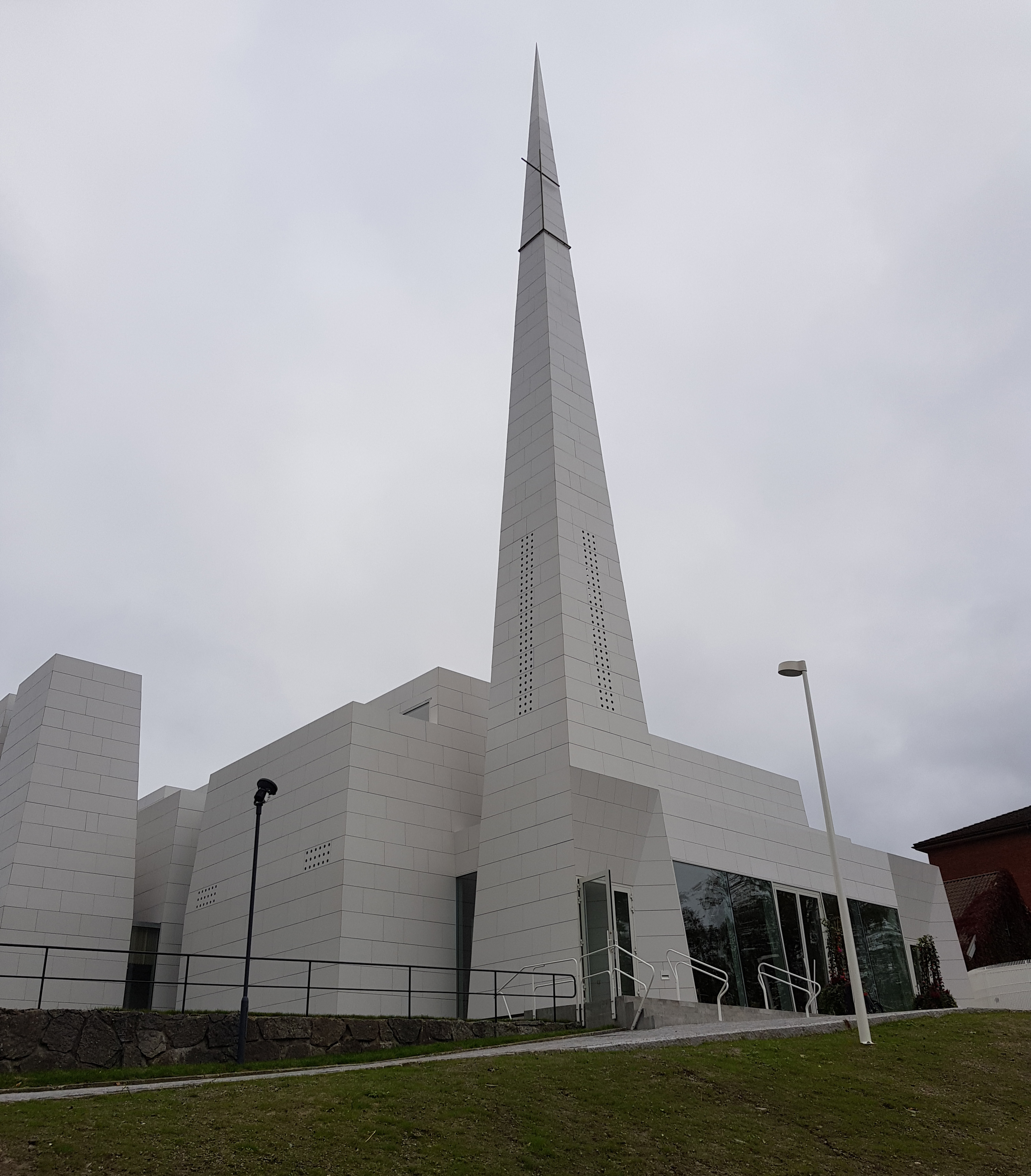

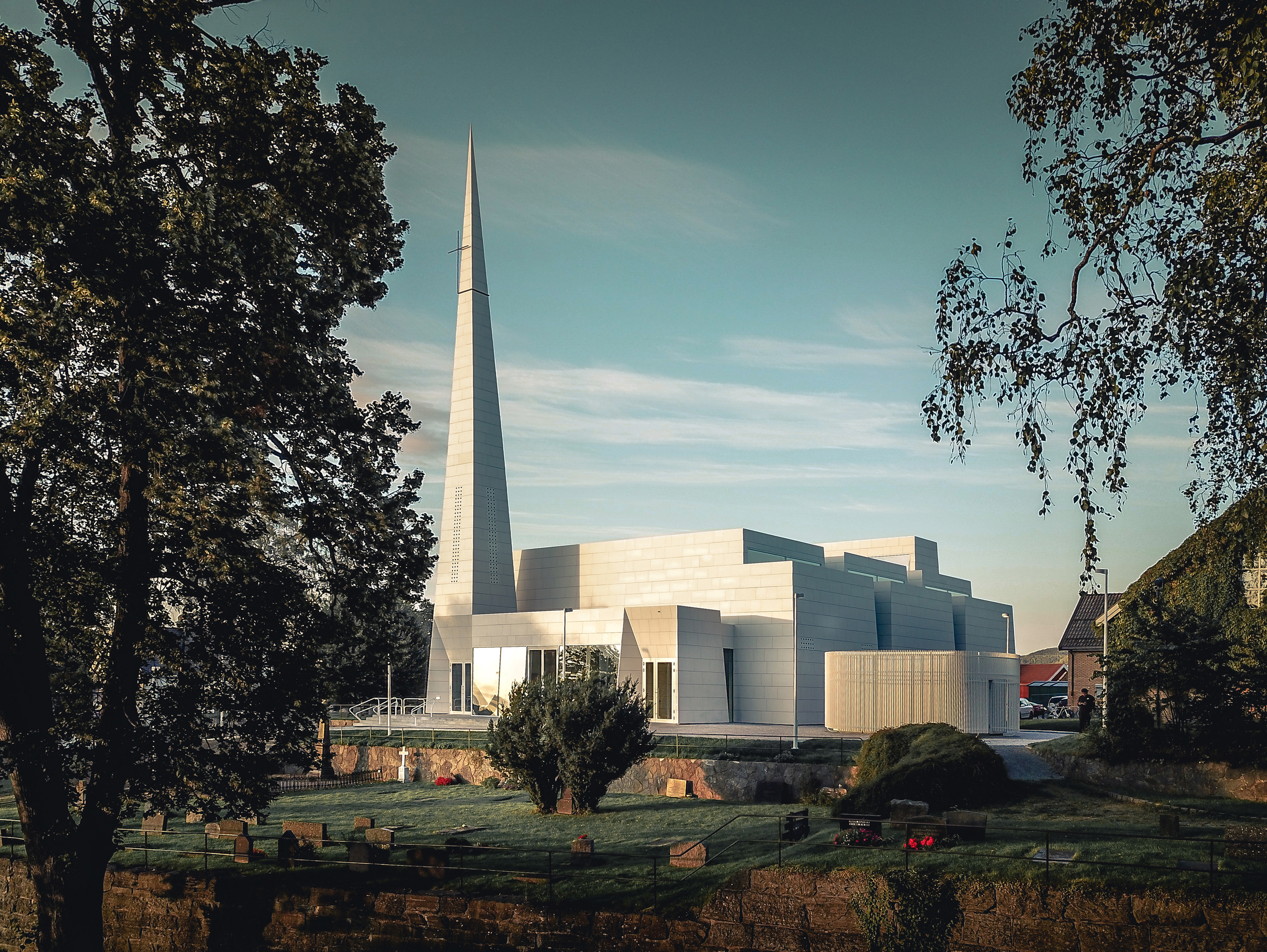

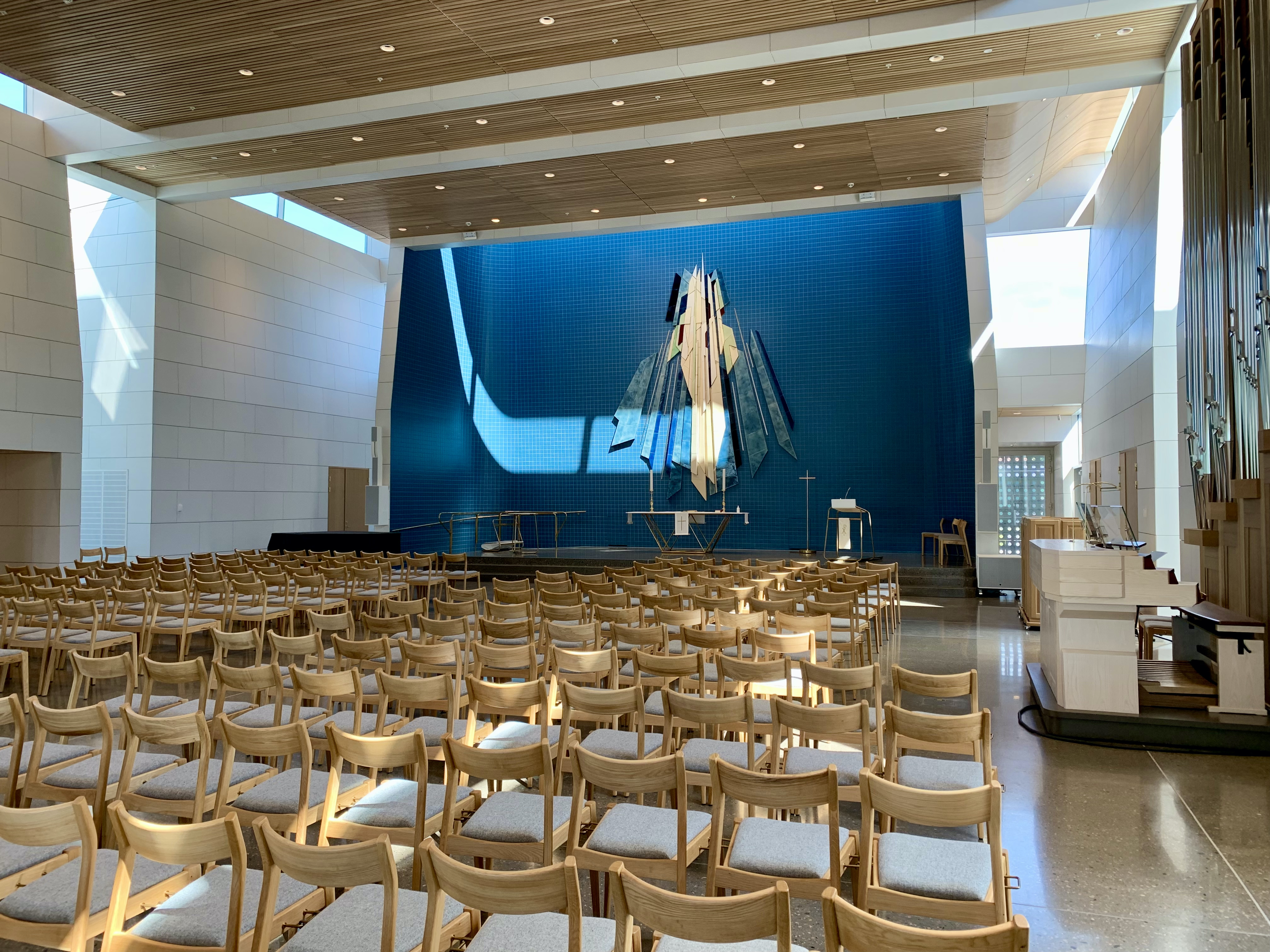
Old church 1760-2011

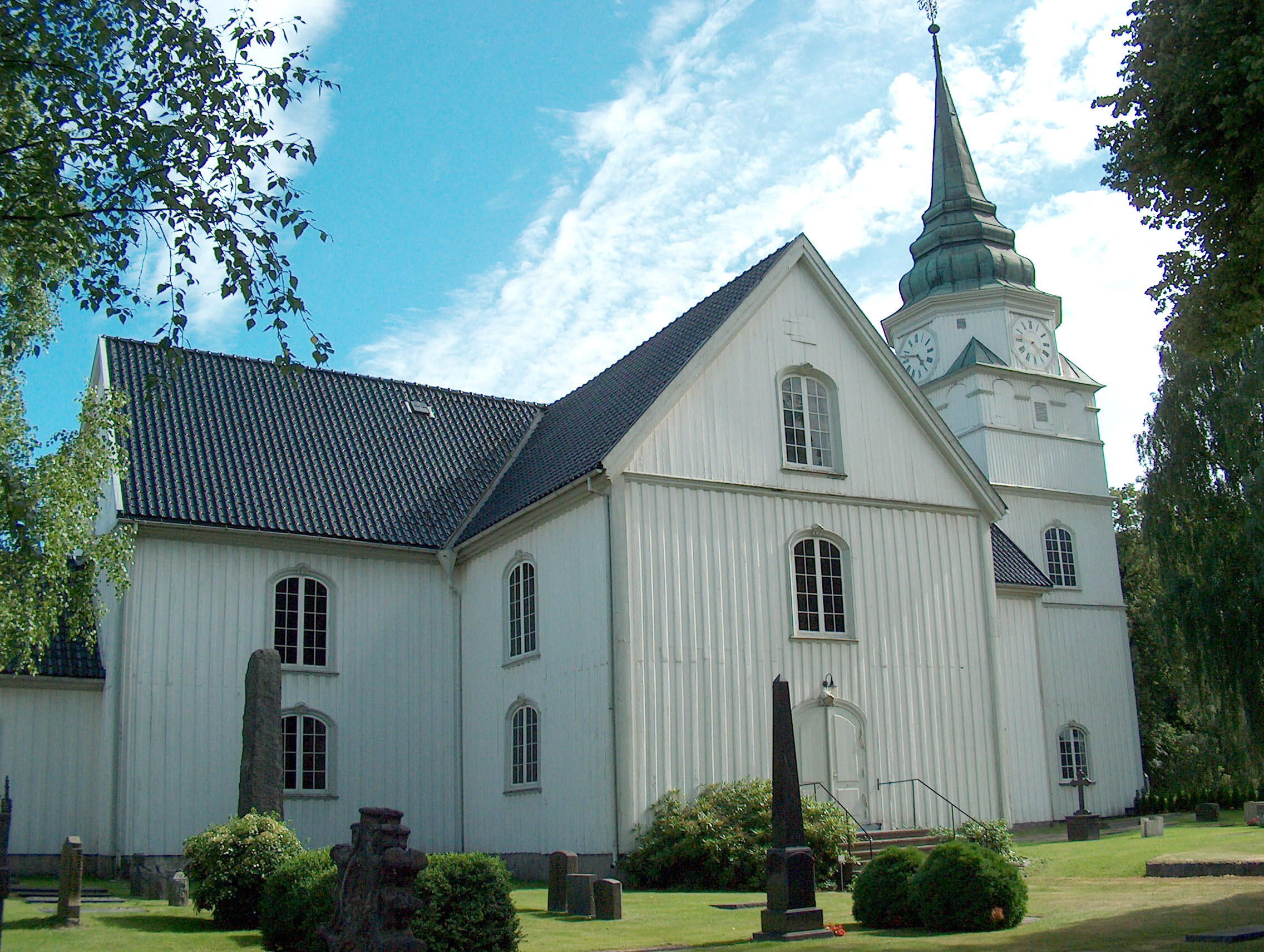

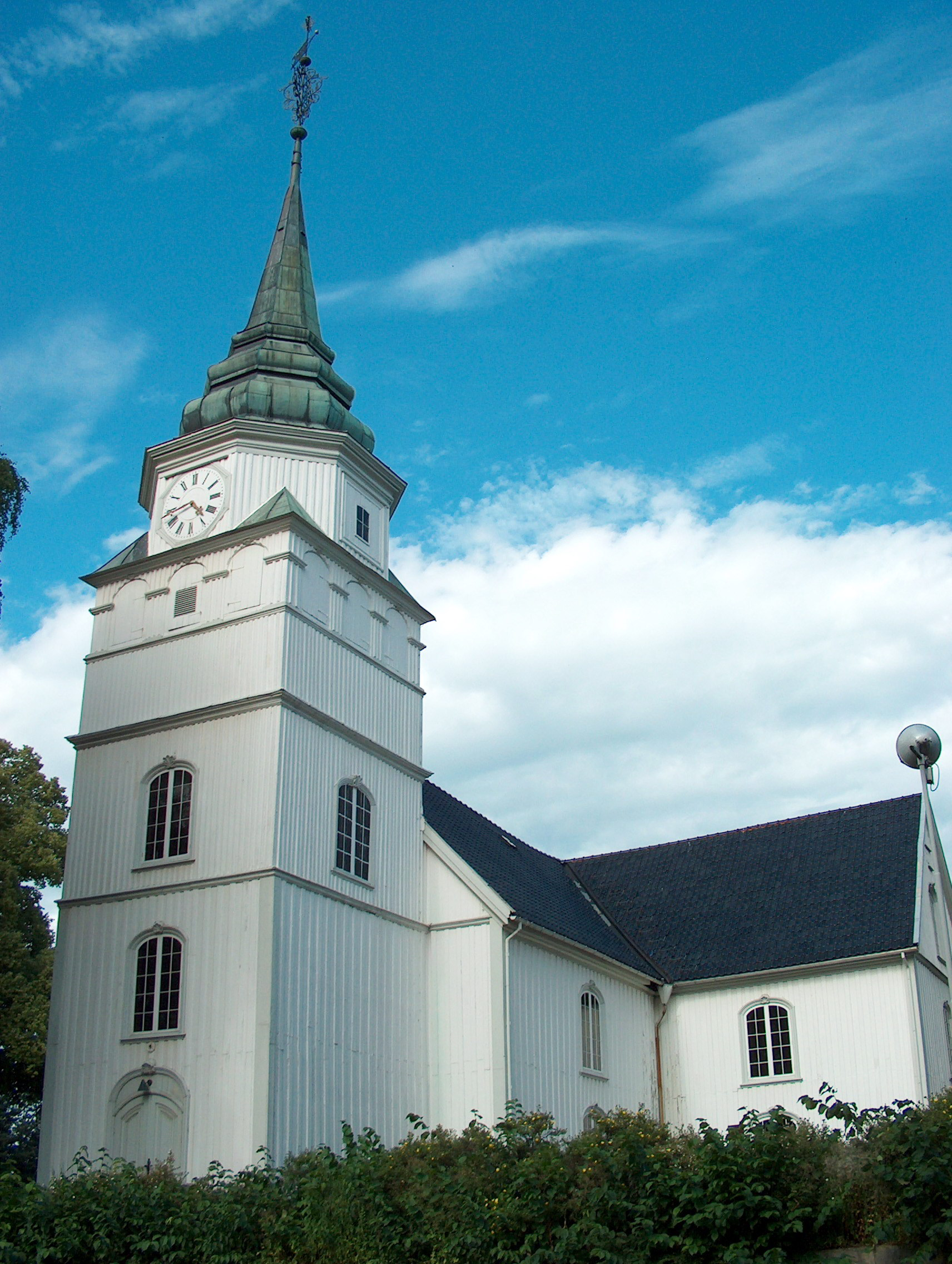

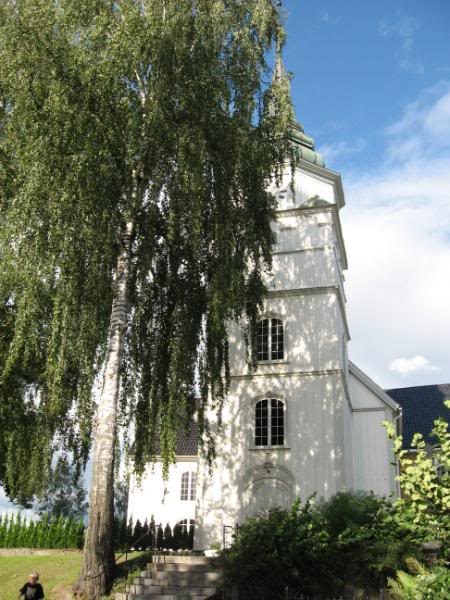

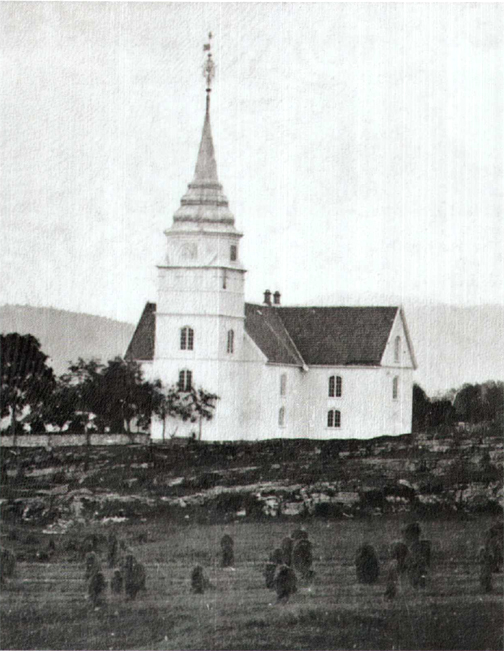

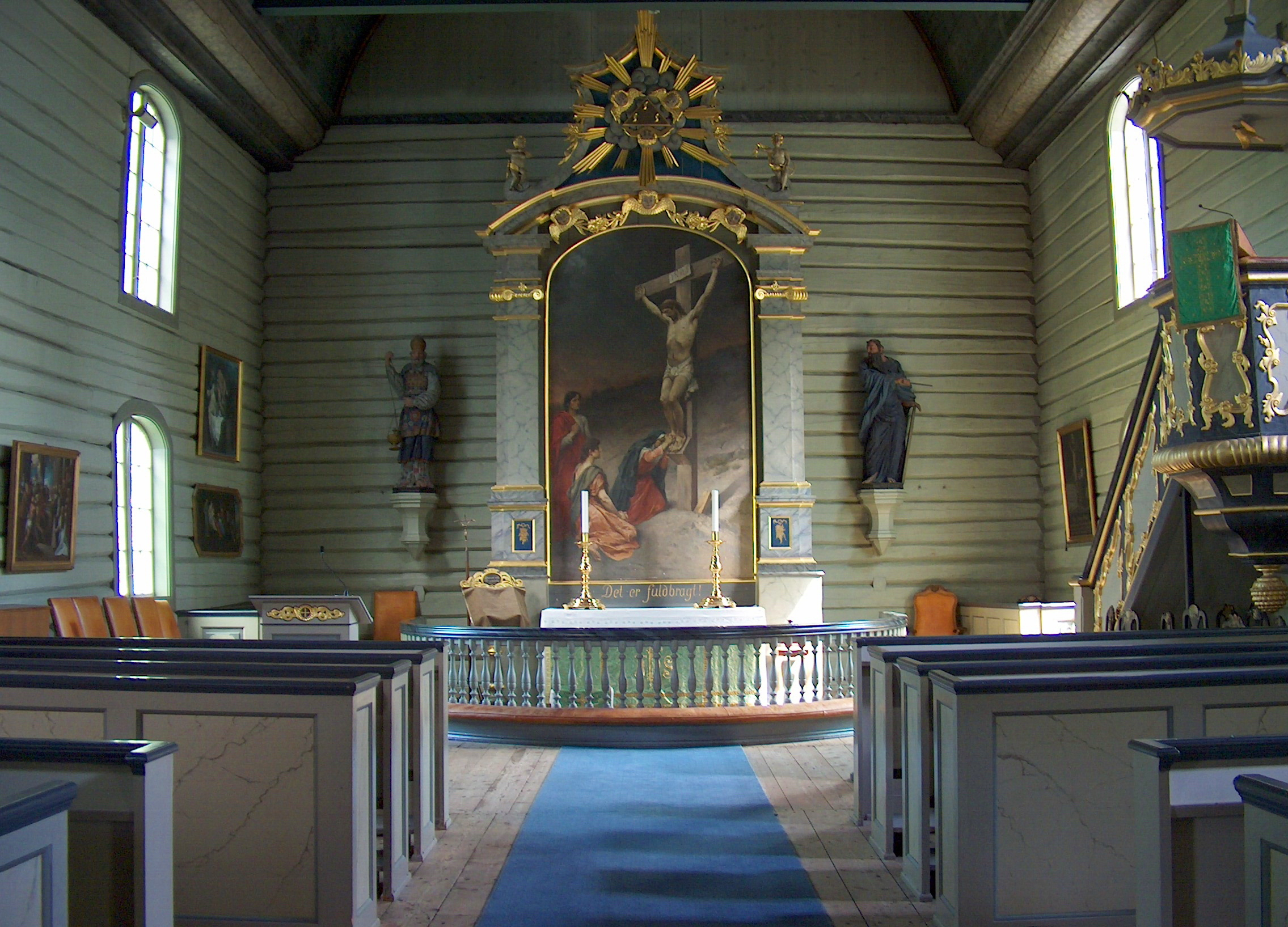

== See also ==
- List of churches in Agder og Telemark
