= Christen Knudsen Jr. =

Norwegian politician

Christen Knudsen
- Born: 17 December 1873; Frednes, Porsgrunn, Norway
- Died: 1964 (aged 90–91)
- Occupations: Ship-owner, Politician
- Political party: Conservative Party, Nasjonal Samling

Christen Knudsen (17 December 1873 – 1964) was a Norwegian ship-owner and politician for the Conservative Party and later Nasjonal Samling.

== Personal life ==
He was born at Frednes in Porsgrunn as a son of ship-owner Jørgen Christian Knudsen (1843–1922) and Marie Henriette Resch (1846–1925). He was a brother of Finn Christian Knudsen, grandson of Christen Knudsen, nephew of Prime Minister Gunnar Knudsen and Johan Jeremiassen.

He was married to Lavinia Laura Franklin and had several children, among them Harald Franklin Knudsen.

== Career ==
After middle school in 1889 he travelled abroad to learn foreign languages until 1890. He spent time in England, Scotland, Germany, France and the Mediterranean. He then worked in his father's shipping company from 1890. When his father died in 1922, the company was passed on to Christen and his brother Finn. He was also consul for the United Kingdom in Skiensfjorden from 1910 to 1940. He translated books from English and French, and published a lexicon for merchantry and shipping (a re-issue of a work by C. F. Berg) in 1909. He chaired the supervisory council of AS Borgestad, Porsgrunds Sparebank and Porsgrunds Handelsbank.

In politics, he served as member of Porsgrunn city council from 1916 to 1922 and 1928 to 1937, being deputy mayor from 1931 to 1933. He also held a number of other municipal posts, including public trustee. He was elected to the Parliament of Norway in 1924 from the Market towns of Telemark and Aust-Agder counties and took a seat in the Standing Committee on the Military. He was not re-elected in 1927, but served that term until 1930 as a deputy representative.

His main interest being defence policy, he had been a member of the Defence Commission of 1920 which advised Parliament on post-World War I defence policies. In the 1930s he was a council member of Norges Forsvarsforening, chairing the local branch in Porsgrunn from 1912 to 1934. He also co-founded the shooting association Porsgrunn Skytterlag, and was further involved in sports as chair of the club Porsgrunds IF from 1900 to 1903 and co-founder of the association football club Porsgrunds FK.

During the occupation of Norway by Nazi Germany, Knudsen became a collaborator, serving as acting County Governor of Telemark in 1940.

During the legal purge in Norway after World War II he was sentenced in October 1947 to seven years of forced labour, loss of civil rights and a monterary confiscation. He was buried in 1964 in Østre Porsgrunn.
