= Joen Jacobsen =

Norwegian master builder

- Born: 1714; Skien, Norway
- Died: 12 January 1768 (aged 53–54)
- Occupation: Master builder

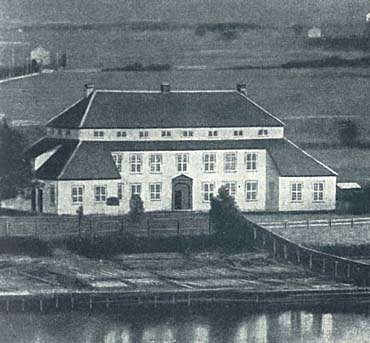
Kammerherregården was built in 1760 by Joen Jacobsen. It was destroyed in a fire in 1901, and rebuilt as the current Porsgrunn City Hall.

Joen Jacobsen (1714 – 12 January 1768) was a Norwegian master builder.

He was born in Skien to carpenter Jacob Vetlesen. He was responsible for the construction of a number of churches in Telemark, including Langesund Church (from 1753 onwards), Vestre Porsgrunn Church (1756–1758), Østre Porsgrunn Church ( finished 1760) and Solum Church (finished 1766). He also restored Borgestad Manor in 1760, and built Kammerherregården, which was destroyed by fire in 1901 and rebuilt as the current Porsgrunn City Hall.
