= Herman Jeremiassen =

Norwegian ship-owner and politician

Herman Jeremiassen (born 1851 in Hviteseid, died 1943) was a Norwegian ship-owner and politician.

== Personal life ==
Herman Jeremiassen was born in Hviteseid to teacher's seminary leader Knut Johan Jeremiassen and Ingeborg Ellse, née Helseth. The family moved to Drammen around 1855. Herman and his brother Johan Jeremiassen later moved to Porsgrund.

Jeremiassen married Alice Resch, daughter of captain Hagbarth Resch. Alice's sister Marie married Jørgen Christian Knudsen, whose sister Serine married Herman's brother Johan.

== Career ==
Coat of arms of Porsgrunn, ratified by mayor Herman Jeremiassen and King Oscar II.

Like his brother, Herman Jeremiassen was a notable ship-owner.

As a politician Herman Jeremiassen was mayor of Porsgrunn Municipality from 1900 to 1907. He was a conservative. During his time as mayor, Porsgrunn got its coat of arms, a power plant among other things.
