= Customs House, Porsgrunn =

Customs House
- Tollboden
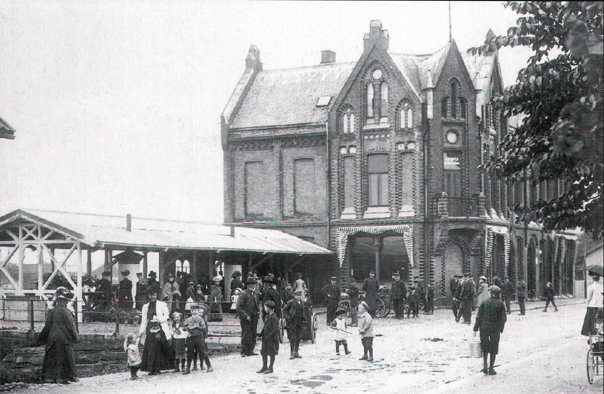
- Customs House in the early 1900s. To the left is the Torvhallen market, later home to a taxi stop and Narvesen kiosk.
- Former names: Reformgården, Samlagsgården

General information
- Status: Completed
- Type: Customs house
- Architectural style: Neo-Gothic
- Location: Storgata 162, Porsgrunn, Norway
- Coordinates: 59°8′30″N 9°39′18″E
- Opened: 1891
- Renovated: 1949-1953, 1999
- Client: Porsgrunds Brændevinssamlag
- Owner: Statsbygg Sør

Technical details
- Floor area: 1,341 m^{2} (14,430 sq ft)

Design and construction
- Architect: Haldor Larsen Børve

The Customs House (Norwegian: Tollboden) is a historic building in Porsgrunn in Telemark county, Norway. It was built in 1891 by architect Haldor Larsen Børve and used as a liquor store and restaurant until 1903, when the city took it over for use as a customs house. The building, which now holds offices for Statsbygg Sør, is located on Storgata 162, along the banks of the Porsgrunn River and just across from Porsgrunn City Hall.

== History ==
In 1848, a consortium of shipowners and captains bought a plot of land between Storgata and the Porsgrunn River and built a shipyard there, which they named "Reform." Starting a new shipyard at the time was a risky proposition, and initially their investment paid off, with six ships launched from the facility over a period of just five years. However, their luck soon ran out, and in 1853 all operations stopped entirely, the workforce was laid off and the warehouses, near modern-day Reynoldsparken, were closed.

In order to cut down on seedy bars and liquor stores, the Norwegian parliament passed a law in 1871 that gave local governments permission to establish an organization ("samlag") with exclusive rights to sell and serve liquors in a municipality. The idea of having a government-sanctioned monopoly of alcohol sales in a city was inspired by the Swedish system and was a precursor to the modern Vinmonopolet, with the difference being that most of the profits went to local governments rather than the state government. In the spring of 1873, Porsgrunds Brændevinssamlag was created to capitalize on the new law, and in 1887 they received a licence to become the sole alcoholic beverage retailer in Porsgrunn. The samlag was very successful, and over the 24 years that it was in operation, it raised a total of 105,000 kroner for the city. The profits went towards road maintenance, social services, and above all, construction, funding in part the construction of a local library, swimming hall, and rail line between Porsgrunn and Larvik.

In the 1880s, the city announced their plans to build a new wharf, called Østre Porsgrunn Dampskipsbrygge, on the plot of the old "Reform" shipyard. Porsgrunds Brændevinssamlag acted quickly, purchasing a neighboring property in anticipation of the resulting influx of passengers. In 1891 they enlisted local architect Haldor Larsen Børve to build on their new centrally located property. This was Børve's first major project as part of his newly formed architectural firm, which would later go on to build the new Porsgrunn City Hall across the street as well as many other local buildings, such as the Vår Frue Church. The resulting Neo-Gothic brick building, referred to colloquially as "Samlagsgården" or "Reformgården," contained three restaurants and a liquor store.

However, by the end of the 1800s, public attitudes had turned against the samlag due to a growing temperance movement in the city. The movement, which objected to the samlag on moral grounds, was especially strong in Porsgrunn due to the efforts of local resident Carl Reynolds, founder of the Norwegian chapter of the International Organisation of Good Templars. Their efforts paid off on 10 April 1897, when a local referendum to break up the samlag and prohibit all sale and serving of liquor in the city passed with a 124 vote majority.

=== Customs house ===
The city had been looking for a new customs house to replace the old one in Frednes (now part of the Porsgrunn Maritime Museum), since it was considered too far away from the center of town. The location near the steamship wharf was seen as ideal, since it was very centrally located and saw a lot of boat traffic. In 1899, they bought a nearby plot of land with the intention of building a new customs house, but soon afterwards they got an offer to buy the old samlag building, to be renovated and furnished at the seller's expense. A 1902 report from Statens bygnignsinspektorat, the precursor to Statsbygg, said that since Reformgården was "particularly well-suited for the customs house and other public offices, it is advisable that [the government] take over Reformgården. It will never be built-in, and the government will have free access to the steamship pier."

When the Porsgrunn City Hall across the street burned down on 9 December 1901, many of the city's services needed new office space. The police force moved temporarily to another building while the new city hall was constructed, but it was decided to move the local post office permanently, with Reformgården as its new home. In 1904, the post office was joined by offices for the district court and the national telegraph company, Televerket. The new owners of the property, Norwegian Customs (Norwegian: Tollvesenet), moved into the building on 1 July 1904, which they bought for a sum of 63,500 kroner.

The customs building housed these various government offices for many years, but slowly the other tenants began to move their operations elsewhere. First to go was the Televerket offices, which moved to a new building between Stangsgate and Skolegata where the local telephone exchange stood. Next went the post office, moving to the low building just north of the Customs House, and when the district court offices left, Norwegian Customs were the only tenants left in the building.

Between 1949 and 1953 a small extension was built on the basement level at the back of the building, out towards the river. The Customs Office, which had been part of the Larvik Customs District since its inception, became part of Skien Customs District in 1969 and remained under its jurisdiction until 1993. Between 1993 and 1995, further restructuring of the districts took place and the Customs House became part of the newly created Telemark and Vestfold Customs District. In 1997, the customs office in Porsgrunn was deemed no longer necessary and closed, and the building once again lay vacant.

=== Recent history ===
The Customs House was bought by Statsbygg in 1999 as office space for their Statsbygg Sør division. With the help of Amlie's architectural firm in Stathelle they immediately conducted extensive restoration of the building's interior. The windows and all of the interior and exterior doors were taken out and replaced with new replicas. Some of the original features, such as the elaborately detailed ceilings, wall panels, and main staircase, were repaired and restored. Some parts of the interior were torn out, such as many non-load-bearing walls, ceilings, and floors that were mainly from the 1950s to 1980s. The building was also fitted with modern amenities such as HVAC, an elevator, and a fire sprinkler system.

In 2000, the property came under the ownership of Entra Eiendom when the company split from Statsbygg and acquired all its commercial real estate. Statsbygg Sør's offices remained in the building, now leased from the new owners. The brick facade underwent repairs in 2003. The property returned to Statsbygg ownership on 31 December 2009, when the agency bought the building for a sum of 14.6 million kroner. The agency had nine months left on the lease but felt it prudent to buy the building for the financial advantage as well as to oversee the preservation of the historic building.

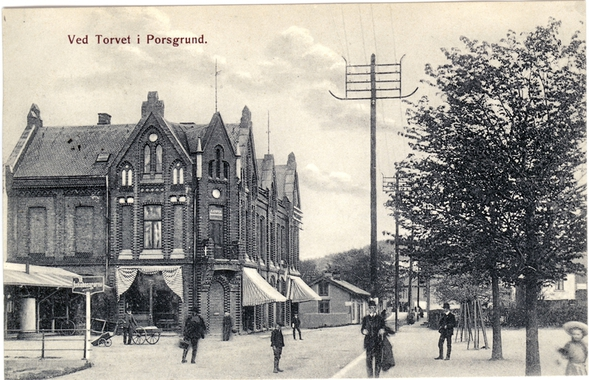
A postcard depicting the Customs House on Storgata. Some of the figures in the photo were added by the photographer.

== Architecture ==
The Customs House is a brick building in the Hannover-school Neo-Gothic style that displays many elements typical of the architectural style, including extensive use of steep gables, recessed wall surfaces, and Gothic pointed arches and window designs. The building is built with red brick alternating in parts with black glazed brick for contrast. The Customs House's main facade facing Storgata has two tall gables on either side and a lower gable in the center. The corner facing Porsgrunn City Hall is cut at a 45-degree angle to the other walls and is topped with a weather vane marked with 1891, the year of the building's completion. The corner also once featured a small balcony that has since been removed. One feature of the building that was very modern for the time was the use of cast iron on the building's exterior, specifically the columns that separate the double windows on the first floor. The columns are marked with "Porsgrunds mek. Værksted," which was a local foundry once located at the end of Porselensvegen, down the street from Porsgrunds Porselænsfabrik.
