= Finn Christian Knudsen =

Norwegian politician

- Born: 13 October 1868; Porsgrunn, Norway
- Died: August 24, 1955 (aged 86)
- Occupations: Engineer; Politician
- Parent: Jørgen Christian Knudsen
- Relatives: Christen Knudsen (grandfather); Christen Knudsen Jr. (brother); Gunnar Knudsen (uncle)

Finn Christian Knudsen (born 13 October 1868 – dead 24 August 1955) was a Norwegian engineer and politician.

He was born in Porsgrunn. He served as mayor of Eidanger Municipality from 1907 to 1910, and from 1916 to 1919. He was elected representative to the Storting for the period 1922–1924, for the Conservative Party.

== Selected works ==
- Eidanger-Porsgrund (1932)
