= Carl Sigurd Winther =

Norwegian businessman and politician (1887–1962)

Carl Winther

Carl Sigurd Winther (6 October 1887 – 22 December 1962) was a Norwegian businessperson and politician for the Conservative Party.

He was born in Fredrikshald as a son of businessperson Christian Winther (1859–1939) and Anna Høstgaard (1859–1931). He took the middle school exam in 1903, and also had training as a petty officer. He started his career in his father's factory, and took over the factory in 1918.

He was a member of Sarpsborg city council from 1922. From 1923 to 1931 he chaired the local party chapter. He was a deputy representative to the Parliament of Norway from the Market towns of Østfold and Akershus counties during the term 1937–1945, and met regularly for Robert Rafn in 1938 and 1939.

He was a board member of the Norwegian Gymnastics Federation from 1922 to 1925, and chaired the sports club TIL National after the Second World War. During the war he enrolled in the Norwegian forces during the Norwegian Campaign. After the Norwegian forces lost the campaign, he joined the Norwegian resistance movement. He came close to being apprehended and had to flee to Sweden on 29 January 1945. He died in December 1962 and is buried in Sarpsborg.
