= Porsgrunn City Hall =

Building in Porsgrunn, Norway

- Porsgrunn rådhus
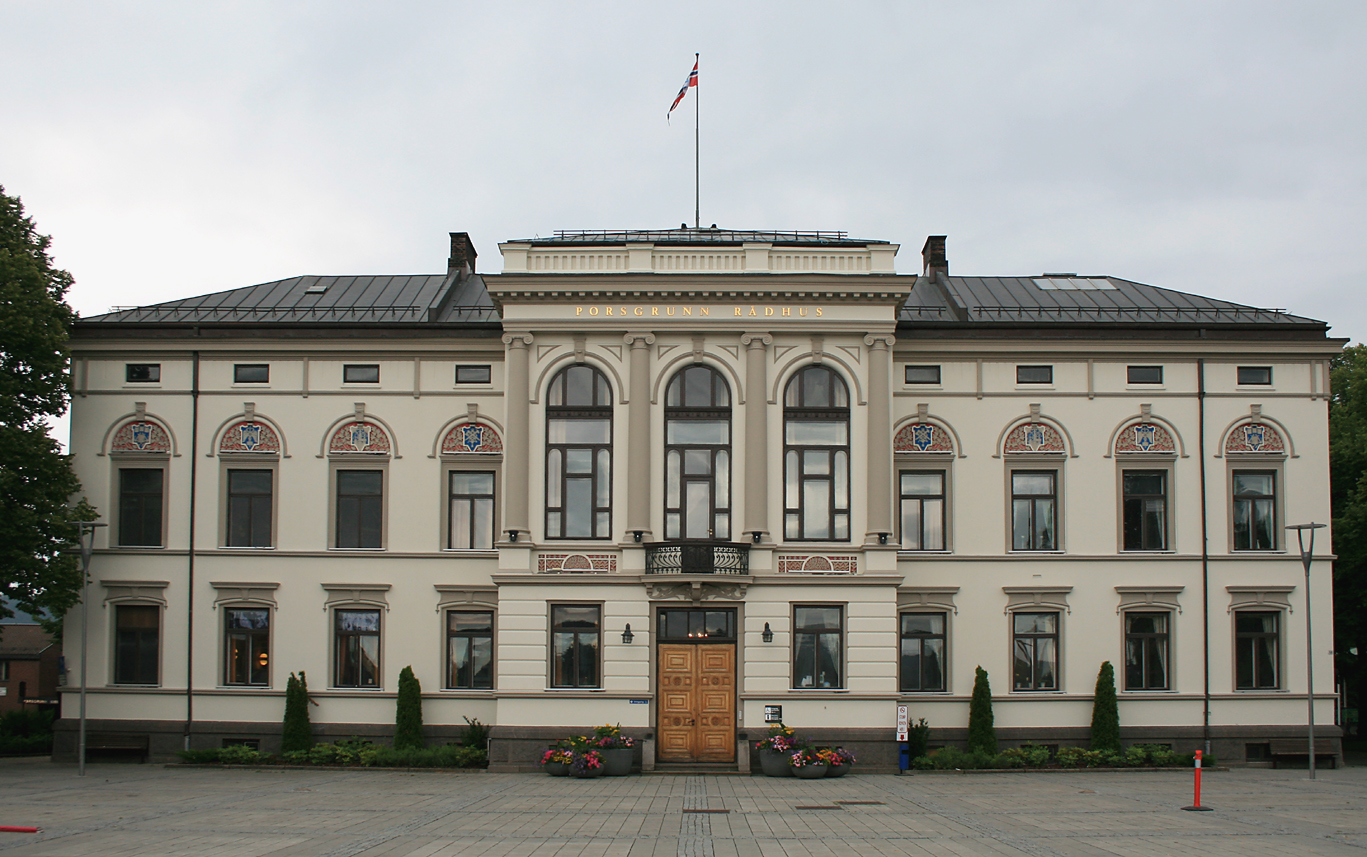
- Porsgrunn City Hall in 2007

General information
- Status: Completed
- Architectural style: Neo-Renaissance with elements of Art Nouveau
- Location: Rådhusgata 1, Porsgrunn, Norway
- Coordinates: 59°8′28″N 9°39′19.5″E
- Current tenants: Porsgrunn City Council
- Groundbreaking: 3 Mar 1904
- Inaugurated: 20 Jun 1905
- Owner: Porsgrunn municipality

Design and construction
- Architect: Haldor Larsen Børve

Porsgrunn City Hall is the seat of government for Porsgrunn Municipality in Telemark county, Norway. The current city hall was constructed in the town of Porsgrunn in 1905 after the original building was destroyed in a fire. The building is situated at the intersection of Storgata and Rådhusgata in eastern Porsgrunn.

== History ==
=== Original building ===
The first city hall in Porsgrunn was originally part of a farm called the Chamberlain Estate (Norwegian: Kammerherregården). The farmhouse was built for Niels Aall between 1763 and 1765 by the master builder Joen Jacobsen, who was famous for building Grenland churches such as Østre Porsgrunn Church. Jacobsen built the farmhouse using the pattern of Herregården, a count's manor house in Larvik, after which he had also modeled the house at Borgestad Farm in Skien a few years earlier. The mansion was an example of classic Telemark architecture, with its distinctive H-shaped floor plan and steep hip roof in the seteritak form, characterized by two slopes of roof separated by a vertical wall.

In 1777, the farm was passed down to Niels' son, Jacob Aall (uncle of the historian of the same name), who sold the farm ten years later to his brother-in-law, Severin Løvenskiold (father of the politician of the same name). Løvenskiold was a chamberlain (Norwegian: kammerherre) under the Danish crown, thus giving the farm its name. In 1814, Løvenskiold moved to his property at Fossum Ironworks in Fossum and gave the farm to his two sons, Niels and Fritz Løvenskiold. The farm was later sold to Jacob Grubbe Ottesen in 1823 and then to the newly formed Bratsberg formannskapsdistrikt in 1838 for a sum of 2,200 speciedaler.

Soon, however, the municipal government found themselves cramped in the building and were in desperate need of office space. In 1882, the building was completely remodeled and expanded under the leadership of architect Henrik Thrap-Meyer. The building was remade into a more contemporary style and was completely unrecognizable from the old one, but still kept the name Kammerherregården. On 9 December 1901, the building burned to the ground, and it was decided that a new city hall should be built on the same plot.

=== Modern city hall ===
On 9 January 1903, the final decision was made to rebuild the city hall, and the city commissioned local architect Haldor Larsen Børve to design the new building. Børve had made a name for himself with the construction of the luxury Dalen Hotel in Tokke Municipality as well as several local churches in Grenland, such as Vår Frue Church in Porsgrunn built a few years earlier. The cornerstone was laid down on 3 March 1904, and the building was inaugurated on 20 June of the next year.

The city hall building is in the Renaissance Revival architectural style with decorative elements taken from Art Nouveau. The main building material used is plastered brick. The building has a symmetrical facade with a protruding central section that faces Storgata and out to Porsgrunn River. The central section is composed of four decorative columns around three large arched windows, with a balcony protruding from the central window that is decorated with wrought iron Art Nouveau patterns. The recessed parts on either side of the building feature smaller windows, and the arches above the second floor windows are each decorated with the coat of arms of Porsgrunn surrounded by pors branches.

In addition to city administration offices, the city hall houses a theatre and for many years also had classrooms for the Porsgrunn Navigation School (Norwegian: Navigasjonsskolen i Porsgrunn). One notable alumnus of the school is Carl Reynolds, founder of the Norwegian chapter of the IOGT temperance movement who caused the dissolution of the Porsgrunds Brændevinssamlag and is memorialized in Porsgrunn with a statue created by sculptor Trygve Thorsen. In 2007, to mark the 200th anniversary of Porsgrunn's city status, the square near the city hall was renovated and stairs were built leading down to the river path.

== Historical images ==
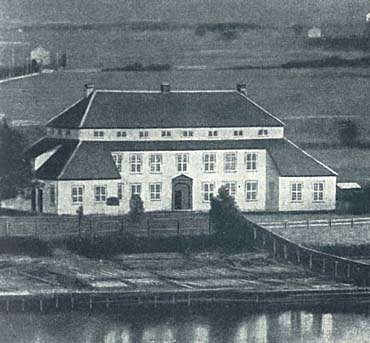
A depiction of the original Chamberlain Estate from 1779.

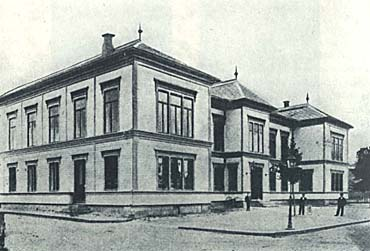
The city hall after its remodeling in 1882.

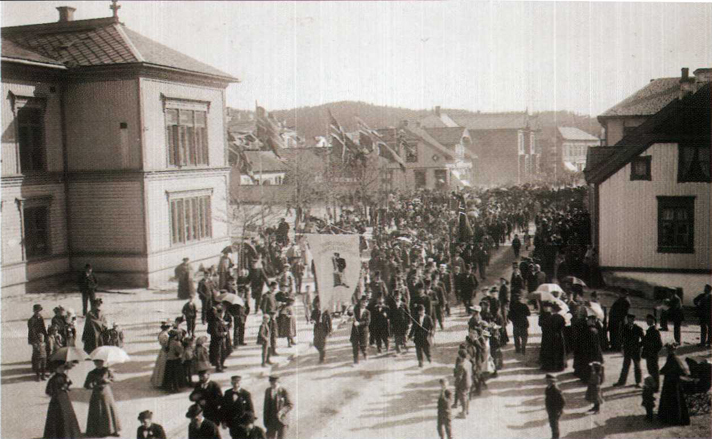
Norwegian Constitution Day parade on 17 May 1896 passing near the city hall (on the left).

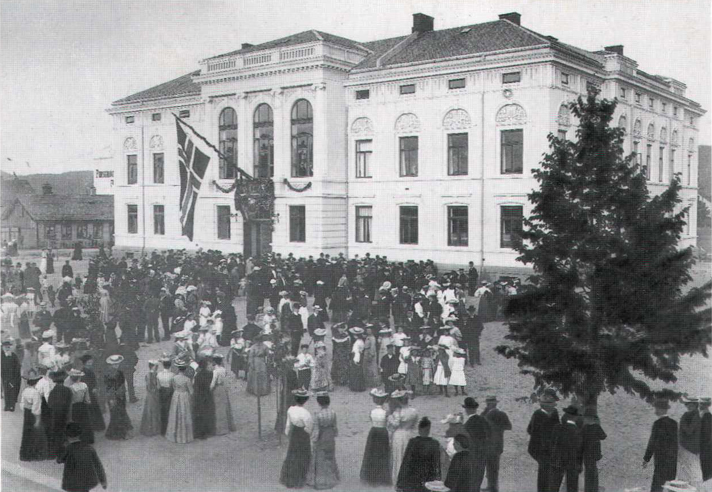
Modern city hall in August 1905 during the referendum for the dissolution of the Norwegian-Swedish union. The tree and some of the people in the foreground were added by the photographer to give "life" to the picture.
