= Porsgrund Porcelain Factory =

Norwegian ceramics company

Coordinates: 59°08′27″N 9°38′24″E

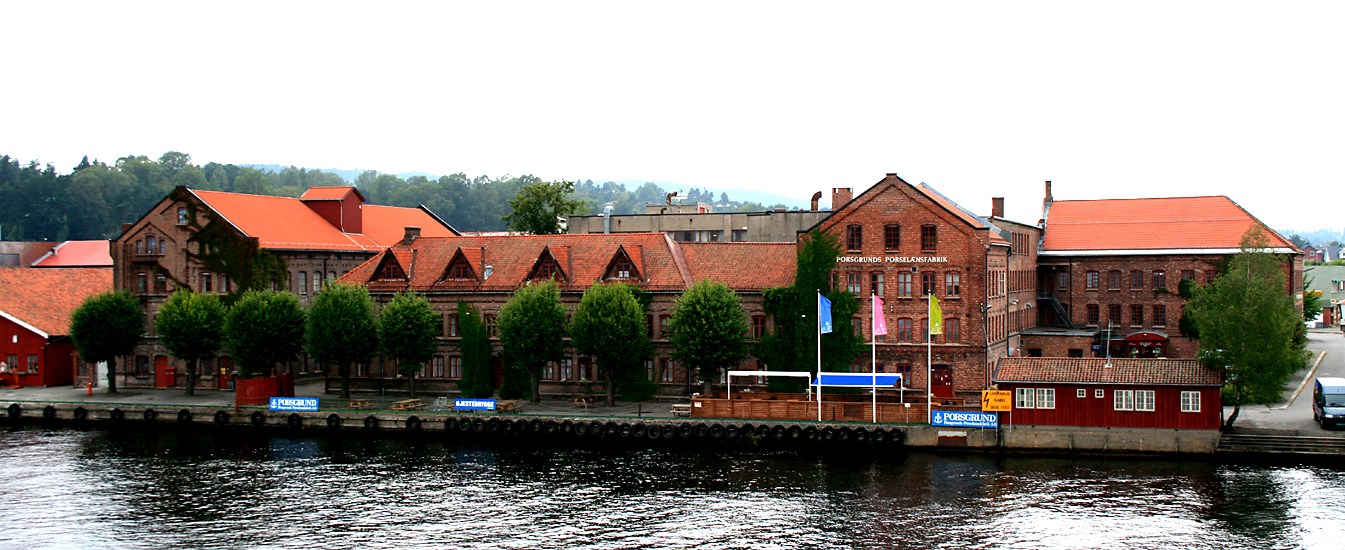
Porsgrunds Porselænsfabrik building

Porsgrund Porcelain Factory (Porsgrunds Porselænsfabrik, abbreviated PP) is a porcelain flatware company located at Porsgrunn in Telemark county, Norway.

== History ==
The company's production plant is a popular tourist attraction. The company was founded by Johan Jeremiassen in 1885 and has produced designs by Norwegian artists such as Ferdinand Finne, Theodor Kittelsen, Frans Widerberg and Odd Nerdrum.

Since 1996 the factory has been owned by the Atle Brynestad company CG Holding AS. In contrast to its prosperous history, Porsgrund has since experienced a financial decline. After years of uncertain future, adjustments have been made to increase cost efficiency, by considerable restructuring to the production and sales processes. Brynestad has restructured his group several times, and CG Holding has gradually become the privately owned group company 3 Norske, which was founded on 2 July 2007. It also includes the sister companies Hadeland Lys and Tinnstøperi (established in 1991) and the cruise ship company SeaDream Yacht Club (established in 2001).

== Gallery ==
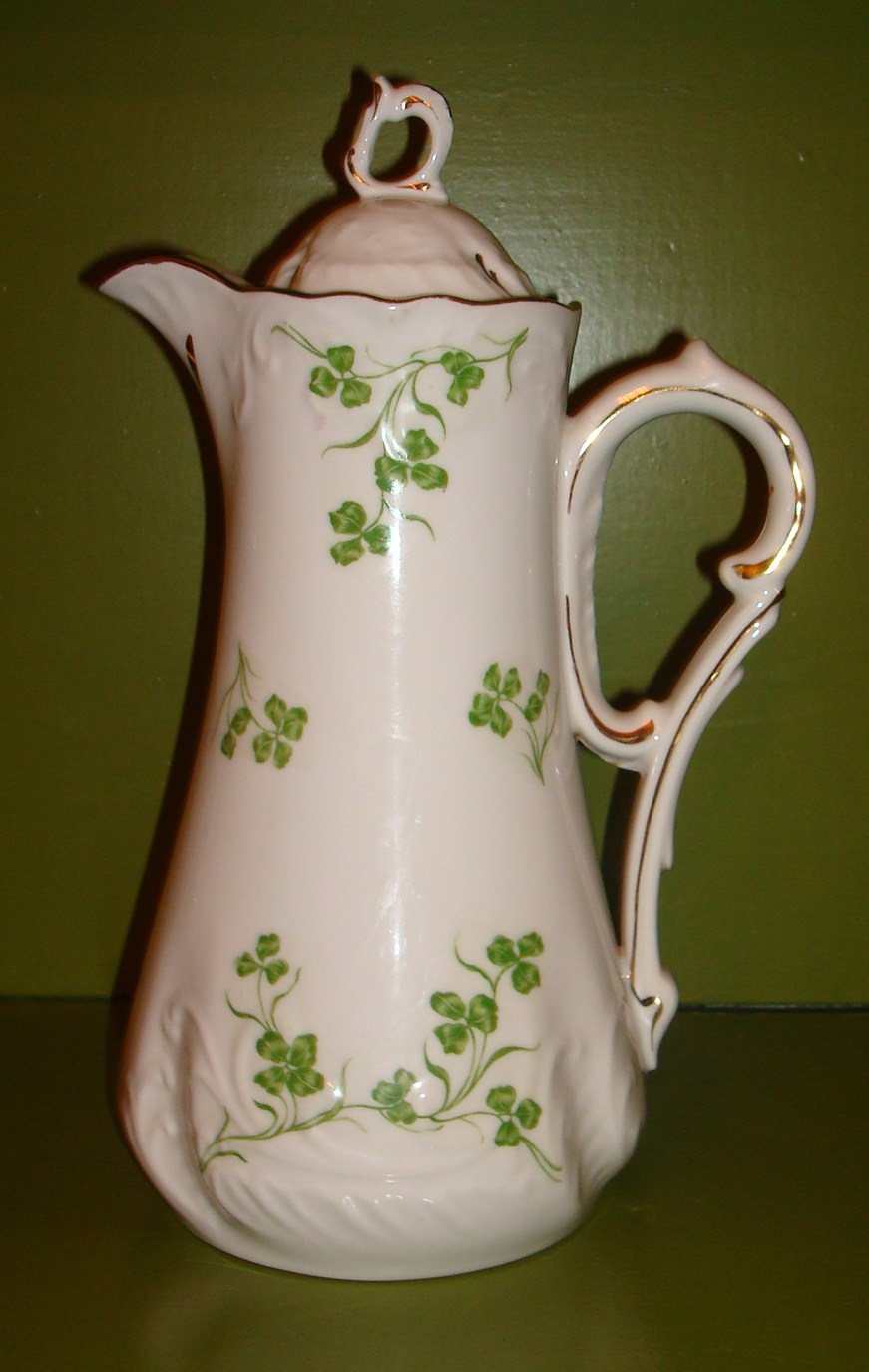
Chocolate pot

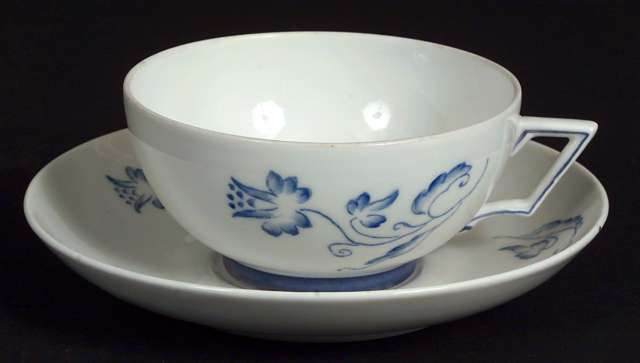
Teacup

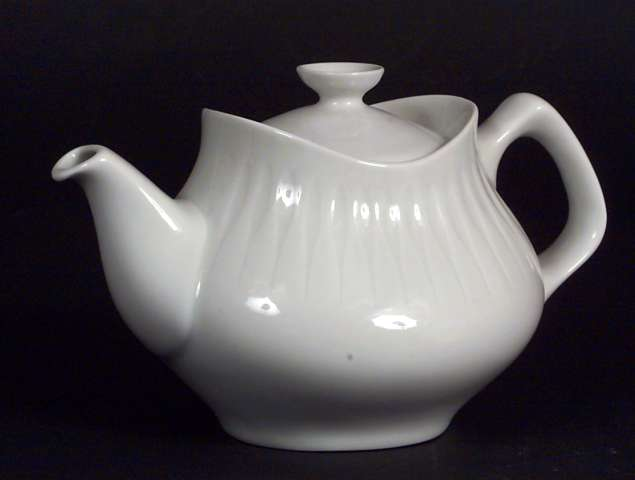
Teapot designed by Konrad Galaaen

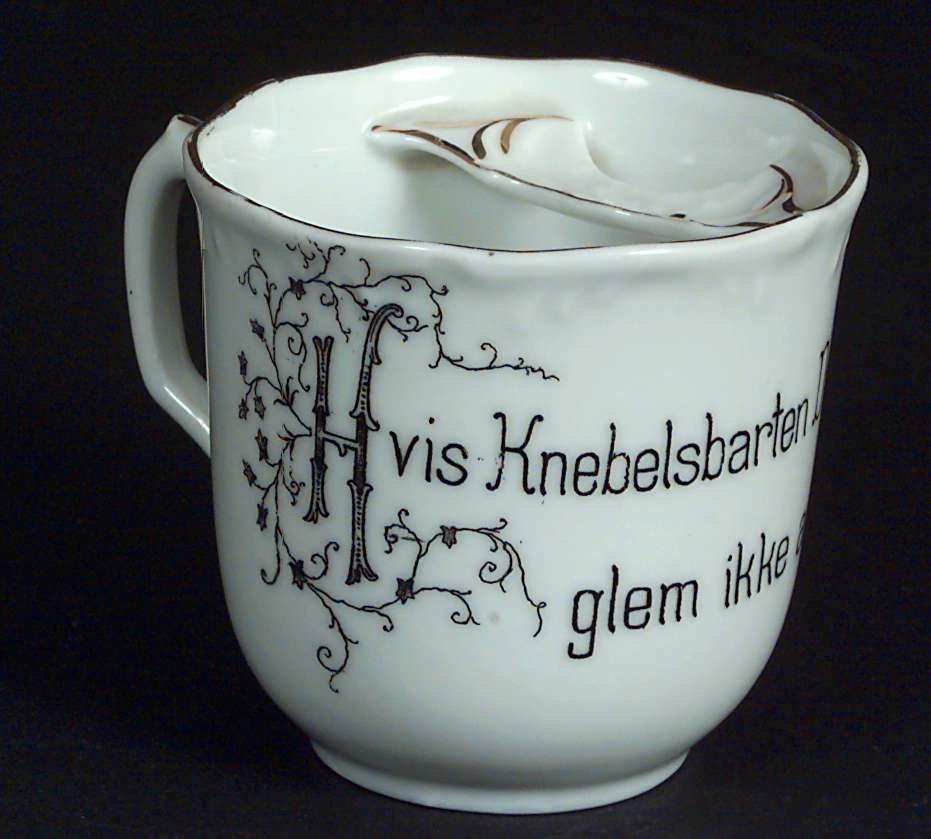
Moustache cup

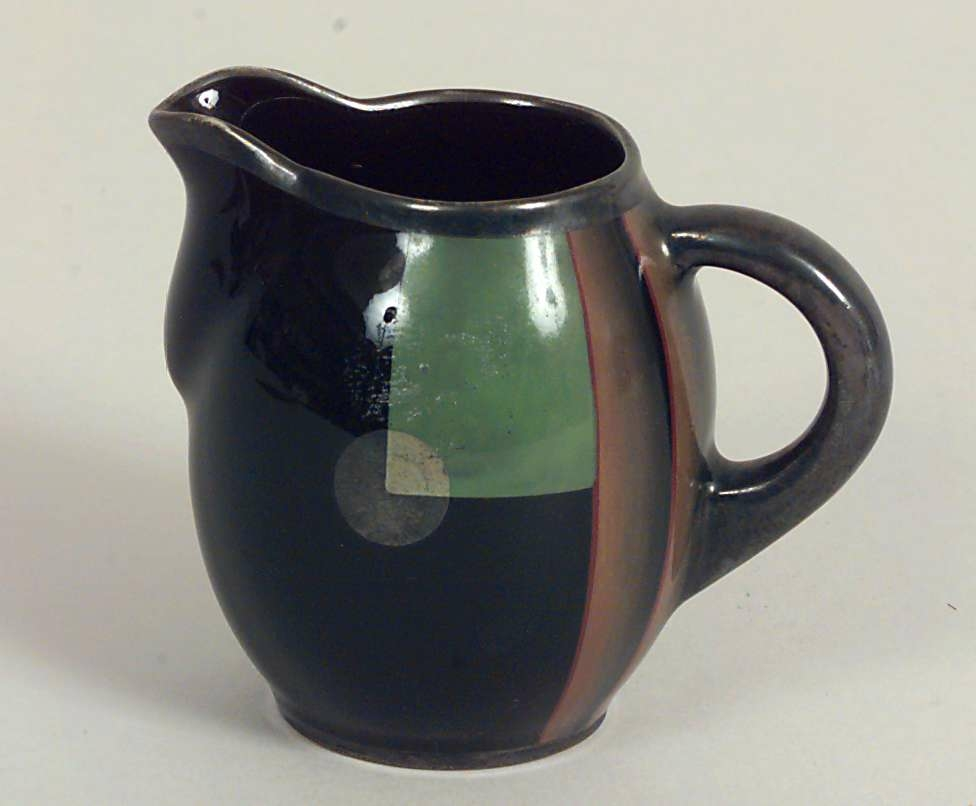
Cream mug designed by Nora Guldbrandsen

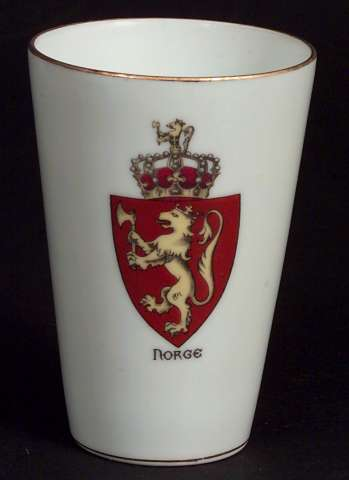
Porcelain glass with national emblem

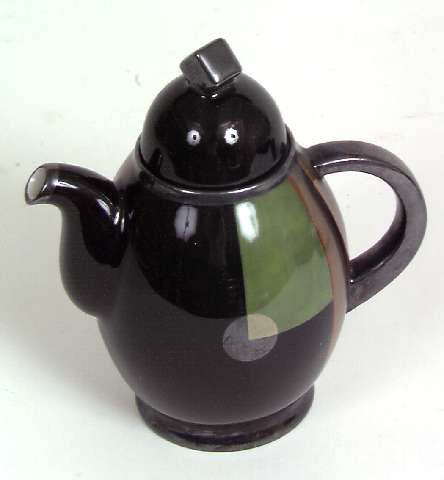
Coffee pot designed by Nora Gulbrandsen

== Other sources ==
- Bøe, Alf (1967) Porsgrunds porselænsfabrik : bedrift og produksjon gjennom åtti år, 1885-1965 (Oslo: Porsgrunds Porselænsfabrik)
- Polak, Ada (2000) Gammelt porsgrund porselen (Oslo: C. Huitfeldt Forlag ) ISBN 82-7003-024-4
