= Master Builder =

A master builder or master mason was the central figure leading construction projects in pre-modern times, thus, a precursor to the modern architect and engineer.

Master Builder(s) may also refer to:

- The Master Builder, an 1892 play by Henrik Ibsen
- A Master Builder, a 2013 film directed by Jonathan Demme
- "Master Builder", a song on Gong's 1974 album You
- Master Builders, characters who build without instructions in The Lego Movie
- Robert Moses, 20th Century urban planner based in New York City, often referred to as “master builder”
