= Johan Jeremiassen =

Norwegian businessman and politician

Johan Jeremiassen (8 January 1843- 25 January 1889) was a Norwegian entrepreneur, ship-owner, consul and politician. He established the porcelain flatware company. Porsgrund Porselænsfabrik.

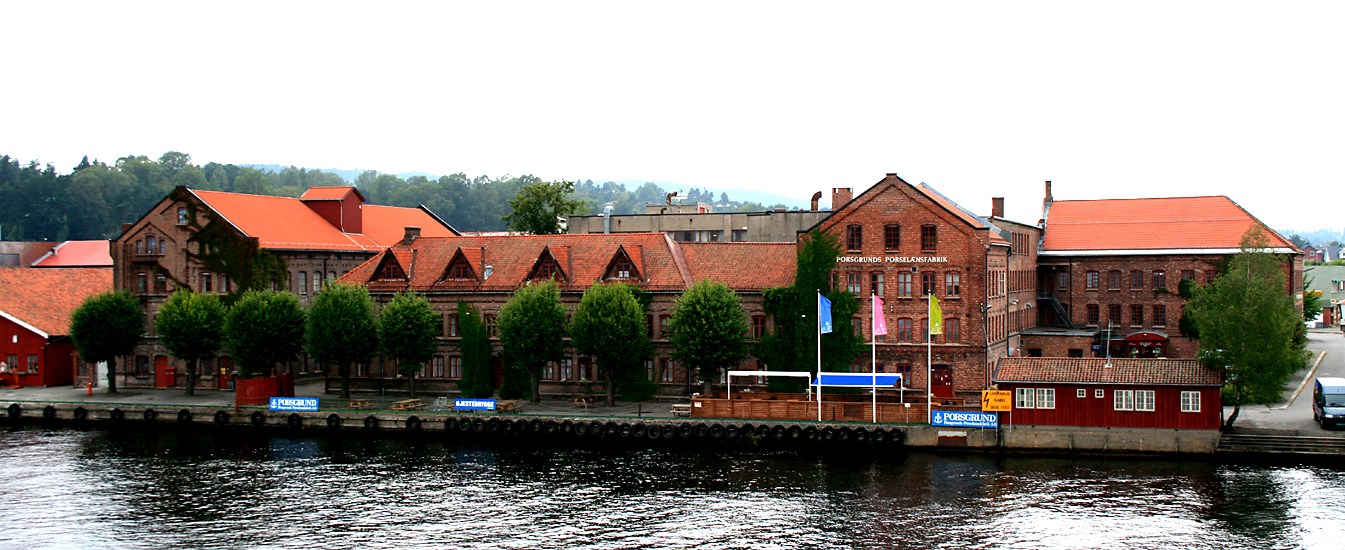
Porsgrunds Porselænsfabrik in Telemark

== Personal life ==
Johan Jeremiassen was born at Kviteseid Municipality in Telemark. He was the son of Knut Johan Jeremiassen and Ingeborg Ellse, née Helseth. His father was the manager of Kviteseid Seminar which was in operation from 1819 until 1889. The family moved to Drammen around 1855.

Johan moved to Kristiania (now Oslo) in the 1860s, where he made a career in manufacturing, and later moved with his wife to her hometown of Porsgrund in 1872 where he became involved in shipping. His brother Herman Jeremiassen moved with him and became a businessperson, as well as mayor.

In 1870 Johan Jeremiassen married Ellen Serine Knudsen (1846–1937), the daughter of ship-owner Christen Knudsen (1813-1888). She was the sister of Jørgen Christian Knudsen and Gunnar Knudsen who operated the shipping company, J.C. og G. Knudsen.

Serine Jeremiassen was elected as one of the first women to serve in Porsgrund municipal council, representing a temperance group Afholdsvennenes Liste, in 1907.

== Career ==
Jeremiassen was a notable and successful ship-owner. Jeremiassen also was vice mayor of Porsgrunn Municipality from 1885 to 1888. He additional served as the German consul for Skiensfjorden.In 1885 he took the initiative to establishing Porsgrund Porselænsfabrik. He died four years later during 1889 at 46 years of age.

== Related reading ==
- Ada Buch Polak (1980) Gammelt Porsgrund Porselen (C. Huitfeldt Forlag AS) ISBN 9788270030248
