= Jørgen Christian Knudsen =

Norwegian politician (1843–1922)

Jørgen Christian Knudsen (5 January or 5 December 1843 – 25 December 1922) was a Norwegian ship-owner and politician for the Conservative Party.

== Personal life ==
He was born at Saltrød in Østre Moland Municipality (now part of Arendal Municipality) as a son of Christen and Guro Knudsen, née Aadnesdatter. The family bought the farm Frednes in Eidanger Municipality in 1854, and moved there. Jørgen Christian Knudsen had one sister Elen Serine, who married Johan Jeremiassen, and one brother Gunnar. Gunnar Knudsen would later become Prime Minister of Norway for the Liberal Party.

In 1867 Jørgen Christian Knudsen married Marie Henriette Resch, daughter of Captain Hagbarth Resch. They settled at Frednes farm. In 1868 they had the son Finn Christian Knudsen, and in 1873 the son Christen Knudsen. A daughter married Robert Rafn. Their daughter Gunda married the British diplomat Christopher Lintrup Paus.

== Career ==
Knudsen was a notable ship-owner, running the company J. C. & G. Knudsen with his brother Gunnar. He was also a shipbuilder and factory owner. The partnership with his brother ended in 1889, and Knudsen ran his own company. The company was passed down to his sons Finn and Christen, and split between them in 1923. One of Knudsen's best known ships was the Skomvær, which was for a time the largest sailing ship in Norway.

He was the mayor of Porsgrund Municipality in 1893, and vice-mayor in 1891, 1892, 1894, and 1895. He was elected to the city council for the first time in 1877. He also represented the city in the Parliament of Norway, where he advocated and defended the union with Sweden. He was elected from the constituency Porsgrund in 1880, 1883, 1886, 1892, 1895, 1898 and 1904. For the first five terms he was a member of the Standing Committee on Justice, then the Standing Committee on the Army. In his last term he chaired the Standing Committee on Railways.

He was a deputy member of the Norwegian Nobel Committee from the beginning in 1897, to 1909. He was also a supervisory council member of the Bank of Norway.
