= Langesund Church =

Church in Telemark, Norway

- Langesund kirke
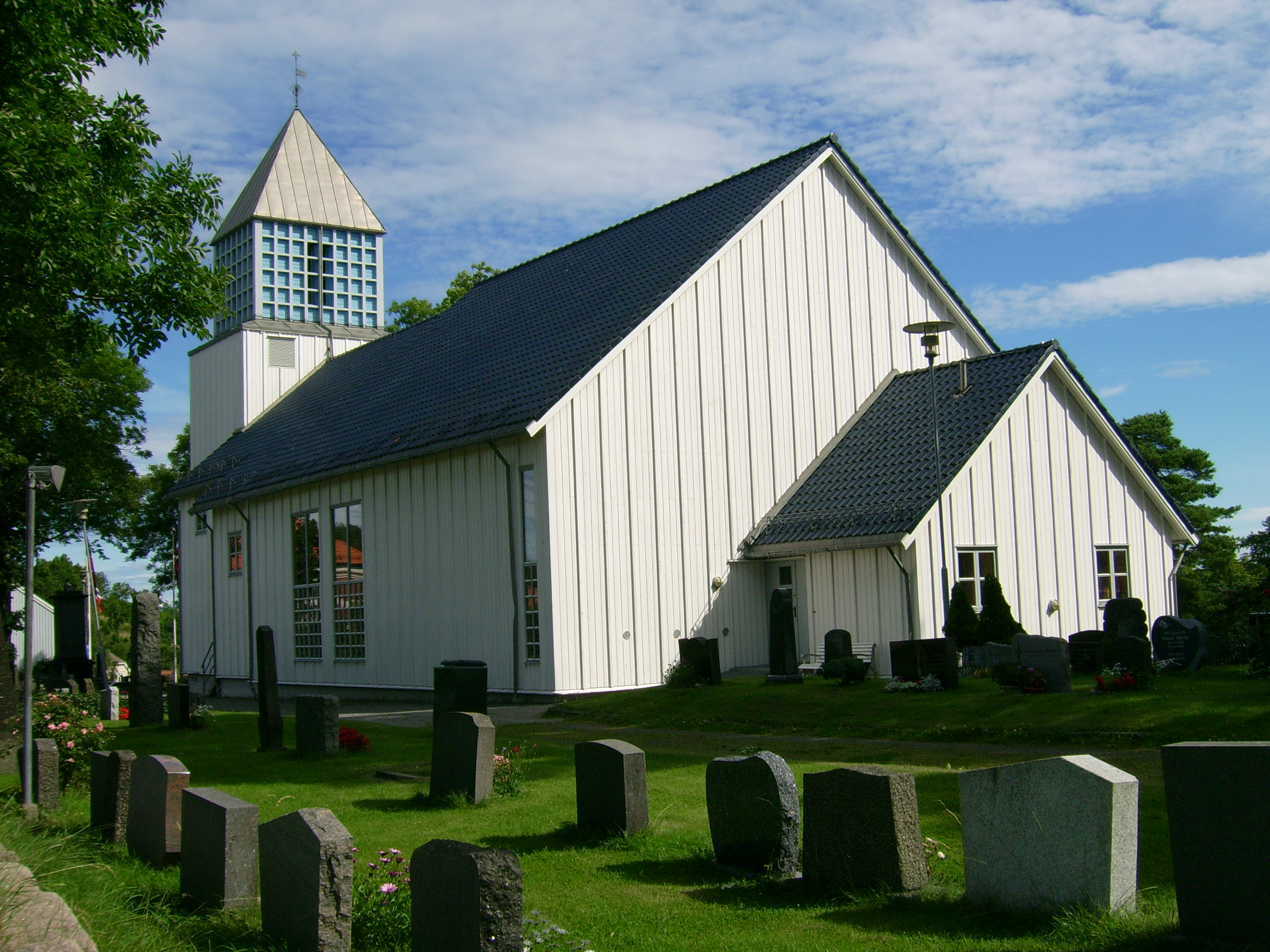
- View of the church
- Langesund Church
- 59°00′03″N 9°44′46″E
- Location: Bamble Municipality, Telemark
- Country: Norway
- Denomination: Church of Norway
- Churchmanship: Evangelical Lutheran

History
- Status: Parish church
- Founded: 1755
- Consecrated: 29 November 1992

Architecture
- Functional status: Active
- Architect(s): Tor Arild Danielsen and Tormod Bynke
- Architectural type: Rectangular
- Completed: 1992 (34 years ago)

Specifications
- Capacity: 340
- Materials: Brick

Administration
- Diocese: Agder og Telemark
- Deanery: Bamble prosti
- Parish: Langesund
- Norwegian Cultural Heritage Site
- Type: Church
- Status: Not protected
- ID: 84899

Langesund Church (Norwegian: Langesund kirke) is a parish church of the Church of Norway in Bamble Municipality in Telemark county, Norway. It is located in the town of Langesund. It is the church for the Langesund parish which is part of the Bamble prosti (deanery) in the Diocese of Agder og Telemark. The white, brick church was built in a rectangular design in 1992 using plans drawn up by the architect Tor Arild Danielsen. The church seats about 340 people.

== History ==
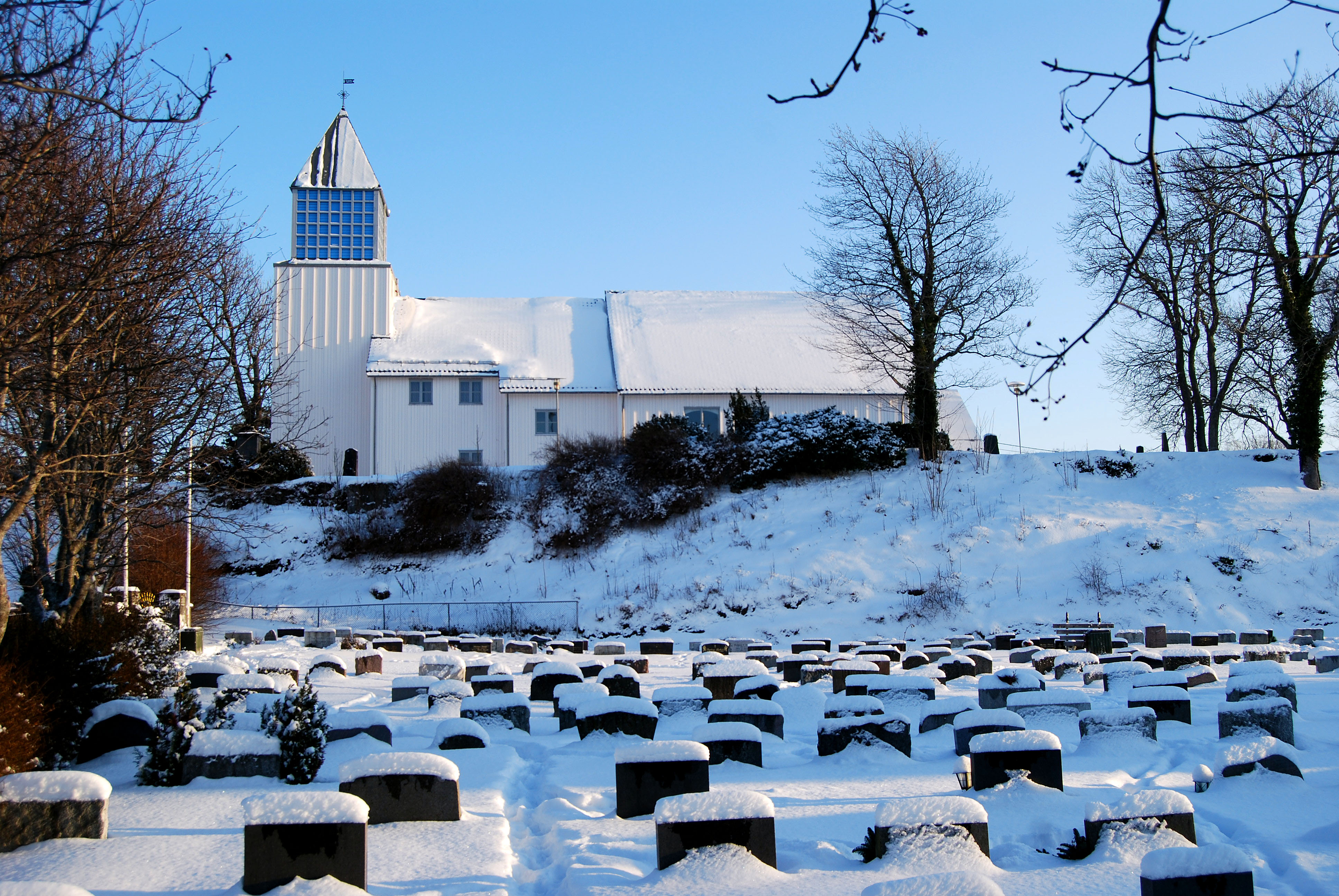
View of the church

From 1753 to 1755, a church was built in Langesund. It was consecrated on 22 July 1755 Bishop Niels Dorph. The church went by the name Bethel and it had about 450 seats. This was a timber long church that had a tower with a church porch at the foot of the tower. Later, a sacristy was added. On 27 November 1988, there was a fire and the church burned down during the night (possibly caused by a furnace located behind the altar, near the sacristy. Very little from the old church was able to be saved.

After the fire, there was considerable local disagreement about the design of the new church, so a compromise was reached. The new church was designed by Tormod Bynke and Tor Arild Danielsen. The foundation stone was laid on 28 June 1991 by Princess Märtha Louise in the presence of King Harald, Queen Sonja, and Crown Prince Haakon. The church was built in 1991–1992 and it was consecrated on 29 November 1992, four years after the fire. The new building is of brick, but clad in wood. The church has a tower at the entrance on the north side and a sacristy on the south end. The main body of the church has a church hall, a nave, and a chancel, with a movable dividing wall between the church hall and nave. The external form is similar to that of a traditional long church, but it also has uses more modern materials and architectural details.

== See also ==
- List of churches in Agder og Telemark
