= Vestre Porsgrunn Church =

Church in Telemark, Norway

- Vestre Porsgrunn kirke / Immanuelkirken
- Vestsidens kirke
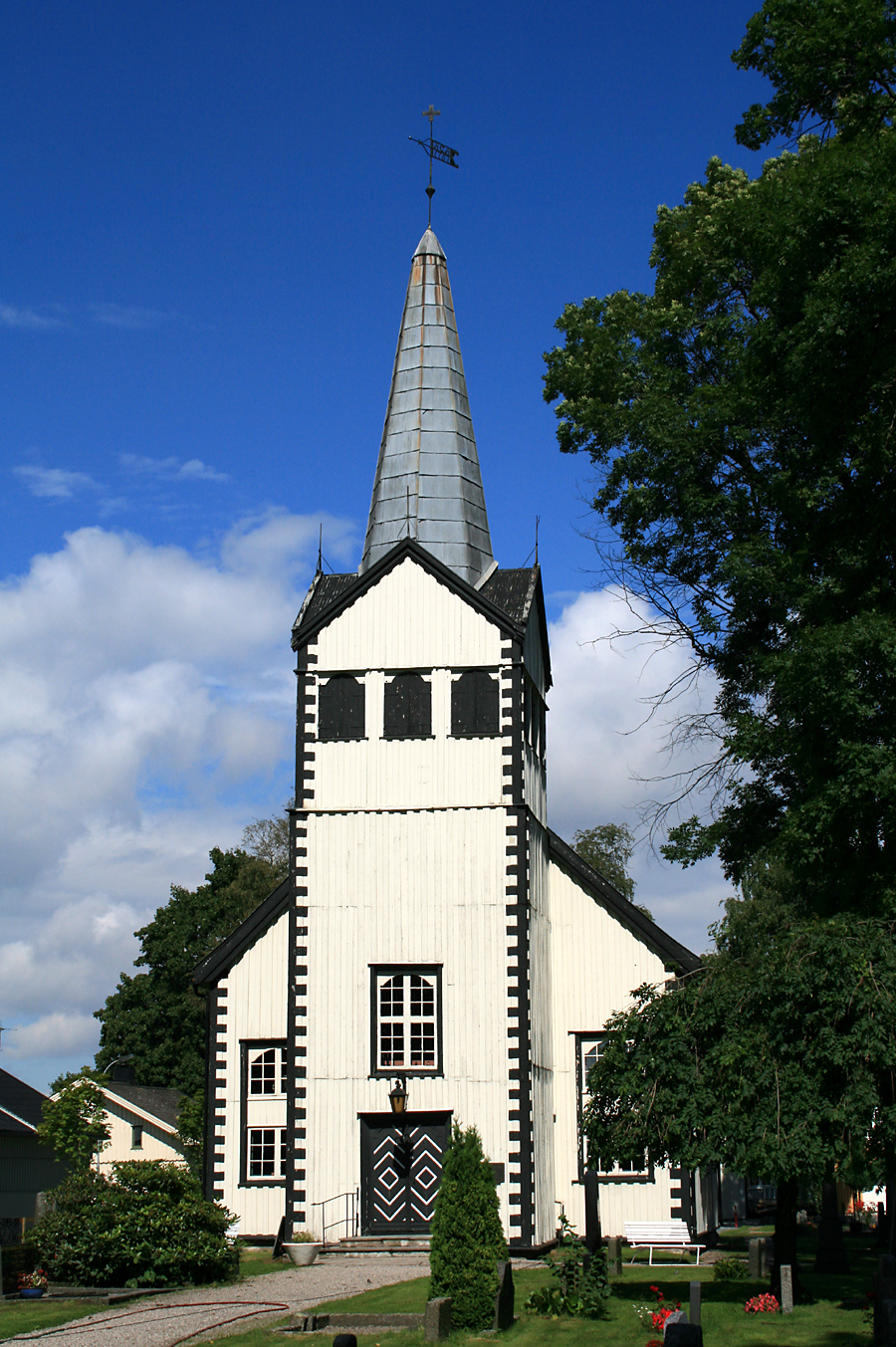
- View of the church
- Vestre Porsgrunn Church
- 59°08′34″N 9°38′30″E
- Location: Porsgrunn Municipality, Telemark
- Country: Norway
- Denomination: Church of Norway
- Churchmanship: Evangelical Lutheran

History
- Status: Parish church
- Founded: 1758
- Consecrated: 16 March 1758

Architecture
- Functional status: Active
- Architect(s): Lauritz de Thurah and Andreas Pfützner
- Architectural type: Long church
- Completed: 1758 (268 years ago)

Specifications
- Capacity: 170
- Materials: Wood

Administration
- Diocese: Agder og Telemark
- Deanery: Skien prosti
- Parish: Porsgrunn
- Norwegian Cultural Heritage Site
- Type: Church
- Status: Automatically protected
- ID: 85820

Vestre Porsgrunn Church (Norwegian: Vestre Porsgrunn kirke) is a parish church of the Church of Norway in Porsgrunn Municipality in Telemark county, Norway. It is located in the town of Porsgrunn. It is one of the churches for the Porsgrunn parish which is part of the Skien prosti (deanery) in the Diocese of Agder og Telemark. The white, wooden church was built in a long church design in 1758 using plans drawn up by the architects Lauritz de Thurah and Andreas Pfützner. The church seats about 170 people.

== History ==
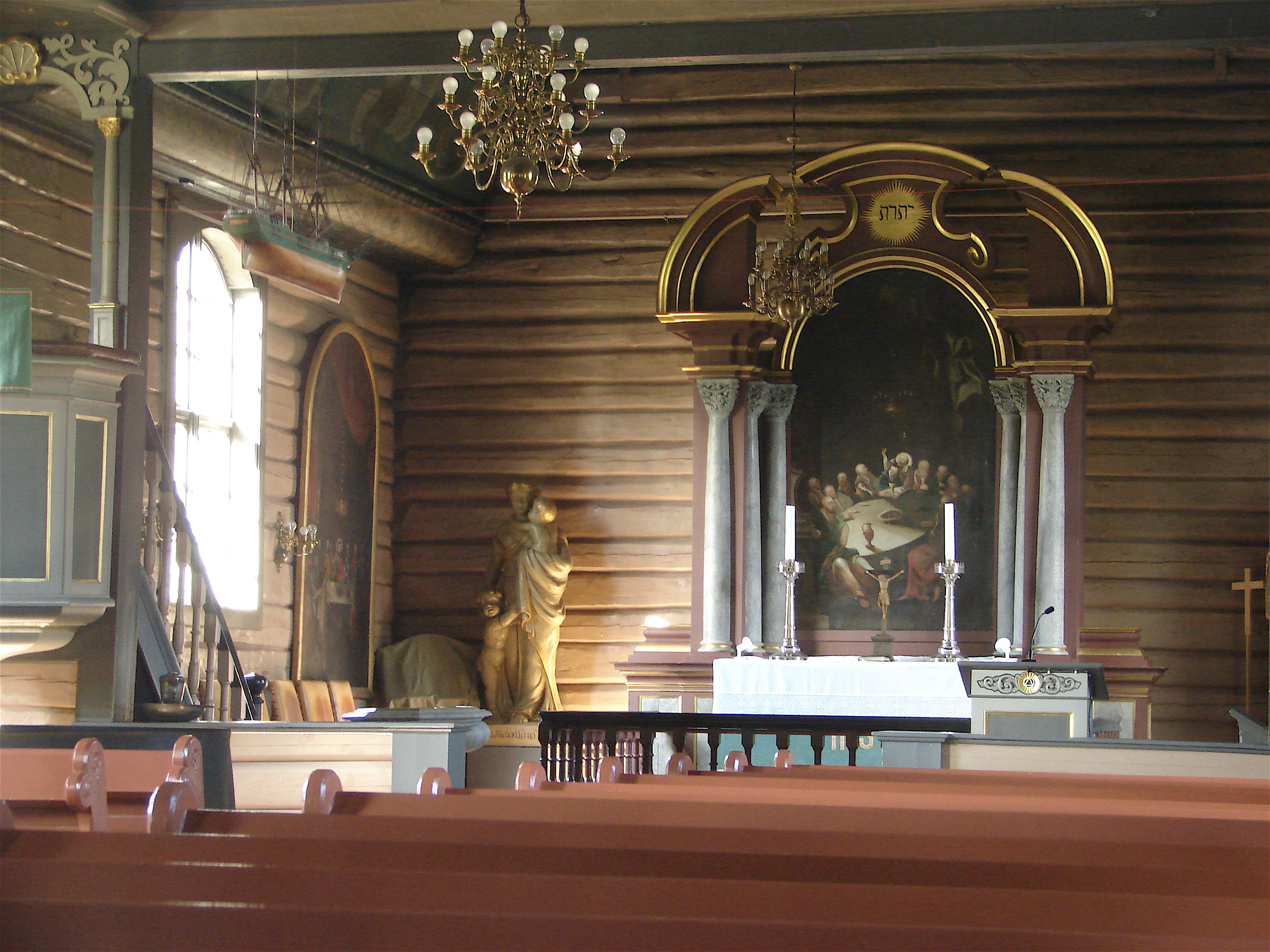
Interior of the church

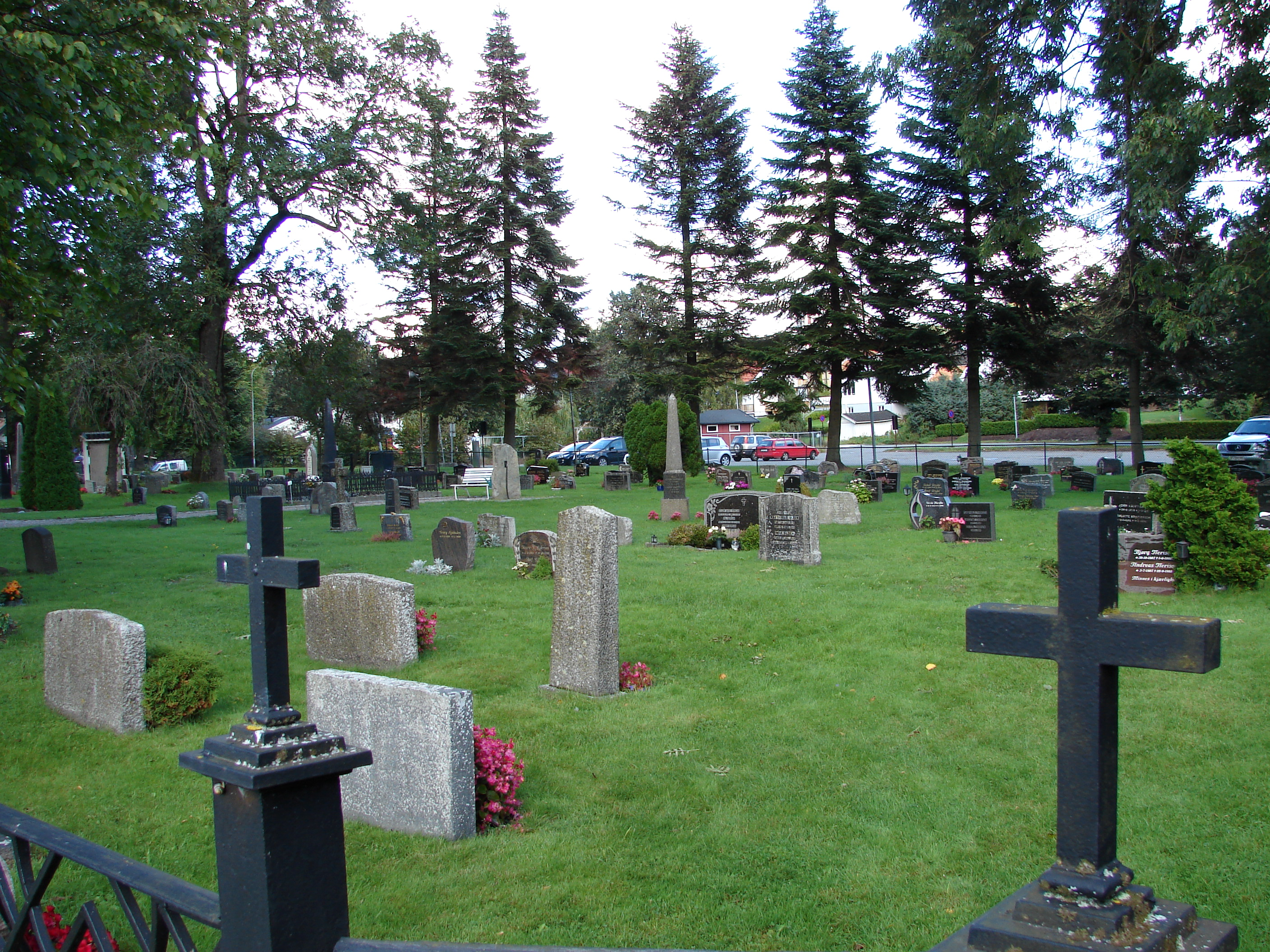
Graveyard surrounding the church

Porsgrunn grew up as a ladested for the nearby town of Skien. In 1690, a cemetery was built in Porsgrunn, on the west side of the river. A small wooden building at the cemetery was sometimes used for worship services due to the lack of a church in Porsgrunn. In 1722, a new cemetery chapel was built to replace the previous one. These buildings are sometimes considered the precursors to the current church. The King gave authorization to construct the church in the autumn of 1756. Joen Jacobsen was hired to build the church using plans by the architects Lauritz de Thurah and Andreas Pfützner. Construction took place in 1757–1758. The church was a wooden long church with a bell tower at the entrance to the south, and a rectangular choir to the north of the nave. The year on the wind vane in the spire is 1757, presumably the year when the tower was completed. The new building was consecrated on 16 March 1758 and the church was called "Immanuel Church" (Norwegian: Immanuelkirken).

In 1766, the log construction was covered over with wooden paneling that were painted white and a black trim pattern on the corners give the illusion of masonry. In 1777, there was a major renovation of the interior where some of the partition between the nave and choir was removed and the choir ceiling was redone as a barrel vault, which was painted with the sky and clouds. In 1830, a sacristy was built to the north of the choir. Around 1900, the interior was changed according to the taste of the time: the vaulted ceiling was painted white and the paneled walls were painted green, the altarpiece was replaced with a cross, and much of the old furniture was replaced. In the 1930s, the interior was somewhat restored under the direction of Wilhelm Swensen. During this project, the wall paneling was removed and the historic rococo interior was brought back.

== See also ==
- List of churches in Agder og Telemark
