= Christen Knudsen =

Norwegian ship-owner

Christen Knudsen (25 January 1813 - 7 April 1888) was a Norwegian ship-owner.

== Personal life ==
Christen Knudsen was born in 1813 at Salterød near Arendal. He moved to Porsgrunn in 1855.

He married Guro Aadnesdatter (1808-1900), later spelt "Gurine Aanonsen". The couple had three children. Their sons Jørgen Christian Knudsen and Gunnar Knudsen both became wealthy ship-owners and influential politicians: Jørgen Christian as mayor and parliament member, Gunnar as Prime Minister of Norway. Their only daughter Serine married Johan Jeremiassen and had a political career of her own, starting even before women's suffrage was introduced.

== Career ==
Having moved to Porsgrunn, the ship business flourished. As a ship-owner he owned a considerable fleet, of which fourteen ships was built at his own shipbuilding yard. Together with P. M. Petersen and son-in-law Johan Jeremiassen he was described as one of "the three large ship-owners of the city". He was also a navy captain. On the mainland, he invested in real estate.

A ship belonging to his son Gunnar was named Christen Knudsen, but this was sunk by the Kaiserliche Marine in 1916.
