= Brevik Line =

Railway line in Norway

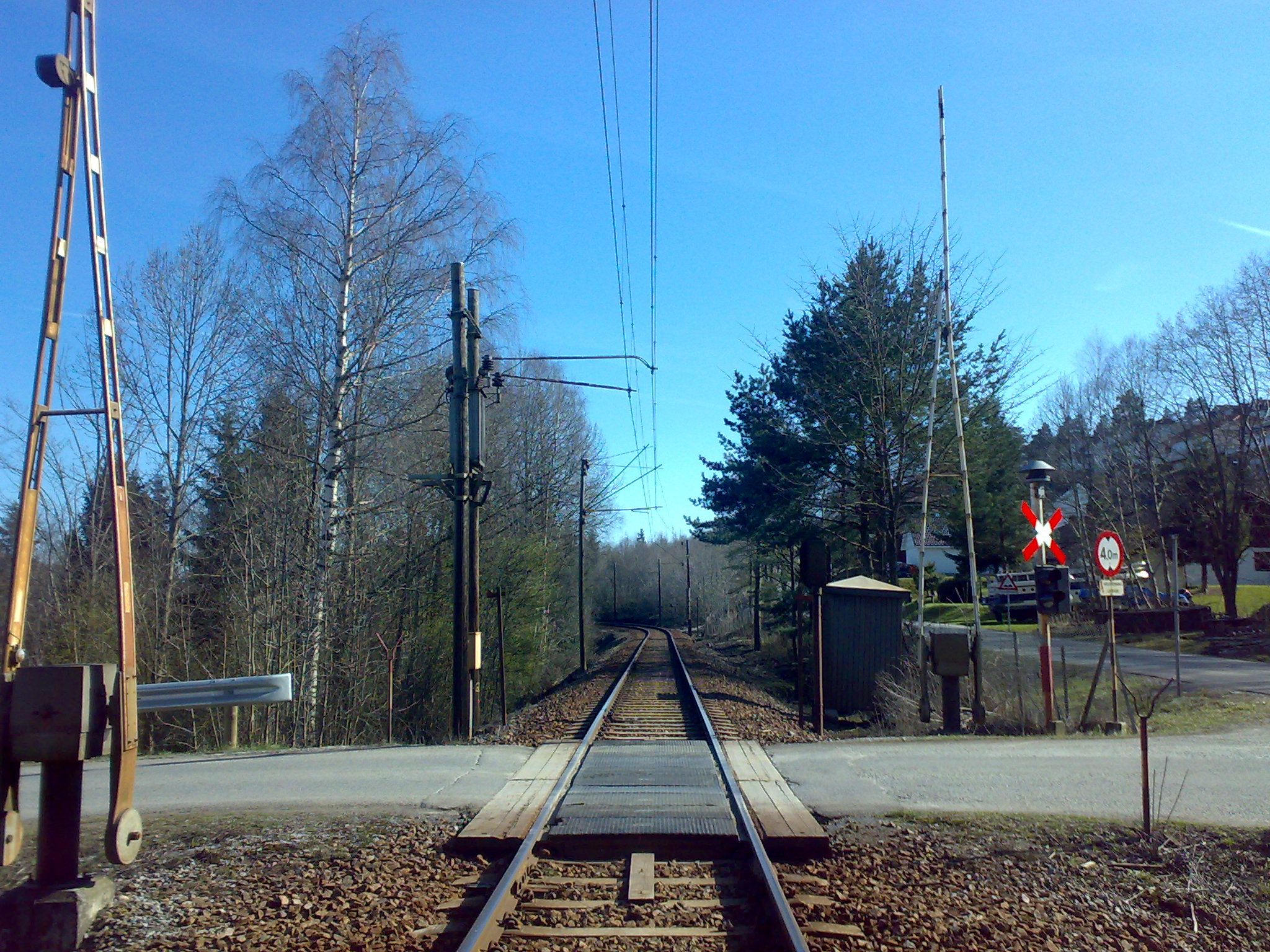

Overview
- Owner: Norwegian National Rail Administration
- Termini: Eidanger; Brevik
- Stations: 0

Service
- Type: Railway
- Operator: CargoNet
- Rolling stock: El 14

History
- Opened: 15 October 1895

Technical
- Line length: 10 km (6.2 mi)
- Number of tracks: Single
- Track gauge: 1,435 mm (4 ft 8 1/2 in)
- Electrification: 15 kV 16.7 Hz AC

The Brevik Line (Norwegian: Brevikbanen) is a 10-kilometer (6.2 mi) railway which runs from Eidanger to Brevik in Porsgrunn Municipality, Norway. The single track and electrified branch line of the Vestfold Line is exclusively used for freight traffic to Norcem Brevik hauled by CargoNet.

First proposed in 1875, the Norwegian State Railways (NSB) started construction in 1892, allowing the railway to be officially opened on 15 October 1895. An early important service was correspondence with a train from Oslo to a coastal ferry, as it was the closest line to Agder until 1927. The Brevik Line was originally built as a narrow gauge railway, but was converted to standard gauge in 1921 and electrified in 1949. From the opening until 1964 the line saw between ten and nineteen daily round trips with a commuter train to Skien. All passenger transport was terminated in 1968.

== Route ==
The Brevik Line branches from the Vestfold Line at Eidanger Station and runs for 10.02 kilometers (6.23 mi) to Brevik Station, making it located entirely within Porsgrunn. The railway is single track, standard gauge and electrified at 15 kV 16.7 Hz AC, but lacks centralized traffic control, automatic train control, and GSM-R. Excluding spurs, the line has eighteen bridges and eleven level crossings. It reaches a maximum elevation of 50.55 meters (165.8 ft) above mean sea level and a minimum of 7.75 meters (25.4 ft). The line is owned and maintained by the Norwegian National Rail Administration. The only regular traffic on the line is the hauling of limestone for Norcem Brevik. Operated by CargoNet, the trains run 9 kilometers (5.6 mi) to the limestone mine in Porsgrunn.

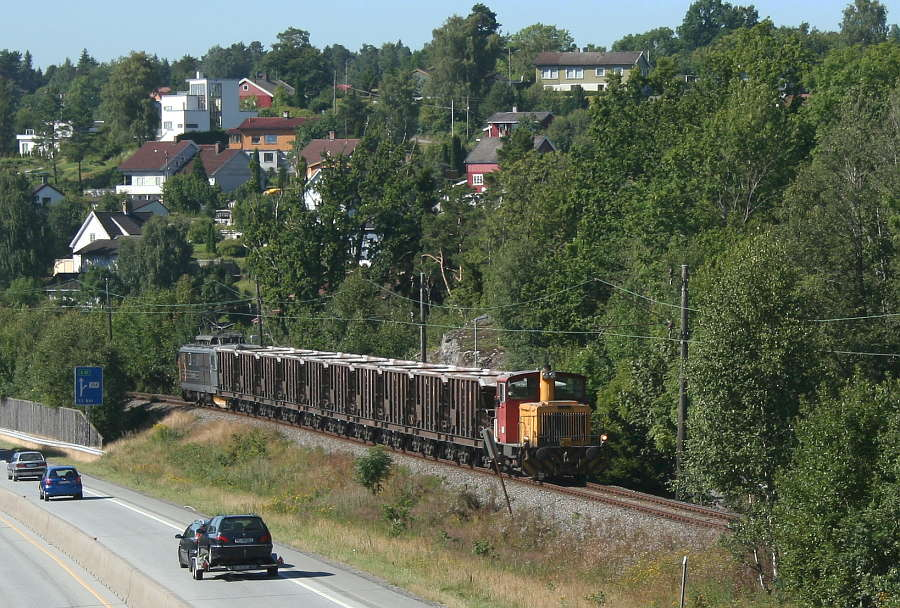
A train hauling limestone to Norcem Brevik

The Brevik Line branches from the Vestfold Line at the now disused Eidanger Station, which is located 192.60 kilometers (119.68 mi) from Oslo. The Brevik Line is connected to Eidanger Station from the east side, so trains running to Porsgrunn and Skien can run through, while trains continuing on the Vestfold Line must switch direction. The line passes a halt at Prestealléen (2.23 km or 1.39 mi from Eidanger) before reaching Nystrand Station (2.75 kilometers or 1.71 miles). The station served a popular recreational area and generated a lot of the holiday and weekend traffic on the line. After passing a halt at Mule (3.70 kilometers or 2.30 miles) the line reaches Skjelsvik Station (4.61 kilometers or 2.86 miles). Southwards the line runs a relatively straight section, passing a halt at Valen (5.50 kilometers or 3.42 miles) before reaching Heistad Station (7.05 kilometers or 4.38 miles). There was a spur to Heistad Fabrikker.

South of Heistad the line branches, with a spur running to the Grenland Terminal. This section includes a 350-meter (1,150 ft) tunnel. The main line continues past a halt at Ørvik (8.24 kilometers or 5.12 miles) before reaching Norcem Brevik. South of this point the railway has been demolished. There was a 200-meter (660 ft) spur to the factory. The line formerly continued past Dalen Station (9.00 kilometers or 5.59 miles) through the 21-meter (69 ft) Trosvik Tunnel before terminating at Brevik Station (10.02 kilometers or 6.23 miles). In Brevik there was a 630-meter (2,070 ft) spur which ran down to the port.

== History ==
=== Planning ===
The first public meeting for planning a railway in the Grenland region was conducted on 19 January 1874. At a second meeting on 28 January a planning committee was appointed, with representatives from the various municipalities in the area. It proposed three alternative routes for a railway: a continuation of the proposed Vestfold Line from Larvik, a railway down the valley of Lågendalen from Kongsberg, or a link from the Kongsberg–Drammen Line via Siljan to Skien. The Vestfold alternative was the cheapest and was thus preferred. The committee's proposals called for a branch from the Vestfold Line to Brevik, although it would run from Porsgrunn via Roligheten and Kleveland.

The branch was estimated to cost 226,000 Norwegian speciedaler. Two thirds would be financed by the state and the remaining 70,000 speciedaler would have to be financed through local purchase of shares in the railway company. Brevik Municipality bought half the shares, but it was not possible to fill up the quota with private sales. When Parliament voted over the construction of the Vestfold Line in 1875, the branch to Brevik was dismissed.

Discussion of a branch to Brevik resumed in 1887, when parliamentarian Livius Smitt proposed for Parliament a line from Eidanger to Brevik on behalf of the municipal council. It was considered by the legislature in 1888, but only 39 parliamentarians supported it, compared to the 68 who voted the proposal down. Thus the following year detailed planning commenced to better the political support for a line. Funding for the Brevik Line was dismissed by Parliament again in 1890, but the following year, on 4 July 1890, a majority voted in favor of the line. The condition was that 30,000 Norwegian krone (NOK) be funded locally.

Most of the railway would be located in the former Eidanger Municipality. Eidanger Municipal Council was not particularly interested in the railway, and was not willing to pay for expropriation in their own municipality. Thus Brevik Municipality was forced to pay for all expropriation along the line and limited their support for the entire project to NOK 16,000. Brevik Municipal Council passed the plans and their financing on 31 March 1893. However, there was not community consensus as to the location of Brevik Station, with large camps each preferring Strømtangen and Setretangen. The municipal council voted in favor of Strømtangen on 25 June.

=== Construction ===
Built by the Norwegian State Railways, construction commenced in 1892 and was initially estimated to take one year. However, it took three years, largely because of inferior geological conditions, in part caused by clay in the ground. Construction did fall within the NOK 750,000 budget. Of this, Brevik Municipality ended up paying NOK 90,000, which would stand as a major burden for them for years. Export of ice for cooling was a major industry in Eidanger from the 1850s to the 1970s. There were several small dammed-up ice lakes, and four of these had to be expropriated to give way for the railway. The construction work was initially led by S. H. Strøm, and from January 1894 by M. Olsen. Surveying started in May 1894 and allowed negotiations for expropriation to commence in the fall, which lasted a half year. Earthwork hauling started in the spring of 1893, first with 100 men and by the summer increasing to 200.

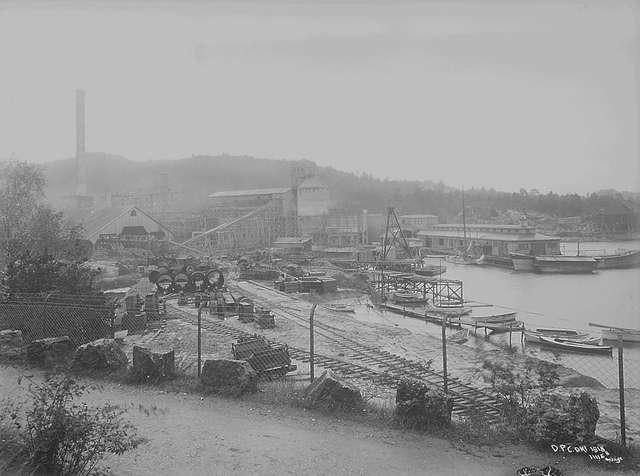
Spurs of the Brevik Line at Dalen Portland Cement in the late 1910s

All wages were paid as piece work. Work was conducted for ten hours, six days a week and paid an average NOK 3.05 per hour. A labor union was established on 28 July 1893. Most of the workers were nomadic navvies which moved to the area for the period they worked on the line, and then moved onwards to a new project. A significant portion of the works were Swedish. Earthwork was dug using spades and picks. Horses were only used for hauling heavy stones. Most of the work was conducted in clay, limestone and Disambiguated: dolomite. The telegraph cables were laid in early 1895. To match Vestfold Line, the railway was built with 3 ft 6 in (1,067 mm) narrow gauge (1,067 mm (3 ft 6 in)). The official opening took place on 15 October 1895, officiated by King Oscar II.

=== Operational history ===
An important function of the line was that it allowed correspondence with the coastal ferry route onwards to Kristiansand, which commenced in 1896 because Brevik at the time was the furthest along the coast the railway had reached. A daily night train with direct service to Oslo was offered, initially with a travel time of six hours and seven minutes. Tickets for the two could be purchased together and the ferry would wait up to an hour for a delayed train. This was supplemented with a direct commuter service to Porsgrunn, initially bringing the number of daily trains to 20. The exact number varied throughout the years, but did not exceed 26 until the 1950s. The arrival of the railway led to growth in Brevik, as it created numerous jobs both in the railway and shipping industry. Although the passenger service first and foremost served commuters into Porsgrunn and Skien, it also saw a large reverse traffic of city-dwellers travel to the Eidangerfjord to recreate. In July and August NSB sold 9,600 tickets to the segment. This further resulted in the growth in summer cabins in the area built by the affluent.

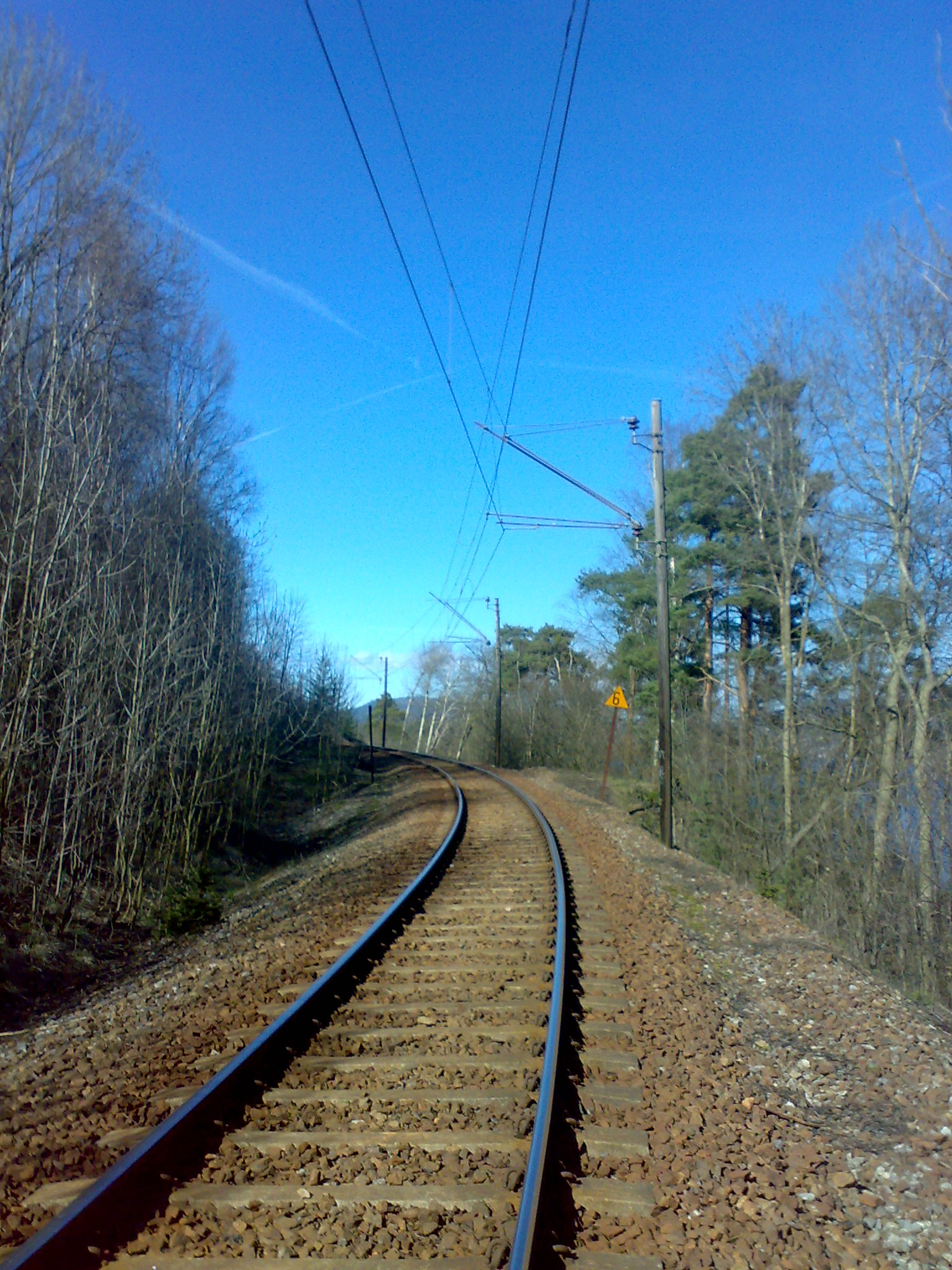
A section of the railway next to the Eidangerfjord

Plans for a railway ferry service to Continental Europe were launched in 1912, when representatives from market towns along the coast from Vestfold to Agder were called to discuss the matter. Council Carl Stousland was the main initiator, and visited various ports in Denmark searching for a suitable site. By 1915 he had settled on Frederikshavn and stated that it would provide the fastest service from Norway to Hamburg, Germany. Two ferries would be required, each using seven hours on a crossing and allowing for two return services per day. However, Stousland never succeeded at realizing the plans.

Plans to drop the night service were articulated in 1903, but discarded. However, the poor timing for passengers from Drammen and Vestfold, in addition to surplus cost of keeping sleeping cars, forced the night service to a halt from 1918. Instead a late evening service was run, terminating at Brevik at 01:25. To secure compatibility with the Bratsberg Line, which had been opened in 1917, the section of track past Grenland to Eidanger and onwards to Brevik was converted to standard gauge in 1921. When it opened on 16 June it succeeded a period of four years where the segment from Eidanger to Skien had dual gauge. From the same year the Oslo service was re-routed via the Bratsberg Line and Kongsvinger to Oslo. A spur to the cement factory at Dalen was built in the early 1920s, but removed again during the late 1940s.

In general the local trains to Skien were hauled using a NSB Class 32 steam locomotives, and the express train by NSB Class 30. With the extension of the Sørlandet Line to Kragerø with the 1927 opening of the Kragerø Line, Brevik was no longer the outermost railway station along the southern coast. Long-haul and postal traffic was lost, and by 1934 the coastal ferry service was terminated. In cooperation with commercial interests, NSB ran a summer service from Kongsberg marketed as the "bathing train" to attract inlanders to the coast. Ridership peaked in 1920, when 362,384 passengers traveled on the line. Initially the freight traffic was minimal, with between three and four thousand tonnes in the early 1920. This was soon boosted and hit 25,000 tonnes in the 1930s. A halt at Ørvik opened on 26 June 1923 and on 27 July 1933 halts were opened at Prestealléen, Mule, Valen and Dalen. A spur to Heistad Fabrikker opened in 1936.

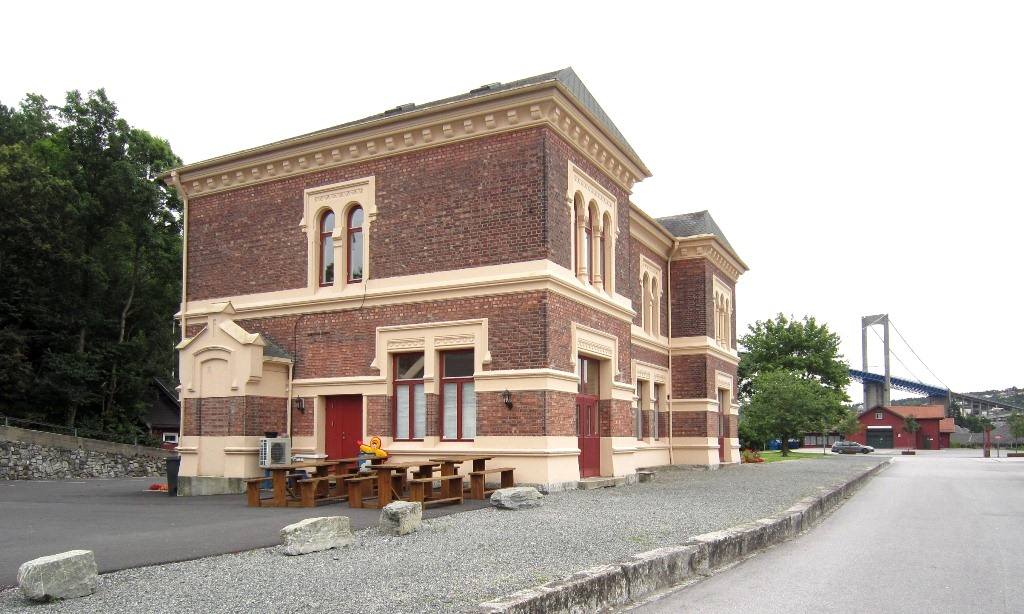
Brevik Station with the Brevik Bridge in the background

The Brevik Line opened with electric traction from 19 June 1949, along with the Bratsberg Line through Grenland. Thus electric trains from Oslo could reach Brevik via that route. The Vestfold Line would not be electrified until the mid-1950s. With the electrification the line saw a major increase in traffic—by 1951 there were eighteen round trips and nineteen from 1957, operating at a fixed, hourly headway. Following the 1962 opening of the Brevik Bridge the railway saw a sharp decline in patronage as the bus service was rerouted, capturing more of the traffic. Thus NSB decided to terminate the commuter trains to Skien from 1 February 1964. The express trains followed suit and since 26 May 1968 there has only been freight trains on the line.

A spur line to Isola Fabrikker opened on 1966 and a new spur line to the cement factory opened on 30 September 1974, replacing an aerial tramway. Norcem has since been the main customer for freight trains on the line, with 900,000 tonnes of limestone hauled in 1998. Proposals for reopening the line were launched in 1989, but never materialized. Grenland Harbour upgraded the port terminal at Tangen during the late 1980s and a branch to the Grenland Terminal was opened in 1993, with the port authority hoping that an international ferry service would be started. However, the plans never materialized. Two El 13 locomotives collided at Norcem on 18 September 1998, although neither motorman was seriously injured. CargoNet started a weekly container train service each from Brevik to Oslo and Bergen in 2014, allowing for transit from ship traffic.

== See also ==
- Narrow gauge railways in Norway
