= Eidanger Station =

Former railway station in Porsgrunn, Norway

Eidanger
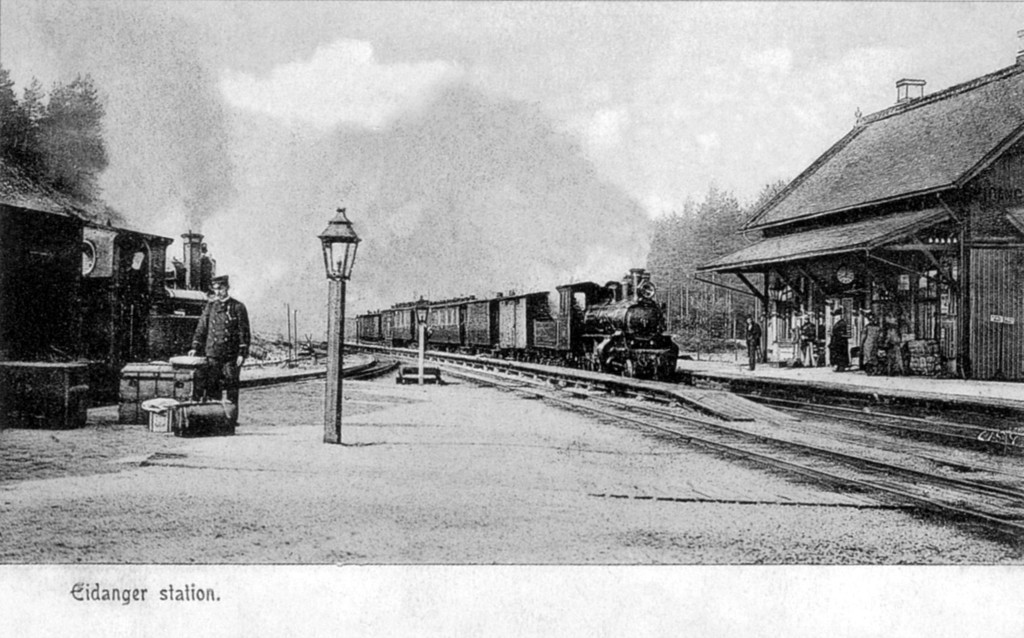
- The station seen on a postcard from 1910.

General information
- Location: Eidanger, Porsgrunn Municipality; Norway
- Coordinates: 59°07′26″N 9°41′45″E
- Elevation: 11.6 m (38 ft)
- System: Railway station
- Owner: Norwegian State Railways
- Lines: Bratsberg Line; Brevik Line; Vestfold Line
- Distance: 192.60 km (119.68 mi)

Construction
- Architect: Balthazar Lange

History
- Opened: 23 November 1882
- Closed: 2 March 1987
Location

Eidanger Station (Norwegian: Eidanger stasjon) is a disused railway station at Eidanger in Porsgrunn Municipality, Norway. Located at the intersection of the Bratsberg Line, Brevik Line and Vestfold Line, it is located 192.60 kilometers (119.68 mi) from Oslo. The station buildings were designed by Balthazar Lange.

The station opened as part of the Vestfold Line on 23 November 1882, with the Brevik Line opening in 1895. From 1916 the Brevik- and Bratsberg Lines received standard gauge, and Eidanger was used for transshipment with the narrow-gauge Vestfold Line. The station's importance diminished with the latter's gauge conversion in 1941. The commuter train service between Brevik and Skien terminated in 1964, reducing most of the station's traffic. It was closed on 2 March 1987, but remains in use as a passing loop.

== History ==
Eidanger Station was built as part of the Vestfold Line, and opened on 23 November 1882 as part of the second segment, between Larvik Station and Skien Station. At this time also the section west of the station was regarded as part of the Vestfold Line, which was built with narrow gauge 3 ft 6 in (1,067 mm). Plans for a branch from Eidanger to Brevik had been articulated during the construction of the Vestfold Line, but were not approved by Parliament until 4 July 1891. The Brevik Line opened on 15 October 1895.

To secure compatibility with the Bratsberg Line, the section of track past Grenland to Eidanger and onwards to Brevik was converted to dual gauge from 4 December 1916. The dual gauge was removed in on 16 June 1921 and the segment from Eidanger to Oklungen Station received dual gauge in November. Because of the break-of-gauge, Eidanger was used as a site of transshipment between Vestfold Line and the standard gauge lines. An underpass near the station for the main road between Brevik and Porsgrunn was built in 1933.

A dual-gauge system was established between Eidanger and Larvik on 22 June 1940, which remained until 15 February 1941, when only standard gauge was used on the Vestfold Line until Larvik. Eidanger Station was electrified along with the Brevik Line and the Bratsberg Line south of Borgestad Station on 19 July 1949. The section east of Eidanger on the Vestfold Line was electrified on 15 October 1956. The line past Eidanger was remote controlled from 20 December 1972. The station was closed for passenger trains on 2 March 1987, although it remained in use as a passing loop. The station received automatic train stop on 18 July 1990.

Three new underpasses for road traffic were built under the line at the station in 1991. Since 2012 a new high-speed section of the Vestfold Line is being built between Porsgrunn and Farriseidet, and thus Eidanger Station will in the future only be located on the Brevik Line. Proposals have called for a bicycle path to be laid on the old section of track, which would see Eidanger as the point of origin.

== Facilities ==
Eidanger was established as a third-class station, but was later upgraded to second class. The station was a standard design created by Balthazar Lange for the Vestfold Line, with the station building measuring 98 square meters (1,050 sq ft) on the ground floor. It featured a ticket office, offices for cargo handling and express cargo, and the station master's office. A separate six-room station master's building was also built, along with an outhouse. The station area had seven tracks, including three which went to the engine shed. During the transshipment era there were twenty-two people working at the station.

Eidanger is located 192.60 kilometers (119.68 mi) from Oslo West Station and at an elevation of 39.4 meters (129 ft) above mean sea level. The station is aligned such that the Bratsberg Line comes in from the west and the Vestfold and Brevik Line come in from the east. Since the closing a passing loop remains at the station.

== Service ==
The bulk of the services at Eidanger was originally a commuter train which ran to between Brevik and Skien. Until the end of the 1940s the station had between ten and twelve daily round trips, but during the 1950s this increased to as high as nineteen, often running at a fixed hourly headway, following the introduction of electric trains. During the late 1940s and 1950s there was correspondence with a bus to Arendal at Brevik. NSB decided to terminate the commuter trains from 1 February 1964, with the express trains followed suit on 26 May 1968. From then Eidanger Station only saw traffic along the Vestfold Line.

Preceding station		Following station
Porsgrunn; Tollskogen	Bratsberg Line	—
—	Vestfold Line	Oklungen; Tjølsrud
—	Brevik Line	Nystrand
