= Brevik Station =

Railway station in Brevik, Norway

Brevik
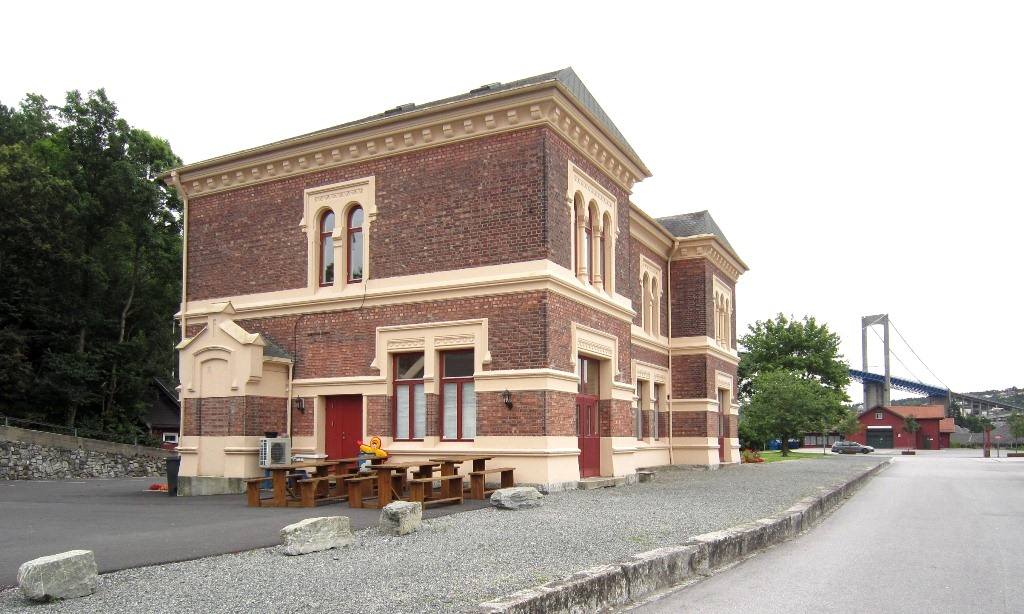

General information
- Location: Brevik, Porsgrunn; Norway
- Coordinates: 59.054°N 9.690°E
- Elevation: 11.6 m (38 ft)
- Owner: Norwegian State Railways
- Line: Brevik Line
- Distance: 202.62 km (125.90 mi)

History
- Opened: 16 October 1895
- Closed: 1 December 1982
Location
- Location within Norway

Brevik Station (Norwegian: Brevik stasjon) is a former railway station located at Strømtangen in the village of Brevik in Porsgrunn, Norway. It served as the terminus of the Brevik Line from 16 October 1895 to the station closed on 1 December 1982. The station building is designed by Paul Due in Romanesque style, is preserved and has been listed as a cultural heritage site. There was a major political discussion if the station should be located at Strømtangen or Setretangen. Construction commenced in 1893 and opened on 15 October 1895. The station initially saw heavy intercity traffic as it served the coastal ferries onwards to Agder until 1927. The main traffic was however a commuter train service to Porsgrunn and Skien, which operated until 1 February 1964. All passenger transport ceased on 26 May 1968. The station building was renovated in the late 1980s and is now used for office space.

== History ==
Proposals for a railway to Brevik were first put forward in 1875, but not until 4 July 1891 did Parliament pass legislation to build the line. With national funding secured, the political debate moved to the location of the station in Brevik. Locations at Setretangen and Strømtangen were proposed. Setretangen would give a station closer to the village center, while Strømtangen would give access to docks which had less ice during winter. A public meeting was called in January 1892 by the proponents of the former to secure public support. As the public seemed to support Strømtangen, the organizers never let the issue come to a vote. The issue was then discussed in the municipal council's executive board, where four against one members supported the Strømtangen alternative. The location was finally decided by the municipal council on 25 June 1892, when sixteen against four aldermen voted in favor of Strømtangen, and subsequently approved by the Norwegian State Railways (NSB).

Leveling of the plateau commenced in 1893, costing 32,000 Norwegian krone (NOK). One house was expropriated to make way for a road to the station and a smith was expropriated on the station area. The small valley of Bjørndalen was filled in and the remains of an old fort were destroyed during the work. A two-story station building was erected, and a new dock for steamships was built lower down, to allow a shortest possible correspondence time between the train and the ships. A spur was built down to the docks, allowing freight trains to level with the ships. Six buildings had to be expropriated in Torsvik. The official opening took place on 15 October 1895, officiated by King Oscar II.

The opening of the station shifted the center of Brevik closer to Strømtangen. While this previously had been a less develop part of the village, several merchants, hotels and restaurants were established in the vicinity of the station. The railway established a section of housing in the Strømstangen and Trosvik area for its employees. The arrival of the railway resulted in a courier service in Brevik. Originally it was part of the station master's wages to hold the privilege to operate a restaurant in the station, which he did until 1922, when it was subcontracted. Its revenue peaked at NOK 25,000 annually in 1925, but then declined significantly after the Kragerø Line opened in 1927. In 1920 the station had thirteen employees, consisting of a station master, two secretaries, four telegraphists, five station workers and one courier. In addition there were employees related to other divisions, such as track and rolling stock maintenance, engineers and conductors. The line past the station was converted from narrow gauge to standard gauge in 1921, and was electrified on 19 June 1949.

The station received a face-lift in the 1930s, at which time the restaurant was moved from the southern to the northern wing. It was moved back after renovations in 1954, which also saw the main entrance moved to the road side and the offices and ticket booths renovated. Water closets were installed. To shorten the distance to the ferry quay, a pedestrian path was built in the 1950s. Following the 1962 opening of the Brevik Bridge the railway saw a sharp decline in patronage as the bus service was rerouted, capturing more of the traffic. Thus NSB decided to terminate the commuter trains to Skien from 1 February 1964. The express trains followed suit and since 26 May 1968 there has only been freight trains on the line. Brevik Station remained in use until 1 February 1982.

With the termination of passenger traffic in 1968, the ground floor became disused. It rented to Trosvik Verkstad, which at first used it for office space. Later it converted the southern part into a physician's office. From 1982 the upper story was also available and rented to the same company, until it went bankrupt in 1986. A series of renovations were carried out, which partially destroyed many dignified aspects of the building. Following the bankruptcy, the station building was sold to Nydalen Compagnie. As they did not use it, the building occupied by homeless, who scavenged the building for molding and similar which was used for firewood, rapidly dilapidating the building. Brevik Management bought the building in 1988, fixed it up and moved their head office there from December 1988. Also the outhouse, which had been disused since the 1960s, was restored. The renovation work was awarded Sparebankens Brevikspris in 1991. The station building and two outhouses were listed as cultural heritage sites in 1997.

== Facilities ==
Brevik Station is located at the southern end of the Brevik Line, 202.62 kilometers (125.90 mi) from Oslo. All the stations on the Brevik Line were designed by Architect Paul Due, and Brevik Station was his third brick station building. It is designed with in a medieval style and dominated by Romanesque motives. As was common for the era, the station was built with a corresponding park. The upper story of the station building was used as a residence for the station master.

The station acted as the central transport hub for Brevik. The Strømtangen area also served, until 1934, as a quay for ferries along the coast, and until 1962 for car ferries across the sound to Stathelle. The bus route to Skien also terminated there. Narvesen established a kiosk at the station, but by the 1950s the traffic had fallen sufficiently that it had to close. There was also a privately run restaurant in the station building and it served as a hub for a courier service.

== Service ==
The Brevik Line had one express train per day which ran to Oslo. Originally connected via the Vestfold Line, it ran via the Bratsberg Line from 1923. The bulk of the services on the line was a commuter train which ran to Porsgrunn and Skien. Until the end of the 1940s the station had between ten and twelve daily round trips, but during the 1950s this increased to as high as nineteen, often running at a fixed hourly headway, following the introduction of electric trains. During the late 1940s and 1950s there was correspondence with a bus to Arendal at Brevik.

Brevik was the furthest along the South Coast that the railway reached at the time it opened, and remained in that position until the opening of the Kragerø Line in 1927. In that period the station acted as a transfer station between the train and steamships for the fastest transport along the coast. The ferry service, Brevikruta, commenced in 1896, and continued until 1934, although it struggled for the last seven years. Plans for a railway ferry service to Continental Europe were launched in 1912. By 1915 Frederikshavn had been settled on and it was argued that it would provide fastest service from Norway to Hamburg, Germany. Two ferries would be required, each using seven hours on a crossing and allowing for two return services per day. However the plans were never carried through.

Preceding station		Following station
Terminus	Brevik Line	Dalen
