= Grenland Bridge =

Bridge in Telemark, Norway

Grenland Bridge Grenlandsbrua
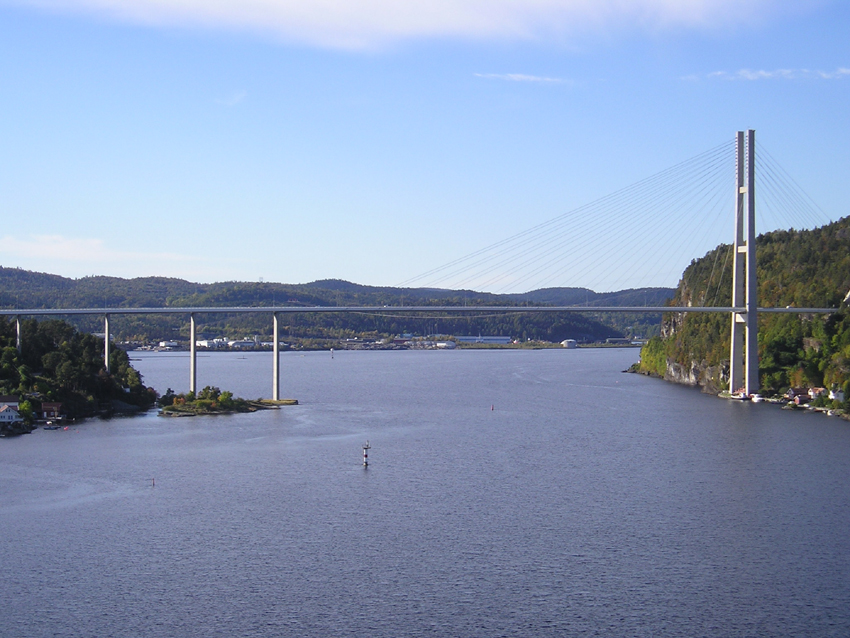
- View of the Grenlandsbrua, seen from Breviksbrua
- Coordinates: 59°03′11″N 9°40′32″E
- Carries: Two lanes of E18
- Crosses: Frierfjord
- Locale: Porsgrunn / Bamble, Telemark, Norway

Characteristics
- Design: Asymmetrical cable-stayed bridge
- Total length: 608 metres (1,995 ft)
- Width: 12 metres (39 ft)
- Height: 168 metres (551 ft)
- Longest span: 305 metres (1,001 ft)
- Clearance below: 50 metres (160 ft)

History
- Construction cost: 180 million kr
- Opened: 1996

Location
- Interactive map of Grenland Bridge

Grenland Bridge (Norwegian: Grenlandsbrua) is Norway's highest cable-stayed bridge with a tower height of 168 metres (551 ft). The bridge, which opened in 1996, is part of the European Route E18 highway and it crosses the Frierfjord, a fjord in Telemark county. The bridge connects the town of Brevik in Porsgrunn Municipality to the town of Stathelle in Bamble Municipality. When built, it replaced Brevik Bridge (Breviksbrua) as the primary route across the fjord.

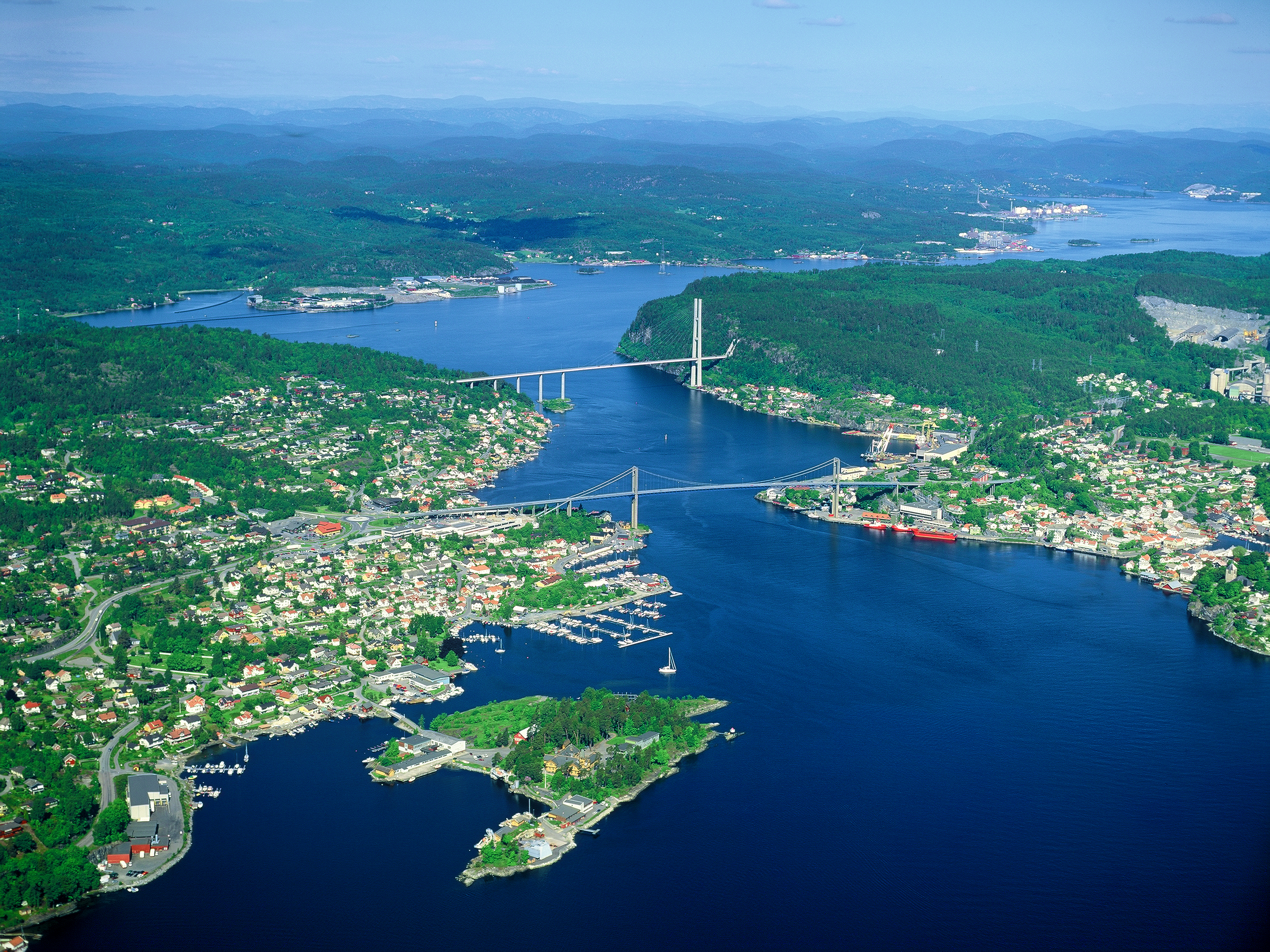
Grenlandsbrua and Breviksbra crossing the Frierfjord

The 608-metre-long (1,995 ft) bridge uses cable stayed construction to provide clearance for vessels up to 50 metres (164 ft) in height. The stay cables are arranged in 21 cable pairs with lengths from 84 to 287 metres (276 to 942 ft). The bridge's span is 305 metres (1,001 ft). It has two lanes, one per direction.

In 2021 the construction of a similar bridge started just west of the existing bridge. It will be opened in 2025, and then there will be four-lane motorway traffic with one direction per bridge.
