= Langesundsfjorden =

Fjord in Telemark, Norway

Langesundsfjorden Brevikfjorden
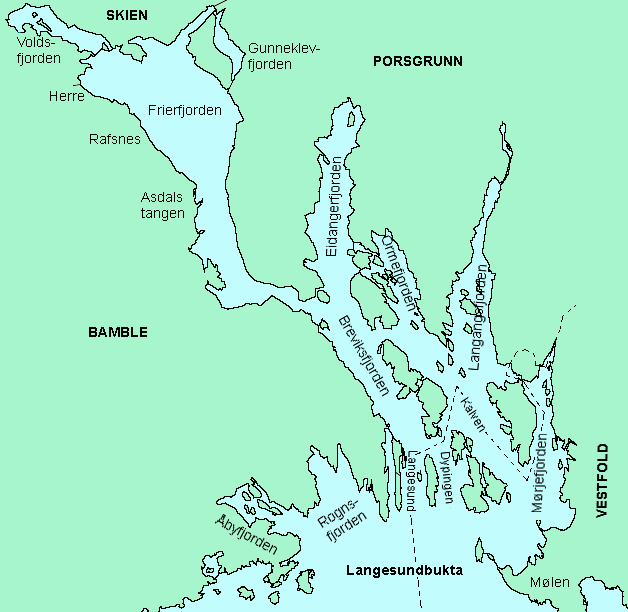
- View of the fjord
- Interactive map of the fjord
- Location: Telemark county, Norway
- Coordinates: 59.02928°N 9.73514°E
- Type: Fjord
- Basin countries: Norway
- Max. length: 8 kilometres (5.0 mi)

Langesundsfjorden or Brevikfjorden is a stretch of fjord in Telemark county, Norway. The 8-kilometre (5.0 mi) long fjord flows from the Skagerrak, between the islands of Sandøya, Bjørkøya, and Siktesøya in Porsgrunn Municipality and the mainland of Bamble Municipality.

== Location ==
The fjord stretches from the Langesund strait near the town of Brevik, where it separates into the Frierfjord and the Eidangerfjord. In the medieval period, the fjord was named Grenmar, after the grener people who lived here and mar which was Old Norse for sea. Later, well into the 1700s, the entire stretch from Langesund gap and up to Skien was referred to as Langesundsfjord.

The Brevik Bridge is a bridge over the mouth of the Frierfjord that connects the municipalities of Bamble and Porsgrunn. On the west side of Bamble lies the town of Stathelle. On the east side lies the town of Brevik in Porsgrunn. The Brevik tunnel (Brevikstunnelen) on Highway 354 (old E18) goes through the hill in Brevik and connects the Brevik bridge with the rest of the way north.

== Geology ==
The Langesundsfjord is especially noted for the discovery of fluorescent minerals. Many of the minerals found here are relatively rare. Commercial quarrying for decorative stone started in the late 1880s. In 1881, Diderik Cappelen (1856-1935), first found Cappelenite in Langesundsfjorden. Cappelenite, which he discovered in small veins within Nepheline syenite pegmatite, is a rare yttrium-barium borosilicate. It is found in the form of greenish-brown hexagonal crystals.

== Media gallery ==
Photos of the Brevik Bridge

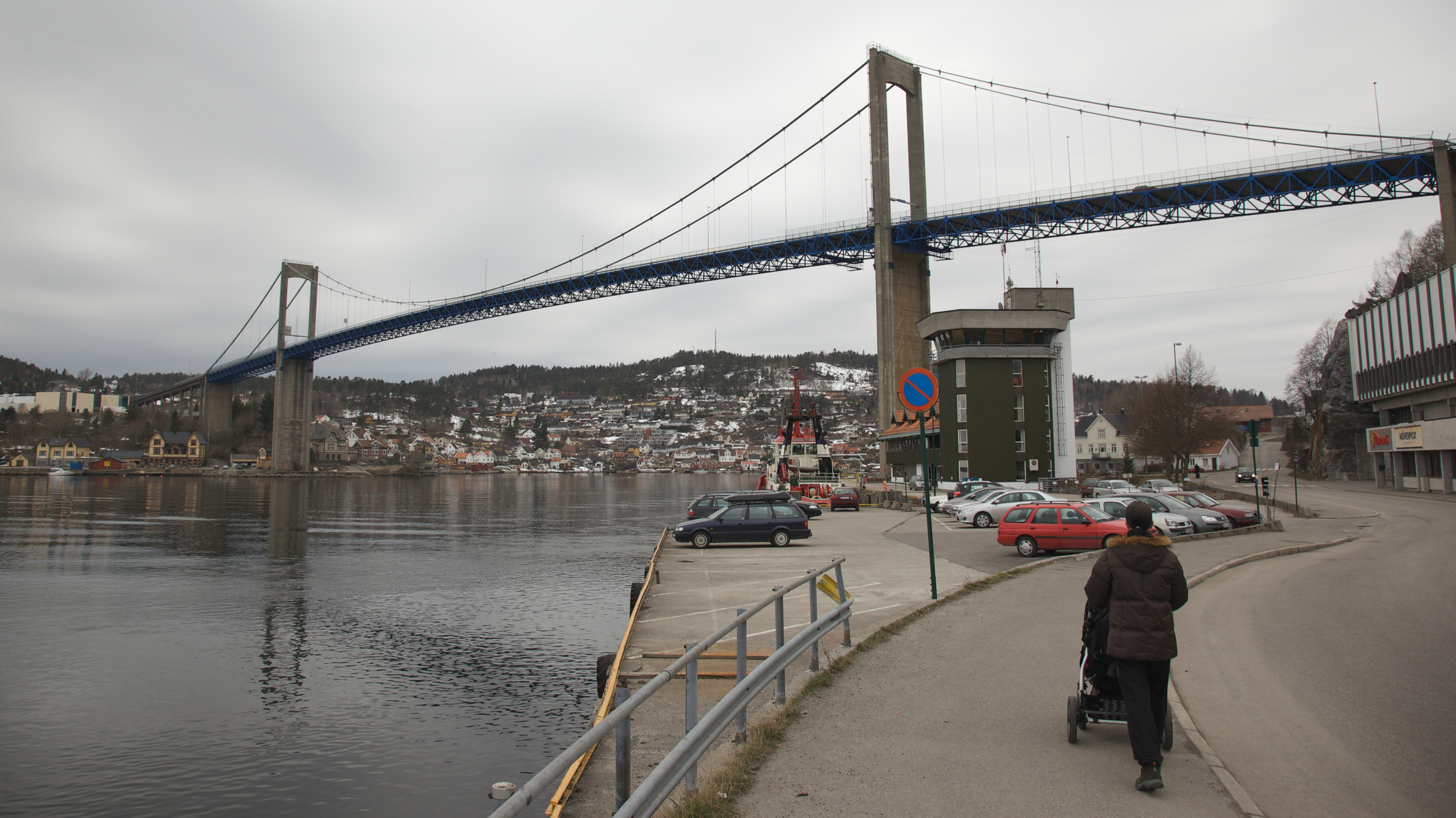

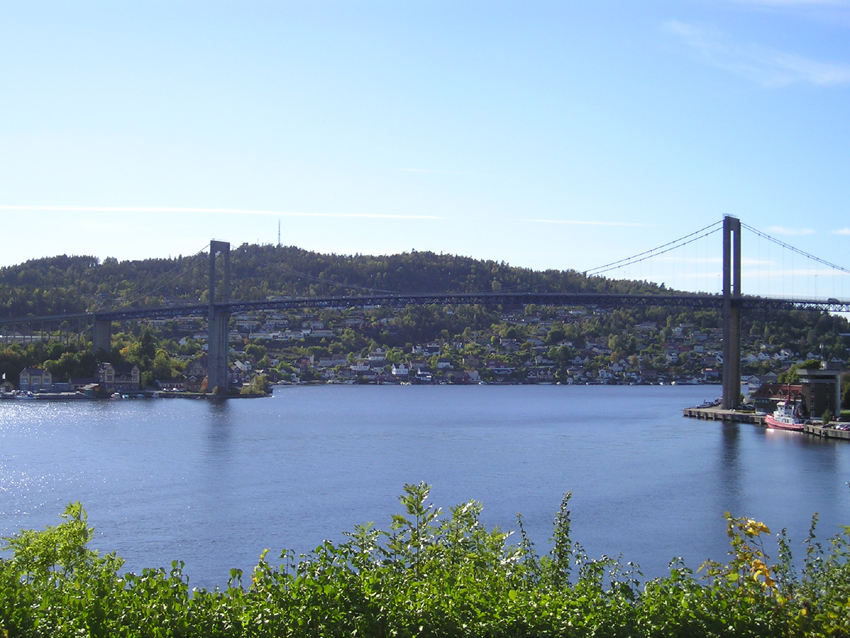

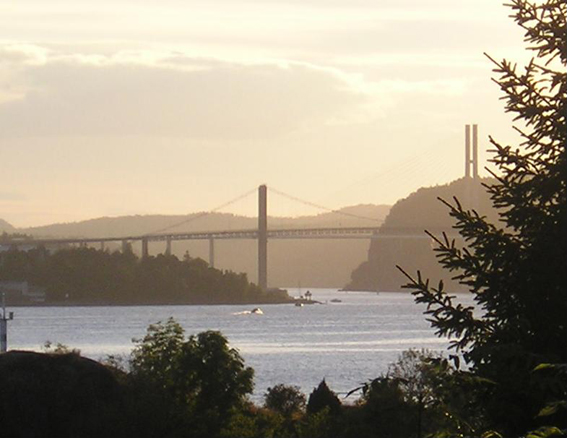

== See also ==
- Grenland
- List of Norwegian fjords
