= Sandøya, Telemark =

Island in Telemark, Norway

Sandøya
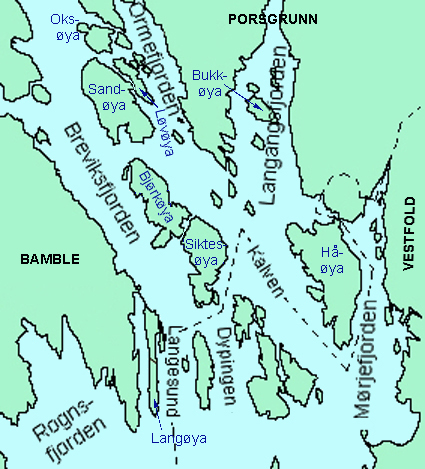
- Sandøya seen together with other islands outside Porsgrunn
- Interactive map of the island

Geography
- Location: Telemark, Norway
- Coordinates: 59.04848°N 9.72926°E
- Area rank: 1.5
- Width: 2 km (1.2 mi)
- Coastline: 1 km (0.6 mi)
- Highest elevation: 7 m (23 ft)

Administration
- Norway
- County: Telemark
- Municipality: Porsgrunn Municipality

Demographics
- Population: 274 (2025)

Sandøya is an island in Porsgrunn Municipality in Telemark county, Norway. The 1.5-square-kilometre (0.58 sq mi) island lies just west of the smaller island of Løvøya and about 2 kilometres (1.2 mi) to the east of the town of Brevik. The island lies at the mouth of the Eidangerfjorden, near where the Frierfjorden joins it to form the Langesundsfjorden. The island is only accessible by boat.

Most of the island's residents live on the southern part of the island, while the northern part of the island is heavily forested. The main urban area on the southwestern shore of the island is known as the village of Sandøya. The 0.32-square-kilometre (79-acre) village has a population (2025) of 274 and a population density of 856 inhabitants per square kilometre (2,220/sq mi). The remainder of the islands residents live right on the shore of the island.

== See also ==
- List of islands of Norway
