= Grenland Terminal =

Railway station and port in Norway

Coordinates: 59°03′58″N 9°41′54″E

The Grenland Terminal (Norwegian: Grenlandsterminalen), also known as the Brevik Terminal (Norwegian: Brevikterminalen), is a combined rail freight terminal and port located at Heistad just north of Brevik in Porsgrunn, Norway. Owned by Grenland Harbour, it is connected to the national railway network by a spur of the Brevik Line, which was connected in 1993.
