= Stathelle Church =

Church in Telemark, Norway

- Stathelle kirke
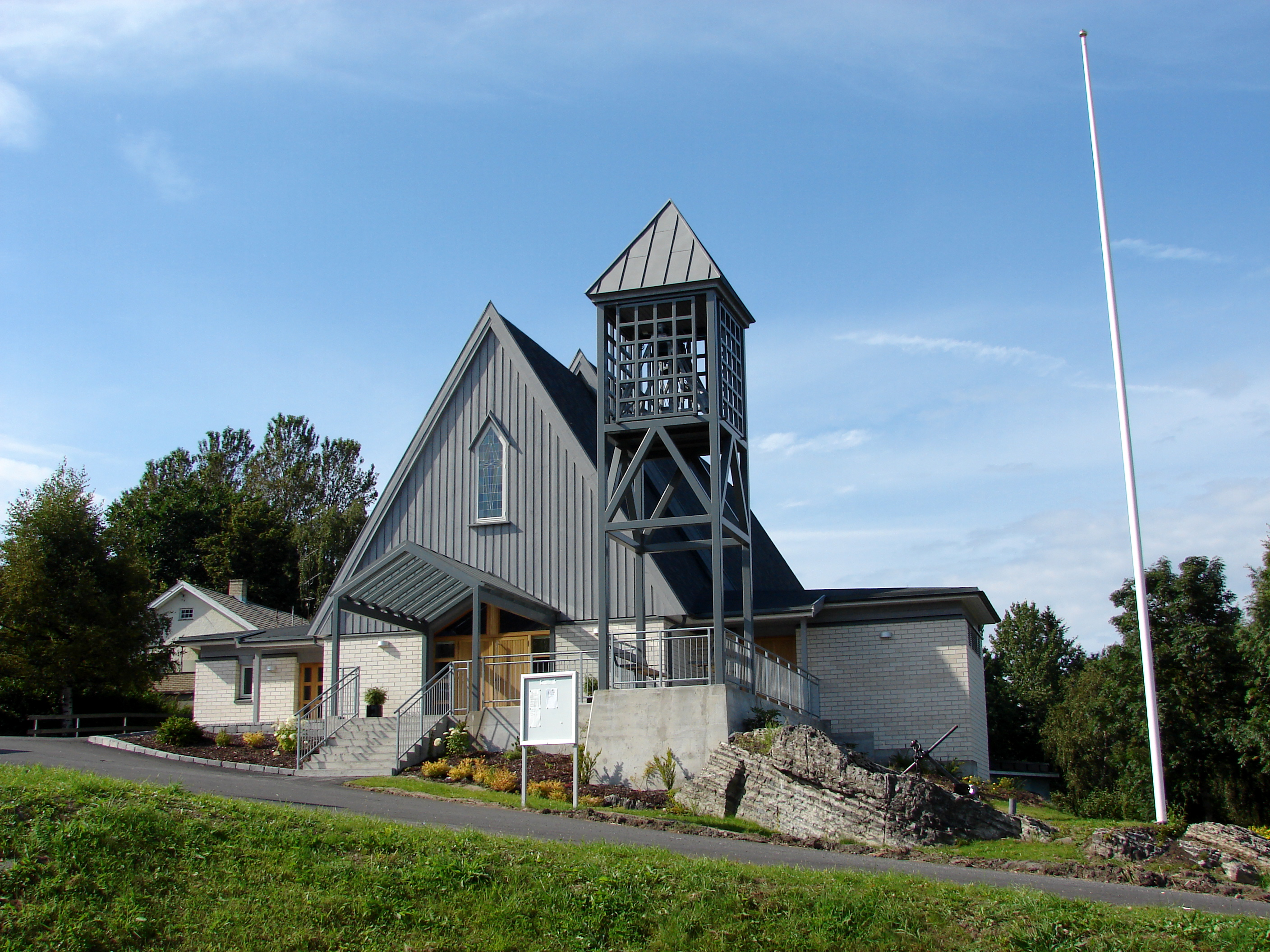
- View of the church
- Stathelle Church
- 59°02′30″N 9°41′58″E
- Location: Bamble Municipality, Telemark
- Country: Norway
- Denomination: Church of Norway
- Churchmanship: Evangelical Lutheran

History
- Former name: Stathelle kapell
- Status: Parish church
- Founded: 1964
- Consecrated: 7 May 1964

Architecture
- Functional status: Active
- Architect: Bjørn Ljungberg
- Architectural type: Rectangular
- Completed: 1964 (62 years ago)

Specifications
- Capacity: 260
- Materials: Brick

Administration
- Diocese: Agder og Telemark
- Deanery: Bamble prosti
- Parish: Stathelle
- Norwegian Cultural Heritage Site
- Type: Church
- Status: Not protected
- ID: 85550

Stathelle Church (Norwegian: Stathelle kirke) is a parish church of the Church of Norway in Bamble Municipality in Telemark county, Norway. It is located in the town of Stathelle. It is the church for the Stathelle parish which is part of the Bamble prosti (deanery) in the Diocese of Agder og Telemark. The white and gray, brick church was built in a rectangular design in 1964 using plans drawn up by the architect Bjørn Ljungberg. The church seats about 260 people.

== History ==
In the 1960s, work began towards building an annex chapel in Stathelle. It was designed by Bjørn Ljungberg. It is a brick building that is partly clad with wood. The nave and chancel are in the same room, giving it a rectangular design. There is a church hall in the room next to the main room too. There is a church porch at the main entrance, there is a second floor seating gallery above the porch, and a bell tower about that. The new church was consecrated by the bishop on 7 May 1964. The church was originally called a chapel, but in the 1990s, the church was made a full parish church and renamed as a church. The building was enlarged in 1988 and again in 2011.

== Media gallery ==
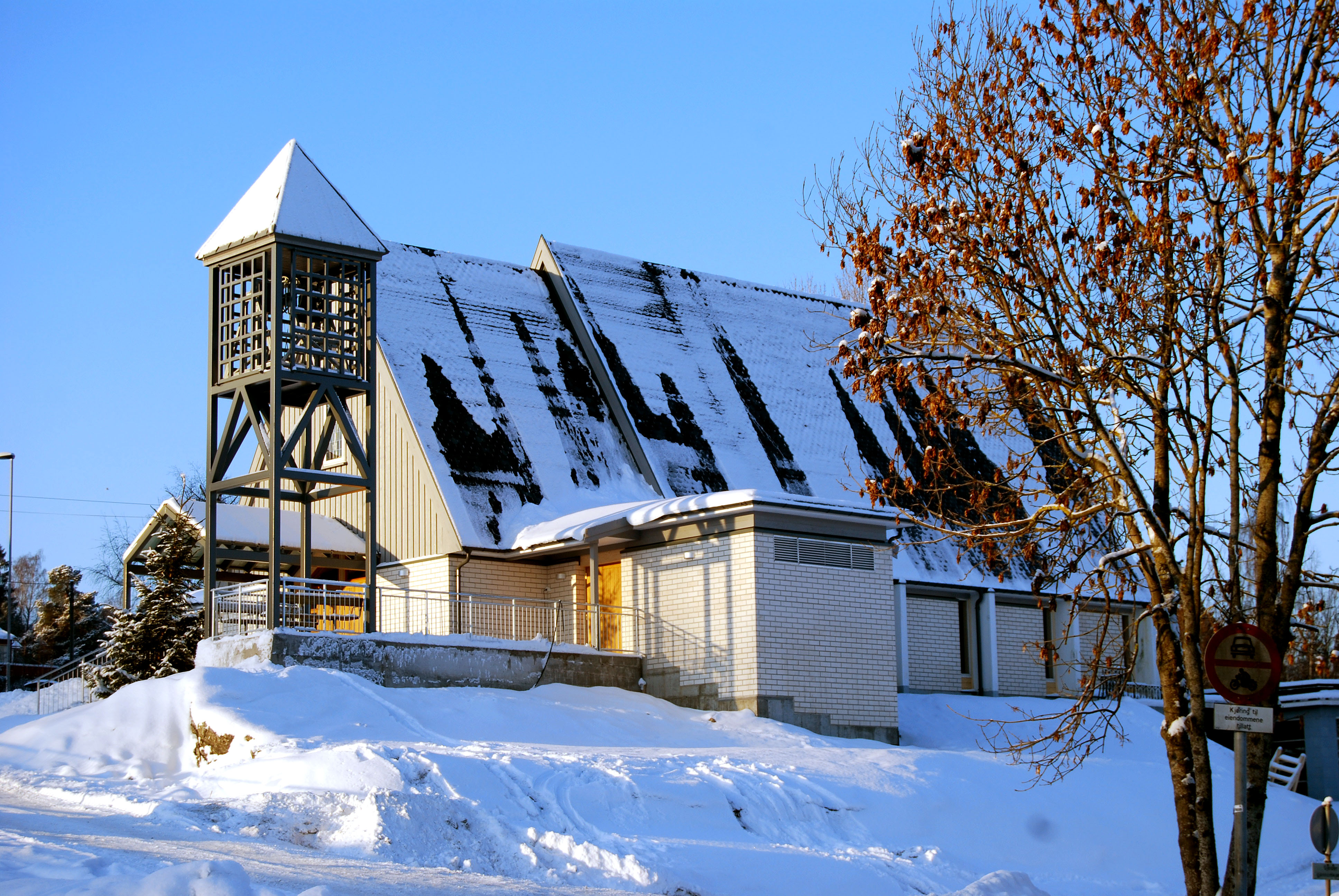

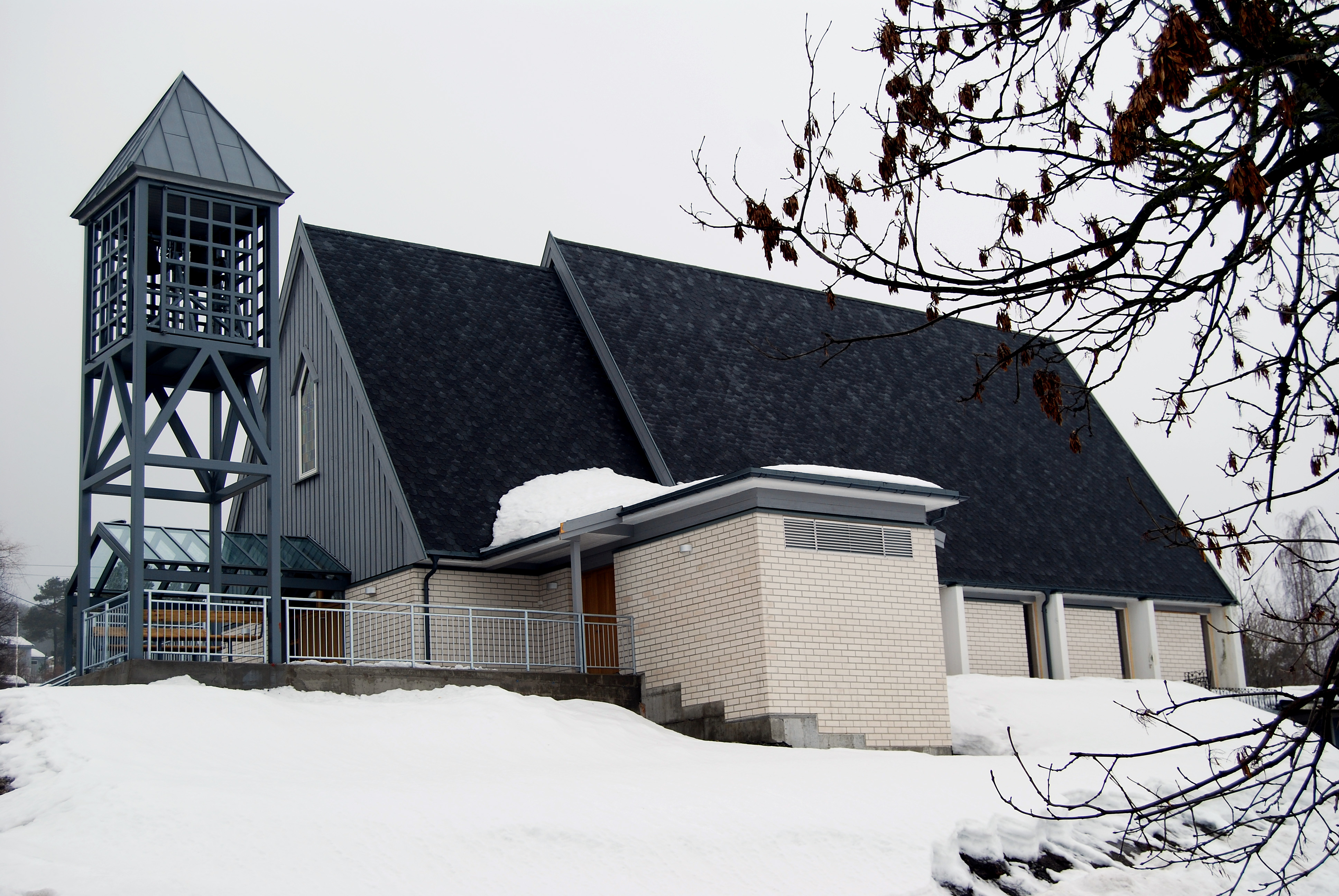

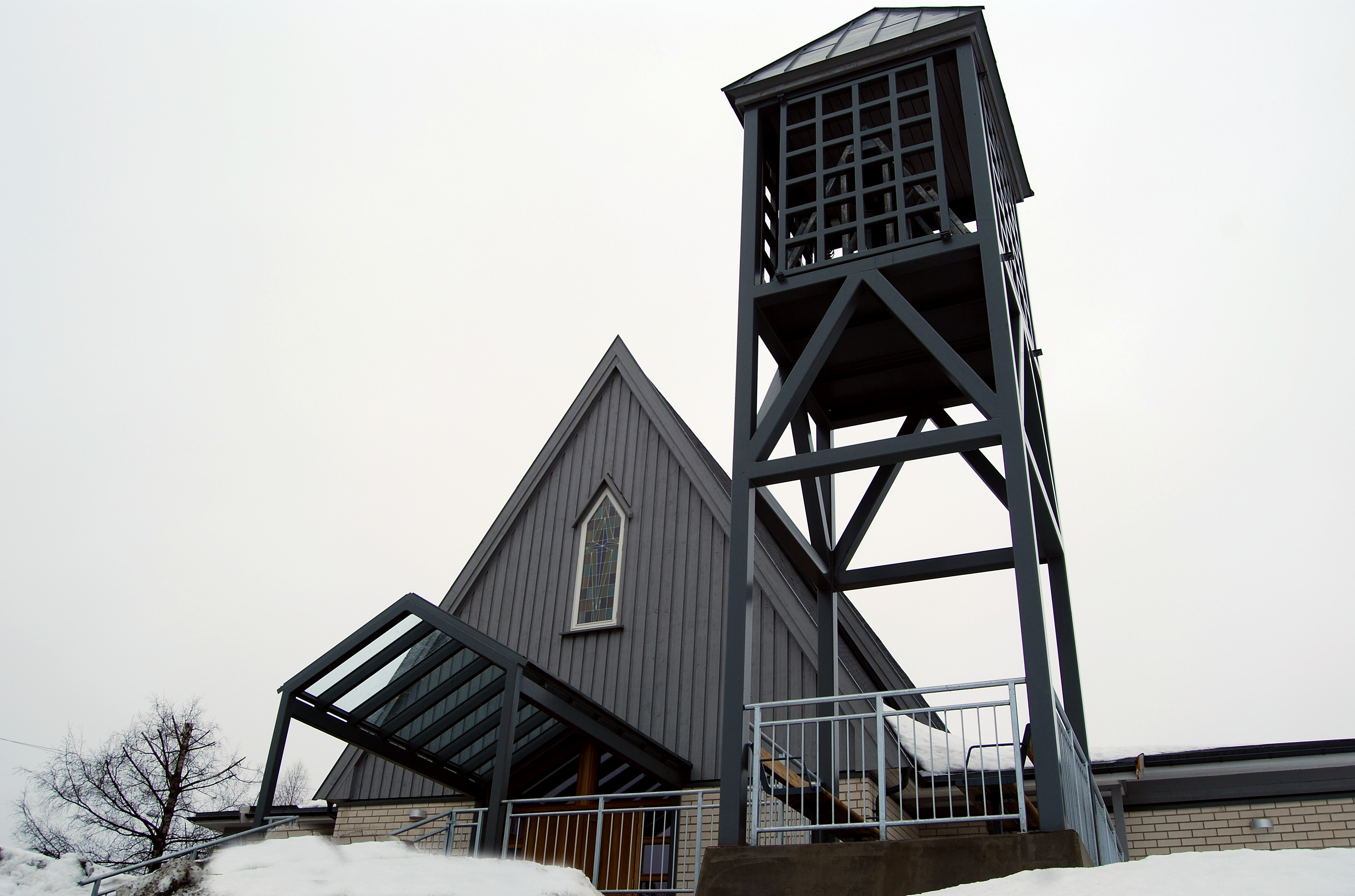

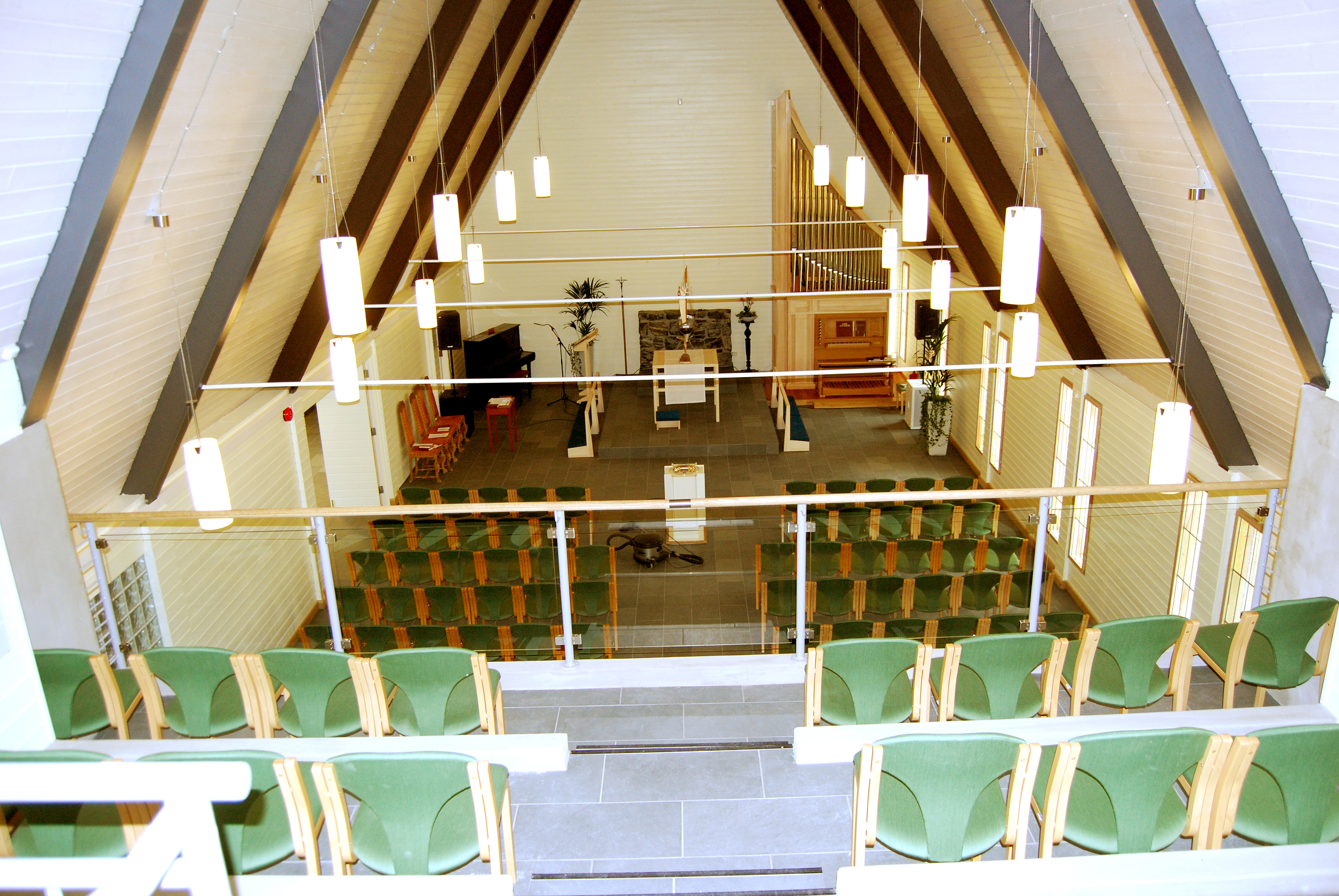

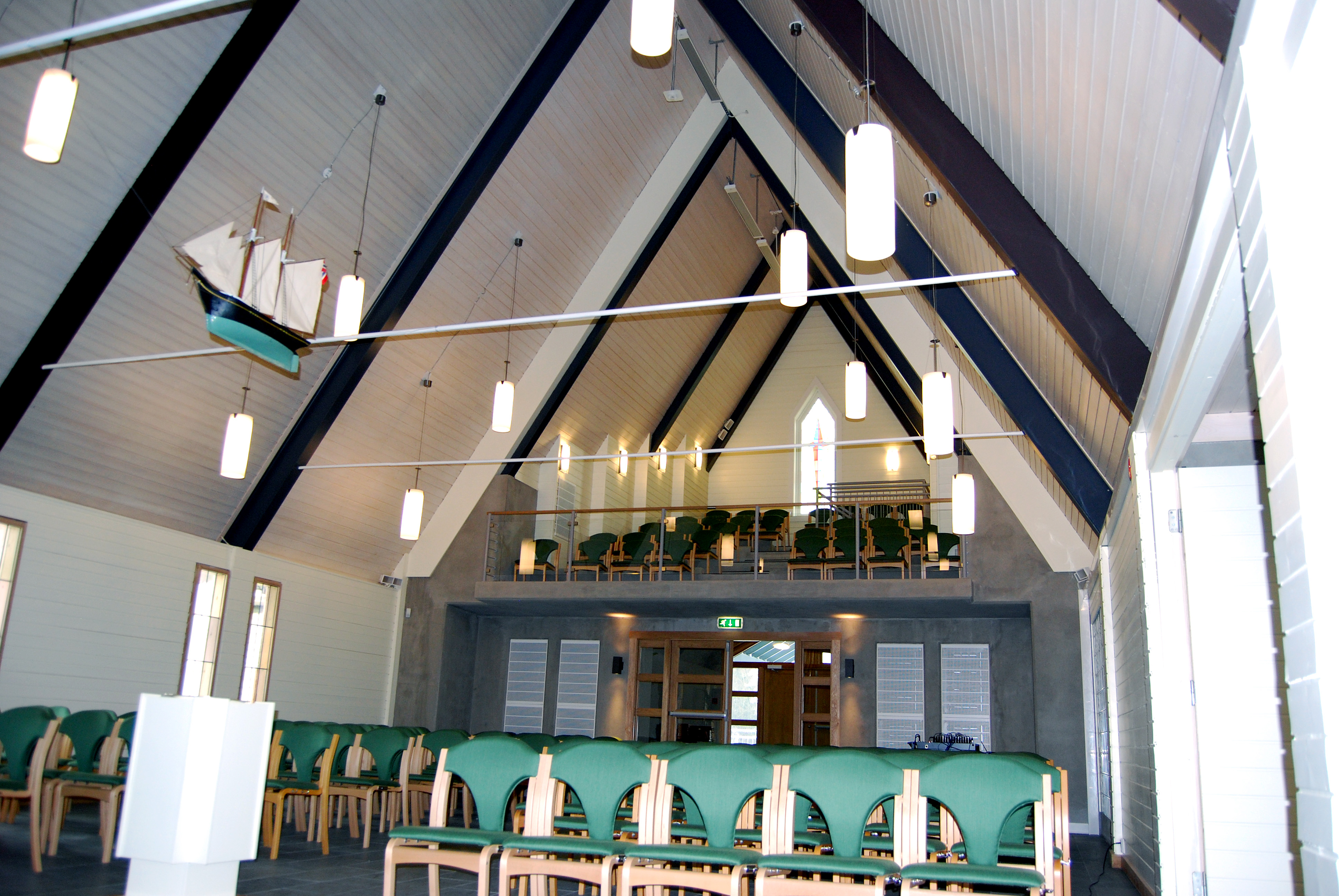

== See also ==
- List of churches in Agder og Telemark
