= Gunnekleivfjorden =

Fjord in Telemark, Norway

- Gunnekleivfjord (unofficial)
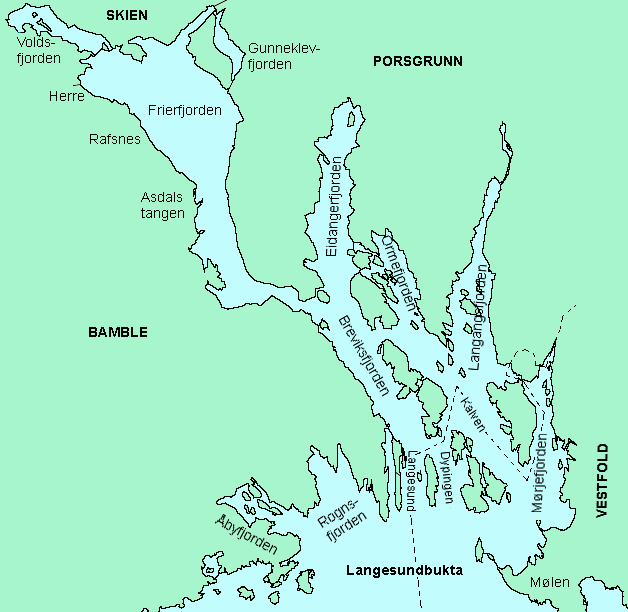
- Map of the fjord system in Grenland, Telemark
- Interactive map of the fjord
- Location: Telemark county, Norway
- Coordinates: 59.12233°N 9.63926°E
- Type: Fjord
- Primary outflows: Porsgrunnselva river
- Catchment area: Skien watershed
- Basin countries: Norway
- Max. length: 2 kilometres (1.2 mi)
- Settlements: Porsgrunn

Gunnekleivfjorden is a fjord in Porsgrunn Municipality in Telemark county, Norway. The 2-kilometre (1.2 mi) long fjord is located at the head of Frierfjord in the town of Porsgrunn.

The fjord's mouth lies on the north end of the fjord where the Porsgrunn River discharges into the Frier fjord at Norsk Hydro's factory complex. The Skien River, which begins in Skien, is called the Porsgrunn River as it runs through Porsgrunn. Small watercraft traffic can also pass through a man-made canal at the south of the fjord.

The fjord is heavily polluted due to the development of the industrial area at Herøya. The fjord has brackish water with a significant amount of fish (both freshwater and saltwater species).

== See also ==
- List of Norwegian fjords
