= Frier, Telemark =

Fjord in Telemark, Norway

Frier
- Frierfjorden
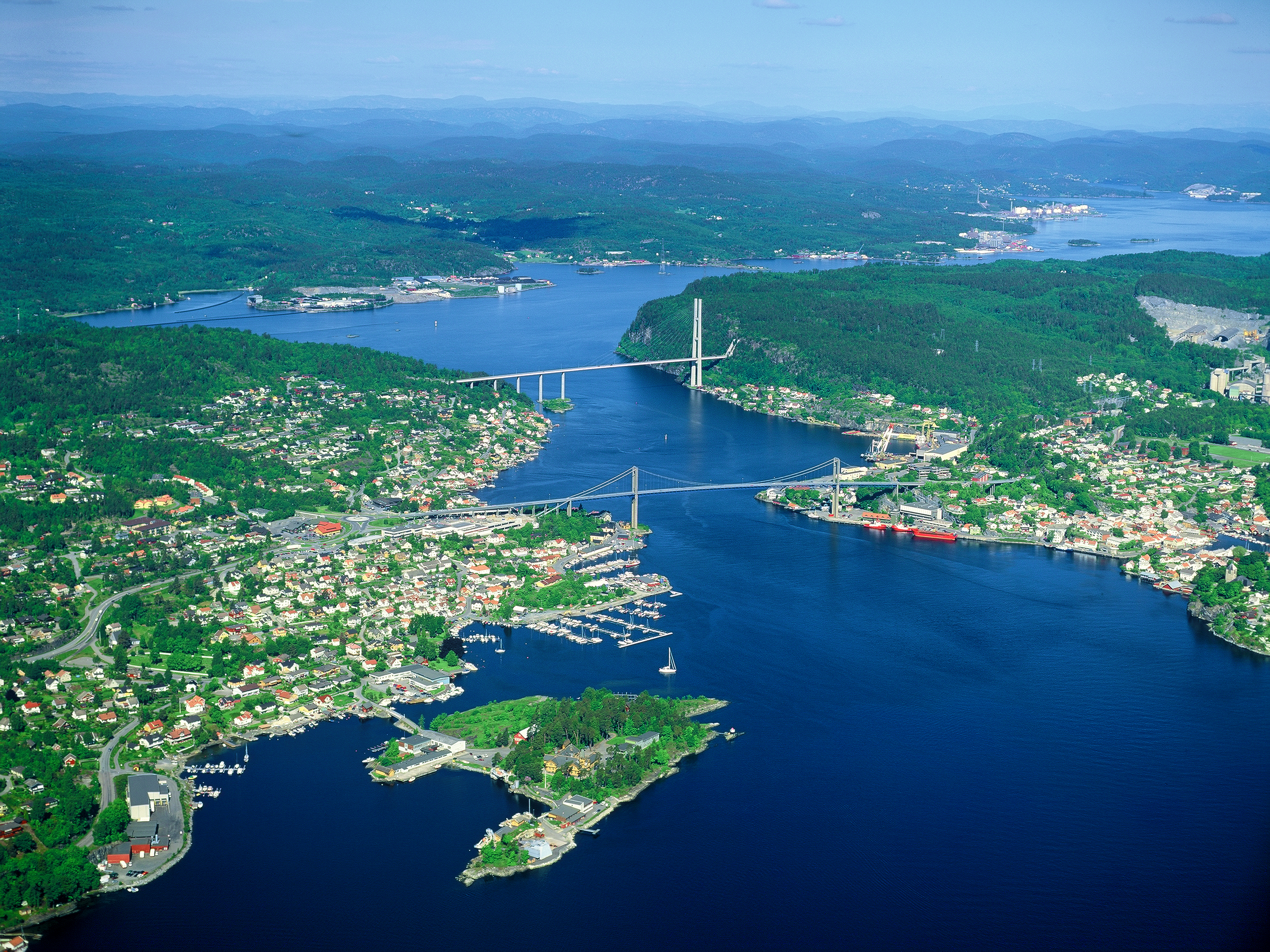
- View of the mouth of Frierfjord (center) with the fjord running to Herøya at upper right. Stathelle is center left and Brevik center right
- Interactive map of the fjord
- Location: Telemark county, Norway
- Coordinates: 59.09931°N 9.61838°E
- Type: Fjord
- Primary inflows: Porsgrunn River
- Primary outflows: Langesundsfjorden
- Catchment area: Skiensvassdraget
- Basin countries: Norway
- Max. length: 14 kilometres (8.7 mi)
- Max. width: 3 kilometres (1.9 mi)
- Average depth: 93 metres (305 ft)
- Settlements: Porsgrunn, Stathelle, Brevik, Herre

Frier or Frierfjorden is a fjord in Telemark county, Norway. The 14-kilometre (8.7 mi) long fjord is located along the Skagerrak coast in the traditional district of Grenland and it forms the border with Bamble Municipality, Skien Municipality, and Porsgrunn Municipality. The fjord is actually an inner arm of the Langesundsfjorden, and historically (well into the 1700s) this fjord was also known as the Langesundsfjorden. The fjord stretches from the opening to Langesundsfjorden in the south to the mouth of the Porsgrunn River in the north. The much smaller fjord of Gunnekleivfjorden opens into the Porsgrunn/Skien River and is separated from the Frierfjorden by the peninsula of Herøya.

The Frierfjorden narrows to a width of about 300 metres (980 ft) at Breviksstrømmen, the mouth of the fjord, where the town of Brevik sits on the northern side and the town of Stathelle lies on the southern side. The Brevik Bridge crosses Breviksstrømmen between the two towns. A little further into the fjord the newer Grenland Bridge crosses the fjord, carrying the European route E18 highway across Norway's highest cable stayed bridge.

The fjord has a great deal of commercial ship traffic, including to Rafnes and Herre in Bamble Municipality, to Norsk Hydro in Porsgrunn Municipality, and formerly to Norske Skog Union in Skien Municipality.

== Name ==
The fjord is named Frier (Old Norse: Friðir). The name is derived from the word fríðr which means "beautiful" or "lovely". The official name of the fjord is Frier. Frierfjorden is also an approved name, but that one is "not prioritized".

== Media gallery ==
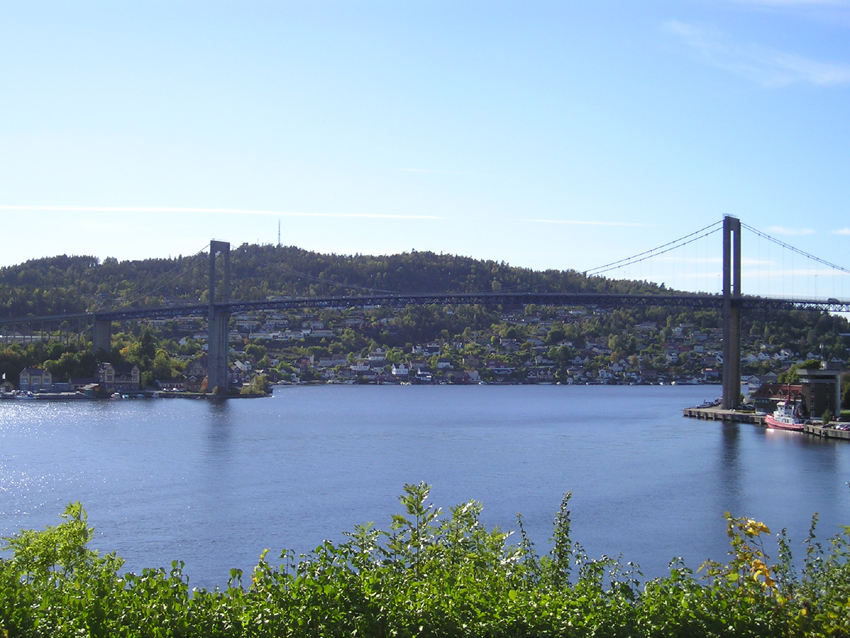
Brevik Bridge

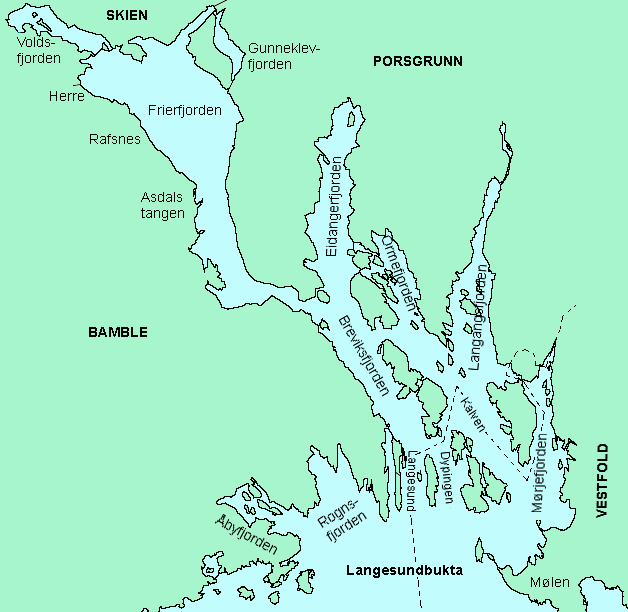
Fjord system in Grenland, Telemark

Tug boats near Norsk Hydro at Herøya, Porsgrunn Municipality

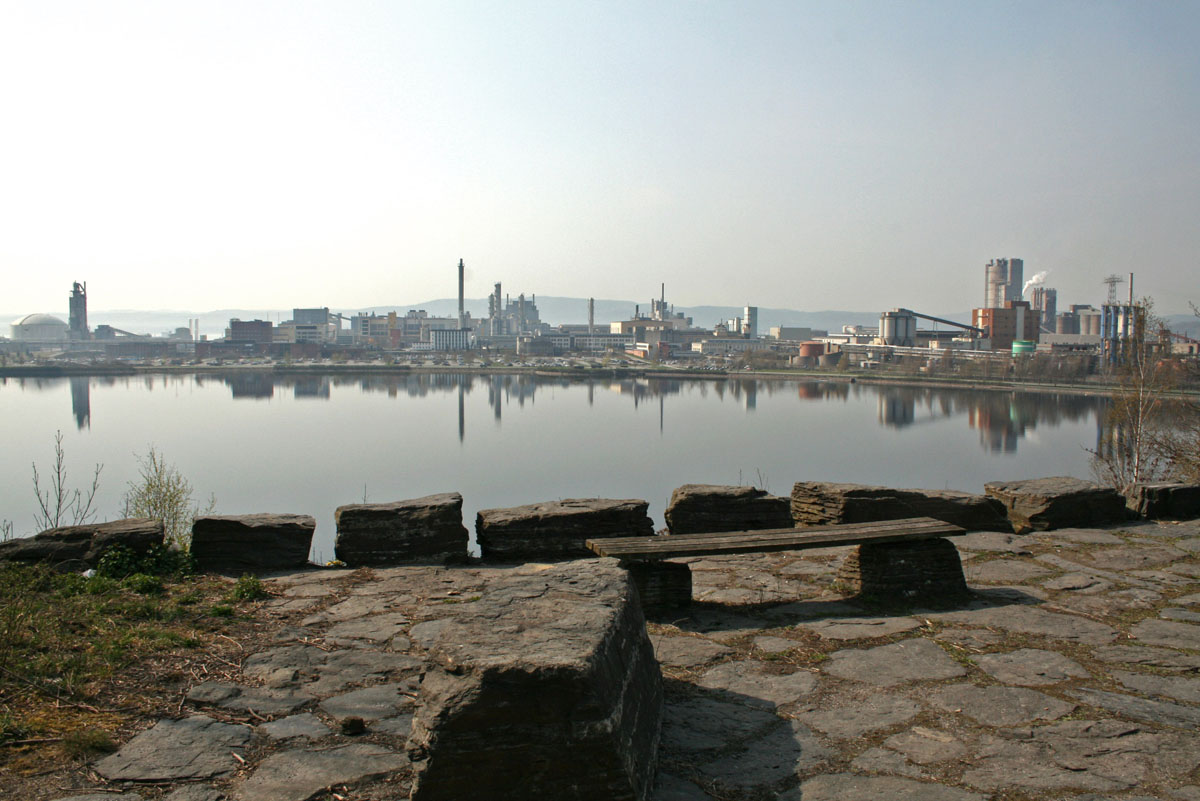
Herøya, and the large industries

== See also ==
- List of Norwegian fjords
