= Nystrand Station =

Disused railway station in Porsgrunn, Norway

Nystrand

General information
- Location: Eidanger, Porsgrunn Municipality; Norway
- Coordinates: 59.11040°N 9.69770°E
- Elevation: 38.3 m (126 ft)
- Owner: Norwegian State Railways
- Line: Brevik Line
- Distance: 195.35 km (121.38 mi)

Construction
- Architect: Paul Due

History
- Opened: 15 July 1895
- Closed: 31 May 1970
Location
- Location within Norway

Nystrand Station (Norwegian: Nystrand stasjon) is a disused railway station located at Eidanger in Porsgrunn Municipality, Norway, on the Brevik Line. Designed by Paul Due, it was located 195.35 kilometers (121.38 mi) from Oslo. The station opened on 15 July 1895, three months before the rest of the line. Nystrand was largely used for recreational visits to Eidangerfjorden from townspeople in Porsgrunn and Skien. The station was served by a commuter train service until 1964, and has not seen regular calls by trains since 1968. It was formally closed on 31 May 1970. The station building has been preserved at Porsgrunn Town Museum.

== History ==
Proposals for a railway to Brevik were first put forward in 1875, but not until 4 July 1891 did Parliament pass legislation to build the line. The main proponent for the line was Brevik Municipality, while Eidanger Municipality was less eager. Brevik therefore agreed to pay for all expropriations for the right-of-way within Eidanger. However, Eidanger Municipality wanted a branch of the Brevik Line to Eidangerfjorden somewhere south of Nystrand, but this was never fulfilled.

The station was opened on 15 July 1885 and became the temporary terminus of the Brevik Line until the remainder of the line opened on 16 October. The line past the station was electrified on 19 July 1949. The station was staffed until 1 June 1964, and no trains called at the station after 25 May 1968. The station was officially closed on 13 May 1970. The station building was later moved to Porsgrunn Town Museum.

== Facilities ==
Nystrand was a fifth-class station designed by Paul Due. Nystrand was nearly identical to Skjelstad Station and Heistad Station, although it had a slightly larger waiting room. Just north of the station the line went through one of, at the time it was built, largest cuttings in Norway. The station lacked a separate cargo building and this was instead handled at the station building. A separate four-room house was built for the station master. The station was located 195.45 kilometers (121.45 mi) from Oslo West Station and at an elevation of 38.3 meters (126 ft) above mean sea level.

A major source of traffic to Nystrand were townspeople from Skien and Porsgrunn who traveled to Eidangerfjorden for recreation. This gave a disproportion of the traffic at the station, with peaks during holidays and weekends during the summer. It also spurred the construction of cabins in the area, as they were readily accessible to the wealthy in Porsgrunn and Skien. Two grocery stores were established next to the station and there was a primary and lower secondary school nearby.

== Service ==
The Brevik Line had one express train per day which ran to Oslo. Originally connected via the Vestfold Line, it ran via the Bratsberg Line from 1923. The bulk of the services on the line was a commuter train which ran to Porsgrunn and Skien. Until the end of the 1940s the station had between ten and twelve daily round trips, but during the 1950s this increased to as high as nineteen, often running at a fixed hourly headway, following the introduction of electric trains.

The early opening of the segment to Nystrand in 1895 allowed the Norwegian State Railways (NSB) to operate a season of seaside trips from the twin towns of Skien and Porsgrunn, selling 9,600 tickets in July and August of that year. During the 1930s NSB put in seasonal trains from Kongsberg which ran to Nystrand and Brevik marketed as the "bathing train" and targeted seaside visitors from the interior market.

| Preceding station | | Following station |
|---|---|---|
| Prestealleen | Brevik Line | Mule |
