= Brevik Bridge =

Bridge in Telemark, Norway

Brevik Bridge Breviksbrua
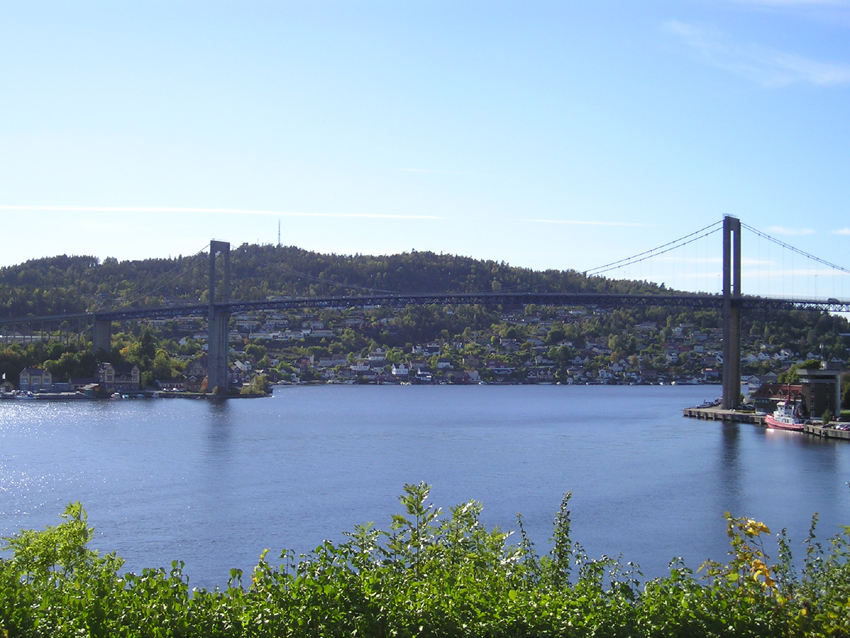
- View of the bridge
- Coordinates: 59°03′00″N 9°41′40″E
- Crosses: Frierfjord
- Locale: Telemark, Norway
- Named for: Brevik
- Owner: Norwegian Public Roads Administration
- Heritage status: Protected
- Bridge number: 08-0580

Characteristics
- Design: Suspension bridge
- Material: Concrete and steel
- Total length: 677 metres (2,221 ft)
- Width: 10.3 metres (34 ft)
- Height: 80 metres (260 ft)
- Longest span: 272 metres (892 ft)
- No. of spans: 19
- Piers in water: 2
- Clearance below: 45 metres (148 ft)

History
- Opened: 26 May 1962

Brevik Bridge (Norwegian: Breviksbrua) is one of two bridges that span the mouth of the Frierfjord. It connects Bamble Municipality and Porsgrunn Municipality in Telemark county. On the west side, in Bamble, lies the town of Stathelle, while on the east side lies the town of Brevik in Porsgrunn.

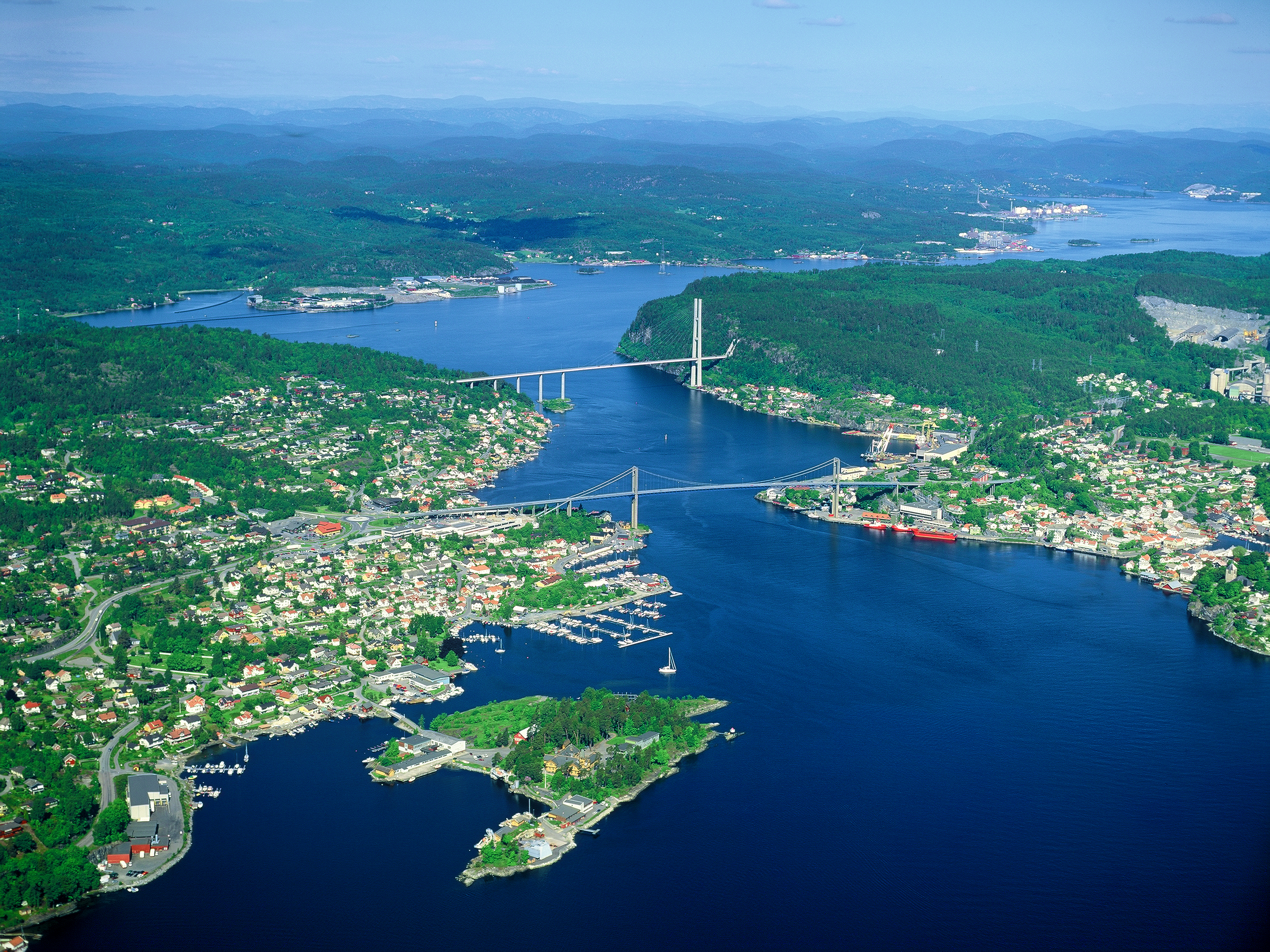
Breviksbrua and Grenlandsbrua over the Frierfjord

When the bridge opened in May 1962, it was part of the European route E18 highway. In 1996, the nearby Grenland Bridge (Grenlandsbrua) opened, taking over this role. Today, it is part of national road 354.

== Protection ==
In 1997, the Norwegian Public Roads Administration and Norwegian Directorate for Cultural Heritage were ordered to prepare a protection plan for state-owned roadworks in Norway. The final report published in 2002, National Protection Plan for Roads, Bridges, and Road-Related Cultural Heritage, recommended that both Brevik Bridge and Grenland Bridge be protected. On April 17, 2008, the Directorate for Cultural Heritage officially protected the bridges' "construction and details" in accordance with the Cultural Heritage Act.

== 2013 incident ==
On Saturday August 3, 2013, Linn Madelen Bråthen, age 33, was found dead on the shores of Sandøya. The police initially assumed the death was the result of a suicide jump from the Brevik Bridge. Several days later the police announced they had charged a police officer with providing false testimony. CCTV footage of the suspect together with Bråthen walking towards the bridge the night she died caused suspicion. The suspect was eventually charged with first-degree murder as the police thought he had pushed or thrown Bråthen off the bridge. Due to a lack of evidence the charge was changed to leaving Bråthen helpless, which lead to her death.

In the Nedre Telemark District Court, the suspect was found guilty and sentenced to 3 years in prison. In the Agder court of appeal he was still found guilty, but the prison time was reduced by 6 months. The suspect tried to get the case heard by the Supreme Court, but they rejected the case.
