= NSB Class 32 =

Class of Norwegian steam locomotives

NSB type 32
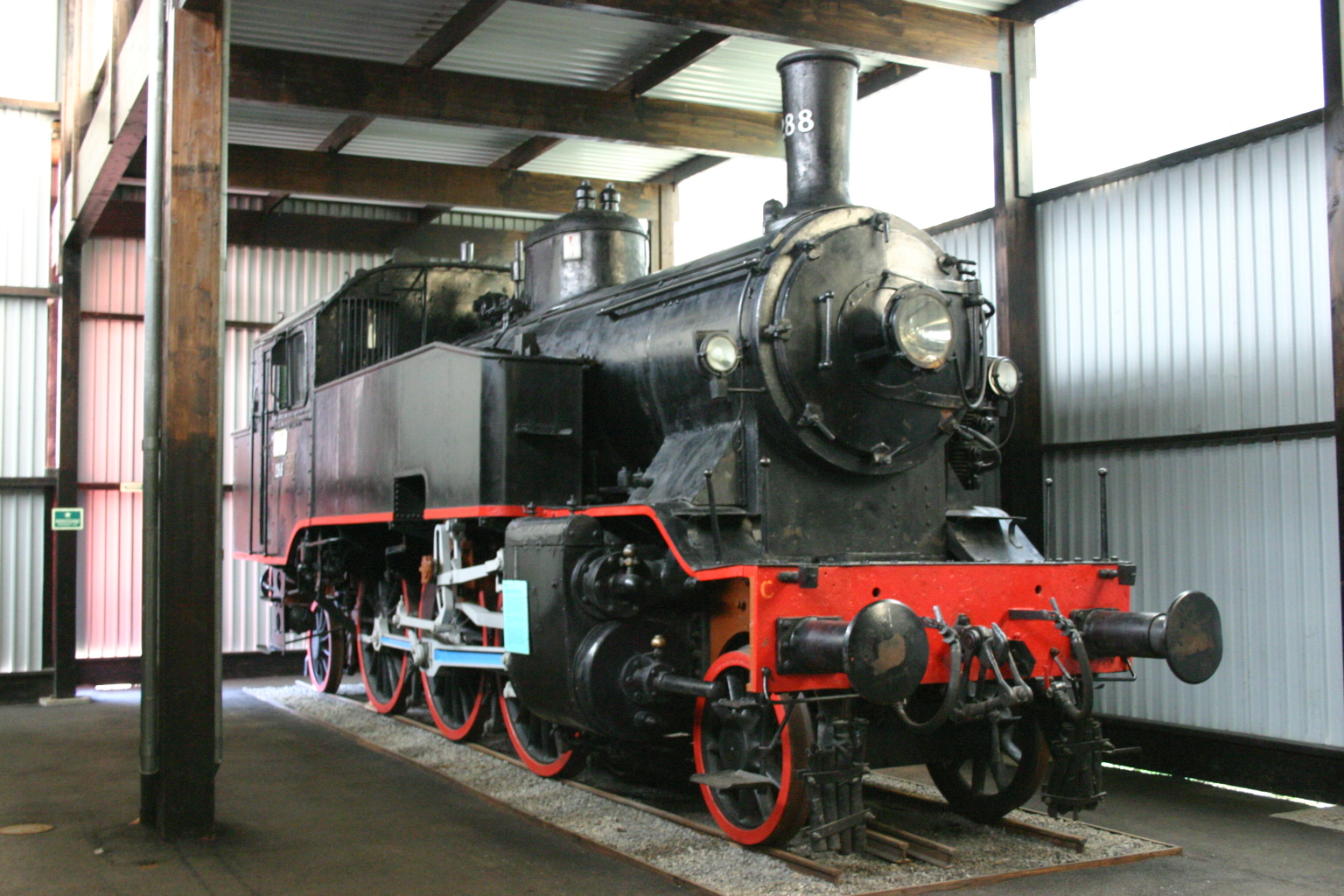
- No. 288 at the Norsk Jernbanemuseum in Hamar
Type and origin
- Power type: Steam
- Builder: Hamar, Falun, Balwin
- Build date: 1915, 1917-1921
- Total produced: 24
Specifications
- Configuration
  - Whyte: 2-6-2
  - UIC: 1'C1'Th2
- Gauge: 4 ft 8 1/2 in (1,435 mm) standard gauge
- Driver dia.: 1,600 mm (5 ft 3 in)
- Wheelbase: 3,600 mm (11 ft 10 in)
- Length: 32a: 11,300 mm (37 ft 1 in); 32b/c: 11,495 mm (37 ft 8.6 in)
- Loco weight: 32a: 52.4 t (57.8 short tons; 51.6 long tons); 32b: 52.2 t (57.5 short tons; 51.4 long tons); 32c: 52.9 t (58.3 short tons; 52.1 long tons)
- Total weight: 32a: 66.6 t (73.4 short tons; 65.5 long tons); 32b: 66.3 t (73.1 short tons; 65.3 long tons); 32c: 66.8 t (73.6 short tons; 65.7 long tons)
- Fuel type: Coal
- Fuel capacity: 2.5 t (2.8 short tons; 2.5 long tons)
- Water cap.: 7.3 m^{3} (1,600 imp gal)
- Firebox
  - Grate area: 32a: 1.62 m^{2} (17.4 sq ft); 32b/c:1.8 m^{2} (19 sq ft)
- Boiler pressure: 12 kg/cm^{2} (170 psi)
- Heating surface
  - Firebox: 32a: 88.1 m^{2} (948 sq ft); 32b/c:83.7 m^{2} (901 sq ft)
- Superheater
  - Heating area: 32a: 27 m^{2} (290 sq ft); 32b/c:25.6 m^{2} (276 sq ft)
- Cylinders: 2
- Cylinder size: 525 mm × 600 mm (20.7 in × 23.6 in)
Performance figures
- Maximum speed: Forward: 75 km/h (47 mph); Reverse: 75 km/h (47 mph)
- Factor of adh.: 32a: 43.6 t (48.1 short tons; 42.9 long tons); 32b: 43.2 t (47.6 short tons; 42.5 long tons); 32c: 43.4 t (47.8 short tons; 42.7 long tons)
Career
- Operators: Norwegian State Railways, NHJ
- Class: NSB type 32a / 32b / 32c NHJ litra D
- Numbers: D13–D14 (NHJ), 283, 286–291, 331–335, 384–390, 407–409
- Withdrawn: 1969
- Preserved: 1 preserved

The NSB Type 32 was built between 1915 and 1921 by Baldwin Locomotive Works, the Vagn- & Maskinfabriksaktiebolaget Falun and Hamar Jernstøberi for the Norges Statsbaner (NSB), the state railway company in Norway. The Norsk Hoved-Jernbane (NHJ) also received two locomotives.

== History ==
The locomotives were designed with Heusinger controls for use on the Dovrebane as push pull locomotives. It proved itself a good engine and was therefore the class was also used in and around Oslo, Stavanger, Bergen and Trondheim .

On the Dovrebane, the locomotives were permanently stationed at Trondheim, Støren, Drivstua and Dombås as bankers.

In Narvik the class was used on the Ofotbane, the 32b and 32c locomotives were used for construction trains and only occasionally ran regular trains.

The sub-types differed only slightly. The 32b and 32c were somewhat longer than the 32a, and there were also differences in the heating surface and the superheater heating surface .

=== Type 32a ===
Seven locomotives of this type were built by Hamar Jernstøberi in 1915. Another three locomotives were made in 1921, delivered by the Swedish locomotive factory Vagn- & Maskinfabriksaktiebolaget Falun.

=== NHJ D" ===
Due to the positive experience, follow-up orders were placed with Baldwin in 1917. With factory nos. 45940 and 45941 they were delivered to the Norsk Hoved-Jernbane. The NHJ D series was assigned the numbers D13 and D14. When the NHJ was taken over as the Oslo district on March 4, 1926, by the Norges Statsbaner (NSB), the two locomotives kept their running numbers but were assigned to the 32b series.

=== Type 32b ===
Another five Baldwin locomotives were ordered and delivered directly to NSB. Serial numbers 45837 and 45839 were delivered in 1917, the other three locomotives from the same order lot did not follow until 1918. These Baldwin locomotives had problems with their weight distribution. The rearmost driving axle had an axle load that was too low.

=== Type 32c ===
In 1919, six more locomotives were ordered from Baldwin . As with the 32b, delivery in 1920 and 1921. These engines did not have the same problem with their weight distribution as this had been rectified.

== Use in service ==
32b Nos. 13 and 32b 14 were stationed in Narvik from 1940 to 1941. Locomotives nos. 32b 335 and 32c 390 were mainly used for overhauling and repairing overhead lines. In the event of a power failure, they took over the regional trains.

32c no. 384 was the first locomotive to be withdrawn on December 15, 1954. The majority followed in the years 1955 to 1965. The second to last locomotive left in service was 32a no. 290, which was withdrawn on February 8, 1967, and the last locomotive to be withdrawn was 32a no. 288 on April 21, 1969.

== Preservation ==
32a No. 288 is also the only locomotive of the class that has survived into preservation and is now on static display in the locomotive hall of the Norsk Jernbanemuseum in Hamar.

== External links and Sources ==
- Bjerke, Thor; Hansen, Trond B.; Johansson, Erik W.; Sando, Svein E. (1987). Steam locomotives in Norway. Norwegian Railway Club. pp. 114, 184–186. ISBN 82-90286-09-0.
- Database about rullende jernbanemamaterial brukt i Norge. Norsk Jerbaneklubb, accessed 07-03-2023 (Norwegian).
- Information about the NSB steam locomotive type 32b. GamleNarvik.no, accessed 07-03-2023 (Norwegian).
- Steam locomotive type 32c 384 on svingskiven out for verkstedhallen hos A/S Frichs Maskinfabrik og Kedelsmedie, Århus, Denmark. accessed 07-03-2023 (Norwegian).
- Type 32 – Jernbane.net (Norwegian).
