= Port of Grenland =

Port in Norway

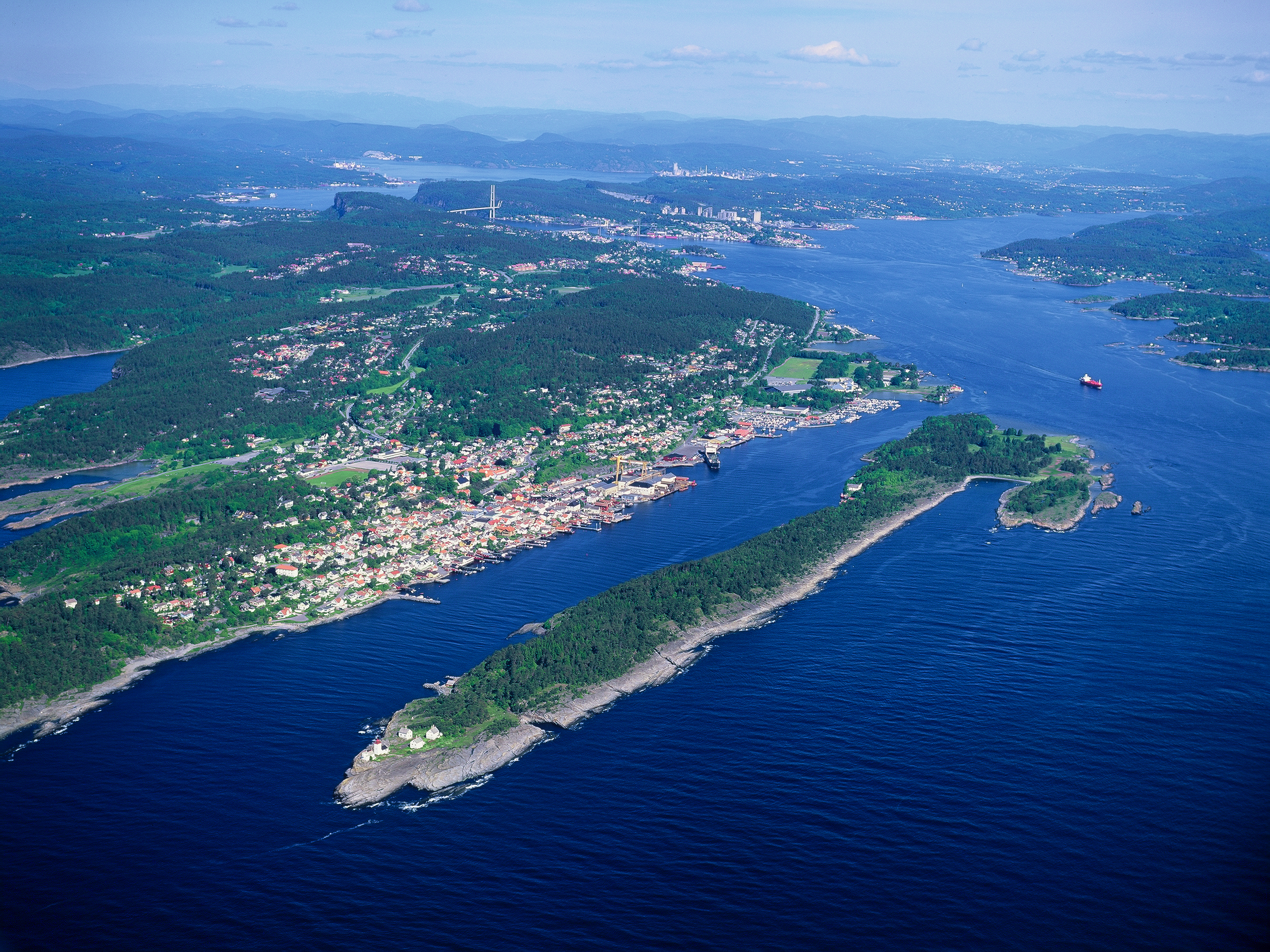
Langesund

Port of Grenland (Norwegian: Grenland Havn) is the port authority serving the Grenland region of Telemark county, Norway. The area is located in Skien Municipality, Porsgrunn Municipality and Bamble Municipality. It operates four ports, at Skien, Porsgrunn, Grenland Terminal at Brevik, and Langesund. The agency is owned as an inter-municipal company.
