= Farriseidet =

Moraine in Larvik, Norway

Coordinates: 59°03′N 10°01′E

Farriseidet is a moraine located in the northwestern part of the town center of Larvik, Norway. It separates Larvikfjorden from the lake of Farris.
