= Eidangerfjorden =

Fjord in Telemark, Norway

- Eidangerfjord (unofficial)
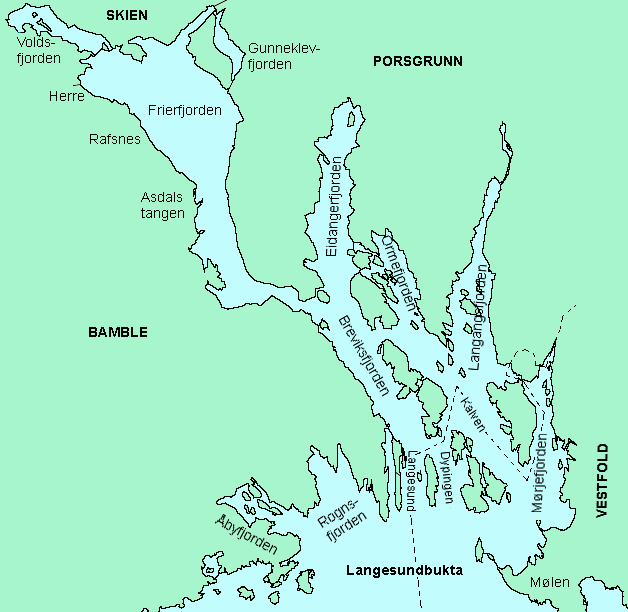
- View of the fjord system in Grenland, Telemark
- Interactive map of the fjord
- Location: Telemark county, Norway
- Coordinates: 59.07135°N 9.70483°E
- Type: Fjord
- Basin countries: Norway
- Max. length: 6 kilometres (3.7 mi)
- Settlements: Brevik

Eidangerfjorden is a fjord in Porsgrunn Municipality in Telemark county, Norway. The 6-kilometre (3.7 mi) long fjord stretches from the village area of Eidanger south to the Langesundsfjorden. The mouth of the Eidangerfjorden is located between the town of Brevik and the island of Sandøya. The largest island located in the fjord is Kattøya, located near the head of Eidangerfjorden.

The shipping harbor for the cement produced by Norcem is located on the Eidangerfjorden at Brevik. Further in, on the west shore, lies the village of Heistad. The towns of Stathelle and Brevik are situated at the junction of the Langesundsfjorden, Frierfjorden, and Eidangerfjorden.

== See also ==
- List of Norwegian fjords
