= Stathelle =

Town in Telemark county, Norway

- Town/City
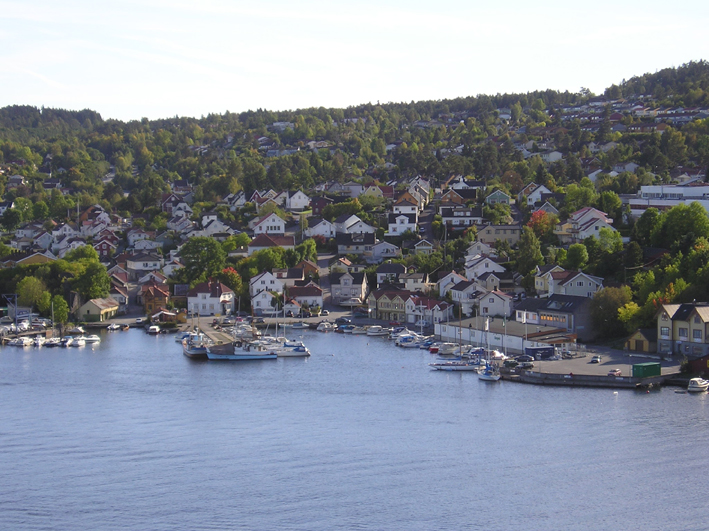
- View of the town
- Interactive map of Stathelle
- Coordinates: 59.04511°N 9.69821°E
- Country: Norway
- Region: Eastern Norway
- County: Telemark
- District: Grenland
- Municipality: Bamble Municipality
- Established as
- Ladested: 1774–1963
- Town (By): 1997
- Elevation: 4 m (13 ft)
- Time zone: UTC+01:00 (CET)
  - Summer (DST): UTC+02:00 (CEST)
- Post Code: 3960 Stathelle
- Former municipality
- Stathelle ladested
- Telemark within Norway

- Stathelle within Telemark
- Country: Norway
- County: Telemark
- District: Grenland
- Established: 21 Dec 1851
  - Preceded by: Bamble Municipality
- Disestablished: 1 Jan 1964
  - Succeeded by: Bamble Municipality
- Administrative centre: Stathelle

Government
  - Mayor (1962–1963): Arnodd Aronsen (V)

Area (upon dissolution)
  - Total: 0.3 km^{2} (0.12 sq mi)
  - Rank: #687 in Norway

Population (1963)
  - Total: 725
  - Rank: #651 in Norway
  - Density: 2,416.7/km^{2} (6,259/sq mi)
  - Change (10 years): ▼ −4.4%

Official language
  - Norwegian form: Neutral
- Time zone: UTC+01:00 (CET)
  - Summer (DST): UTC+02:00 (CEST)
- ISO 3166 code: NO-0803

Stathelle (Norwegian pronunciation: [stat²hɛlːə]) is a town in Bamble Municipality in Telemark county, Norway. The town is located at the confluence of the Frierfjorden, Eidangerfjord, and Langesundsfjorden. The town of Brevik lies about 1 kilometre (0.62 mi) across the fjord and the town of Langesund lies about 4 kilometres (2.5 mi) to the southeast. Stathelle Church is located in the town.

For a long time, Stathelle and the neighboring town of Langesund have been grouped together as part of the Porsgrunn/Skien metropolitan area and because of this, the population and area data for this town has not been separately tracked by Statistics Norway. What is tracked, is the portion of the metropolitan area located in Bamble Municipality. In 2025, the Langesund/Stathelle area in Bamble Municipality measured 6.35 square kilometres (1,570 acres) and together they had a population of 10,563.

== Government ==
In Norway, municipalities are the unit of local government. This means that cities and towns are simply designations for urban areas, but under current Norwegian law, they have no actual government authority. The town of Stathelle lies within Bamble Municipality and is therefore governed by the municipal council of Bamble Municipality.

== History ==
Stathelle is an old trading town and it was granted limited ladested rights (port town status) on 22 February 1774. In the middle of the 1800s, Stathelle was an enterprising seaport, characterized by the trading house established by Albert Blehr on Kjellestad, which was one of the nation's largest timber exporters. (Today there is a marina and a park in the same area.)

Brevik bridge was constructed during 1962. Previously travelers along the southern highway between Oslo and Stavanger had to take the ferry between the towns of Brevik and Stathelle.

Hansen & Arntzen Co AS is a traditional shipyard in Stathelle that specializes in the restoration of vessels. Hansen & Arntzen AS Ekstrand Co. was established in 1929 as a family business. The company is known for its significant repair and restoration projects. Many famous ships have been restored there, including the Norwegian Royal Yacht HNoMY Norge.

=== Name ===
The town is named Stathelle. The first element comes from the word staðr which means "place" or "town". The last element is hella which means "flagstone" or "slab of rock".

=== Administrative history ===
The formannskapsdistrikt law of 1837 created a system of local government in Norway by establishing each town or city (ladested or kjøpstad) and each Church of Norway prestegjeld as a civil municipality. On 1 January 1838, the ladested of Stathelle was designated as part of Bamble Municipality since Stathelle did not have full ladested rights. On 21 December 1851, Stathelle was granted full rights as a ladested, which removed it from Bamble Municipality and created it as a municipality of its own.

During the 1960s, there were many municipal mergers across Norway due to the work of the Schei Committee. On 1 January 1964, Stathelle Municipality was dissolved and the following areas were merged to form an enlarged Bamble Municipality:

- all of Stathelle Municipality (population: 724)
- all of Langesund Municipality (population: 2,281)
- all of Bamble Municipality (population: 5,237)

=== Municipal self-government (1851-1964) ===
While it existed, Stathelle Municipality was responsible for primary education (through 10th grade), outpatient health services, senior citizen services, welfare and other social services, zoning, economic development, and municipal roads and utilities. The municipality was governed by a municipal council of directly elected representatives. The mayor was indirectly elected by a vote of the municipal council. The municipality was under the jurisdiction of the Bamble District Court and the Agder Court of Appeal.

==== Mayors ====
The mayor (Norwegian: ordfører) of Stathelle Municipality was the political leader of the municipality and the chairperson of the municipal council. The following people have held this position:

- 1851–1859: Albert Blehr
- 1860–1862: Jacob Knudsen
- 1863–1863: Thomas Møller Blehr
- 1864–1866: John Petter Johnsen
- 1867–1869: Iver Abrahamsen
- 1870–1870: Peder Pedersen
- 1871–1871: John Petter Johnsen
- 1872–1872: Iver Abrahamsen
- 1873–1874: Nicolay Nilsen
- 1875–1876: J.A. Larsen
- 1877–1879: Nicolay Nilsen
- 1880–1880: A.C. Andersen
- 1881–1881: Nicolay Nilsen
- 1882–1883: A.C. Andersen
- 1884–1886: Søren O. Høen
- 1887–1887: Hans Andreas Grønli
- 1888–1888: Søren O. Høen
- 1889–1889: Hans Andreas Grønli
- 1890–1893: Fredrik Paus
- 1894–1896: Rasmus Rasmussen
- 1897–1897: Fredrik Paus
- 1898–1898: Rasmus Rasmussen
- 1899–1899: Fredrik Paus
- 1900–1900: Oluf M. Berg
- 1901–1903: Fredrik Paus
- 1904–1904: Nicolai P. Berg
- 1905–1905: Fredrik Paus
- 1906–1907: Torjus Christoffersen
- 1908–1909: Lars Olsen Vegheim
- 1910–1914: Torjus Christoffersen
- 1915–1915: Fredrik Paus
- 1916–1916: Torjus Christoffersen
- 1917–1917: Julius F. Nilsen
- 1918–1919: Johan Kristensen
- 1920–1921: Hans Østvedt
- 1922–1922: Johan Kristensen
- 1923–1923: Zakarias Evensen
- 1924–1924: Jonas Fjeld
- 1925–1925: Nils Larsen
- 1926–1928: Johannes Mykelbust (V)
- 1929–1929: Samuel Olsen
- 1930–1940: Johannes Mykelbust (V)
- 1941–1941: Axel Faarlund (NS)
- 1942–1943: Ludvig Kraft-Lund (NS)
- 1943–1944: Jens Oliver Bjørnsen (NS)
- 1945–1945: Johannes Mykelbust (V)
- 1945–1946: Aage Tangvold (Ap)
- 1946–1947: Paul Solgård (Ap)
- 1947–1948: Eilert Eilertsen (Ap)
- 1949–1957: Johannes Myklebust (V)
- 1958–1961: Aksel Martini (Ap)
- 1962–1963: Arnodd Aronsen (V)

==== Municipal council ====
The municipal council (Bystyre) of Stathelle was made up of 17 representatives that were elected to four year terms. The tables below show the historical composition of the council by political party.

Stathelle bystyre 1959–1963
Party name (in Norwegian)	Number of representatives
Labour Party (Arbeiderpartiet)	8
Conservative Party (Høyre)	3
Christian Democratic Party (Kristelig Folkeparti)	1
Liberal Party (Venstre)	5
Total number of members:	17
Note: On 1 January 1964, Stathelle Municipality became part of Bamble Municipality.

Stathelle bystyre 1955–1959
Party name (in Norwegian)	Number of representatives
Labour Party (Arbeiderpartiet)	8
Conservative Party (Høyre)	2
Christian Democratic Party (Kristelig Folkeparti)	1
Liberal Party (Venstre)	6
Total number of members:	17

Stathelle bystyre 1951–1955
Party name (in Norwegian)	Number of representatives
Labour Party (Arbeiderpartiet)	8
Conservative Party (Høyre)	2
Christian Democratic Party (Kristelig Folkeparti)	1
Liberal Party (Venstre)	9
Total number of members:	20

Stathelle bystyre 1947–1951
Party name (in Norwegian)	Number of representatives
Labour Party (Arbeiderpartiet)	8
Conservative Party (Høyre)	3
Christian Democratic Party (Kristelig Folkeparti)	2
Liberal Party (Venstre)	7
Total number of members:	20

Stathelle bystyre 1945–1947
Party name (in Norwegian)	Number of representatives
Labour Party (Arbeiderpartiet)	10
Conservative Party (Høyre)	4
Christian Democratic Party (Kristelig Folkeparti)	3
Liberal Party (Venstre)	3
Total number of members:	20

Stathelle bystyre 1937–1941*
Party name (in Norwegian)	Number of representatives
Labour Party (Arbeiderpartiet)	5
Liberal Party (Venstre)	7
Joint list of the Conservative Party (Høyre) and the Free-minded People's Party (Frisinnede Folkeparti)	8
Total number of members:	20
Note: Due to the German occupation of Norway during World War II, no elections were held for new municipal councils until after the war ended in 1945.

Stathelle bystyre 1935–1937
Party name (in Norwegian)	Number of representatives
Labour Party (Arbeiderpartiet)	6
Liberal Party (Venstre)	6
Joint list of the Conservative Party (Høyre) and the Free-minded People's Party (Frisinnede Folkeparti)	8
Total number of members:	20

== Media gallery ==
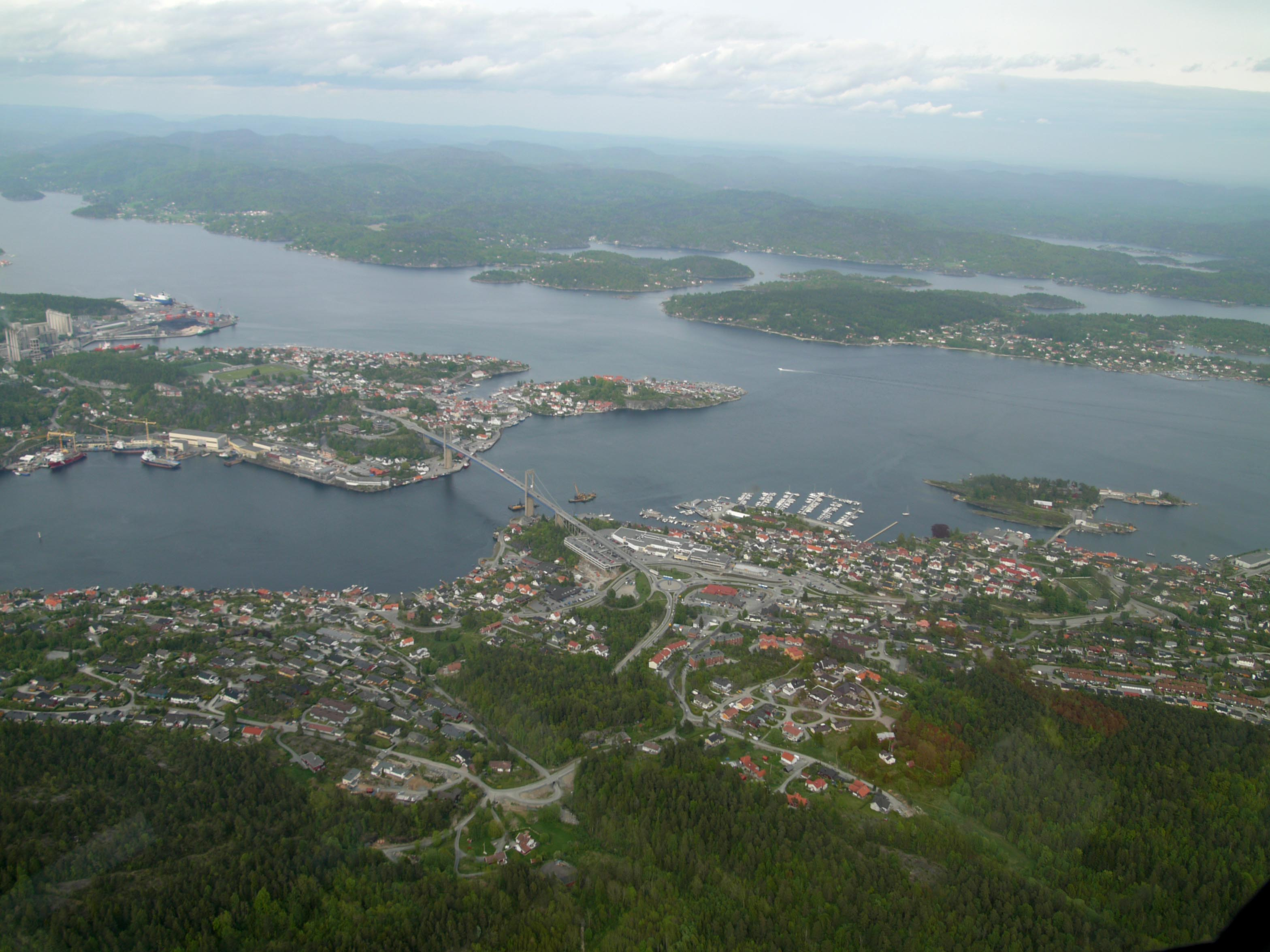
Stathelle in the foreground

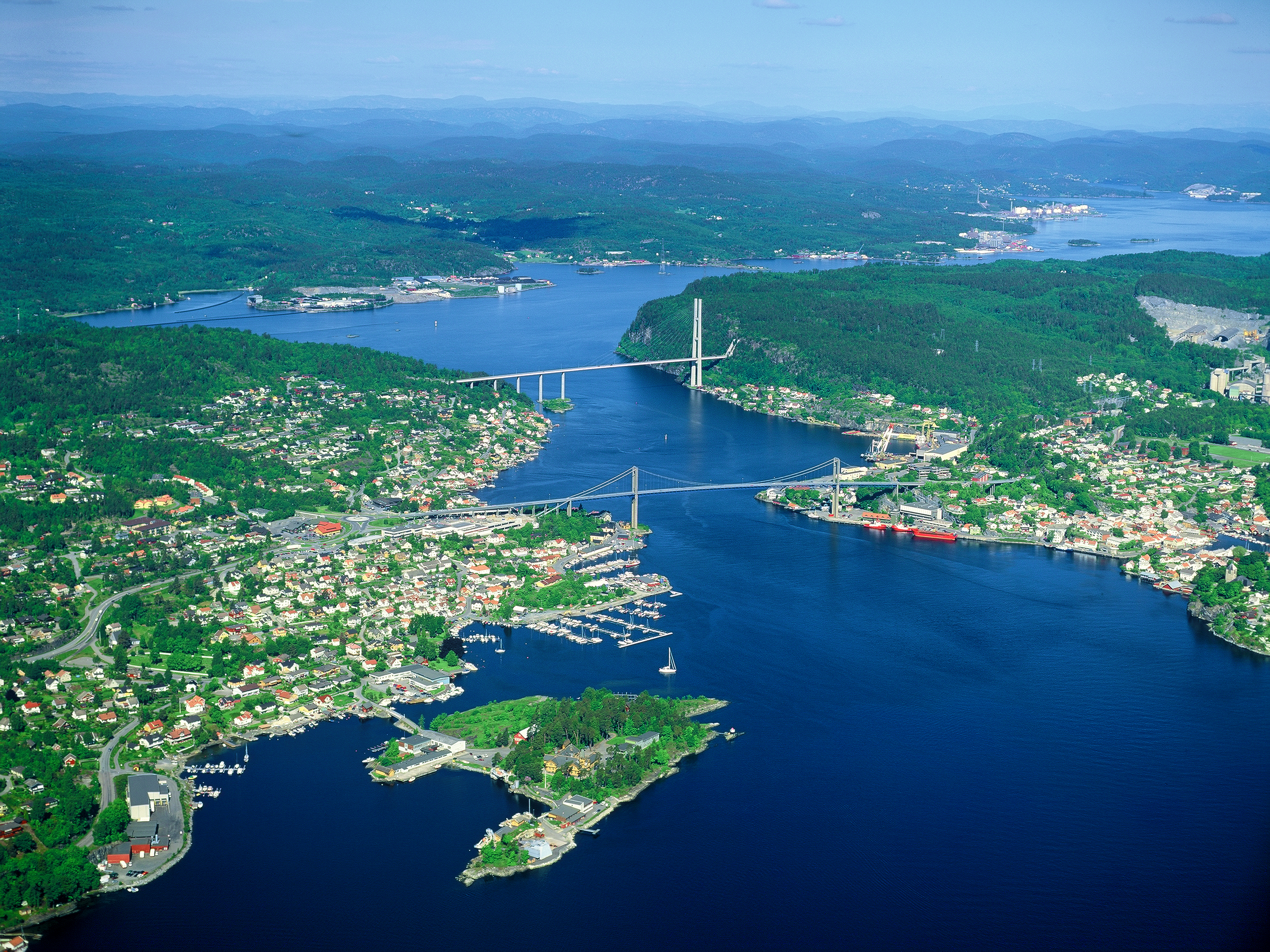
Stathelle on the left

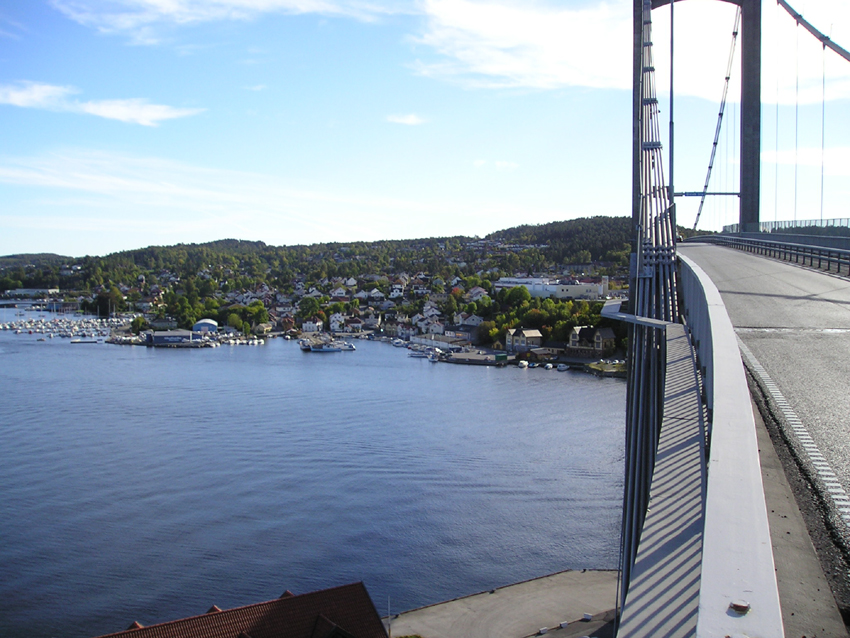
Crossing the bridge into Stathelle

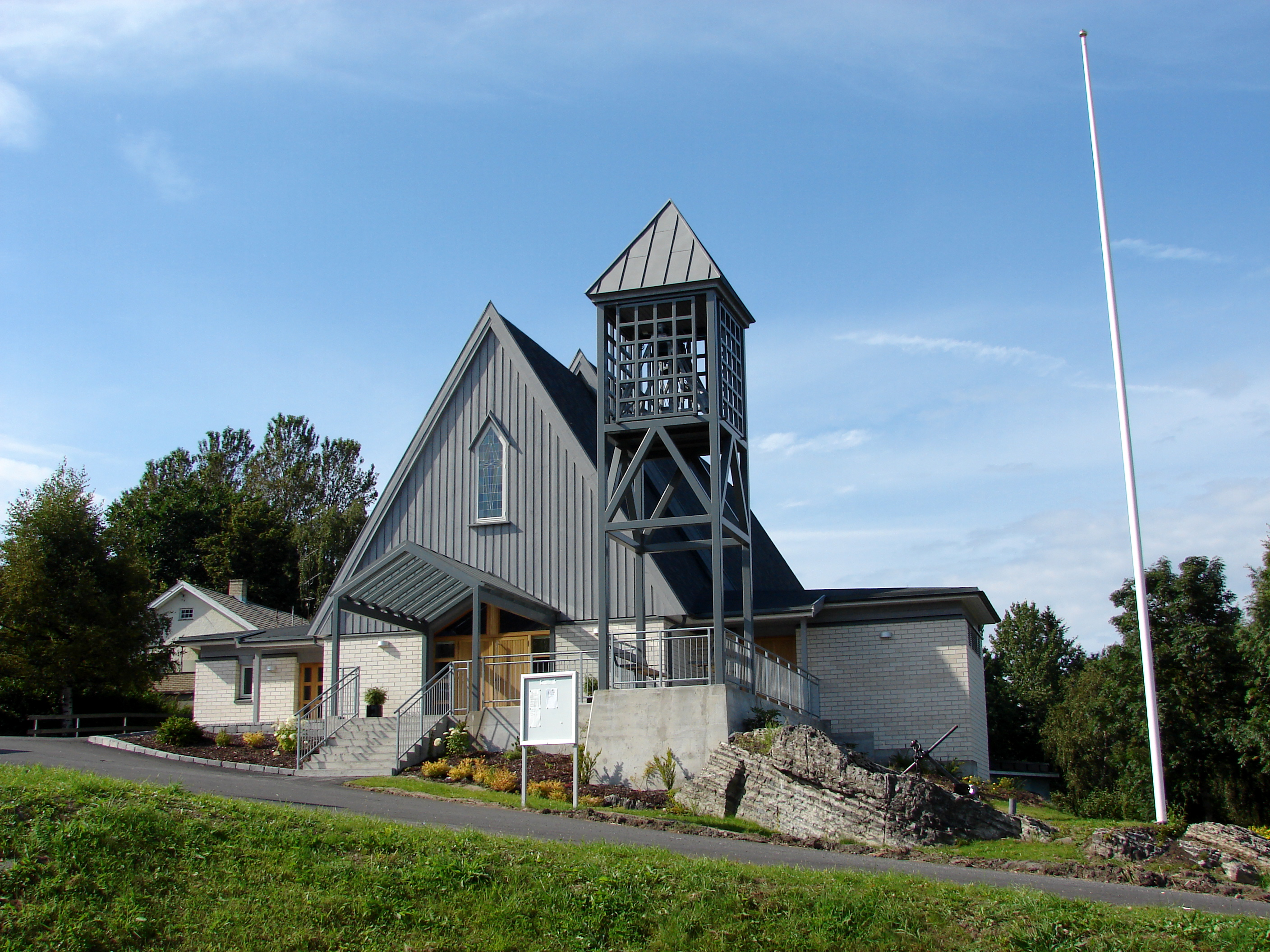
Stathelle Church

== Notable people ==
- Knud Karl Krogh-Tonning (1842–1911), a Norwegian theologian who was born in Stathelle
- Turid Thomassen (born 1965), a politician
- Ella Gjømle Berg (born 1979), a cross country skier

== See also ==
- Stathel and staddle stones
- List of towns and cities in Norway
- List of former municipalities of Norway
