= Bamble =

Bamble may refer to:

== People ==
- Javji Bamble, a Koli Mansabdar of Rajur in the Maratha Empire

== Places ==
- Bamble Municipality, a municipality in Telemark county, Norway
- Bamble (village), a village within Bamble Municipality in Telemark county, Norway
- Bamble Church, a church in Bamble Municipality in Telemark county, Norway
- Bamble prestegjeld, a former geographic subdivision of the Church of Norway in Telemark county, Norway
- Bamble prosti, a deanery of the Church of Norway in Telemark county, Norway

== Other ==
- Bamble Terrane, a segment of an orogenic belt in Telemark county, Norway
- Bamble Cellulosefabrikk, a former pulp mill in Telemark county, Norway
