= St. Olav's Church (ruin) =

Church ruins in Telemark, Norway

Skeidi Church / St. Olav's Church
- Skeidi kirke / Olavskirken
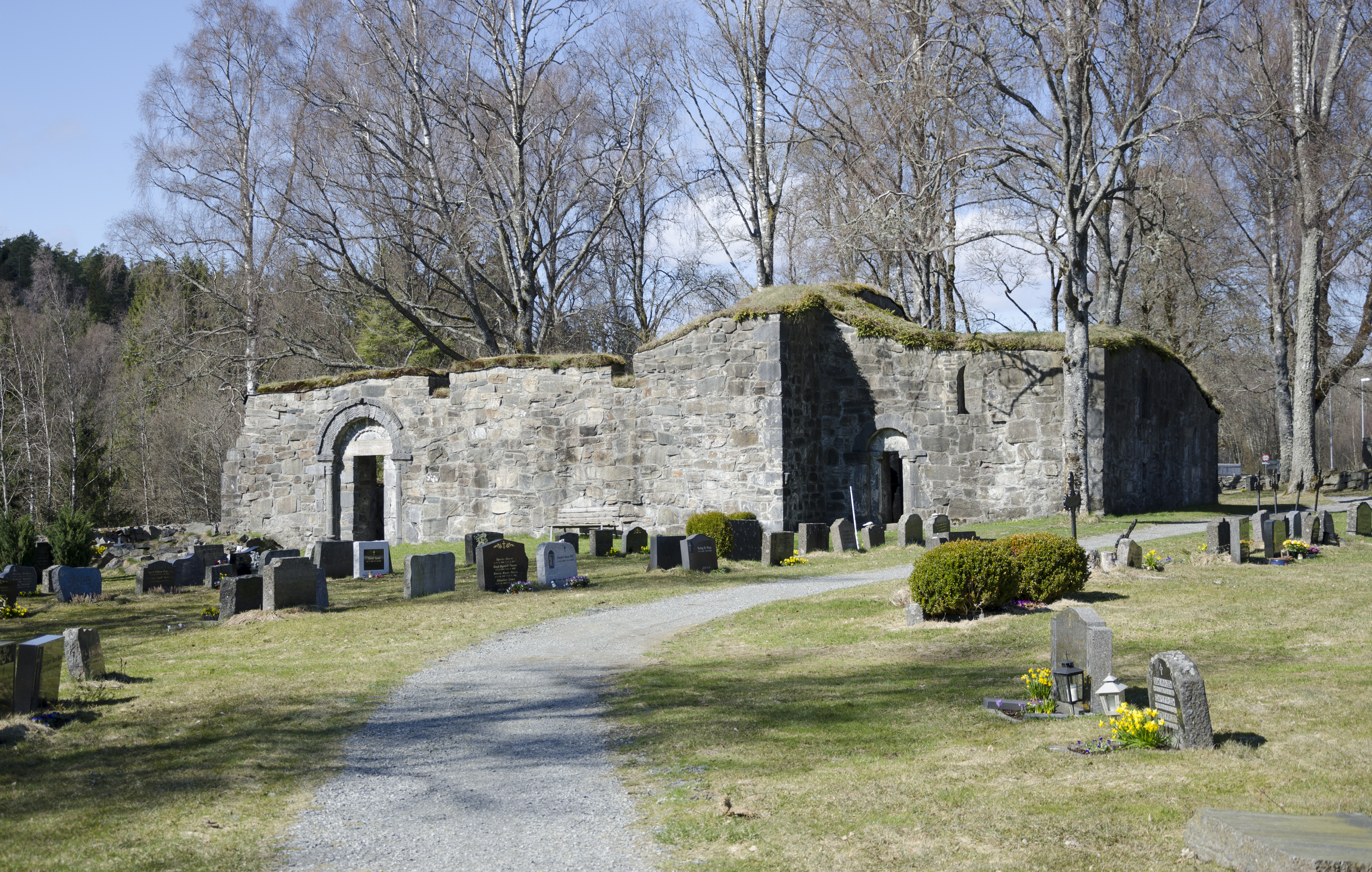
- View of the ruin of Skeidi church, a medieval church dedicated to St. Olav, inaugurated ca. 1150
- Skeidi Church / St. Olav's Church
- 59°00′29″N 9°39′47″E
- Location: Bamble Municipality, Telemark
- Country: Norway
- Denomination: Church of Norway
- Previous denomination: Catholic Church
- Churchmanship: Evangelical Lutheran

History
- Status: Parish church
- Founded: 12th century
- Consecrated: 4 October (year unknown)

Architecture
- Functional status: Ruins
- Architectural type: Long church
- Completed: c. 1150 (876 years ago)
- Closed: 1845

Specifications
- Materials: Stone

Administration
- Diocese: Agder og Telemark
- Deanery: Bamble prosti
- Parish: Bamble
- Norwegian Cultural Heritage Site
- Type: Church
- Status: Automatically protected
- ID: 52378

St. Olav's Church or Skeidi Church (Norwegian: Olavskirken or Skeidi kirke) is a partly restored ruins of a parish church of the Church of Norway in Bamble Municipality in Telemark county, Norway. It is located in the village of Bamble. It was the church for the Skeidi parish which was part of the Bamble prosti (deanery) in the Diocese of Agder og Telemark. The stone church was built in a long church design around the year 1150 using plans drawn up by an unknown architect.

The church ruins are located by the European route E18 highway, about 150 metres (490 ft) to the south of the newer Bamble Church which was completed in 1845. Bamble Church was constructed in part with stone from the ruins.

== History ==
Skeidi Church was built of stone sometime before 1150 in Romanesque-Norman style inspired by English Norman architecture. It was dedicated to St. Olaf, the patron saint of Norway, so it was also known as St. Olav's Church. The church served as a center for the veneration of St. Olaf by the nearby Gimsøy Abbey. It has a rectangular nave measuring about 12.8 by 9 metres (42 ft × 30 ft) and narrower, rectangular chancel measuring about 5.2 by 4.1 metres (17 ft × 13 ft) with a medieval stone sacristy built on the north side of the chancel. There is some uncertainty about the end of the church to the west, so it is possible that the nave extended further than the visible end of today and that it had a west tower. In that case, it would have been the largest stone church in Telemark during that period. It had a number of unusual building features, including a chancel screen (lektorium). The church was consecrated on 4 October, but the year is unknown.

Until 1738, the Skeidi parish comprised Sannidal, Skåtøy, Kragerø, and Bamble. The church was the main church within the district of Grenland and therefore had the highest status of all churches in the area.

In 1814, this church served as an election church (Norwegian: valgkirke). Together with more than 300 other parish churches across Norway, it was a polling station for elections to the 1814 Norwegian Constituent Assembly which wrote the Constitution of Norway. This was Norway's first national elections. Each church parish was a constituency that elected people called "electors" who later met together in each county to elect the representatives for the assembly that was to meet at Eidsvoll Manor later that year.

By 1840, the parish needed a new church and it was decided to close the old church and build a new one on a site about 150 metres (490 ft) to the north. A lot of the stone from the old church was used to build the foundation for the new church. The new Bamble Church was completed in 1845. Afterwards, the remains of the old church was left to continue to fall into ruins. Only parts of some walls remained, mostly on the south side. In the 1950s, there were plans to rebuild the entire church, but they never came to fruition. During the 1980s, an effort to restore and rebuild the small chapel in the ruins was carried out. The separate small room, which today is called Maria's Chapel (Mariakapellet), was consecrated by the Bishop Halvor Bergan on 29 July 1988. There is a regular Olsok service each year in the chapel, along with some weddings and baptisms. Since 1998, the chapel has been heated, lighted, and open to the public all year round.

== Media gallery ==
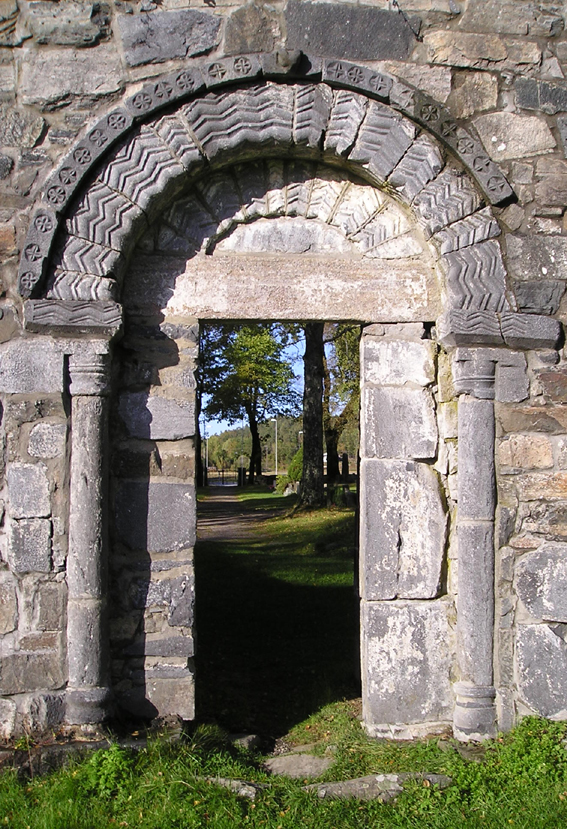
St. Olav's Church ruins main portal, with double chevron arch and columns

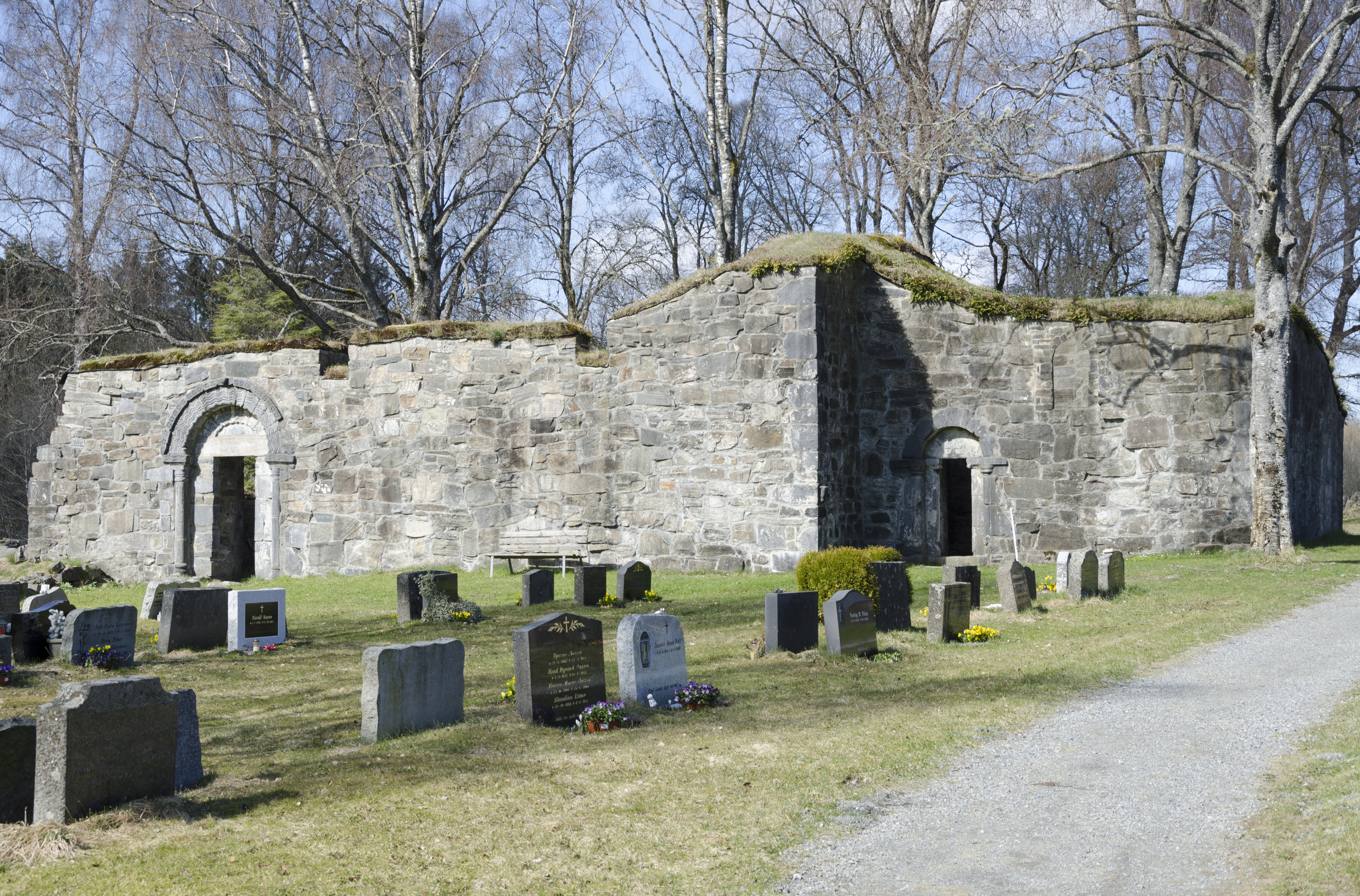
St. Olav's Church cemetery

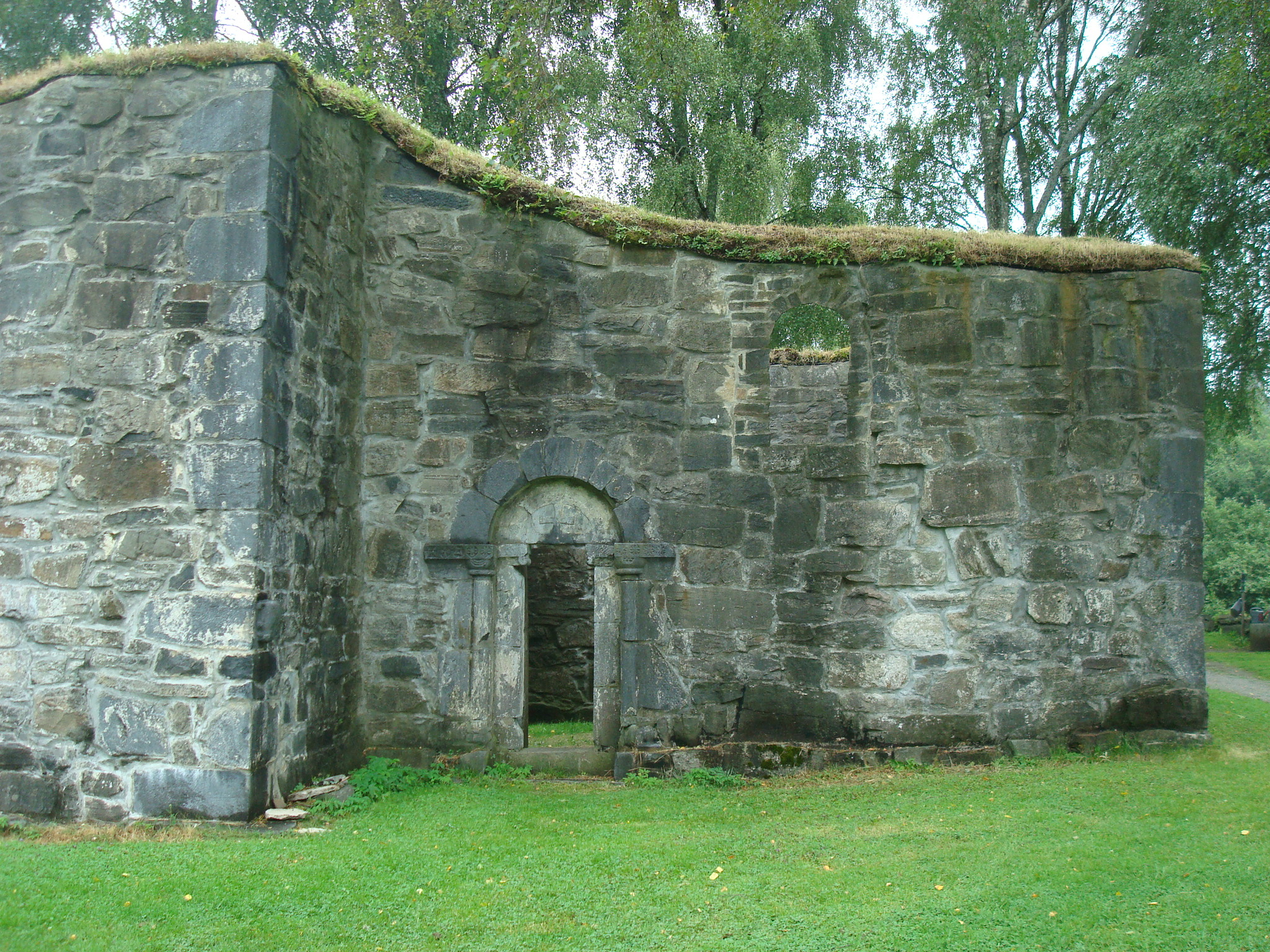
Outer wall at St. Olav's Church ruins

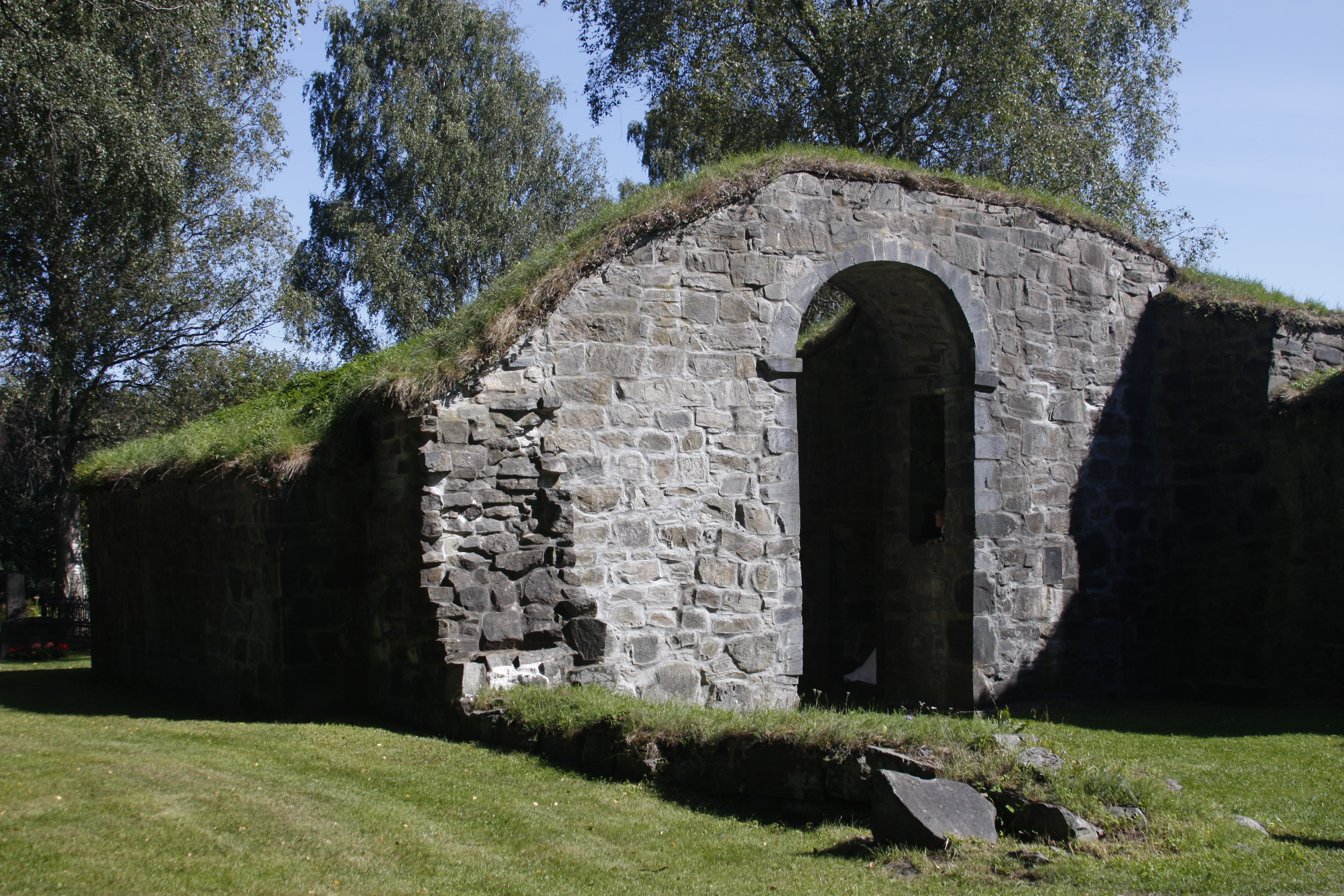
St. Olav's Church ruins

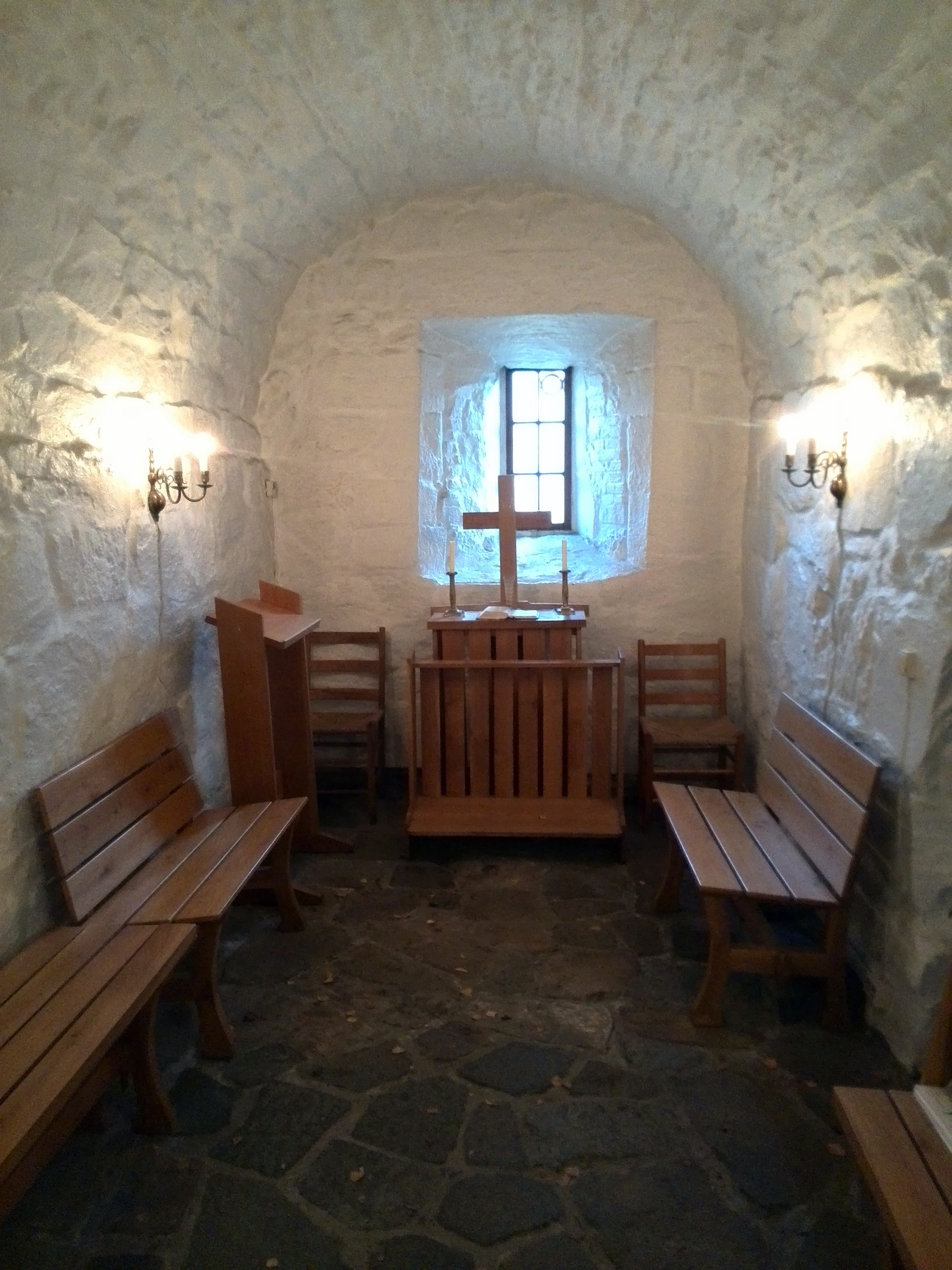
Maria Chapel in St. Olav's Church ruins

== See also ==
- List of churches in Agder og Telemark
