= Valle, Telemark =

Village in Bamble Municipality, Norway

Valle
- Village
- Interactive map of Valle
- Coordinates: 58.93403°N 9.55247°E
- Country: Norway
- Region: Eastern Norway
- County: Telemark
- District: Grenland
- Municipality: Bamble Municipality
- Elevation: 10 m (33 ft)
- Time zone: UTC+01:00 (CET)
  - Summer (DST): UTC+02:00 (CEST)
- Post Code: 3967 Stathelle

Valle is a village in Bamble Municipality in Telemark county, Norway. The village is located on the coast of the Skagerrak, near the mouth of the Fossingfjorden, in the southern part of the municipality. The village is located about 5 kilometres (3.1 mi) to the south of the village of Botten and about 10 kilometres (6.2 mi) to the southwest of the village of Bamble.
