= Herre Church =

Church in Telemark, Norway

- Herre kirke
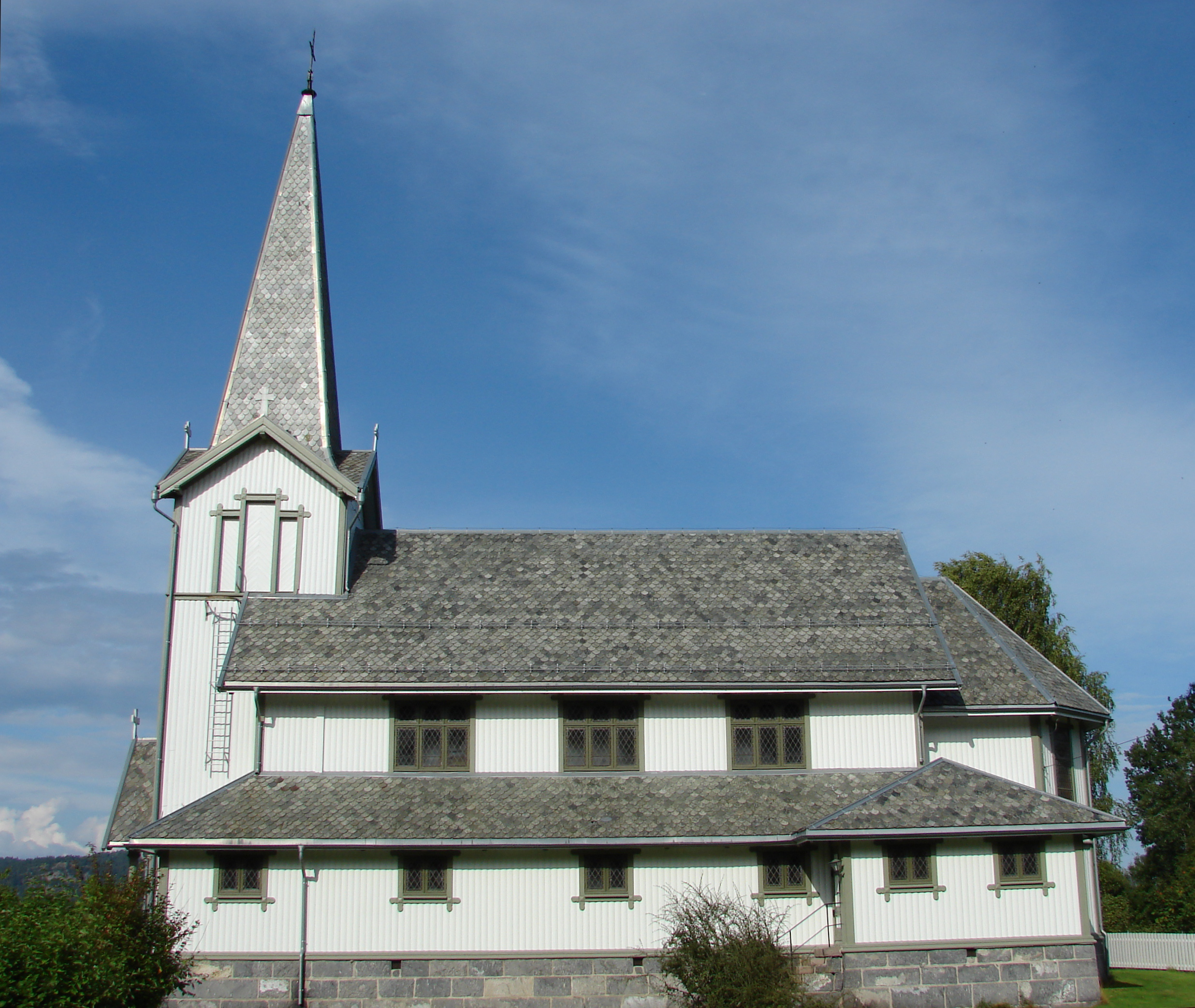
- View of the church
- Herre Church
- 59°06′11″N 9°33′45″E
- Location: Bamble Municipality, Telemark
- Country: Norway
- Denomination: Church of Norway
- Previous denomination: Catholic Church
- Churchmanship: Evangelical Lutheran
- Website: bamble.kirken.no

History
- Status: Parish church
- Founded: 1905
- Consecrated: 1 November 1905
- Events: 1928: Electrification; 1955: Restoration; 1963: New organ 2003: External restoration

Architecture
- Functional status: Active
- Heritage designation: Protected
- Designated: 6 February 2002
- Architect: Haldor Larsen Børve
- Architectural type: Long church
- Completed: 1905 (121 years ago)
- Construction cost: 24,000 kr

Specifications
- Capacity: 275
- Materials: Wood

Administration
- Diocese: Agder og Telemark
- Deanery: Bamble prosti
- Parish: Bamble og Herre
- Norwegian Cultural Heritage Site
- Type: Church
- Status: Listed
- ID: 84561

Herre Church (Norwegian: Herre kirke) is a parish church of the Church of Norway in Bamble Municipality in Telemark county, Norway. It is located in the village of Herre. It is one of the churches for the Bamble og Herre parish which is part of the Bamble prosti (deanery) in the Diocese of Agder og Telemark. The white, wooden church was built in a long church design in 1905 using plans drawn up by the architect Haldor Larsen Børve. The church seats about 275 people.

== History ==
In the latter half of the 19th century, local residents of Herre began working towards getting an annex chapel built in their village, rather than having to travel to Bamble Church. After a factory opened and attracted more residents to Herre, the desire for a local chapel became possible. The factory provided land for a cemetery and chapel. The cemetery was consecrated on 2 January 1898. Work next moved to the construction of the new chapel building. The chapel was designed by Haldor Larsen Børve and O. Thovsen was the lead builder with Tollef Veholt being responsible for the masonry work. The new chapel (called Herre Chapel at that time) was consecrated on 1 November 1905. The new building was a wooden long church that was designed using the inspiration of a medieval stave church. The building measures 23.8 by 13 metres (78 ft × 43 ft) and the total cost for its construction was 23,709.15 kr. The financing of the costs were as follows: 16,109.15 kr was given as a gift from the factory, 1,200 kr as a gift from a parishioner, and 3,000 kr as an interest-free loan from the Bamble savings bank. An additional 3,400 kr was collected from the people of the village. Initially, the building was titled as a "chapel", but in 1997, the church was upgraded to the status of a parish church and re-titled Herre Church.

== Media gallery ==
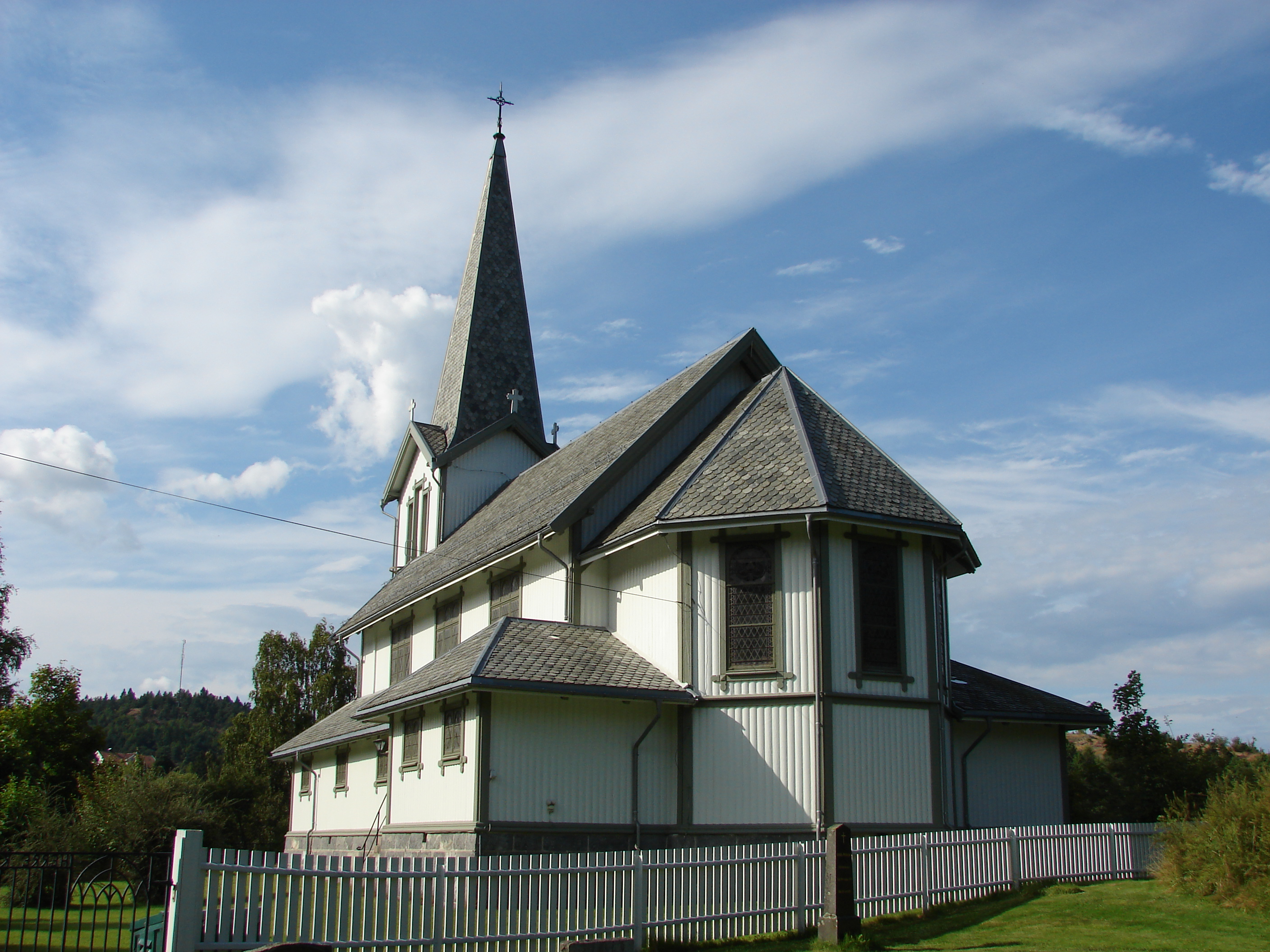

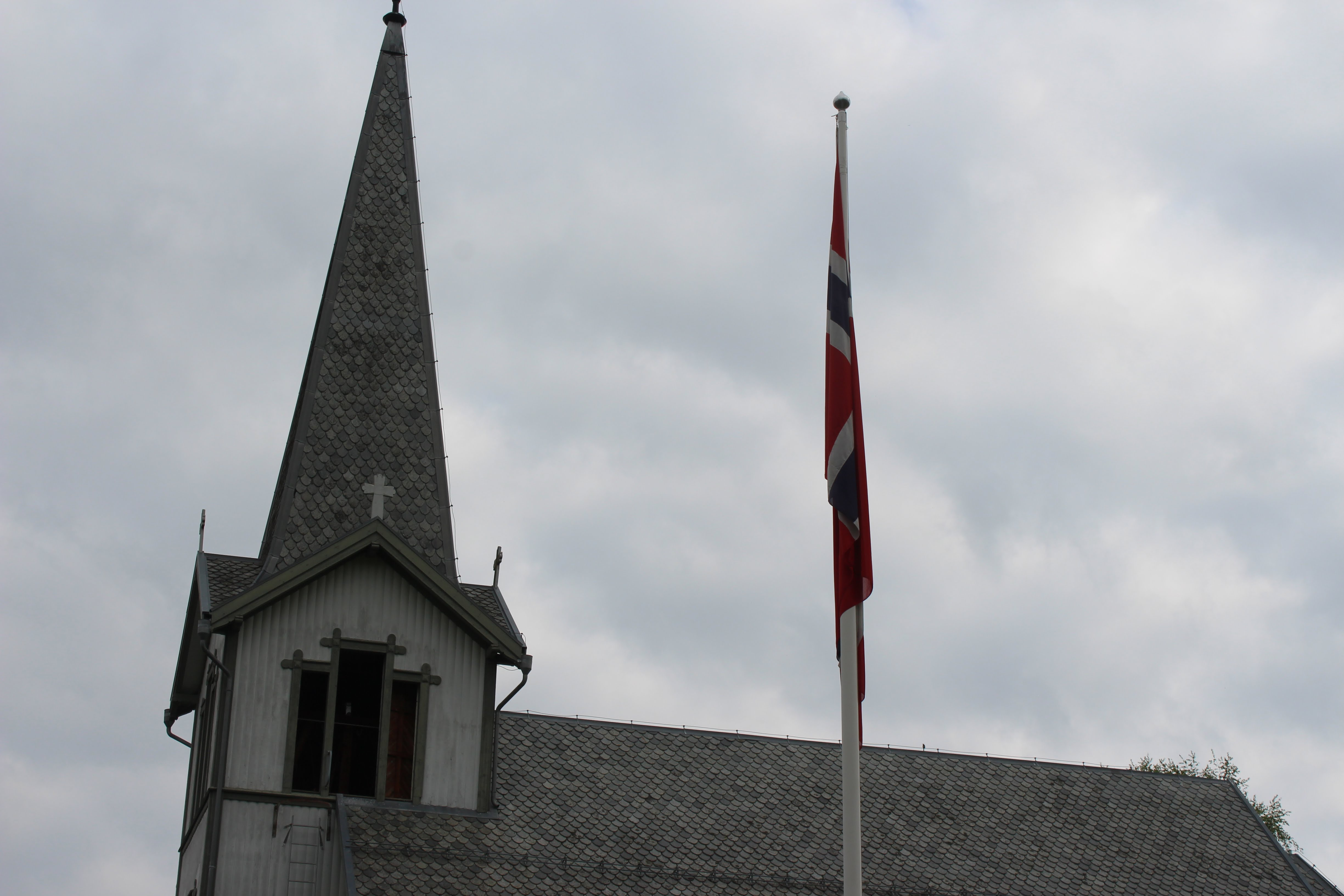

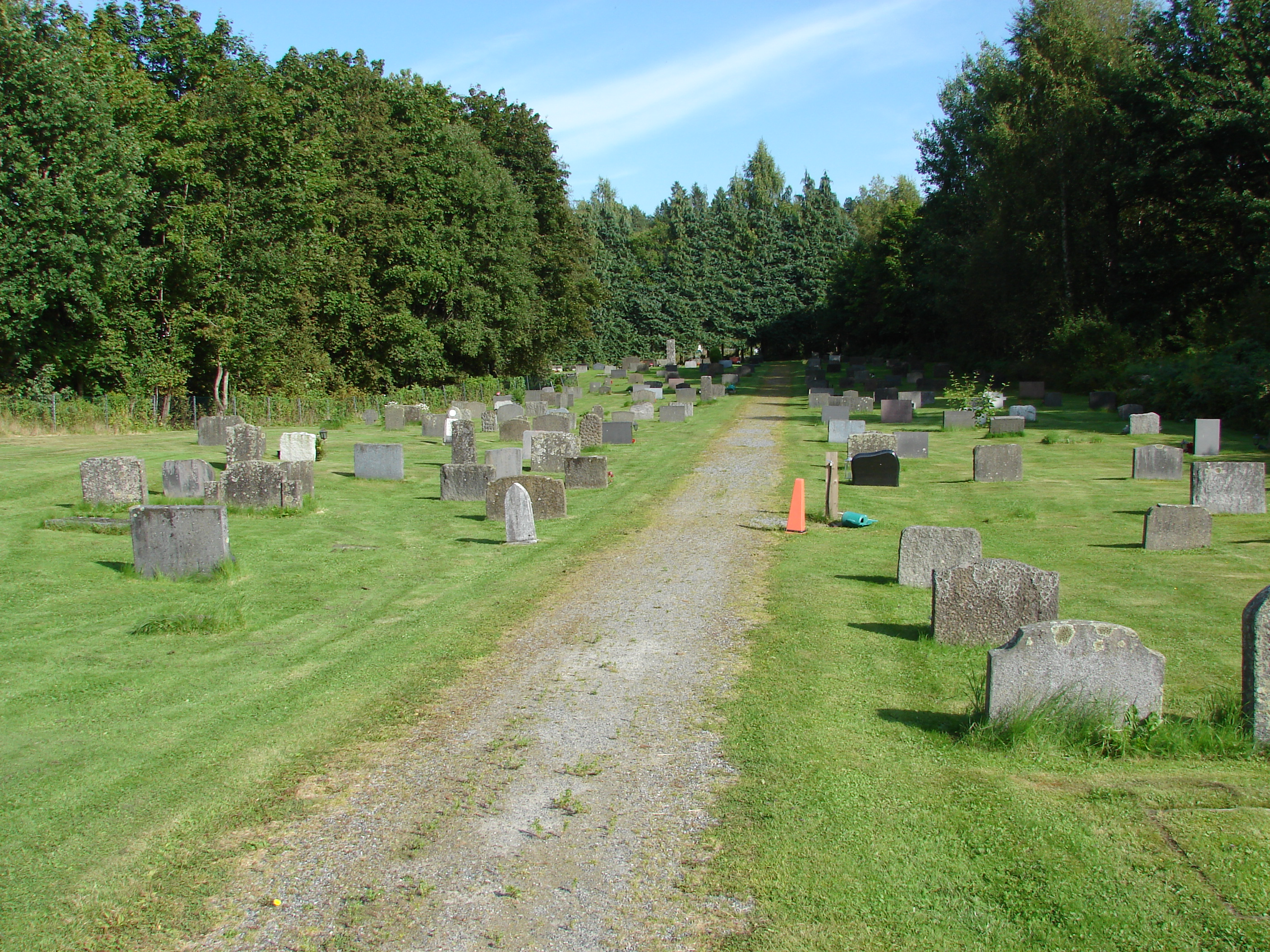

== See also ==
- List of churches in Agder og Telemark
