= Botten, Telemark =

Village in Bamble Municipality, Norway

Botten
- Village
- Interactive map of Botten
- Coordinates: 58.97136°N 9.56247°E
- Country: Norway
- Region: Eastern Norway
- County: Telemark
- District: Grenland
- Municipality: Bamble Municipality

Area
  - Total: 0.34 km^{2} (0.13 sq mi)
- Elevation: 61 m (200 ft)

Population (2025)
  - Total: 270
  - Density: 794/km^{2} (2,060/sq mi)
- Time zone: UTC+01:00 (CET)
  - Summer (DST): UTC+02:00 (CEST)
- Post Code: 3967 Stathelle

Botten is a village in Bamble Municipality in Telemark county, Norway. The village is located about 5 kilometres (3.1 mi) to the north of the village of Valle, about 8 kilometres (5.0 mi) southwest of the village of Bamble, and about 2 kilometres (1.2 mi) to the south of the European route E18 highway. The village is mainly a residential area.

The 0.34-square-kilometre (84-acre) village has a population (2025) of 270 and a population density of 794 inhabitants per square kilometre (2,060/sq mi).
