= Henrik Christian Fredrik Størmer =

Norwegian engineer, inventor, industrialist and entrepreneur (1839–1900)

Henrik Christian Fredrik Størmer (19 August 1839 – 29 December 1900) was a Norwegian engineer, inventor, industrialist and entrepreneur.

== Personal life ==
Fredrik Størmer was born in Trondhjem, the son of businessman Henrik Christian Fredrik Størmer Sr. (1809–62) and his wife Dorothea Margrethe Heldahl (1813–85). Through his younger brother Georg Ludvig Størmer (1842–1930), Størmer was the uncle of Carl Størmer (1874–1957), a mathematician, and grand-uncle of Leif Størmer, a geologist. He had no children himself.

== Career ==
Upon finishing his secondary education in Trondhjem, Størmer travelled to Karlsruhe, Germany to study at the Karlsruhe Institute of Technology. From 1860 to 1862, he was employed as a supervisor at Myrens Verksted in Christiania. In the late 1860s, Størmer established two drying oil factories in Hemne Municipality and Tingvoll Municipality. These factories were both closed after a few years, when drying oil was replaced by paraffin in Norway. In 1868, Størmer established a factory in Tistedalen, which produced charcoal briquettes. He had earlier patented a production method that used sawdust to produce charcoal.

In the 1890s, Størmer acquired the rights to 17 waterfalls in Norway, which he had planned to produce electricity with. In 1893–94, a commission that included Størmer was put together by the Norwegian Engineer and Architect Association; it proposed a law for the Parliament that would enforce abandonment of necessary property to construct power lines. The law was passed in 1894, and Størmer did therefore have to sell some of his waterfalls.

At the end of the 1870s, Størmer travelled to France, and constructed a charcoal factory in Suresnes. In 1878, Størmer was appointed official reporter of Norway at the Exposition Universelle in Paris. In his exposition report, Størmer recommended construction of cellulose factories in Norway. On his return to Norway in the late 1880s, Størmer initiated construction of cellulose factories in Moss, Ranheim and Bamble. He died on 29 December 1900 after being run over by a tram.

== Public debate ==
Størmer was a proponent of the standard gauge in railways, and wrote articles and gave speeches in which he described the advantages of the normal gauge and the disadvantages of the 3 ft 6 in (1,067 mm) gauge. The narrow gauge railway proponents Cato Guldberg and Carl Abraham Pihl filed a defamation against him, which they won. However, Størmer appealed, and was acquitted in 1888.

Even though Størmer himself wrote Bokmål, he sided with Ivar Aasen and Noregs Mållag in the Norwegian language conflict. In his testament, Størmer attested his remaining waterfalls and patents to the Nynorsk book publishing house Det Norske Samlaget.
