= Mission Covenant Church of Norway =

Norwegian Christian denonmination

- Misjonskirken Norge
- Founder: Fredrik Franson and Gustav Adolph Lammers
- Location: Norway
- Members: 11,087 (2019)
- Official language: Norwegian
- Website: https://mknu.no

The Mission Covenant Church of Norway (Norwegian: Misjonskirken Norge, formerly Det Norske Misjonsforbund, DNM) is an assembly of dissident or free Christian churches founded in 1884 through the encouragement of the Swedish-American evangelist Fredrik Franson. Gustav Adolph Lammers, the role model for Ibsen's Brand, is perceived as the spiritual father of the Mission Covenant Church of Norway. Today it comprises ninety-nine independent churches scattered all over Norway.

The Mission Covenant Church of Norway is registered as a separate denomination, but each individual with the association has the freedom to practice the beliefs of their respective Norwegian Church groups. Each member is also free to practice their own forms of Holy Communion and baptism (infant baptism vs. adult baptism).

Its churches' work involves church services, Sunday schools, scout, and youth associations. The Mission Covenant Church of Norway predominantly emphasizes evangelism and missionary work. The Mission Covenant Church of Norway has about eight-thousand two hundred registered members – in addition to those who have chosen to remain as members of the Church of Norway.

Stagedive is a camp organized by the church each year and held all over Norway for youths between twelve and sixteen years.

== Henrik Ibsen's Brand ==
The first dissident congregation in Norway was established by the priest in Skien, Gustav Adolph Lammers, who resigned from his post in the Church of Norway. Lammers is perceived as a role model for the character Brand in the play of the same name. Ibsen's mother and especially his sister, Hedvig, were ardent followers of Lammers. The Mission Covenant Church in Skien is seen as the direct offspring of this dissident congregation.

== Overseas missions ==
In Hong Kong and Macau, the church is known by its Chinese name: Jīdūjiào Shèngyuē Jàohuì (基督教聖約教會).
