= Bamble Cellulosefabrikk =

Pulp mill in Norway

Bamble Cellulosefabrikk was a pulp mill in the village of Herre in Bamble Municipality, Norway.

It was established in 1888. Cellulose expert Henrik Christian Fredrik Størmer was behind the construction. It changed its name to Herre Fabrikker in 1946, was bought by Follum Fabrikker in 1962 and closed down in 1978.
