= Gustav Adolph Lammers =

Norwegian priest and politician (1802–1878)

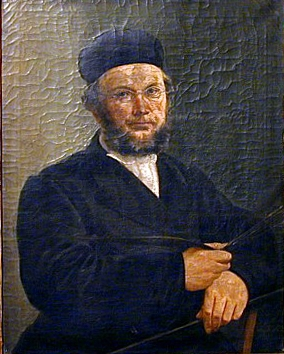
Self-portrait

Gustav Adolph Lammers (26 May 1802 – 2 May 1878) was a Norwegian priest, architect, artist and member of parliament. He founded the country's first dissenter congregation, the first church to officially break away from the Church of Norway.

== Biography ==
Lammers was born in Copenhagen, Denmark. He was the son of Ernst Anton Henrik Lammers (1770–1847) and Seriane Magdalena Hagen (1773–1843). His father was a Generalmajor. From 1818, he was a student of Hans Linstow at the State Craft and Art Industry School (Statens håndverks- og kunstindustriskole) in Christiania (now Oslo), Norway, which he combined with studies in theology. He took his examen artium in 1821 and earned his cand. theol. at the University of Christiania in 1825.

He was a priest at the Hospital Church in Trondheim from 1827 to 1835, during which time he was influenced by pietist and Moravian views and came to know Bishop Peder Olivarius Bugge. Lammers was then appointed parish priest in Bamble Municipality. From 1839 to 1844, he was the parliamentary representative at the Storting for the County of Bratsberg (now Telemark). He served as the architect of the newly constructed Bamble Church which was built in 1845 in Gothic revival style. He also designed Hisøy Church in Arendal Municipality (1846–1849), Tanum Church in Larvik Municipality (1848–1850) and a chapel in Skien (1850). Additionally he designed altarpieces for a number of churches including Bakke Church in Trondheim (1833), Bamble Church (1845), Fiskum Church in Øvre Eiker Municipality (1866) and Bø Church in Telemark (1866).

While studying in Germany, Lammers had a religious experience. Upon returning to Norway, he came into contact with a like-minded family focusing on prayer and the reading of the scriptures.

In 1845, the Dissenter Act was passed, allowing Christian church gatherings for services other than those of the Church of Norway. Lammers was ordained head minister (sogneprest) of Christians Church in Skien, but left the Church of Norway in July 1856. Andreas Hauge, son of the more well-known Hans Nielsen Hauge, then took over as head minister in Skien. Lammers then started Den frie apostolisk-christelige Menighed ('the Free Apostolic Christian Congregation'), the first dissenter congregation to break with the Church of Norway. The same year, he also published Forsvar for den frie apostolisk christelige Menighed og dens Forfatnings Grundtræk ('Defense of the Free Apostolic Christian Congregation and its ). Within several years, there were Lammers free churches and groups in some twenty locations in the country. After members of the new congregation began to practice rebaptism, Lammers returned to the state church in 1860. The congregation was dissolved in 1874.

Artistic interests took a greater place in Lammer's life after this. He also published several collections of hymns, including Christelig Psalmebog (Skien, 1852). He is buried at Lie Cemetery in Skien.

== Personal life ==
In 1829, he married Henriette Nicoline Rode (1810–1898), daughter of military officer Hans Henrik Rode. Lammers was the uncle of singer Thorvald Lammers.

== Influence ==
The Mission Covenant Church of Norway considers Lammers one of its founders. Lammers was noted by Henrik Ibsen as an influence for the character of Brand in the play of the same name.
