= Herre, Norway =

Village in Bamble Municipality, Norway

Herre
- Village
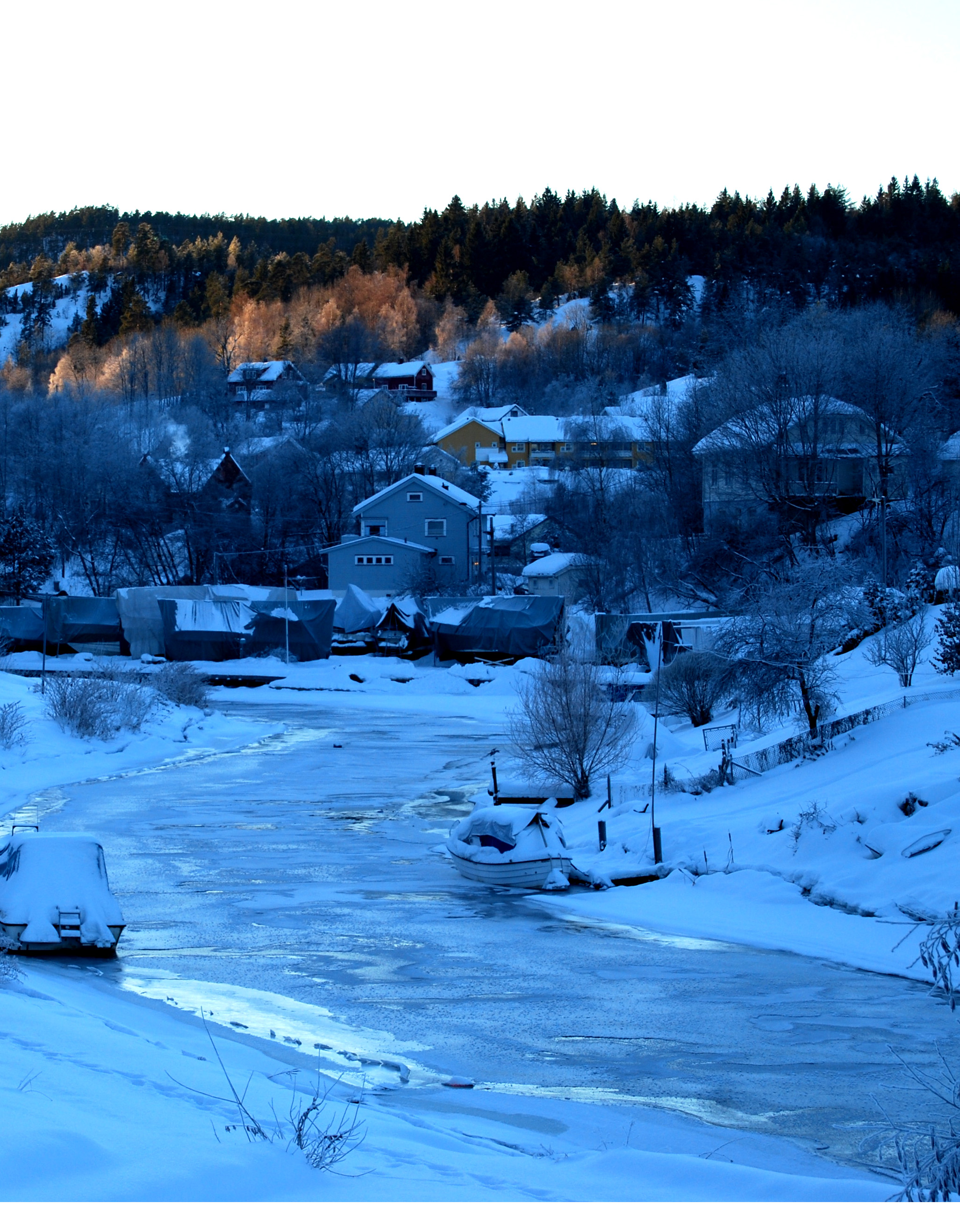
- View of the Herre river running through the village
- Interactive map of Herre
- Coordinates: 59.10351°N 9.56194°E
- Country: Norway
- Region: Eastern Norway
- County: Telemark
- District: Grenland
- Municipality: Bamble Municipality

Area
  - Total: 1.7 km^{2} (0.66 sq mi)
- Elevation: 6 m (20 ft)

Population (2025)
  - Total: 1,244
  - Density: 732/km^{2} (1,900/sq mi)
- Time zone: UTC+01:00 (CET)
  - Summer (DST): UTC+02:00 (CEST)
- Post Code: 3965 Herre

Herre is a village in Bamble Municipality in Telemark county, Norway. The village is located in the northern part of the municipality on the western side of the Frierfjord. There are road connections to Skien/Porsgrunn to the northeast and to the town of Stathelle to the southeast. Herre Church, built in 1905, is located in the village.

The 1.7-square-kilometre (420-acre) village has a population (2025) of 1,244 and a population density of 732 inhabitants per square kilometre (1,900/sq mi).

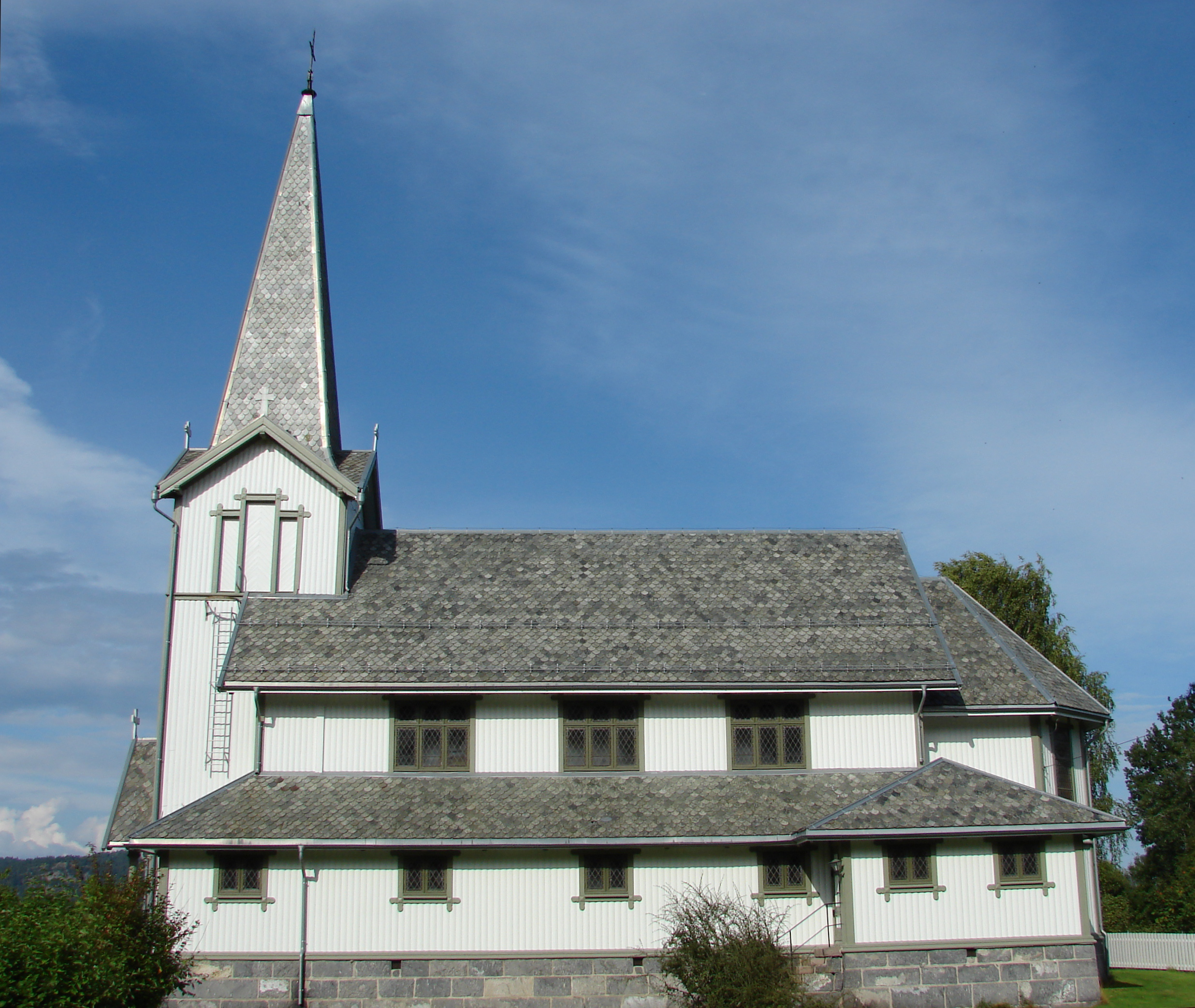
Herre Church

Herre School provides grades 1-10 education. During the 2018/19 school year, there were 156 pupils and 29 staff members, of which 15 were teachers. The school building was originally completed in 1953, but has been upgraded in recent years with a new gym.

== History ==
For a long time, the Herre river was an important source of jobs for the people of the village. In the late 1600s, with the opening of the Bolvik ironworks, Herre was established as one of Telemark's oldest industrial areas. In the 1850s, a coal mill was established just outside Herre, at Hellestvedt. In the early twentieth century, Compagnie Française de Mines de Bamble (later known as Norwegian Bamble A/S) was established in Herre to mine the large apatite deposits. Compagnie Française de Mines de Bamble was at the time one of Norway's biggest industrial companies. In 1907, Bamble's first power station was opened at Kongens Dam. Bamble Cellulosefabrikk was also an important workplace for the people of Herre from 1888 to 1978.
