= Bamble Church =

Church in Telemark, Norway

- Bamble kirke
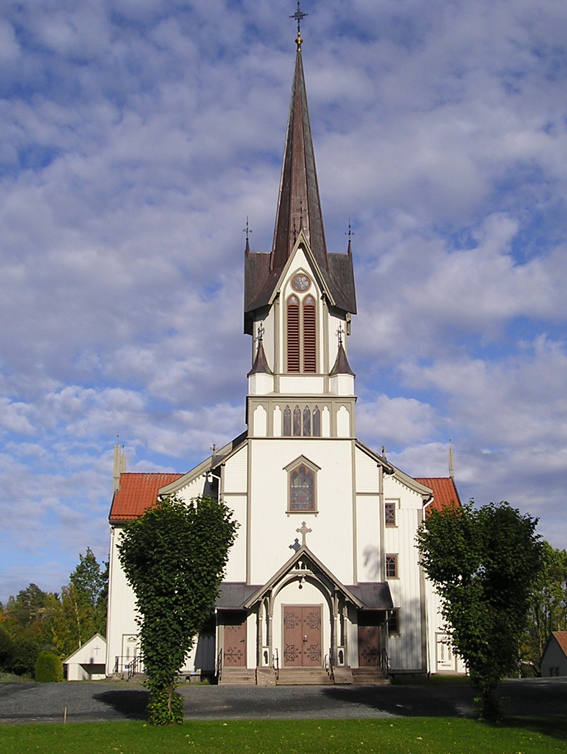
- View of the church
- Bamble Church
- 59°00′34″N 9°39′50″E
- Location: Bamble Municipality, Telemark
- Country: Norway
- Denomination: Church of Norway
- Previous denomination: Catholic Church
- Churchmanship: Evangelical Lutheran

History
- Status: Parish church
- Founded: 1845
- Consecrated: 19 October 1845

Architecture
- Functional status: Active
- Architect: G.A. Lammers
- Architectural type: Long church
- Style: Neo-Gothic
- Completed: 1845 (181 years ago)

Specifications
- Capacity: 400
- Materials: Wood

Administration
- Diocese: Agder og Telemark
- Deanery: Bamble prosti
- Parish: Bamble og Herre
- Norwegian Cultural Heritage Site
- Type: Church
- Status: Automatically protected
- ID: 83850

Bamble Church (Norwegian: Bamble kirke) is a parish church of the Church of Norway in Bamble Municipality in Telemark county, Norway. It is located in the village of Bamble. It is one of the churches for the Bamble og Herre parish which is part of the Bamble prosti (deanery) in the Diocese of Agder og Telemark. The white, wooden church was built in a long church design in 1845 using plans drawn up by the architect Gustav Adolph Lammers. The church seats about 400 people.

This modern church is built about 150 metres (490 ft) to the north of the ruins of the old St. Olav's Church, a much older stone church, probably constructed before 1150.

== History ==
The old Bamble Church, known as the St. Olav's Church served this parish for many centuries. By the 1840s, the old church was in need of replacement, so planning for a new church began. The old church was going to be torn down and the new church was to be built about 150 metres (490 ft) to the north of the old church. The new church was designed by the local parish priest Gustav Adolph Lammers, who was also the local mayor and a member of parliament for a while. Some modifications to the plan came from Christian Grosch, who worked for the Norwegian Ministry of Church Affairs. The church was consecrated on 19 October 1845. The church is considered by some to be Norway's first Neo-Gothic church. When it was built, some of the stone from the old medieval church was used in the foundation wall and the cemetery wall. The new church was technically a cruciform building, but the transepts that are the cross-arms are very small and short, so the interior of the church is set up as a long church. The two transepts are set up as galleries. In 1902, the church was renovated by the architect Hjalmar Welhaven. Among the things that were changed was the modest original tower was removed and a much larger tower was built in its place. In 1985, the church was again restored and some of the interior colors were changed.

== Artwork ==
The church has a large cross flanked by two altarpieces, both painted by Gustav Adolph Lammers. The cross was drawn by Per Vigeland and carved by brothers Anker and Bjarne Walle from Bamble. The 1951, stained glass window, with the risen Christ as a theme, is also by Vigeland. The church inventory also includes an exemplar of Christian III's Bible from 1550 and brass candlesticks that feudal lord Ove Gjedde bestowed to the old church in 1643.

== Media gallery ==
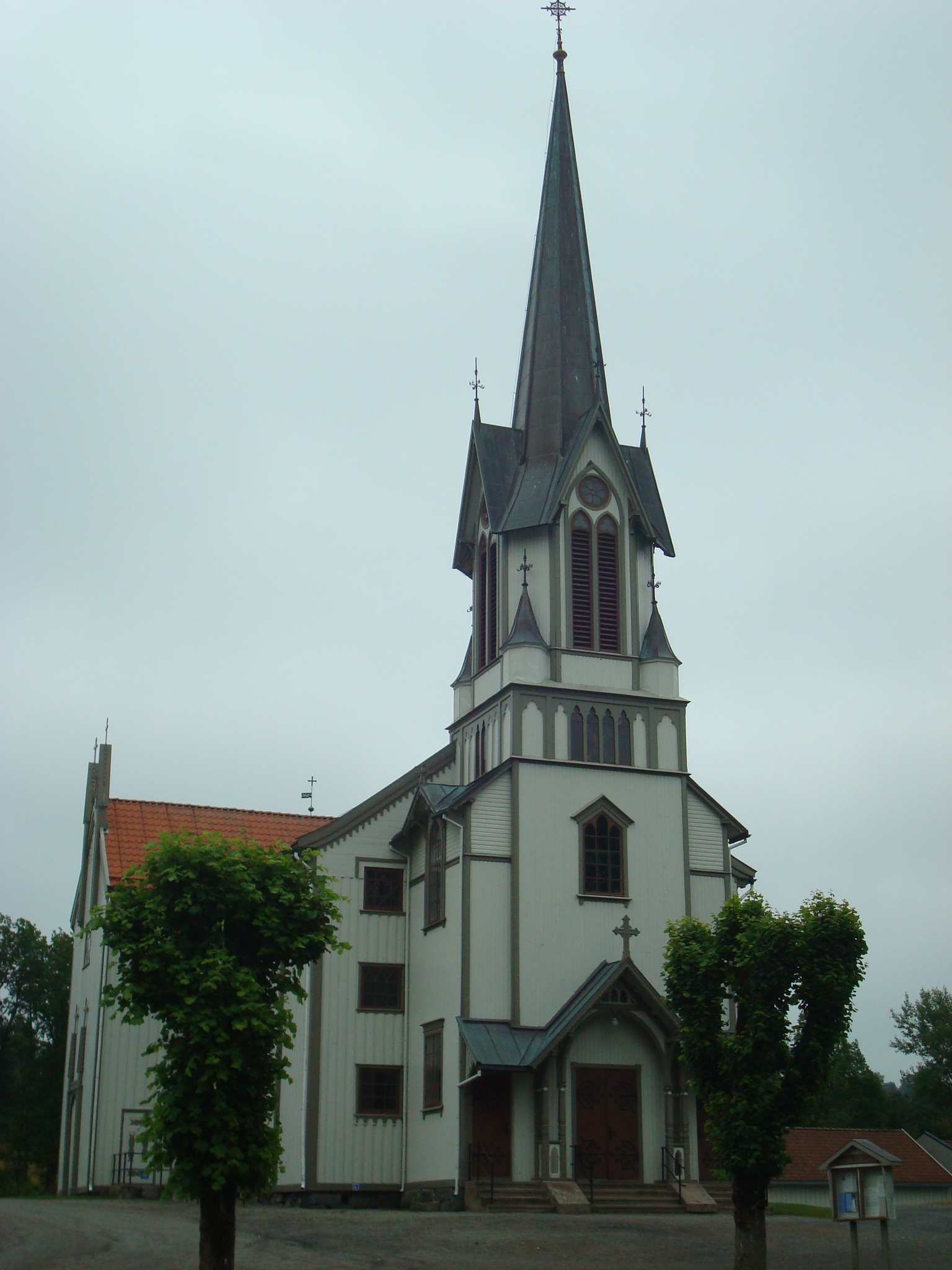
Exterior front

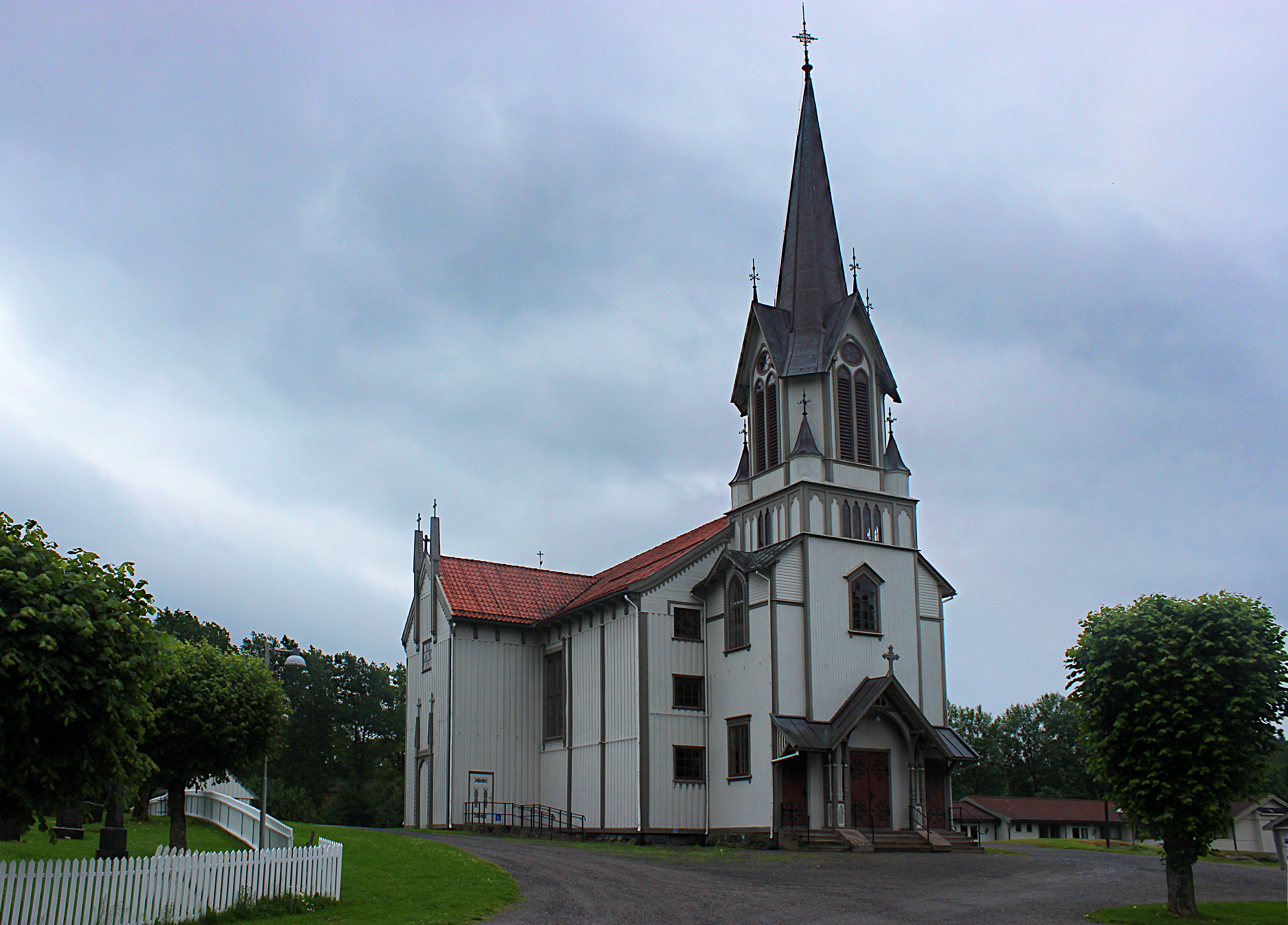
Exterior front/side

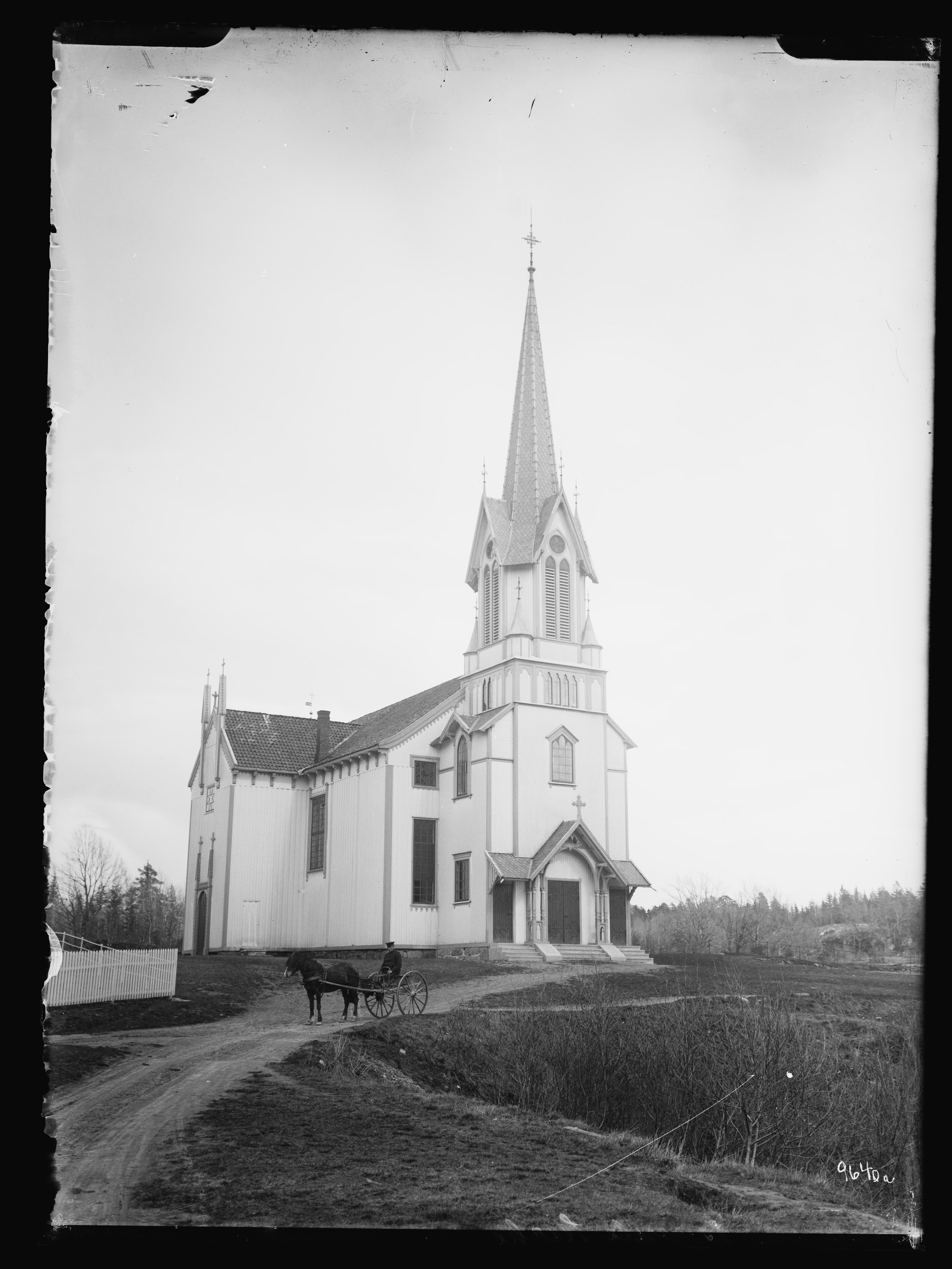
Photo from early 20th century

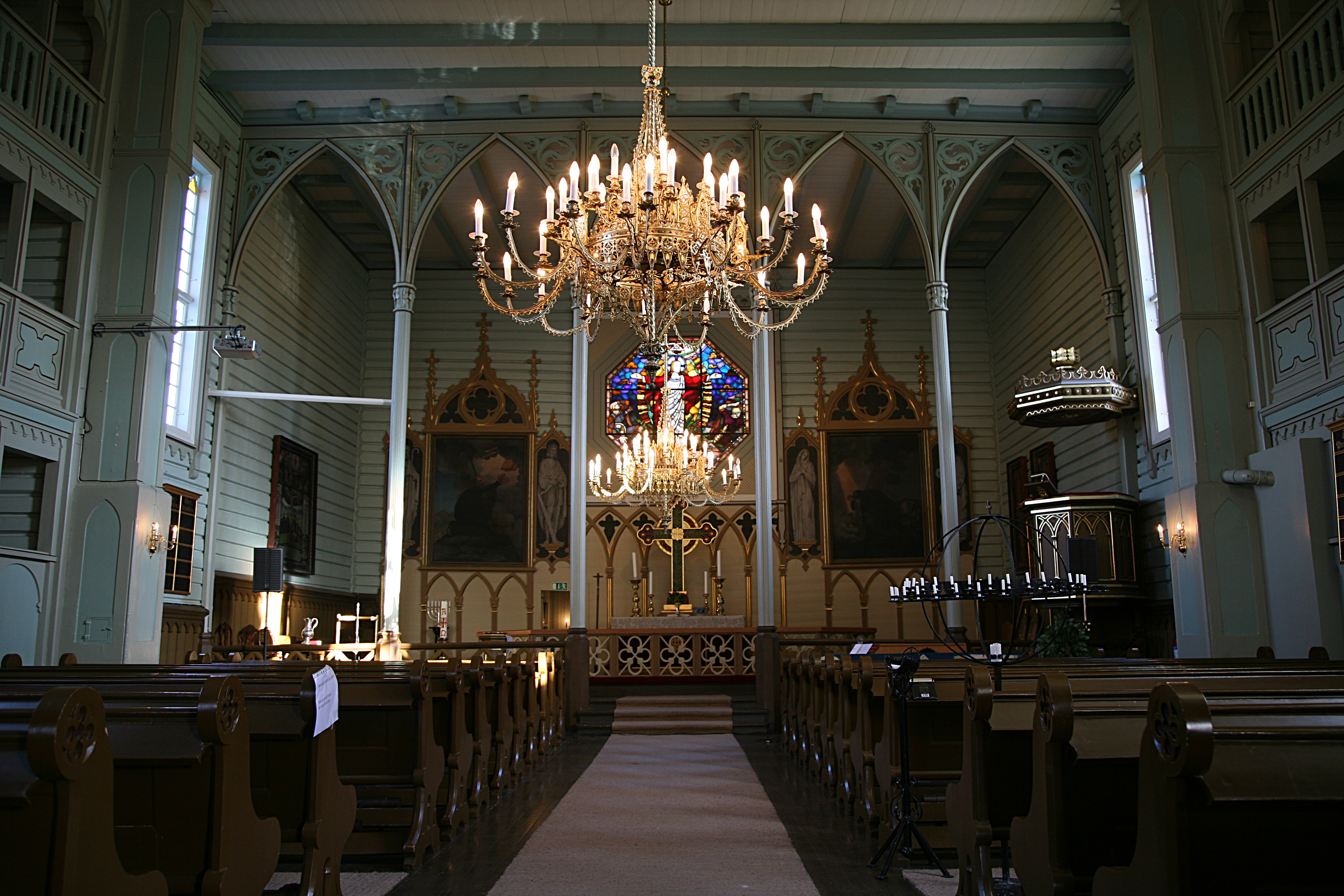
Interior

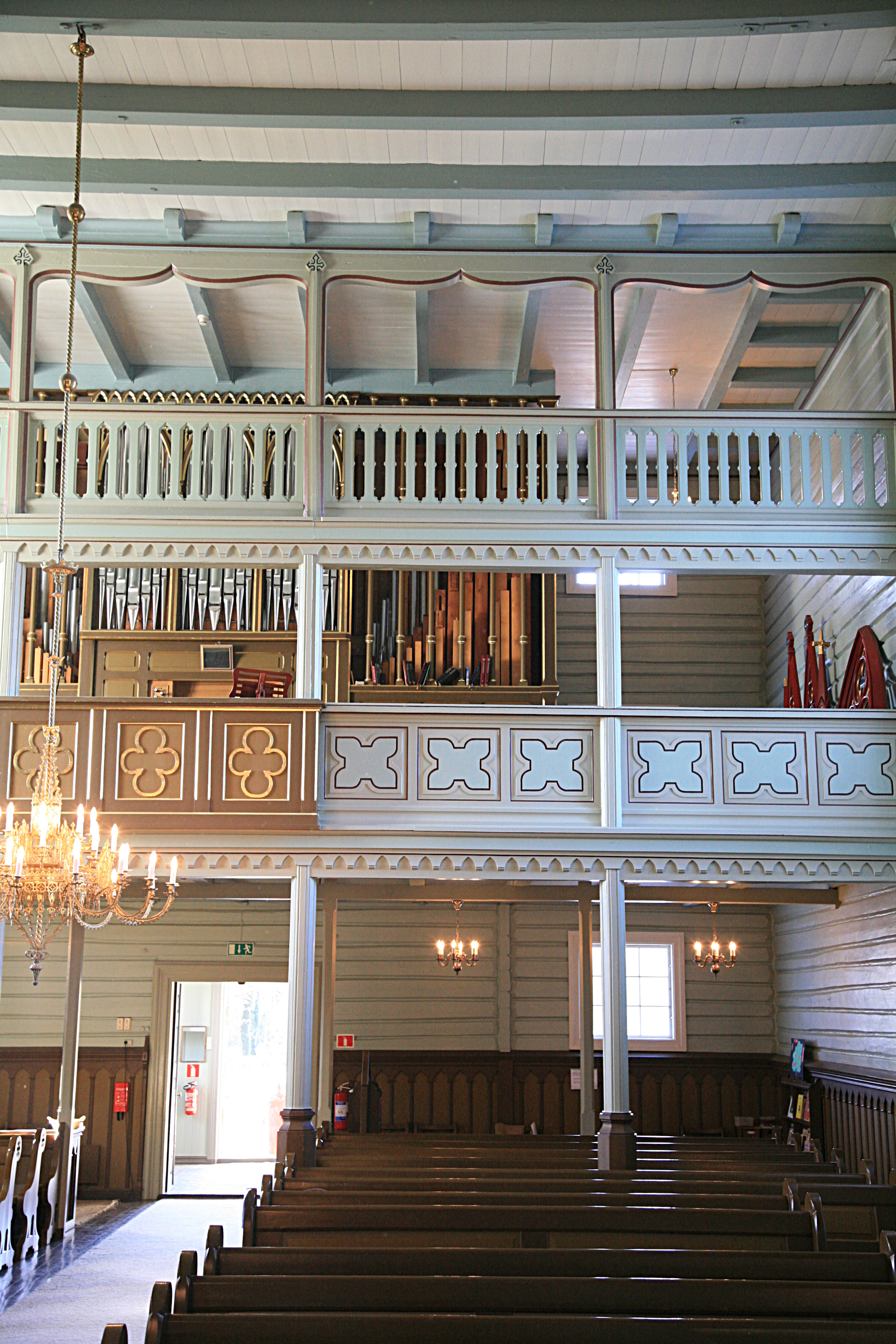
Balconies in the back of the church

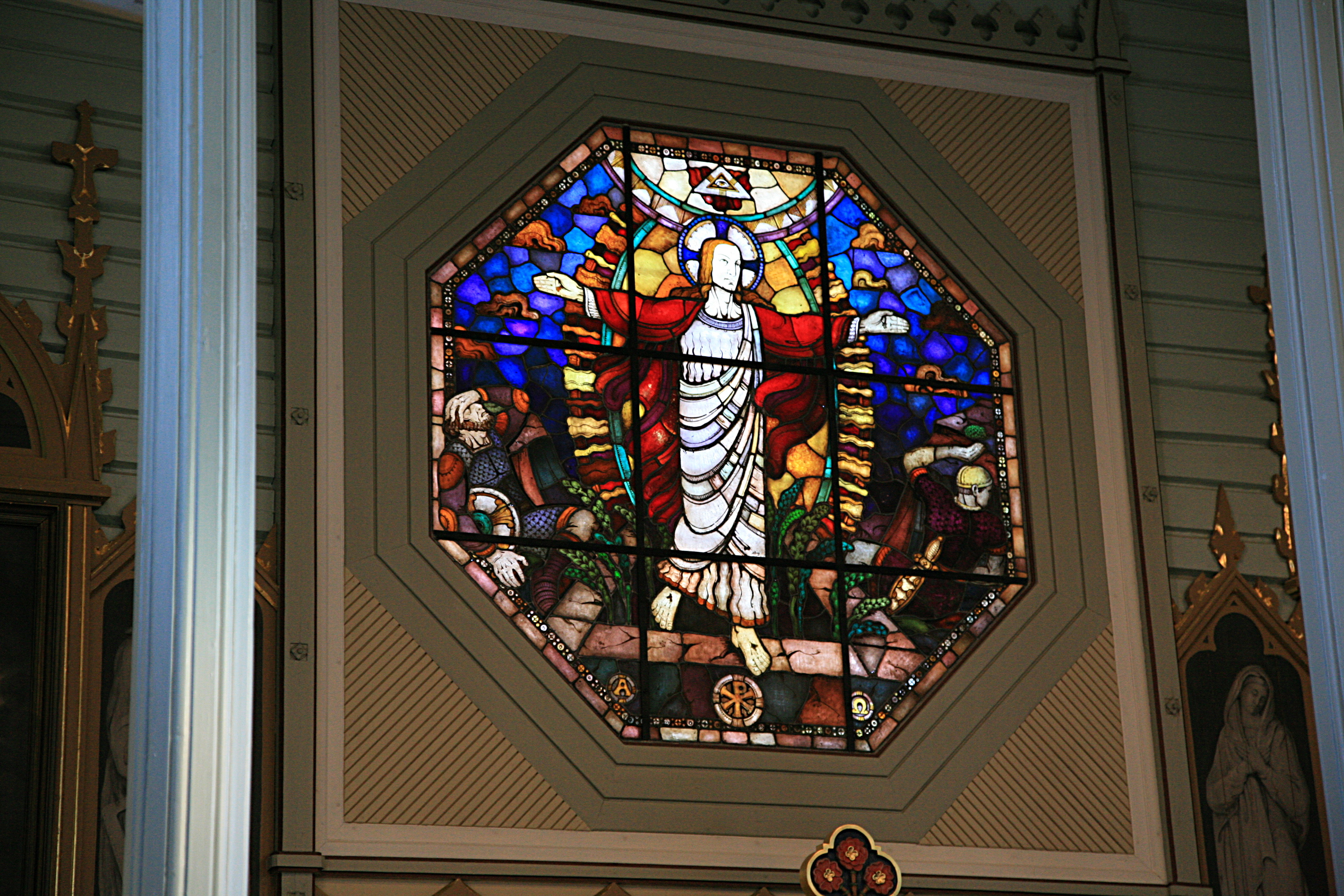
Stained glass at rear of church, depicting resurrection of Jesus, by Per Vigeland

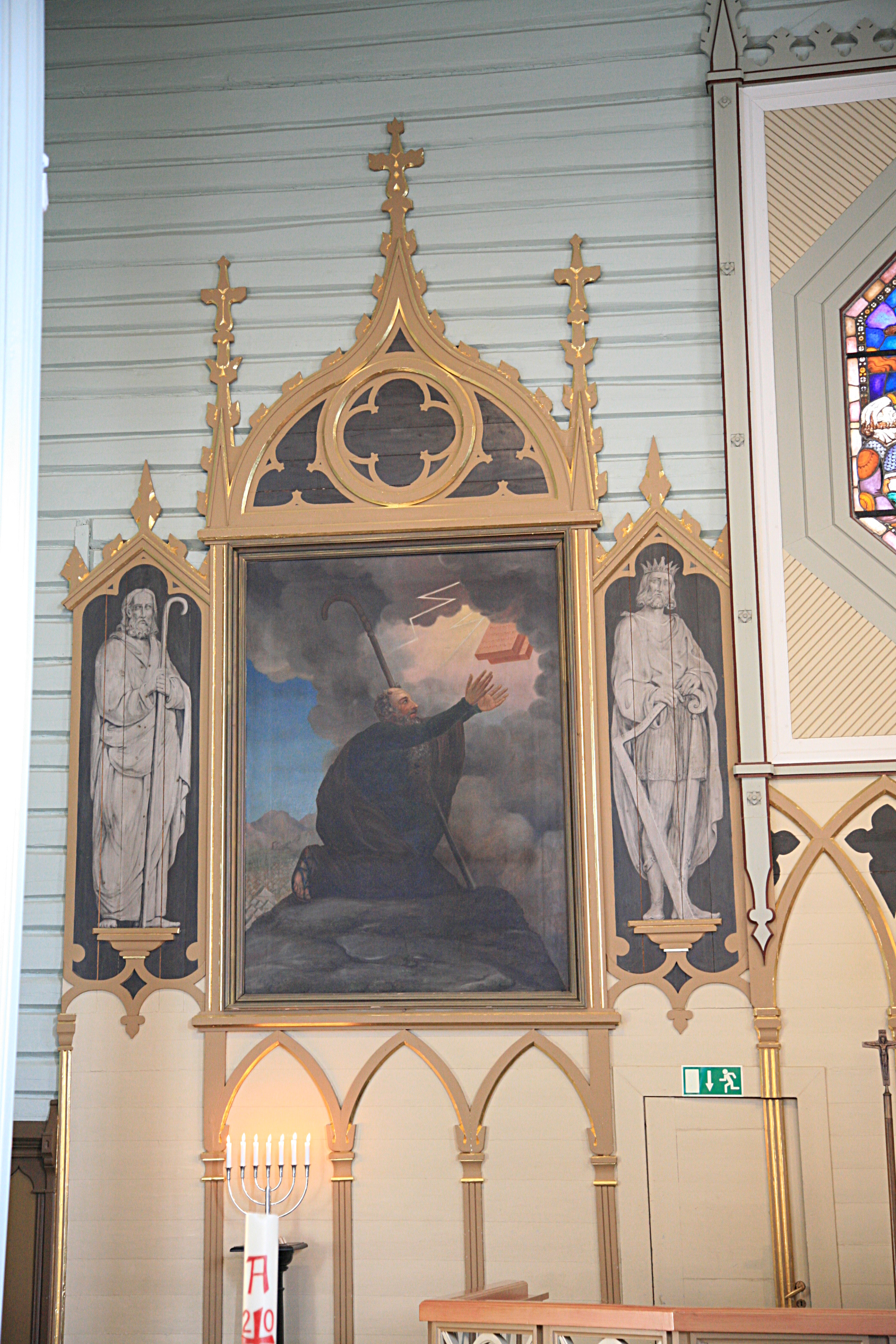
"The Law"; depicting Moses receiving the templates of law, by G.A. Lammers

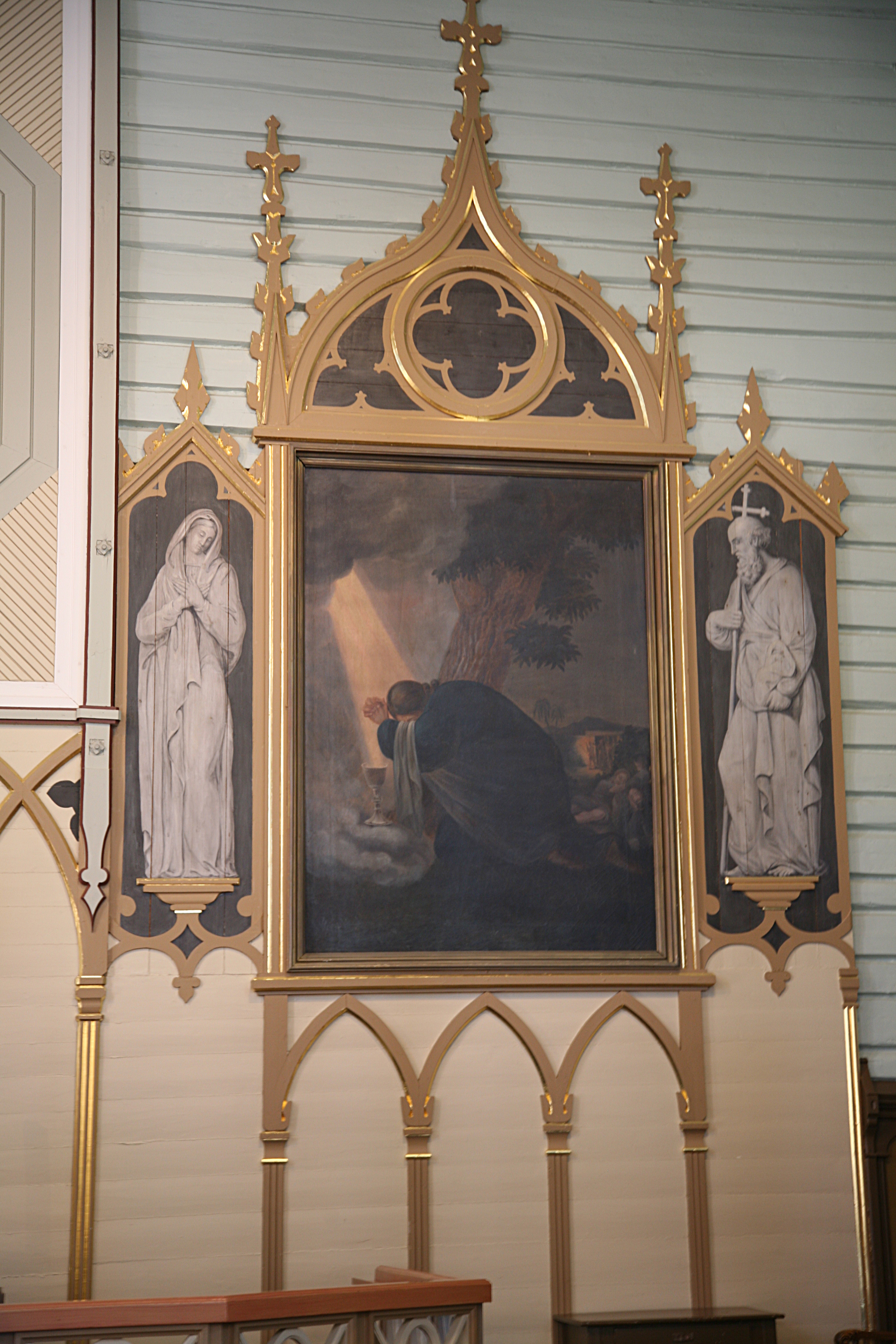
"The Gospel", depicting Jesus in Gethsemane, by G.A. Lammers

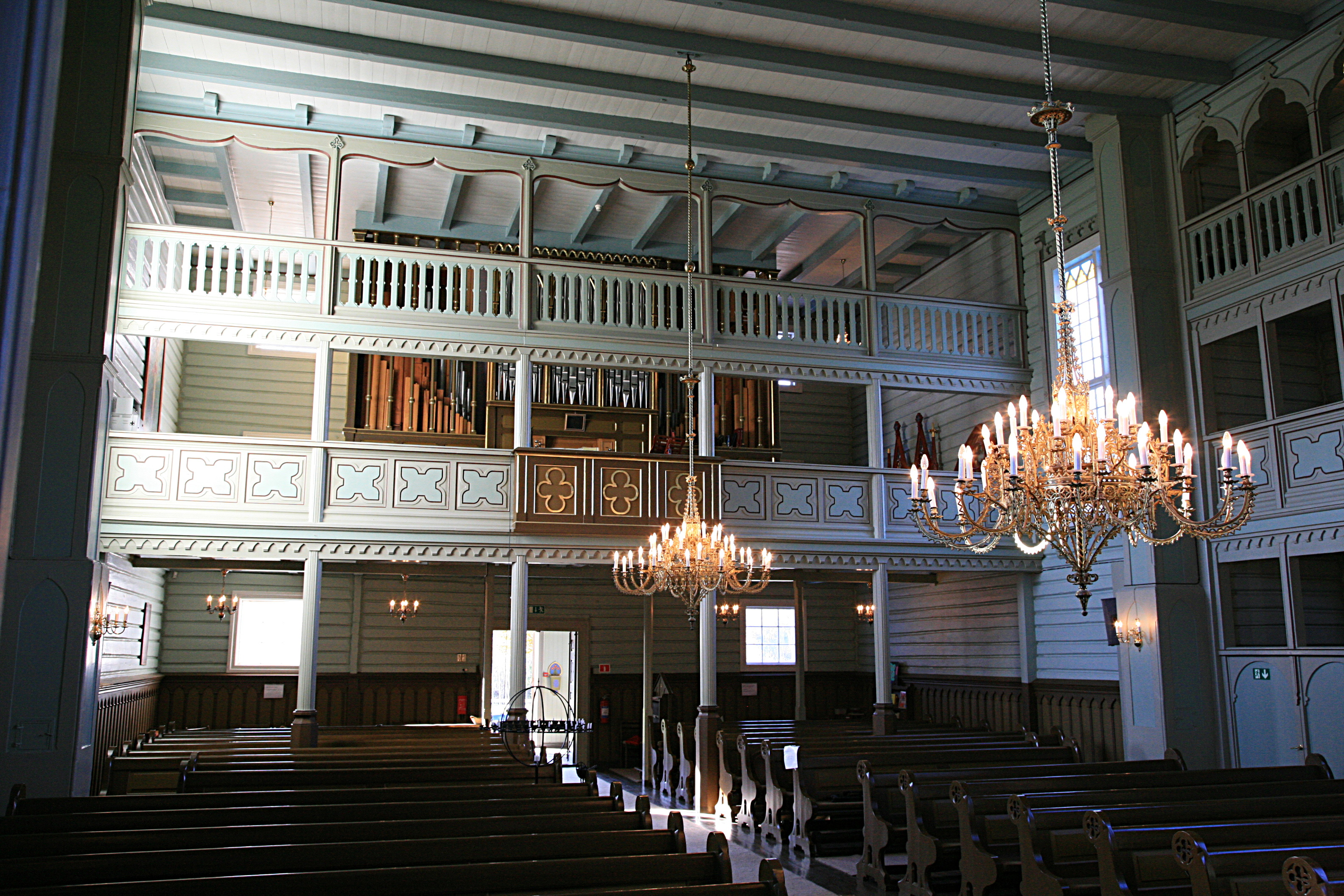
Organ gallery

== See also ==
- List of churches in Agder og Telemark
