= Bamble Municipality =

Municipality in Telemark, Norway

Bamble Municipality Bamble kommune
- Municipality
- Bamle herred (historic name)
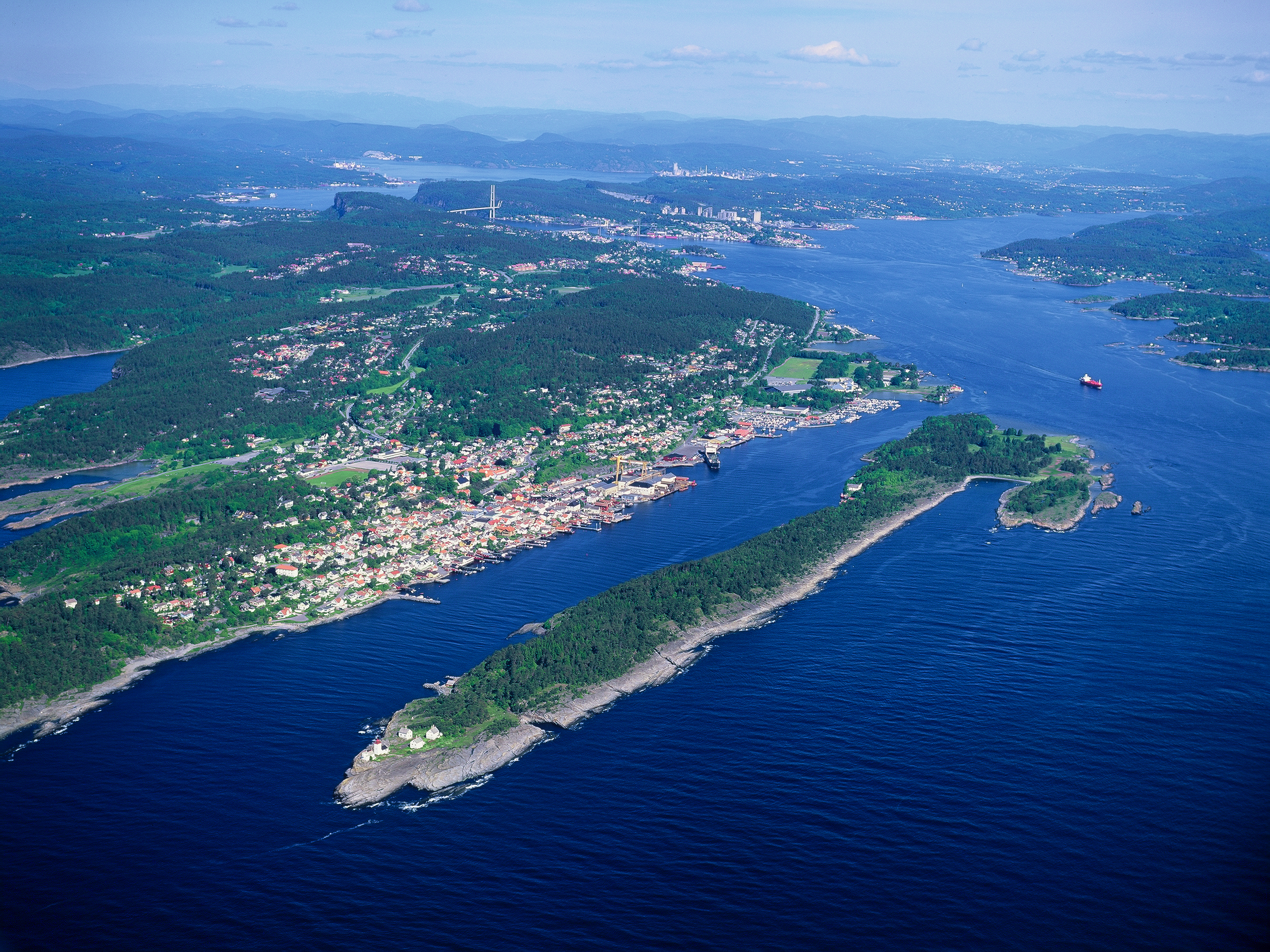
- Aerial view of northeastern Bamble and the Langesund-Stathelle area (left side of the fjord in the picture)

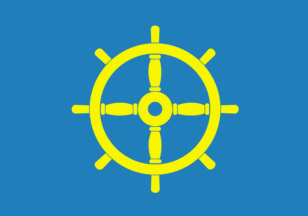
- Flag Coat of arms

- Telemark within Norway

- Bamble within Telemark
- Coordinates: 59°1′11″N 9°33′39″E
- Country: Norway
- County: Telemark
- District: Grenland
- Established: 1 Jan 1838
  - Created as: Formannskapsdistrikt
- Administrative centre: Langesund

Government
  - Mayor (2023): Jon Pieter Flølo (FrP)

Area
  - Total: 304.38 km^{2} (117.52 sq mi)
  - Land: 282.41 km^{2} (109.04 sq mi)
  - Water: 21.97 km^{2} (8.48 sq mi) 7.2%
  - Rank: #263 in Norway
- Highest elevation (Hørsfjell): 287.3 m (943 ft)

Population (2026)
  - Total: 14,267
  - Rank: #87 in Norway
  - Density: 50.5/km^{2} (131/sq mi)
  - Change (10 years): ▲ +1.3%
- Demonym(s): Bambling or Bamling; Bemling (archaic)

Official language
  - Norwegian form: Neutral
- Time zone: UTC+01:00 (CET)
  - Summer (DST): UTC+02:00 (CEST)
- ISO 3166 code: NO-4012
- Website: Official website

Bamble (Norwegian pronunciation: [ˈbɑmːblə]; locally [ˈbɑ̂mbɽə]) is a municipality in Telemark county, Norway. It is located in the traditional district of Grenland. The administrative centre of the municipality is the town of Langesund. Other population centres in Bamble include the town of Stathelle and the villages of Bamble, Botten, Herre, and Valle.

The 304.38-square-kilometre (117.52 sq mi) municipality is the 263rd largest by area out of the 357 municipalities in Norway. Bamble Municipality is the 87th most populous municipality in Norway with a population of 14,267. The municipality's population density is 50.5 inhabitants per square kilometre (131/sq mi) and its population has increased by 1.3% over the previous 10-year period.

== General information ==
=== Administrative history ===
The formannskapsdistrikt law of 1837 created a system of local government in Norway by establishing each town (ladested or kjøpstad) and each Church of Norway prestegjeld as a civil municipality. On 1 January 1838, Bamle prestegjeld was established as Bamle Municipality (later spelled Bamble).

On 1 January 1878, the island of Langøya (population: 22), just off shore from the town of Langesund, was transferred from the rural Bamble Municipality to the town of Langesund. In 1949, the town of Langesund was again enlarged by annexing an adjacent area of Bamble Municipality (population: 127).

During the 1960s, there were many municipal mergers across Norway due to the work of the Schei Committee. On 1 January 1964, the following areas were merged to form an enlarged Bamble Municipality:

- all of Bamble Municipality (population: 5,237)
- all of Langesund Municipality (population: 2,281)
- all of Stathelle Municipality (population: 724)

In 2020, there were many municipal and county mergers across Norway due to the work of the Solberg cabinet. Historically, this municipality was part of Telemark county. On 1 January 2020, the municipality became a part of the newly-formed Vestfold og Telemark county (after Telemark and Vestfold counties were merged). The merger was shortlived, and on 1 January 2024, the merger was undone and this municipality became part of Telemark county once again.

=== Name ===
The municipality is named after the old Bamble prestegjeld. The prestegjeld was named after the old Bamle farm (Old Norse: Bamblar). The meaning of the name is unknown. It is possible that the name is the plural form derived from the word bembel which means "belly". In this case, it was likely referring to a round hill or mountain.

Historically, the name of the municipality was spelled Bamle. On 3 November 1917, a royal resolution changed the spelling of the name of the municipality to Bamble.

=== Coat of arms ===
The coat of arms was granted on 12 December 1986. The official blazon is "Azure, a ship's wheel Or" (Norwegian: I blått et gull skipsratt). This means the arms have a blue field (background) and the charge is a ship's wheel. The charge has a tincture of Or which means it is commonly colored yellow, but if it is made out of metal, then gold is used. The arms are nearly identical to the former arms of the town Stathelle which used them from 1954 until 1964 when it became part of Bamble. The blue color in the field symbolizes the importance of the sea for this coastal municipality. Sailing and fishing have always been of great importance for the area, and a ship's wheel was thus an appropriate symbol. The arms were designed by Svein J. Haugholt. The municipal flag has the same design as the coat of arms.

=== Churches ===
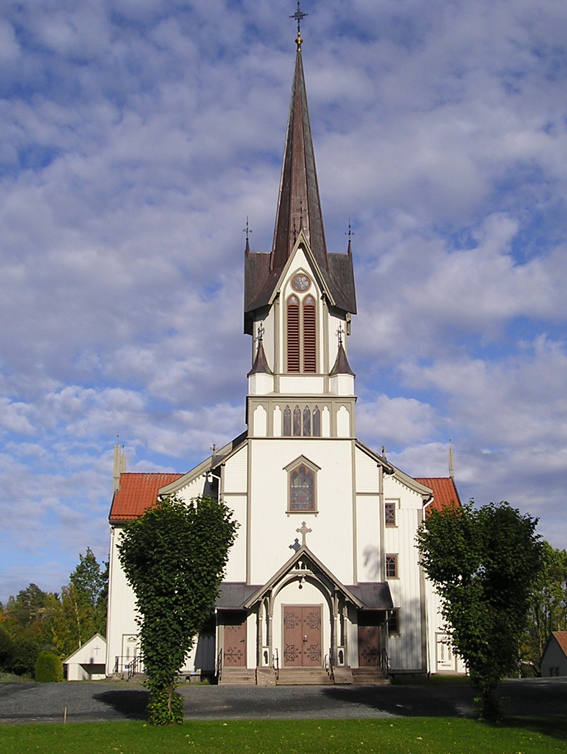
Bamble Church

The Church of Norway has three parishes (sokn) within Bamble Municipality. It is part of the Bamble prosti (deanery) in the Diocese of Agder og Telemark.

Churches in Bamble Municipality
Parish (sokn)	Church name	Location of the church	Year built
Bamble	Bamble Church	Bamble	1845
Bamble	Herre Church	Herre	1905
Langesund	Langesund Church	Langesund	1992
Stathelle	Stathelle Church	Stathelle	1964

Bamble Church (Bamble kirke) is located along the European route E18 highway, about 5 kilometres (3.1 mi) to the south of the Grenland Bridge. It is a wooden cruciform church which was built in 1845. The church is located next to the ruins of Olav Church which dated to around 1145.

== Geography ==
The municipality is located along the Skagerrak coast in southeastern Norway. The village is located on the west side of the Frierfjorden and Langesundsfjorden and to the northeast of the Fossingfjorden. The southeastern tip of the large lake Toke is located in northwestern Bamble. The European route E18 highway runs through the municipality, crossing into Porsgrunn Municipality via the Grenland Bridge. The Brevik Bridge also crosses the Frierfjorden, a short distance east of the Grenland Bridge. The Langøytangen Lighthouse is located near the town of Langesund. The highest point in the municipality is the 287.3-metre (943 ft) tall mountain Hørsfjell.

Skien Municipality is located to the north, Porsgrunn Municipality is located to the northeast, the Skagerrak is located to the east, Kragerø Municipality is located to the south, and Drangedal Municipality is located to the west.

== Geology ==
Bamble is located at the southern tip of the Kongsberg-Bamble geological formation. It has a unique geology that has been extensively researched by geologists such as W. C. Brøgger. It exhibits a high grade gneiss terrane characterized by metasomatism. As such there have been many mines operating in the area, most notably the Ødegården Verk apatite mines and the nickel mines in Nystein.

== Government ==
Bamble Municipality is responsible for primary education (through 10th grade), outpatient health services, senior citizen services, welfare and other social services, zoning, economic development, and municipal roads and utilities. The municipality is governed by a municipal council of directly elected representatives. The mayor is indirectly elected by a vote of the municipal council. The municipality is under the jurisdiction of the Nedre Telemark District Court and the Agder Court of Appeal.

=== Municipal council ===
The municipal council (Kommunestyre) of Bamble Municipality is made up of 33 representatives that are elected to four year terms. The tables below show the current and historical composition of the council by political party.

Bamble kommunestyre 2023–2027
Party name (in Norwegian)	Number of representatives
Labour Party (Arbeiderpartiet)	8
Progress Party (Fremskrittspartiet)	12
Conservative Party (Høyre)	4
Christian Democratic Party (Kristelig Folkeparti)	2
Red Party (Rødt)	2
Centre Party (Senterpartiet)	3
Socialist Left Party (Sosialistisk Venstreparti)	1
Liberal Party (Venstre)	1
Total number of members:	33

Bamble kommunestyre 2019–2023
Party name (in Norwegian)	Number of representatives
Labour Party (Arbeiderpartiet)	12
Progress Party (Fremskrittspartiet)	6
Green Party (Miljøpartiet De Grønne)	1
Conservative Party (Høyre)	4
Christian Democratic Party (Kristelig Folkeparti)	1
Red Party (Rødt)	2
Centre Party (Senterpartiet)	5
Socialist Left Party (Sosialistisk Venstreparti)	1
Together for Bamble (Sammen for Bamble)	1
Total number of members:	33

Bamble kommunestyre 2015–2019
Party name (in Norwegian)	Number of representatives
Labour Party (Arbeiderpartiet)	13
Progress Party (Fremskrittspartiet)	10
Conservative Party (Høyre)	4
Christian Democratic Party (Kristelig Folkeparti)	2
Red Party (Rødt)	1
Centre Party (Senterpartiet)	2
Liberal Party (Venstre)	1
Total number of members:	33

Bamble kommunestyre 2011–2015
Party name (in Norwegian)	Number of representatives
Labour Party (Arbeiderpartiet)	12
Progress Party (Fremskrittspartiet)	11
Conservative Party (Høyre)	5
Christian Democratic Party (Kristelig Folkeparti)	2
Red Party (Rødt)	1
Centre Party (Senterpartiet)	1
Liberal Party (Venstre)	1
Total number of members:	33

Bamble kommunestyre 2007–2011
Party name (in Norwegian)	Number of representatives
Labour Party (Arbeiderpartiet)	9
Progress Party (Fremskrittspartiet)	10
Conservative Party (Høyre)	2
Christian Democratic Party (Kristelig Folkeparti)	2
Centre Party (Senterpartiet)	1
Liberal Party (Venstre)	1
Joint list of the Red Electoral Alliance (Rød Valgallianse) and the Socialist Left Party (Sosialistisk Venstreparti)	2
Total number of members:	27

Bamble kommunestyre 2003–2007
Party name (in Norwegian)	Number of representatives
Labour Party (Arbeiderpartiet)	9
Progress Party (Fremskrittspartiet)	8
Conservative Party (Høyre)	3
Christian Democratic Party (Kristelig Folkeparti)	2
Red Electoral Alliance (Rød Valgallianse)	1
Centre Party (Senterpartiet)	2
Socialist Left Party (Sosialistisk Venstreparti)	2
Total number of members:	27

Bamble kommunestyre 1999–2003
Party name (in Norwegian)	Number of representatives
Labour Party (Arbeiderpartiet)	14
Progress Party (Fremskrittspartiet)	7
Conservative Party (Høyre)	7
Christian Democratic Party (Kristelig Folkeparti)	6
Red Electoral Alliance (Rød Valgallianse)	1
Centre Party (Senterpartiet)	1
Socialist Left Party (Sosialistisk Venstreparti)	2
Liberal Party (Venstre)	1
Total number of members:	39

Bamble kommunestyre 1995–1999
Party name (in Norwegian)	Number of representatives
Labour Party (Arbeiderpartiet)	14
Progress Party (Fremskrittspartiet)	6
Conservative Party (Høyre)	8
Christian Democratic Party (Kristelig Folkeparti)	4
Red Electoral Alliance (Rød Valgallianse)	2
Centre Party (Senterpartiet)	4
Socialist Left Party (Sosialistisk Venstreparti)	4
Liberal Party (Venstre)	3
Total number of members:	45

Bamble kommunestyre 1991–1995
Party name (in Norwegian)	Number of representatives
Labour Party (Arbeiderpartiet)	13
Progress Party (Fremskrittspartiet)	3
Conservative Party (Høyre)	7
Christian Democratic Party (Kristelig Folkeparti)	4
Red Electoral Alliance (Rød Valgallianse)	2
Centre Party (Senterpartiet)	4
Socialist Left Party (Sosialistisk Venstreparti)	8
Liberal Party (Venstre)	2
Independent Conservative List (Uavhengig konservativ list)	2
Total number of members:	45

Bamble kommunestyre 1987–1991
Party name (in Norwegian)	Number of representatives
Labour Party (Arbeiderpartiet)	18
Progress Party (Fremskrittspartiet)	4
Conservative Party (Høyre)	9
Christian Democratic Party (Kristelig Folkeparti)	3
Red Electoral Alliance (Rød Valgallianse)	1
Centre Party (Senterpartiet)	2
Socialist Left Party (Sosialistisk Venstreparti)	2
Liberal Party (Venstre)	2
Herre Local List (Herre Grendeliste)	4
Total number of members:	45

Bamble kommunestyre 1983–1987
Party name (in Norwegian)	Number of representatives
Labour Party (Arbeiderpartiet)	23
Progress Party (Fremskrittspartiet)	1
Conservative Party (Høyre)	11
Christian Democratic Party (Kristelig Folkeparti)	4
Centre Party (Senterpartiet)	1
Socialist Left Party (Sosialistisk Venstreparti)	2
Liberal Party (Venstre)	3
Total number of members:	45

Bamble kommunestyre 1979–1983
Party name (in Norwegian)	Number of representatives
Labour Party (Arbeiderpartiet)	21
Conservative Party (Høyre)	12
Christian Democratic Party (Kristelig Folkeparti)	5
Centre Party (Senterpartiet)	2
Socialist Left Party (Sosialistisk Venstreparti)	2
Joint list of the Liberal Party (Venstre) and New People's Party (Nye Folkepartiet)	3
Total number of members:	45

Bamble kommunestyre 1975–1979
Party name (in Norwegian)	Number of representatives
Labour Party (Arbeiderpartiet)	21
Conservative Party (Høyre)	5
Christian Democratic Party (Kristelig Folkeparti)	7
Centre Party (Senterpartiet)	4
Socialist Left Party (Sosialistisk Venstreparti)	3
Joint list of the Liberal Party (Venstre) and New People's Party (Nye Folkepartiet)	5
Total number of members:	45

Bamble kommunestyre 1971–1975
Party name (in Norwegian)	Number of representatives
Labour Party (Arbeiderpartiet)	23
Conservative Party (Høyre)	4
Christian Democratic Party (Kristelig Folkeparti)	4
Centre Party (Senterpartiet)	4
Socialist People's Party (Sosialistisk Folkeparti)	3
Liberal Party (Venstre)	7
Total number of members:	45

Bamble kommunestyre 1967–1971
Party name (in Norwegian)	Number of representatives
Labour Party (Arbeiderpartiet)	23
Conservative Party (Høyre)	4
Christian Democratic Party (Kristelig Folkeparti)	4
Centre Party (Senterpartiet)	3
Socialist People's Party (Sosialistisk Folkeparti)	4
Liberal Party (Venstre)	7
Total number of members:	45

Bamble kommunestyre 1963–1967
Party name (in Norwegian)	Number of representatives
Labour Party (Arbeiderpartiet)	26
Conservative Party (Høyre)	5
Christian Democratic Party (Kristelig Folkeparti)	3
Centre Party (Senterpartiet)	3
Socialist People's Party (Sosialistisk Folkeparti)	2
Liberal Party (Venstre)	6
Total number of members:	45

Bamble herredsstyre 1959–1963
Party name (in Norwegian)	Number of representatives
Labour Party (Arbeiderpartiet)	18
Conservative Party (Høyre)	2
Christian Democratic Party (Kristelig Folkeparti)	2
Centre Party (Senterpartiet)	3
Liberal Party (Venstre)	4
Total number of members:	29

Bamble herredsstyre 1955–1959
Party name (in Norwegian)	Number of representatives
Labour Party (Arbeiderpartiet)	16
Conservative Party (Høyre)	2
Communist Party (Kommunistiske Parti)	1
Christian Democratic Party (Kristelig Folkeparti)	2
Farmers' Party (Bondepartiet)	4
Liberal Party (Venstre)	4
Total number of members:	29

Bamble herredsstyre 1951–1955
Party name (in Norwegian)	Number of representatives
Labour Party (Arbeiderpartiet)	16
Conservative Party (Høyre)	2
Communist Party (Kommunistiske Parti)	1
Christian Democratic Party (Kristelig Folkeparti)	2
Farmers' Party (Bondepartiet)	3
Liberal Party (Venstre)	4
Total number of members:	28

Bamble herredsstyre 1947–1951
Party name (in Norwegian)	Number of representatives
Labour Party (Arbeiderpartiet)	12
Conservative Party (Høyre)	2
Communist Party (Kommunistiske Parti)	3
Christian Democratic Party (Kristelig Folkeparti)	3
Farmers' Party (Bondepartiet)	3
Liberal Party (Venstre)	5
Total number of members:	28

Bamble herredsstyre 1945–1947
Party name (in Norwegian)	Number of representatives
Labour Party (Arbeiderpartiet)	13
Conservative Party (Høyre)	2
Communist Party (Kommunistiske Parti)	3
Christian Democratic Party (Kristelig Folkeparti)	3
Farmers' Party (Bondepartiet)	3
Liberal Party (Venstre)	3
Joint List(s) of Non-Socialist Parties (Borgerlige Felleslister)	1
Total number of members:	28

Bamble herredsstyre 1937–1940*
Party name (in Norwegian)	Number of representatives
Labour Party (Arbeiderpartiet)	11
Conservative Party (Høyre)	4
Farmers' Party (Bondepartiet)	4
Liberal Party (Venstre)	8
Joint List(s) of Non-Socialist Parties (Borgerlige Felleslister)	1
Total number of members:	28
Note: Due to the German occupation of Norway during World War II, no elections were held for new municipal councils until after the war ended in 1945.

=== Mayors ===
The mayor (Norwegian: ordfører) of Bamble Municipality is the political leader of the municipality and the chairperson of the municipal council. The following people have held this position:

- 1838–1839: Rev. Gustav Adolph Lammers
- 1839–1843: Albert Blehr
- 1843–1847: Rev. Gustav Adolph Lammers
- 1847–1855: Simon N. Linna
- 1855–1867: M.D. Tonning
- 1867–1873: Aslak O. Myrland
- 1873–1877: Peder Andreas Christensen
- 1877–1885: Søren Moe
- 1885–1887: Nils Linna
- 1887–1895: Christian Erichsen
- 1895–1898: Jacob Hafreager
- 1898–1901: P.A. Tangvald
- 1901–1902: Olaf Frich
- 1902–1904: Halvor Sannes
- 1904–1905: Fredrik Thorleif Berg
- 1905–1908: Nils Wissestad
- 1908–1911: Halvor Sannes
- 1911–1914: Kristian Hougen
- 1914–1919: Jens Rosland
- 1919–1922: Herman Løvenskiold (H)
- 1922–1928: Nils J. Elvig
- 1928–1929: Peder Bjurholt
- 1929–1931: P.K. Stadheim
- 1931–1934: Nils J. Elvig
- 1934–1941: Sigurd Wefald (V)
- 1941–1945: Iver Skjerkholt (NS)
- 1945–1945: Sigurd Wefald (V)
- 1945–1963: Eugen Asdahl (Ap)
- 1963–1971: Harald K. Pedersen (Ap)
- 1971–1979: Kjell Bohlin (Ap)
- 1979–1983: Egil Thomassen (Ap)
- 1983–1991: Tom Hafredal (Ap)
- 1991–1995: Jostein Rise (Ap)
- 1995–2003: Jan Erik Gyllensten (KrF)
- 2003–2007: Anne Margrete Blaker (Ap)
- 2007–2015: Jon Pieter Flølo (FrP)
- 2015–2023: Hallgeir Kjeldal (Ap)
- 2023–present: Jon Pieter Flølo (FrP)

== Twin towns – sister cities ==
Bamble has sister city agreements with the following places:

- Akranes, Iceland
- Närpes, Finland
- Tønder, Denmark
- Västervik, Sweden

== Notable people ==
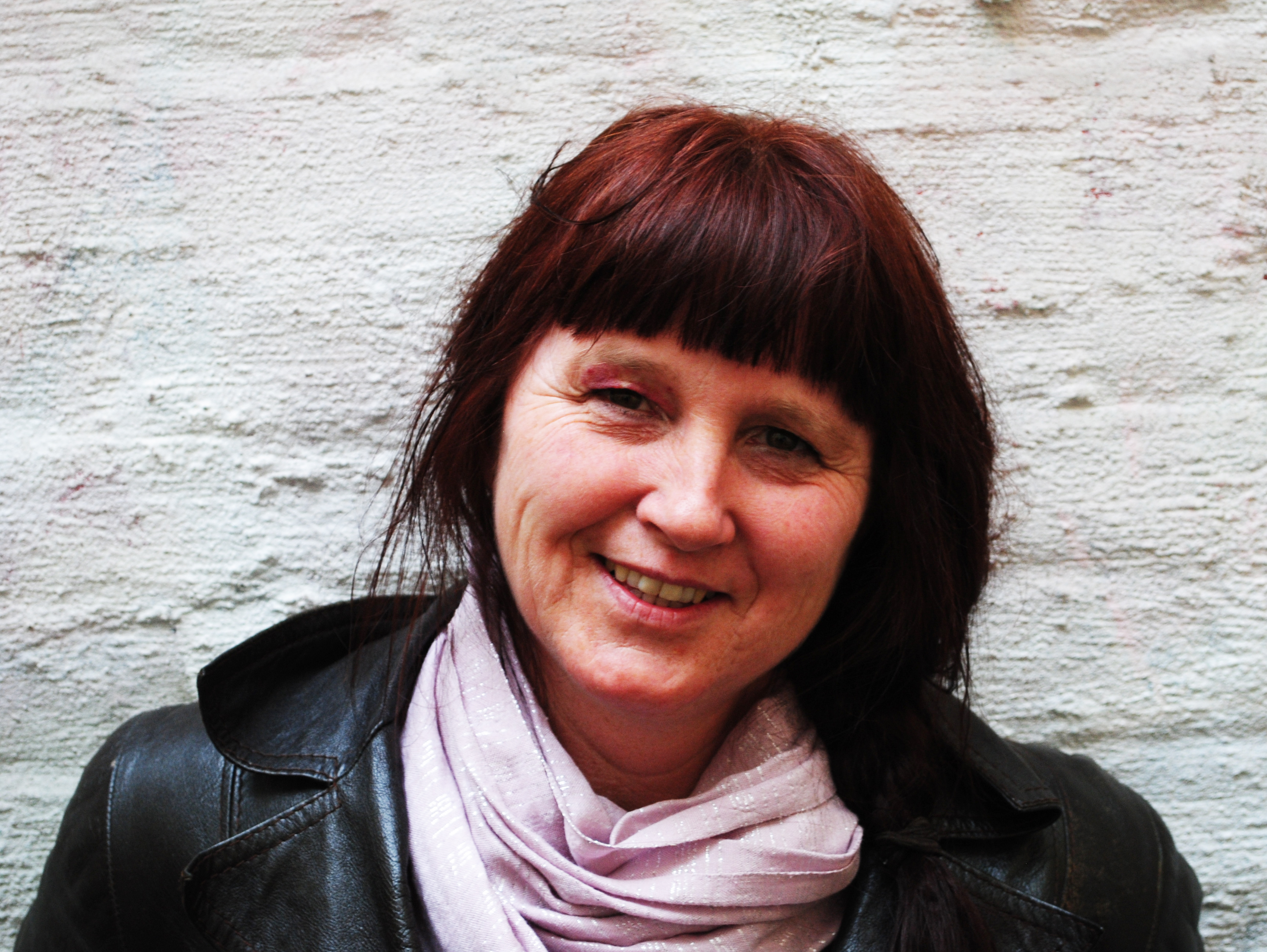
Turid Thomassen, 2010

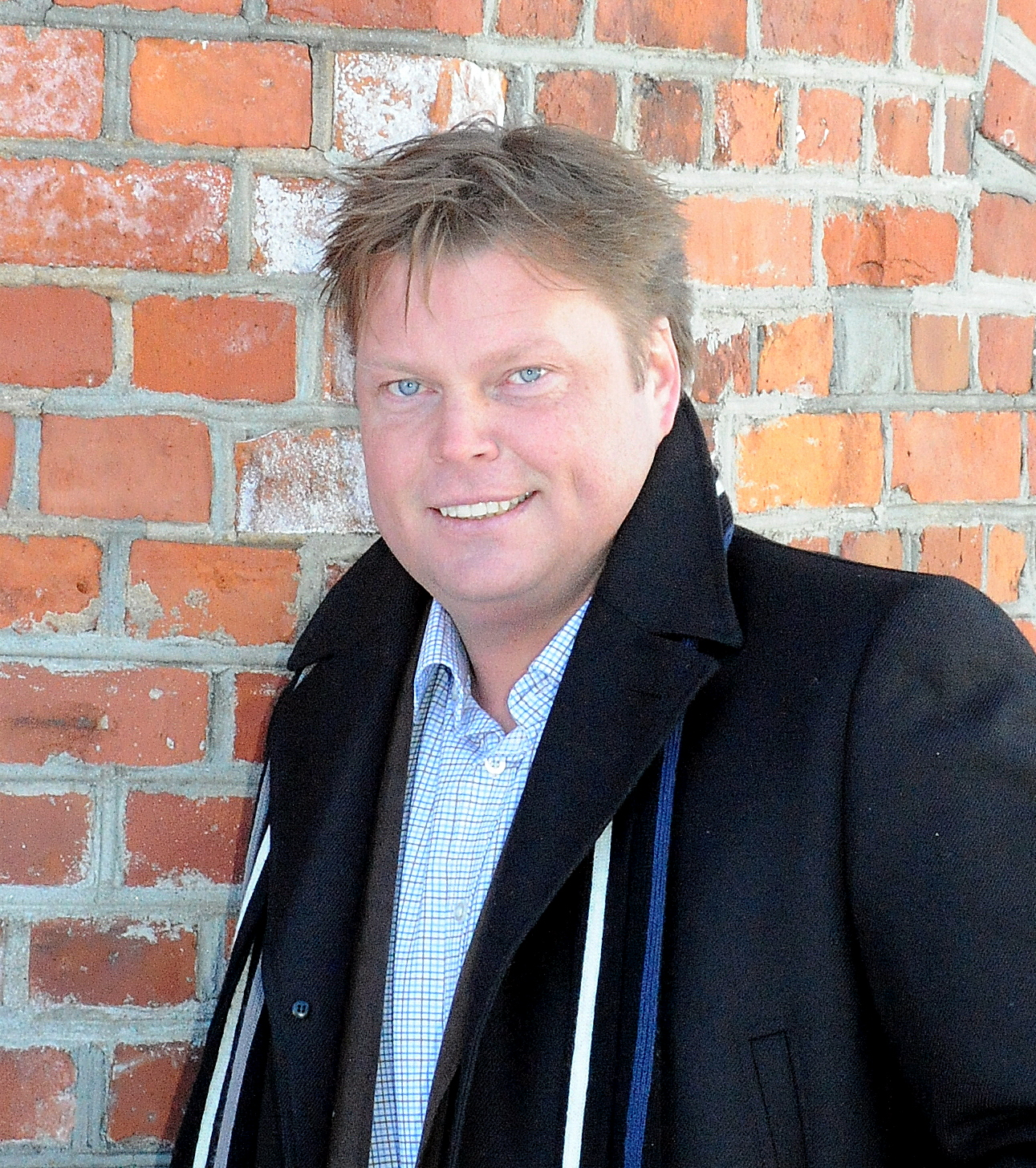
Jørn Lier Horst, 2010

- Marcus Olaus Bockman (1849 in Langesund – 1942), a Norwegian-American Lutheran theologian in Minnesota
- Marie Høeg (1866 in Langesund – 1949), a photographer and suffragist
- William Houlder Zachariasen (1906 in Langesund – 1979), a Norwegian-American physicist, pioneering specialist in X-ray crystallography and the structure of glass in Chicago
- Arne Selberg (1910 in Langesund – 1989), a civil engineer who designed suspension bridges
- Sigmund Selberg (1910–1994), a mathematician who worked on the distribution of prime numbers
- Atle Selberg (1917 in Langesund – 2007), a mathematician who worked on analytic number theory
- Kjell Bohlin (1928–2011), a politician and Mayor of Bamble from 1971 to 1981
- Turid Thomassen (born 1965 in Stathelle), the leader of the Norwegian Red party 2010 to 2012
- Sverre Gjørvad (born 1966 in Stathelle), a jazz musician (drums) and composer
- Odd Ivar Solvold (born 1969 in Bamble), a chef, restaurateur, and author of cook books
- Jørn Lier Horst (born 1970 in Bamble), an author of crime fiction and former Police officer
- Kenneth Nilsen (born 1994 in Bamble), a music producer who uses the stage name K-391

=== Sport ===
- Thor Thorvaldsen (1909 in Bamble – 1987), a sailor and two-time Olympic champion
- Jan Halvor Halvorsen (born 1963 in Bamble), a former footballer with 250 club caps and 5 for Norway
- Ella Gjømle Berg (born 1979 in Stathelle), a cross-country skier
