= Bamble (village) =

Village in Bamble Municipality, Norway

- Village
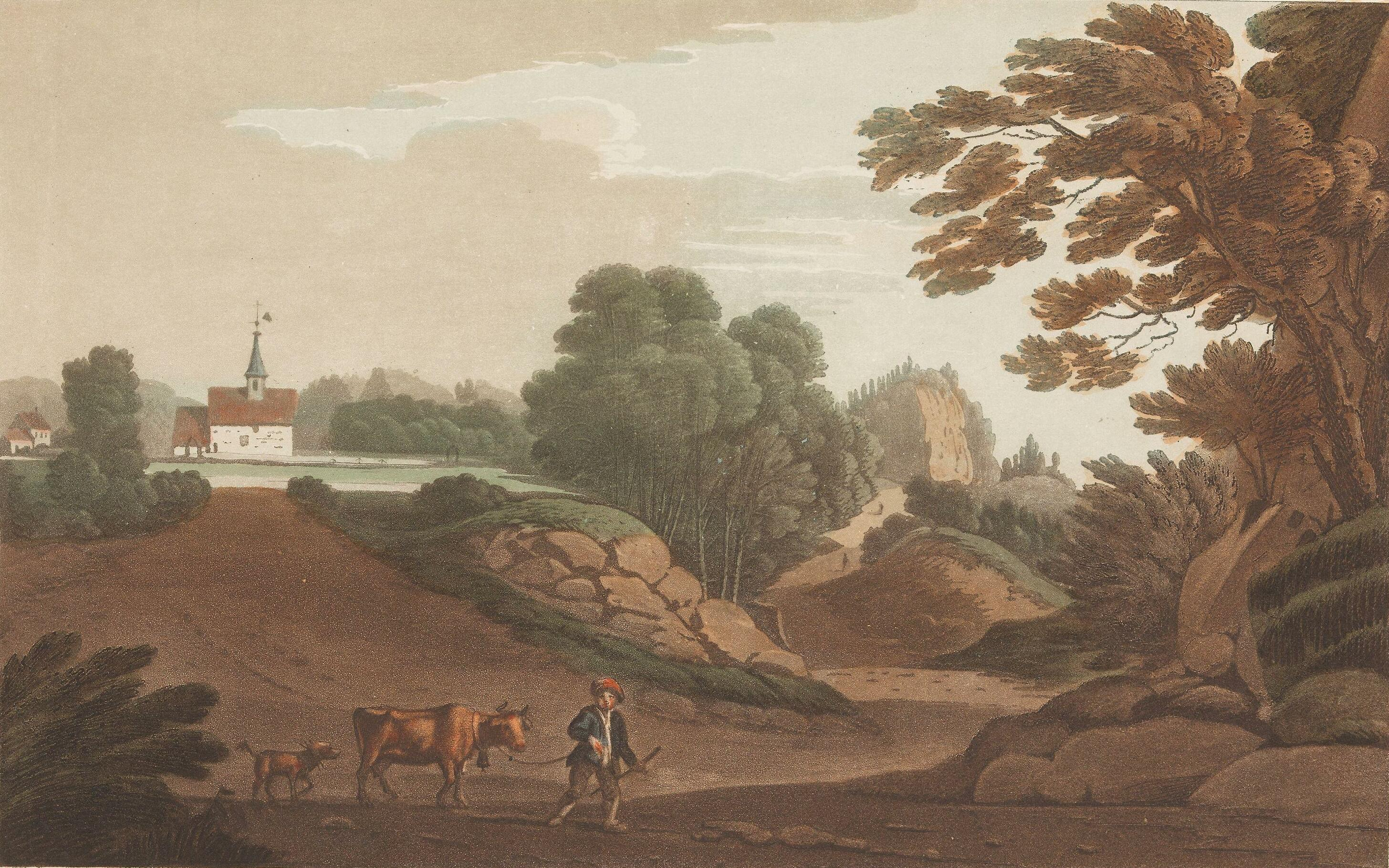
- Painting of the village church (c. 1810)
- Interactive map of Bamble
- Coordinates: 59.00945°N 9.66396°E
- Country: Norway
- Region: Eastern Norway
- County: Telemark
- District: Grenland
- Municipality: Bamble Municipality
- Elevation: 23 m (75 ft)
- Time zone: UTC+01:00 (CET)
  - Summer (DST): UTC+02:00 (CEST)
- Post Code: 3967 Stathelle

Bamble is a village in Bamble Municipality in Telemark county, Norway. The village is located about 1 kilometre (0.62 mi) to the south of the European route E18 highway, about 5 kilometres (3.1 mi) to the southwest of the town of Stathelle and about 10 kilometres (6.2 mi) to the northeast of the village of Botten. Bamble Church is located in the village.
