= Thorium =

Thorium, _{90}Th
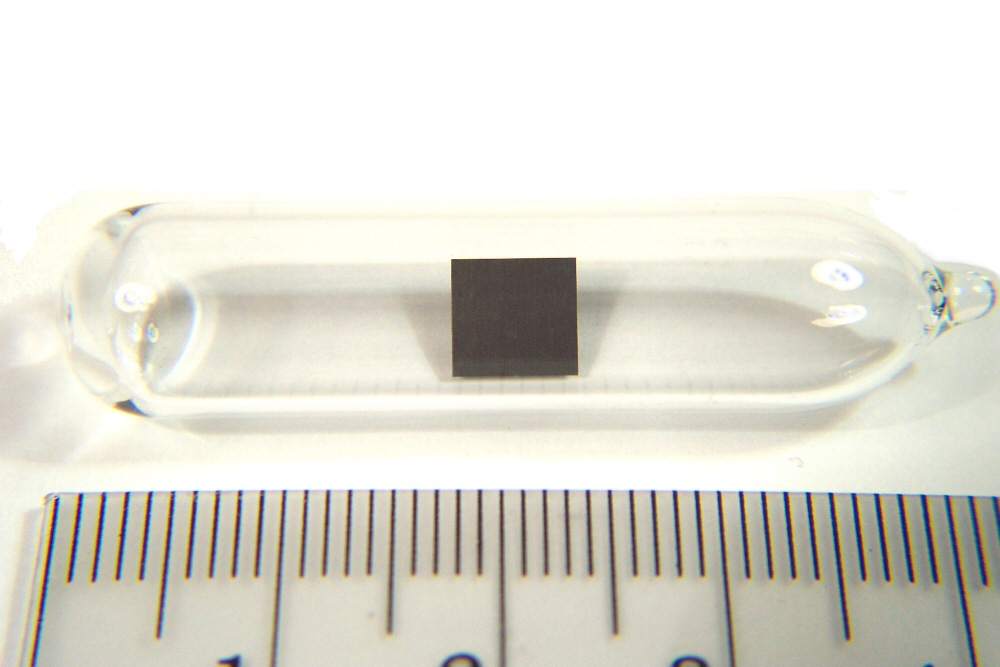
- A thin square of thorium metal in a glass ampoule

Thorium
- Pronunciation: /ˈθɔːriəm/ (THOR-ee-əm)
- Appearance: silvery

Standard atomic weight A_{r}°(Th)
- 232.0377±0.0004; 232.04±0.01 (abridged)

Thorium in the periodic table
Hydrogen																															Helium
Lithium	Beryllium																									Boron	Carbon	Nitrogen	Oxygen	Fluorine	Neon
Sodium	Magnesium																									Aluminium	Silicon	Phosphorus	Sulfur	Chlorine	Argon
Potassium	Calcium															Scandium	Titanium	Vanadium	Chromium	Manganese	Iron	Cobalt	Nickel	Copper	Zinc	Gallium	Germanium	Arsenic	Selenium	Bromine	Krypton
Rubidium	Strontium															Yttrium	Zirconium	Niobium	Molybdenum	Technetium	Ruthenium	Rhodium	Palladium	Silver	Cadmium	Indium	Tin	Antimony	Tellurium	Iodine	Xenon
Caesium	Barium	Lanthanum	Cerium	Praseodymium	Neodymium	Promethium	Samarium	Europium	Gadolinium	Terbium	Dysprosium	Holmium	Erbium	Thulium	Ytterbium	Lutetium	Hafnium	Tantalum	Tungsten	Rhenium	Osmium	Iridium	Platinum	Gold	Mercury (element)	Thallium	Lead	Bismuth	Polonium	Astatine	Radon
Francium	Radium	Actinium	Thorium	Protactinium	Uranium	Neptunium	Plutonium	Americium	Curium	Berkelium	Californium	Einsteinium	Fermium	Mendelevium	Nobelium	Lawrencium	Rutherfordium	Dubnium	Seaborgium	Bohrium	Hassium	Meitnerium	Darmstadtium	Roentgenium	Copernicium	Nihonium	Flerovium	Moscovium	Livermorium	Tennessine	Oganesson
Ce
↑
Th
↓
(Ubb)
actinium ← thorium → protactinium
- Atomic number (Z): 90
- Group: f-block groups (no number)
- Period: period 7
- Block: f-block
- Electron configuration: [Rn] 6d^{2} 7s^{2}
- Electrons per shell: 2, 8, 18, 32, 18, 10, 2

Physical properties
- Phase at STP: solid
- Melting point: 2023 K (1750 °C, 3182 °F)
- Boiling point: 5061 K (4788 °C, 8650 °F)
- Density (at 20° C): 11.725 g/cm^{3}
- Heat of fusion: 13.81 kJ/mol
- Heat of vaporisation: 514 kJ/mol
- Molar heat capacity: 26.230 J/(mol·K)
- Specific heat capacity: 113.041 J/(kg·K)
Vapour pressure
P (Pa)	1	10	100	1 k	10 k	100 k
at T (K)	2633	2907	3248	3683	4259	5055

Atomic properties
- Oxidation states: common: +4 −1, +1, +2, +3
- Electronegativity: Pauling scale: 1.3
- Ionisation energies: 1st: 587 kJ/mol; 2nd: 1110 kJ/mol; 3rd: 1930 kJ/mol
- Atomic radius: empirical: 179.8 pm
- Covalent radius: 206±6 pm
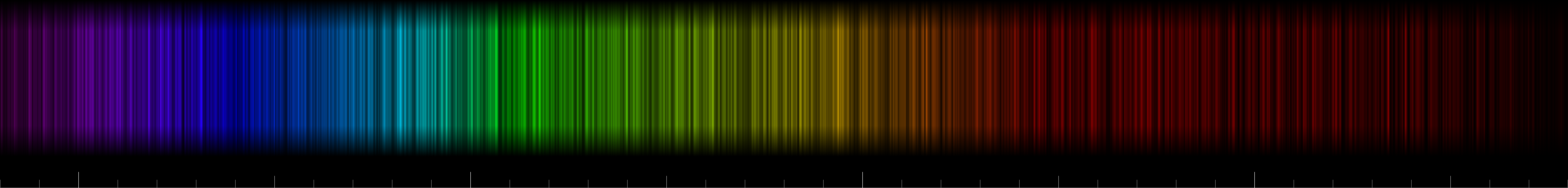
- Spectral lines of thorium

Other properties
- Natural occurrence: primordial
- Crystal structure: face-centred cubic (fcc) (cF4)
- Lattice constant: a = 508.45 pm (at 20 °C)
- Thermal expansion: 11.54×10^{−6}/K (at 20 °C)
- Thermal conductivity: 54.0 W/(m⋅K)
- Electrical resistivity: 157 nΩ⋅m (at 0 °C)
- Magnetic ordering: paramagnetic
- Molar magnetic susceptibility: 132.0×10^{−6} cm^{3}/mol (293 K)
- Young's modulus: 79 GPa
- Shear modulus: 31 GPa
- Bulk modulus: 54 GPa
- Speed of sound thin rod: 2490 m/s (at 20 °C)
- Poisson ratio: 0.27
- Mohs hardness: 3.0
- Vickers hardness: 295–685 MPa
- Brinell hardness: 390–1500 MPa
- CAS Number: 7440-29-1

History
- Naming: after Thor, the Norse god of thunder
- Discovery: Jöns Jakob Berzelius (1829)

Isotopes of thorium
Main isotopes			Decay	
Isotope	abundance	half-life (t_{1/2})	mode	product
^{227}Th	(unstable)	18.693 d	α	^{223}Ra
^{228}Th	(unstable)	1.9125 y	α	^{224}Ra
^{229}Th	(unstable)	7916 y	α	^{225}Ra
^{230}Th	0.02%	75400 y	α	^{226}Ra
^{231}Th	(unstable)	25.52 h	β^{−}	^{231}Pa
^{232}Th	99.98%	1.40×10^{10} y	α	^{228}Ra
^{233}Th	(unstable)	21.83 min	β^{−}	^{233}Pa
^{234}Th	(unstable)	24.11 d	β^{−}	^{234}Pa

Thorium is a chemical element; it has symbol Th and atomic number 90. Thorium is a weakly radioactive light silver metal which tarnishes olive grey when it is exposed to air, forming thorium dioxide; it is moderately soft, malleable, and has a high melting point. Thorium is an electropositive actinide whose chemistry is dominated by the +4 oxidation state; it is quite reactive and can ignite in air when finely divided.

All known thorium isotopes are unstable. The most stable isotope, ^{232}Th, has a half-life of 14.0 billion years, or about the age of the universe; it decays very slowly via alpha decay, starting a decay chain named the thorium series that ends at stable ^{208}Pb. On Earth, thorium and uranium are the only elements with no stable or nearly-stable isotopes that still occur naturally in large quantities as primordial elements. (Note: Bismuth is very slightly radioactive, but its half-life (about 2×10^{19} years) is so long that its decay is negligible even over geological timespans.) Thorium is estimated to be over three times as abundant as uranium in the Earth's crust, and is chiefly refined from monazite sands as a by-product of extracting rare-earth elements.

Thorium was discovered in 1828 by the Swedish chemist Jöns Jacob Berzelius during his analysis of a new mineral found by Morten Thrane Esmark in Norway on Løvøya island near Brevik in the Langesund fjord. He named it after Thor, the Norse god of thunder and war. Its first applications were developed in the late 19th century. Thorium's radioactivity was widely acknowledged during the first decades of the 20th century. In the second half of the 20th century, thorium was replaced in many uses due to concerns about its radioactive properties.

Thorium is still used as an alloying element in TIG welding electrodes but is slowly being replaced in the field with different compositions. It was also material in high-end optics and scientific instrumentation, used in some broadcast vacuum tubes, and as the light source in gas mantles, but these uses have become marginal. It has been suggested as a replacement for uranium as nuclear fuel in nuclear reactors, and several thorium reactors have been built. Thorium is also used in strengthening magnesium, coating tungsten wire in electrical and welding equipment, controlling the grain size of tungsten in electric lamps, high-temperature crucibles, and glasses including camera and scientific instrument lenses. Other uses for thorium include heat-resistant ceramics, aircraft engines, and in light bulbs. Ocean science has used ^{231}Pa/^{230}Th isotope ratios to understand the ancient ocean.

== Bulk properties ==
Thorium is a moderately soft, paramagnetic, bright silvery radioactive actinide metal that can be bent or shaped. In the periodic table, it lies to the right of actinium, to the left of protactinium, and below cerium. Pure thorium is very ductile and, as normal for metals, can be cold-rolled, swaged, and drawn. At room temperature, thorium metal has a face-centred cubic crystal structure; it has two other forms, one at high temperature (over 1360 °C; body-centred cubic) and one at high pressure (around 100 GPa; body-centred tetragonal).

Thorium metal has a bulk modulus (a measure of resistance to compression of a material) of 54 GPa, about the same as tin's (58.2 GPa). Aluminium's is 75.2 GPa; copper's is 137.8 GPa; and mild steel's is 160–169 GPa. Thorium is about as hard as soft steel, so when heated it can be rolled into sheets and pulled into wire.

Thorium is nearly half as dense as uranium and plutonium and is harder than both. Thorium has a magnetic susceptibility of 0.412 × 4π × 10^{−9} m^{3} kg^{−1} at room temperature. This susceptibility is mostly temperature-independent, however impurities and dopants can affect this value. It becomes superconductive below 1.4 K (−271.75 °C). Thorium's melting point of 1750 °C is above both those of actinium (1227 °C) and protactinium (1568 °C). At the start of period 7, from francium to thorium, the melting points of the elements increase (as in other periods), because the number of delocalised electrons each atom contributes increases from one in francium to four in thorium, leading to greater attraction between these electrons and the metal ions as their charge increases from one to four. After thorium, there is a new downward trend in melting points from thorium to plutonium, where the number of f-electrons increases from about 0.4 to about 6: this trend is due to the increasing hybridisation of the 5f and 6d orbitals and the formation of directional bonds resulting in more complex crystal structures and weakened metallic bonding. (The f-electron count for thorium metal is a non-integer due to a 5f–6d overlap.) Among the actinides up to californium, which can be studied in at least milligram quantities, thorium has the highest melting and boiling points and second-lowest density; only actinium is lighter. Thorium's boiling point of 4,788 °C (5,061 K) is the fifth-highest among all the elements with known boiling points. (Note: Behind osmium, tantalum, tungsten, and rhenium; higher boiling points are speculated to be found in the 6d transition metals, but they have not been produced in large enough quantities to test this prediction.)

The properties of thorium vary widely depending on the degree of impurities in the sample. The major impurity is usually thorium dioxide (ThO_{2}); even the purest thorium specimens usually contain about a tenth of a per cent of the dioxide. Experimental measurements of its density give values between 11.5 and 11.66 g/cm^{3}: these are slightly lower than the theoretically expected value of 11.7 g/cm^{3} calculated from thorium's lattice parameters, perhaps due to microscopic voids forming in the metal when it is cast. These values lie between those of its neighbours actinium (10.1 g/cm^{3}) and protactinium (15.4 g/cm^{3}), part of a trend across the early actinides.

Thorium can form alloys with many other metals. Addition of small proportions of thorium improves the mechanical strength of magnesium, and thorium–aluminium alloys have been considered as a way to store thorium in proposed future thorium nuclear reactors. Thorium forms eutectic mixtures with chromium and uranium, and it is completely miscible in both solid and liquid states with its lighter congener cerium.

== Isotopes ==
There are seven naturally occurring isotopes of thorium but none are stable. ^{232}Th is the only isotope of thorium occurring in quantity in nature; its half-life is 14.0 billion years, about three times the age of the Earth, and slightly longer than the age of the universe, and longest of all nuclides heavier than bismuth. Its stability is attributed to its closed nuclear subshell with 142 neutrons. Thorium has a characteristic terrestrial isotopic composition, with atomic weight 232.0377±0.0004. It is one of only four radioactive elements (along with bismuth, protactinium and uranium) that occur in large enough quantities on Earth for a standard atomic weight to be determined.

Thorium nuclei are susceptible to alpha decay because the strong nuclear force cannot overcome the electromagnetic repulsion between their protons. The alpha decay of ^{232}Th initiates the 4n decay chain, or thorium series, which includes isotopes with a mass number divisible by 4. This chain of consecutive alpha and beta decays begins with the decay of ^{232}Th to ^{228}Ra and terminates at ^{208}Pb. Any sample of thorium or its compounds contains traces of these daughters, which are isotopes of thallium, lead, bismuth, polonium, radon, radium, and actinium. Natural thorium samples can be chemically purified to extract useful daughter nuclides, such as ^{212}Pb, which is used in nuclear medicine for cancer therapy. ^{227}Th (alpha emitter, 18.693 days half-life) can also be used in cancer treatments such as targeted alpha therapies. ^{232}Th also very occasionally undergoes spontaneous fission rather than alpha decay, but at a much lower rate than uranium-238 and all natural fission products and evidence come predominantly from it. Its partial half-life for this process is very long at over 10^{21} years.

The 4n decay chain of ^{232}Th, commonly called the "thorium series"

In total, 32 radioisotopes have been characterised, which range in mass number from 207 to 238. After ^{232}Th, the most stable of them (with respective half-lives) are ^{230}Th (75,400 years), ^{229}Th (7,916 years), ^{228}Th (1.91 years), ^{234}Th (24.11 days), and ^{227}Th (18.693 days). All of these isotopes occur in nature as trace radioisotopes due to their presence in the decay chains of ^{232}Th, ^{235}U, ^{238}U, and ^{237}Np: the last of these is long extinct in nature due to its short half-life (2.14 million years), but is continually produced in minute traces from neutron capture in uranium ores. ^{233}Th (half-life 22 minutes) occurs naturally as the result of neutron activation of natural ^{232}Th.

In deep seawaters the isotope ^{230}Th constitutes up to 0.02% of total thorium. This is because its parent uranium is generally soluble in the ocean, but ^{232}Th is nearly insoluble and is precipitated; thus the isotopes continually produced from uranium is relatively enriched. For this reason International Union of Pure and Applied Chemistry (IUPAC) reclassified thorium as a binuclidic element in 2013; it had formerly been considered a mononuclidic element.

Thorium has a nuclear isomer, ^{229m}Th, having the lowest known excitation energy of any isomer, measured to be 7.6±0.5 eV. This is so low that when it undergoes isomeric transition, the emitted gamma radiation is in the ultraviolet range. (Note: Gamma rays are distinguished by their origin in the nucleus, not their wavelength; hence there is no lower limit to gamma energy derived from radioactive decay.) The nuclear transition from ^{229}Th to ^{229m}Th is being investigated for a nuclear clock.

Different isotopes of thorium are chemically identical, but have slightly differing physical properties: for example, the densities of pure ^{228}Th, ^{229}Th, ^{230}Th, and ^{232}Th are respectively expected to be 11.5, 11.6, 11.6, and 11.7 g/cm^{3}. The isotope ^{229}Th is fissionable and the bare critical mass of estimated at 2839 kg, although with steel reflectors this value would drop to 994 kg. (Note: A fissionable nuclide is capable of undergoing fission (even with a low probability) after capturing a high-energy neutron. Some of these nuclides can be induced to fission with low-energy thermal neutrons with a high probability; they are referred to as fissile. A fertile nuclide is one that could be bombarded with neutrons to produce a fissile nuclide. Critical mass is the mass of a ball of a material which could undergo a sustained nuclear chain reaction.) ^{232}Th is not fissionable, but it is fertile as it can be converted to fissile ^{233}U by neutron capture and subsequent beta decay.

=== Radiometric dating ===
Two radiometric dating methods involve thorium isotopes: uranium–thorium dating, based on the decay of ^{234}U to ^{230}Th, and ionium–thorium dating, which measures the ratio of ^{232}Th to ^{230}Th. (Note: The name ionium for ^{230}Th is a remnant from a period when different isotopes were not recognised to be the same element and were given different names.) These rely on the fact that ^{232}Th is a primordial radioisotope, but ^{230}Th only occurs as an intermediate decay product in the decay chain of ^{238}U. Uranium–thorium dating is a relatively short-range process because of the short half-lives of ^{234}>U and ^{230}Th relative to the age of the Earth: it is also accompanied by a sister process involving the alpha decay of ^{235}U into ^{231}Th, which very quickly becomes the longer-lived ^{231}Pa, and this process is often used to check the results of uranium–thorium dating. Uranium–thorium dating is commonly used to determine the age of calcium carbonate materials such as speleothem or coral, because uranium is more soluble in water than thorium and protactinium, which are selectively precipitated into ocean-floor sediments, where their ratios are measured. The scheme has a range of several hundred thousand years. Ionium–thorium dating is a related process, which exploits the insolubility of thorium (both ^{232}Th and ^{230}Th) and thus its presence in ocean sediments to date these sediments by measuring the ratio of ^{232}Th to ^{230}Th. Both of these dating methods assume that the proportion of ^{230}Th to ^{232}Th is a constant during the period when the sediment layer was formed, that the sediment did not already contain thorium before contributions from the decay of uranium, and that the thorium cannot migrate within the sediment layer. The two methods are largely complementary as uranium-thorium assumes the sample contained only uranium originally; ionium-thorium, that it contained only thorium.

== Chemistry ==
A thorium atom has 90 electrons, of which four are valence electrons. Four atomic orbitals are theoretically available for the valence electrons to occupy: 5f, 6d, 7s, and 7p. The 7p orbitals are not occupied in the ground state of thorium, however, due to being greatly destabilized. Despite thorium's position in the f-block of the periodic table, it has an anomalous [Rn]6d^{2}7s^{2} electron configuration in the ground state, as the 5f and 6d subshells in the early actinides are very close in energy, even more so than the 4f and 5d subshells of the lanthanides: thorium's 6d subshells are lower in energy than its 5f subshells, because its 5f subshells are not well-shielded by the filled 6s and 6p subshells and are destabilised. This is due to relativistic effects, which become stronger near the bottom of the periodic table, specifically the relativistic spin–orbit interaction. The closeness in energy levels of the 5f, 6d, and 7s energy levels of thorium results in thorium almost always losing all four valence electrons and occurring in its highest possible oxidation state of +4. This is different from its lanthanide congener cerium, in which +4 is also the highest possible state, but +3 plays an important role and is more stable. Thorium complexes in the trivalent and divalent oxidation states are known, however. Thorium is much more similar to the transition metals zirconium and hafnium than to cerium in its ionization energies and redox potentials, and hence also in its chemistry: this transition-metal-like behaviour is the norm in the first half of the actinide series, from actinium to americium.

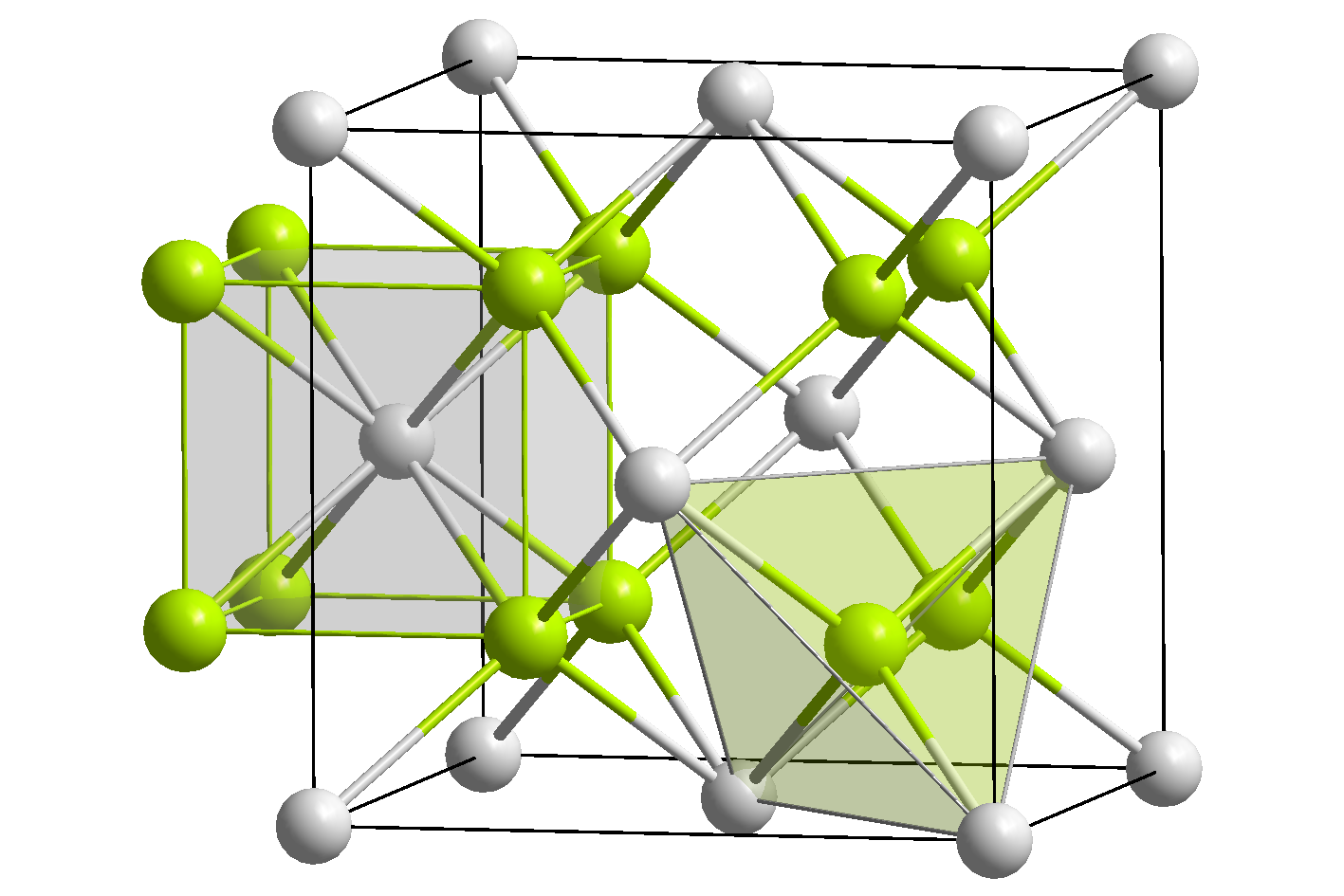
Thorium dioxide has the fluorite crystal structure. Th^{4+}: __ / O^{2−}: __

Despite the anomalous electron configuration for gaseous thorium atoms, metallic thorium shows significant 5f involvement. A hypothetical metallic state of thorium that had the [Rn]6d^{2}7s^{2} configuration with the 5f orbitals above the Fermi level should be hexagonal close packed like the group 4 elements titanium, zirconium, and hafnium, and not face-centred cubic as it actually is. The actual crystal structure can only be explained when the 5f states are invoked, proving that thorium is metallurgically a true actinide.

Tetravalent thorium compounds are usually colourless or yellow, like those of silver or lead, as the Th^{4+} ion has no 5f or 6d electrons. Thorium chemistry is therefore largely that of an electropositive metal forming a single diamagnetic ion with a stable noble-gas configuration, indicating a similarity between thorium and the main group elements of the s-block. (Note: Unlike the previous similarity between the actinides and the transition metals, the main-group similarity largely ends at thorium before being resumed in the second half of the actinide series, because of the growing contribution of the 5f orbitals to covalent bonding. The only other commonly-encountered actinide, uranium, retains some echoes of main-group behaviour. The chemistry of uranium is more complicated than that of thorium, but the two most common oxidation states of uranium are uranium(VI) and uranium(IV); these are two oxidation units apart, with the higher oxidation state corresponding to formal loss of all valence electrons, which is similar to the behaviour of the heavy main-group elements in the p-block.) Thorium and uranium are the most investigated of the radioactive elements because their radioactivity is low enough not to require special handling in the laboratory.

=== Reactivity ===
Thorium is a highly reactive and electropositive metal. With a standard reduction potential of −1.90 V for the Th^{4+}/Th couple, it is somewhat more electropositive than zirconium or aluminium. Finely divided thorium metal can exhibit pyrophoricity, spontaneously igniting in air. When heated in air, thorium turnings ignite and burn with a brilliant white light to produce the dioxide. In bulk, the reaction of pure thorium with air is slow, although corrosion may occur after several months; most thorium samples are contaminated with varying degrees of the dioxide, which greatly accelerates corrosion. Such samples slowly tarnish, becoming grey and finally black at the surface.

At standard temperature and pressure, thorium is slowly attacked by water, but does not readily dissolve in most common acids, with the exception of hydrochloric acid, where it dissolves leaving a black insoluble residue of ThO(OH,Cl)H. It dissolves in concentrated nitric acid containing a small quantity of catalytic fluoride or fluorosilicate ions; if these are not present, passivation by the nitrate can occur, as with uranium and plutonium.

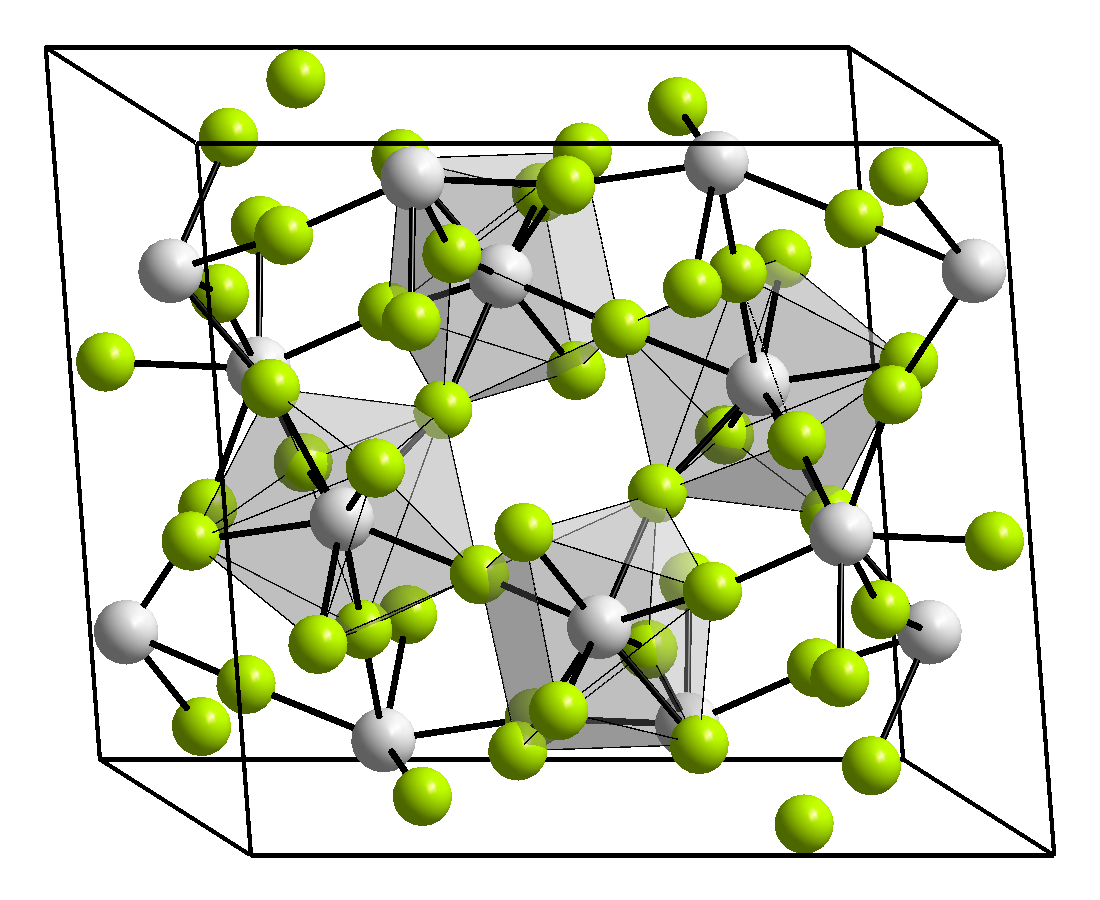
Crystal structure of thorium tetrafluoride Th^{4+}: __ / F^{−}: __

=== Inorganic compounds ===
Most binary compounds of thorium with nonmetals may be prepared by heating the elements together. In air, thorium burns to form ThO_{2}, which has the fluorite structure. Thorium dioxide is a refractory material, with the highest melting point (3,390 °C (3,660 K)) of any known oxide. It is somewhat hygroscopic and reacts readily with water and many gases; it dissolves easily in concentrated nitric acid in the presence of fluoride.

When heated in air, thorium dioxide emits intense blue light; the light becomes white when ThO_{2} is mixed with its lighter homologue cerium dioxide (CeO_{2}, ceria): this is the basis for its previously common application in gas mantles. A flame is not necessary for this effect: in 1901, it was discovered that a hot Welsbach gas mantle (using ThO_{2} with 1% CeO_{2}) remained at "full glow" when exposed to a cold unignited mixture of flammable gas and air. The mantle can also be heated electrically to produce light. The light emitted by thorium dioxide is higher in wavelength than the blackbody emission expected from incandescence at the same temperature, an effect called candoluminescence. It occurs because ThO_{2} : Ce acts as a catalyst for the recombination of free radicals that appear in high concentration in a flame, whose deexcitation releases large amounts of energy. The addition of 1% cerium dioxide, as in gas mantles, heightens the effect by increasing emissivity in the visible region of the spectrum; but because cerium, unlike thorium, can occur in multiple oxidation states, its charge and hence visible emissivity will depend on the region on the flame it is found in (as such regions vary in their chemical composition and hence how oxidising or reducing they are).

Several binary thorium chalcogenides and oxychalcogenides are also known with sulfur, selenium, and tellurium.

All four thorium tetrahalides are known, as are some low-valent bromides and iodides: the tetrahalides are all 8-coordinated hygroscopic compounds that dissolve easily in polar solvents such as water. Many related polyhalide ions are also known. Thorium tetrafluoride has a monoclinic crystal structure like those of zirconium tetrafluoride and hafnium tetrafluoride, where the Th^{4+} ions are coordinated with F^{−} ions in somewhat distorted square antiprisms. The other tetrahalides instead have dodecahedral geometry. Lower iodides ThI_{3} (black) and ThI_{2} (gold-coloured) can also be prepared by reducing the tetraiodide with thorium metal: they do not contain Th(III) and Th(II), but instead contain Th^{4+} and could be more clearly formulated as electride compounds. Many polynary halides with the alkali metals, barium, thallium, and ammonium are known for thorium fluorides, chlorides, and bromides. For example, when treated with potassium fluoride and hydrofluoric acid, Th^{4+} forms the complex anion [ThF_{6}]^{2−} (hexafluorothorate(IV)), which precipitates as an insoluble salt, K_{2}[ThF_{6}] (potassium hexafluorothorate(IV)).

Thorium borides, carbides, silicides, and nitrides are refractory materials, like those of uranium and plutonium, and have thus received attention as possible nuclear fuels. All four heavier pnictogens (phosphorus, arsenic, antimony, and bismuth) also form binary thorium compounds. Thorium germanides are also known. Thorium reacts with hydrogen to form the thorium hydrides ThH_{2} and Th_{4}H_{15}, the latter of which is superconducting below 7.5–8 K; at standard temperature and pressure, it conducts electricity like a metal. The hydrides are thermally unstable and readily decompose upon exposure to air or moisture.

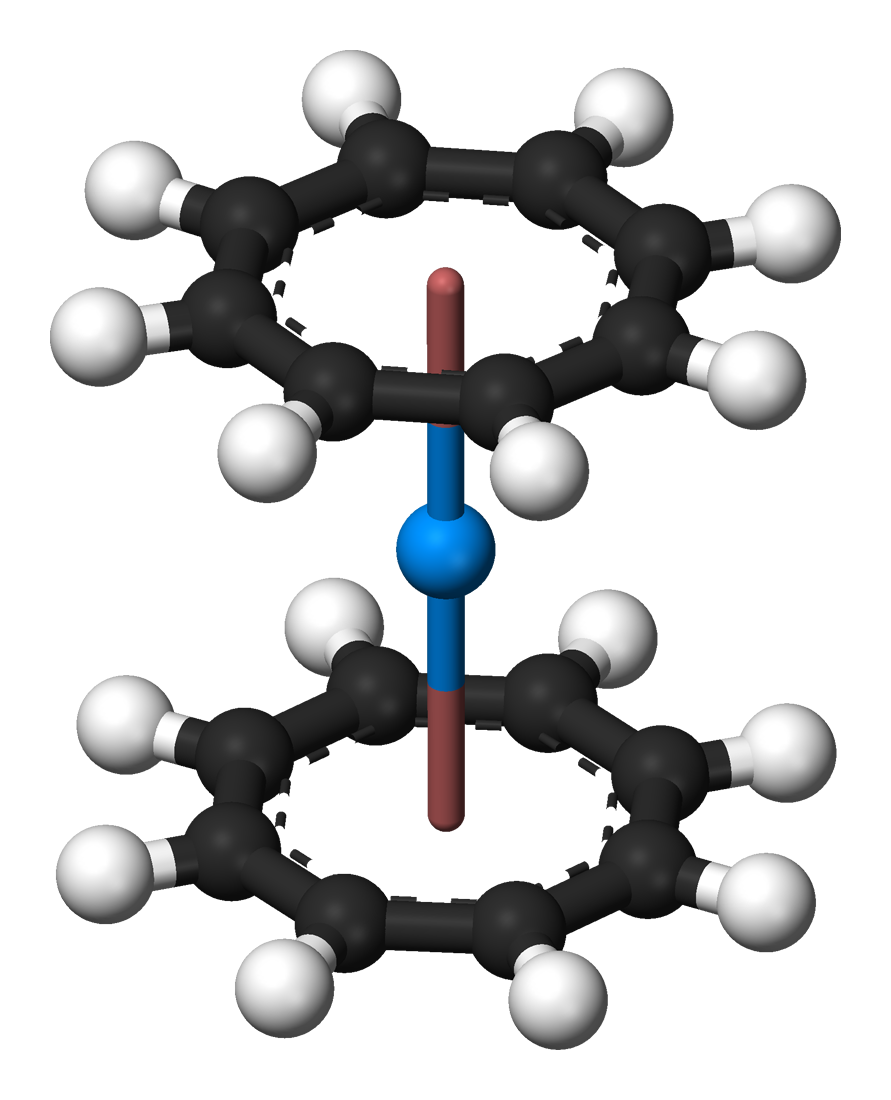
Sandwich molecule structure of thorocene

=== Coordination compounds ===
In an acidic aqueous solution, thorium occurs as the tetrapositive aqua ion [Th(H_{2}O)_{9}]^{4+}, which has tricapped trigonal prismatic molecular geometry: at pH < 3, the solutions of thorium salts are dominated by this cation. The Th^{4+} ion is the largest of the tetrapositive actinide ions, and depending on the coordination number can have a radius between 0.95 and 1.14 Å. It is quite acidic due to its high charge, slightly stronger than sulfurous acid: thus it tends to undergo hydrolysis and polymerisation (though to a lesser extent than Fe^{3+}), predominantly to [Th_{2}(OH)_{2}]^{6+} in solutions with pH 3 or below, but in more alkaline solution polymerisation continues until the gelatinous hydroxide Th(OH)_{4} forms and precipitates out (though equilibrium may take weeks to be reached, because the polymerisation usually slows down before the precipitation). As a hard Lewis acid, Th^{4+} favours hard ligands with oxygen atoms as donors: complexes with sulfur atoms as donors are less stable and are more prone to hydrolysis.

High coordination numbers are the rule for thorium due to its large size. Thorium nitrate pentahydrate was the first known example of coordination number 11, the oxalate tetrahydrate has coordination number 10, and the borohydride (first prepared in the Manhattan Project) has coordination number 14. These thorium salts are known for their high solubility in water and polar organic solvents.

Many other inorganic thorium compounds with polyatomic anions are known, such as the perchlorates, sulfates, sulfites, nitrates, carbonates, phosphates, vanadates, molybdates, and chromates, and their hydrated forms. They are important in thorium purification and the disposal of nuclear waste, but most of them have not yet been fully characterised, especially regarding their structural properties. For example, thorium nitrate is produced by reacting thorium hydroxide with nitric acid: it is soluble in water and alcohols and is an important intermediate in the purification of thorium and its compounds. Thorium complexes with organic ligands, such as oxalate, citrate, and EDTA, are much more stable. In natural thorium-containing waters, organic thorium complexes usually occur in concentrations orders of magnitude higher than the inorganic complexes, even when the concentrations of inorganic ligands are much greater than those of organic ligands.

Piano-stool molecule structure of (η^{8}-C_{8}H_{8})ThCl_{2}(THF)_{2}

In January 2021, the aromaticity has been observed in a large metal cluster anion consisting of 12 bismuth atoms stabilised by a centre thorium cation. This compound was shown to be surprisingly stable, unlike many previous known aromatic metal clusters.

=== Organothorium compounds ===
Most of the work on organothorium compounds has focused on the cyclopentadienyl complexes and cyclooctatetraenyls. Like many of the early and middle actinides (up to americium, and also expected for curium), thorium forms a cyclooctatetraenide complex: the yellow Th(C_{8}H_{8})_{2}, thorocene. It is isotypic with the better-known analogous uranium compound uranocene. It can be prepared by reacting K_{2}C_{8}H_{8} with thorium tetrachloride in tetrahydrofuran (THF) at the temperature of dry ice, or by reacting thorium tetrafluoride with MgC_{8}H_{8}. It is unstable in air and decomposes in water or at 190 °C. Half sandwich compounds are also known, such as (η^{8}-C_{8}H_{8})ThCl_{2}(THF)_{2}, which has a piano-stool structure and is made by reacting thorocene with thorium tetrachloride in tetrahydrofuran.

The simplest of the cyclopentadienyls are Th(C_{5}H_{5})_{3} and Th(C_{5}H_{5})_{4}: many derivatives are known. The former (which has two forms, one purple and one green) is a rare example of thorium in the formal +3 oxidation state; a formal +2 oxidation state occurs in a derivative. The chloride derivative [Th(C_{5}H_{5})_{3}Cl] is prepared by heating thorium tetrachloride with limiting KC_{5}H_{5} used (other univalent metal cyclopentadienyls can also be used). The alkyl and aryl derivatives are prepared from the chloride derivative and have been used to study the nature of the Th–C sigma bond.

Other organothorium compounds are not well-studied. Tetraallylthorium, Th(CH_{2}CH=CH_{2})_{4}, is known, but its structures has not been determined. The molecular structure of tetrabenzylthorium, Th(CH_{2}C_{6}H_{5})_{4}, without ancillary ligands has been reported. They decompose slowly at room temperature. Thorium forms the monocapped trigonal prismatic anion [Th(CH_{3})_{7}]^{3−}, heptamethylthorate(IV), which forms the salt [Li(tmeda)]_{3}[Th(CH_{3})_{7}] (tmeda = (CH_{3})_{2}NCH_{2}CH_{2}N(CH_{3})_{2}). Although one methyl group is only attached to the thorium atom (Th–C distance 257.1 pm) and the other six connect the lithium and thorium atoms (Th–C distances 265.5–276.5 pm), they behave equivalently in solution. Tetramethylthorium, Th(CH_{3})_{4}, is not known, but its adducts are stabilised by phosphine ligands.

== Occurrence ==
=== Formation ===
^{232}Th is a primordial nuclide formed in the r-process, which probably occurs in supernovae and neutron star mergers. These violent events scattered it across the galaxy. The letter "r" stands for "rapid neutron capture", and occurs in core-collapse supernovae, where heavy seed nuclei such as ^{56}Fe rapidly capture neutrons, running up against the neutron drip line, as neutrons are captured much faster than the resulting nuclides can beta decay back toward stability. Neutron capture is the only way for stars to synthesise elements beyond iron because of the increased Coulomb barriers that make interactions between charged particles difficult at high atomic numbers and the fact that fusion beyond ^{56}Fe is endothermic. Because of the abrupt loss of stability past ^{209}Bi, the r-process is the only process of stellar nucleosynthesis that can create thorium and uranium; all other processes are too slow and the intermediate nuclei alpha decay before they capture enough neutrons to reach these elements.

=== Abundance ===
In the universe, thorium is among the rarest of the primordial elements at rank 77th in cosmic abundance because it is one of the two elements that can be produced only in the r-process (the other being uranium), and also because it has slowly been decaying away from the moment it formed. The only primordial elements rarer than thorium are thulium, lutetium, tantalum, and rhenium, the odd-numbered elements just before the third peak of r-process abundances around the heavy platinum group metals, as well as uranium. (Note: An even number of either protons or neutrons generally increases nuclear stability of isotopes, compared to isotopes with odd numbers. Elements with odd atomic numbers have no more than two stable isotopes; even-numbered elements have multiple stable isotopes, with tin (element 50) having ten.) In the distant past the abundances of thorium and uranium were enriched by the decay of plutonium and curium isotopes, and thorium was enriched relative to uranium by the decay of ^{236}U to ^{232}Th and the natural depletion of ^{235}U, but these sources have long since decayed and no longer contribute.

In the Earth's crust, thorium is much more abundant: with an abundance of 8.1 g/tonne, it is one of the most abundant of the heavy elements, almost as abundant as lead (13 g/tonne) and more abundant than tin (2.1 g/tonne). This is because thorium is likely to form oxide minerals that do not sink into the core; it is classified as a lithophile under the Goldschmidt classification, meaning that it is generally found combined with oxygen. Common thorium compounds are also poorly soluble in water. Thus, even though the refractory elements have the same relative abundances in the Earth as in the Solar System as a whole, there is more accessible thorium than heavy platinum group metals in the crust.

The radiogenic heat from the decay of ^{232}Th (violet) is a major contributor to the earth's internal heat budget. Of the four major nuclides providing this heat, ^{232}Th has grown to provide the most heat as the other ones decayed faster than thorium.

=== On Earth ===
Natural thorium is usually almost pure ^{232}Th, which is the longest-lived and most stable isotope of thorium, having a half-life comparable to the age of the universe. Its radioactive decay is the largest single contributor to the Earth's internal heat; the other major contributors are the shorter-lived primordial radionuclides, which are ^{238}U, ^{40}K, and ^{235}U in descending order of their contribution. (At the time of the Earth's formation, ^{40}K and ^{235}U contributed much more by virtue of their short half-lives, but they have decayed more quickly, leaving the contribution from ^{232}Th and ^{238}U predominant.) Its decay accounts for a gradual decrease of thorium content of the Earth: the planet currently has around 80% of the amount present at the formation of the Earth. The other natural thorium isotopes are much shorter-lived; of them, only ^{230}Th is usually detectable, occurring in secular equilibrium with its parent ^{238}U, and making up at most 0.04% of natural thorium. (Note: Other isotopes may occur alongside ^{232}Th, but only in trace quantities. If the source contains no uranium, the only other thorium isotope present would be ^{228}Th, which occurs in the decay chain of ^{232}Th (the thorium series): the ratio of ^{228}Th to ^{232}Th would be under 10^{−10}. If uranium is present, tiny traces of several other isotopes will also be present: ^{231}Th and ^{227}Th from the decay chain of ^{235}U (the actinium series), and slightly larger but still tiny traces of ^{234}Th and ^{230}Th from the decay chain of ^{238}U (the uranium series). ^{229}Th is also been produced in the decay chain of ^{237}Np (the neptunium series): all primordial ^{237}Np is extinct, but it is still produced as a result of nuclear reactions in uranium ores. ^{229}Th is mostly produced as a daughter of artificial ^{233}U made by neutron irradiation of ^{232}Th, and is extremely rare in nature.)

Thorium only occurs as a minor constituent of most minerals, and was for this reason previously thought to be rare. In fact, it is the 37th most abundant element in the Earth's crust with an abundance of 12 parts per million. In nature, thorium occurs in the +4 oxidation state, together with uranium(IV), zirconium(IV), hafnium(IV), and cerium(IV), and also with scandium, yttrium, and the trivalent lanthanides which have similar ionic radii. Because of thorium's radioactivity, minerals containing it are often metamict (amorphous), their crystal structure having been damaged by the alpha radiation produced by thorium. An extreme example is ekanite, (Ca,Fe,Pb)_{2}(Th,U)Si_{8}O_{20}, which almost never occurs in nonmetamict form due to the thorium it contains.

Monazite (chiefly phosphates of various rare-earth elements) is the most important commercial source of thorium because it occurs in large deposits worldwide, principally in India, South Africa, Brazil, Australia, and Malaysia and is mined for its rare earth content. It contains around 2.5% thorium on average, although some deposits may contain up to 20%. Monazite is a chemically unreactive mineral that is found as yellow or brown sand; its low reactivity makes it difficult to extract thorium from it. Allanite (chiefly silicates-hydroxides of various metals) can have 0.1–2% thorium and zircon (chiefly zirconium silicate, ZrSiO_{4}) up to 0.4% thorium.

Thorium dioxide occurs as the rare mineral thorianite. Due to its being isotypic with uranium dioxide, these two common actinide dioxides can form solid-state solutions and the name of the mineral changes according to the ThO_{2} content. (Note: Thorianite refers to minerals with 75–100 mol% ThO_{2}; uranothorianite, 25–75 mol% ThO_{2}; thorian uraninite, 15–25 mol% ThO_{2}; uraninite, 0–15 mol% ThO_{2}.) Thorite (chiefly thorium silicate, ThSiO_{4}), also has a high thorium content and is the mineral in which thorium was first discovered. In thorium silicate minerals, the Th^{4+} and SiO_{4}^{4−} ions are often replaced with M^{3+} (where M = Sc, Y, or Ln) and phosphate (PO_{4}^{3−}) ions respectively. Because of the great insolubility of thorium dioxide, thorium does not usually spread quickly through the environment when released. The Th^{4+} ion is soluble, especially in acidic soils, and in such conditions the thorium concentration can be higher.

== History ==
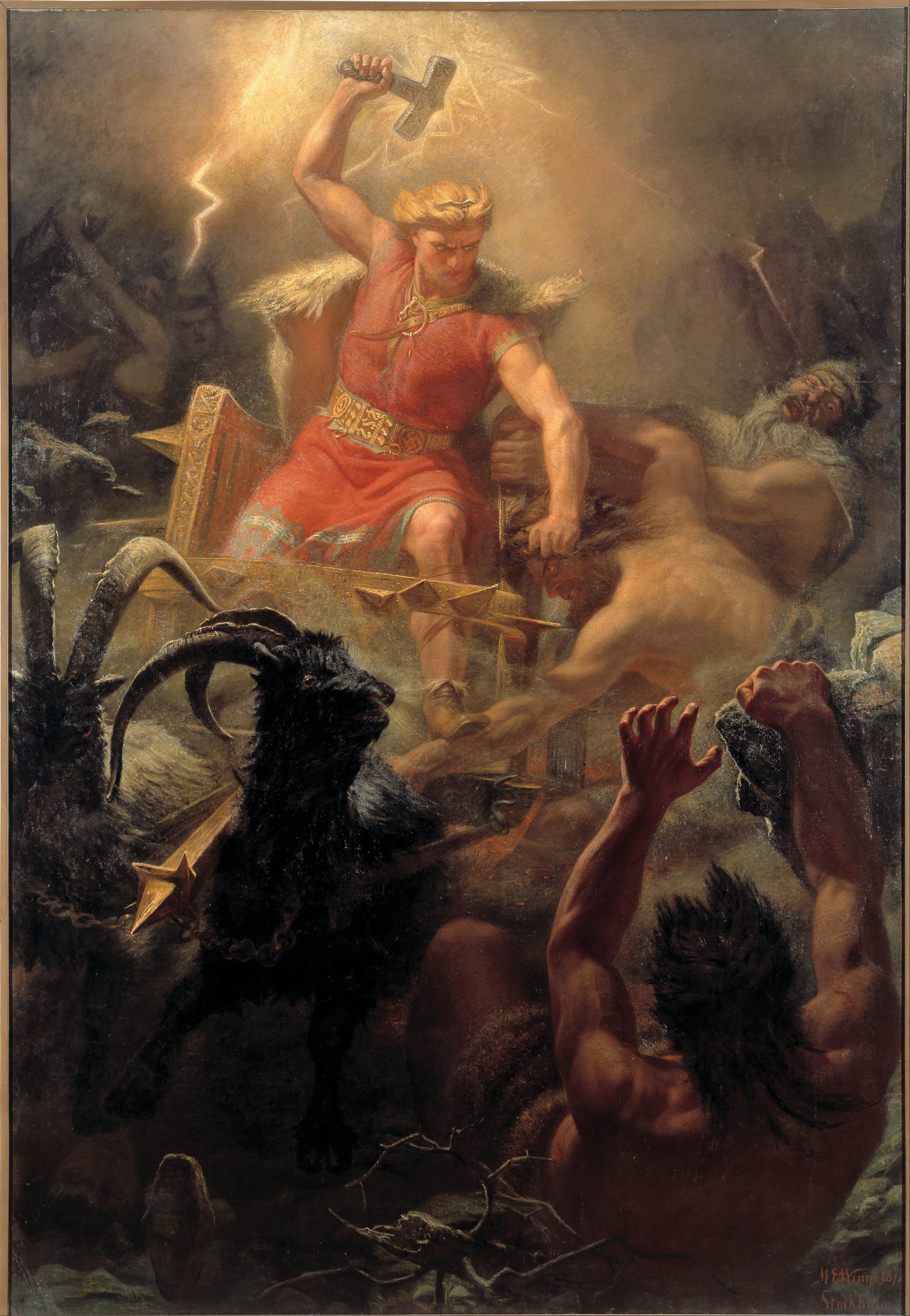
Thor's Fight with the Giants (1872) by Mårten Eskil Winge; Thor, the Norse god of thunder, raising his hammer Mjölnir in a battle against the giants.

=== Erroneous report ===
In 1815, the Swedish chemist Jöns Jacob Berzelius analysed an unusual sample of gadolinite from a copper mine in Falun, central Sweden. He noted impregnated traces of a white mineral, which he cautiously assumed to be an earth (oxide in modern chemical nomenclature) of an unknown element. Berzelius had already discovered two elements, cerium and selenium, but he had made a public mistake once, announcing a new element, gahnium, that turned out to be zinc oxide. Berzelius privately named the putative element "thorium" in 1817 and its supposed oxide "thorina" after Thor, the Norse god of thunder. In 1824, after more deposits of the same mineral in Vest-Agder, Norway, were discovered, he retracted his findings, as the mineral (later named xenotime) proved to be mostly yttrium orthophosphate.

=== Discovery ===
In 1828, Morten Thrane Esmark found a black mineral on Løvøya island, Telemark county, Norway. He was a Norwegian priest and amateur mineralogist who studied the minerals in Telemark, where he served as vicar. He commonly sent the most interesting specimens, such as this one, to his father, Jens Esmark, a noted mineralogist and professor of mineralogy and geology at the Royal Frederick University in Christiania (today called Oslo). The elder Esmark determined that it was not a known mineral and sent a sample to Berzelius for examination. Berzelius determined that it contained a new element. He published his findings in 1829, having isolated an impure sample by reducing K[ThF_{5}] (potassium pentafluorothorate(IV)) with potassium metal. Berzelius reused the name of the previous supposed element discovery and named the source mineral thorite.

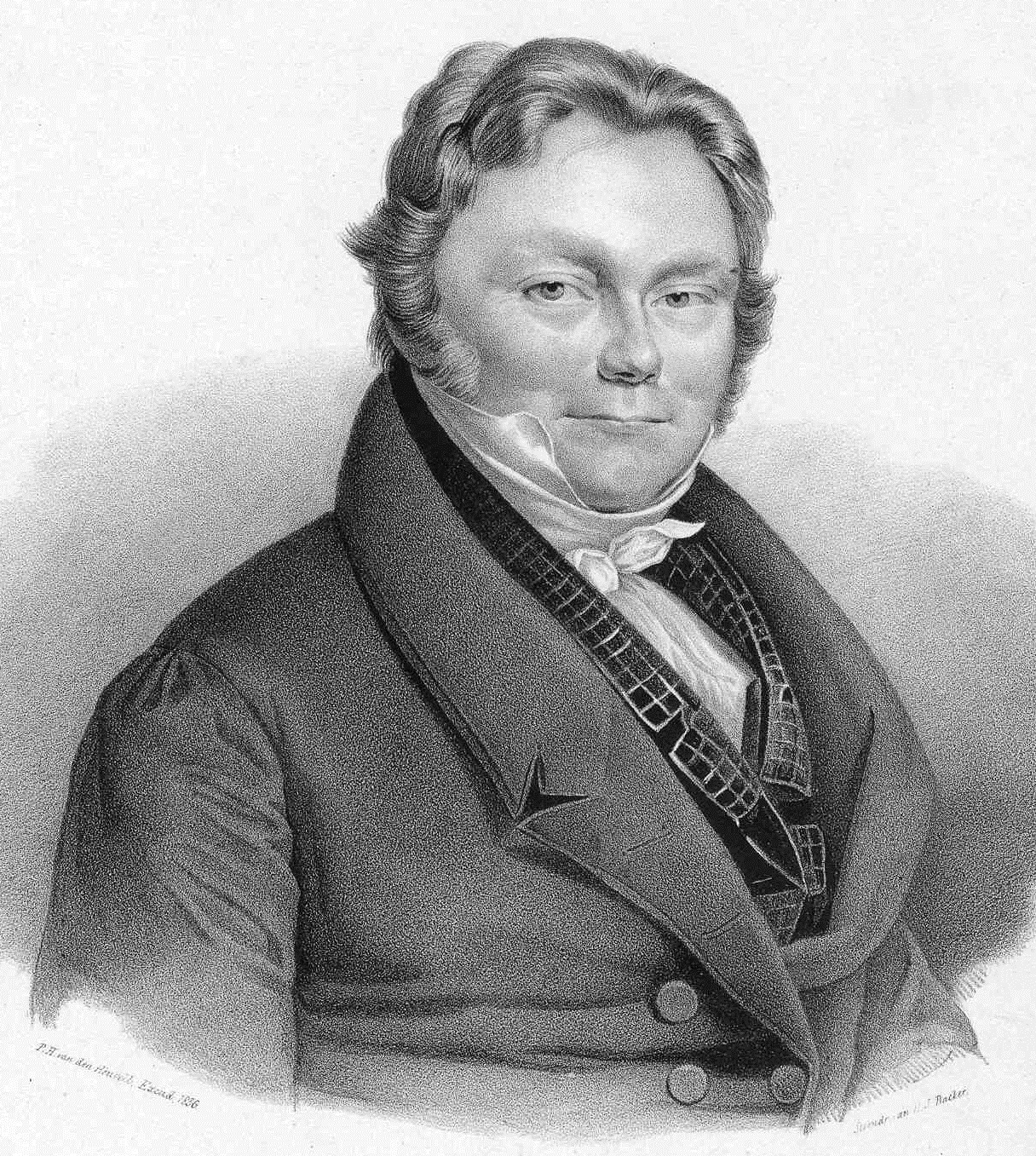
Jöns Jacob Berzelius, who first identified thorium as a new element

Berzelius made some initial characterisations of the new metal and its chemical compounds: he correctly determined that the thorium–oxygen mass ratio of thorium oxide was 7.5 (its actual value is close to that, ~7.3), but he assumed the new element was divalent rather than tetravalent, and so calculated that the atomic mass was 7.5 times that of oxygen (120 Da); it is actually 15 times as large. (Note: At the time, the rare-earth elements, among which thorium was found and with which it is closely associated in nature, were thought to be divalent; the rare earths were given atomic weight values two-thirds of their actual ones, and thorium and uranium are given values half of the actual ones.) He determined that thorium was a very electropositive metal, ahead of cerium and behind zirconium in electropositivity. Metallic thorium was isolated for the first time in 1914 by Dutch entrepreneurs Dirk Lely Jr. and Lodewijk Hamburger. (Note: The main difficulty in isolating thorium lies not in its chemical electropositivity, but in the close association of thorium in nature with the rare-earth elements and uranium, which collectively are difficult to separate from each other. Swedish chemist Lars Fredrik Nilson, the discoverer of scandium, had previously made an attempt to isolate thorium metal in 1882, but was unsuccessful at achieving a high degree of purity. Lely and Hamburger obtained 99% pure thorium metal by reducing thorium chloride with sodium metal. A simpler method leading to even higher purity was discovered in 1927 by American engineers John Marden and Harvey Rentschler, involving the reduction of thorium oxide with calcium in presence of calcium chloride.)

=== Initial chemical classification ===
In the periodic table published by Dmitri Mendeleev in 1869, thorium and the rare-earth elements were placed outside the main body of the table, at the end of each vertical period after the alkaline earth metals. This reflected the belief at that time that thorium and the rare-earth metals were divalent. With the later recognition that the rare earths were mostly trivalent and thorium was tetravalent, Mendeleev moved cerium and thorium to group IV in 1871, which also contained the modern carbon group (group 14) and titanium group (group 4), because their maximum oxidation state was +4. Cerium was soon removed from the main body of the table and placed in a separate lanthanide series; thorium was left with group 4 as it had similar properties to its supposed lighter congeners in that group, such as titanium and zirconium. (Note: Thorium also appears in the 1864 table by British chemist John Newlands as the last and heaviest element, as it was initially thought that uranium was a trivalent element with an atomic weight of around 120: this is half of its actual value, since uranium is predominantly hexavalent. It also appears as the heaviest element in the 1864 table by British chemist William Odling under titanium, zirconium, and tantalum. It does not appear in the periodic systems published by French geologist Alexandre-Émile Béguyer de Chancourtois in 1862, German-American musician Gustav Hinrichs in 1867, or German chemist Julius Lothar Meyer in 1870, all of which exclude the rare earths and thorium.)

=== First uses ===
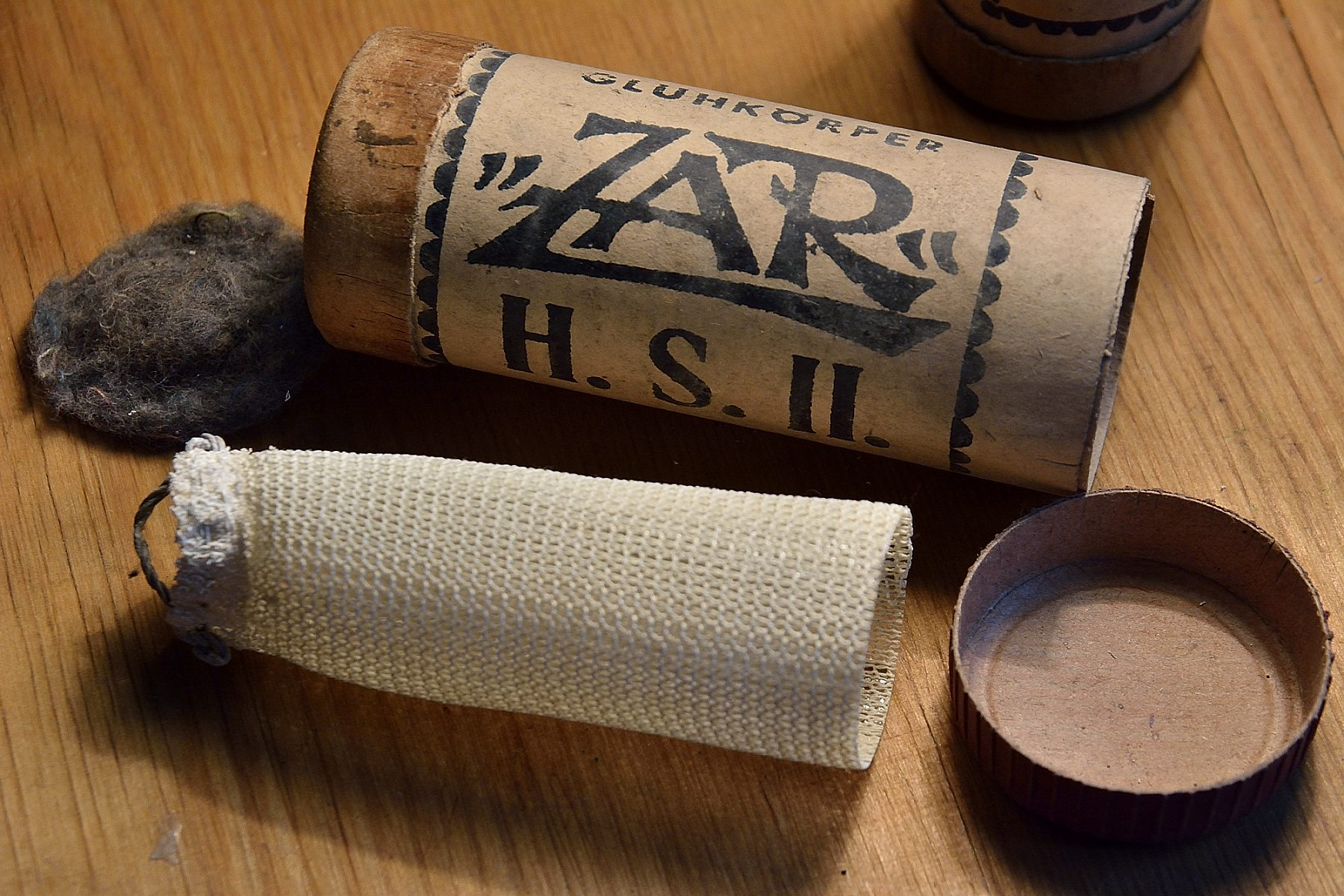
World War II thorium dioxide gas mantle

While thorium was discovered in 1828 its first application dates only from 1885, when Austrian chemist Carl Auer von Welsbach invented the gas mantle, a portable source of light which produces light from the incandescence of thorium oxide when heated by burning gaseous fuels. Many applications were subsequently found for thorium and its compounds, including ceramics, carbon arc lamps, heat-resistant crucibles, and as catalysts for industrial chemical reactions such as the oxidation of ammonia to nitric acid.

=== Radioactivity ===
Thorium was first observed to be radioactive in 1898, by the German chemist Gerhard Carl Schmidt and later that year, independently, by the Polish-French physicist Marie Curie. It was the second element that was found to be radioactive, after the 1896 discovery of radioactivity in uranium by French physicist Henri Becquerel. Starting from 1899, the New Zealand physicist Ernest Rutherford and the American electrical engineer Robert Bowie Owens studied the radiation from thorium; initial observations showed that it varied significantly. It was determined that these variations came from a short-lived gaseous daughter of thorium, which they found to be a new element. This element is now named radon, the only one of the rare radioelements to be discovered in nature as a daughter of thorium rather than uranium.

After accounting for the contribution of radon, Rutherford, now working with the British physicist Frederick Soddy, showed how thorium decayed at a fixed rate over time into a series of other elements in work dating from 1900 to 1903. This observation led to the identification of the half-life as one of the outcomes of the alpha particle experiments that led to the disintegration theory of radioactivity. The biological effect of radiation was discovered in 1903. The newly discovered phenomenon of radioactivity excited scientists and the general public alike. In the 1920s, thorium's radioactivity was promoted as a cure for rheumatism, diabetes, and sexual impotence. In 1932, most of these uses were banned in the United States after a federal investigation into the health effects of radioactivity. 10,000 individuals in the United States had been injected with thorium during X-ray diagnosis; they were later found to suffer health issues such as leukaemia and abnormal chromosomes. Public interest in radioactivity had declined by the end of the 1930s.

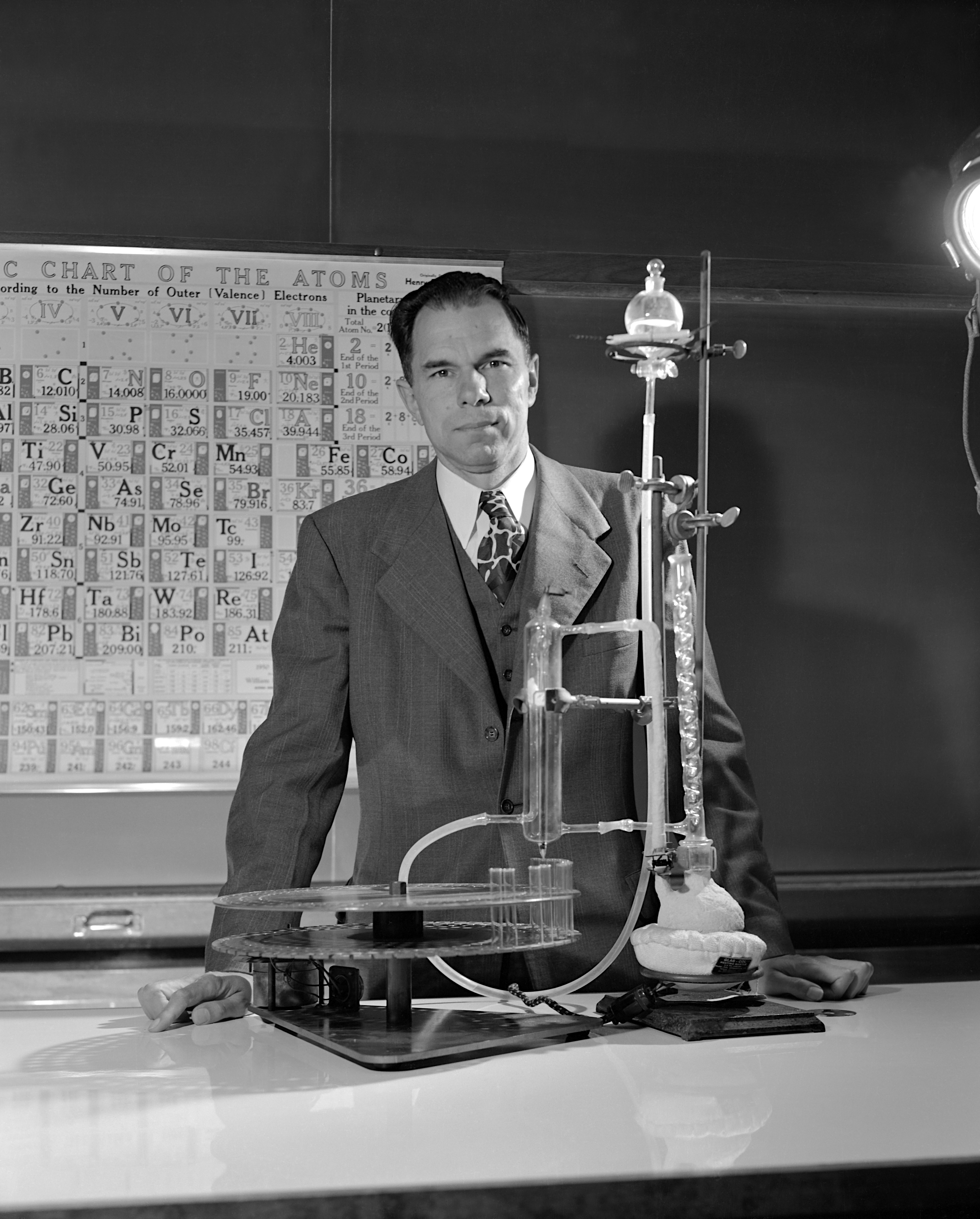
Glenn T. Seaborg, who settled thorium's location in the f-block

=== Further classification ===
Up to the late 19th century, chemists unanimously agreed that thorium and uranium were the heaviest members of group 4 and group 6 respectively; the existence of the lanthanides in the sixth row was considered to be a one-off fluke. In 1892, British chemist Henry Bassett postulated a second extra-long periodic table row to accommodate known and undiscovered elements, considering thorium and uranium to be analogous to the lanthanides. In 1913, Danish physicist Niels Bohr published a theoretical model of the atom and its electron orbitals, which soon gathered wide acceptance. The model indicated that the seventh row of the periodic table should also have f-shells filling before the d-shells that were filled in the transition elements, like the sixth row with the lanthanides preceding the 5d transition metals. The existence of a second inner transition series, in the form of the actinides, was not accepted until similarities with the electron structures of the lanthanides had been established; Bohr suggested that the filling of the 5f orbitals may be delayed to after uranium.

It was only with the discovery of the first transuranic elements, which from plutonium onward have dominant +3 and +4 oxidation states like the lanthanides, that it was realised that the actinides were indeed filling f-orbitals rather than d-orbitals, with the transition-metal-like chemistry of the early actinides being the exception and not the rule. In 1945, when American physicist Glenn T. Seaborg and his team had discovered the transuranic elements americium and curium, he proposed the actinide concept, realising that thorium was the second member of an f-block actinide series analogous to the lanthanides, instead of being the heavier congener of hafnium in a fourth d-block row. (Note: The filling of the 5f subshell from the beginning of the actinide series was confirmed when the 6d elements were reached in the 1960s, proving that the 4f and 5f series are of equal length. Lawrencium has only +3 as an oxidation state, breaking from the trend of the late actinides towards the +2 state; it thus fits as a heavier congener of lutetium. Even more importantly, the next element, rutherfordium, was found to behave like hafnium and show only a +4 state. Today, thorium's similarities to hafnium are still sometimes acknowledged by calling it a "pseudo group 4 element".)

=== Phasing out ===
In the 1990s, most applications that do not depend on thorium's radioactivity declined quickly due to safety and environmental concerns as suitable safer replacements were found. Despite its radioactivity, the element has remained in use for applications where no suitable alternatives could be found. A 1981 study by the Oak Ridge National Laboratory in the United States estimated that using a thorium gas mantle every weekend would be safe for a person, but this was not the case for the dose received by people manufacturing the mantles or for the soils around some factory sites. Some manufacturers have changed to other materials, such as yttrium. As recently as 2007, some companies continued to manufacture and sell thorium mantles without giving adequate information about their radioactivity, with some even falsely claiming them to be non-radioactive.

=== Nuclear power ===
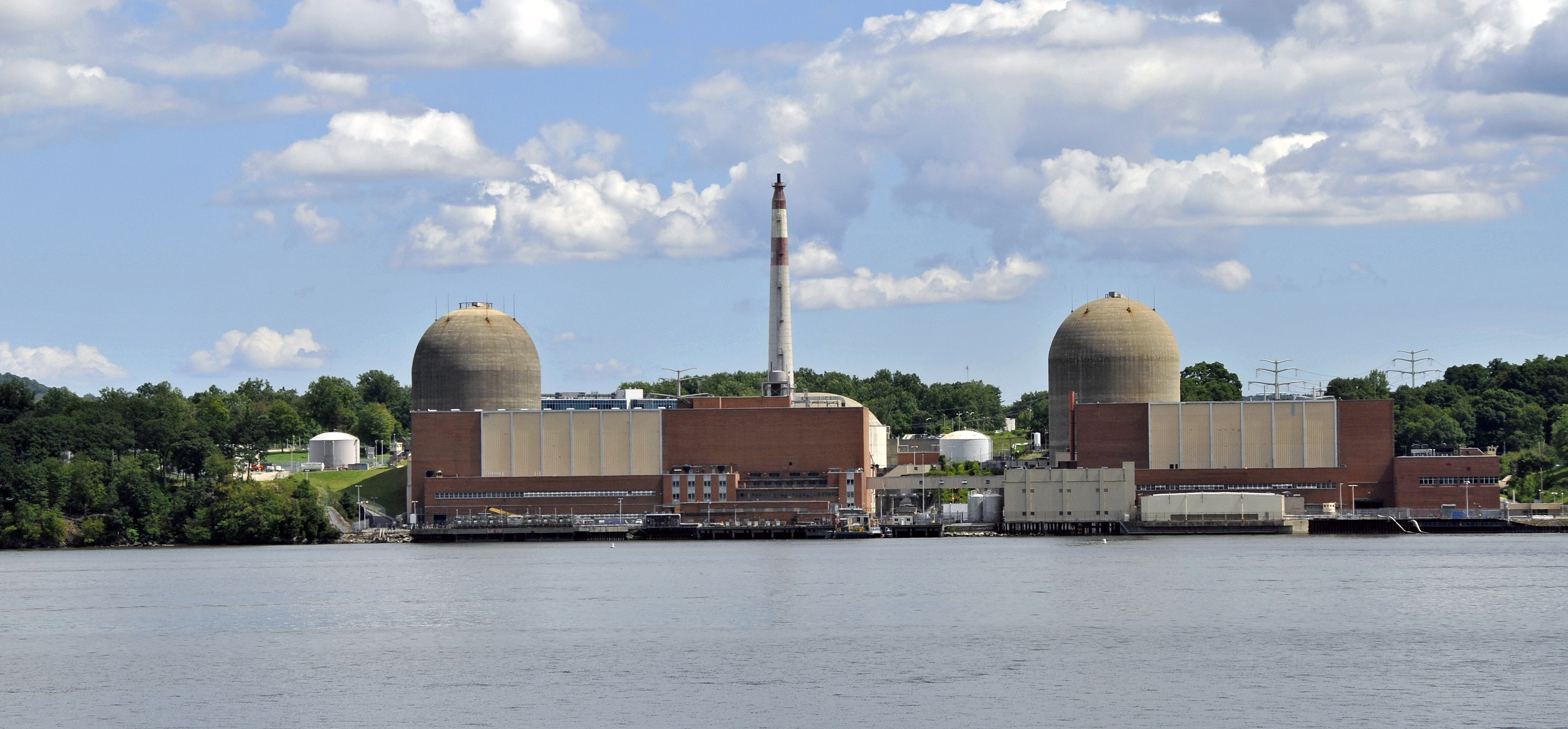
The Indian Point Energy Center (Buchanan, New York, United States), home of the world's first thorium reactor

Thorium has been used as a power source on a prototype scale. The earliest thorium-based reactor was built at the Indian Point Energy Center located in Buchanan, New York, United States in 1962. China may be the first to have attempted to commercialise the technology. The country with the largest estimated reserves of thorium in the world is India, which has sparse reserves of uranium. In the 1950s, India targeted achieving energy independence with their three-stage nuclear power programme. In most countries, uranium was relatively abundant and the progress of thorium-based reactors was slow; in the 20th century, three reactors were built in India and twelve elsewhere. Large-scale research was begun in 1996 by the International Atomic Energy Agency to study the use of thorium reactors; a year later, the United States Department of Energy started their research. Alvin Radkowsky of Tel Aviv University in Israel was the head designer of Shippingport Atomic Power Station in Pennsylvania, the first American civilian reactor to breed thorium. He founded a consortium to develop thorium reactors, which included other laboratories: Raytheon Nuclear Inc. and Brookhaven National Laboratory in the United States, and the Kurchatov Institute in Russia.

In the 21st century, thorium's potential for reducing nuclear proliferation and its waste characteristics led to renewed interest in the thorium fuel cycle. India has projected meeting as much as 30% of its electrical demands through thorium-based nuclear power by 2050. In February 2014, Bhabha Atomic Research Centre (BARC), in Mumbai, India, presented their latest design for a "next-generation nuclear reactor" that burns thorium as its fuel core, calling it the Advanced Heavy Water Reactor (AHWR). In 2009, the chairman of the Indian Atomic Energy Commission said that India has a "long-term objective goal of becoming energy-independent based on its vast thorium resources."

On 16 June 2023 China's National Nuclear Safety Administration issued a licence to the Shanghai Institute of Applied Physics (SINAP) of the Chinese Academy of Sciences to begin operating the TMSR-LF1, 2 MWt liquid fuel thorium-based molten salt experimental reactor which was completed in August 2021. China is believed to have one of the largest thorium reserves in the world. The exact size of those reserves has not been publicly disclosed, but it is estimated to be enough to meet the country's total energy needs for more than 20,000 years.

=== Nuclear weapons ===
When gram quantities of plutonium were first produced in the Manhattan Project, it was discovered that a minor isotope (^{240}Pu) underwent significant spontaneous fission, which brought into question the viability of a plutonium-fuelled gun-type nuclear weapon. While the Los Alamos team began work on the implosion-type weapon to circumvent this issue, the Chicago team discussed reactor design solutions. Eugene Wigner proposed to use the ^{240}Pu-contaminated plutonium to drive the conversion of thorium into ^{233}U in a special converter reactor. It was hypothesized that the ^{233}U would then be usable in a gun-type weapon, though concerns about contamination from ^{232}U were voiced. Progress on the implosion weapon was sufficient, and this converter was not developed further, but the design had enormous influence on the development of nuclear energy. It was the first detailed description of a highly enriched water-cooled, water-moderated reactor similar to future naval and commercial power reactors.

In 1943 the Manhattan Project contracted two private companies, Union Carbide and Chevron, to quietly compile a survey of uranium and thorium deposits around the world. The primary focus was uranium but early in the process thorium was also included. Deposits of monazite sands were identified in Brazil, Netherlands East Indies, and Travancore in India but none of these were pursued by the project.

During the Cold War the United States explored the possibility of using ^{232}Th as a source of ^{233}U to be used in a nuclear bomb and it fired a test bomb in 1955. It concluded that a ^{233}U-fired bomb would be a very potent weapon, but it bore few sustainable "technical advantages" over the contemporary uranium–plutonium bombs, especially since ^{233}U is difficult to produce in isotopically pure form.

Thorium metal was used in the radiation case of at least one nuclear weapon design deployed by the United States (the W71).

== Production ==
Lower-bound estimates of thorium reserves in thousand tonnes, 2014
Country	Reserves
India	846
Brazil	632
Australia	595
United States	595
Egypt	380
Turkey	374
Venezuela	300
Canada	172
Russia	155
South Africa	148
China	100
Norway	87
Greenland	86
Finland	60
Sweden	50
Kazakhstan	50
Other countries	1725
World total	6355

The low demand makes working mines for extraction of thorium alone not profitable, and it is almost always extracted with the rare earths, which themselves may be by-products of production of other minerals. The current reliance on monazite for production is due to thorium being largely produced as a by-product; other sources such as thorite contain more thorium and could easily be used for production if demand rose. Present knowledge of the distribution of thorium resources is poor, as low demand has led to exploration efforts being relatively minor. In 2014, world production of the monazite concentrate, from which thorium would be extracted, was 2,700 tonnes.

The common production route of thorium constitutes concentration of thorium minerals; extraction of thorium from the concentrate; purification of thorium; and (optionally) conversion to compounds, such as thorium dioxide.

=== Concentration ===
There are two categories of thorium minerals for thorium extraction: primary and secondary. Primary deposits occur in acidic granitic magmas and pegmatites. They are concentrated, but of small size. Secondary deposits occur at the mouths of rivers in granitic mountain regions. In these deposits, thorium is enriched along with other heavy minerals. Initial concentration varies with the type of deposit.

For the primary deposits, the source pegmatites, which are usually obtained by mining, are divided into small parts and then undergo flotation. Alkaline earth metal carbonates may be removed after reaction with hydrogen chloride; then follow thickening, filtration, and calcination. The result is a concentrate with rare-earth content of up to 90%. Secondary materials (such as coastal sands) undergo gravity separation. Magnetic separation follows, with a series of magnets of increasing strength. Monazite obtained by this method can be as pure as 98%.

Industrial production in the 20th century relied on treatment with hot, concentrated sulfuric acid in cast iron vessels, followed by selective precipitation by dilution with water, as on the subsequent steps. This method relied on the specifics of the technique and the concentrate grain size; many alternatives have been proposed, but only one has proven effective economically: alkaline digestion with hot sodium hydroxide solution. This is more expensive than the original method but yields a higher purity of thorium; in particular, it removes phosphates from the concentrate.

==== Acid digestion ====
Acid digestion is a two-stage process, involving the use of up to 93% sulfuric acid at 210–230 °C. First, sulfuric acid in excess of 60% of the sand mass is added, thickening the reaction mixture as products are formed. Then, fuming sulfuric acid is added and the mixture is kept at the same temperature for another five hours to reduce the volume of solution remaining after dilution. The concentration of the sulfuric acid is selected based on reaction rate and viscosity, which both increase with concentration, albeit with viscosity retarding the reaction. Increasing the temperature also speeds up the reaction, but temperatures of 300 °C and above must be avoided, because they cause insoluble thorium pyrophosphate to form. Since dissolution is very exothermic, the monazite sand cannot be added to the acid too quickly. Conversely, at temperatures below 200 °C the reaction does not go fast enough for the process to be practical. To ensure that no precipitates form to block the reactive monazite surface, the mass of acid used must be twice that of the sand, instead of the 60% that would be expected from stoichiometry. The mixture is then cooled to 70 °C and diluted with ten times its volume of cold water, so that any remaining monazite sinks to the bottom while the rare earths and thorium remain in solution. Thorium may then be separated by precipitating it as the phosphate at pH 1.3, since the rare earths do not precipitate until pH 2.

==== Alkaline digestion ====
Alkaline digestion is carried out in 30–45% sodium hydroxide solution at about 140 °C for about three hours. Too high a temperature leads to the formation of poorly soluble thorium oxide and an excess of uranium in the filtrate, and too low a concentration of alkali leads to a very slow reaction. These reaction conditions are rather mild and require monazite sand with a particle size under 45 μm. Following filtration, the filter cake includes thorium and the rare earths as their hydroxides, uranium as sodium diuranate, and phosphate as trisodium phosphate. This crystallises trisodium phosphate decahydrate when cooled below 60 °C; uranium impurities in this product increase with the amount of silicon dioxide in the reaction mixture, necessitating recrystallisation before commercial use. The hydroxides are dissolved at 80 °C in 37% hydrochloric acid. Filtration of the remaining precipitates followed by addition of 47% sodium hydroxide results in the precipitation of thorium and uranium at about pH 5.8. Complete drying of the precipitate must be avoided, as air may oxidise cerium from the +3 to the +4 oxidation state, and the cerium(IV) formed can liberate free chlorine from the hydrochloric acid. The rare earths again precipitate out at higher pH. The precipitates are neutralised by the original sodium hydroxide solution, although most of the phosphate must first be removed to avoid precipitating rare-earth phosphates. Solvent extraction may also be used to separate out the thorium and uranium, by dissolving the resultant filter cake in nitric acid. The presence of titanium hydroxide is deleterious as it binds thorium and prevents it from dissolving fully.

=== Purification ===
High thorium concentrations are needed in nuclear applications. In particular, concentrations of atoms with high neutron capture cross-sections must be very low (for example, gadolinium concentrations must be lower than one part per million by weight). Previously, repeated dissolution and recrystallisation was used to achieve high purity. Today, liquid solvent extraction procedures involving selective complexation of Th^{4+} are used. For example, following alkaline digestion and the removal of phosphate, the resulting nitrato complexes of thorium, uranium, and the rare earths can be separated by extraction with tributyl phosphate in kerosene.

== Modern applications ==
Non-radioactivity-related uses of thorium have been in decline since the 1950s due to environmental concerns largely stemming from the radioactivity of thorium and its decay products.

Most thorium applications use its dioxide (sometimes called "thoria" in the industry), rather than the metal. This compound has a melting point of 3,300 °C (5,970 °F; 3,570 K), the highest of all known oxides; only a few substances have higher melting points. This helps the compound remain solid in a flame, and it considerably increases the brightness of the flame; this is the main reason thorium is used in gas lamp mantles. All substances emit energy (glow) at high temperatures, but the light emitted by thorium is nearly all in the visible spectrum, hence the brightness of thorium mantles.

Energy, some of it in the form of visible light, is emitted when thorium is exposed to a source of energy itself, such as a cathode ray, heat, or ultraviolet light. This effect is shared by cerium dioxide, which converts ultraviolet light into visible light more efficiently, but thorium dioxide gives a higher flame temperature, emitting less infrared light. Thorium in mantles, though still common, has been progressively replaced with yttrium since the late 1990s. According to the 2005 review by the United Kingdom's National Radiological Protection Board, "although [thoriated gas mantles] were widely available a few years ago, they are not any more." Thorium is also used to make cheap permanent negative ion generators, such as in pseudoscientific health bracelets.

During the production of incandescent filaments, recrystallisation of tungsten is significantly lowered by adding small amounts of thorium dioxide to the tungsten sintering powder before drawing the filaments. A small addition of thorium to tungsten thermocathodes considerably reduces the work function of electrons; as a result, electrons are emitted at considerably lower temperatures. Thorium forms a one-atom-thick layer on the surface of tungsten. The work function from a thorium surface is lowered possibly because of the electric field on the interface between thorium and tungsten formed due to thorium's greater electropositivity. Since the 1920s, thoriated tungsten wires have been used in electronic tubes and in the cathodes and anticathodes of X-ray tubes and rectifiers. The reactivity of thorium with atmospheric oxygen required the introduction of an evaporated magnesium layer as a getter for impurities in the evacuated tubes, giving them their characteristic metallic inner coating. The introduction of transistors in the 1950s significantly diminished this use, but not entirely. Vacuum tubes with thoriated filaments may be used in cavity magnetrons. Thorium dioxide is used in gas tungsten arc welding (GTAW) to increase the high-temperature strength of tungsten electrodes and improve arc stability. Thorium oxide is being replaced in this use with other oxides, such as those of zirconium, cerium, and lanthanum.

Thorium dioxide is found in refractory ceramics, such as high-temperature laboratory crucibles, either as the primary ingredient or as an addition to zirconium dioxide. An alloy of 90% platinum and 10% thorium is an effective catalyst for oxidising ammonia to nitrogen oxides, but this has been replaced by an alloy of 95% platinum and 5% rhodium because of its better mechanical properties and greater durability.

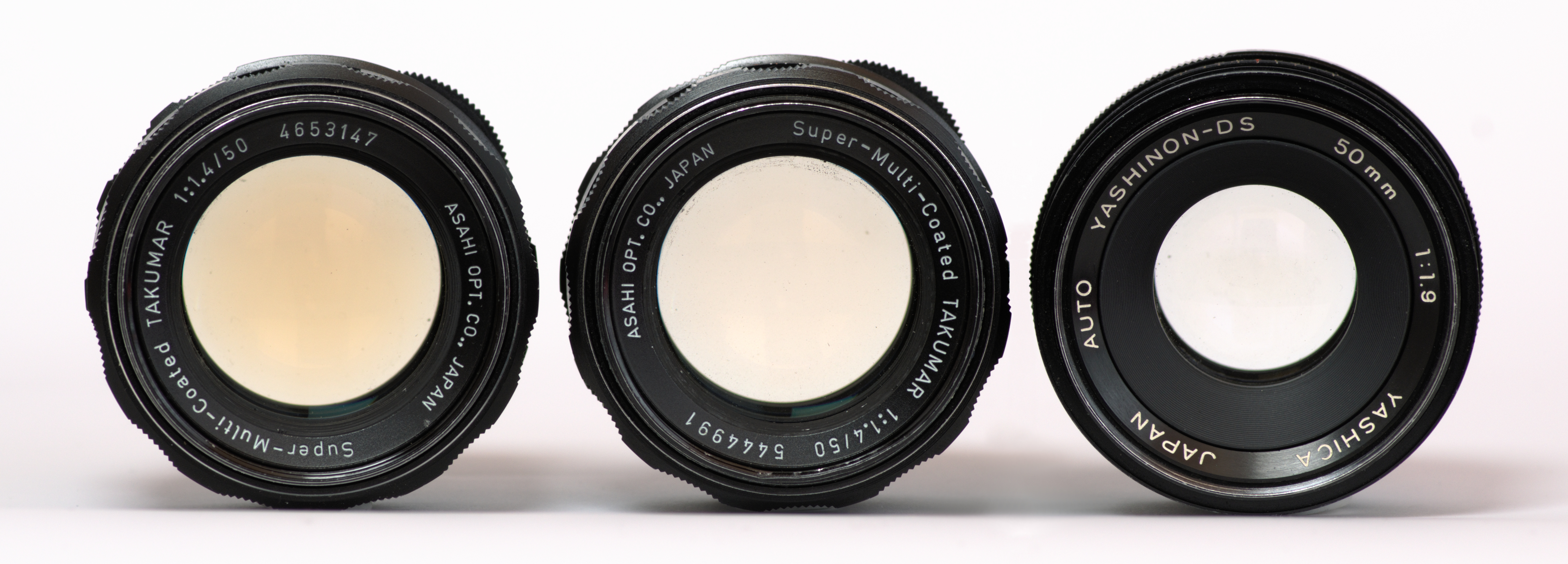
Yellowed thorium dioxide lens (left), a similar lens partially de-yellowed with ultraviolet radiation (centre), and lens without yellowing (right)

When added to glass, thorium dioxide helps increase its refractive index and decrease dispersion. Such glass finds application in high-quality lenses for cameras and scientific instruments. The radiation from these lenses can darken them and turn them yellow over a period of years and it degrades film, but the health risks are minimal. Yellowed lenses may be restored to their original colourless state by lengthy exposure to intense ultraviolet radiation. Thorium dioxide has since been replaced in this application by rare-earth oxides, such as lanthanum, as they provide similar effects and are not radioactive.

Thorium tetrafluoride is used as an anti-reflection material in multilayered optical coatings. It is transparent to electromagnetic waves having wavelengths in the range of 0.350–12 μm, a range that includes near ultraviolet, visible and mid infrared light. Its radiation is primarily due to alpha particles, which can be easily stopped by a thin cover layer of another material. Replacements for thorium tetrafluoride are being developed as of the 2010s, which include lanthanum trifluoride.

Mag-Thor alloys (also called thoriated magnesium) found use in some aerospace applications, though such uses have been phased out due to concerns over radioactivity.

== Potential use for nuclear energy ==
The main nuclear power source in a reactor is the neutron-induced fission of a nuclide; the synthetic fissile nuclei ^{233}U and ^{239}Pu can be bred from neutron capture by the naturally occurring quantity nuclides ^{232}Th and ^{238}U. ^{235}U occurs naturally in significant amounts and is also fissile. (Note: The thirteen fissile actinide isotopes with half-lives over a year are ^{229}Th, ^{233}U, ^{235}U, ^{236}Np, ^{239}Pu, ^{241}Pu, ^{242m}Am, ^{243}Cm, ^{245}Cm, ^{247}Cm, ^{249}Cf, ^{251}Cf, and ^{252}Es. Of these, only ^{235}U have significant amounts in nature, and only ^{233}U and ^{239}Pu can be bred from naturally occurring nuclei with a single neutron capture.) In the thorium fuel cycle, the fertile isotope ^{232}Th is bombarded by slow neutrons, undergoing neutron capture to become ^{233}Th, which undergoes two consecutive beta decays to become first ^{233}Pa and then the fissile ^{233}U:

$$\ce{{^{232}_{90}Th} ->[\text{(n,}\gamma\text{)}] {^{233}_{90}Th}->[\beta^-][\text{21.8 min}] {^{233}_{91}Pa} ->[\beta^-][\text{27 days}] {^{233}_{92}U} \ (->[\alpha][1.60 \times 10^5\text{years}])}$$

Transmutations in the thorium fuel cycle
														**^{237}Np**
														↑
		^{231}U	←	^{232}U	↔	^{233}U	↔	^{234}U	↔	**^{235}U**	↔	**^{236}U**	→	^{237}U
		↓		↑		↑		↑
		^{231}Pa	→	^{232}Pa	←	^{233}Pa	→	^{234}Pa
		↑				↑
^{230}Th	→	^{231}Th	←	**^{232}Th**	→	^{233}Th
Nuclides with a yellow background in italic have half-lives under 30 days; Nuclides in **bold** have half-lives over 1,000,000 years; Nuclides in red frames are fissile

^{233}U is fissile and can be used as a nuclear fuel in the same way as ^{235}U or ^{239}Pu. When ^{233}U undergoes nuclear fission, the neutrons emitted can strike further ^{232}Th nuclei, continuing the cycle. This parallels the uranium fuel cycle in fast breeder reactors where ^{238}U undergoes neutron capture to become ^{239}U, beta decaying to first ^{239}Np and then fissile ^{239}Pu.

The fission of ^{233}_{92}U produces 2.48 neutrons on average. One neutron is needed to keep the fission reaction going. For a self-contained continuous breeding cycle, one more neutron is needed to breed a new ^{233}_{92}U atom from the fertile ^{232}_{90}Th. This leaves a margin of 0.45 neutrons (or 18% of the neutron flux) for losses.

=== Advantages ===
Thorium is more abundant than uranium, and could satisfy world energy demands for longer. It is particularly suitable for being used as fertile material in molten salt reactors.

^{232}Th absorbs neutrons more readily than ^{238}U, and ^{233}U has a higher probability of fission upon neutron capture (92.0%) than ^{235}U (85.5%) or ^{239}Pu (73.5%). It also releases more neutrons upon fission on average. A single neutron capture by ^{238}U produces transuranic waste along with the fissile ^{239}Pu, but ^{232}Th only produces this waste after five captures, forming ^{237}Np. This number of captures does not happen for 98–99% of the ^{232}Th nuclei because the intermediate products ^{233}U or ^{235}U undergo fission, and fewer long-lived transuranics are produced. Because of this, thorium is a potentially attractive alternative to uranium in mixed oxide fuels to minimise the generation of transuranics and maximise the destruction of plutonium.

Thorium fuels result in a safer and better-performing reactor core because thorium dioxide has a higher melting point, higher thermal conductivity, and a lower coefficient of thermal expansion. It is more stable chemically than the now-common fuel uranium dioxide, because the latter oxidises to triuranium octoxide (U_{3}O_{8}), becoming substantially less dense.

=== Disadvantages ===
The used fuel is difficult and dangerous to reprocess because many of the daughters of ^{232}Th and ^{233}U are strong gamma emitters. All ^{233}U production methods result in impurities of ^{232}U, either from parasitic knock-out (n,2n) reactions on ^{232}Th, ^{233}Pa, or ^{233}U that result in the loss of a neutron, or from double neutron capture of ^{230}Th, an impurity in natural ^{232}Th:

^{230}_{90}Th + n → ^{231}_{90}Th + γ ^{231}_{91}Pa ( ^{227}_{89}Ac )
^{231}_{91}Pa + n → ^{232}_{91}Pa + γ ^{232}_{92}U

^{232}U by itself is not particularly harmful, but quickly decays to produce the strong gamma emitter ^{208}Tl. (^{232}Th follows the same decay chain, but its much longer half-life means that the quantities of ^{208}Tl produced are negligible.) These impurities of ^{232}U make ^{233}U easy to detect and dangerous to work on, and the impracticality of their separation limits the possibilities of nuclear proliferation using ^{233}U as the fissile material. ^{233}Pa has a relatively long half-life of 27 days and a high cross section for neutron capture. Thus it is a neutron poison: instead of rapidly decaying to the useful ^{233}U, a significant amount of ^{233}Pa converts to ^{234}U and consumes neutrons, degrading the reactor efficiency. To avoid this, ^{233}Pa is extracted from the active zone of thorium molten salt reactors during their operation, so that it does not have a chance to capture a neutron and will only decay to ^{233}U.

The irradiation of ^{232}Th with neutrons, followed by its processing, needs to be mastered before these advantages can be realised. Because this requires more advanced technology than the uranium and plutonium fuel cycle, research continues in this area. Others cite the low commercial viability of the thorium fuel cycle: the international Nuclear Energy Agency predicts that the thorium cycle will never be commercially viable while uranium is available in abundance—a situation which may persist "in the coming decades". The isotopes produced in the thorium fuel cycle are mostly not transuranic, but some of them are still very dangerous, such as ^{231}Pa, which has a half-life of 32,760 years and is a major contributor to the long-term radiotoxicity of spent nuclear fuel.

== Hazards and health effects ==
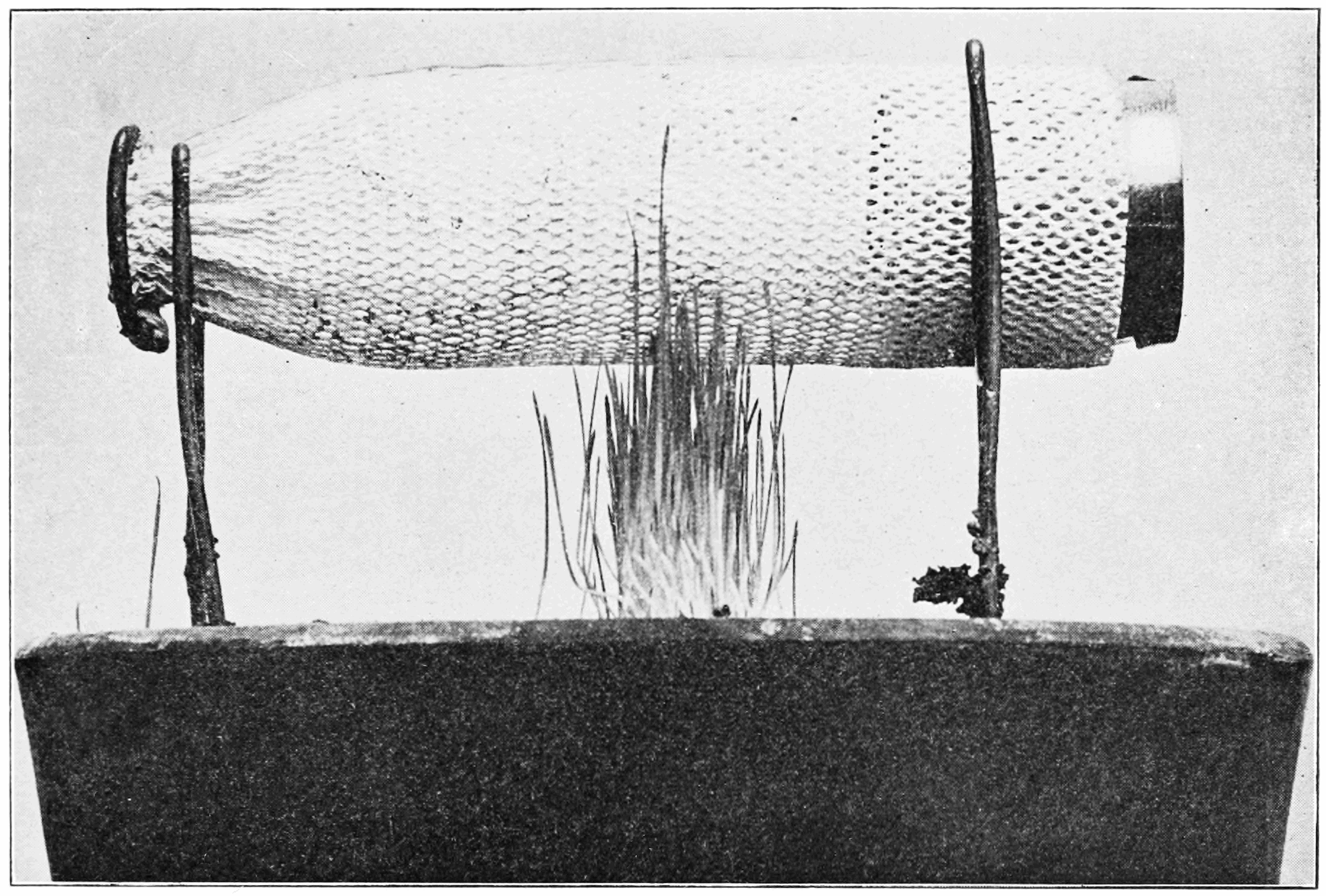
Experiment on the effect of radiation (from an unburned thorium gas mantle) on the germination and growth of timothy-grass seed

=== Radiological ===
Natural thorium decays very slowly compared to many other radioactive materials, and the emitted alpha radiation cannot penetrate human skin. As a result, handling small amounts of thorium, such as those in gas mantles, is considered safe, although the use of such items may pose some risks. Exposure to an aerosol of thorium, such as contaminated dust, can lead to increased risk of cancers of the lung, pancreas, and blood, as lungs and other internal organs can be penetrated by alpha radiation. Internal exposure to thorium leads to increased risk of liver diseases.

The decay products of ^{232}Th include more dangerous radionuclides such as radium and radon. Although relatively little of those products are created as the result of the slow decay of thorium, a proper assessment of the radiological toxicity of ^{232}Th must include the contribution of its daughters, some of which are dangerous gamma emitters, and which are built up quickly following the initial decay of ^{232}Th due to the absence of long-lived nuclides along the decay chain. As the dangerous daughters of thorium have much lower melting points than thorium dioxide, they are volatilised every time the mantle is heated for use. In the first hour of use large fractions of the thorium daughters ^{224}Ra, ^{228}Ra, ^{212}Pb, and ^{212}Bi are released. Most of the radiation dose by a normal user arises from inhaling the radium, resulting in a radiation dose of up to 0.2 millisieverts per use, about a third of the dose sustained during a mammogram.

Some nuclear safety agencies make recommendations about the use of thorium mantles and have raised safety concerns regarding their manufacture and disposal; the radiation dose from one mantle is not a serious problem, but that from many mantles gathered together in factories or landfills is.

=== Biological ===
Thorium is odourless and tasteless. The chemical toxicity of thorium is low because thorium and its most common compounds (mostly the dioxide) are poorly soluble in water, precipitating out before entering the body as the hydroxide. Some thorium compounds are chemically moderately toxic, especially in the presence of strong complex-forming ions such as citrate that carry the thorium into the body in soluble form. If a thorium-containing object has been chewed or sucked, it loses 0.4% of thorium and 90% of its dangerous daughters to the body. Three-quarters of the thorium that has penetrated the body accumulates in the skeleton. Absorption through the skin is possible, but is not a likely means of exposure. Thorium's low solubility in water also means that excretion of thorium by the kidneys and faeces is rather slow.

Tests on the thorium uptake of workers involved in monazite processing showed thorium levels above recommended limits in their bodies, but no adverse effects on health were found at those moderately low concentrations. No chemical toxicity has yet been observed in the tracheobronchial tract and the lungs from exposure to thorium. People who work with thorium compounds are at a risk of dermatitis. It can take as much as thirty years after the ingestion of thorium for symptoms to manifest themselves. Thorium has no known biological role. However, a study by Tonietti et al. showed that some microorganisms can mobilize thorium through bioleaching processes. In particular, Sphingomonas desiccabilis was shown to selectively mobilize thorium from terrestrial and extraterrestrial rock substrates under circumneutral conditions.

=== Chemical ===
Powdered thorium metal is pyrophoric: it ignites spontaneously in air. In 1964, the United States Department of the Interior listed thorium as "severe" on a table entitled "Ignition and explosibility of metal powders". Its ignition temperature was given as 270 °C (518 °F; 543 K) for dust clouds and 280 °C (536 °F; 553 K) for layers. Its minimum explosive concentration was listed as 0.075 oz/cu ft (0.075 kg/m^{3}); the minimum igniting energy for (non-submicron) dust was listed as 5 mJ.

In 1956, the Sylvania Electric Products explosion occurred during reprocessing and burning of thorium sludge in New York City, United States. Nine people were injured; one died of complications caused by third-degree burns.

=== Exposure routes ===
Thorium exists in very small quantities everywhere on Earth although larger amounts exist in certain parts: the average human contains about 40 micrograms of thorium and typically consumes three micrograms per day. Most thorium exposure occurs through dust inhalation; some thorium comes with food and water, but because of its low solubility, this exposure is negligible.

Exposure is raised for people who live near thorium deposits or radioactive waste disposal sites, those who live near or work in uranium, phosphate, or tin processing factories, and for those who work in gas mantle production. Thorium is especially common in the Tamil Nadu coastal areas of India, where residents may be exposed to a naturally occurring radiation dose ten times higher than the worldwide average. It is also common in northern Brazilian coastal areas, from south Bahia to Guarapari, a city with radioactive monazite sand beaches, with radiation levels up to 50 times higher than world average background radiation.

Another possible source of exposure is thorium dust produced at weapons testing ranges, as thorium is used in the guidance systems of some missiles. This has been blamed for a high incidence of birth defects and cancer at Salto di Quirra on the Italian island of Sardinia.

== See also ==
- Thorium Energy Alliance

== General and cited references ==
- Greenwood, N. N.; Earnshaw, A. (1997). Chemistry of the Elements (2nd ed.). Butterworth-Heinemann. ISBN 978-0-08-037941-8.
- Stoll, W. (2005). "Thorium and Thorium Compounds". Ullmann's Encyclopedia of Industrial Chemistry. Wiley-VCH. doi:10.1002/14356007.a27_001. ISBN 978-3-527-31097-5.
- Wickleder, Mathias S.; Fourest, Blandine; Dorhout, Peter K. (2006). "Thorium". The Chemistry of the Actinide and Transactinide Elements. pp. 52–160. doi:10.1007/1-4020-3598-5_3. ISBN 978-1-4020-3555-5.
