= Thor's Fight with the Giants =

1872 painting by Mårten Eskil Winge

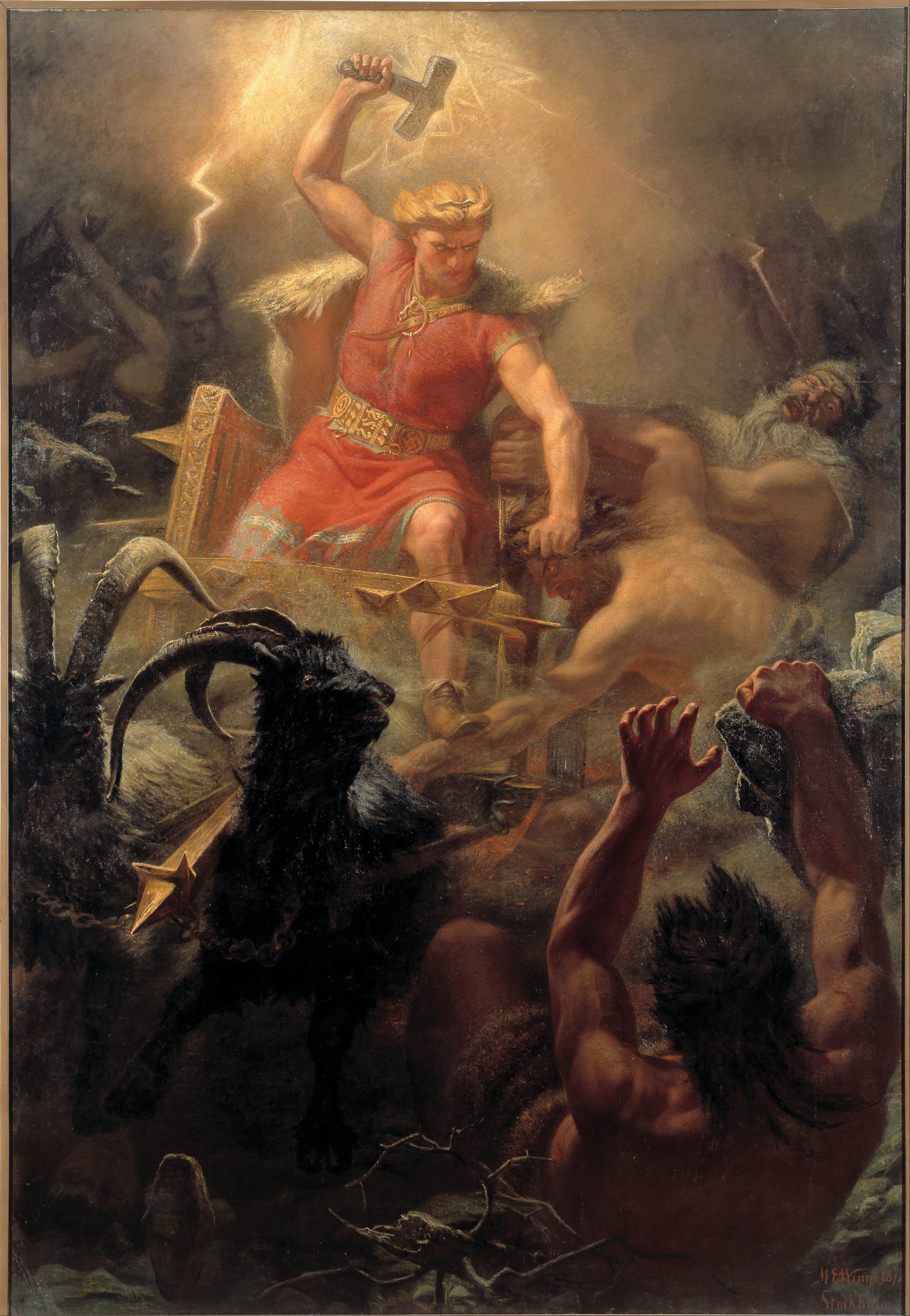
Thor's Fight with the Giants

Thor's Fight with the Giants (Swedish: Tors strid med jättarna) is an 1872 painting by the Swedish artist Mårten Eskil Winge. It depicts the Norse god Thor in a battle against the jötnar. The thunder god rides his chariot pulled by the goats Tanngrisnir and Tanngnjóstr, wears his belt Megingjörð, and swings his hammer Mjölnir, which is wreathed in lightning. The painting was made using oil on canvas, has the dimensions 484 x 333 centimeters, and belongs to Nationalmuseum in Stockholm.

== History ==
Winge was a professor at the Royal Swedish Academy of Arts, where history painting was regarded as the most important genre of art. He also belonged to the Swedish national liberal movement, in which Norse myths and legends were frequently used as motifs. The painting was finished in 1872 and bought by King Charles XV, who died the same year and bequeathed it to Nationalmuseum.

== Reception ==
The painting was exhibited publicly at Nationalmuseum in 1872. It was received positively in the press and immediately drew large crowds; some people stood in line for hours to see it. The young August Strindberg wrote a positive review in which he interpreted the subject matter as a depiction of truth's struggle against falsehood. The art historian Bo Grandien characterized the painting in 1987 as an example of the national liberal movement using Norse motifs to extol democracy and the fight against ignorance.

== See also ==
- Swastika (Germanic Iron Age): the symbol appears throughout the archaeological record of the ancient Germanic peoples.
