= Mårten Eskil Winge =

Swedish artist (1825–1896)

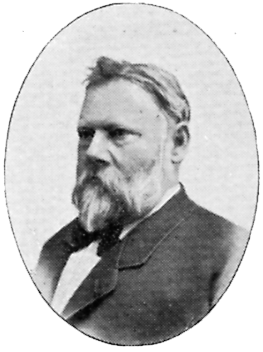
Winge, pictured in the Svenskt porträttgalleri

Mårten Eskil Winge (21 September 1825 – 22 April 1896) was a Swedish artist. He was a professor at the Royal Swedish Academy of Arts. He was associated with the Düsseldorf school of painting. His art was influenced by the Norse mythology themes also found in works by Nils Blommér (1816–1853) and Carl Wahlbom (1810-1858).

== Biography ==
Born in Stockholm, Mårten Eskil Winge was the son of the rector and vicar Isaac Martin Winge and Andrietta Sophia Rothman. Winge was educated at the Uppsala Cathedral School, passing his studentexamen in 1846, after which he became an apprentice in painting with P. E. Wallander in Stockholm. The following year, he enrolled in the Royal Swedish Academy of Fine Arts. While studying there, he worked at the post office and painted portraits for additional income. He had become interested in the Old Norse sagas while growing up, and during his studies his elaborate drawings on Norse topics attracted attention. Among other things, he illustrated Nordens Guder by Danish poet and playwright Adam Oehlenschläger (1779–1850) and Crown Prince Charles's poems Fosterbröderna (1848) Heidi, Gylfes dotter (1852) and En vikingasaga (1855). He was also attracted to Gothicismus, the movement in Sweden under the influence of national romanticism to reclaim the Norsemen as heroic ancestors; together with his fellow student and friend, August Malmström (1829–1901), he revived motifs from Norse history and legends.

In 1856 Winge became a student of Johan Christoffer Boklund (1817–1880) in the newly established school of painting at the Royal Swedish Academy. The following year he received a Royal Medal for his painting of King Charles X at the death bed of Axel Oxenstierna (1583–1654), and received a three-year stipend that enabled him to take a field trip by way of Düsseldorf to Paris, where he studied with Thomas Couture (1815–1879) and where he visited the Louvre to copy Peter Paul Rubens' The Wise Men in Bethlehem. The stipend was extended for a further three years, and in 1859 he made a trip to Rome before returning to Sweden in 1863.

In 1864 Winge became a member of the Academy of Arts and eventually, after various jobs as a drawing teacher, a professor. In 1865 he opened a school of painting in his studio and in 1877 he returned to Italy. Rome gave him great artistic experiences and inspiration.

Winge created several paintings on Norse legendary and mythological topics in the 1860s, which attracted much interest and approval. For the first after his return to Sweden, Hjalmar's farewell to Örvar-Oddr after the Battle of Samsø, Charles XV, now king, assisted with the landscape. His Thor's Fight with the Giants (1872), deemed a "typical 19th-century image of the Thunder God", was commissioned and bought by Charles XV, who also bought Kraka (1862). It is in the collection of the Nationalmuseum in Stockholm, where Winge painted eight of the portraits of artists for the ceiling.

Beginning in the 1870s, he was commissioned to produce altarpieces for several churches. He also painted decorations for the Bolinderska palace (today part of the Grand Hôtel in Stockholm) and for Kulla Gunnarstorp Castle in Scania. In his last years he made several paintings of waves breaking on the sea shore.

== Personal life ==
In 1867, he married textile artist Hanna Winge, née Tengelin (1838–1896). She was a genre painter and co-founder of a craftsmen's association, Friends of Handicraft. He died during 1896 in Enköping.

== Gallery ==
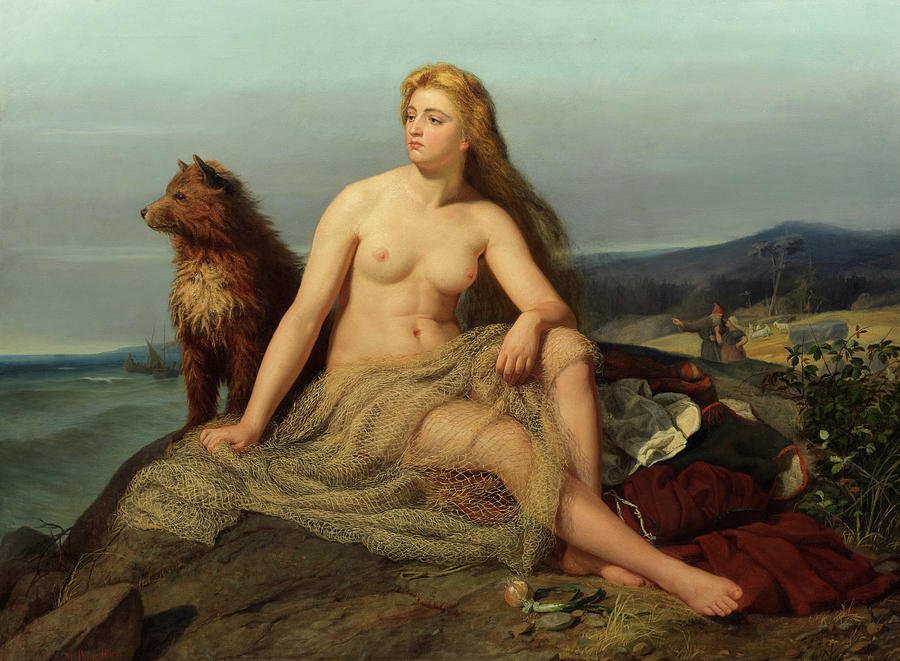
Kraka (1862)

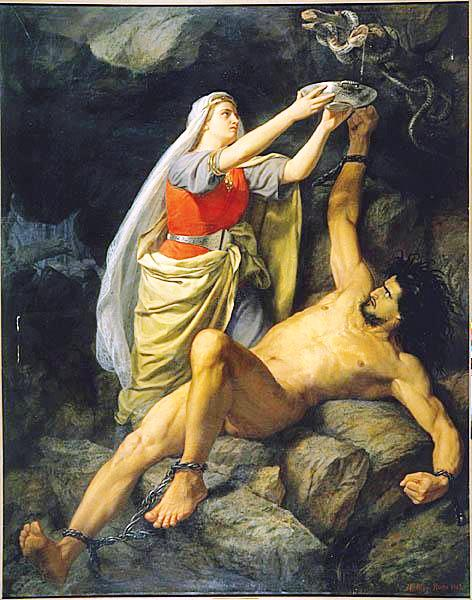
Loki and Sigyn (1863)

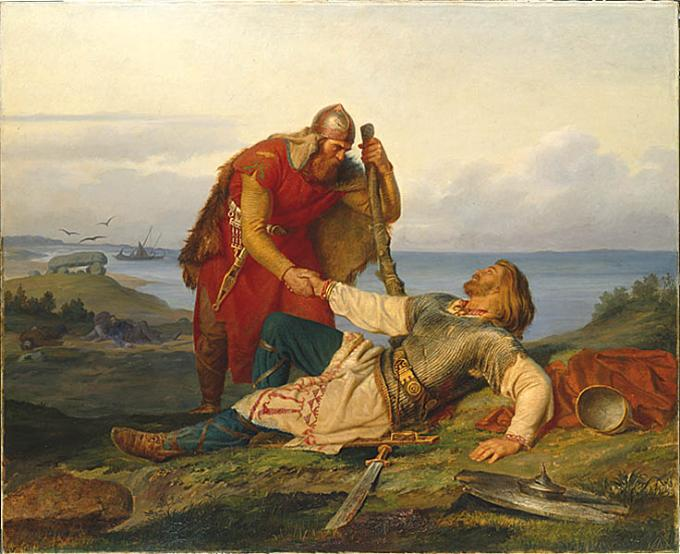
Hjalmar's farewell to Örvar-Oddr after the Battle of Samsø (1866)

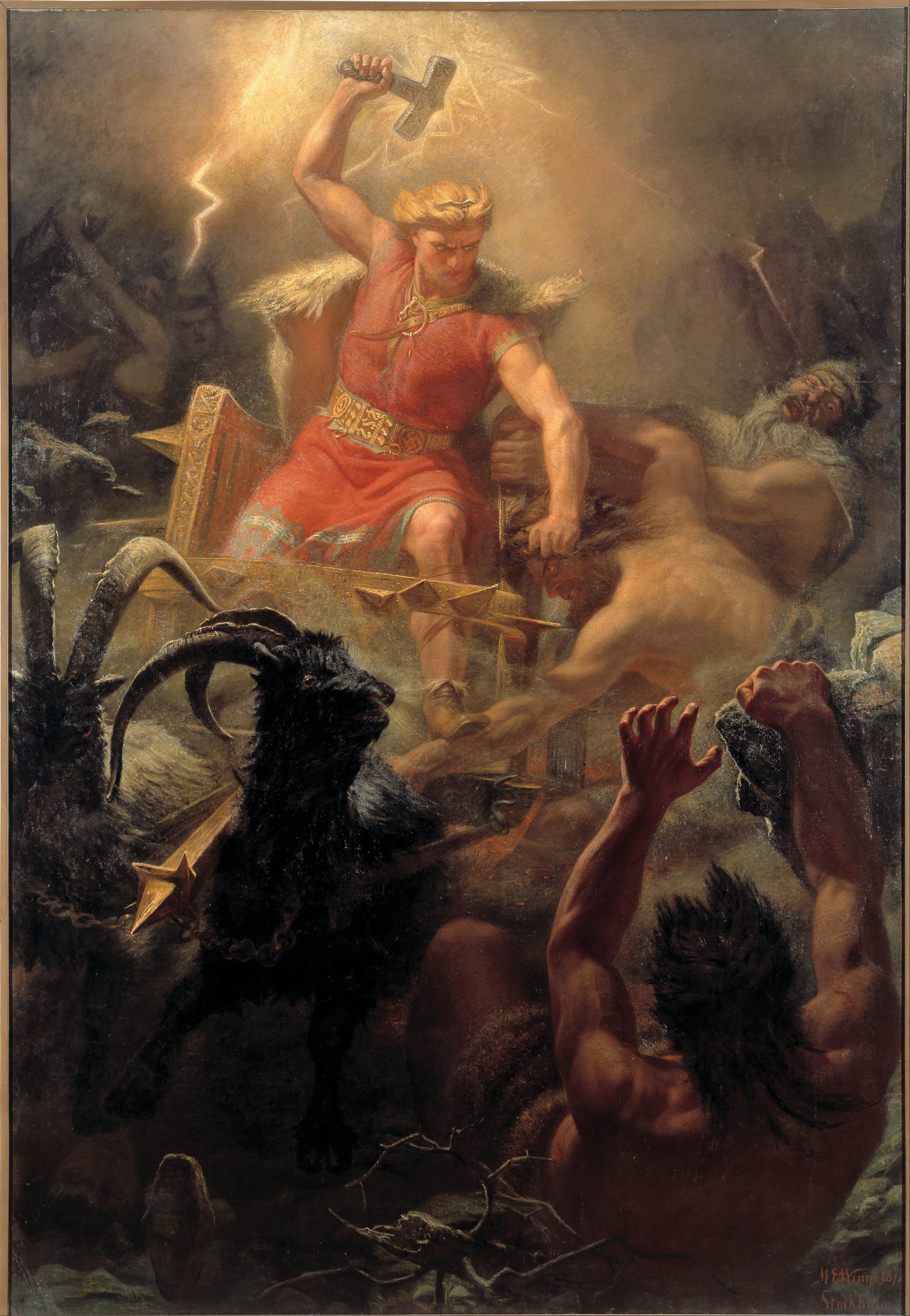
Thor's Fight with the Giants (1872)

== Other sources ==
- Från vår konstverld Public domain text in Swedish
