= Eidanger (disambiguation) =

Eidanger may refer to:

== Places ==
- Eidanger, a village in Porsgrunn Municipality in Telemark county, Norway
- Eidanger Municipality, a former municipality in Telemark county, Norway
- Eidanger prestegjeld, a former geographic subdivision of the Church of Norway in Telemark county, Norway
- Eidanger Church, a church in Porsgrunn Municipality in Telemark county, Norway
- Eidanger Station, a railway station in Porsgrunn Municipality in Telemark county, Norway

== Other ==
- Eidanger IL, a sports club based in Porsgrunn Municipality in Telemark county, Norway
