= Olaf Aarvold =

Norwegian priest and politician

Deputy representative for the Parliament of Norway
- In office 1950–1953, 1954–1957, and 1958–1961

Member of the Municipal Council of Eidanger Municipality
- In office 1960–1963

Personal details
- Born: 3 February 1899
- Died: 3 August 1991 (aged 92)
- Party: Liberal Party
- Occupation: priest

Olaf Aarvold (3 February 1899, Gjerpen Municipality - 3 August 1991) was a Norwegian priest and politician for the Liberal Party.

He graduated from upper secondary school in 1922, and worked as a teacher in Larvik from 1923 to 1925. In 1929 he graduated with the cand.theol. degree from the MF Norwegian School of Theology. He worked as a priest in Durban 1930, Rouen 1935 and Antwerp 1936. In 1940 he returned to Norway as vicar at Tysnes Church. Having been imprisoned by the German occupants from 1943 to 1945, first in Espeland concentration camp from September 1943 to January 1944 and then Grini concentration camp until the war's end, he moved on to become chaplain in Bergen in 1946. He was appointed vicar in Eidanger Church in 1957.

He served as a deputy representative to the Parliament of Norway from Bergen during the terms 1950–1953, 1954–1957, and 1958–1961. He met during 35 days of parliamentary session. On the local level he was a member of the executive committee of the municipal council of Eidanger Municipality from 1960 to 1963.

In 1930 he married Gudrun Johansen; the couple had three children.
