= Aarvold =

Aarvold is a surname. Notable people with the surname include:

- Sir Carl Aarvold (1907–1991), British rugby player, barrister, and Recorder of London
- Kari Aarvold Glaser (1901–1972), Norwegian classical pianist and music teacher
- Olaf Aarvold (1899–1991), Norwegian Lutheran priest and politician
