= Thorite =

Nesosilicate mineral

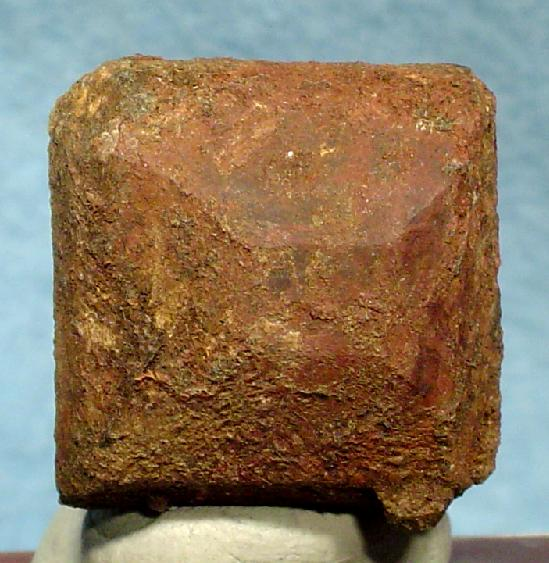
- Thorite crystal from the Kemp uranium mine in Ontario (size: 2.2 × 2.2 × 1.6 cm)

General
- Category: Silicate mineral
- Formula: (Th,U)SiO_{4}
- IMA symbol: Thr
- Strunz classification: 9.AD.30
- Crystal system: Tetragonal
- Crystal class: Ditetragonal dipyramidal (4/mmm); H-M symbol: (4/m 2/m 2/m)
- Space group: I4_{1}/amd
- Unit cell: a = 7.13, c = 6.32 [Å]; Z = 4

Identification
- Color: Yellow-orange, brownish yellow, brownish black, black, green
- Crystal habit: In square prisms, or pseudo-octahedral crystals; also massive
- Cleavage: Distinct on {110}
- Fracture: Conchoidal
- Tenacity: Brittle
- Mohs scale hardness: 4.5 – 5
- Luster: Vitreous to resinous
- Streak: Light orange to light brown sometimes even an alien magenta
- Diaphaneity: Nearly opaque, transparent in thin fragments
- Specific gravity: 6.63 – 7.20
- Optical properties: Uniaxial (−)
- Refractive index: n_{ω} = 1.790 – 1.840 n_{ε} = 1.780 – 1.820
- Birefringence: δ = 0.010 – 0.020
- Alters to: Commonly metamict
- Other characteristics: Radioactive

Thorite, (Th,U)SiO_{4}, is a rare nesosilicate of thorium that crystallizes in the tetragonal system and is isomorphous with zircon and hafnon. It is the most common mineral of thorium and is nearly always strongly radioactive. Thorite was discovered in 1828 on the island of Løvøya, Norway, by the vicar and mineralogist, Hans Morten Thrane Esmark. First specimens of thorite were sent to his father, Jens Esmark, who was a professor of mineralogy and geology. It was named in 1829 to reflect its thorium content.

== Occurrence ==
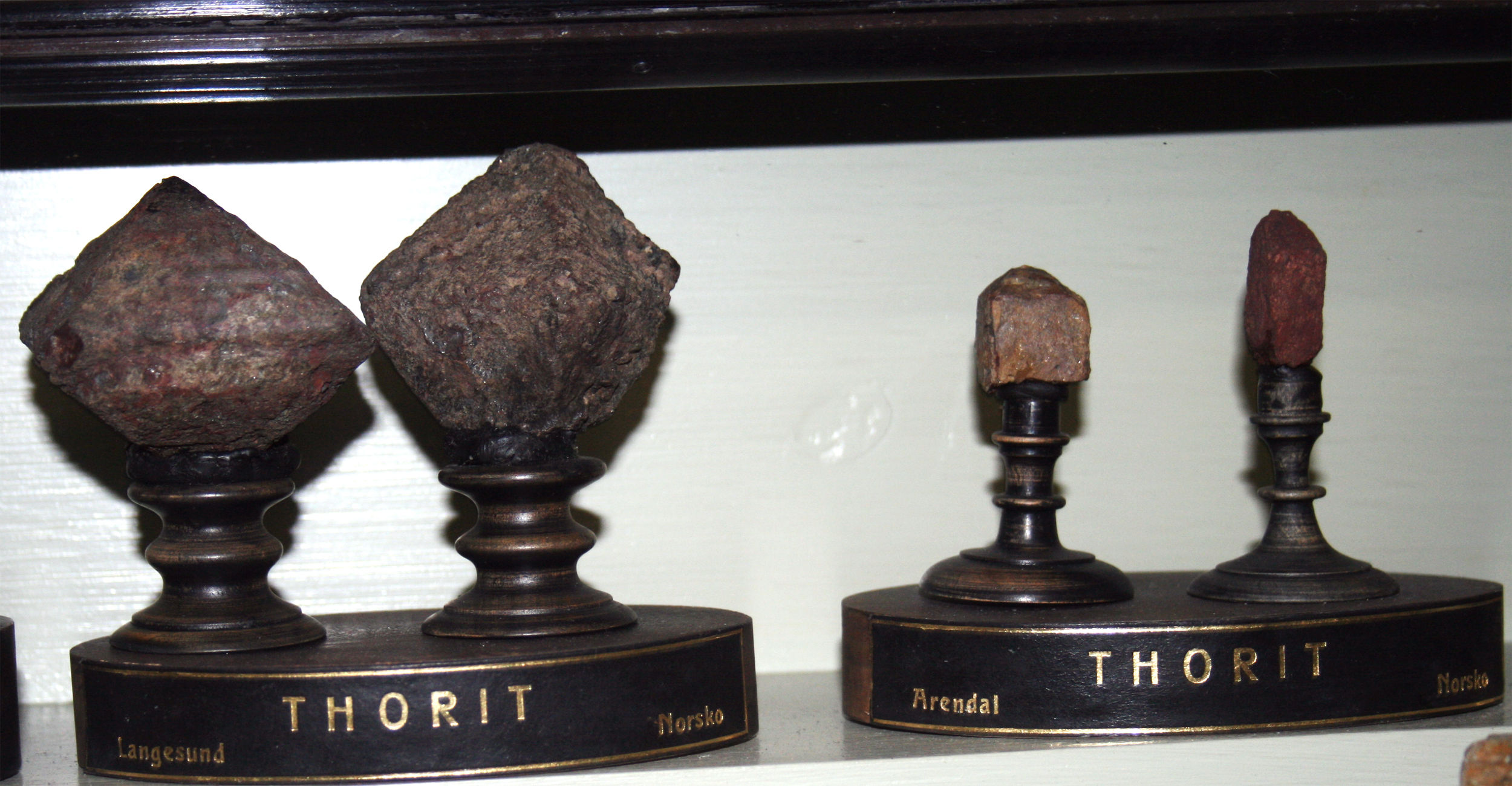
Thorite in Prague national museum

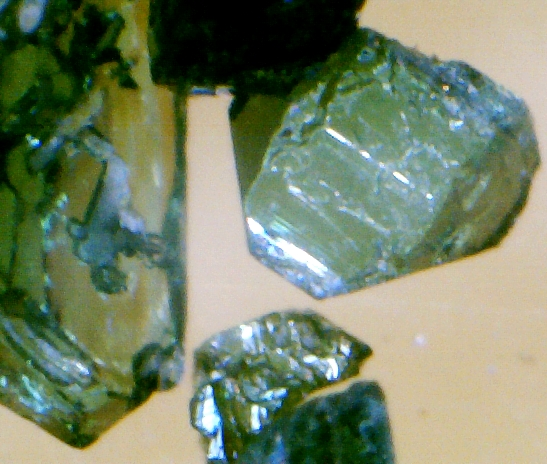
Small crystals of green thorite under magnification

Specimens of thorite generally come from igneous pegmatites and volcanic extrusive rocks, hydrothermal veins and contact metamorphic rocks. It is also known to occur as small grains in detrital sands. Crystals are rare, but when found can produce nicely shaped short prismatic crystals with pyramidal terminations. It is commonly associated with zircon, monazite, gadolinite, fergusonite, uraninite, yttrialite and pyrochlore.

Thorite is currently an important ore of uranium. A variety of thorite, often called "uranothorite", is particularly rich in uranium and has been a viable uranium ore at Bancroft in Ontario, Canada. Other varieties of thorite include "orangite", an orange variety, and "calciothorite", an impure variety with trace amounts of calcium.

== Properties ==
Due to the radioactive elements contained, thorite is commonly metamict. With the destructive effects of radioactivity on the crystal lattice, hydrated specimens are often amorphous and optically isotropic. Owing to differences in composition, the specific gravity varies from 4.4 to 6.6 g/cm^{3}. Hardness is 4.5 and the luster is vitreous or resinous. The color is normally black, but can range from brownish black to orange, yellowish-orange and dark green.
