= Erik Hesselberg =

Norwegian sculptor

- Born: 4 June 1914; Brevik, Norway
- Died: 15 September 1972 (aged 58); Larvik, Norway
- Occupations: Painter sculptor
- Known for: Crew member on the Kon-Tiki
- Children: 1 son and 2 daughters

Erik Bryn Hesselberg (4 June 1914 – 15 September 1972) was a Norwegian sailor, author, photographer, painter and sculptor. He is most known as a crewmember of the Kon-Tiki raft expedition from South America to French Polynesia in 1947.

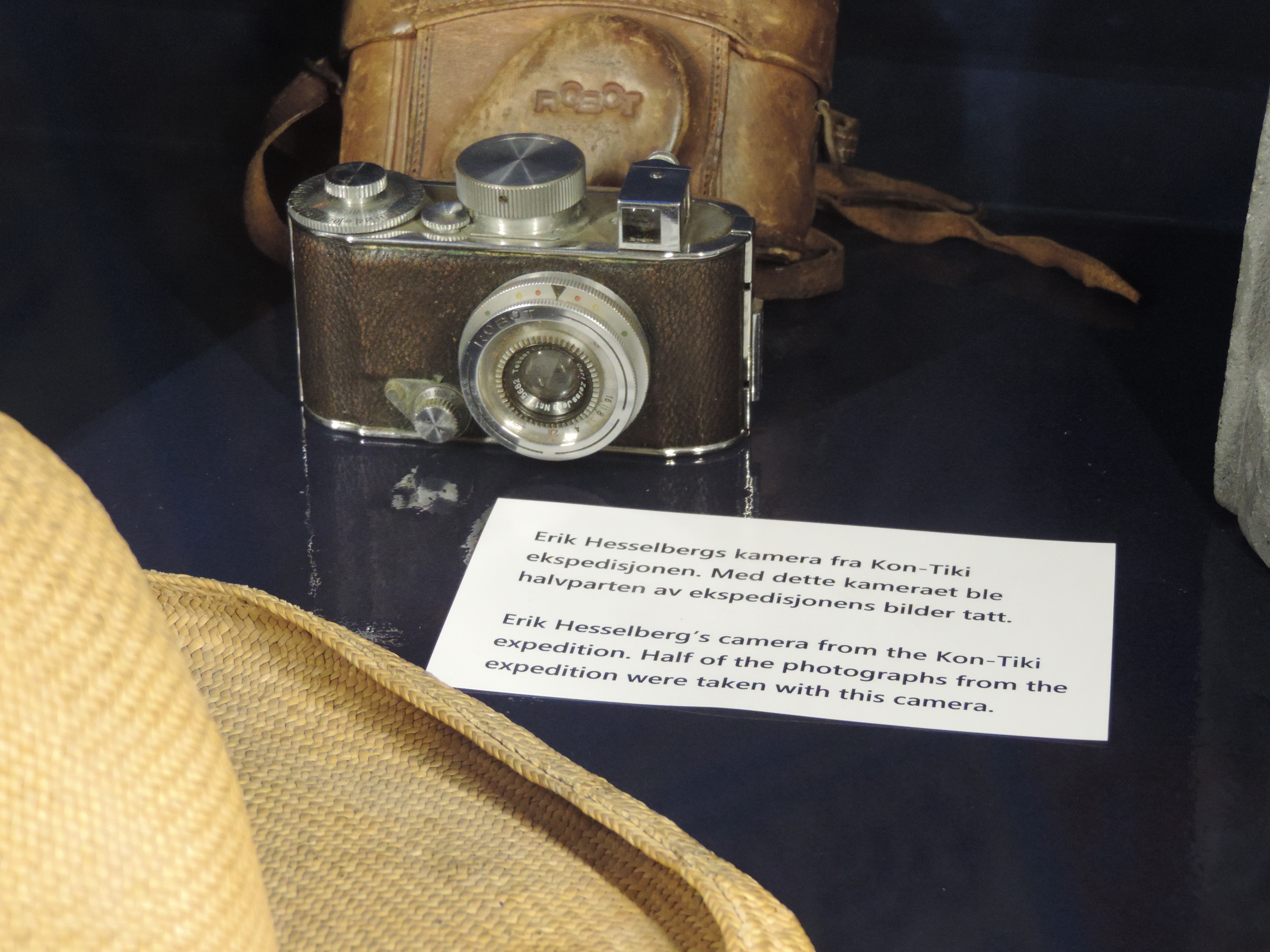
Erik Hasselberg's camera from the Kon-Tiki expedition

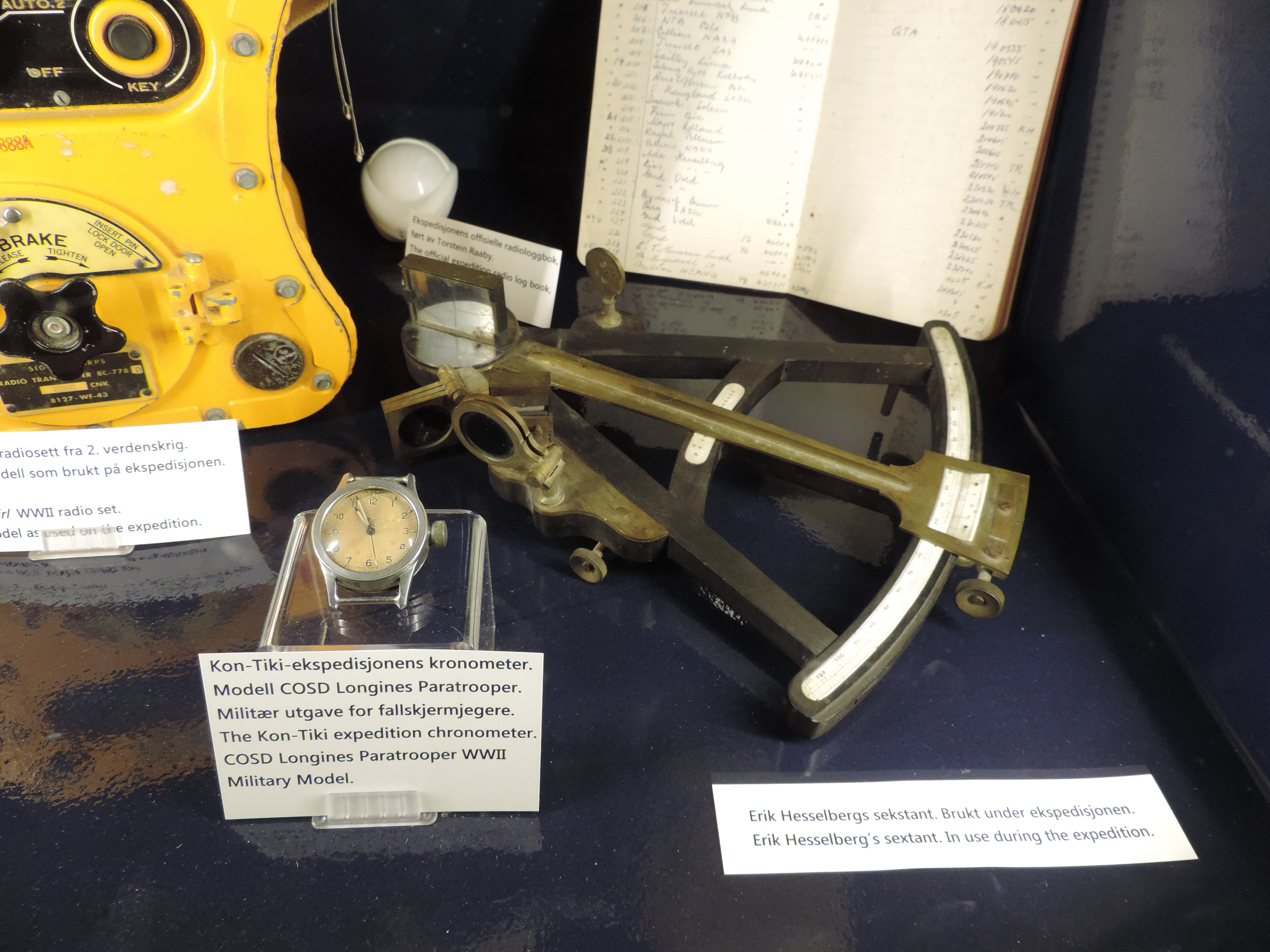
Erik Hesseberg's sextant from the Kon-Tiki expedition

== Biography ==
Erik Hesselberg was born at Brevik in Telemark, Norway. He grew up at Larvik in Vestfold. He knew Thor Heyerdahl from his childhood years. Having graduated from his secondary school, Erik Hesselberg went on to a sailors' school and later worked as a professional sailor for five years, making several trips around the world. Later Hesselberg studied art in Hamburg, Germany.

He stayed in Germany when World War II began, so he could not return to Norway and started working as a decorator in Braunschweig. In 1945, he and his German-born wife, Liselotte (Liss) Güldner, relocated to Lillehammer, Norway.

== Kon-Tiki expedition ==
In 1947, Hesselberg lived in the village of Borre and worked as a painter. Thor Heyerdahl approached him and invited to become a navigator on the Kon-Tiki expedition. During the trip, he worked as an astronavigator and cartographer as he was the only professional sailor. He painted the large Kon-Tiki figure on the raft's main sail. Also, he drew sketches, took photographs, carved wooden statuettes, and played guitar.

== Later years ==
After the expedition, Hesselberg wrote and illustrated his only book Kon-Tiki og Jeg (Dreyers Vorlag. 1949) The book has since been translated into a number of languages including English.

Later he built and lived on his own ship sailing for 11 years to in such places as Côte d'Azur, Corsica and Italy, while working as a sculptor and painter. Among his friends were Pablo Picasso, Georges Simenon, Jean Cocteau, and Carl Nesjar. Subsequently, he sold his ship and lived in the United States, Germany, and Sweden, until his final return in 1969–1970 to Larvik.

He was married several times and had three children: daughter Anne Karin Hesselberg (b. 1946), son Caelou Hesselberg (b. 1958), and daughter Susanna Hesselberg (b. 1967). Hesselberg died in Larvik at age 58 of a heart condition and was buried there. He left many photographic pictures, graphic works, sculptures, and more than 200 songs for guitar.

== Book ==
- Hesselberg, Erik (1949). Kon-Tiki och Jeg. Dreyers Forlag, Oslo.
- Hesselberg, Erik (1950). Kon-Tiki and I. Allen & Unwin, London.
