= Jens Esmark =

Danish-Norwegian professor of mineralogy (1763–1839)

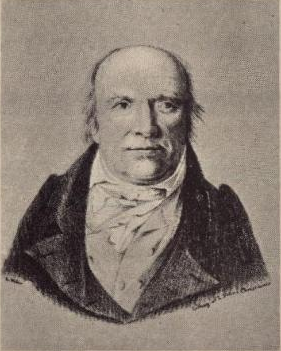
Jens Esmark

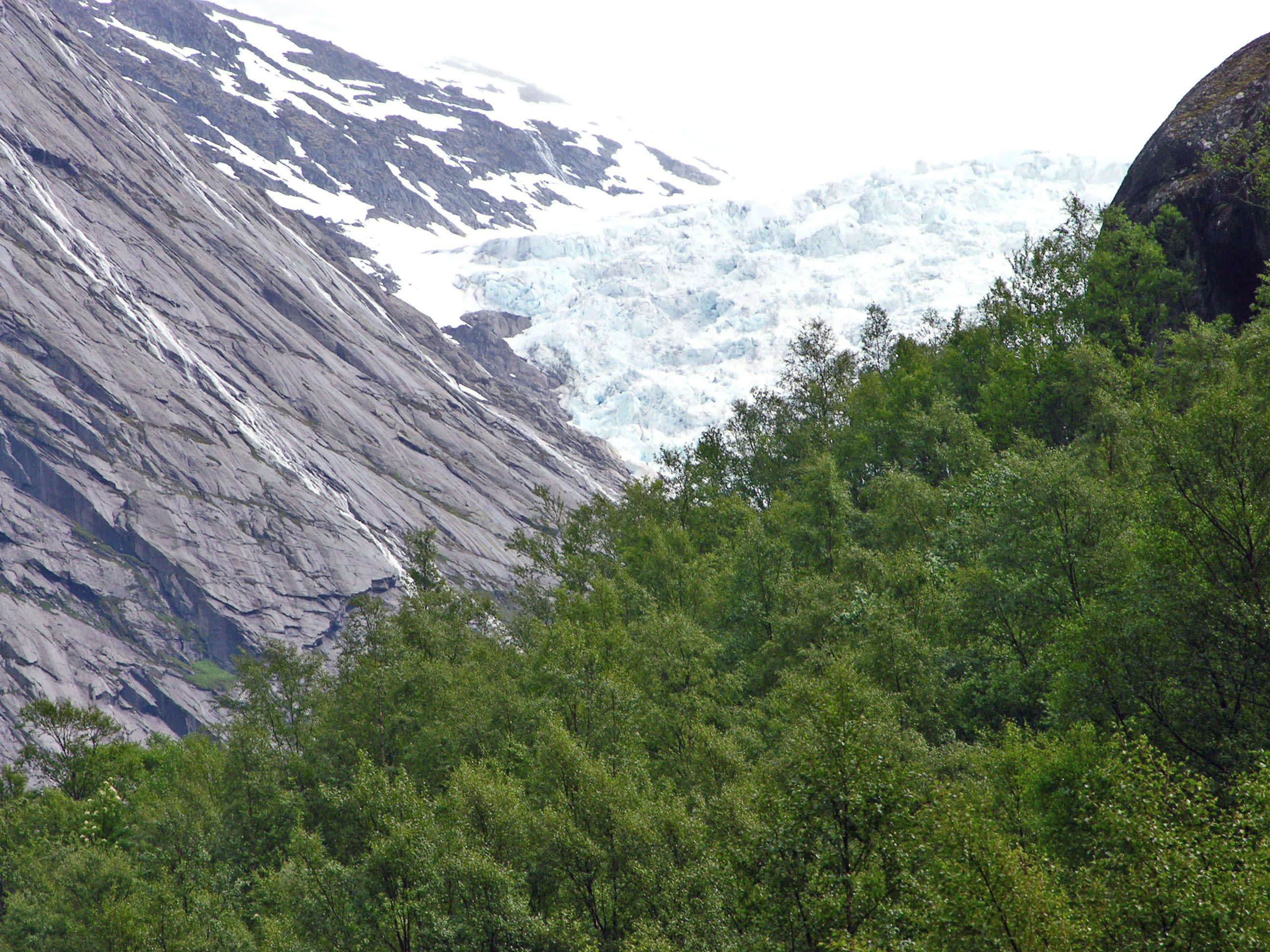
Glacier, Briksdalsbreen, Norway

Jens Esmark (31 January 1763 – 26 January 1839) was a Danish-Norwegian professor of mineralogy who contributed to many of the initial discoveries and conceptual analyses of glaciers, specifically the concept that glaciers had covered larger areas in the past.

== Biography ==
Jens Esmark was born in Houlbjerg in Århus, Denmark. Esmark moved to Norway to the silver mining community of Kongsberg. He studied at the local mining academy. He completed his subsequent studies in Copenhagen and was accepted as a surveyor. Starting in 1797, Esmark was employed as a lecturer in mineralogy at the Kongsberg Mining Academy. In 1814, Esmark became Norway's first professor of geology as a professor of geology at the University of Oslo, and was described as "a pioneer in glacial geology", by professor of Quaternary geology and Glaciology Bjørn G. Andersen.

In 1798, Esmark was the first person to ascend Snøhetta, highest in the mountain range Dovrefjell in southern Norway. The same year he led the first expedition to Bitihorn, a small mountain in the southernmost outskirts of Jotunheimen, Norway. In 1810 he was the first person to ascend the mountain Gaustatoppen in Telemark, Norway.

Professor Esmark theorized in 1824 that glaciers had once been larger and thicker and had covered much of Norway and the adjacent sea floor. He also attributed erratic boulders and moraines to glacial transportation and deposition. He first recognized glaciers as a powerful agent of erosion that had carved the Norwegian fjords.

Professor Esmark was also an important figure in the history and cultural heritage of mineralogy. He introduced norite the name for which was derived from the Norwegian name for Norway, Norge.

On the island of Løvøya, Norway, his son, Hans Morten Thrane Esmark, found the first specimens of a black mineral, thorite, from which the element thorium is derived. His son also provided him with a new mineral which he found in Arendal, Norway. In 1806 he named datolite, from the Greek word meaning "to divide". This was a reference to the granular structure of the first specimens studied.

In 1825, Professor Esmark was elected a member of the Royal Swedish Academy of Sciences. In 1832, he was Knighted in the Swedish Order of Vasa.

== Selected works ==
- Kurze Beschreibung einer mineralogischen Reise durch Ungarn, Siebenbürgen und das Bannat ( Freyberg, 1798)
- Reise fra Christiania til Trondhjem (1829)
