= Eidanger Municipality =

Former municipality in Norway

Eidanger Municipality Eidanger herred
- Former municipality
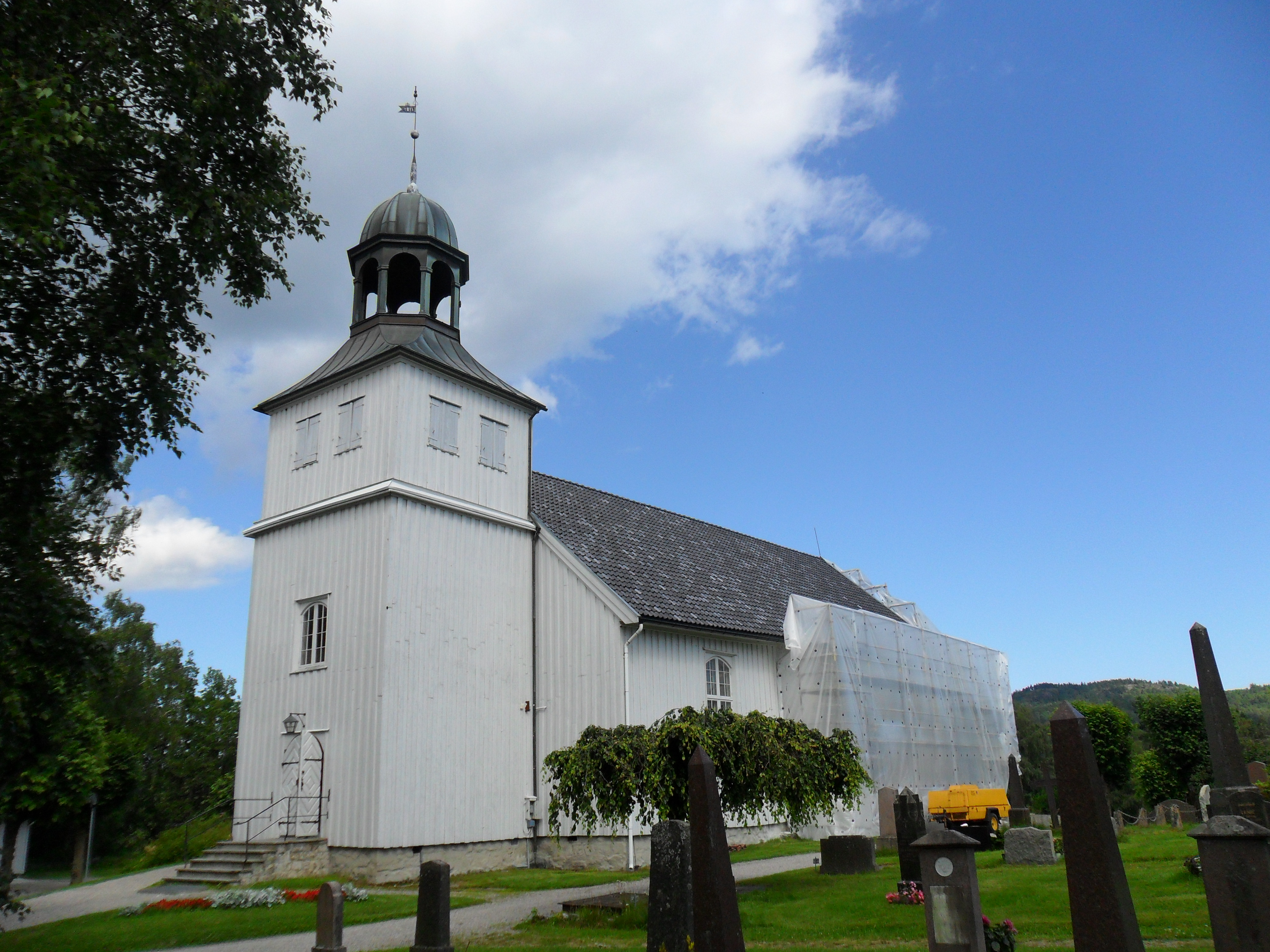
- View of the Eidanger Church

- Telemark within Norway

- Eidanger within Telemark
- Coordinates: 59°07′07″N 9°41′53″E
- Country: Norway
- County: Telemark
- District: Grenland
- Established: 1 Jan 1838
  - Created as: Formannskapsdistrikt
- Disestablished: 1 Jan 1964
  - Succeeded by: Porsgrunn Municipality
- Administrative centre: Eidanger

Area (upon dissolution)
  - Total: 135.9 km^{2} (52.5 sq mi)
  - Rank: #454 in Norway
- Highest elevation (Fjerdingen): 359.94 m (1,180.9 ft)

Population (1963)
  - Total: 12,716
  - Rank: #43 in Norway
  - Density: 93.6/km^{2} (242/sq mi)
  - Change (10 years): ▲ +40.8%
- Demonym: Dangling

Official language
  - Norwegian form: Bokmål
- Time zone: UTC+01:00 (CET)
  - Summer (DST): UTC+02:00 (CEST)
- ISO 3166 code: NO-0813

Eidanger (Norwegian pronunciation: [ˈæi̯dɑŋər]) is a former municipality in Telemark county, Norway. The 135.9-square-kilometre (52.5 sq mi) municipality existed from 1838 until its dissolution in 1964. The area is now part of Porsgrunn Municipality. The administrative centre was the village of Eidanger where Eidanger Church is located.

Prior to its dissolution in 1964, the 135.9-square-kilometre (52.5 sq mi) municipality was the 454th largest by area out of the 689 municipalities in Norway. Eidanger Municipality was the 43rd most populous municipality in Norway with a population of about 12,716. The municipality's population density was 93.6 inhabitants per square kilometre (242/sq mi) and its population had increased by % over the previous 10-year period.

The municipality had excellent natural conditions for building harbours, it became the site of Norsk Hydro's plant at Herøya and the Dalen Portland (now part of the Norcem corporation) concrete factory just outside Brevik. More recently, a major industry in the area is Heistad Fabrikker, which makes products for diabetics. Isola maintains its head office and administration office in Eidanger. Isola has two factories in this area where bitumen-based products and steel roofing tiles are manufactured.

== General information ==
=== Administrative history ===
The formannskapsdistrikt law of 1837 created a system of local government in Norway by establishing each town (ladested or kjøpstad) and each Church of Norway prestegjeld as a civil municipality. On 1 January 1838, Eidanger prestegjeld was established as Eidanger Municipality. On 1 July 1920, an area in the northern part of Eidanger Municipality (population: 550) was transferred to the neighboring Porsgrunn Municipality.

During the 1960s, there were many municipal mergers across Norway due to the work of the Schei Committee. On 1 January 1964, Eidanger Municipality was dissolved and the following areas were merged to form an enlarged Porsgrunn Municipality:

- all of Eidanger Municipality (population: 13,018)
- all of Brevik Municipality (population: 2,498)
- all of Porsgrunn Municipality (population: 10,863)
- the Bakke area (population: 75) of Hedrum Municipality in Vestfold county
- the Enigheten, Høyberg, and Skavåsen areas (population: 12) of Brunlanes Municipality in Vestfold county

=== Name ===
The municipality is named after the old Eidanger prestegjeld. The prestegjeld was named after the Eidangerfjorden (Old Norse: Eiðangr) since the historic Eidanger Church was built at the head of the fjord. The first element is eið which means "isthmus" or "neck of land". The last element is angr which means "fjord" or "bay".

=== Churches ===
The Church of Norway had one parish (sokn) within Eidanger Municipality. At the time of the municipal dissolution, it was part of the Eidanger prestegjeld and the Skien prosti (deanery) in the Diocese of Agder.

Churches in Eidanger Municipality
Parish (sokn)	Church name	Location of the church	Year built
Eidanger	Eidanger Church	Eidanger	c. 1150
Eidanger	Langangen Chapel	Langangen	1891

Eidanger Church (Eidanger kirke) is located in the village of Eidanger and was the main church for the municipality. The church was originally a relatively simple stone church in the Romanesque style, probably built around the year 1150. The church was extended in 1787 and received a new sacristy in 1981. The altarpiece, stained glass and the pulpit is from 1991 and made by Terje Grøstad. The baptismal font is of stone and is from the 1890s. The church has two bells, one from 1720 and one from 1940.

== Geography ==
Eidanger Municipality included a peninsula between the Eidangerfjorden and the Frierfjorden. Situated between the urban municipalities (towns) of Brevik and Porsgrunn. It also included the more rural areas to the north and east of the Eidangerfjorden. The highest point in the municipality was the 359.94-metre (1,180.9 ft) tall mountain Fjerdingen.

Siljan Municipality was located to the north, Hedrum Municipality (in Vestfold county) was located to the northeast, Brunlanes Municipality (in Vestfold county) was located to the east and southeast, Langesund Municipality was located to the south, Brevik Municipality and Stathelle Municipality were located to the southeast, Bamble Municipality was located to the west, and Porsgrunn Municipality and Gjerpen Municipality were located to the northwest.

== Government ==
While it existed, Eidanger Municipality was responsible for primary education (through 10th grade), outpatient health services, senior citizen services, welfare and other social services, zoning, economic development, and municipal roads and utilities. The municipality was governed by a municipal council of directly elected representatives. The mayor was indirectly elected by a vote of the municipal council. The municipality was under the jurisdiction of the Bamble District Court and the Agder Court of Appeal.

=== Municipal council ===
The municipal council (Herredsstyre) of Eidanger Municipality was made up of representatives that were elected to four year terms. The tables below show the historical composition of the council by political party.

Eidanger herredsstyre 1959–1963
Party name (in Norwegian)	Number of representatives
Labour Party (Arbeiderpartiet)	23
Conservative Party (Høyre)	4
Communist Party (Kommunistiske Parti)	4
Christian Democratic Party (Kristelig Folkeparti)	4
Centre Party (Senterpartiet)	2
Liberal Party (Venstre)	8
Total number of members:	45
Note: On 1 January 1964, Eidanger Municipality became part of Porsgrunn Municipality.

Eidanger herredsstyre 1955–1959
Party name (in Norwegian)	Number of representatives
Labour Party (Arbeiderpartiet)	23
Conservative Party (Høyre)	4
Communist Party (Kommunistiske Parti)	5
Christian Democratic Party (Kristelig Folkeparti)	4
Farmers' Party (Bondepartiet)	1
Liberal Party (Venstre)	8
Total number of members:	45

Eidanger herredsstyre 1951–1955
Party name (in Norwegian)	Number of representatives
Labour Party (Arbeiderpartiet)	15
Communist Party (Kommunistiske Parti)	4
Christian Democratic Party (Kristelig Folkeparti)	3
Liberal Party (Venstre)	6
Joint List(s) of Non-Socialist Parties (Borgerlige Felleslister)	4
Total number of members:	32

Eidanger herredsstyre 1947–1951
Party name (in Norwegian)	Number of representatives
Labour Party (Arbeiderpartiet)	12
Communist Party (Kommunistiske Parti)	7
Christian Democratic Party (Kristelig Folkeparti)	3
Joint list of the Liberal Party (Venstre) and the Radical People's Party (Radikale Folkepartiet)	6
Joint List(s) of Non-Socialist Parties (Borgerlige Felleslister)	4
Total number of members:	32

Eidanger herredsstyre 1945–1947
Party name (in Norwegian)	Number of representatives
Labour Party (Arbeiderpartiet)	13
Communist Party (Kommunistiske Parti)	8
Christian Democratic Party (Kristelig Folkeparti)	4
Joint list of the Liberal Party (Venstre) and the Radical People's Party (Radikale Folkepartiet)	4
Joint List(s) of Non-Socialist Parties (Borgerlige Felleslister)	3
Total number of members:	32

Eidanger herredsstyre 1937–1941*
Party name (in Norwegian)	Number of representatives
Labour Party (Arbeiderpartiet)	17
Conservative Party (Høyre)	5
Farmers' Party (Bondepartiet)	1
Liberal Party (Venstre)	9
Total number of members:	32
Note: Due to the German occupation of Norway during World War II, no elections were held for new municipal councils until after the war ended in 1945.

=== Mayors ===
The mayor (Norwegian: ordfører) of Eidanger Municipality was the political leader of the municipality and the chairperson of the municipal council. The following people have held this position:

- 1838–1839: Jacob Sørensen Hvalen
- 1840–1843: Carl Nicolay Bugge
- 1844–1845: Jacob Sørensen Hvalen
- 1846–1849: Amund Tveten
- 1850–1852: Jacob Sørensen Hvalen
- 1853–1857: Amund Tveten
- 1857–1859: Jacob Sørensen Hvalen
- 1860–1865: Anders Olsen Langangen
- 1865–1865: Nils V. Slevolden
- 1865–1871: Ole P. Grava
- 1871–1880: H.J. Hvalen
- 1880–1882: Jacob Olsen Grava
- 1882–1884: H.J. Hvalen
- 1884–1886: Jacob Olsen Grava
- 1886–1888: Peder Pedersen Røra
- 1888–1889: Aasold K. Ørvig (V)
- 1889–1895: Jacob S. Skrukkerød (H)
- 1895–1901: Andreas Ramberg (V)
- 1902–1904: K. Larsen-Røra
- 1905–1910: Andreas Ramberg (V)
- 1911–1916: Olav Versvik (V)
- 1916–1919: Finn C. Knudsen
- 1919–1922: Olav Versvik (V)
- 1922–1929: Ole Petter Grava (Bp)
- 1929–1931: Peder Roe (V)
- 1931–1935: Ole Petter Grava (Bp)
- 1935–1937: Simon Sørli
- 1937–1941: Gustav Hill (Ap)
- 1941–1944: Mikael Aamot (NS)
- 1945–1945: Per Versvik (NS)
- 1945–1953: Gustav Hill (Ap)
- 1953–1963: Lars Trevold (Ap)

== See also ==
- List of former municipalities of Norway
