= Løvøya, Telemark =

Island in Telemark, Norway

Løvøya
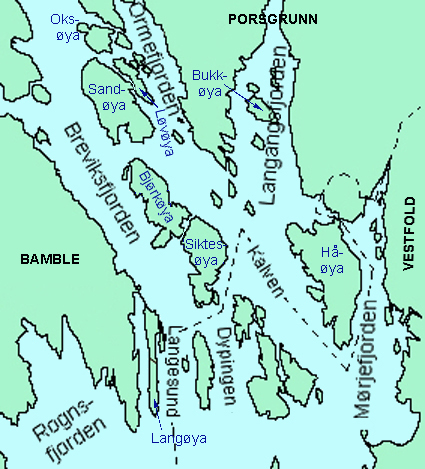
- Løvøya seen together with other islands outside Porsgrunn
- Interactive map of the island

Geography
- Location: Telemark, Norway
- Coordinates: 59.0609°N 9.74063°E
- Area: 0.25 km^{2} (0.097 sq mi)
- Length: 1.3 km (0.81 mi)
- Width: 240 m (790 ft)

Administration
- Norway
- County: Telemark
- Municipality: Porsgrunn Municipality

Løvøya is an island in Porsgrunn Municipality in Telemark county, Norway. The 0.25-square-kilometre (62-acre) island is located in the Ormerfjorden, just east of the island of Sandøya, and about 2 kilometres (1.2 mi) east of the town of Brevik.

== Geology ==
In 1828, Morten Thrane Esmark found a black mineral on the island. He sent it to Swedish chemist Jöns Jakob Berzelius for examination for further analysis. Berzelius determined that it contained a new element, which he named thorium after Thor, the Norse god of thunder.

== See also ==
- List of islands of Norway
