= Morten Thrane Esmark =

Norwegian priest and mineralogist (1801–1882)

Hans Morten Thrane Esmark (21 August 1801 – 24 April 1882) was a Norwegian priest and mineralogist. He is most noted for first locating the mineral thorite.

== Biography ==
Morten Thrane Esmark was born at Kongsberg in Buskerud, Norway as a son of Professor Jens Esmark, a professor of mineralogy. His given name came from his maternal grandfather Danish zoologist and mineralogist, Morten Thrane Brünnich. Esmark took his theological exam in 1825 and first began his ministry as chaplain at Eidanger Church in Bratsberg county. He then served as a parish priest for a period at Ramnes Church in Jarlsberg. He later served as vicar at Brevik in Telemark.

Morten Thrane Esmark described several new minerals principally from Langesundsfjorden in Telemark. He commonly sent interesting specimens to his father, Jens Esmark, who was a professor of mineralogy and geology at the Royal Frederick University. Morten Thrane Esmark located the first specimens of thorite, from which the element thorium is derived, on the island of Løvøya near Porsgrunn. His father forwarded the specimen to Swedish chemist Jöns Jacob Berzelius, who confirmed that it was a new mineral which contained a new element. The personal mineral collection of Morten Thrane Esmark was later donated to the Tromsø University Museum.

== Personal life ==
He was married to Ulriche Benedicte Wiborg (1810–1898). Nature researcher Birgitte Esmark (1841–1897) was their daughter.

== Related reading ==
- Larsen, Alf Olav (2010) The Langesundsfjord – History, Geology, Pegmatites, Minerals ( Bode Verlag GmbH) ISBN 978-3-925094-97-2
