= Brevik Church =

Church in Telemark, Norway

- Brevik kirke
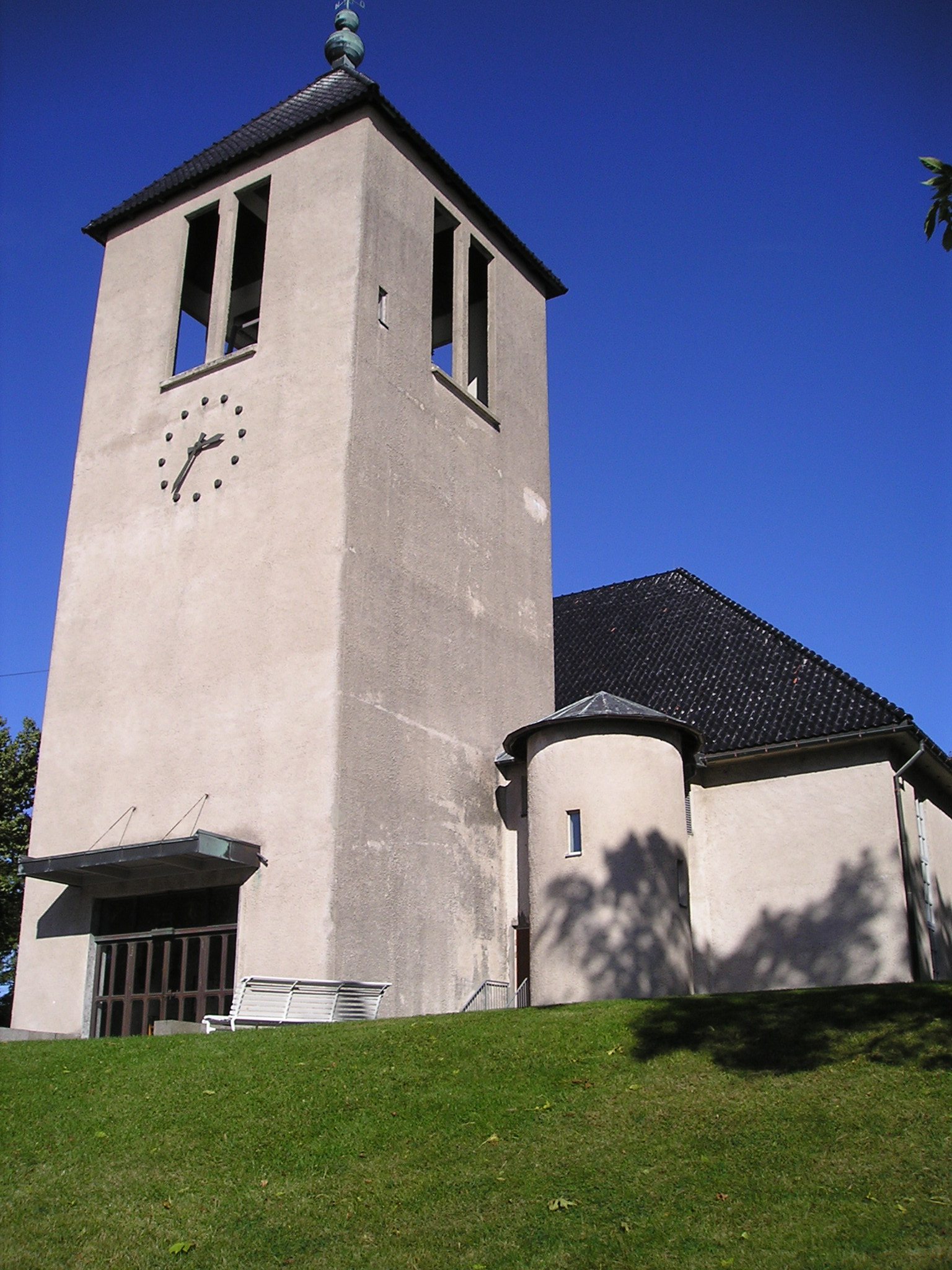
- View of the church
- Brevik Church
- 59°03′06″N 9°42′16″E
- Location: Porsgrunn Municipality, Telemark
- Country: Norway
- Denomination: Church of Norway
- Churchmanship: Evangelical Lutheran

History
- Status: Parish church
- Founded: 1673
- Consecrated: 12 December 1963

Architecture
- Functional status: Active
- Architect(s): G. Blakstad and H. Munthe-Kaas
- Architectural type: Rectangular
- Completed: 1963 (63 years ago)

Specifications
- Capacity: 450
- Materials: Concrete

Administration
- Diocese: Agder og Telemark
- Deanery: Skien prosti
- Parish: Eidanger
- Norwegian Cultural Heritage Site
- Type: Church
- Status: Not protected
- ID: 83955

Brevik Church (Norwegian: Brevik kirke) is a parish church of the Church of Norway in Porsgrunn Municipality in Telemark county, Norway. It is located in the village of Brevik. It is one of the churches for the Eidanger parish which is part of the Skien prosti (deanery) in the Diocese of Agder og Telemark. The grey, concrete church was built in a rectangular design in 1963 using plans drawn up by the architect Gudolf Blakstad. The church seats about 450 people.

== History ==
The village of Brevik was growing rapidly during the late 1600s. On 23 January 1670, six men, representing the villagers, petitioned the King to have their own church (also around this time, Brevik was established as a ladested). On 5 February, the county governor, Preben von Ahnen, endorsed their application. This was approved by the King and government on 30 May 1670. The church was built on the island of Sylterøya, near the current western cemetery gate, a short distance from the present site of the church. It was built near the highest point on the island. The church was a cruciform design and a log construction. It was called "Holy Trinity Church" (Norwegian: Hellig trefoldighets kirke). The church was likely completed and put into use in 1673. The church was built of logs, but had exterior paneling. It also had a basement underneath the nave. In 1690 and again in 1698, the bell tower was repaired. In 1749, the interior was also paneled to cover up the log construction. In 1754-1755, the church was repaired and a new sacristy was built on the east end of the chancel. The builder Joen Jacobsen from Skien was paid about 600 Norwegian rigsdaler for the work. In 1780-1781, the bell tower was rebuilt and increased in height. This rebuilding including the installation of a clock on three sides of the tower. By 1866, the church was deemed to be in very poor condition, so the request was made to the government to demolish it and build a new church. This request, however, was not granted until 3 July 1875.

The new church was designed by Johan Christoff Friedrich Reuter in a distinct neo-Gothic style. The new church was built about 100 metres (330 ft) to the southeast of the old church on a higher part of the island. This was done so that the old church could be used until the new one was ready. The new building was a wooden long church with about 800 seats. Some of the furnishings were moved over from the old church to the new church including the altar silver, baptismal font, clock, paintings, and chandeliers. The new church was consecrated by Bishop Jørgen Moe on 25 October 1878. The two churches stood side by side for a while before the old church was torn down and its materials were sold at auction. In 1953, the church was wired for electric light and heat.

On 16 February 1960, the church burned down. The church caught fire relatively quickly and the building could not be saved, however, a few of the items in the church were able to be saved. Soon after the fire damaged building was torn down, plans were made for a new church. Gudolf Blakstad and Herman Munthe-Kaas were hired to design the new church. The foundation stone was laid on 9 September 1962. The new building is constructed out of reinforced concrete which has certain features in common with traditional churches, but the building also contains a number of different rooms which are distributed over two floors. The 13.4-by-22.2-metre (44 ft × 73 ft) nave is on the main floor. On the west end of the nave is a church porch with an organ gallery and bell tower above it. The vestries and chancel are on the east end of the nave. The nave itself is wider than it is long, and it has 450 seats, of which 76 are in the organ gallery. The lower floor has other rooms, such as confirmation hall (seats 80), burial chapel (seats 110), coffin room, shelter, kitchen, bathrooms, and storage. The new church was consecrated on 15 December 1963.

== Media gallery ==
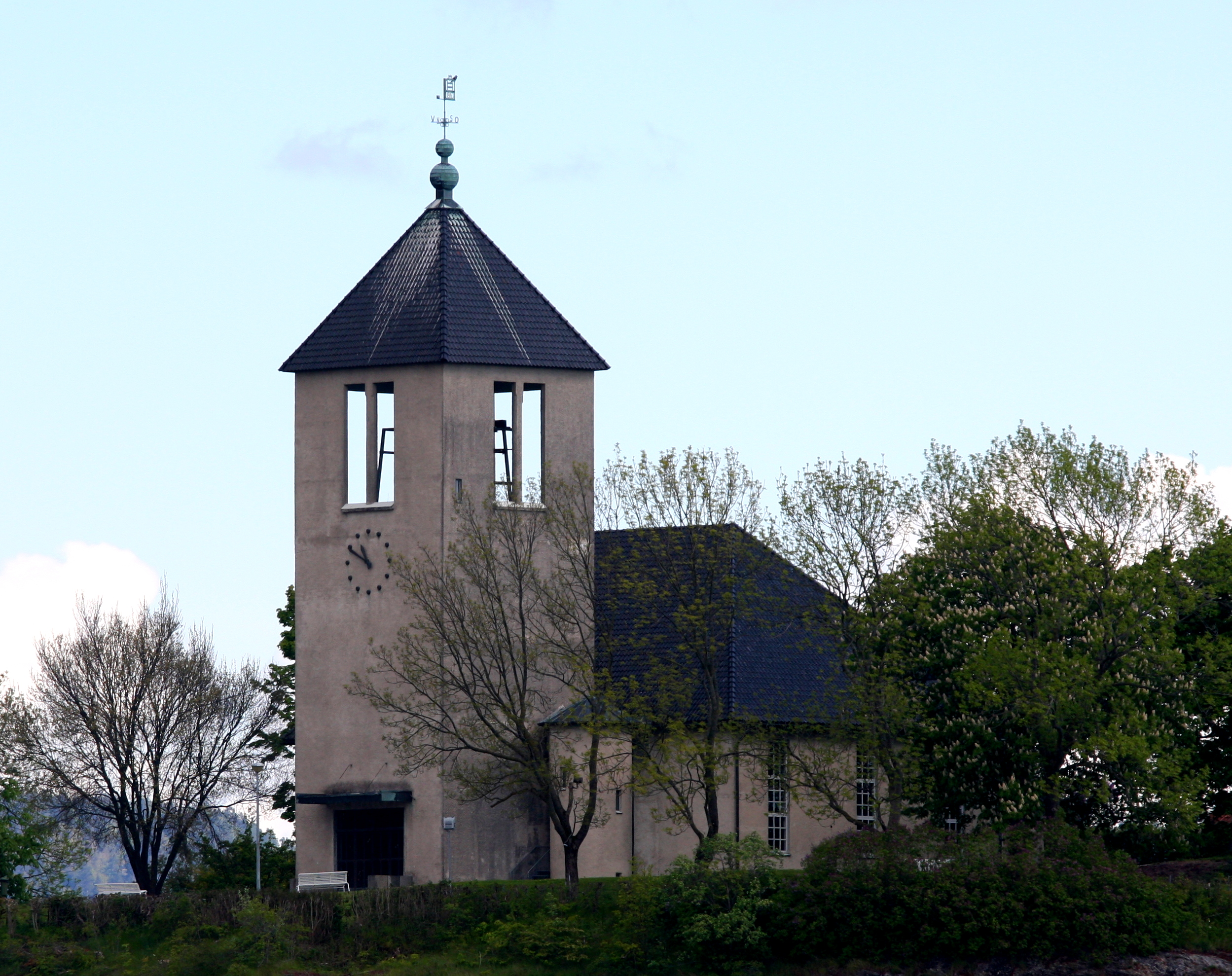
Church #3

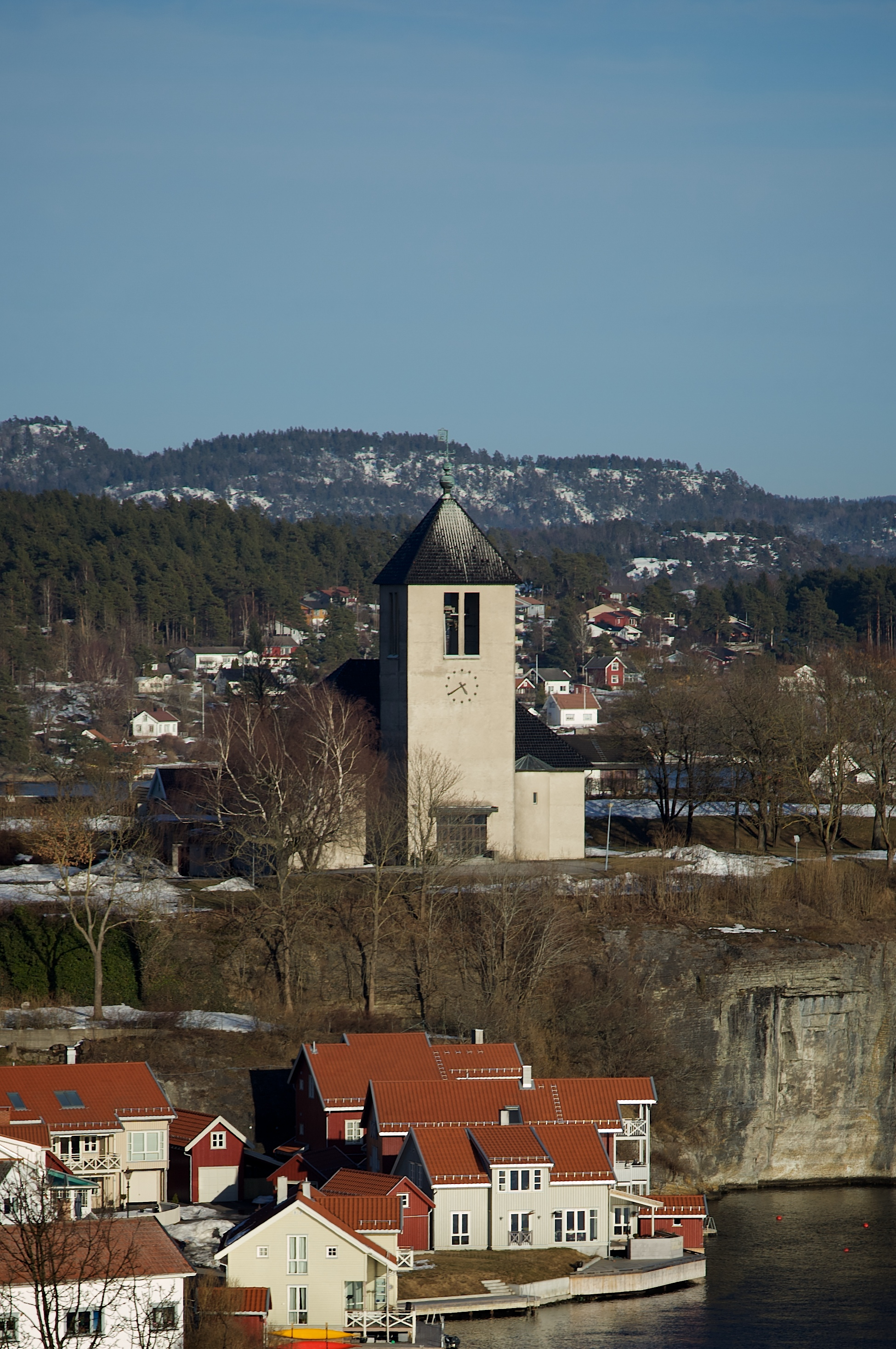
Church #3

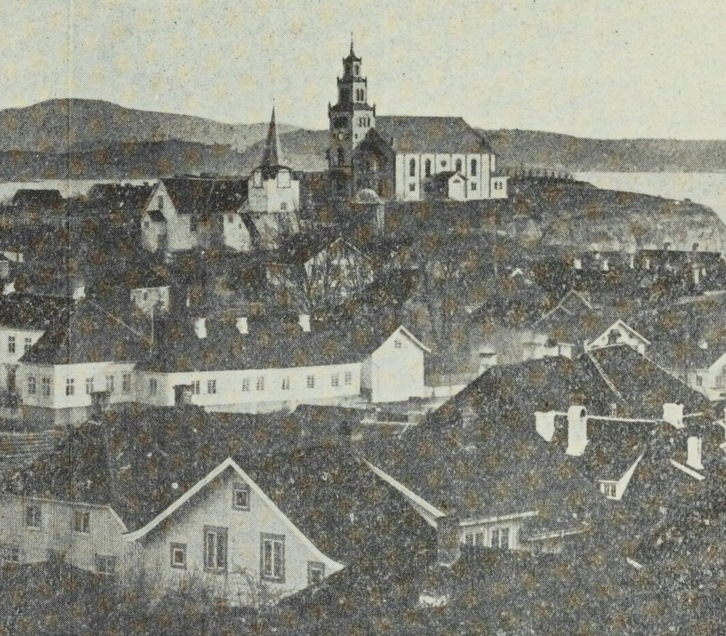
View of church #1 and the newly built church #2 (higher up on the island)

== See also ==
- List of churches in Agder og Telemark
