= Norcem Brevik =

Cement factory in Norway

- Type: Subsidiary
- Industry: Cement
- Founded: 1916
- Headquarters: Brevik, Porsgrunn, Norway
- Area served: Norway
- Parent: Norcem
- Website: www.norcem.no

Norcem Brevik is a cement factory located at Brevik in Porsgrunn, Norway. Established as Dalen Portland Cementfabrikk in 1916, production commenced in 1919. The plant merged with Christiania Portland Cementfabrik and Nordland Portland Cementfabrik in 1968 to establish Norcem, which is now part of HeidelbergCement. The facility has an annual output of 1.2 million tonnes.

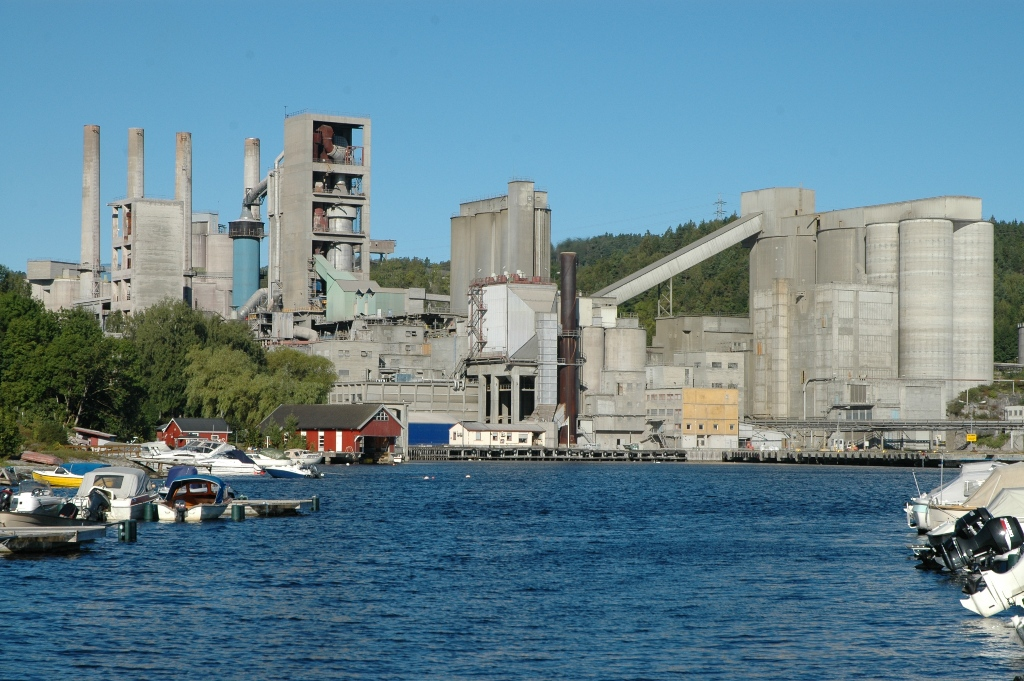
The plant in 2008

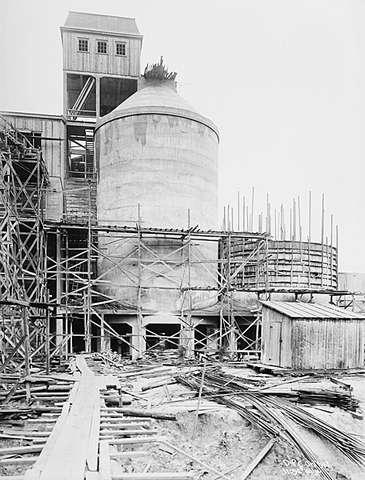
The plant in 1918
