= Johan Peder Basberg =

Norwegian politician

Johan Peder Basberg (1794–??) was a Norwegian politician.

In 1854 he was elected to the Norwegian Parliament, representing the constituency of Brevig. He worked as surveyor of customs and excise in that town. He served only one term.
