= Norcem =

Norwegian cement company

Norcem AS
- Type: Subsidiary
- Industry: Cement
- Founded: 1968
- Headquarters: Oslo, Norway
- Number of locations: Brevik and Kjøpsvik
- Area served: Norway
- Number of employees: 386 (2026)
- Parent: HeidelbergCement
- Website: www.norcem.no

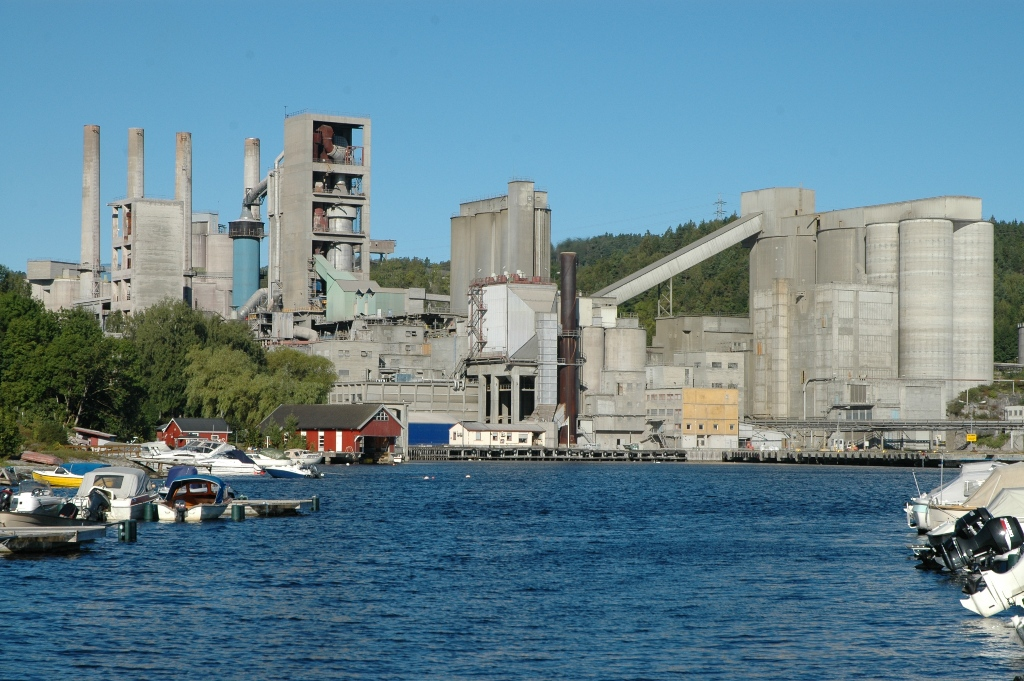
Norcem cement plant in Brevik

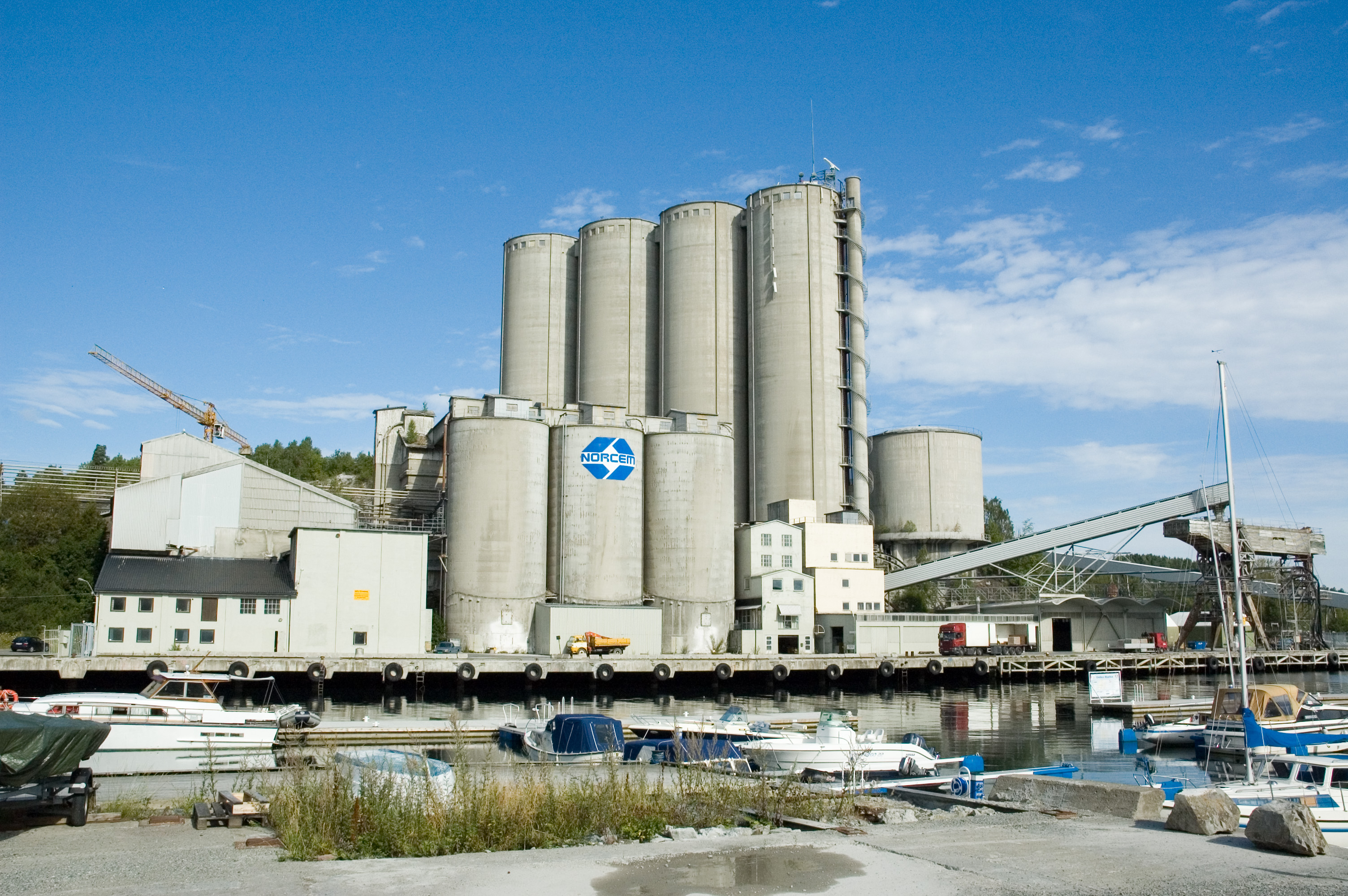
Norcem cement terminal in Slemmestad

Norcem AS is a Norwegian manufacturer of cement, and subsidiary of HeidelbergCement. It has plants in Brevik and Kjøpsvik.

== History ==
Norcem was established in 1968 as a merger between the three cement factories Christiania Portland Cementfabrikk (founded in 1888), Dalen Portland Cemetfabrikk (founded in 1916) and Nordland Portland Cementfabrikk (founded in 1918).

Norcem grew into a conglomerate of companies, especially in the building material sector, but also in the booming offshore sector. In 1987 Norcem merged with Aker mekaniske Verksted and created Aker Norcem, though it changed its name to Aker in 1988. The cement division of Aker merged with Euroc owned by Skanska of Sweden to form Scancem in 1995. In 1999 Scancem was sold to the German HeidelbergCement.

Today, Norcem operates two cement plants, and 35 cement terminals along the Norwegian coast. The plant in Kjøpsvik is the northernmost cement plant in the world.
