= Susanna Hesselberg =

Susanna Hesselberg, born 1967 in Uppsala of a Norwegian father and a Swedish mother, lives and works in Malmö, Sweden. Her mother is also related with the great Cassels family of Sweden.

Susanna Hesselberg is an established international artist who has shown her work widely for a number of years. Represented by galleries in Paris, Copenhagen and Malmö amongst other solo exhibitions she has had shows in at The School Gallery, Paris (2008), Peter Lav Gallery, Copenhagen (2007), Centre Culture Suédois, Paris (2005 and 2004). In 2009 her work will be shown at the Nikolaj Copenhagen Contemporary Art Centre and at Tensta Konsthall.
