= Brevik, Norway =

Town in Telemark county, Norway

Brevik Brevig (historic)
- Town/City
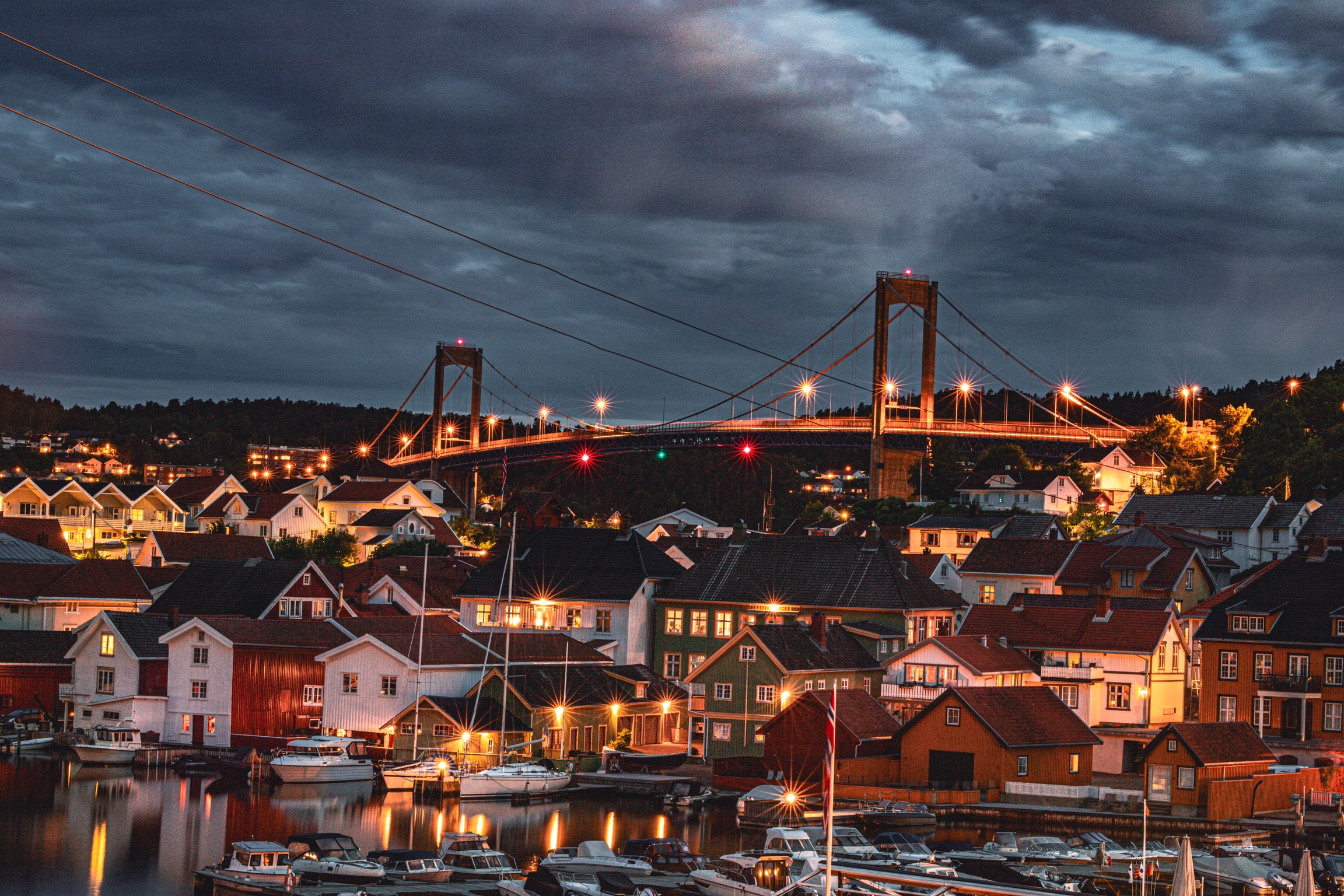
- View of the Brevik Marina at night Credit: Sandesh Aryal
- Interactive map of Brevik
- Coordinates: 59.05544°N 9.69593°E
- Country: Norway
- Region: Eastern Norway
- County: Telemark
- District: Grenland
- Municipality: Porsgrunn Municipality
- Established as
- Ladested: 1680–1845
- Kjøpstad: 1845–1963
- Town (By): 2009
- Elevation: 33 m (108 ft)
- Time zone: UTC+01:00 (CET)
  - Summer (DST): UTC+02:00 (CEST)
- Post Code: 3950 Brevik
- Former municipality
- Brevik ladested
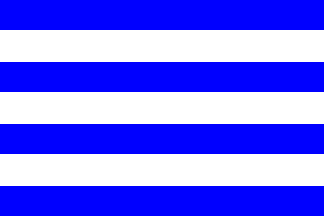
- Flag Coat of arms

- Telemark within Norway

- Brevik within Telemark
- Country: Norway
- County: Telemark
- District: Grenland
- Established: 1 Jan 1838
  - Created as: Formannskapsdistrikt
- Disestablished: 1 Jan 1964
  - Succeeded by: Porsgrunn Municipality
- Administrative centre: Brevik

Government
  - Mayor (1960–1963): M.E. Schilbred Midelfart

Area (upon dissolution)
  - Total: 0.9 km^{2} (0.35 sq mi)
  - Rank: #675 in Norway

Population (1963)
  - Total: 2,403
  - Rank: #378 in Norway
  - Density: 2,670/km^{2} (6,900/sq mi)
  - Change (10 years): ▲ +5.2%

Official language
  - Norwegian form: Neutral
- Time zone: UTC+01:00 (CET)
  - Summer (DST): UTC+02:00 (CEST)
- ISO 3166 code: NO-0804

Brevik (Norwegian pronunciation: [ˈbrêːviːk]) is a town in Porsgrunn Municipality in Telemark county, Norway. The town is located where the Eidangerfjorden and Frierfjorden join together to form the Breviksfjorden. Brevik is regarded as one of the best preserved towns from the sailing ship era. The town is located on the far end of the Eidangerhalvøya peninsula, and was a former export centre for ice and timber. The last shipment of wood to the United Kingdom was around 1960.

Brevik is located about 10 kilometres (6.2 mi) to the south of the town of Porsgrunn in a very large urban area. Brevik has an estimated population of 2,100 in the year 2020. It is considered part of the Porsgrunn/Skien metropolitan area by Statistics Norway, so Brevik's population is not tracked separately.

Brevik has significant industry, including cement production (Norcem, formerly Dalen Portland Cementfabrik, which is Norway's largest cement factory), workshop industry, food industry (among others Diplom-ice), and mining (Kjørholt limestone mine, which is Norway's largest mine). The town is located on the mainland and also on the small island of Sylterøya. There is a bridge over the strait between Sylterøya and the mainland. The town hall, which is an old farm estate, and Brevik Church are located on Sylterøya. Brevik has narrow and crooked streets with interesting, irregular buildings.

== Name ==
The town is named after the old Brevik farm (Old Norse: Breiðvík). The first element is breiðr which means "broad". The last element is vík which means "inlet" or "bay". Historically, the name was spelled Brevig, using the old Danish spelling.

== Government ==
In Norway, municipalities are the unit of local government. This means that cities and towns are simply designations for urban areas, but under current Norwegian law, they have no actual government authority. The town of Brevik lies within Porsgrunn Municipality and is therefore governed by the municipal council of Porsgrunn Municipality.

== History ==
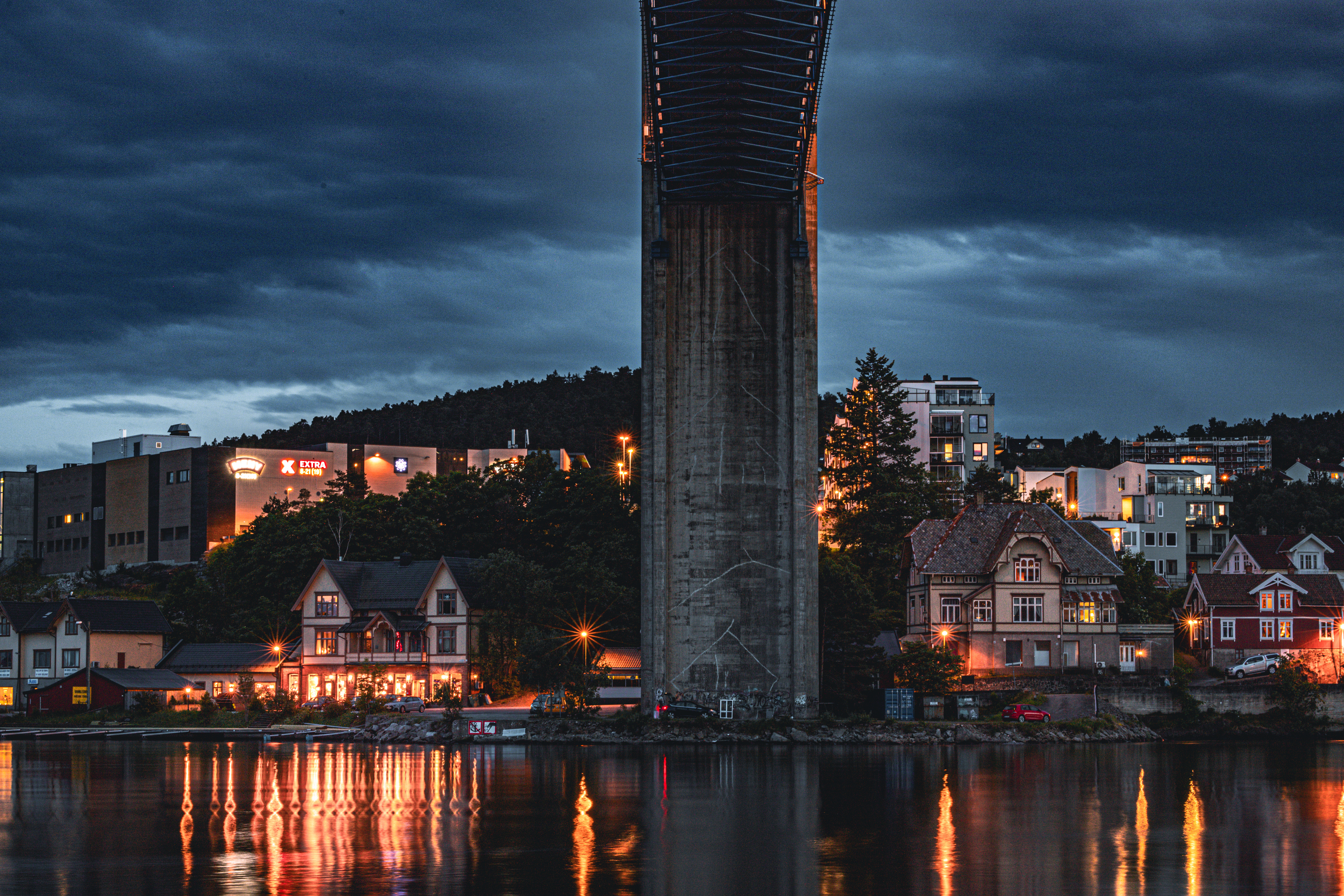
View under the Brevik Bridge towards Stathelle. Credit: Sandesh Aryal

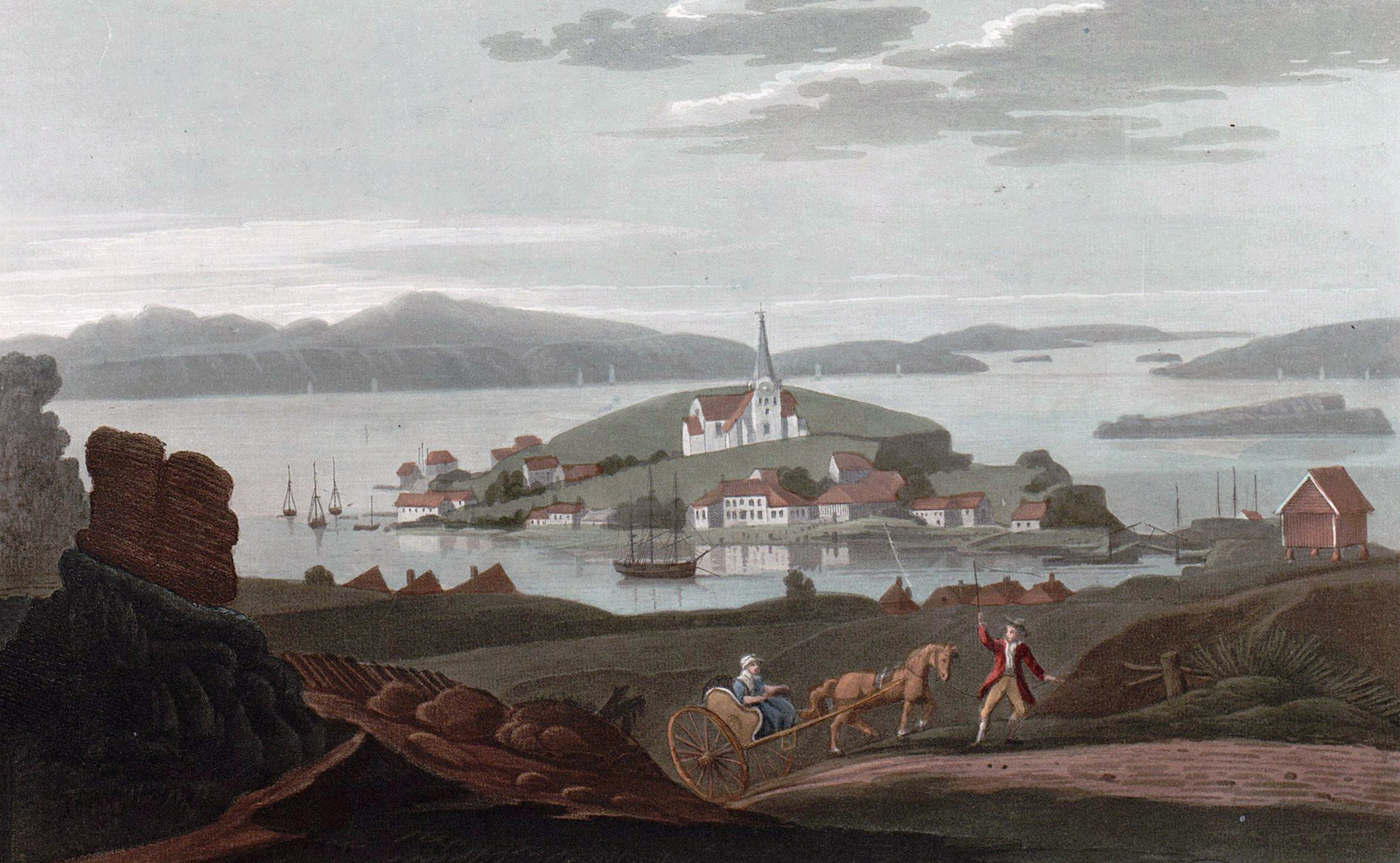
Painting of Brevik c. 1800

=== Important milestones ===
Some of the important milestones in the development of the growing town include the establishment of:

- a post office in 1689
- a new town hall was built in 1761 by Jørgen Christie
- a pharmacy in 1846
- the Brevikbanen railway line in 1895, part of the larger Vestfoldbanen railway line

=== Coat of arms ===
The coat of arms was granted on 14 May 1954 and it was in use until 1 January 1964 when the town became part of Porsgrunn Municipality. The official blazon is "Azure, three bars argent" (Norwegian: Tre sølv bjelker på blå bunn). This means the arms have a blue field (background) and the charge is a set of three horizontal bars spaced equally across the arms. The charge has a tincture of argent which means it is commonly colored white, but if it is made out of metal, then silver is used. The blue color in the field symbolizes the importance of the sea. The three bars were chosen to represent floating logs and the importance of the timber industry in the town. The arms were designed by Paulus Holm. The municipal flag has the same design as the coat of arms.

=== Administrative history ===
The growing village and harbour of Brevig (later spelled Brevik) was historically part of the old Eidanger prestegjeld. The village was established as a ladested ("seaport/lading place") in 1680 and it was then separated from the Eidanger prestegjeld due to its new status as a ladested. The formannskapsdistrikt law of 1837 created a system of local government in Norway by establishing each town or city (ladested or kjøpstad) and each Church of Norway prestegjeld as a civil municipality. On 1 January 1838, the ladested of Breivig was established as Brevig Municipality (later spelled Brevik). In 1845, the seaport was granted kjøpstad status ("town status").

During the 1960s, there were many municipal mergers across Norway due to the work of the Schei Committee. On 1 January 1964, Brevik Municipality was dissolved and the following areas were merged to form an enlarged Porsgrunn Municipality:

- all of Brevik Municipality (population: 2,498)
- all of Porsgrunn Municipality (population: 10,863)
- all of Eidanger Municipality (population: 13,018)
- the Bakke area (population: 75) of Hedrum Municipality in Vestfold county
- the Enigheten, Høyberg, and Skavåsen areas (population: 12) of Brunlanes Municipality in Vestfold county

=== Municipal self-government (1838-1964) ===
Brevik existed as a self-governing municipality from 1838 until 1964. While it existed, Brevik Municipality was responsible for primary education (through 10th grade), outpatient health services, senior citizen services, welfare and other social services, zoning, economic development, and municipal roads and utilities. The municipality was governed by a municipal council of directly elected representatives. The mayor was indirectly elected by a vote of the municipal council. The municipality was under the jurisdiction of the Bamble District Court and the Agder Court of Appeal.

==== Mayors ====
The mayor (Norwegian: ordfører) of Brevik Municipality was the political leader of the municipality and the chairperson of the municipal council. The following people have held this position:

- 1838–1839: Hans Morten Thrane Esmark
- 1840–1840: Simon Karenius Høegh
- 1841–1841: Hans Morten Thrane Esmark
- 1842–1844: Jacob Conrad Christoffer Parnemann
- 1845–1845: Hans Morten Thrane Esmark
- 1846–1846: Thomas Johannes Wiborg
- 1846–1847: Johan Peder Basberg
- 1848–1848: Anders Christian Evensen
- 1849–1849: Jacob Conrad Christoffer Parnemann
- 1850–1852: Henrik Carsten Albretsen
- 1853–1856: Anders Christian Evensen
- 1857–1857: Mads Olsen Helland
- 1858–1858: Thomas Johannes Wiborg
- 1859–1859: Immanuel Møller
- 1860–1860: Thomas Severin Heiberg Hoffmann
- 1861–1861: Henrik Carsten Albretsen
- 1862–1862: Nicolai Wilhelm Coch
- 1863–1863: Johan Christian Tandberg Castberg
- 1864–1864: Peter Carl William Blichfeldt
- 1864–1864: Axel Thrane Esmark
- 1865–1865: Anders Christian Evensen
- 1866–1866: Axel Thrane Esmark
- 1867–1869: Peter Carl William Blichfeldt
- 1870–1870: Mads Olsen Helland
- 1871–1871: Anders Christian Evensen
- 1872–1872: Mads Olsen Helland
- 1873–1873: Axel Thrane Esmark
- 1874–1875: Tollef Sohlberg
- 1876–1876: Nicolai Wilhelm Coch
- 1877–1877: Tollef Sohlberg
- 1878–1879: S.C. Larsen
- 1880–1881: Emil Constans Eugene Münster
- 1882–1882: Tollef Sohlberg
- 1883–1887: S.C. Larsen
- 1888–1888: Tollef Sohlberg
- 1889–1889: S.C. Larsen
- 1890–1890: Mathias Edward Schilbred
- 1890–1890: H.M. Albretsen
- 1891–1892: S.C. Larsen
- 1893–1895: Tollef Sohlberg
- 1896–1898: Oluf M. Coch
- 1899–1900: H.M. Albretsen
- 1901–1901: Jørgen Theodor Eriksen
- 1902–1904: Tollef Sohlberg
- 1905–1907: Jørgen Theodor Eriksen
- 1908–1909: H.M. Albretsen
- 1910–1910: Ingebret Jensen
- 1911–1913: Tønnes Birkeland
- 1914–1915: Marthinius Eriksen
- 1916–1917: Otto Ruberg
- 1918–1919: Hans Jakob Johnsen
- 1920–1920: Ola Jacobsen
- 1921–1922: Hans Hansen
- 1923–1925: Thor Ketilsson
- 1926–1926: Marthinius Eriksen
- 1927–1927: Thor Ketilsson
- 1928–1928: Marthinius Eriksen
- 1929–1931: Eilert Rinde
- 1932–1932: Olav Skjellaug
- 1933–1933: Eilert Rinde
- 1934–1934: Olav Skjellaug
- 1935–1935: Ludvig Holst Hansen
- 1936–1936: Johan Lundsholt
- 1937–1937: Ludvig Holst Hansen
- 1938–1938: Olav Skjellaug
- 1939–1940: Johan Lundsholt
- 1941–1941: Peder Holtan
- 1942–1942: Ottar Huuse
- 1943–1945: August Zachariassen
- 1945–1945: Odd Humblen
- 1945–1946: Johan Lundsholt
- 1946–1947: Thor Ketilsson
- 1948–1948: Mathias Edward Schilbred Midelfart
- 1949–1949: Hans E. Hansen
- 1950–1950: Mathias Edward Schilbred Midelfart
- 1951–1951: Hans E. Hansen
- 1952–1959: Knut Gjønnes
- 1960–1963: Mathias Edward Schilbred Midelfart

==== Municipal council ====
The municipal council (Bystyre) of Brevik was made up of representatives that were elected to four year terms. The tables below show the historical composition of the council by political party.

Brevik bystyre 1959–1963
| Party name (in Norwegian) | Number of representatives |
|---|---|
| Labour Party (Arbeiderpartiet) | 10 |
| Joint List(s) of Non-Socialist Parties (Borgerlige Felleslister) | 11 |
| Total number of members: | 21 |
Note: On 1 January 1964, Brevik Municipality became part of Porsgrunn Municipality.

Brevik bystyre 1955–1959
| Party name (in Norwegian) | Number of representatives |
|---|---|
| Labour Party (Arbeiderpartiet) | 8 |
| Conservative Party (Høyre) | 4 |
| Communist Party (Kommunistiske Parti) | 4 |
| Christian Democratic Party (Kristelig Folkeparti) | 1 |
| Liberal Party (Venstre) | 4 |
| Total number of members: | 21 |

Brevik bystyre 1951–1955
| Party name (in Norwegian) | Number of representatives |
|---|---|
| Labour Party (Arbeiderpartiet) | 9 |
| Conservative Party (Høyre) | 4 |
| Communist Party (Kommunistiske Parti) | 3 |
| Liberal Party (Venstre) | 4 |
| Total number of members: | 20 |

Brevik bystyre 1947–1951
| Party name (in Norwegian) | Number of representatives |
|---|---|
| Labour Party (Arbeiderpartiet) | 6 |
| Conservative Party (Høyre) | 5 |
| Communist Party (Kommunistiske Parti) | 4 |
| Christian Democratic Party (Kristelig Folkeparti) | 1 |
| Joint list of the Liberal Party (Venstre) and the Radical People's Party (Radikale Folkepartiet) | 4 |
| Total number of members: | 20 |

Brevik bystyre 1945–1947
| Party name (in Norwegian) | Number of representatives |
|---|---|
| Labour Party (Arbeiderpartiet) | 5 |
| Conservative Party (Høyre) | 3 |
| Communist Party (Kommunistiske Parti) | 7 |
| Christian Democratic Party (Kristelig Folkeparti) | 3 |
| Joint list of the Liberal Party (Venstre) and the Radical People's Party (Radikale Folkepartiet) | 2 |
| Total number of members: | 20 |

Brevik bystyre 1937–1941*
| Party name (in Norwegian) | Number of representatives |
|---|---|
| Labour Party (Arbeiderpartiet) | 7 |
| Liberal Party (Venstre) | 5 |
| Joint list of the Conservative Party (Høyre) and the Free-minded People's Party (Frisinnede Folkeparti) | 5 |
| Local List(s) (Lokale lister) | 3 |
| Total number of members: | 20 |
Note: Due to the German occupation of Norway during World War II, no elections were held for new municipal councils until after the war ended in 1945.

Brevik bystyre 1935–1937
| Party name (in Norwegian) | Number of representatives |
|---|---|
| Labour Party (Arbeiderpartiet) | 7 |
| Conservative Party (Høyre) | 5 |
| Communist Party (Kommunistiske Parti) | 1 |
| Liberal Party (Venstre) | 4 |
| Local List(s) (Lokale lister) | 3 |
| Total number of members: | 20 |

== Notable people ==
- Erik Hesselberg, a crewmember of the Kon-Tiki expedition
- Cort Adeler, a Norwegian seaman who was born in Brevik

== See also ==
- List of towns and cities in Norway
