= Eidanger =

Village in Porsgrunn Municipality, Norway

- Village
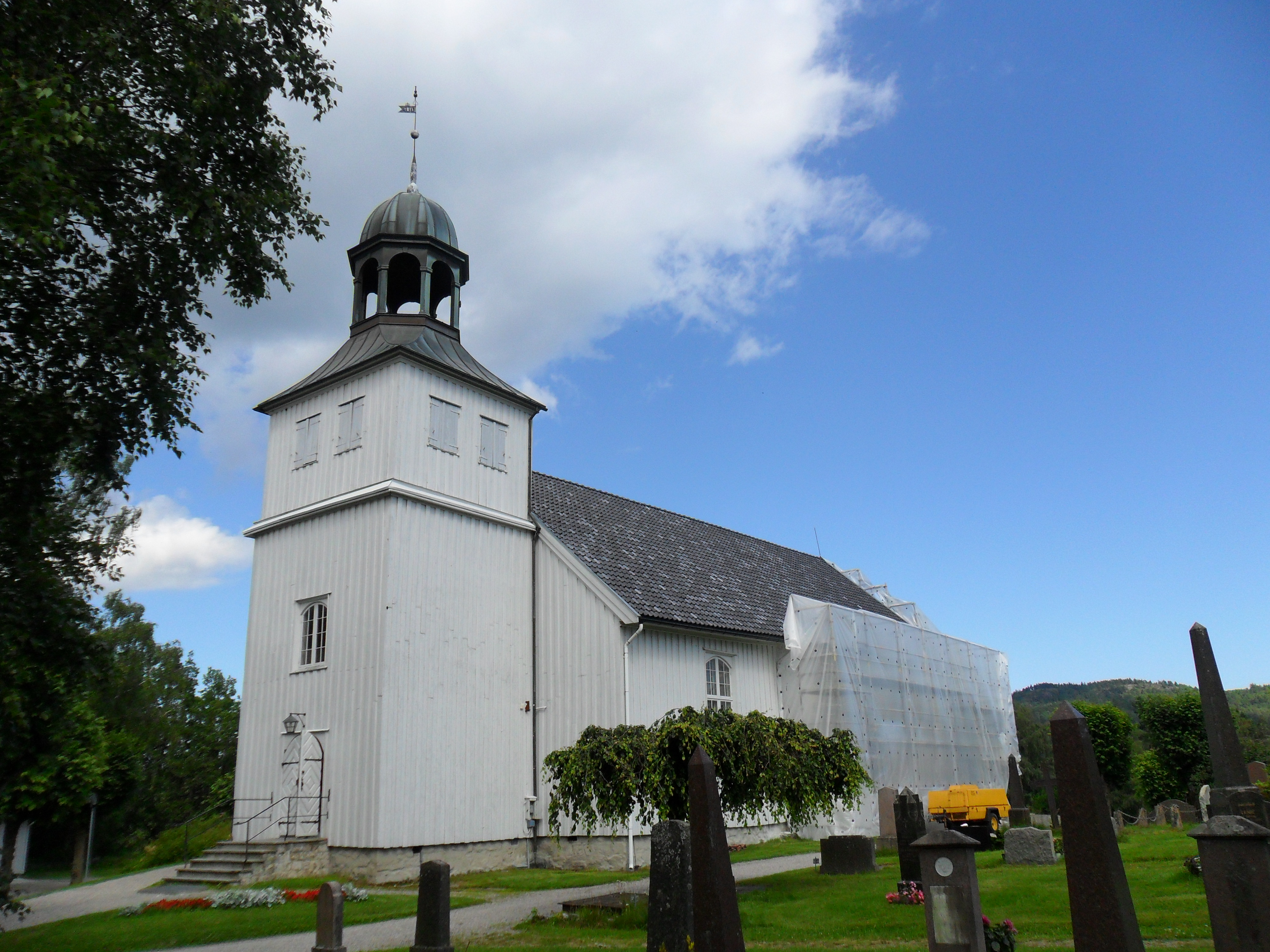
- View of the village church
- Interactive map of Eidanger
- Coordinates: 59.1185°N 9.698°E
- Country: Norway
- Region: Eastern Norway
- County: Telemark
- District: Grenland
- Municipality: Porsgrunn Municipality
- Elevation: 71 m (233 ft)
- Time zone: UTC+01:00 (CET)
  - Summer (DST): UTC+02:00 (CEST)
- Post Code: 3949 Porsgrunn

Eidanger is a village in Porsgrunn Municipality in Telemark county, Norway. The village is a suburb on the southeastern edge of the town of Porsgrunn. The European route E18 runs through the village which sits at the innermost part of the Eidangerfjorden. The Eidanger Church lies on the east side of the village.

== History ==
The village was the administrative centre of the old Eidanger Municipality which existed from 1838 until its dissolution in 1964.
