= Eidanger Church =

Church in Telemark, Norway

- Eidanger kirke
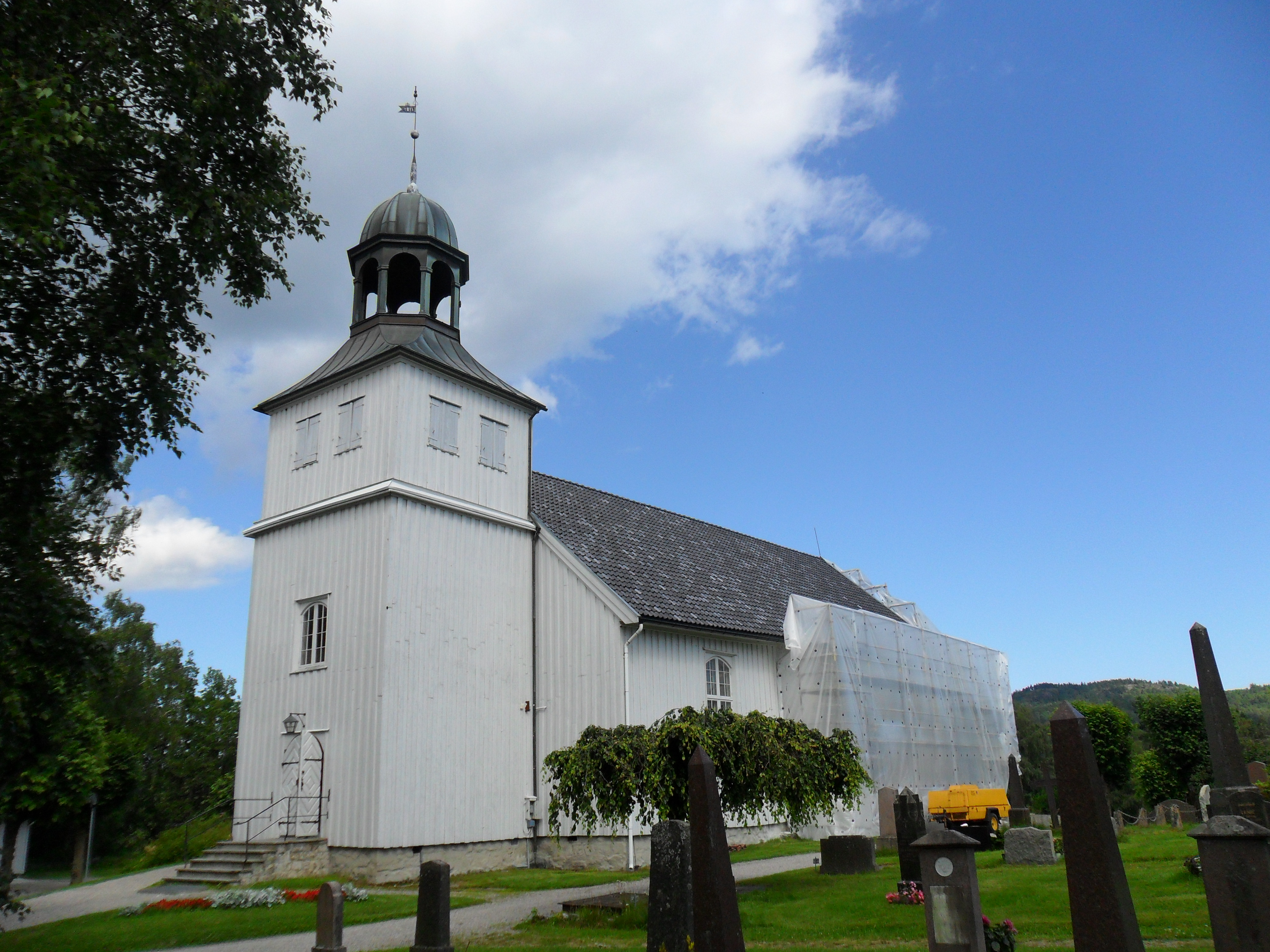
- View of the church
- Eidanger Church
- 59°07′07″N 9°41′57″E
- Location: Porsgrunn Municipality, Telemark
- Country: Norway
- Denomination: Church of Norway
- Previous denomination: Catholic Church
- Churchmanship: Evangelical Lutheran

History
- Status: Parish church
- Founded: c. 1150
- Consecrated: c. 1150

Architecture
- Functional status: Active
- Architectural type: Long church
- Completed: c.1150 (876 years ago)

Specifications
- Capacity: 200
- Materials: Stone

Administration
- Diocese: Agder og Telemark
- Deanery: Skien prosti
- Parish: Eidanger
- Norwegian Cultural Heritage Site
- Type: Church
- Status: Automatically protected
- ID: 84065

Eidanger Church (Norwegian: Eidanger kirke) is a parish church of the Church of Norway in Porsgrunn Municipality in Telemark county, Norway. It is located in the village of Eidanger. It is one of the churches for the Eidanger parish which is part of the Skien prosti (deanery) in the Diocese of Agder og Telemark. The white, stone church was built in a long church design around the year 1150 using plans drawn up by an unknown architect. The church seats about 200 people.

== History ==
The earliest existing historical records of the church date back to the year 1398, but the church was not built that year. The Romanesque stone church was built around the year 1150. At the time of its construction, it included a 13.5-by-8.3-metre (44 ft × 27 ft) nave and on the east side of the nave was a smaller chancel that was narrower and had a lower roofline. The walls of the building were about 1.5 metres (4 ft 11 in) thick. In 1787, the church was enlarged. The west wall was torn down and the nave was extended westwards with the construction of a timber-framed addition. At the same time, the church got a new bell tower and church porch on the west end of the newly enlarged nave. Also during this project, the chancel's apse was removed, giving the room a rectangular shape. After this addition, the chancel area was moved into the same room as the nave and the old chancel was closed off and turned into a sacristy.

In 1814, this church served as an election church (Norwegian: valgkirke). Together with more than 300 other parish churches across Norway, it was a polling station for elections to the 1814 Norwegian Constituent Assembly which wrote the Constitution of Norway. This was Norway's first national elections. Each church parish was a constituency that elected people called "electors" who later met together in each county to elect the representatives for the assembly that was to meet at Eidsvoll Manor later that year.

In 1852, most of the exterior of the church was clad in wooden siding to give the part-stone and part-wood building a more uniform appearance. In 1920–1921, the church was renovated to bring back some of the historic look of the old building using plans by Domenico Erdmann. The sacristy (the old medieval chancel) was re-opened and set up once again as a choir. The old stone altar was no longer, so a wooden altar was installed. In the 1970s, the wooden siding on the exterior stone walls was removed, and the bell tower was restored to its original appearance from 1787. In 1981, a new sacristy was built off the north side of the choir. In 1991, Terje Grøstad made a new altarpiece and pulpit as well as stained glass windows, a crucifix, and a processional cross for the church. An attempt was made to set the church on fire in 1996, but the fire extinguished itself.

== Media gallery ==
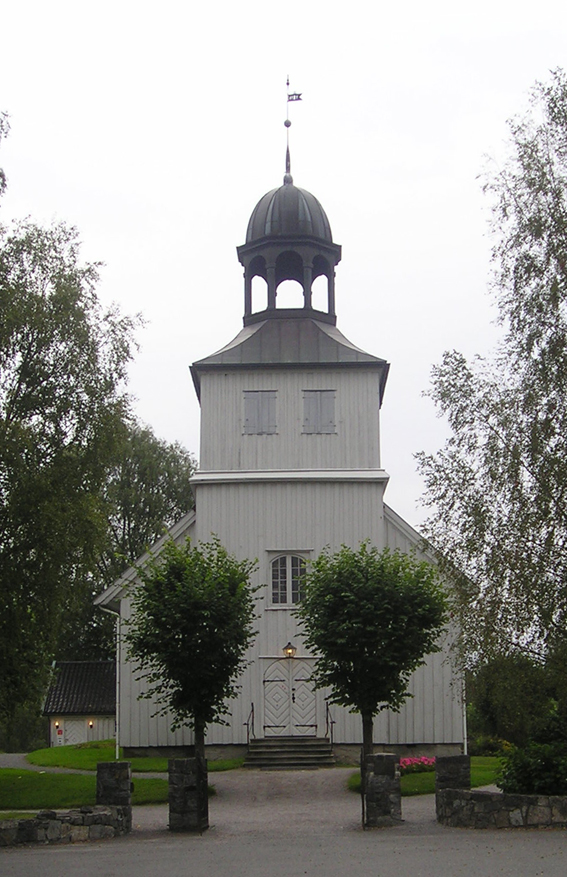

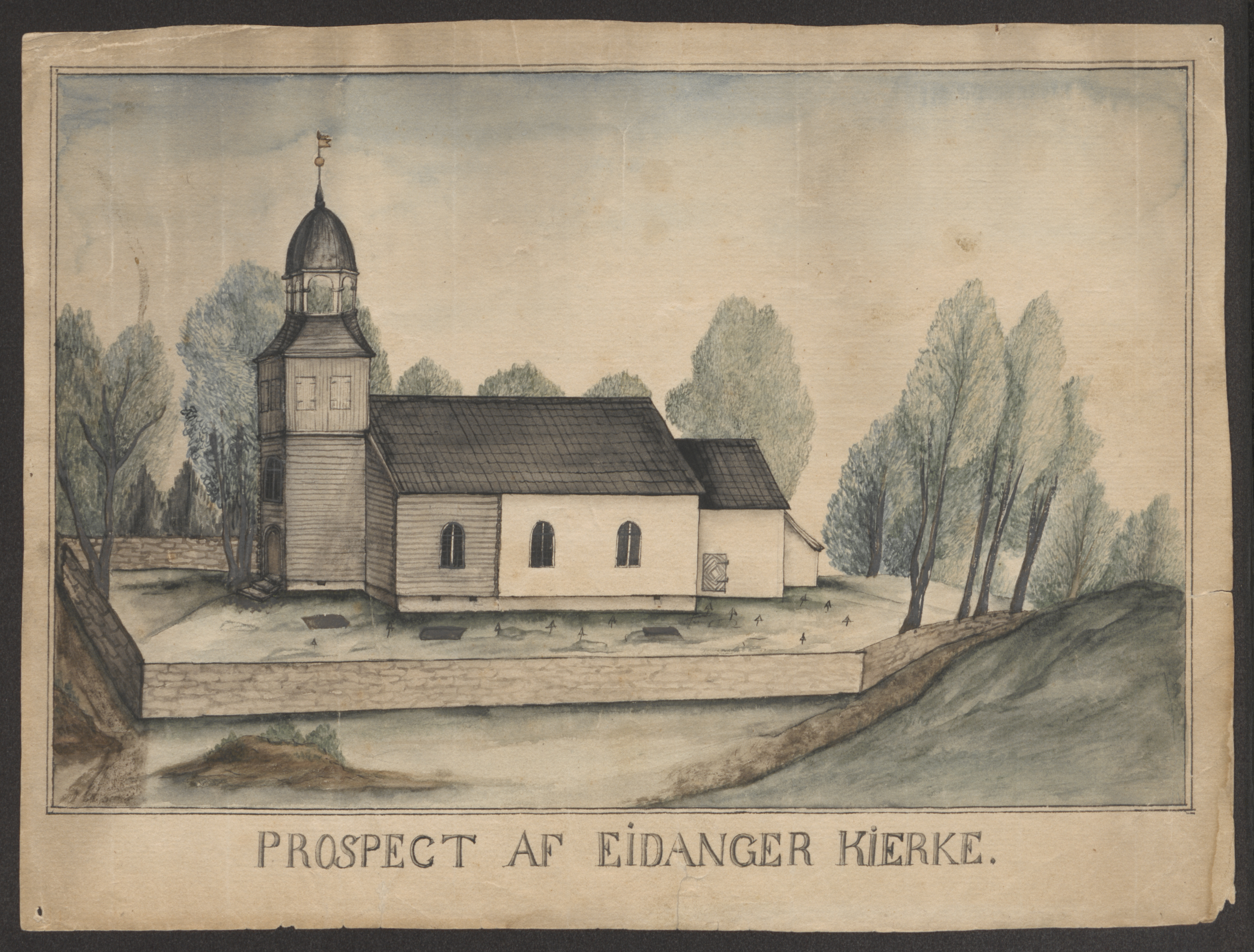

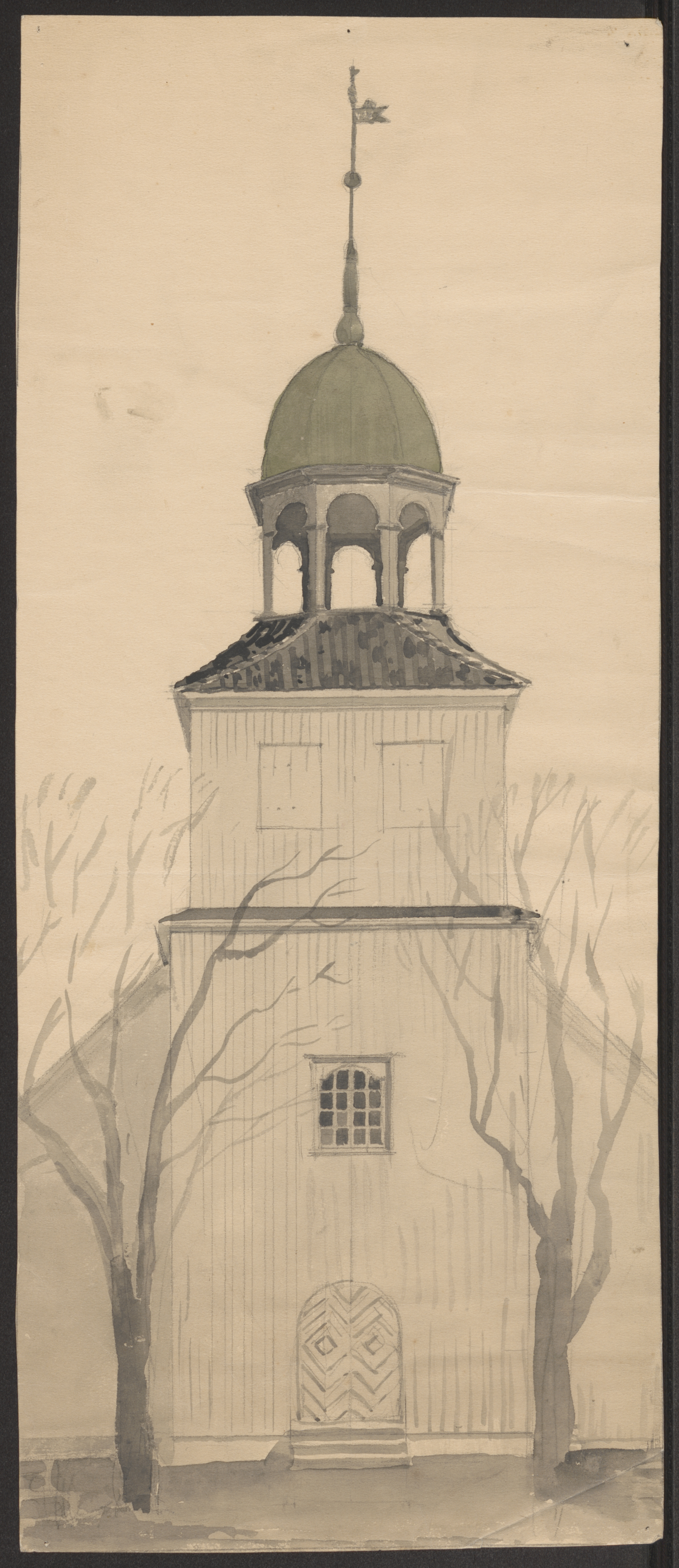

== See also ==
- List of churches in Agder og Telemark
